= List of polychaete worms of South Africa =

List of recorded species of the polychaete fauna of South Africa

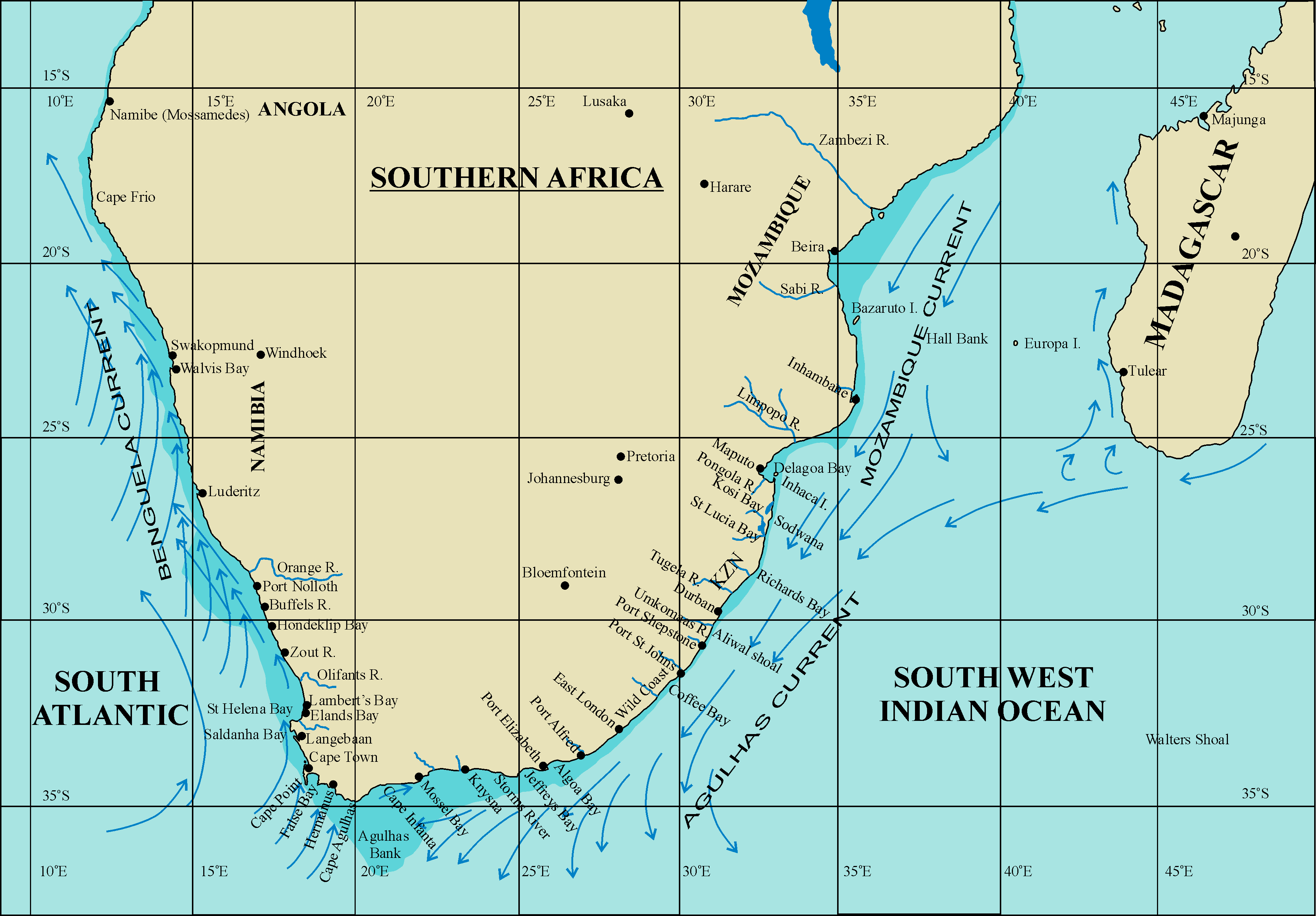
Map of the Southern African coastline showing some of the landmarks referred to in species range statements

The list of polychaete worms of South Africa is a list of species that form a part of the class Polychaeta (Phylum Annelida) fauna of South Africa. The list follows the SANBI listing.

Polychaeta (/ˌpɒlɪˈkiːtə/) is a paraphyletic class of generally marine annelid worms, commonly called bristle worms or polychaetes (/ˈpɒlɪˌkiːts/). Each body segment has a pair of fleshy protrusions called parapodia which bear many chitinous bristles called chaetae, hence their name.

More than 10,000 species have been described in this diverse and widespread class; in addition to inhabiting all of the world's oceans, polychaetes occur at all ocean depths, from planktonic species living near the surface, to a small undescribed species observed through ROV at the deepest region in the Earth's oceans, Challenger Deep. In addition, many species live on the abyssal plains, coral reefs, parasitically, and a few within fresh water.

Commonly encountered representatives include the lugworms, bloodworms, and species of Alitta such as the clam worm and sandworm or ragworm; these species inhabit shallow water marine environments and coastlines of subtropical and temperate regions around the world and may be used as fishing bait. More exotic species include the stinging fireworms, the predatory and large-bodied bobbit worm, the culturally important palolo worm, the bone-eating worms, and giant tube worms, which are extremophiles that tolerate near-boiling water near hydrothermal vents. (Full article...)

== Amphinomida ==
Order Amphinomida

=== Amphinomidae ===
Family Amphinomidae

- Genus Amphinome:
  - Amphinome rostrata (Kinberg, 1867), syn. Amphinome (Plerone) tetraedra, Amphinome lepadis, Amphinome luzoniae, Amphinome natans, Amphinome pallasii, Amphinome quatrefagesi, Amphinome tetraedra, Aphrodita rostrata, Asloegia capillata, Colonianella rostrata, Pleione tetraedra
- Genus Chloeia:
  - Chloeia inermis Quatrefages, 1866, syn. Chloeia gilchristi, Chloeia spectabilis
  - Chloeia flava (Pallas, 1766), syn. Amphinome capillata, Aphrodita flava, Chloeia ancora, Chloeia capillata, Chloeia ceylonica, Chloeia incerta, Chloeia natalensis, Thesmia flava
  - Chloeia fusca McIntosh, 1885, syn. Chloeia longisetosa
- Genus Eurythoe:
  - Eurythoe complanata (Pallas, 1766), syn. Amphinome jamaicensis, Amphinome macrotricha, Aphrodita complanata, Blenda armata, Eurythoe albosetosa, Eurythoe alcyonaria, Eurythoe assimilis, Eurythoe capensis, Eurythoe corallina, Eurythoe ehlersi, Eurythoe havaica, Eurythoe indica, Eurythoe kamehameha, Eurythoe laevisetis, Eurythoe pacifica, Eurythoe pacifica levukaensi, Lycaretus neocephalicus, Pleione alcyonea
  - Eurythoe parvecarunculata Horst, 1912, syn. Eurythoe heterotricha
- Genus Hipponoa:
  - Hipponoa gaudichaudi Audouin & Milne Edwards, 1833, syn. Hipponoa gaudichaudi agulhana
- Genus Linopherus:
  - Linopherus microcephala Fauvel 1932, syn. Pseudeurythoe microcephala
- Genus Pareurythoe:
  - Pareurythoe chilensis (Kinberg, 1867), syn. Eurythoe chilensis

=== Euphrosinidae ===
Family Euphrosinidae

- Genus Euphrosine:
  - Euphrosine capensis Kinberg, 1857, syn. Euphrosine polybranchia, Euphrosyne capensis
  - Euphrosine myrtosa Savigny in Lamarck, 1818, syn. Euphrosyne myrtosa

== Echiuroidea ==
Order Echiuroidea

=== Echiuridae ===
Family Echiuridae

- Genus Anelassorhynchus:
  - Anelassorhynchus gangae Biseswar, R., 1984
  - Anelassorhynchus indivisu Sluiter, 1900 syn. Thalassema indivisus
  - Anelassorhynchus moebii Greeff, 1879 syn. Thalassema moebii
- Genus Echiurus:
  - Echiurus antarcticus Spengel, 1912
  - Echiurus echiurus Pallas, 1766 syn. Lumbricus echiurus
- Genus Listriolobus:
  - Listriolobus capensis Jones & Stephen, 1966
- Genus Ochetostoma:
  - Ochetostoma arkati Prashad, 1935
  - Ochetostoma baronii Greeff, 1879 syn. Ochetostoma baroni
  - Ochetostoma cxaudex Lampert, 1883
  - Ochetostoma decameron Lanchester, 1905
  - Ochetostoma erythrogrammon Leuckart & Ruppell, 1828
  - Ochetostoma formosulum Lampert, 1883
  - Ochetostoma kempi Prashad, 1919
  - Ochetostoma natalense Biseswar, R., 1988
  - Ochetostoma palense Ikeda, 1924
- Genus Thalassema:
  - Thalassema diaphanes Sluiter, 1888
  - Thalassema elapsum Sluiter, 1912
  - Thalassema jenniferae Biseswar, R., 1988
  - Thalassema thalassemum Pallas, 1766 syn. Lumbricus thalassemum; Thalassema neptuni
  - Thalassema philostracum Fisher, 1947

== Eunicida ==
Order Eunicida

=== Dorvilleidae ===
Family Dorvilleidae

- Genus Ophryotrocha:
  - Ophryotrocha puerilis Claparède & Metschnikow, 1869, syn. Paractius mutabilis, Staurocephalus minimus
  - Protodorvillea biarticulata Day, 1963, endemic
  - Protodorvillea egena (Ehlers, 1913), syn. Dorvillea gracilloides, Dorvillea mandapamae, Protodorvillea mandapamae, Stauronereis egena
  - Schistomeringos neglecta (Fauvel, 1923), syn. Dorvillea neglecta, Staurocephalus neglectus, Stauronereis neglectus
  - Schistomeringos rudolphi (Delle Chiaje, 1828), syn. Dorvillea rudolphi, Nereis rudolphi, Nereis rudolphii, Prionognathus ciliata, Schistomeringos rudolphi, Schaurocephalus chiaji, Staurocephalus ciliatus robertianae, Staurocephalus pallidus, Staurocephalus rudolphii, Stauronereis madeirae, Stauronereis polyodonta, Stauronereis rudolphi, Stauronereis rudolphii, Syllis rudolphiana

=== Eunicidae ===
Family Eunicidae

- Genus Eunice:
  - Eunice laticeps Ehlers 1868, syn. Eunice tentaculata
  - Eunice cincta (Kinberg, 1865), syn Nicidion cincta
  - Eunice antennata (Savigny in Lamarck, 1818), syn. Eunice longiqua, Leodice antennata
  - Eunice australis Quatrefages, 1866, syn. Eunice leuconuchalis, Eunice paucibranchis
  - Eunice vittata (Delle Chiaje, 1828), syn. Eunice congesta, Eunice minuta, Eunice pellucida, Nereis vittata
  - Eunice indica Kinberg, 1865
  - Eunice tubifex Crossland, 1904, syn. Euniphysa tubifex
  - Eunice norvegica (Linnaeus, 1767), syn. Eunice gunneri, Leodice gunneri, Nereis madreporae pertusae, Nereis norvegica
  - Eunice pennata (O.F. Müller, 1776), syn. Eunice (Eunice) pennate, Nereis pennata
  - Eunice aphroditois (Pallas, 1788), syn. Eunice flavopicta, Leodice gigantea, Nereis aphroditois
  - Eunice grubei Gravier, 1900
  - Eunice filamentosa Grube & Örsted in Grube, 1856, syn. Eunice cirrobranchiata
  - Eunice afra Peters, 1855
- Genus Lysidice:
  - Lysidice natalensis Kinberg, 1865, syn. Lycidice natalensis, Lysidice atra, Lysidice capensis
  - Lysidice collaris Grube, 1870, syn. Lycidice lunae, Lycidice pectinifera, Lysidice fallax, Lysidice fusca, Lysidice parva, Lysidice robusta, Lysidice sulcata
- Genus Marphysa:
  - Marphysa depressa (Schmarda, 1861), syn. Eunice depressa
  - Marphysa sanguinea (Montagu, 1815), syn. Leodice opalina, Lysidice multicirrata, Marphysa acicularum, Marphysa acicularum brevibranchiata, Marphysa haemasoma, Marphysa iwamushi, Marphysa leidii, Marphysa nobilis, Marphysa parishii, Marphysa sanguinea americana, Marphysa viridis, Nereis sanguinea
  - Marphysa macintoshi Crossland, 1903
  - Marphysa purcellana Willey, 1904 endemic
  - Marphysa posteriobranchia Day, 1962 endemic
  - Marphysa corallina (Kinberg, 1865), syn. Marphysa capensis, Nauphanta corallina
- Genus Nematonereis:
  - Nematonereis unicornis Grube 1840, syn. Lumbriconereis unicornis, Nematonereis grubei, Nematonereis unicornis
- Genus Palola:
  - Palola siciliensis (Grube, 1840), syn. Eunice siciliensis, Nereidonta paretti, Palolo siciliensis

=== Lumbrineridae ===
Family Lumbrineridae

- Genus Lumbrineris:
  - Lumbrineris magalhaensis Kinberg, 1865, syn. Lumbriconereis magalhaensis, Lumbriconeries pettigrew
  - Lumbrineris meteorana Augener, 1931, syn. Lumbriconereis meteorana
  - Lumbrineris albidentata Ehlers, 1908, syn. Lumbriconereis albidentata
  - Lumbrineris brevicirra (Schmarda, 1861), syn. Lumbriconeris brevicirrus, Limbrinereis brevicirra, Notocirrus brevicirrus
  - Lumbrineris inflata Moore, 1911, syn. Lumbriconereis gurjanovea, Lumbrinereis cervicalis
  - Lumbrineris coccinea (Renier, 1804), syn. Lumbriconeris coccinea, Lumbrineris vasco, Nereis coccinea 1804
  - Lumbrineris oculata Ehlers, 1908, syn. Lumbriconereis oculata, endemic
  - Lumbrineris cavifrons Grube, 1866, syn. Lumbriconereis cavifrons, Lumbrinereis cavifrons
  - Lumbrineris latreilli Audouin & Milne Edwards, 1834, syn. Lumbriconereis edwardsii, Lumbriconereis floridana, Lumbriconereis futilis, Lumbriconereis nardonis, Lumbriconereis tingens, Zygolobus grubianus
  - Lumbrineris aberrans Day, 1963, syn. Lumbrinereis aberrans, endemic
  - Lumbrineris tetraura (Schmarda, 1861), syn. Lumbriconereis (Notocirrus) tetraura, Lumbriconereis tetraura, Lumbriconereis tetraura, Notocirrus tetraurus
  - Lumbrineris hartmani Day, 1953, syn. Lumbrinereis hartmani, endemic
  - Lumbrineris heteropoda Day, 1963, syn. Lumbrineris heteropoda atlantica
  - Lumbrineris heteropoda Marenzeller, 1879, syn. Lumbriconereis heteropoda
  - Lumbrineris papillifera Fauvel, 1918, syn. Lumbriconereis papillifera

=== Oenonidae ===
Family Oenonidae

- Genus Arabella:
  - Arabella mutans (Chamberlin, 1919), syn. Arabella novecrinita, Aracoda obscura, Cenothrix mutans
  - Arabella iricolor (Schmarda, 1861), syn. Aracoda caerulea, Aracoda capensis, Notocirrus capensis
- Genus Drilognathus:
  - Drilognathus capensis Day, 1960 endemic
- Genus Drilonereis:
  - Drilonereis monroi Day, 1960 endemic
  - Drilonereis falcata Moore 1911
- Genus Oenone:
  - Oenone fulgida (Savigny in Lamarck, 1818), syn. Aglaura fulgida, Aglaurides erythreaeensis, Aglaurides erythraeensis symmetrica, Aglaurides fulgida, Halla australis, Oenone diphyllidia, Oenone haswelli, Oenone lucida, Oenone pacifica, Oenone symetrica, Oenone telura, Oenone vitensis

=== Onuphidae ===
Family Onuphidae

- Genus Brevibrachium:
  - Brevibrachium capense Day, 1960, syn. Rhamphorachium capense, endemic
- Genus Diopatra:
  - Diopatra cuprea (Bosc, 1802), syn. Diopatra brasiliensis, Diopatra fragilis, Diopatra frontalis, Diopatra spiribranchis, Diopatra variegata, Nereis cuprea
  - Diopatra cuprea Ehlers 1908, syn. Diopatra punctifera, endemic
  - Diopatra dubia Day, 1960 endemic
  - Diopatra gilchristi Day, 1960, syn. Epidiopatra gilchristi endemic
  - Diopatra monroi Day, 1960 endemic
  - Diopatra neapolitana Delle Chiaje, 1841, syn. Diopatra baeri, Diopatra gallica, Diopatra iridicolor
  - Diopatra neapolitana Day, 1960 endemic
  - Diopatra papillosa Day, 1967, syn. Epidiopatra papillosa
- Genus Epidiopatra:
  - Epidiopatra hupferiana Day, 1957
- Genus Heptaceras:
  - Heptaceras quinquedens Day, 1951, syn. Onuphis quinquedens
- Genus Hyalinoecia:
  - Hyalinoecia tubicola (O.F. Müller, 1776), syn. Hyalinoecia platybranchis, Neris tubicola, Onuphis filicornis, Omnuphis sicula
- Genus Nothria:
  - Nothria conchylega (Sars, 1835), syn. Northria concyphilla, Onuphis britannica, Onuphis conchylega, Onuphis eschrichti, Onuphis hyperborea, Onuphis jopurdei
- Genus Onuphis:
  - Onuphis eremita Audouin & Milne Edwards, 1833, syn. Diopatra simplex, Onuphis landanensis, Onuphis pancerii
  - Onuphis geophiliformis (Moore, 1903)
  - Onuphis holobranchiata Marenzeller, 1879, syn. Onuphis (Nothria) holobranchiata
- Genus Paradiopatra:
  - Paradiopatra quadricuspis M. Sars in G.O. Sars 1872, syn. Onuphis quadricuspis, Sarsonuphis quadricuspis
- Genus Paronuphis:
  - Paronuphis antarctica (Monro, 1930), syn. Paranuphis abyssorum abyssorum
- Genus Rhamphobrachium:
  - Rhamphobrachium chuni Ehlers, 1908

== Phyllodocida ==
Order Phyllodocida

=== Acoetidae ===
Family Acoetidae

- Genus Panthalis:
  - Panthalis oesterdi McIntosh, 1924, endemic

=== Alciopidae ===
Family Alciopidae

- Genus Alciopa:
  - Alciopa reynaudii Audouin & Milne-Edwards, 1833
- Genus Alciopina:
  - Alciopina parasitica Claparède & Panceri, 1867
- Genus Krohnia:
  - Krohnia lepidota (Krohn, 1845), syn. Alciopa cirrata, Alciopa lepidota, Callizona cincinnata, Callizonella pigmenta
- Genus Naiades:
  - Naiades cantrainii Delle Chiaje, 1828, syn. Alciopa cantraini, Alciopa distorta, Alciopa edwardsii, Alciopa mutilata, Alciope microcephala, Liocapa vitrea
- Genus Plotohelmis:
  - Plotohelmis tenuis (Apstein, 1900), syn. Corynocephalus tenuis
  - Plotohelmis capitata (Greeff, 1876)
- Genus Rhynchonereella:
  - Rhynchonereella angelini (Kinberg, 1866), syn. Callizona grubei, Callizona henseni, Eulalia magnapupula, Kronia angelini, Rhynchonereella angelinia, Rhynchonerella angeleni, Rhynchonerella angelini, Rhynchonerella parva, Rhynchonerella pycnocera
  - Rhynchonereella gracilis Costa, 1864, syn. Callizona japonica, Callizona nasuta, Kronia aurorae
  - Rhynchonereella moebii (Apstein, 1893), syn. Callizona moebii, Rhynchonerella moebii
  - Rhynchonereella petersii (Langerhans, 1880), syn. Alciopa (Halodora) petersii, Alciopa cari, Corynocephalus magnachaetus, Rhynchonerella petersi, Rhynchonerella petersii, Vanadis heterochaeta, Vanadis setosa
- Genus Torrea:
  - Torrea candida (Delle Chiaje, 1841), syn. Alciopa candida, Alciopa vittata, Asterope candida, Liocapa vertebralis, Torrea vitrea
- Genus Vanadis:
  - Vanadis formosa Claparède, 1870, syn. Alciopa longirhyncha, Vanadis fuscapunctata, Vanadis greeffiana, Vanadis latocirrata, Vanadis longicauda, Vanadis pelagica, Vanadis uncinata
  - Vanadis crystallina Greeff, 1876, syn. Vanadis augeneri, Vanadis collata, Vanadis ornata
  - Vanadis minuta Treadwell, 1906
  - Vanadis violacea Apstein, 1893
  - Vanadis longissima (Levinsen, 1885), syn. Rhynchonerella longissima, Vanadis fasciata, Vanadis grandis, Vanadis pacifica

=== Aphroditidae ===
Family Aphroditidae

- Genus Aphrodita
  - Aphrodita alta Kinberg, 1856
- Genus Laetmonice
  - Laetmonice benthaliana McIntosh, 1885, syn. Laetmonice filicornis benthaliana, Laetmonice producta benthaliana
  - Laetmonice hystrix (Savigny in Lamarck, 1818), syn. Aphrodita mediterranea, Hermione hystrix, Hermonia hystrix, Iphione hystrix
- Genus Pontogenia
  - Pontogenia chrysocoma (Baird, 1865), syn. Aphrodita echinus, Aphrodite echinus, Hermione chrysocoma

=== Chrysopetalidae ===
Family Chrysopetalidae

- Genus Bhawania
  - Bhawania goodei Webster, 1884, syn. Chrysopetalum elegans, Palmyra elongata
- Genus Paleanotus
  - Paleanotus chrysolepis Schmarda, 1861

=== Eulepethidae ===
Family Eulepethidae

- Genus Grubeulepis
  - Grubeulepis geayi (Fauvel, 1918), syn. Eulepis geayi, Pareulepis geayi

=== Glyceridae ===
Family Glyceridae

- Genus Glycera
  - Glycera alba (O.F. Müller, 1776), syn. Glycera albicans, Glycera branchialis, Glycera danica, Nereis alba
  - Glycera benguellana Augener, 1931, syn. Glycera capitata benguellana
  - Glycera longipinnis Grube, 1878
  - Glycera natalensis Day, 1957, endemic
  - Glycera papillosa Grube, 1857
  - Glycera prashadi Fauvel, 1932, syn. Glycera convoluta capensis
  - Glycera subaenea Grube, 1878, syn. Glycera saccibranchis
  - Glycera tridactyla Schmarda, 1861, syn. Glycera convoluta, Glycera convoluta sevastopolica, Glycera convoluta suchumica, Glycera convoluta uncinata, Glycera retractilis
  - Glycera unicornis Savigny in Lamarck, 1818, syn. Glycera goesi, Glycera kraussii, Glycera meckelii, Glycera mesnili, Glycera nicobarica, Glycera rouxii

=== Goniadidae ===
Family Goniadidae

- Genus Glycinde
  - Glycinde capensis Day, 1960, endemic
  - Glycinde kameruniana Augener, 1918
- Genus Goniada
  - Goniada emerita Audouin & Milne-Edwards, 1833
  - Goniada maculata Örsted, 1843, syn. Glycera viridescens, Goniada alcockiana
- Genus Goniadella
  - Goniadella gracilis (Verrill, 1873), syn. Eone gracilis
- Genus Goniadopsis
  - Goniadopsis incerta (Fauvel, 1932)
  - Goniadopsis maskallensis (Gravier, 1904), syn. Glycinde maskallensis
- Genus Ophioglycera
  - Ophioglycera eximia (Ehlers, 1901)

=== Hesionidae ===
Family Hesionidae

- Genus Kefersteinia
  - Kefersteinia cirrata (Keferstein, 1863), syn. Castalia fusca hibernica, Hesione fusca, Kefersteinia claparedii, Psamathe cirrhata
- Genus Leocrates
  - Leocrates claparedii Costa in Claparede 1868, syn. Castalia claperedii, Leocrates giardi, Tyrrhena claparedii
- Genus Oxydromus
  - Oxydromus angustifrons (Grube, 1878), syn. Irma angustifrons, Irma latifrons, Ophiodromus angustifrons, Podarke angustifrons
  - Oxydromus agilis (Ehlers, 1864), syn. Ophiodromus agilis, Podarke agilis
- Genus Podarkeopsis
  - Podarkeopsis capensis (Day, 1963), syn. Gyptis capensis, Oxydromus capensis
- Genus Syllidia
  - Syllidia armata Quatrefages, 1866, syn. Magalia perarmata, Nereimyra britannica, Psammate britannica
  - Syllidia capensis (McIntosh, 1925), syn. Magalia capensis, endemic

=== Iospilidae ===
Family Iospilidae

- Genus Iospilus
  - Iospilus phalacroides Viguier, 1886, syn. Iospilus litoralis, Phalacrophorus niger

=== Lopadorrhynchidae ===
Family Lopadorrhynchidae

- Genus Lopadorrhynchus
  - Lopadorrhynchus krohnii Claparede, 1870, syn. Hydrophanes krohnii, Lopadorhynchus krohni, Lopadorrhynchus krohnii simplex, Lopadorrhynchus viguieri
- Genus Maupasia
  - Maupasia coeca Viguier, 1886, syn. Maupasia caeca
  - Maupasia gracilis (Reibisch, 1893), syn. Haliplanella pacifica, Haliplanes magna, Halyplanes gracilis
- Genus Prolopadorrhynchus
  - Prolopadorrhynchus appendiculatus Southern, 1909, syn. Lopadorhynchus appendiculatus, Lopadorrhynchus appendiculatus
  - Prolopadorrhynchus henseni Reibisch, 1895, syn. Lopadorhynchus henseni, Lopadorrhynchus henseni
  - Prolopadorrhynchus nationalis Reibisch, 1895, syn. Lopadorhynchus nationalis, Lopadorrhynchus nans
- Genus Pelagobia
  - Pelagobia longicirrata Greef, 1879, syn. Pelagobia erinensis, Pelagobia viguieri

=== Nereididae ===
Family Nereididae

- Genus Alitta
  - Alitta succinea (Leuckart, 1847), syn. Neanthes oxypoda, Neanthes perrieri, Neanthes succinea, Nereis (Alitta) oxypoda, Nereis (Neanthes) australis, Nereis (Neanthes) saltonin, Nereis (Neanthes) succinea, Nereis acutifolia, Nereis alatopalpis, Nereis belawanensis, Nereis glandulosa, Nereis limbata, Nereis reibischi, Nereis succinea,
- Genus Ceratonereis
  - Ceratonereis hircinicola (Eisig, 1870), syn. Ceratonereis hircinicola, Nereis (Ceratonereis) bartletti, Nereis (Ceratonereis) ehlersiana, Nereis (Ceratonereis) kinbergiana, Nereis hircinicola
  - Ceratonereis keiskama (Day, 1953), syn. Ceratonereis keiskama, endemic
- Genus Dendronereis
  - Dendronereis arborifera Peters, 1854
- Genus Dendronereides
  - Dendronereides zululandica Day, 1951
- Genus Laeonereis
  - Laeonereis ankyloseta Day, 1957
- Genus Micronereides
  - Micronereides capensis Day, 1963, endemic
- Genus Namanereis
  - Namanereis quadraticeps Blanchard in Gay, 1849, syn. Lycastis quadraticeps
- Genus Namalycastis
  - Namalycastis indica (Southern, 1921), syn. Lycastis indica
- Genus Neanthes
  - Neanthes agulhana (Day, 1963), syn. Nereis (Neanthes) agulhana
  - Neanthes papillosa (Day, 1963), syn. Nereis (Neanthes) papillosa, endemic
  - Neanthes willeyi (Day, 1934), syn. Neanthes capensis, Nereis (Neanthes) willeyi, Nereis willeyi
- Genus Nereis
  - Nereis caudata Delle Chiaje, 1841, syn. Nereis acuminata
  - Nereis coutieri Gravier, 1899, syn. Nereis coutierei
  - Nereis eugeniae (Kinberg, 1866)
  - Nereis falcaria (Willey, 1905), syn. Ceratonereis falcaria, Nereis kauderni
  - Nereis falsa Quatrefages, 1866, syn. Nereis (Nereilepas) parallelogramma, Nereis lucipeta
  - Nereis fusifera Quatrefages, 1866, endemic
  - Nereis gilchristi Day, 1967, syn. Nereis gilchristi
  - Nereis jacksoni Kinberg, 1866, syn. Nereis heirissonensis
  - Nereis lamellosa Ehlers, 1864
  - Nereis pelagica Linnaeus, 1758, syn. Heteronereis arctica, Heteronereis assimilis, Heteronereis grandifolia, Heteronereis migratoria, Nereilepas fusca, Nereis bowerbanckii, Nereis denticulata, Nereis ferruginea, Nereis fimbriata, Nereis fulgens, Nereis grandifolia, Nereis renalis, Nereis reynaudi, Nereis subulicola, Nereis verrucosa
  - Nereis persica Fauvel, 1911, syn. Nereis longiqua, Nereis zonata persica
- Genus Perinereis
  - Perinereis capensis (Kinberg, 1866), syn. Arete capensis
  - Perinereis cultrifera (Grube, 1840), syn. Lycoris lobulata, Nereis beaucoudrayi, Nereis cultrifera, Nereis incerta, Nereis margaritacea, Perinereis hedenborgi, Spio ventilabrum
  - Perinereis falsovariegata Monro, 1933
  - Perinereis nuntia (Grube, 1857)
- Genus Platynereis
  - Platynereis australis (Schmarda, 1861), syn. Heteronereis australis
  - Platynereis calodonta Kinberg, 1866, syn. Nereis (Platynereis) hewitti endemic
  - Platynereis dumerilii (Audouin & Milne Edwards, 1834), syn. Eunereis africana, Heteronereis fucicola, Heteronereis maculata, Heteronereis malmgreni, Leptonereis maculata, Mastigonereis quadridentata, Mastigonereis striata, Nereilepas variabilis, Nereis (Platynereis) dumerilii, Nereis agilis, Nereis alacris, Nereis antillensis, Nereis dumerilii, Nereis glasiovi, Nereis gracilis, Nereis megodon, Nereis peritonealis, Nereis taurica, Nereis zostericola, Platynereis dumerili, Platynereis jucunda, Uncinereis lutea, Uncinereis trimaculosa
- Genus Pseudonereis
  - Pseudonereis variegata (Grube, 1857), syn. Mastigonereis longicirra, Mastigonereis podocirra, Nereilepas variegata, Nereis (Nereilepas) stimpsonis, Nereis coerulea, Nereis ferox, Nereis mendax, Nereis microphthalma, Nereis obscura, Nereis variegata, Paranereis elegans, Perinereis diversidentata, Perinereis variegata, Phyllonereis benedenii
- Genus Simplisetia
  - Simplisetia erythraeensis (Fauvel, 1918), syn. Ceratonereis (Simplisetia) erythraeensis, Ceratonereis erythraeensis

=== Paralacydonidae ===
Family Paralacydonidae

- Genus Paralacydonia
  - Paralacydonia paradoxa Fauvel, 1913

=== Pholoidae ===
Family Pholoidae

- Genus Pholoe
  - Pholoe minuta (Fabricius, 1780), syn. Aphrodita minuta Fabricius, Palmyra ocellata, Pholoe eximia Johnston, Pholoe minuta eximia Johnson, Pholoe synophthalmica dinardensis, Polynoe minuta, Sigalion ocellatum
- Genus Pholoides
  - Pholoides dorsipapillatus (Marenzeller, 1893), syn. Peisidice bermudensis, Pholoe dorsipapillata, Pholoides bermudensis

=== Phyllodocidae ===
Family Phyllodocidae

- Genus Eteone
  - Eteone siphodonta Delle Chiaje, 1830
- Genus Eulalia
  - Eulalia bilineata (Johnston, 1840), syn. Eulalia bilineata, Eulalia fusca, Eulalia gracilis, Eulalia problema, Eulalia quadrilineata, Phyllodoce bilineata
  - Eulalia trilineata de Saint-Joseph, 1888
- Genus Eumida
  - Eumida sanguinea (Örsted, 1843), syn. Eulalia (Eumida) pallida, Eulalia flavescens, Eulalia granulosa, Eulalia pistacia, Eulalia sanguinea, Eumida communis, Eumida maculosa, Eumidia americana
- Genus Hypereteone
  - Hypereteone foliosa (Quatrefages, 1865), syn. Eteone foliosa
- Genus Nereiphylla
  - Nereiphylla castanea (Marenzeller, 1879), syn. Carobia castanea, Genetyllis castanea, Phyllodoce castanea
- Genus Notophyllum
  - Notophyllum splendens (Schmarda, 1861), syn. Macrophyllum leucopterum, Macrophyllum splendens, Notophyllum laciniatum
- Genus Protomystides
  - Protomystides capensis Day, 1960, endemic
- Genus Phyllodoce
  - Phyllodoce capensis Day, 1960, endemic
  - Phyllodoce longipes Kinberg, 1866, syn. Anaitides longipes, Paranaitis jeffreysii
  - Phyllodoce madeirensis Langerhans, 1880, syn. Anaitides madeirensis, Phyllodoce (Anaitides) africana, Phyllodoce (Anaitides) madeirensis
  - Phyllodoce tubicola Day, 1963, endemic
  - Phyllodoce schmardaei Day, 1963, syn. Phyllodoce macrophthalma
- Genus Sige
  - Sige falsa (Day, 1960), syn. Eulalia (Sige) falsa, endemic
  - Sige macroceros (Grube, 1860), syn. Eulalia (Pterocirrus) velifera, Eulalia macroceros, Eulalia volucris, Phyllodoce (Eulalia) macroceros
- Genus Steggoa
  - Steggoa capensis (Schmarda, 1861), syn. Eulalia capensis, Eulalia viridis capensis

=== Pilargidae ===
Family Pilargidae

- Genus Paracabira
  - Paracabira capensis (Day, 1963), syn. Loandalia capensis, Parandalia capensis, endemic
- Genus Sigambra
  - Sigambra constricta (Southern, 1921), syn. Ancistrosyllis constricta
  - Sigambra parva (Day, 1963), syn. Ancistrosyllis parva
- Genus Synelmis
  - Synelmis rigida (Fauvel, 1919), syn. Ancistrosyllis rigida, Kynephorus inermis

=== Polynoidae ===
Family Polynoidae

- Genus Alentia
  - Alentia australis (Monro, 1936), syn. Hololepida australis
- Genus Antinoe
  - Antinoe aequiseta Kinberg, 1856, syn. Antinoe aequiseta, Harmothoe aequiseta
  - Antinoe epitoca Monro, 1930
  - Antinoe lactea Day, 1953, endemic
- Genus Drieschia
  - Drieschia pelagica Michaelsen, 1892, syn. Drieschia caroli, Nectochaeta caroli
- Genus Eunoe
  - Eunoe assimilis McIntosh, 1924, endemic
  - Eunoe hubrechti (McIntosh, 1900), syn. Harmothoe hubrechti
  - Eunoe macrophthalma McIntosh, 1924, endemic
  - Eunoe nodulosa Day, 1967, endemic
- Genus Euphione
  - Euphione elisabethae McIntosh, 1885, endemic
- Genus Gorgoniapolynoe
  - Gorgoniapolynoe corralophila (Day, 1960), syn. Harmothoe corralophila, endemic
- Genus Halosydna
  - Halosydna alleni Day, 1934, syn. Halosydna (Hyperhalosydna) alleni, Halosydna alleni, Halosydnella alleni, endemic
- Genus Harmothoe
  - Harmothoe africana Augener, 1918, syn. Harmothoe aequiseta africana
  - Harmothoe antilopes McIntosh, 1876, syn. Evarne mazeli, Harmothoe antilopis
  - Harmothoe dictyophora (Grube, 1878), syn. Parmenis reticulata, Polynoe dictyophora, Polynoe dictyophorus
  - Harmothoe fraserthomsoni McIntosh, 1897, syn. Lagisca fraserthomsoni
  - Harmothoe gilchristi Day, 1960, syn. Harmothoe gilcristi
  - Harmothoe goreensis Augener, 1918, syn. Harmothoe (Harmothoe) goreensis
  - Harmothoe profunda Day, 1963, endemic
  - Harmothoe saldanha Day, 1953, endemic
  - Harmothoe serrata Day, 1963, syn. Harmothoe lagiscoides serrata, Harmothoe notochaetosa
  - Harmothoe waahli (Kinberg, 1856), syn. Harmothoe (Lagisca) waahli, Antinoe waahli, Polynoe mytilicola
- Genus Hemilepidia
  - Hemilepidia erythrotaenia Schmarda, 1861, syn. Eunoe capensis
- Genus Lepidasthenia
  - Lepidasthenia brunnea Day, 1960
  - Lepidasthenia elegans (Grube, 1840), syn. Lepidasthenia affinis, Polynoe blainvillei, Polynoe elegans, Polynoe lamprophthalma
  - Lepidasthenia microlepis Potts, 1910
- Genus Lepidonotus
  - Lepidonotus durbanensis Day, 1934
  - Lepidonotus glaucus (Peters, 1854), syn. Lepidonotus carinatus, Lepidonotus grisea, Lepidonotus platycirrus, Polynoe glauca, Polynoe grisea
  - Lepidonotus magnatuberculata Seidler, 1923
  - Lepidonotus semitectus (Stimpson, 1856), syn. Hermadion trochiscophora, Lepidonote semitecta, Lepidonotus wahlbergi, Polynoe trochiscophora, endemic
  - Lepidonotus tenuisetosus (Gravier, 1902), syn. Euphione tenuisetosa, Lepidonotus natalensis
- Genus Macellicephala
  - Macellicephala mirabilis (McIntosh, 1885), syn. Macellicephala (Macellicephala) mirabilis, Polynoe (Macellicephala) mirabilis
- Genus Malmgreniella
  - Malmgreniella agulhana (Day, 1960), syn. Harmothoe agulhana endemic
  - Malmgreniella capensis (McIntosh, 1885), syn. Malmgrenia purpurea, Parahalosydna capensis, Polynoe capensis, endemic
  - Malmgreniella lunulata (Delle Chiaje, 1830), syn. Harmothoe (Harmothoe) lunulata, Harmothoe lunulata, Harmothoe lunulata pacifica, Malmgrenia lunulata, Monoclea tesselata, Polynoa maculosa, Polynoe lunulata, Polynoe maculosa
- Genus Polyeunoa
  - Polyeunoa laevis McIntosh, 1885, syn. Enipo rhombigera, Eunoe agnae, Polyeunoa parvis, Polyeunoa rhombigera, Polyeunoe dubia, Polynoe agnae, Polynoe caputleonis, Polynoe thouarellicola
- Genus Polynoe
  - Polynoe scolopendrina Savigny, 1822, syn. Lepidonotus ornatus, Parapolynoe sevastopolica, Polynoe attenuata, Polynoe crassipalpa, Polynoe johnstoni, Polynoe variegata
- Genus Subadyte
  - Subadyte pellucida (Ehlers, 1864), syn. Adyte pellucida, Eumolphe fragilis, Hermadion fragile, Hermadion fugax, Hermadion pellucidum, Hermadion sabatieri, Pholoe brevicornis, Polynoe pellucida, Scalisetosus fragilis, Scalisetosus pellucidus

=== Pontodoridae ===
Family Pontodoridae

- Genus Pontodora
  - Pontodora pelagica Greeff, 1879, syn. Epitoka pelagica

=== Sigalionidae ===
Family Sigalionidae

- Genus Euthalenessa
  - Euthalenessa oculata (Peters, 1854), syn. Euthalenessa dendrolepis, Euthalenessa insignis, Leanira giardi, Sigalion oculatum, Thalenessa oculata
- Genus Fimbriosthenelais
  - Fimbriosthenelais zetlandica (McIntosh, 1876), syn. Sthenelais papillosa, Sthenelais sarsi, Sthenelais vachoni, Sthenelais zetlandica
- Genus Heteropelogenia
  - Heteropelogenia articulata (Day, 1960), syn. Psammolyce articulata, endemic
- Genus Leanira
  - Leanira hystricis Ehlers, 1874
- Genus Neoleanira
  - Neoleanira tetragona (Örsted, 1845), syn. Leanira tetragona, Sigalion buskii, Sigalion tetragonum, Sthenolepis tetragona
- Genus Pisione
  - Pisione africana Day, 1963, endemic
- Genus Pisionidens
  - Pisionidens indica Aiyar and Alikunhi 1940, syn. Fauveliella pulchra, Pisionella indica
- Genus Sigalion
  - Sigalion capensis Day, 1960, syn. Sigalion capense, endemic
  - Sigalion squamosus Delle Chiaje 1830, syn. Sigalion squamatum, Sigalion squamosum
- Genus Sthenelais
  - Sthenelais boa (Johnston, 1833), syn. Sigalion boa Johnston, Sigalion estellae, Sigalion idunae, Sthenelais audouini Quatrefages, Sthenelais ctenolepis, Sthenelais edwardsii, Sthenelais fuliginosa, Sthenelais fuliginosa capensis
  - Sthenelais limicola (Ehlers, 1864), syn. Aphrodita arcta, Sigalion limicola, Sthenelais leiolepis
- Genus Sthenelanella
  - Sthenelanella ehlersi (Horst, 1916), syn. Euleanira ehlersi

=== Sphaerodoridae ===
Family Sphaerodoridae

- Genus Sphaerodoropsis
  - Sphaerodoropsis benguellarum (Day, 1963), syn. Sphaerodoridium benguellarum, Sphaerodorum benguellarum, endemic
  - Sphaerodoropsis capense (Day, 1963), syn. Sphaerodoridium capense, Sphaerodorum capense, endemic
- Genus Sphaerodorum
  - Sphaerodorum gracile (Rathke, 1843)

=== Syllidae ===
Family Syllidae

- Genus Amblyosyllis
  - Amblyosyllis formosa (Claparède, 1863), syn. Amblyosillis algefnae, Amblyosillis plectorhyncha, Amblyosyllis algefnae, Amblyosyllis dorsigera, Amblyosyllis inmatura, Amblyosyllis inmaturata, Amblyosyllis lineata, Gattiola spectabilis, Pterosyllis dorsigera, Pterosyllis formosa, Pterosyllis plectorhyncha, Thylaciphorus hessii
- Genus Anguillosyllis
  - Anguillosyllis capensis Day, 1963, endemic
- Genus Autolytus
  - Autolytus bondei Day, 1934, endemic
  - Autolytus maclearanus McIntosh, 1885, syn. Autolytus gibber
  - Autolytus tuberculatus (Schmarda, 1861), syn. Cirrosyllis tuberculata, endemic
- Genus Branchiosyllis
  - Branchiosyllis exilis (Gravier, 1900), syn. Branchiosyllis uncinigera, Syllis (Typosyllis) cirropunctata, Syllis (Typosyllis) exilis, Syllis cirropunctata, Syllis exilis, Syllis solida, Trypanosyllis uncinigera, Typosyllis cirropunctata, Typosyllis exilis
- Genus Brania
  - Brania furcelligera Augener, 1913, syn. Grubea furcelligera
  - Brania rhopalophora (Ehlers, 1897), syn. Grubea rhopalophora
- Genus Epigamia
  - Epigamia charcoti (Gravier, 1906), syn. Autolytus (Regulatus) charcoti, Autolytus afer, Autolytus charcoti
- Genus Erinaceusyllis
  - Erinaceusyllis erinaceus (Claparède, 1863), syn. Sphaerosyllis (Sphaerosyllis) erinaceus, Sphaerosyllis brevifrons, Sphaerosyllis erinaceus
- Genus Eusyllis
  - Eusyllis assimilis Marenzeller, 1875, syn. Eusyllis monilicornis
- Genus Exogone
  - Exogone clavator Ehlers, 1913, endemic
  - Exogone naidina Örsted, 1845, syn. Exogone gemmifera, Exogone kefersteinii, Exogone naidina, Gossia longiseta, Paedophylax levis, Schmardia chauseyana
  - Exogone normalis Day, 1963, endemic
  - Exogone verugera (Claparède, 1868), syn. Paedophylex veruger, Exogone veruger
- Genus Exogonoides
  - Exogonoides antennata Day, 1963, endemic
- Genus Haplosyllis
  - Haplosyllis spongicola (Grube, 1855), syn. Haplosyllis (Syllis) hamata, Haplosyllis cephalata, Haplosyllis gula, Haplosyllis hamata, Haplosyllis maderensis, Haplosyllis oligachaete, Haplosyllis palpata, Haplosyllis spongicola tentaculata, Haplosyllis spongicola var. spongicola, Hemisyllis dispar, Nereis teticola, Syllis (Haplosyllis) djiboutiensis, Syllis (Haplosyllis) hamata, Syllis (Haplosyllis) spongicola, Syllis hamata, Syllis oligochaeta, Syllis setubalensis, Syllis spongicola, Syllis spongicola, Syllis streptocephala
  - Haplosyllis trifalcata (Day, 1960), syn. Syllis (Haplosyllis) trifalcata, endemic
- Genus Irmula
  - Irmula spissipes Ehlers, 1913
- Genus Lamellisyllis
  - Lamellisyllis comans Day, 1960, endemic
- Genus Langerhansia
  - Langerhansia anops (Ehlers, 1897), syn. Syllis (Ehlersia) anops
- Genus Myrianida
  - Myrianida phyllocera Augener, 1918
  - Myrianida prolifera (O.F. Müller, 1788), syn. Autolytus agassizii, Autolytus ehbiensis, Autolytus hesperidum, Autolytus prolifer, Autolytus prolifera, Crithida prolifera, Nereis prolifera, Polybostrichus mulleri
  - Myrianida pulchella Day, 1953, endemic
- Genus Odontosyllis
  - Odontosyllis polycera (Schmarda, 1861), syn. Odontosyllis suteri, Syllis polycera, Trypanosyllis occipitalis
- Genus Opisthosyllis
  - Opisthosyllis brunnea Langerhans, 1879
- Genus Paraehlersia
  - Paraehlersia ferrugina (Langerhans, 1881), syn. Ehlersia ferrugina, Ehlersia ferruginea, Langerhansia ferrugina, Syllis (Ehlersia) ferrugina, Syllis (Ehlersia) ferruginea, Syllis (Langerhansia) ferrugina, Syllis (Langerhansia) ferrugina, Syllis ferrugina, Syllis ferruginea, Typosyllis (Ehlersia) ferruginea, Typosyllis (Langerhansia) ferrugina, Typosyllis (Langerhansia) ferruginea
- Genus Pharyngeovalvata
  - Pharyngeovalvata natalensis Day, 1951, endemic
- Genus Pionosyllis
  - Pionosyllis ehlersiaeformis Augener, 1913
  - Pionosyllis longocirrata Saint Joseph, 1887, syn. Parapionosyllis longocirrata, Pionosyllis morenoae
  - Pionosyllis magnidens Day, 1953, endemic
  - Pionosyllis malmgreni McIntosh, 1869
- Genus Proceraea
  - Proceraea picta Ehlers, 1864, syn. Autolytus (Proceraea) picta, Autolytus pictus, Myrianida picta, Procerea scupularis
- Genus Procerastea
  - Procerastea nematodes Langerhans, 1884, syn. Procerastea perieri, Procerastea perrieri
- Genus Spermosyllis
  - Spermosyllis capensis Day, 1953, endemic
- Genus Sphaerosyllis
  - Sphaerosyllis capensis Day, 1953, syn. Sphaerosyllis hystrix capensis
  - Sphaerosyllis semiverrucosa Ehlers, 1913, endemic
  - Sphaerosyllis sublaevis Ehlers, 1913, endemic
- Genus Syllides
  - Syllides longocirratus (Örsted, 1845), syn. Syllides longicirrata, Syllides longocirrata, Syllis (Syllides) longocirrata, Syllis longicirrata, Syllis longocirrata
- Genus Syllis
  - Syllis amica Quatrefages, 1866, syn. Ehlersia (Syllis) simplex, Ehlersia simplex, Syllis (Ehlersia) aesthetica, Syllis (Ehlersia) simplex, Syllis (Typosyllis) amica, Syllis aesthetica, Syllis cunninghami, Typosyllis (Syllis) amica, Typosyllis amica
  - Syllis armillaris (O.F. Müller, 1776), syn. Ioda macrophthalma, Ioida macrophthalma, Ioida macrophthalmus, Lycastis armillaris, Nereis armillaris, Nereisyllis ornata, Pionosyllis alternosetosa, Syllis (Typosyllis) alternosetosa, Syllis (Typosyllis) armillaris, Syllis (Typosyllis) capensis, Syllis (Typosyllis) tortugaensis, Syllis alternosetosa, Syllis brachychaeta, Syllis capensis, Syllis closterobranchia, Syllis crassicornis, Syllis danica, Syllis lineata, Syllis macrophthalma, Syllis syllisformis, Syllis tigrina, Syllis tortugaensis, Trichosyllis sylliformis, Trichosyllis syllisformis, Typosyllis (Syllis) armillaris, Typosyllis (Syllis) capensis, Typosyllis (Typosyllis) armillaris, Typosyllis armillaris, Typosyllis brachychaeta, Typosyllis capensis, Typosyllis closterobranchia, Typosyllis tortugaensis
  - Syllis cornuta Rathke, 1843, syn. Ehlersia (Syllis) cornuta, Ehlersia cornuta, Langerhansia cornuta, Langerhansia cornuta hystricis, Syllis (Ehlersia) cornuta, Syllis (Langerhansia) cornuta, Syllis (Typosyllis) cornuta, Syllis (Typosyllis) harti, Syllis cornuta collingsii, Syllis fabricii, Syllis pallida, Typosyllis (Ehlersia) cornuta, Typosyllis (Langerhansia) cornuta, Typosyllis cornuta
  - Syllis gracilis Grube, 1840, syn. Syllis (Syllis) gracilis, Syllis (Syllis) longissima, Syllis brachycirris, Syllis longissima, Syllis mixtosetosa, Syllis navicellidens, Syllis nigrovittata, Syllis nigro-vittata, Syllis palifica, Syllis quadridentata, Syllis vancaurica
  - Syllis hyalina Grube, 1863, syn. Pionosyllis hyalina, Syllis (Typosyllis) hyalin, Syllis (Typosyllis) hyalina, Syllis (Typosyllis) melanopharyngea, Syllis (Typosyllis) tristanensis, Syllis borealis, Syllis hialina, Syllis macrocola, Syllis pellucida, Syllis simillima, Syllis velox, Typosyllis (Syllis) hyalina, Typosyllis (Syllis) velox, Typosyllis (Typosyllis) hyalina, Typosyllis aciculata orientalis, Typosyllis hyalina, Typosyllis melanopharyngea, Typosyllis orientalis, Typosyllis tristanensis
  - Syllis prolifera Krohn, 1852, syn. Gnathosyllis zonata, Pionosyllis prolifera, Syllis (Typosyllis) bouvieri, Syllis (Typosyllis) prolifera, Syllis (Typosyllis) zonata, Syllis armandi, Syllis bouvieri, Syllis fiumensis, Syllis fluminensis, Syllis lussinensis, Syllis nigrans, Syllis zonata, Typosyllis (Syllis) nigrans, Typosyllis (Syllis) prolifera, Typosyllis (Typosyllis) prolifera, Typosyllis bouvieri, Typosyllis nigrans, Typosyllis prolifera, Typosyllis zonata
  - Syllis variegata Grube, 1860, syn. Isosyllis armoricana, Syllis (Typosyllis) variegata, Syllis (Typosyllis) variegata variegata, Syllis armoricana, Syllis aurantiaca, Syllis hexagonifera, Syllis nigropunctata, Syllis oblonga, Syllis schmardian, Syllis variegata profunda, Syllis variegata variegata, Syllis varlegata, Thoe fusiformis, Typosyllis (Syllis) aurantiaca, Typosyllis (Syllis) variegata, Typosyllis (Typosyllis) variegata, Typosyllis armoricana, Typosyllis aurantiaca, Typosyllis cirromaculata, Typosyllis variegata', 'Typosyllis variegata profunda
  - Syllis vittata Grube, 1840, syn. Syllis (Typosyllis) vittata, Syllis aurita, Syllis buskii, Syllis nigropharyngea, Typosyllis (Syllis) vittata, Typosyllis (Typosyllis) vittata, Typosyllis vitatta, Typosyllis vittata
- Genus Trypanosyllis
  - Trypanosyllis aeolis Langerhans, 1879, syn. Trypanosyllis (Trypanedenta) gemmipara, Trypanosyllis gemmipara
  - Trypanosyllis ankyloseta Day, 1960, endemic
  - Trypanosyllis gemmulifera Augener, 1918
  - Trypanosyllis prampramensis Augener, 1918
  - Trypanosyllis zebra (Grube, 1840), syn. Syllis rubra, Syllis zebra, Trypanosyllis krohnii
- Genus Typosyllis
  - Typosyllis benguellana (Day, 1963), syn. Syllis benguellana, endemic

=== Tomopteridae ===
Family Tomopteridae

- Genus Enapteris
  - Enapteris euchaeta Chun, 1888, syn. Tomopteris euchaeta
- Genus Tomopteris
  - Tomopteris cavalli Rosa, 1908
  - Tomopteris dunckeri Rosa, 1908, syn. Tomopteris dunckeri, Tomopteris membranacea
  - Tomopteris helgolandica (Greeff, 1879)
  - Tomopteris krampi Wesenberg-Lund, 1936
  - Tomopteris ligulata Rosa, 1908
  - Tomopteris nationalis Apstein, 1900
  - Tomopteris pacifica (Izuka, 1914), syn. Tomopteris elegans, Tomopteris kefersteini, Tomopteris pacifica, Tomopteris renata
  - Tomopteris planktonis Apstein, 1900
  - Tomopteris septentrionalis Steenstrup, 1849, syn. Tomopteris eschscholtzii

=== Typhloscolecidae ===
Family Typhloscolecidae

- Genus Sagitella
  - Sagitella kowalewskii Wagner, 1872, syn. Acicularia virchowii, Plotobia paucichaeta, Sagitella kowalevskii, Sagitella kowalevskyi, Sagitella kowalewski, Typhloscolex paucichaeta
- Genus Travisiopsis
  - Travisiopsis lanceolata Southern, 1910, syn. Plotobia simplex, Sagitella cornuta, Travisiopsis atlantica
  - Travisiopsis dubia Støp-Bowitz, 1948
- Genus Typhloscolex
  - Typhloscolex muelleri Busch, 1851

=== Nephtyidae ===
Family Nephtyidae

- Genus Aglaophamus
  - Aglaophamus dibranchis (Grube, 1877), syn. Nephthys dibranchis, Nephthys mirasetis, Nephtys dibranchis
  - Aglaophamus macroura Schmarda 1861, syn. Nephtys macroura
- Genus Micronephthys
  - Micronephthys sphaerocirrata (Wesenberg-Lund, 1949), syn. Nephthys sphaerocirrata, Nephtys sphaerocirrata
- Genus Nephtys
  - Nephtys capensis Day, 1953, endemic
  - Nephtys hombergii Savigny in Lamarck, 1818, syn. Nephthys ehlersi, Nephthys hombergi, Nephthys langerhansi, Nephthys macandrewi, Nephthys maeotica, Nephthys neapolitana, Nereis scolopendriodes
  - Nephtys tulearensis Fauvel, 1919, syn. Nephthys tulearensis

== Sabellida ==
Order Sabellida

=== Fabriciidae ===
Family Fabriciidae

- Genus Fabricia
  - Fabricia bansei Day, 1961, endemic
  - Fabricia capensis Monro, 1937, endemic
- Genus Pseudofabriciola
  - Pseudofabriciola filamentosa Day, 1963, syn. Fabricia filamentosa, endemic

=== Oweniidae ===
Family Oweniidae

- Genus Owenia
  - Owenia fusiformis Delle Chiaje, 1844, syn. Ammochares aedificator, Ammochares assimilis, Ammochares brasiliensis, Ammochares occidentale, Ammochares orientalis, Ammochares ottonis, Ammochares sundevalli, Ammochares tegula, Ammochares tenuis, Ops digitata, Owenia brachycera, Owenia filiformis

=== Sabellariidae ===
Family Sabellariidae

- Genus Gesaia
  - Gesaia elegans (Fauvel, 1911), syn. Phalacrostemma elegans
- Genus Gunnarea
  - Gunnarea gaimardi (Quatrefages, 1848), syn. Gunnarea capensis, Hermella capensis, Pallasia gaimardi, Sabellaria capensis, endemic
- Genus Idanthyrsus
  - Idanthyrsus pennatus (Peters, 1854), syn. Crytopomatus geayi, Pallasia pennata, Sabellaria (Pallasia) pennata
- Genus Lygdamis
  - Lygdamis gilchristi (McIntosh, 1924), syn. Lygdamis muratus gilchristi, Tetreres murata gilchristi, endemic
  - Lygdamis indicus Kinberg, 1866
- Genus Sabellaria
  - Sabellaria pectinata Fauvel, 1932, syn. Sabellaria pectinata intermedia
  - Sabellaria intoshi Fauvel, 1914, syn. Sabellaria spinulosa gravieri, Sabellaria spinulosa intoshi
  - Sabellaria alcocki Gravier 1906, syn. Sabellaria spinulosa alcocki

=== Sabellidae ===
Family Sabellidae

- Genus Amphiglena
  - Amphiglena mediterranea (Leydig, 1851), syn. Amphicora mediterranea, Amphicorina desiderata
- Genus Branchiomma
  - Branchiomma capensis McIntosh 1885, syn. Dasychone argus capensis, endemic
  - Branchiomma natalensis Kinberg, 1867, syn. Dasychone violacea, Sabella luxuriosa, Sabella natalensis
  - Branchiomma nigromaculatum Baird 1865, syn. Bispira nigromaculata, Dasychone argus chefinae, Dasychone corollifera, Dasychone loandensis, Dasychone ponce, Sabella lynceus, Sabella nigromaculata, Dasychone nigromaculata, Branchiomma nigromaculata
  - Branchiomma serratibranchis Grube 1878, syn. Sabella (Dasychone) serratibranchis
  - Branchiomma violacea Schmarda, 1861, syn. Dasychone capensis, Dasychone foliosa, Dasychone violacea natalensis, Dasychone violacea, Sabella folifera
- Genus Chone
  - Chone letterstedti Kinberg 1867, syn. Euchone letterstedi, Parachonia letterstedi, endemic
- Genus Desdemona
  - Desdemona ornata Banse 1957
- Genus Euchone
  - Euchone capensis Day 1961, endemic
  - Euchone rosea Langerhans 1884
- Genus Fabricinuda
  - Fabricinuda mossambica Day 1957, syn. Fabricia mossambica, Fabriciola mossambica
- Genus Hypsicomus
  - Hypsicomus capensis Day, 1961, endemic
- Genus Jasmineira
  - Jasmineira elegans Saint-Joseph 1894, syn. Jasmineira caducibranchiata
- Genus Megalomma
  - Megalomma quadrioculatum (Willey, 1905)
- Genus Myxicola
  - Myxicola infundibulum Renier 1804, syn. Amphitrite floscula, Amphitrite infundibulum, Eriographis borealis, Leiobranchus modestus, Myxicola affinis, Myxicola conjuncta, Myxicola grubii, Myxicola michaelseni, Myxicola modesta, Myxicola monacis, Myxicola, pacifica, Myxicola parasites, Myxicola platychaeta, Myxicola sarsii, Myxicola steenstrupi, Myxicola, villosa, Myxicola viridis, Sabella gelatinosa, Sabella villosa, Sabella viridis, Terebella buccinea, Terebella infundibulum, Tuba divisa
- Genus Oriopsis
  - Oriopsis ehlersi Day 1961, endemic
  - Oriopsis eimeri Langerhans 1880, syn. Oria eimera
  - Oriopsis neglecta Banse 1957
  - Oriopsis parvula Ehlers 1913, syn. Oria parvula, Oridia parvula, endemic
- Genus Paradialychone
  - Paradialychone filicaudata Southern 1914, syn. Chone filicaudata
- Genus Potamilla
  - Potamilla linguicollaris Day, 1961, endemic
  - Potamilla torelli Malmgren, 186
- Genus Pseudopotamilla
  - Pseudopotamilla reniformis (Bruguière, 1789), syn. Amphitrite reniformis, Potamilla obscura, Potamilla reniformis, Potamilla troncatula, Sabella aspera, Sabella oculata, Sabella reniformis
- Genus Sabella
  - Sabella spallanzanii (Gmelin, 1791), syn. Corallina Tubularia-Melitensis, Sabella penicillus, Serpula penicillus, Spirographis spallanzanii
- Genus Sabellastarte
  - Sabellastarte longa Kinberg 1867, syn. Dasychone odhneri, Sabella longa
  - Sabellastarte sanctijosephi Gravier 1906, syn. Eurato sanctijosephi

=== Serpulidae ===
Family Serpulidae

- Genus Ficopomatus
  - Ficopomatus enigmatica Fauvel 1923, syn. Mercierella enigmatica, Phycopomatus enigmaticus
- Genus Filograna
  - Filograna implexa Berkley 1835, syn. Filigrana implexa, Filigrana implexa sarsii, Filograna berkeleyi, Filograna schleideni, Serpula complexa, Serpula corallifica, Serpula filiformis, Serpula filograna, Tubipora filogranum, Tubipora ramosa
- Genus Hydroides
  - Hydroides bifurcatus Pixell 1913, syn. Eupomatus bifurcatus, Hydroides bifurcata
  - Hydroides dipoma Schmarda 1861, syn. Codonytes dipoma, Enpomatus dipoma, Eupomatus spinosus, Hydroides spinosus, Hydroides spinoza, Hydroides uncinatus macronyx
  - Hydroides diramphus Mörch, 1863, syn. Eucarphus serratus, Eupomatus dirampha, Eupomatus lunifer, Eupomatus lunulifer, Hydroides (Eucarphus) benzoni, Hydroides (Eucarphus) cumingii, Hydroides (Eucarphus) dirampha, Hydroides benzoni, Hydroides cumingii, Hydroides lunulifera, Hydroides malleophorus, Hydroides serratus, Serpula (Hydroides) lunulifera, Vermilia benzonii, Vermilia cumingii, Vermilia dirampha
  - Hydroides norvegicus Gunnerus 1768, syn. Eupomatus vermicularis, Hydroides nervegica, Sabella euplacana, Serpula (Eupomatus) pectinata, Serpula (Eupomatus) reversa, Serpula angulata, Serpula contortus, Serpula muelleri, Serpula norwegica, Serpula reversa, Serpula solitaria, Serpula vermicularis, Spirobis reversus, Vermilia incerta, Vermilia pectinata
- Genus Leodora
  - Leodora laevis Quatrefages 1866, syn. Spirorbis laevis, Spirorbis (Laeospira) laevis
- Genus Neovermilia
  - Neovermilia capensis Day 1961, endemic
- Genus Pomatoceros
  - Pomatoceros caeruleus Schmarda 1861, syn. Pomatoceros coeruleus, Vermilia caerulea
- Genus Protolaeospira
  - Protolaeospira capensis Day 1961, syn. Paralaeospira capensis, Protolaeospira capensis, Protolaeospira translucens
- Genus Protula
  - Protula anomala Day 1955, syn. Protula tubularia anomala, endemic
  - Protula bispiralis Savigny 1820, syn. Protula (Philippiprotula) magnifica, Protula magnifica, Serpula (Spiramella) bispiralis, Serpula bispiralis, Spiramella bispiralis
  - Protula tubularia Montagu 1803, syn. Protula (Protula) tubularia, Protula (Protula) tuburalia, Protula (Psygmobranchus) protensa, Protula (Psygmobranchus) tubularia, Protula borealis, Protula capensis, Protula elegans, Protula meilhaci, Protula protensa, Protula rudolphi, Protula tabularia, Protula tubularia capensis, Protula tubularia tubularia, Psygmobranchus elegans, Psygmobranchus intermedius, Psygmobranchus pratensis, Psygmobranchus protensus, Psygmobranchus simplex, Psygmobranchus tubularis, Serpula arundo, Serpula tubularia
- Genus Pseudochitinopoma
  - Pseudochitinopoma capensis Day 1961, syn. Chitinopoma capensis, Ficopomatus capensis, endemic
- Genus Pseudovermilia
  - Pseudovermilia babylonia Day 1967, syn. Vermiliopsis babylonia
- Genus Serpula
  - Serpula vermicularis Linnaeus 1767, syn. Serpula (Serpula) aspera, Serpula (Serpula) pallida, Serpula aspera, Serpula contortuplicata, Serpula crater, Serpula cristata, Serpula echinata, Serpula fascicularis, Serpula gervaisii, Serpula interrupta, Serpula montagui, Serpula pallida, Serpula philippi, Serpula proboscidea, Serpula rugosa, Serpula venusta, Serpula vermicularis echinata, Serpula vermicularis vermicularis, Vermilia vermicularis
- Genus Spirobranchus
  - Spirobranchus giganteus Pallas 1766, syn. Cymospira bicornis, Cymospira cervina, Cymospira gigantea, Cymospira megasoma, Cymospira rubus, Olga elegantissima, Penicillum marinum, Pomatoceros oerstedi, Serpula (Cymospira) gigantea, Serpula (Galeolaria) gigantea, Serpula bicornis, Serpula gigantea, Spirobranchus (Cymospira) giganteus, Spirobranchus giganteus giganteus, Spirobranchus giganteus microceras, Spirobranchus giganteus tricornis, Spirobranchus megasoma, Spirobranchus tricornis, Terebella bicornis
  - Spirobranchus kraussi Baird 1865, syn. Pomatoceros (Pomatoleios) caerulescens, Pomatoleios caerulescens, Pomatoleios crosslandi, Pomatoleios kraussii, Pomatoleios kraussii manilensis
- Genus Spirorbis
  - Spirorbis foraminosus Bush 1905, syn. Spirorbis (Dexiospira) foraminosus
  - Spirorbis patagonicus Caullery and Mesnil 1897
- Genus Vermiliopsis
  - Vermiliopsis glandigerus Gravier 1906, syn. Vermiliopsis glandigera, Vermiliopsis glandigerius

== Spionida ==
Order Spionida

=== Chaetopteridae ===
Family Chaetopteridae

- Genus Chaetopterus
  - Chaetopterus capensis Stimpson, 1855, syn. Chaetopterus hamatus
- Genus Mesochaetopterus
  - Mesochaetopterus capensis (McIntosh, 1885), syn. Ranzania capensis
  - Mesochaetopterus minutus Potts, 1914
- Genus Phyllochaetopterus
  - Phyllochaetopterus elioti Crossland, 1903
  - Phyllochaetopterus herdmani (Hornell in Willey, 1905), syn. Spiochaetopterus herdmani
  - Phyllochaetopterus socialis Claparède, 1869, syn. Mesotrocha sexoculata, Phyllochaetopterus fallax, Phyllochaetopterus pictus
- Genus Spiochaetopterus
  - Spiochaetopterus costarum (Claparède, 1869), syn. Telepsavus bonhourei, Telepsavus costarum, Telepsavus vitrarius
  - Spiochaetopterus typicus M. Sars, 1856

=== Magelonidae ===
Family Magelonidae

- Genus Magelona
  - Magelona capensis Day, 1961
  - Magelona cincta Ehlers, 1908
  - Magelona debeerei Clarke, Paterson, Florence, Gibbons 2010, syn. Magelona papillicornis

=== Spionidae ===
Family Spionidae

- Genus Aonidella
  - Aonidella cirrobranchiata (Day, 1961), syn. Minuspio cirrobranchiata, Prionospio cirrobranchiata
- Genus Aonides
  - Aonides oxycephala (Sars, 1862), syn. Aonides auricularis, Nerine oxycephala
- Genus Boccardia
  - Boccardia polybranchia (Haswell, 1885), syn. Perialla claparedei, Polydora (Leucodore) polybranchia, Polydora euryhalina
  - Boccardia pseudonatrix Day, 1961, endemic
- Genus Boccardiella
  - Boccardiella ligerica (Ferronnière, 1898), syn. Boccardia ligerica, Boccardia redeki, Polydora (Boccardiella) ligerica, Polydora redeki
- Genus Dipolydora
  - Dipolydora capensis (Day, 1955), syn. Polydora capensis, endemic
  - Dipolydora coeca (Örsted, 1843), syn. Leipoceras uviferum, Leucodore coecum, Polydora (Polydora) coeca, Polydora caeca
  - Dipolydora giardi (Mesnil, 1896), syn. Polydora (Polydora) giardi, Polydora giardi
  - Dipolydora keulderae Simon 2011, endemic
  - Dipolydora normalis (Day, 1957), syn. Polydora normalis
- Genus Dispio
  - Dispio magnus Day 1955, syn. Spio magnus, Dispio magna, endemic
- Genus Laonice
  - Laonice cirrata (M. Sars, 1851), syn. Aricidea alata, Aricideopsis megalops, Chaetosphaera falconis, Laonice pugettensis, Nerine cirrata, Scolecolepis cirrata, Spionides cirratus
- Genus Malacoceros
  - Malacoceros indicus (Fauvel, 1928), syn. Scolecolepis indica
- Genus Paraprionospio
  - Paraprionospio pinnata (Ehlers, 1901), syn. Paraprionospio tribranchiata, Prionospio (Paraprionospio) pinnata, Prionospio africana, Prionospio ornata, Prionospio pinnata
- Genus Polydora
  - Polydora dinthwanyana Simon 2011, endemic
  - Polydora flava Claparede, 1870, syn. Polydora dorsomaculata, Polydora pusilla
  - Polydora hoplura Claparede, 1870, syn. Polydora hoplura hoplura
  - Polydora maculata Day, 1963, endemic
- Genus Prionospio
  - Prionospio cirrifera Wirén, 1883, syn. Laonice cirrata, Minuspio cirrifera
  - Prionospio ehlersi Fauvel, 1928
  - Prionospio malmgreni Claparède, 1869, syn. Prionospio bocki, Prionospio capensis
  - Prionospio saldanha Day, 1961, syn. Apoprionospio saldanha
  - Prionospio sexoculata Augener, 1918, syn. Aquilaspio sexoculata
  - Prionospio steenstrupi Malmgren, 1867, syn. Prionospio (Prionospio) steenstrupi
- Genus Pseudopolydora
  - Pseudopolydora antennata (Claparède, 1869), syn. Polydora (Pseudopolydora) antennata, Polydora antennata
  - Pseudopolydora dayii Simon, 2009, endemic
- Genus Pygospio
  - Pygospio elegans Claparède, 1863, syn. Pygospio minutus, Spio inversa, Spio rathbuni
- Genus Rhynchospio
  - Rhynchospio glutaea Ehlers, 1897, syn. Rhynchospio arenincola, Rhynchospio arenincola asiatica, Scolecolepis cornifera, Scolecolepis glutaea
- Genus Scolelepis
  - Scolelepis gilchristi (Day, 1961), syn. Nerinides gilchristi, Pseudomalacoceros gilchristi
  - Scolelepis squamata (Muller, 1806), syn. Lumbricus cirratulus, Nereis foliata, Nerine agilis, Nerine capensis, Nerine cirratulus, Nerine cirratulus chilensis, Nerine heteropoda, Nerine minuta, Nerinides agilis, Nerinides goodbodyi, Scolelepis agilis
- Genus Spio
  - Spio filicornis (Müller, 1776), syn. Nereis filicornis, Spio gattyi
- Genus Spiophanes
  - Spiophanes bombyx (Claparède, 1870), syn. Spio bombyx, Spiophanes verrilli
  - Spiophanes duplex (Chamberlin, 1919), syn. Spiophanes chilensis, Spiophanes missionensis, Spiophanes soderstromi, Spiophanes soederstroemi

=== Poecilochaetidae ===
Family Poecilochaetidae

- Genus Poecilochaetus
  - Poecilochaetus serpens Allen, 1904

== Terebellida ==
Order Terebellida

=== Ampharetidae ===
Family Ampharetidae

- Genus Ampharete
  - Ampharete acutifrons (Grube, 1860), syn. Ampharete cirrata, Amphicteis acutifrons, Branchiosabella zostericola
  - Ampharete agulhasensis (Day, 1961), syn. Lysippe agulhasensis, endemic
  - Ampharete capensis (Day, 1961), syn. Lysippe capensis
- Genus Amphicteis
  - Amphicteis gunneri (M. Sars, 1835), syn. Amphicteis curvipalea, Amphicteis groenlandica, Amphicteis gunneri japonica, Amphicteis japonica, Amphitrite gunneri, Crossostoma midas
- Genus Glyphanostomum
  - Glyphanostomum abyssale Day, 1967
- Genus Isolda
  - Isolda pulchella Müller in Grube, 1858, syn. Isolda sibogae, Isolda warnbroensis, Isolda whydahaensis
- Genus Melinna
  - Melinna cristata (M. Sars, 1851), syn. Sabellides cristata
- Genus Melinnopsides
  - Melinnopsides capensis (Day, 1955), syn. Melinnopsis capensis, endemic
- Genus Phyllocomus
  - Phyllocomus hiltoni (Chamberlin, 1919), syn. Schistocomus hiltoni
- Genus Pterampharete
  - Pterampharete leuderitzi Augener 1918, syn. Sabellides (Pterampharete) luderitzi
- Genus Sabellides
  - Sabellides capensis Day, 1961
  - Sabellides octocirrata (M. Sars, 1835), syn. Heterobranchus speciosus, Sabella octocirrata, Sabellides octocirrata mediterranea
- Genus Samythella
  - Samythella affinis Day, 1963

=== Cirratulidae ===
Family Cirratulidae

- Genus Aphelochaeta
  - Aphelochaeta filiformis (Keferstein, 1862), syn. Cirratulus filicornis, Cirratulus filiformis, Cirratulus norvegicus, Cirratulus tesselatus
  - Aphelochaeta marioni (Saint-Joseph, 1894), syn. Heterocirrus marioni, Tharyx marioni
- Genus Caulleriella
  - Caulleriella acicula Day, 1961, endemic
  - Caulleriella capensis (Monro, 1930), syn. Caulleriella afra, Dodecaceria afra, Heterocirrus caputesocis capensis, endemic
- Genus Chaetozone
  - Chaetozone setosa Malmgren, 1867, syn. Cirratulus longisetis
- Genus Cirratulus
  - Cirratulus concinnus Ehlers, 1908, endemic
  - Cirratulus gilchristi Day, 1961, endemic
- Genus Cirriformia
  - Cirriformia capensis (Schmarda, 1861), syn. Cirratulus australis, Cirratulus capensis
  - Cirriformia chrysoderma (Claparède, 1869), syn. Audouinia chrysoderma, Cirratulus chrysoderma
  - Cirriformia filigera (Delle Chiaje, 1828), syn. Audouinia filigera, Audouinia oculata, Audouinia pygidia, Cirratulus australis, Cirratulus chiajei, Cirratulus cincinnatus, Lumbricus filigerus
  - Cirriformia punctata Grube, 1859, syn. Cirratulus multicirratus, Cirratulus niger, Cirratulus nigromaculatus, Cirrhatulus punctatus
  - Cirriformia tentaculata (Montagu, 1808), syn. Cirratulus atrocollaris, Cirratulus borealis, Cirratulus comosus, Cirratulus lamarckii, Terebella tentaculata
- Genus Dodecaceria
  - Dodecaceria capensis Day, 1961
  - Dodecaceria laddi Hartman, 1954
  - Dodecaceria pulchra Day, 1955
- Genus Monticellina
  - Monticellina dorsobranchialis (Kirkegaard, 1959), syn. Cirratulus dorsobranchialis, Tharyx dorsobranchialis
- Genus Tharyx
  - Tharyx annulosus Hartman, 1965, syn. Zeppelina prolonga
  - Tharyx filibranchia Day, 1961, endemic

=== Flabelligeridae ===
Family Flabelligeridae

- Genus Brada
  - Brada capensis Day 1961
- Genus Daylithos
  - Daylithos parmata (Grube, 1877), syn. Pherusa parmata, Stylariodes parmata, Stylariodes parmatus
- Genus Diplocirrus
  - Diplocirrus capensis Day, 1961
- Genus Flabelligera
  - Flabelligera affinis M. Sars, 1829, syn. Amphitrite plumosa, Chloraema dujardinii, Chloraema edwardsii, Chloraema pellucidum, Chloraema sordidum, Flabelligera claparedii, Flabelligera marenzelleri, Pherusa tetragona, Siphonostoma affine, Siphonostoma buskii, Siphonostoma gelatinosa, Siphonostoma vaginiferum, Siphostoma uncinata, Tecturella flaccida, Tecturella luctator
- Genus Pherusa
  - Pherusa laevis (Stimpson, 1856), syn. Siphonostoma laeve, Stylarioides laevis, Trophonia xanthotricha, endemic
  - Pherusa monroi (Day, 1957), syn. Stylarioides monroi
  - Pherusa saldanha Day, 1961, endemic
  - Pherusa swakopiana (Augener, 1918), syn. Stylarioides swakopianus
- Genus Piromis
  - Piromis arenosus Kinberg, 1866, syn. Piromis capensis, Pycnoderma fernandense, Stylarioides arenosus, Trophonia capensis

=== Pectinariidae ===
Family Pectinariidae

- Genus Lagis
  - Lagis koreni Malmgren, 1866, syn. Pectinaria (Lagis) koreni, Pectinaria (Lagis) neapolitana, Pectinaria (Lagis) pseudokoreni, Pectinaria koreni, Pectinaria malmgreni, Pectinaria neapolitana, Pectinaria robusta, Solen fragilis
  - Lagis koreni (Day, 1963), syn. Pectinaria (Lagis) koreni cirrata, endemic
- Genus Pectinaria
  - Pectinaria capensis (Pallas, 1766), syn. Nereis cylindraria capensis, Sabella capensis, Sabella chrysodon, Sabella indica, Pectinaria (Amphictene) capensis

=== Sternaspidae ===
Family Sternaspidae

- Genus Sternaspis
  - Sternaspis scutata Ranzani, 1817, syn. Thalassema scutatus

=== Terebellidae ===
Family Terebellidae

- Genus Amaeana
  - Amaeana accraensis (Augener, 1918), syn. Amaea accraensis
  - Amaeana trilobata (Sars, 1863), syn. Polycirrus trilobatus
- Genus Amphitrite
  - Amphitrite cirrata (O. F. Müller, 1771 in 1776), syn. Amphiro cirrata, Amphiro foetida, Amphitrite palmata, Amphitrite radiata, Nereis cirrosa, Nereis cirrosa, Spio cirrata, Terebella cirrhata, Terebella montagui, Teredo arenaria
  - Amphitrite pauciseta Day, 1963, endemic
- Genus Artacama
  - Artacama proboscidea Malmgren, 1866
- Genus Eupolymnia
  - Eupolymnia nebulosa (Montagu, 1818), syn. Amphiro nebulosa, Amphitrite meckelii, Amphitritoides rapax, Pallonia rapax, Pista cristata occidentalis, Polymnia nebulosa, Terebella debilis, Terebella nebulosa, Terebella tuberculata
- Genus Hauchiella
  - Hauchiella tribullata (McIntosh, 1869), syn. Hauchiella peterseni, Polycirrus tribullata
- Genus Lanassa
  - Lanassa capensis Day 1955, endemic
- Genus Lanice
  - Lanice conchilega (Pallas, 1766), syn. Amphitrite flexuosa, Amphitrite tondi, Nereis conchilega, Terebella artifex, Terebella littoralis seu arenaria, Terebella pectoralis, Terebella prudens, Wartelia gonotheca
- Genus Loimia
  - Loimia medusa (Savigny in Lamarck, 1818), syn. Terebella medusa
- Genus Lysilla
  - Lysilla ubianensis Caullery, 1944
- Genus Nicolea
  - Nicolea venustula (Montagu, 1818), syn. Nicolea arctica, Nicolea viridis, Terebella parvula, Terebella venustula, Terebella vestita
  - Nicolea macrobranchia (Schmarda, 1861), syn. Terebella macrobranchia
- Genus Pista
  - Pista cristata (Müller, 1776), syn. Amphitrite cristata, Axionice cristata, Idalia vermiculus, Terebella turrita
  - Pista fasciata (Grube, 1870), syn. Dendrophora fasciata, Terebella (Phyzelia) fasciata
  - Pista foliigera Caullery, 1915
  - Pista quadrilobata Augener, 1918, syn. Nicolea quadrilobata
  - Pista unibranchia Day, 1963
- Genus Polycirrus
  - Polycirrus haematodes (Claparède, 1864), syn. Aphlebina haematodes, Apneumea leoncina
  - Polycirrus plumosus (Wollebaek, 1912), syn. Ereutho plumosa
  - Polycirrus tenuisetis Langerhans, 1881
- Genus Streblosoma
  - Streblosoma abranciata Day, 1963, endemic
  - Streblosoma chilensis (McIntosh, 1885), syn. Euthelepus chilensis
  - Streblosoma hesslei Day, 1955
  - Streblosoma persica (Fauvel, 1908), syn. Grymaea persica
- Genus Telothelepus
  - Telothelepus capensis Day, 1955
- Genus Terebella
  - Terebella pterochaeta (McIntosh, 1885), syn. Schmardanella pterochaeta
  - Terebella schmardai Linnaeus, 1767, syn. Leprea (Terebella) lapidaria
- Genus Terebellobranchia
  - Terebellobranchia natalensis Day 1951, endemic
- Genus Thelepus
  - Thelepus comatus (Grube, 1859), syn. Terebella comata, Thelepus natans
  - Thelepus pequenianus Augener, 1918
  - Thelepus plagiostoma (Schmarda, 1861), syn. Neottis rugosa Terebella heterobranchia, Terebella plagiostoma, Thelepus setosus
  - Thelepus triserialis (Grube, 1855), syn. Neottis triserialis, Terebella triserialis

=== Trichobranchidae ===
Family Trichobranchidae

- Genus Terebellides
  - Terebellides stroemii Sars, 1835, syn. Aponobranchus perrieri, Corephorus elegans, Terebella pecten, Terebellides carnea, Terebellides stroemi
- Genus Trichobranchus
  - Trichobranchus glacialis Malmgren, 1866, syn. Trichobranchus massiliensis

== Scolecida ==
Order Scolecida

=== Arenicolidae ===
Family Arenicolidae

- Genus Abarenicola
  - Abarenicola affinis Wells, 1963
  - Abarenicola gilchristi Wells, 1963
- Genus Arenicola
  - Arenicola loveni Kinberg, 1867, endemic
- Genus Branchiomaldane
  - Branchiomaldane vincenti Langerhans, 1881, syn. Clymenides incertus

=== Capitellidae ===
Family Capitellidae

- Genus Capitella
  - Capitella capitata (Fabricius, 1780), syn. Ancistria acuta, Capitella capitata belgica, Capitella capitata danica, Capitella capitata hebridarum, Capitella capitata neapolitana, Capitella capitata suchumica, Capitella fabricii, Capitella prototypa, Capitella similis, Lombricus canalium, Lumbriconais marina, Lumbricus capitatus, Lumbricus litoralis, Matla bengalensis, Saenuris barbata, Valla ciliata
- Genus Dasybranchus
  - Dasybranchus bipartitus (Schmarda, 1861), syn. Branchoscolex craspidochaetus, Branchoscolex oligobranchus, Branchoscolex sphaerochaetus, Oncoscolex bipartitus
  - Dasybranchus caducus (Grube, 1846), syn. Dasybranchus cirratus, Dasybranchus umbrinus, Dasymallus caducus, Notomastus roseus
- Genus Heteromastus
  - Heteromastus filiformis (Claparède, 1864), syn. Ancistria capillaris, Ancistria minima, Areniella filiformis, Capitella costana, Capitella filiformis, Capitella fimbriata, Notomastus filiformis, Notomastus laevis
- Genus Leiochrides
  - Leiochrides africanus Augener, 1918
- Genus Mediomastus
  - Mediomastus capensis Day, 1961
- Genus Notomastus
  - Notomastus aberans Day, 1957
  - Notomastus fauveli Day, 1955
  - Notomastus latericeus Sars, 1851, syn. Arenia cruenta, Arenia fragilis, Capitella rubicunda, Notomastus (Tremomastus) fertilis, Notomastus benedeni

=== Cossuridae ===
Family Cossuridae

- Genus Cossura
  - Cossura coasta Kitamori, 1960

=== Maldanidae ===
Family Maldanidae

- Genus Asychis
  - Asychis capensis Day, 1961, endemic
- Genus Axiothella
  - Axiothella quadrimaculata Augener, 1914, syn. Microclymene quadrimaculata
  - Axiothella jarli Kirkegaard, 1959
- Genus Euclymene
  - Euclymene glandularis (Day, 1955), syn. Clymene glandularis, endemic
  - Euclymene lombricoides (Quatrefages, 1866), syn. Axiothella zetlandica, Clymene brachysoma, Clymene lombricoides, Clymene modesta, Clymene zostericola
  - Euclymene luderitziana Augener, 1918
  - Euclymene lyrocephala (Schmarda, 1861), syn. Clymene lyrocephala
  - Euclymene natalensis (Day, 1957), syn. Clymene natalensis
  - Euclymene oerstedi (Claparède, 1863), syn. Caesicirrus neglectus, Clymene (Euclymene) oerstedii, Clymene claparedei, Clymene digitata, Clymene oerstedii, Leiocephalus coronatus
- Genus Johnstonia
  - Johnstonia knysna Day, 1955, endemic
- Genus Leiochone
  - Leiochone tenuis Day, 1957, syn. Clymenura tenuis
- Genus Lumbriclymene
  - Lumbriclymene cylindricauda Sars, 1872, syn. Lumbricus tubicola
  - Lumbriclymene minor Arwidsson, 1906
- Genus Macroclymene
  - Macroclymene saldanha (Day, 1955), syn. Clymene (Praxillella) saldanha, endemic
- Genus Maldane
  - Maldane sarsi Malmgren, 1865, syn. Clymene koreni, Maldane sarsi tropica
- Genus Maldanella
  - Maldanella capensis Day, 1961, endemic
  - Maldanella fibrillata Chamberlin, 1919
- Genus Nicomache
  - Nicomache lumbricalis (Fabricius, 1780), syn. Clymene lumbricalis Savigny, Clymene microcephala, Nicomache capensis, Nicomache carinata, Sabella lumbricalis
- Genus Praxillella
  - Praxillella affinis (M. Sars in G.O. Sars, 1872), syn. Clymene (Praxillella) affinis, Clymene affinis, Clymene lophoseta
  - Praxillella capensis (McIntosh, 1885), syn. Praxilla capensis
- Genus Petaloproctus
  - Petaloproctus terricolus Quatrefages, 1866, syn. Clymene spatulata, Maldane cristagalli, Nicomache mcintoshi, Petaloproctus terricola
- Genus Rhodine
  - Rhodine gracilior Tauber, 1879, syn. Rhodine loveni breviceps, Rhodine loveni gracilior

=== Opheliidae ===
Family Opheliidae

- Genus Armandia
  - Armandia intermedia Fauvel, 1902
  - Armandia leptocirris (Grube, 1878), syn. Armandia leptocirrus, Ophelina (Armandia) leptocirris
  - Armandia longicaudata (Caullery, 1944), syn. Ammotrypane longicaudata
- Genus Ophelia
  - Ophelia africana Tebble, 1953, endemic
  - Ophelia agulhana Day, 1961, endemic
  - Ophelia capensis Kirkegaard, 1959, endemic
  - Ophelia roscoffensis Augener, 1910, syn. Ophelia limacina roscoffensis
- Genus Ophelina
  - Ophelina acuminata Örsted, 1843, syn. Ammotrypane aulogaster, Ammotrypane ingebrigtsenii, Ophelia acuminata
- Genus Polyophthalmus
  - Polyophthalmus pictus (Dujardin, 1839), syn. Armandia robertianae, Nais picta, Polyophthalmus agilis, Polyophthalmus australis, Polyophthalmus ceylonensis, Polyophthalmus collaris, Polyophthalmus dubius, Polyophthalmus ehrenbergi, Polyophthalmus floridanus, Polyophthalmus incertus, Polyophthalmus longisetosus, Polyophthalmus pallidus, Polyophthalmus papillatus, Polyophthalmus pictus pontica, Polyophthalmus striatus
- Genus Travisia
  - Travisia concinna (Kinberg, 1866), syn. Dindymene concinna, endemic
  - Travisia forbesii Johnston, 1840, syn. Ammotrypane oestroides, Ophelia mamillata, Ophelia mamillata crassa, Travisia forbesi

=== Orbiniidae ===
Family Orbiniidae

- Genus Haploscoloplos
  - Haploscoloplos kerguelensis (McIntosh, 1885), syn. Scoloplos kerguelensis, Scoloplos mawsoni
- Genus Leitoscoloplos
  - Leitoscoloplos fragilis (Verrill, 1873), syn. Anthostoma fragile, Haploscoloplos fragilis, Scoloplos fragilis
- Genus Naineris
  - Naineris laevigata (Grube, 1855), syn. Aricia (Scoloplos) fuscibranchis, Aricia laevigata, Theodisca anserina, Theodisca liriostoma
- Genus Orbinia
  - Orbinia angrapequensis (Augener, 1918), syn. Aricia angrapequensis
  - Orbinia bioreti (Fauvel, 1919), syn. Aricia bioreti
  - Orbinia cuvierii (Audouin & Milne Edwards, 1833), syn. Aricia cuvieri perpapillata, Aricia cuvierii, Aricia sertulata, Orbinia cuvieri
  - Orbinia monroi Day, 1955
- Genus Phylo
  - Phylo capensis Day, 1961, endemic
  - Phylo foetida (Orlandi, 1896), syn. Aricia foetida ligustica, Aricia ligustica, Aricia ramosa
- Genus Scoloplos
  - Scoloplos armiger (Müller, 1776), syn. Scoloplos armiger
  - Scoloplos johnstonei (Day, 1934), syn. Scoloplos johnstonei, endemic
  - Scoloplos madagascariensis (Fauvel, 1919), syn. Scoloplos madagascarensis, Scoloplos madagascariensis
  - Scoloplos uniramus Day, 1961, endemic
- Genus Scolaricia
  - Scolaricia capensis Day, 1961, endemic
  - Scolaricia dubia (Day, 1955), syn. Orbinia dubia, Scoloplos (Scoloplos) dayi, endemic

=== Paraonidae ===
Family Paraonidae

- Genus Aedicira
  - Aedicira belgicae (Fauvel, 1936), syn. Aedicira belgicae
- Genus Aricidea
  - Aricidea capensis Day, 1961, syn. Aricidea capensis
  - Aricidea cerrutii Laubier, 1966, syn. Acmira cerrutii, Aricidea (Acesta) cerrutii, Aricidea (Aricidea) jeffreysii, Aricidea cerrutii, Aricidea jeffreysii, Aricidea jeffreysi
  - Aricidea curviseta Day, 1963, syn. Aricidea curviseta, endemic
  - Aricidea longobranchiata Day, 1961, syn. Aricidea (Aricidea) longobranchiata
  - Aricidea lopezi Berkeley & Berkeley, 1956, syn. Aricidea (Aricidea) fauveli, Aricidea fauveli, Aricidea lopezi
  - Aricidea simplex Day, 1963, syn. Acmira simplex, Aricidea simplex, Aricidea suecica simplex
- Genus Cirrophorus
  - Cirrophorus branchiatus Ehlers, 1908, syn. Cirrophorus lyriformis
- Genus Levinsenia
  - Levinsenia gracilis (Tauber, 1879), syn. Aonides gracilis, Paraonis filiformis, Paraonis gracilis, Paraonis ivanovi, Paraonis gracilis gracilis
  - Levinsenia oculata (Hartman, 1957), syn. Paraonis gracilis oculata
- Genus Paradoneis
  - Paradoneis lyra (Southern, 1914), syn. Cirrophorus lyra, Paraonis (Paraonides) lyra, Paraonis lyra, Paraonides lyra lyra
  - Paradoneis lyra (Day, 1955), syn. Paraonis (Paraonides) lyra capensis, Paraonides lyra capensis, endemic

=== Scalibregmatidae ===
Family Scalibregmatidae

- Genus Asclerocheilus
  - Asclerocheilus capensis Day, 1963, endemic
- Genus Hyboscolex
  - Hyboscolex longiseta Schmarda, 1861, syn. Lipobranchius capensis, Oncoscolex dicranochaetus, Oncoscolex homochaetus
- Genus Parasclerocheilus
  - Parasclerocheilus capensis Day, 1961
- Genus Polyphysia
  - Polyphysia crassa (Örsted, 1843), syn. Eumenia crassa, Eumenia ebranchiata, Eumeniopsis typica, Polyphysia quaterbranchia
- Genus Scalibregma
  - Scalibregma inflatum Rathke, 1843, syn. Eumenia crassa arctica, Oligobranchus groenlandicus, Oligobranchus roseus, Scalibregma abyssorum, Scalibregma brevicauda, Scalibregma inflatum corethrurum, Scalibregma minutum
