= Orbinia papillosa =

Scientific classification
- Kingdom: Animalia
- Phylum: Annelida
- Clade: Pleistoannelida
- Clade: Sedentaria
- Order: Orbiniida
- Family: Orbiniidae
- Genus: Orbinia
- Species: O. papillosa

Binomial name
- Orbinia papillosa (Ehlers, 1897)

Species of annelid worm

Orbinia papillosa is a polychaete worm distributed throughout New Zealand. Orbinia papillosa has a small pointed head without eyes. Adults can grow in size to more than 100mm long, but are less than 2mm in width.
