= Acanthopale perkinsi =

Scientific classification
- Kingdom: Animalia
- Phylum: Annelida
- Clade: Pleistoannelida
- Subclass: Errantia
- Order: Phyllodocida
- Family: Chrysopetalidae
- Genus: Acanthopale; San Martín, 1986
- Species: A. perkinsi

Binomial name
- Acanthopale perkinsi San Martín, 1986

Genus of annelid worms

Acanthopale is a genus of polychaetes belonging to the family Chrysopetalidae. The only species is Acanthopale perkinsi. The species is found in Central America.
