= Bhawania goodei =

Scientific classification
- Domain: Eukaryota
- Kingdom: Animalia
- Phylum: Annelida
- Clade: Pleistoannelida
- Subclass: Errantia
- Order: Phyllodocida
- Family: Chrysopetalidae
- Genus: Bhawania
- Species: B. goodei

Binomial name
- Bhawania goodei Webster, 1884

Synonyms
- Chrysopetalum elegans Bush in Verrill, 1900; Palmyra elongata Grube, 1856

Species of annelid

Bhawania goodei is a species of polychaete worms in the family Chrysopetalidae. It is found in tropical waters around the world. It was described from Bermuda.
