= Chrysopetalum =

Scientific classification
- Kingdom: Animalia
- Phylum: Annelida
- Clade: Pleistoannelida
- Subclass: Errantia
- Order: Phyllodocida
- Family: Chrysopetalidae
- Subfamily: Chrysopetalinae
- Genus: Chrysopetalum; Ehlers, 1864

Species
- several, including: Chrysopetalum ehlersi; Chrysopetalum occidentale

Genus of annelids

Chrysopetalum is a genus of polychaete worms.

== Genus description ==
Feet uniramose, furnished with only one tuft of setae. Headlobe with four or (?) two eyes, a tentacle, two antennae, and two palpi. The first segment of body provided with four cirri on each side; the succeeding segments with a cirrus on each side. Body nearly as broad as long. Branchiae placed on each segment, on each side of body, disposed in a fan-shaped row of flat setae or paleae. Paleae broad and rather short.

Chrysopetalum elegans is a synonym for Bhawania goodei.
