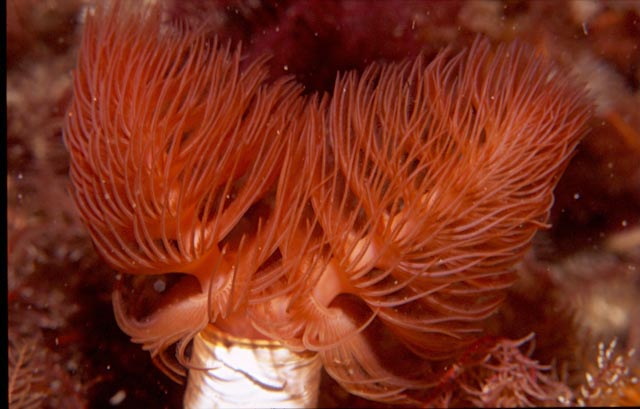
- Protula bispiralis

Scientific classification
- Kingdom: Animalia
- Phylum: Annelida
- Clade: Pleistoannelida
- Clade: Sedentaria
- Order: Sabellida
- Family: Serpulidae
- Genus: Protula; Risso, 1826

= Protula =

Genus of annelid worms

Protula is a genus of marine polychaete worms in the family Serpulidae.

== Subgenera ==
This genus has two subgenera:

- Protula (Hydroides)
- Protula (Protulopsis)

== Species ==
The following species are classified in this genus:

- Protula alba Benedict, 1887
- Protula alberti Fauvel, 1909
- Protula americana McIntosh, 1885
- Protula anomala Day, 1955
- Protula antennata Ehlers, 1887
- Protula apomatoides (Uchida, 1978)
- Protula atypha Bush, 1905
- Protula balboensis Monro, 1933
- Protula bispiralis (Savigny, 1822)
- Protula canavarii Roverto, 1899 †
- Protula diomedeae Benedict, 1887
- Protula extensa Solander in Brander, 1766
- Protula intestinum (Lamarck, 1818)
- Protula longiseta Schmarda, 1861
- Protula media Stimpson, 1854
- Protula pacifica Pixell, 1912
- Protula palliata (Willey, 1905)
- Protula planianica Ziegler, 1984 †
- Protula submedia Augener, 1906
- Protula superba Moore, 1909
- Protula tubularia (Montagu, 1803)
- Protula vincenti Rovereto, 1904
- Protula xeniolum Rovereto, 1904

== Synonyms ==
The following genera are synonyms of Protula:

- Ehlerprotula Uchida, 1978 (junior synonym)
- Lemintina Risso, 1826 (subjective synonym)
- Longitubus Howell, 1943 † (subjective synonym)
- Membranopsis Bush, 1910 (subjective synonym)
- Paraprotula Uchida, 1978 (junior synonym)
- Peotula Sun, 1998
- Protula (Philippiprotula) Uchida, 1978 (subgenus not recognized any longer)
- Protula (Protula) Risso, 1826 (subgenus not longer recognised)
- Protula (Psygmobranchus) Philippi, 1844 (subgenus not recognised any longer)
- Protulopsis Saint-Joseph, 1894 (synonym)
- Psygmobranchus Philippi, 1844 (junior synonym)
- Salmacinopsis Bush, 1910
- Serpula (Helena) Castelnau
- Serpula (Spiramella)
- Spiramella Blainville, 1828 (junior synonym)
