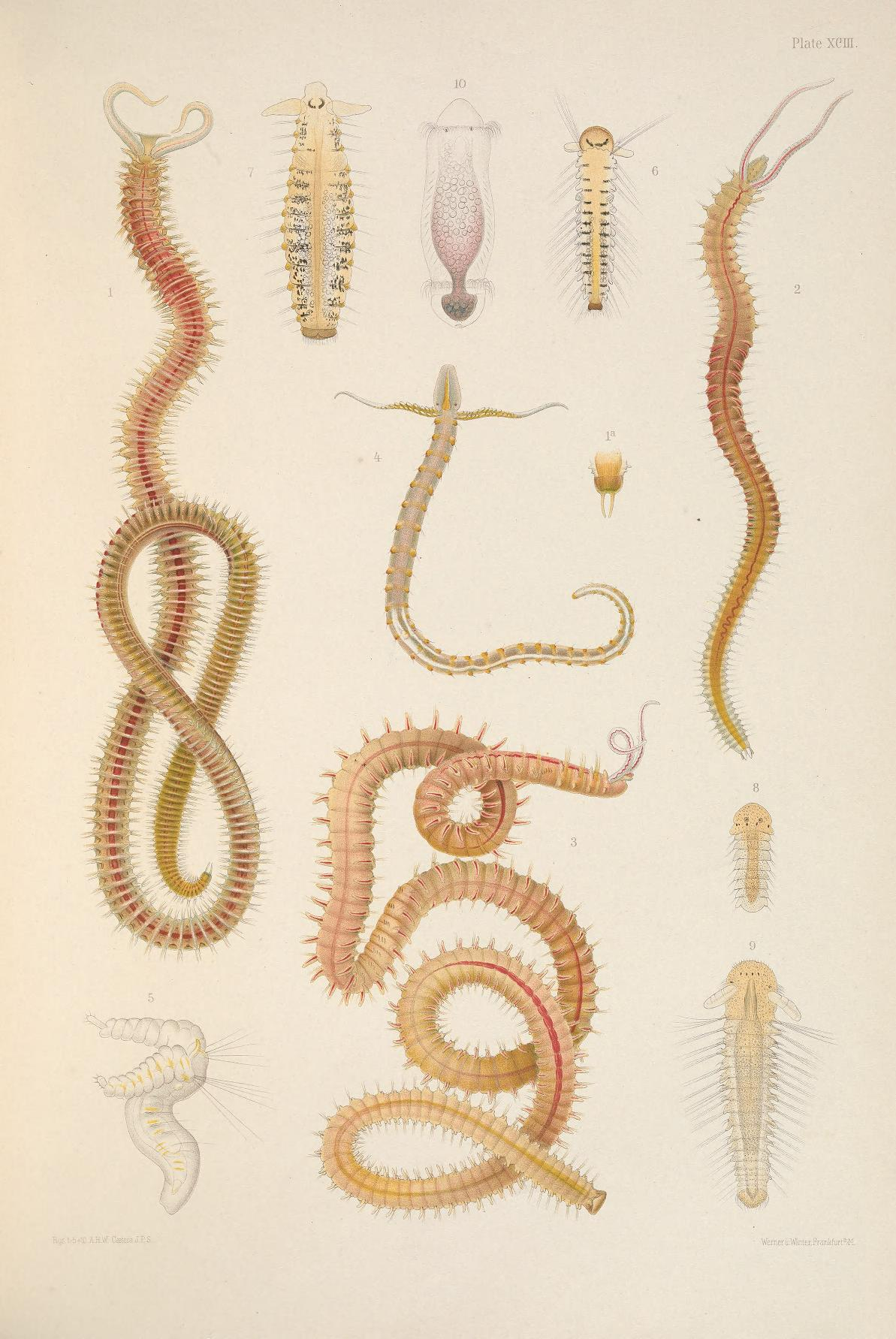
- illustration in "A monograph of the British marine annelids 1915 XCIII Plate" 2 Pygospio elegans Claparède, 1863

Scientific classification
- Kingdom: Animalia
- Phylum: Annelida
- Clade: Pleistoannelida
- Clade: Sedentaria
- Order: Spionida
- Family: Spionidae
- Genus: Pygospio; Claparède, 1863

Type species
- Pygospio elegans Claparède, 1863

Species
- Pygospio californica Hartman, 1936; Pygospio elegans Claparède, 1863; Pygospio muscularis Ward, 1981

= Pygospio =

Genus of annelids

Pygospio is a genus of marine polychaete worms in the family Spionidae.
