= Telothelepus =

Scientific classification
- Domain: Eukaryota
- Kingdom: Animalia
- Phylum: Annelida
- Clade: Pleistoannelida
- Clade: Sedentaria
- Order: Terebellida
- Family: Terebellidae
- Genus: Telothelepus; Day, 1955
- Species: T. capensis

Binomial name
- Telothelepus capensis Day, 1955

Genus of polychaete worms

Telothelepus is a monotypic genus of polychaete worms in the family Terebellidae, first described by John H. Day in 1955. The type taxon is Telothelepus capensis Day, 1955.

== Telothelepus capensis ==
Telothelepus capensis Day, 1955, is the type species of the monotypic genus Telothelepus.
