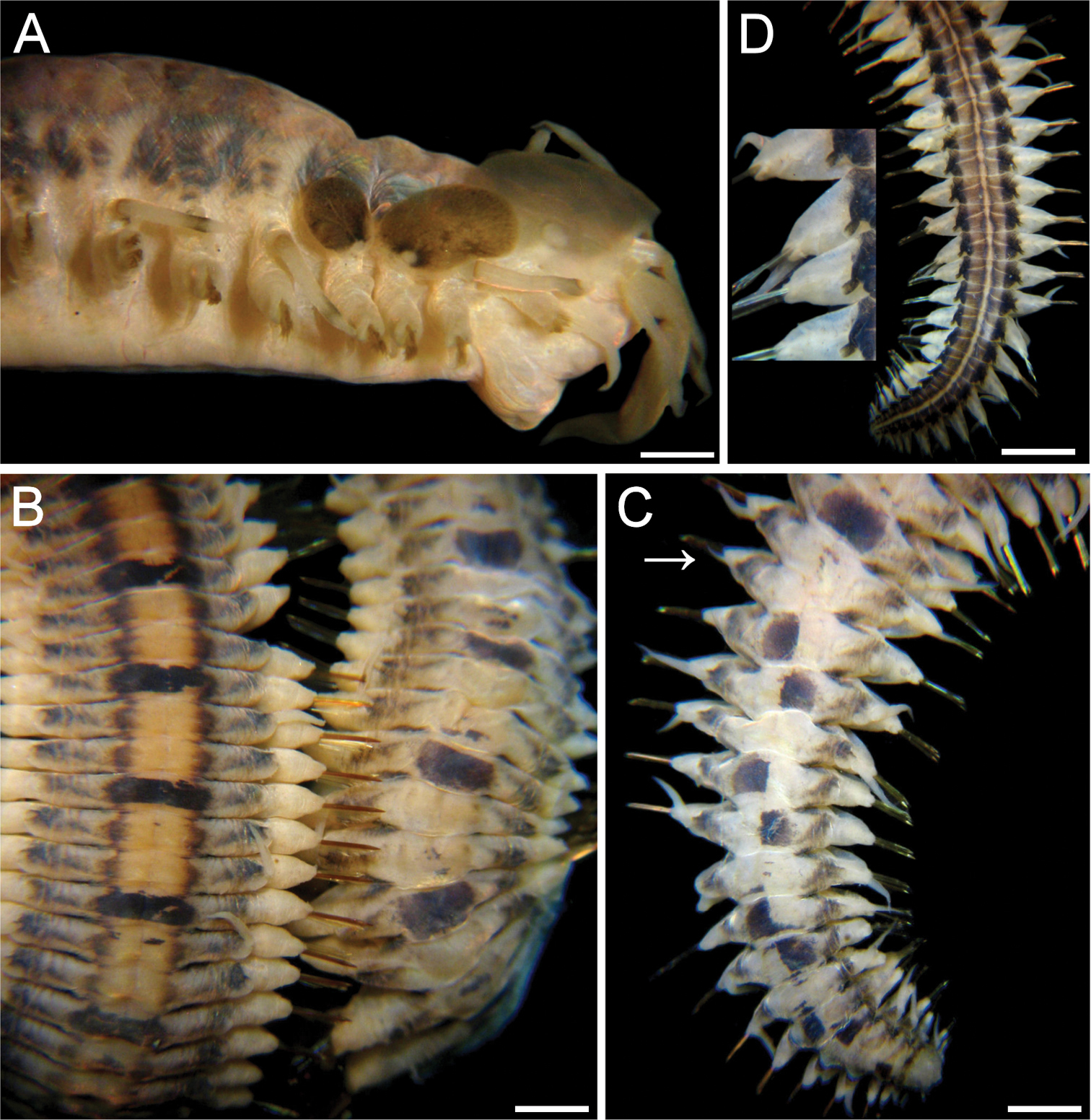
- Lepidasthenia loboi holotype

Scientific classification
- Kingdom: Animalia
- Phylum: Annelida
- Clade: Pleistoannelida
- Subclass: Errantia
- Order: Phyllodocida
- Family: Polynoidae
- Genus: Lepidasthenia; Malmgren, 1867

Type species
- Polynoe elegans Grube, 1840

= Lepidasthenia =

Genus of annelids

Lepidasthenia is a genus of marine Polychaete worms belonging to the family Polynoidae (scale worms). Species of Lepidasthenia are found worldwide to depths of about 1200 m but are more common in shallower water.

== Description ==
Lepidasthenia species are long-bodied scale worms with up to 150 segments and 50 to 100 or more pairs of elytra. The elytra are smooth and lack marginal papillae. Elytra are small, do not overlap, and leave the dorsal region of the body mostly uncovered; on the posterior region there is one pair of elytra every three segments. The lateral antennae are inserted terminally on the distal ends of the bilobed prostomium. The lateral and median antennae are smooth. The first segment is without chaetae. Notopodia are reduced and notochaetae are few or more often absent. The neuropodia are deeply divided vertically into anterior and posterior lobes. The neurochaetae may be bidentate or unidentate and are few.

== Biology ==
Lepidasthenia is one of many genera in the family that contain bioluminescent species.

== Species ==
There are 42 valid species of Lepidasthenia as of September 2020:

- Lepidasthenia alba (Treadwell, 1906)
- Lepidasthenia argus Hodgson, 1900
- Lepidasthenia australiensis (Augener, 1927)
- Lepidasthenia berkeleyae Pettibone, 1948
- Lepidasthenia brunnea Day, 1960
- Lepidasthenia curta Chamberlin, 1919
- Lepidasthenia elegans (Grube, 1840)
- Lepidasthenia esbelta Amaral & Nonato, 1982
- Lepidasthenia fallax (Grube, 1878)
- Lepidasthenia fauveli Rullier, 1964
- Lepidasthenia gigas (Johnson, 1897)
- Lepidasthenia grimaldii (Marenzeller, 1892)
- Lepidasthenia guadalcanalis Gibbs, 1971
- Lepidasthenia inquilinus (Treadwell, 1917)
- Lepidasthenia interrupta (Marenzeller, 1902)
- Lepidasthenia izukai Imajima & Hartman, 1964
- Lepidasthenia loboi Salazar-Vallejo, González & Salazar-Silva, 2015
- Lepidasthenia longicirrata Berkeley, 1923
- Lepidasthenia lucida (Treadwell, 1906)
- Lepidasthenia maculata Potts, 1910
- Lepidasthenia magnacornuta (Moore, 1903)
- Lepidasthenia medanensis Núñez, Brito & Ocaña, 1992
- Lepidasthenia michaelseni Augener, 1913
- Lepidasthenia microlepis Potts, 1910
- Lepidasthenia minikoensis Potts, 1910
- Lepidasthenia mossambica Day, 1962
- Lepidasthenia natans (Chamberlin, 1919)
- Lepidasthenia nuda (Quatrefages in Grube, 1870)
- Lepidasthenia ocellata (McIntosh, 1885)
- Lepidasthenia picta Treadwell, 1928
- Lepidasthenia platylepsis Knox, 1960
- Lepidasthenia retrodentata Monro, 1933
- Lepidasthenia rufa Treadwell, 1928
- Lepidasthenia scotti Buzhinskaya, 1982
- Lepidasthenia strelkovi Averincev & Uschakov, 1977
- Lepidasthenia stuardi Hartmann-Schröder, 1965
- Lepidasthenia stylolepis Willey in Lloyd, 1907
- Lepidasthenia terraereginae Monro, 1931
- Lepidasthenia varia Treadwell, 1917
- Lepidasthenia vesiculosa (Wesenberg-Lund, 1949)
- Lepidasthenia vietnamica Averincev & Uschakov, 1977
- Lepidasthenia virens (Blanchard in Gay, 1849)
