= Jasmineira =

Scientific classification
- Domain: Eukaryota
- Kingdom: Animalia
- Phylum: Annelida
- Clade: Pleistoannelida
- Clade: Sedentaria
- Order: Sabellida
- Family: Sabellidae
- Subfamily: Sabellinae
- Genus: Jasmineira; Langerhans, 1880

Species
- Jasmineira elegans; Jasmineira reayi

Genus of annelids

Jasmineira is a genus of polychaetes.
