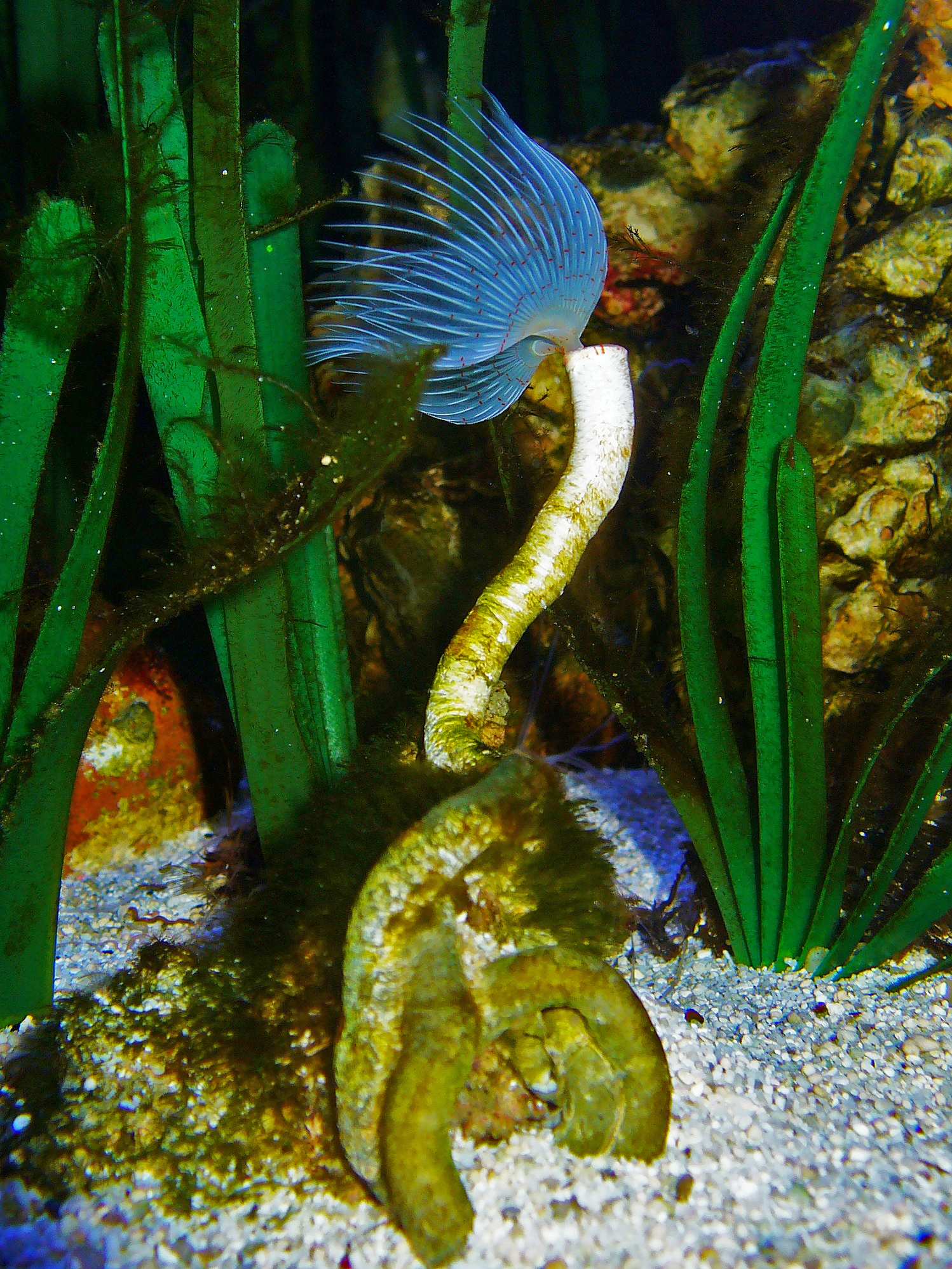

Scientific classification
- Domain: Eukaryota
- Kingdom: Animalia
- Phylum: Annelida
- Clade: Pleistoannelida
- Clade: Sedentaria
- Order: Sabellida
- Family: Serpulidae
- Genus: Protula
- Species: P. tubularia

Binomial name
- Protula tubularia Montagu, 1803

= Protula tubularia =

Species of polychate

Protula tubularia is a species of polychaete in the family Serpulidae.

== Habitat and distribution ==
This species is found in the waters of the Mediterranean Sea, the English Channel, the Atlantic Ocean and the North Sea (off the coasts of Norway, Great Britain and Ireland), but also along the coasts of South Africa and New Zealand.

== Subspecies ==
The World Register of Marine Species lists the following subspecies:

- Protula tubularia caeca Imajima, 1977
