= Gunnarea =

Scientific classification
- Kingdom: Animalia
- Phylum: Annelida
- Clade: Pleistoannelida
- Clade: Sedentaria
- Family: Sabellariidae
- Genus: Gunnarea; Johansson (1927)

Genus of polychaete worms

Gunnarea is a monotypic genus of polychaete worms in the family Sabellariidae, first described by Karl Eric Johansson, in 1927. The type taxon is Hermella capensis Schmarda, 1861 now accepted as syn. Gunnarea gaimardi (Quatrefages, 1848).

== Species ==
- Gunnarea capensis - Schmarda (1861)
- Gunnarea gaimardi - Quatrefages (1848)
