= Jasmineira elegans =

Scientific classification
- Kingdom: Animalia
- Phylum: Annelida
- Clade: Pleistoannelida
- Clade: Sedentaria
- Order: Sabellida
- Family: Sabellidae
- Genus: Jasmineira
- Species: J. elegans

Binomial name
- Jasmineira elegans Saint-Joseph, 1894

Species of annelid worm

Jasmineira elegans is a macrobenthic suspension feeder native to the coastal waters of the Northern Atlantic, Mediterranean Sea, and Red Sea. The worm is sessile and lives in sandy substrates where it utilizes suspension feeding in order to acquire nutrients.

== Anatomy ==
Jasmineira elegans is approximately 20 millimeters long and 1.5 millimeters wide, tapering at the posterior of its abdomen. Its slightly pink body is segmented. 8 segments compose the thorax and a variable number compose the abdomen. Along the first abdominal segment it has an anal groove. At the anterior end of its body the worm possesses a radiole crown composed of approximately a dozen radioles situated around its prostomium. Additionally, along the radiole crown are approximately 6 tentacular cirri.

== Distribution and behavior ==
Jasmineira elegans is a macrobenthic suspension feeder native to the Northern Atlantic Ocean, Mediterranean Sea, and Red Sea. The worm is sessile and lives in sandy substrates, predominantly in coastal waters. Jasmineira elegans uses its fan-like radioles to feed on suspended detritus and to supply itself with oxygen. Early observations of the worm suggest they may be capable of regenerating damaged radioles. Jasmineira elegans is dioecious with the females carrying light-brown eggs inside the first 12 segments of the abdomen.

== Environmental perturbations ==
Studies on macrobenthic assemblages in coastal regions of the Mediterranean Sea suggest that the Jasmineira elegans is more sensitive to organic pollution than other Polychaetes that occupy the same environment.

== Parasites ==
Jasmineira mackiei is a parasite that uses Jasmineira elegans and two other polychaetes in the same genus as hosts. Jasmineira mackiei is mesoparasitic and lives embedded within the abdomen of Jasmineira elegans with only an abdominal lobe containing its sexual organs protruding.
