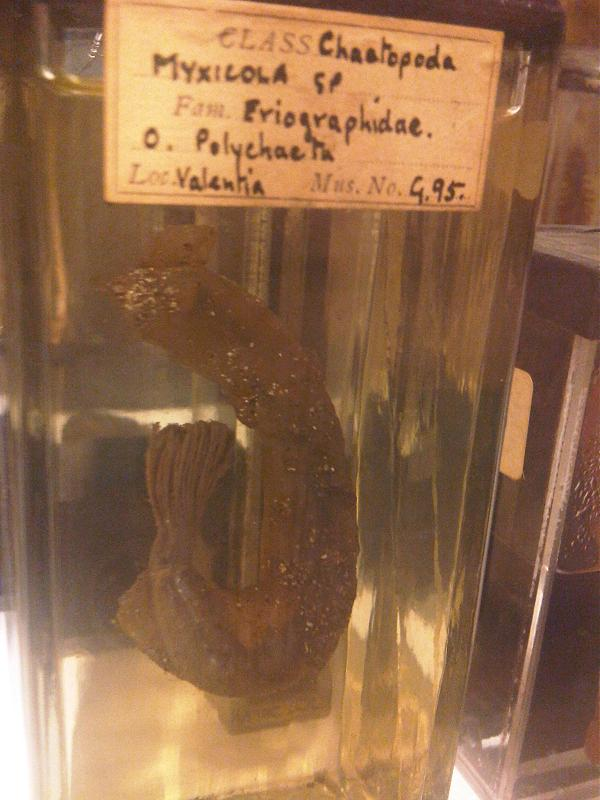
- Myxicola sp.

Scientific classification
- Kingdom: Animalia
- Phylum: Annelida
- Clade: Pleistoannelida
- Clade: Sedentaria
- Order: Sabellida
- Family: Sabellidae
- Subfamily: Myxicolinae
- Genus: Myxicola; Koch, 1847

= Myxicola =

Genus of annelid worms

Myxicola is a genus of polychaetes belonging to the family Sabellidae.

The genus has almost cosmopolitan distribution.

Species:

- Myxicola aesthetica (Claparède, 1870)
- Myxicola fauveli Potts, 1928
- Myxicola infundibulum (Montagu, 1808)
- Myxicola nana Capa & Murray, 2015
- Myxicola ommatophora Grube, 1878
- Myxicola sarsi Krøyer, 1856
- Myxicola sulcata Ehlers, 1912
- Myxicola violacea (Langerhans, 1884)
