= Orbinia =

Scientific classification
- Kingdom: Animalia
- Phylum: Annelida
- Clade: Pleistoannelida
- Clade: Sedentaria
- Order: Orbiniida
- Family: Orbiniidae
- Genus: Orbinia; Quatrefages, 1866

Genus of annelid worms

Orbinia is a genus of polychaetes belonging to the family Orbiniidae.

The genus has cosmopolitan distribution.

Species:

- Orbinia americana Day, 1973
- Orbinia angrapequensis (Augener, 1918)
- Orbinia armandi (McIntosh, 1910)
- Orbinia bioreti (Fauvel, 1919)
- Orbinia camposiensis Leão & Santos, 2016
- Orbinia cornidei (Rioja, 1934)
- Orbinia dicrochaeta Wu, 1962
- Orbinia edwardsi (McIntosh, 1910)
- Orbinia exarmata (Fauvel, 1932)
- Orbinia glebushki Averincev, 1990
- Orbinia hartmanae Day, 1977
- Orbinia johnsoni (Moore, 1909)
- Orbinia latreillii (Audouin & H Milne Edwards, 1833)
- Orbinia michaelseni
- Orbinia monroi Day, 1955
- Orbinia oligopapillata López, Cladera & San Martín, 2006
- Orbinia orensanzi Blake, 2017
- Orbinia papillosa (Ehlers, 1897)
- Orbinia riseri (Pettibone, 1957)
- Orbinia sagitta Leão & Santos, 2016
- Orbinia sertulata (Savigny, 1822)
- Orbinia sertulata (Savigny, 1822)
- Orbinia swani Pettibone, 1957
- Orbinia vietnamensis Gallardo, 1968
- Orbinia wui Sun & Li, 2018
