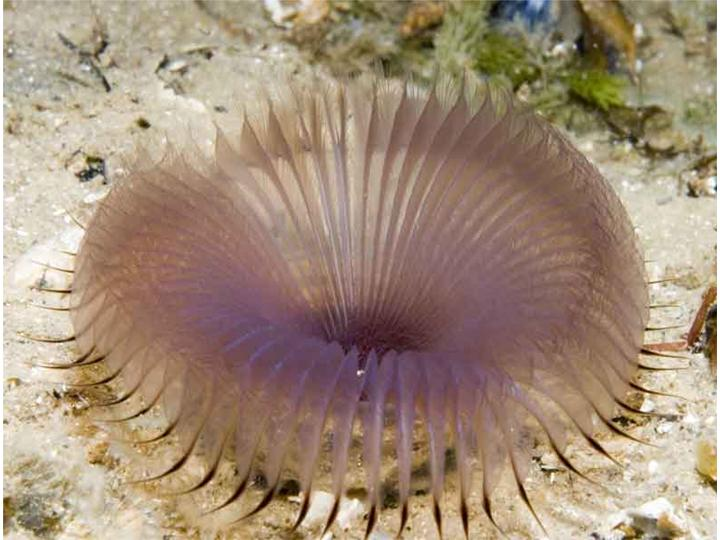

Scientific classification
- Domain: Eukaryota
- Kingdom: Animalia
- Phylum: Annelida
- Clade: Pleistoannelida
- Clade: Sedentaria
- Order: Sabellida
- Family: Sabellidae
- Genus: Myxicola
- Species: M. infundibulum

Binomial name
- Myxicola infundibulum (Montagu, 1808)

= Myxicola infundibulum =

Species of annelid

Myxicola infundibulum is a species of polychaete worm from the family Sabellidae. The body consists of a head, a cylindrical, segmented body and a tail piece. The head consists of a Prostomium (part of the mouth) and a peristomium (area around the mouth) and carries paired appendages (palps, antennae and cirri).
