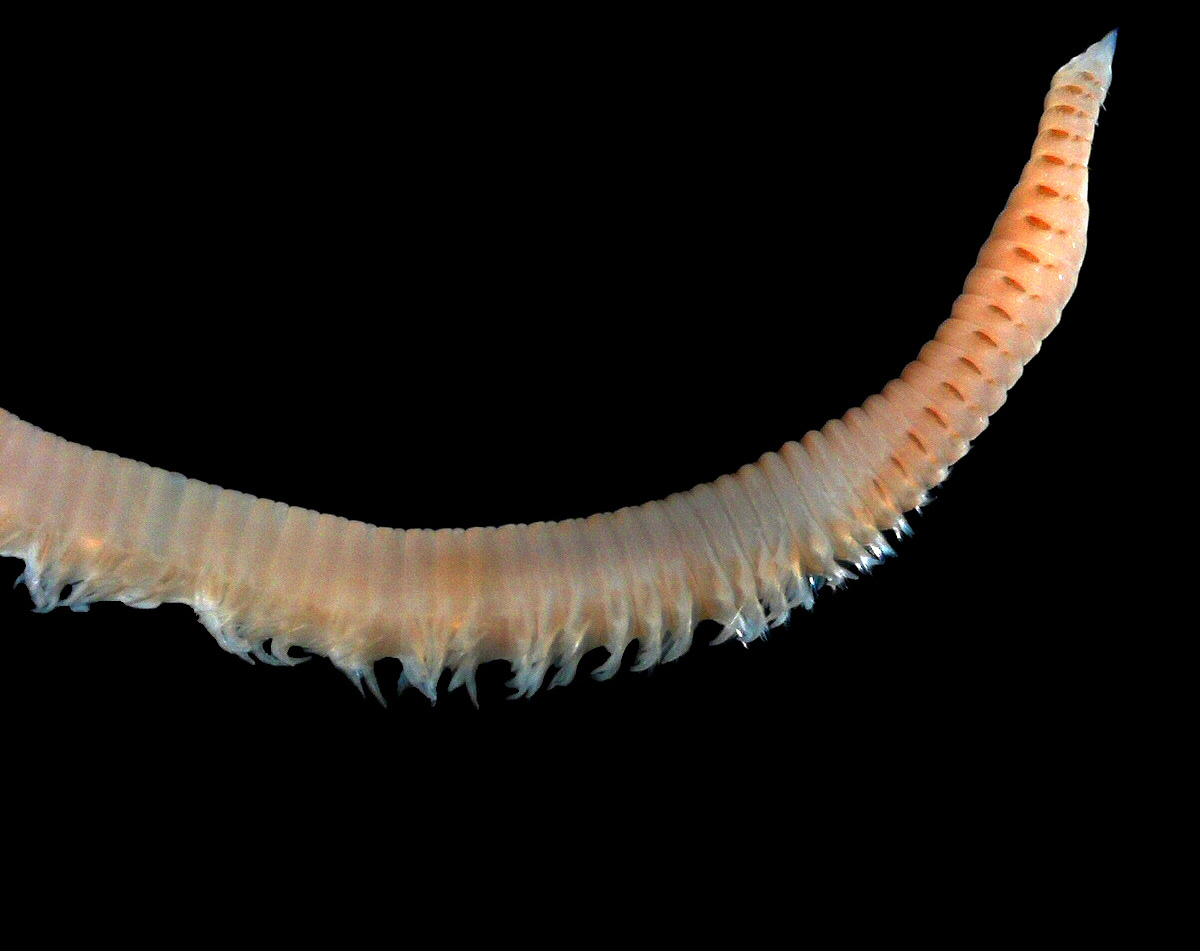
- Scoloplos armiger

Scientific classification
- Kingdom: Animalia
- Phylum: Annelida
- Clade: Pleistoannelida
- Clade: Sedentaria
- Order: Orbiniida
- Family: Orbiniidae
- Genus: Scoloplos; Blainville, 1828

= Scoloplos =

Genus of annelids

Scoloplos is a genus of annelids belonging to the family Orbiniidae.

The genus has cosmopolitan distribution.

The 69 species listed by IRMNG include:

- Scoloplos acmeceps Chamberlin, 1919
- Scoloplos acutissimus Hartmann-Schröder, 1991
- Scoloplos armiger (Müller, 1776)
