= Lepidasthenia elegans =

Scientific classification
- Domain: Eukaryota
- Kingdom: Animalia
- Phylum: Annelida
- Clade: Pleistoannelida
- Subclass: Errantia
- Order: Phyllodocida
- Family: Polynoidae
- Genus: Lepidasthenia
- Species: L. elegans

Binomial name
- Lepidasthenia elegans (Grube, 1840)

Synonyms
- Lepidasthenia affinis Horst, 1917; Polynoe blainvillei Audouin & Milne Edwards, 1834; Polynoe elegans Grube, 1840; Polynoe lamprophthalma Marenzeller, 1874

Species of annelid

Lepidasthenia elegans is a species of scaled Polychaete worms in the family Polynoidae. It is found in the Mediterranean Sea.
