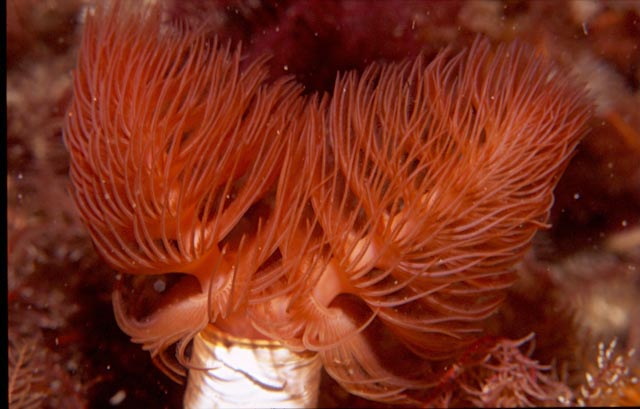

Scientific classification
- Kingdom: Animalia
- Phylum: Annelida
- Clade: Pleistoannelida
- Clade: Sedentaria
- Order: Sabellida
- Family: Serpulidae
- Genus: Protula
- Species: P. bispiralis

Binomial name
- Protula bispiralis (Savigny, 1822)

= Protula bispiralis =

Species of annelid worm

Protula bispiralis, commonly known as the red fanworm or as a mopworm, is a species of marine polychaete worm in the family Serpulidae.

== Description ==
Red fanworms have bodies which grow to 65mm in a tube of up to 10mm in diameter. They are lovely fanworms, having a white shell-like tube and two bright orange-red spirals of feathery branches protruding from it.

== Distribution ==
These animals are found off the southern African coast from Cape Point to Durban, subtidally and to at least 25m.

== Ecology ==
These animals grow under boulders or crevices, and are often seen on vertical rock faces. They use their feeding crowns to catch microplankton.

== Synonyms ==
The following species are synonyms of Protula bispiralis:

- Protula (Philippiprotula) magnifica Straughan, 1967 (subjective synonym)
- Protula magnifica Straughan, 1967 (subjective synonym)
- Serpula (Spiramella) bispiralis Savigny, 1822 (objective synonym)
- Serpula bispiralis Savigny, 1822 (objective synonym)
- Spiramella bispiralis (Savigny, 1822) (objective synonym)
