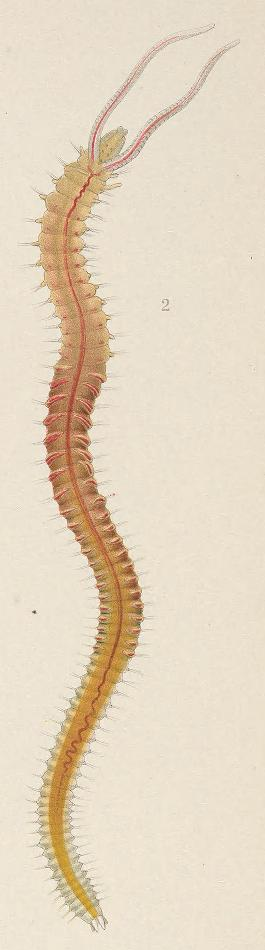
- Pygospio elegans Claparède, 1863. A monograph of the British marine annelids, 1915, plate XCIII

Scientific classification
- Kingdom: Animalia
- Phylum: Annelida
- Clade: Pleistoannelida
- Clade: Sedentaria
- Order: Spionida
- Family: Spionidae
- Genus: Pygospio
- Species: P. elegans

Binomial name
- Pygospio elegans Claparède, 1863

= Pygospio elegans =

Species of annelid

Pygospio elegans is a species of marine polychaete worms in the family Spionidae. It is found in Western Europe (France, Belgium, and The Netherlands).
