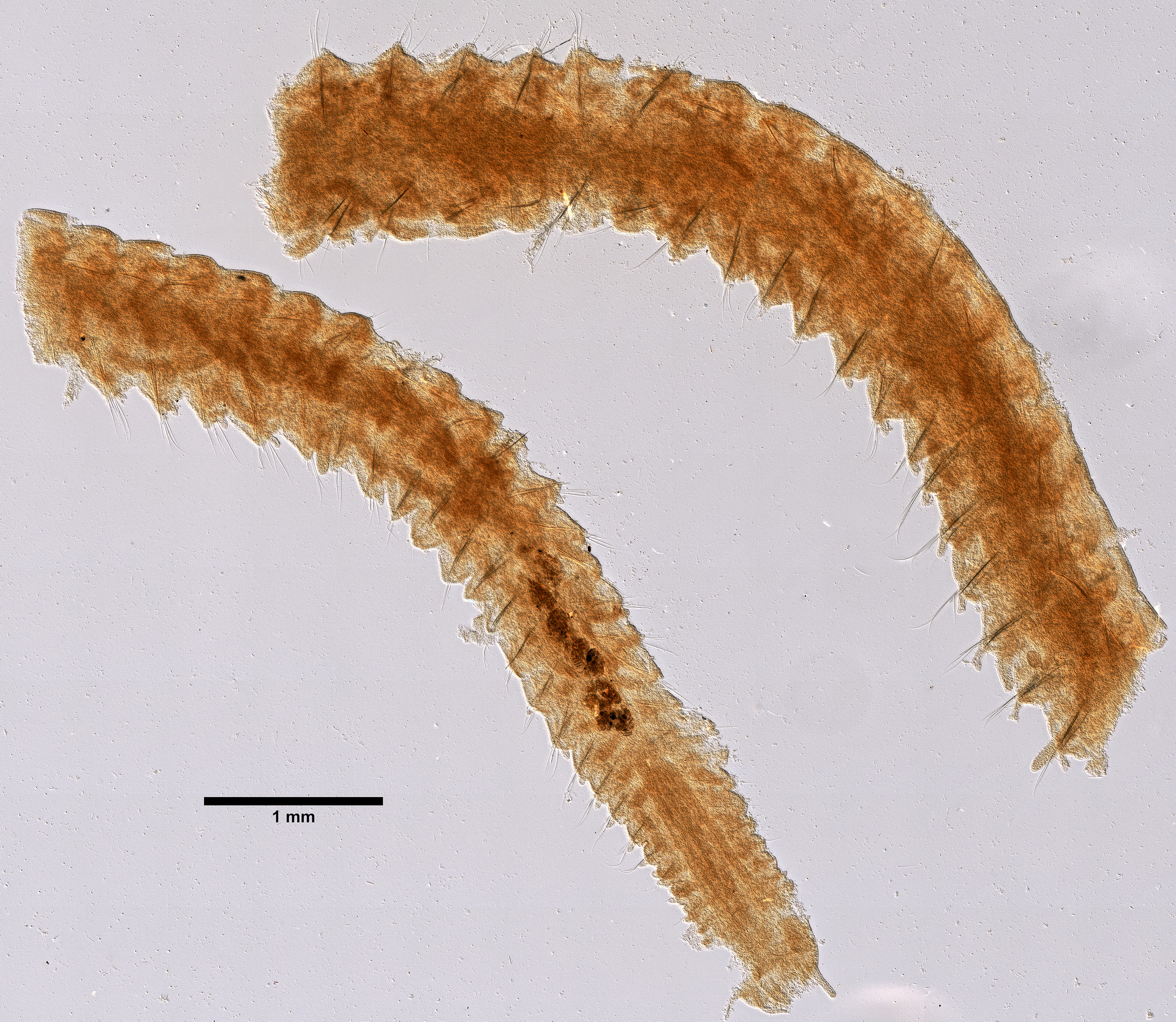
- Naineris quadricuspida

Scientific classification
- Kingdom: Animalia
- Phylum: Annelida
- Clade: Pleistoannelida
- Clade: Sedentaria
- Order: Orbiniida
- Family: Orbiniidae
- Genus: Naineris; Blainville, 1828

Synonyms
- Naidonereis Agassiz, 1846; Naidoneris Webster & Benedict, 1887; Nainereis Grube, 1850

= Naineris =

Genus of annelid worms

Naineris is a genus of polychaete annelids belonging to the family Orbiniidae. It was first described by Henri Marie Ducrotay de Blainville in 1828. The type species is Nais quadricuspida Fabricius, 1780, currently accepted as Naineris quadricuspida (Fabricius, 1780). The genus has cosmopolitan distribution.

Species found in Australia according to the Australian Faunal directory are:

- Naineris australis Hartman, 1957
- Naineris grubei (Gravier, 1908)
- Naineris laevigata (Grube, 1855)
- Naineris victoriae Day, 1977

IRMNG lists 23 species including that shown in the image and those above (with the exception of N. argentiniensis).

== Species ==
Accepted species as of October 2023 are:

- Naineris antarctica Blake, 2017
- Naineris argentiniensis Blake, 2017
- Naineris aurantiaca (Müller, 1858)
- Naineris australis Hartman, 1957
- Naineris bicornis Hartman, 1951
- Naineris chilensis Hartmann-Schröder, 1965
- Naineris dendritica (Kinberg, 1867)
- Naineris furcillata Blake, 2017
- Naineris grubei (Gravier, 1908)
- Naineris jacutica Annenkova, 1931
- Naineris japonica Imajima, 2009
- Naineris kalkudaensis (De Silva, 1965)
- Naineris laevigata (Grube, 1855)
- Naineris mutilata Treadwell, 1931
- Naineris quadraticeps Day, 1965
- Naineris quadricuspida (Fabricius, 1780)
- Naineris retusiceps Chamberlin, 1919
- Naineris setosa (Verrill, 1900)
- Naineris uncinata Hartman, 1957
- Naineris victoriae Day, 1977
