= Phylo (annelid) =

Scientific classification
- Kingdom: Animalia
- Phylum: Annelida
- Clade: Pleistoannelida
- Clade: Sedentaria
- Order: Orbiniida
- Family: Orbiniidae
- Genus: Phylo; Kinberg, 1866

Genus of annelids

Phylo is a genus of polychaetes belonging to the family Orbiniidae.

The genus has cosmopolitan distribution.

Species:

- Phylo capensis Day, 1961
- Phylo felix Kinberg, 1866
- Phylo fimbriata (Moore, 1903)
- Phylo foetida (Claparède, 1868)
- Phylo grubei (McIntosh, 1910)
- Phylo kubbarensis Mohammad, 1980
- Phylo kupfferi (Ehlers, 1874)
- Phylo kuwaitica Mohammad, 1970
- Phylo norvegicus (M.Sars, 1872)
- Phylo novazealandiae Day, 1977
- Phylo nudus (Moore, 1911)
- Phylo ornatus (Verrill, 1873)
- Phylo paraornatus Blake, 2021
