= Bhawania =

Scientific classification
- Kingdom: Animalia
- Phylum: Annelida
- Clade: Pleistoannelida
- Subclass: Errantia
- Order: Phyllodocida
- Family: Chrysopetalidae
- Subfamily: Chrysopetalinae
- Genus: Bhawania; Schmarda, 1861

Species
- Bhawania goodei; Bhawania heteroseta; Bhawania myrialepis

Genus of annelids

Bhawania is a genus of polychaete worms in the family Chrysopetalidae.
