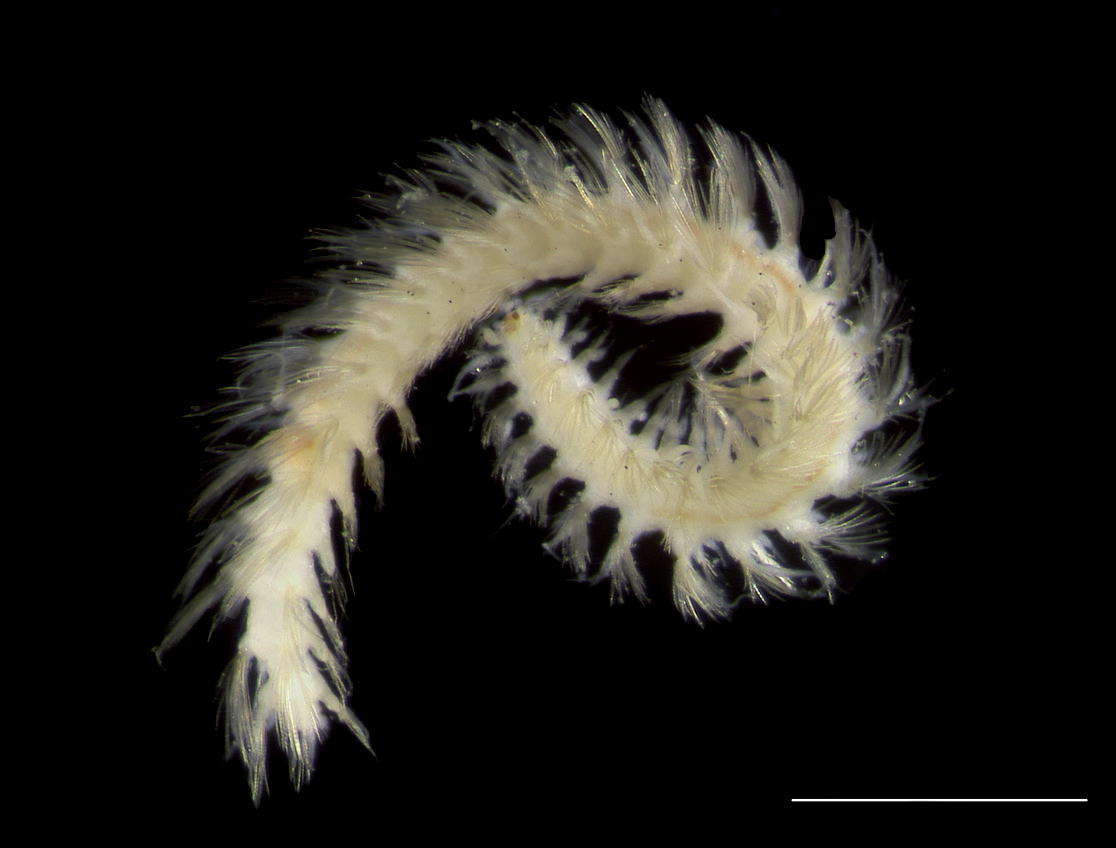
- Dysponetus joeli

Scientific classification
- Kingdom: Animalia
- Phylum: Annelida
- Clade: Pleistoannelida
- Subclass: Errantia
- Order: Phyllodocida
- Suborder: Nereidiformia
- Family: Chrysopetalidae; Ehlers, 1864

Genera
- See text

= Chrysopetalidae =

Family of annelids

Chrysopetalidae is a family of polychaete worms. The body is short or elongated, with few or numerous segments. All segments bear on their dorsal side a fan or a transverse row of paleae. The cephalic lobe has tentacles and eyes and the buccal segment has two or four tentacular cirri on each side. The parapodia are uniramous or biramous, with dorsal cirri upon all segments. The ventral bristles are compound.

== Genera ==
The following genera are recognised:

Subfamily Calamyzinae Hartmann-Schröder, 1971

- Boudemos Watson, Carvajal, Sergeeva, Pleijel & Rouse, 2016
- Calamyzas Arwidsson, 1932
- Craseoschema Ravara & Aguado in Ravara et al., 2019
- Flascarpia Blake, 1993
- Iheyomytilidicola Miura & Hashimoto, 1996
- Laubierus Blake, 1993
- Micospina Watson, Carvajal, Sergeeva, Pleijel & Rouse, 2016
- Miura Blake, 1993
- Mytilidiphila Miura & Hashimoto, 1993
- Natsushima Miura & Laubier, 1990
- Nautiliniella Miura & Laubier, 1990
- Petrecca Blake, 1990
- Santelma Blake, 1993
- Shinkai Miura & Laubier, 1990
- Spathochaeta Jimi, Moritaki & Kajihara, 2019
- Thyasiridicola Miura & Hashimoto, 1996
- Vesicomyicola Dreyer, Miura & Van Dover, 2004
- Victoriella Kiseleva, 1996

Subfamily Chrysopetalinae Ehlers, 1864

- Bhawania Schmarda, 1861
- Chrysopetalum Ehlers, 1864
- Hyalopale Perkins, 1985
- Paleaequor Watson Russell, 1986
- Paleanotus Schmarda, 1861
- Pseudodysponetus Böggemann, 2009
- Strepternos Watson Russell, 1991
- Thrausmatos Watson, 2001
- Treptopale Perkins, 1985

Subfamily Dysponetinae Aguado, Nygren & Rouse, 2013

- Dysponetus Levinsen, 1879

No subfamily:

- Acanthopale San Martín, 1986
- Arichlidon Watson Russell, 1986
