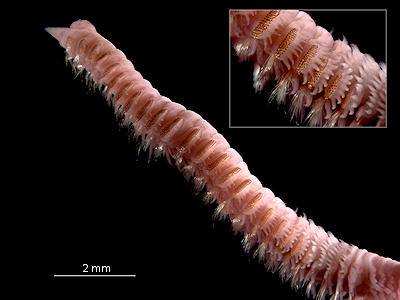
- Orbinia sertulata

Scientific classification
- Kingdom: Animalia
- Phylum: Annelida
- Clade: Pleistoannelida
- Clade: Sedentaria
- Order: Orbiniida
- Family: Orbiniidae; Hartman, 1942

Genera
- See text

Synonyms
- Questidae

= Orbiniidae =

Family of annelids

Orbiniidae is a family of polychaete worms. Orbiniids are mostly unselective deposit feeders on marine detritus. They can be found from the neritic zone to abyssal depths.

The family was revised in 1957 by Olga Hartman and some further revisions were made by Blake in 2000.

== Genera ==
- Alcandra
- Aricia Savigny, 1820
- Berkeleyia
- Branchethus
- Califia
- Clytie
- Falklandiella
- Labotas
- Lacydes
- Leitoscoloplos Day, 1977
- Leodamas
- Microrbinia Hartman, 1965
- Naidonereis
- Nainereis Blainville, 1828
- Naineris Blainville, 1828
- Orbinella
- Orbinia Quatrefages, 1865
- Orbiniella Day, 1954
- Paraorbiniella Rullier, 1974
- Pararicia
- Pettibonella
- Phylo Kinberg, 1865
- Phylodamas
- Porcia
- Proscoloplos
- Protoaricia Czerniavsky, 1881
- Protoariciella Hartmann-Schroder, 1962
- Schroederella Laubier, 1962
- Scolaricia
- Scoloplella Day, 1963
- Scoloplos Blainville, 1828
- Scoloplosia
- Theodisca
- Uncorbinia
- Uschakovius Laubier, 1973
