= Pistha =

Pistha may refer to:

- Pistha (1997 film), an Indian Tamil-language comedy film by K. S. Ravikumar
- Thoranai, or Pistha, a 2009 Indian action drama film by Sabha Ayyappan
- Pistha (2022 film), an Indian Tamil-language drama film

== See also ==
- Pista, a genus of annelid worms
- Pistachio, pista in Indian English
