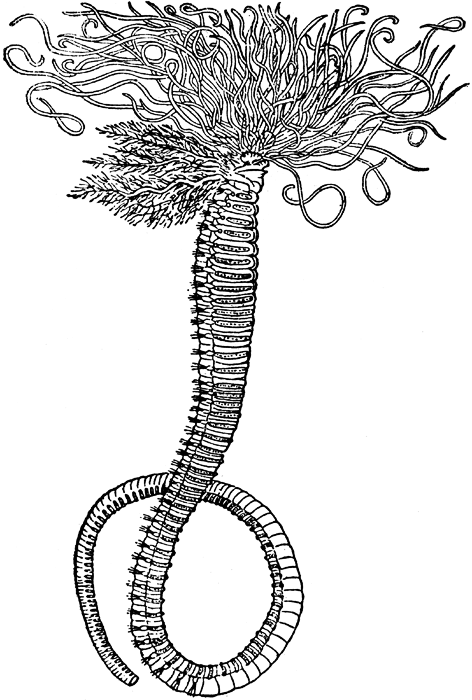

Scientific classification
- Kingdom: Animalia
- Phylum: Annelida
- Clade: Pleistoannelida
- Clade: Sedentaria
- Order: Terebellida
- Family: Terebellidae
- Genus: Amphitrite
- Species: A. ornata

Binomial name
- Amphitrite ornata (Leidy, 1855)

Synonyms
- Neoamphitrite ornata (Leidy, 1855); Terebella ornata Leidy, 1855

= Amphitrite ornata =

Species of annelid worm

Amphitrite ornata or ornate worm, is a species of marine polychaete worm in the family Terebellidae.

Polychaetes, or marine bristle worms, have elongated bodies divided into many segments. Each segment may bear setae (bristles) and parapodia (paddle-like appendages). Some species live freely, either swimming, crawling or burrowing, and these are known as "errant". Others live permanently in tubes, either calcareous or parchment-like, and these are known as "sedentary".

== Distribution ==
This species is found in Cobscook Bay, the Gulf of Maine and the north west Atlantic Ocean at a depth of up to 200 metres.

== Description ==
The ornate worm can grow to up to forty centimetres long and lives in a firm, sand-encrusted tube. All that is visible are the three bright red bushy gills and a spread of long, peach-coloured tentacles above them. The tentacles can extend to forty centimetres and are constantly in motion, searching for food particles. The rest of the worm's segmented, tapering body remains concealed in the tube.

== Biology ==
This worm lives in a tough U-shaped tube in the mud substrate. The sexes are separate and the females can be distinguished by their darker abdominal segments. Spawning takes place in June to August, peaking in July, especially around the periods of new and full moon and the subsequent increase in tidal flows. The eggs and sperm develop and float freely in the body cavity of the worm but by some little understood process, only the ripe products are released. The eggs are fertilized externally and the rate of development of the larvae is rapid. Swimming forms are present four to five hours after fertilization, and well-formed trochophores within 20 hours. Larval segmentation begins at 36 hours and metamorphosis starts at about the fifth day, when five trunk segments are already present. At this stage, the larvae cease to swim about freely and sink to the sea floor. Metamorphosis is complete by the eleventh day.

== Ecology ==
This worm is often found associated with the fringe worm, Cirratulus cirriformia, in the littoral and sublittoral zones, in soft mud and under stones. The tiny pea crab Pinnixa chaetopterana is sometimes found living as a commensal inside the tube behind the worm.

The ornate worm is often found in marine environments also inhabited by Notomastus lobatus (Polychaeta) and Saccoglossus kowalewskyi (Hemichordata), which produce and contaminate sediments with bromophenols and bromopyrroles. These organic halogen metabolites are toxic and it has been found that A. ornata produces a novel dehaloperoxidase that detoxifies haloaromatic compounds. The genes responsible have been identified.
