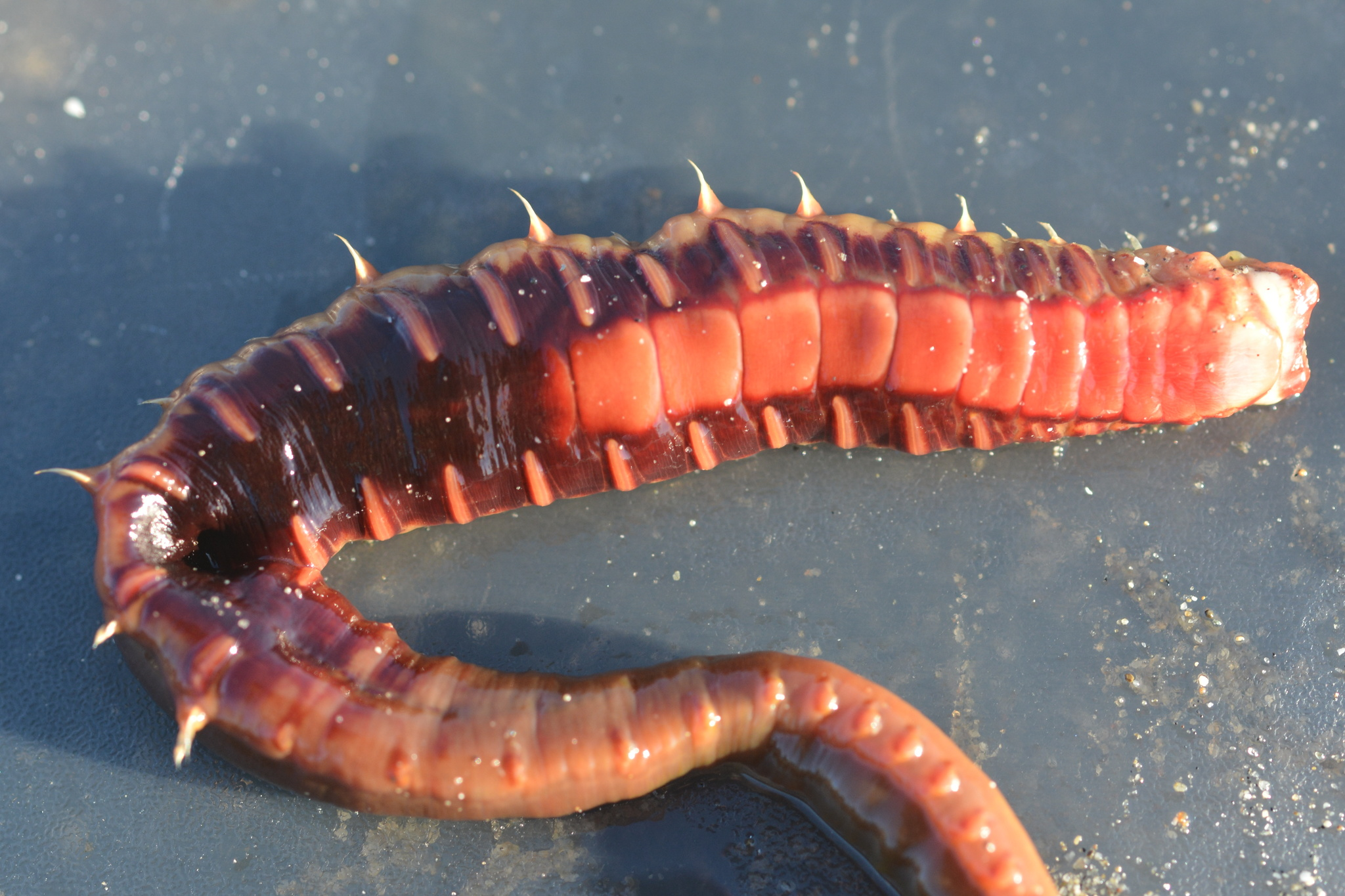
- Anterior portion of the body of Pista pacifica
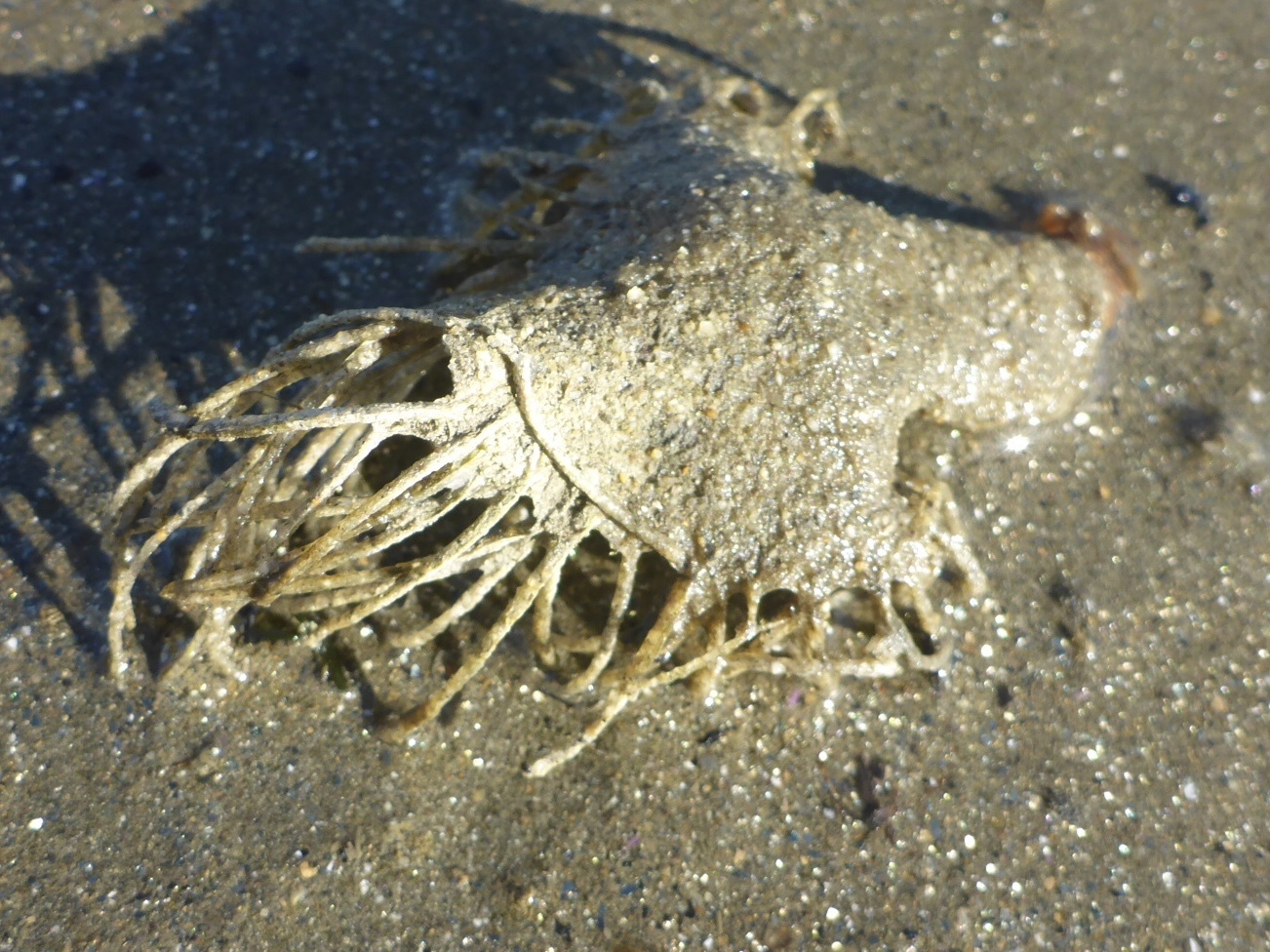
- Entrance to the burrow of Pista pacifica

Scientific classification
- Kingdom: Animalia
- Phylum: Annelida
- Clade: Pleistoannelida
- Clade: Sedentaria
- Order: Terebellida
- Family: Terebellidae
- Genus: Pista
- Species: P. pacifica

Binomial name
- Pista pacifica Berkeley & Berkeley, 1942

= Pista pacifica =

Species of worm

Pista pacifica is a species of polychaete worm in the family Terebellidae native to the coastal regions of the northeastern Pacific Ocean, from British Columbia to Southern California. It creates vertical tubes in intertidal mud or sand that can be more than two feet deep. The tubes extend above the substrate, terminating in overhangs bearing many marginal tendrils. The worms themselves can grow up to 37 cm long, and, like all members of the family Terebellidae, they are particle feeders that use their tentacles to forage for organic detritus around their burrows. The scale worm Halosydna brevisetosa may reside commensally in their tubes.
