= Worm =

Limbless invertebrate animal

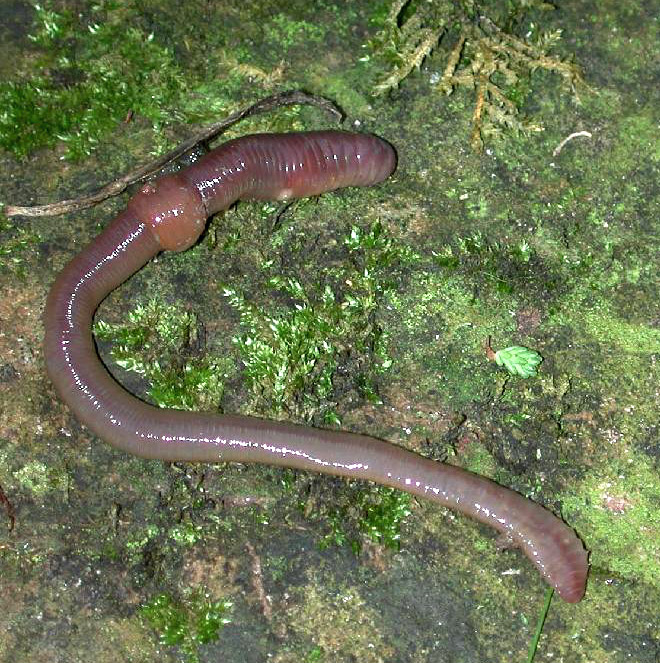
Lumbricus terrestris, an earthworm

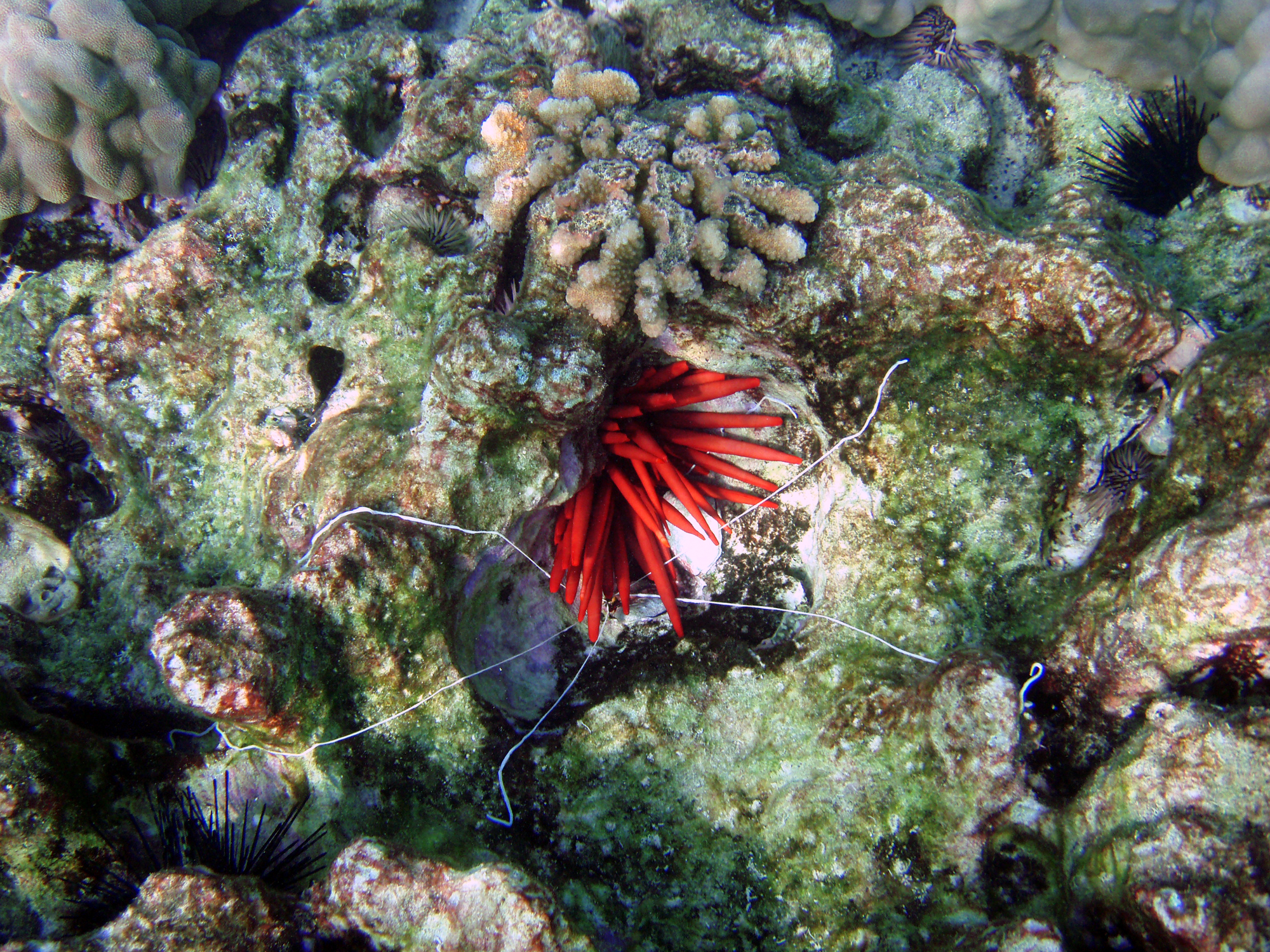
White tentacles of Loimia medusa, a spaghetti worm

Worms are many different distantly related bilateral animals that typically have a long cylindrical tube-like body, no limbs, and usually no eyes.

Worms vary in size from microscopic to over 1 metre (3.3 ft) in length for marine polychaete worms (bristle worms); 6.7 metres (22 ft) for the African giant earthworm, Microchaetus rappi; and 58 metres (190 ft) for the marine nemertean worm (bootlace worm), Lineus longissimus. Various types of worm occupy a small variety of parasitic niches, living inside the bodies of other animals. Free-living worm species do not live on land but instead live in marine or freshwater environments or underground by burrowing.

In biology, "worm" refers to an obsolete taxon, Vermes, used by Carolus Linnaeus and Jean-Baptiste Lamarck for all non-arthropod invertebrate animals, now seen to be paraphyletic. The name stems from the Old English word wyrm. Most animals called "worms" are invertebrates, but the term is also used for the amphibian caecilians and the slowworm Anguis, a legless burrowing lizard. Invertebrate animals commonly called "worms" include annelids, nematodes, flatworms, nemertea, chaetognaths, priapulids, and insect larvae such as grubs and maggots.

The term "helminth" is sometimes used to refer to parasitic worms. The term is more commonly used in medicine, and usually refers to roundworms and tapeworms.

== History ==
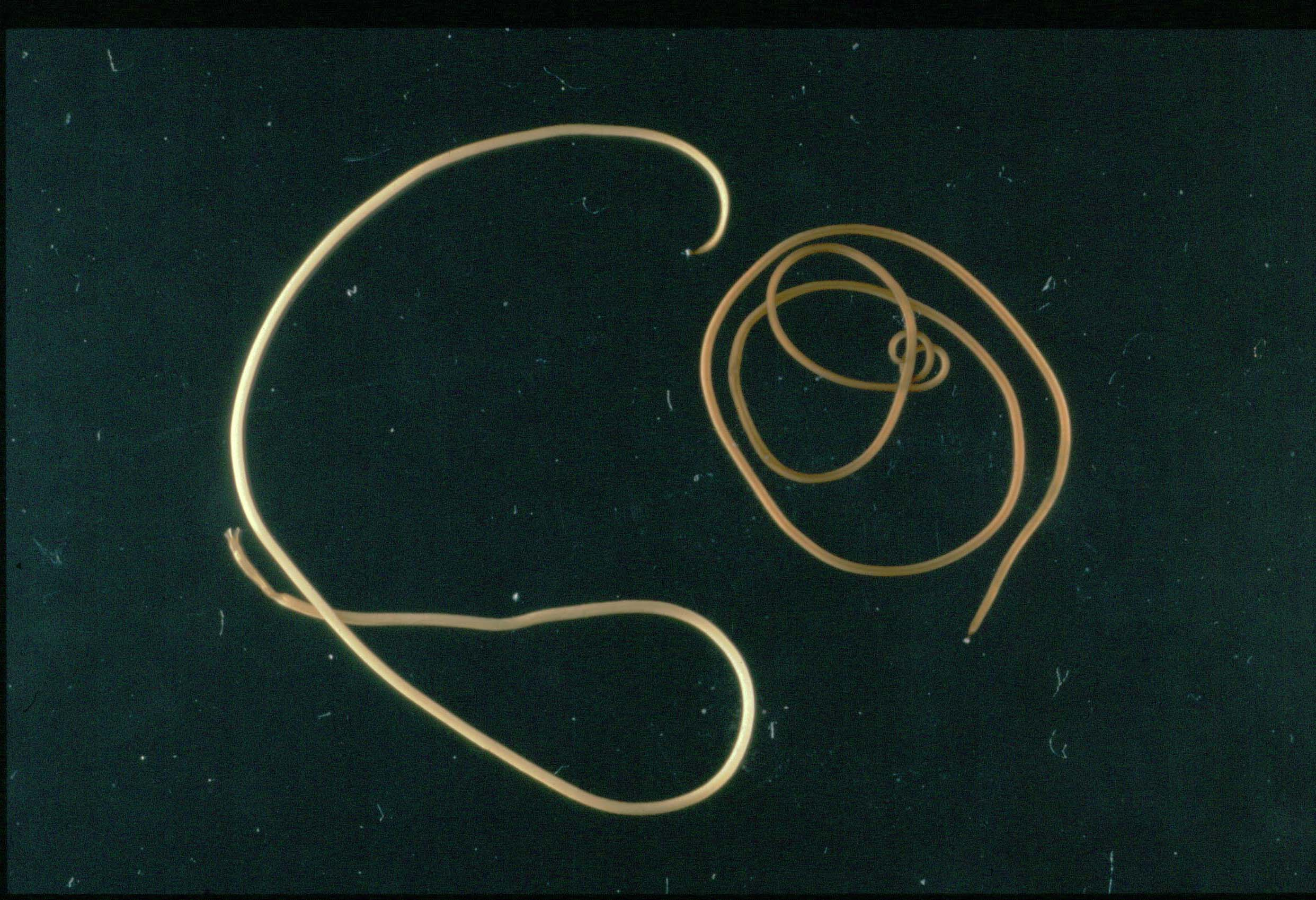
Paragordius tricuspidatus, a nematomorphan

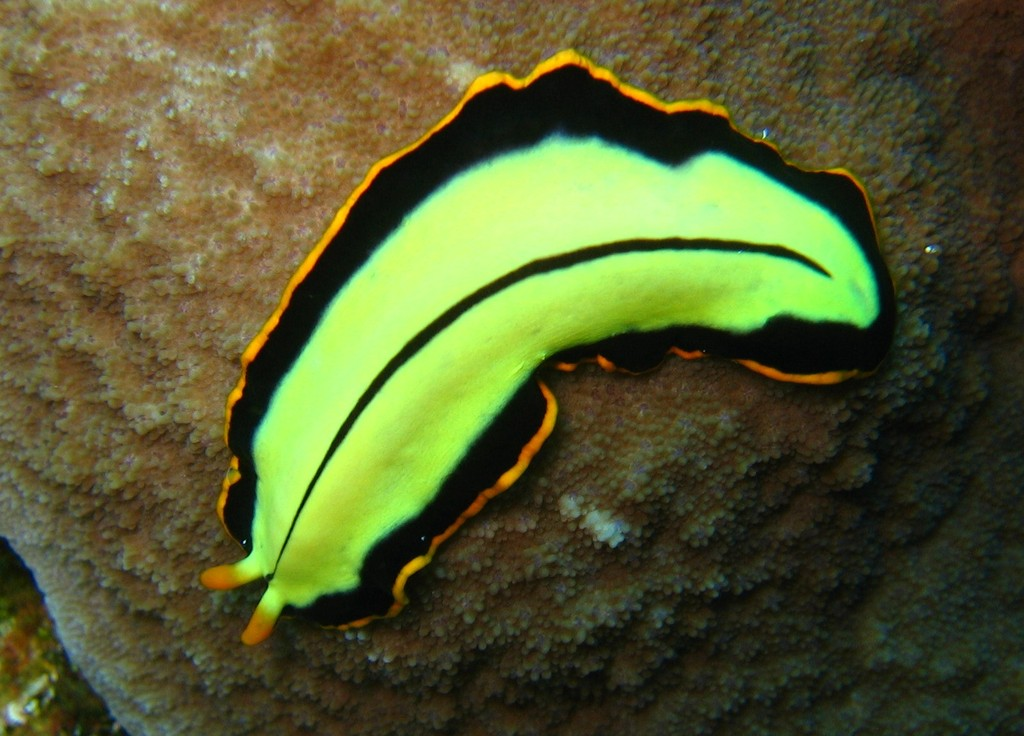
Pseudoceros dimidiatus, a flatworm

In taxonomy, "worm" refers to an obsolete grouping, Vermes, used by Carl Linnaeus and Jean-Baptiste Lamarck for all non-arthropod invertebrate animals, now seen to be polyphyletic. In 1758, Linnaeus created the first hierarchical classification in his Systema Naturae. In his original scheme, the animals were one of three kingdoms, divided into the classes of Vermes, Insecta, Pisces, Amphibia, Aves, and Mammalia. Since then the last four have all been subsumed into a single phylum, the Chordata, while his Insecta (which included the crustaceans and arachnids) and Vermes have been renamed or broken up. The process was begun in 1793 by Lamarck, who called the Vermes une espèce de chaos (a sort of chaos) (Note: The prefix une espèce de is pejorative.) and split the group into three new phyla, worms, echinoderms, and polyps (which contained corals and jellyfish). By 1809, in his Philosophie Zoologique, Lamarck had created 9 phyla apart from vertebrates (where he still had 4 phyla: mammals, birds, reptiles, and fish) and molluscs, namely cirripedes, annelids, crustaceans, arachnids, insects, worms, radiates, polyps, and infusorians.

== Informal grouping ==
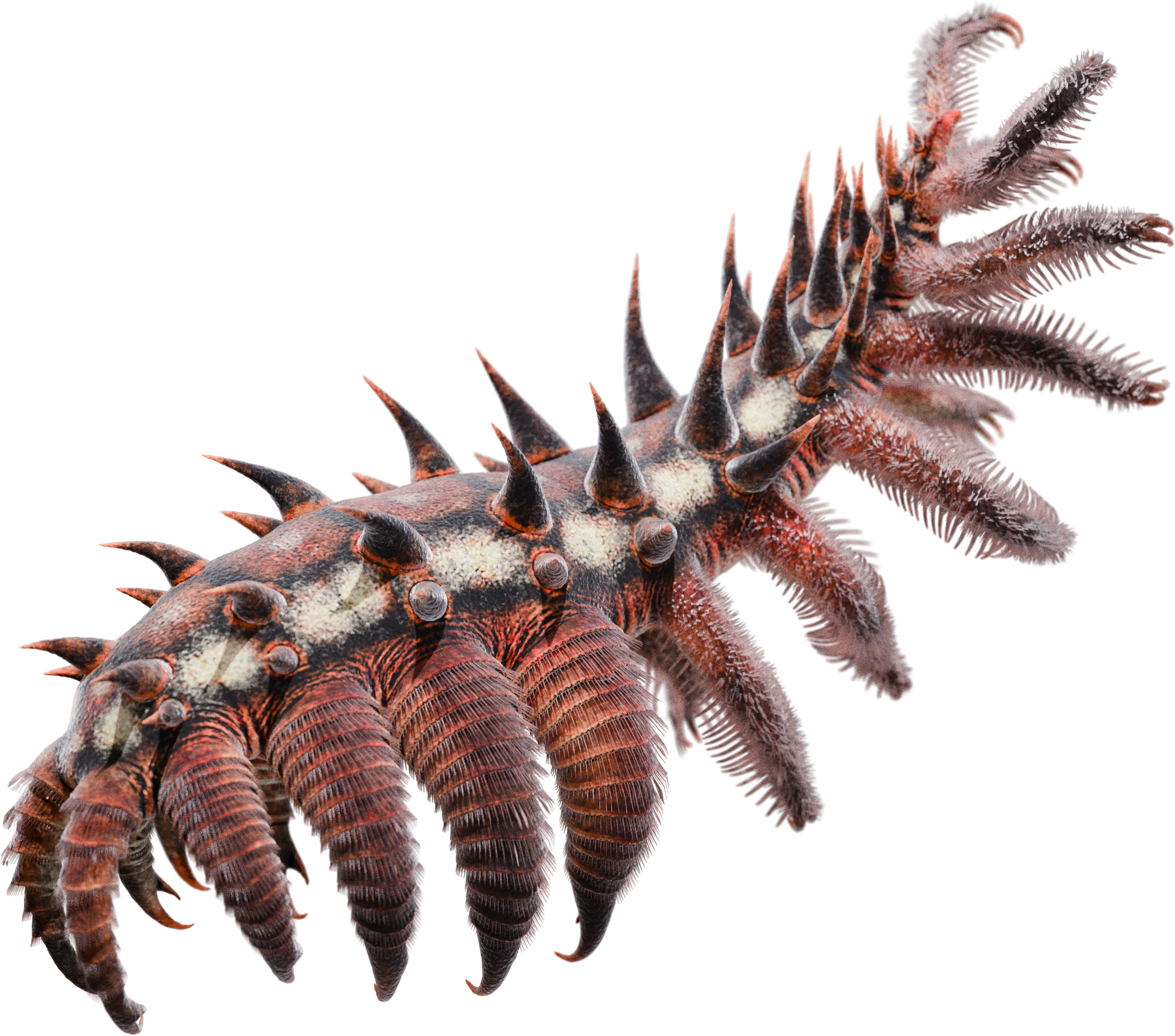
Reconstruction of Entothyreos, a luolishaniid lobopodian

In the 13th century, worms were recognized in Europe as part of the category of reptiles that consisted of a miscellany of egg-laying creatures, including "snakes, various fantastic monsters, lizards, assorted amphibians", as recorded by Vincent of Beauvais in his Mirror of Nature. In everyday language, the term worm is also applied to various other living forms such as larvae, insects, millipedes, centipedes, shipworms (teredo worms), or even some vertebrates (creatures with a backbone) such as blindworms and caecilians. Worms include several groups. The three main phyla are:

- Platyhelminthes, includes the flatworms, tapeworms, and flukes. They have a flat, ribbon- or leaf-shaped body with a pair of eyes at the front. Some are parasites.
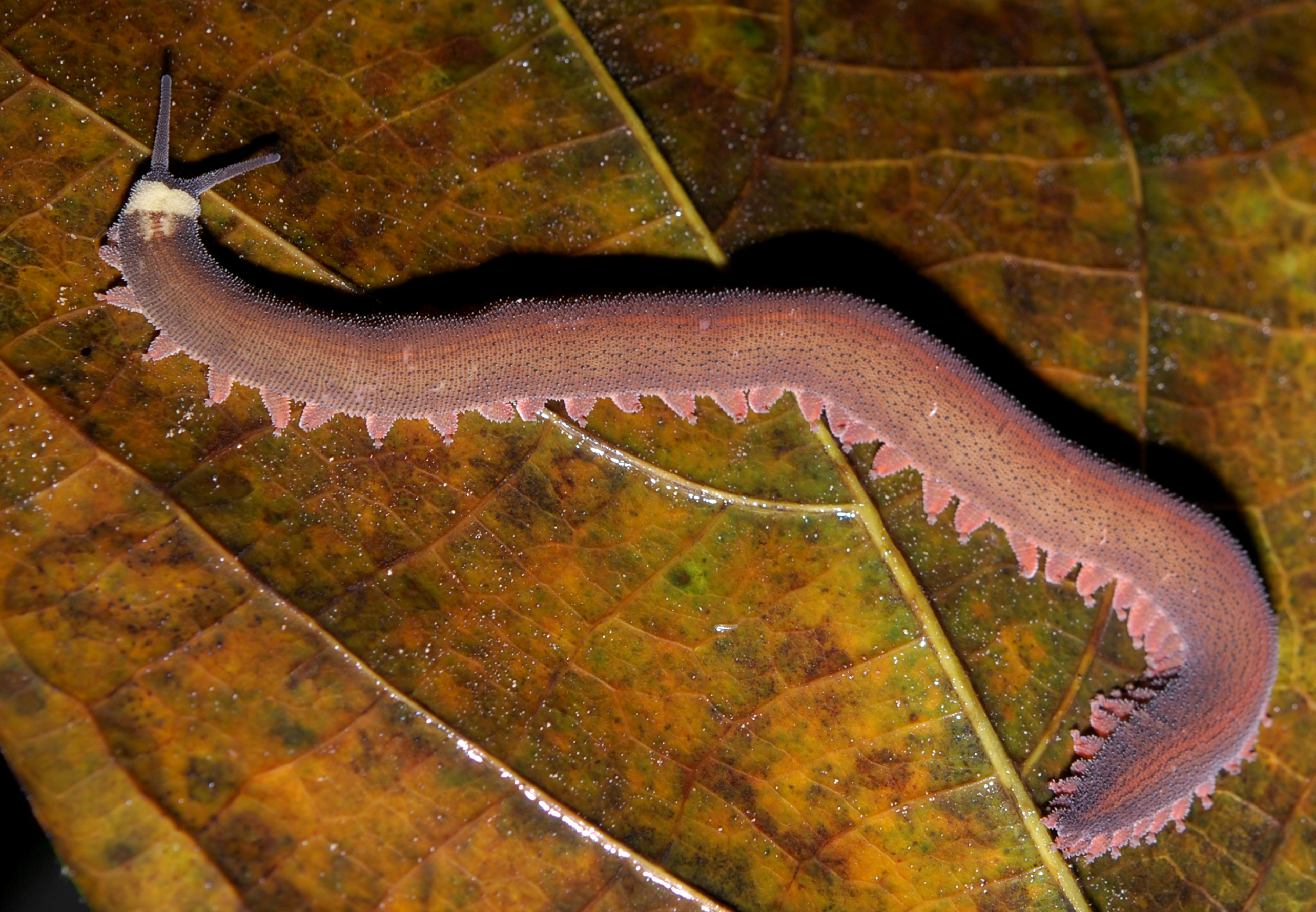
- A species of Oroperipatus, a velvet worm
  Nematoda, contains the threadworms, hookworms and other roundworms. Threadworms may be microscopic, such as the vinegar eelworm, or more than 1-metre (3 feet) long. They are found in damp earth, moss, decaying substances, fresh water, or salt water. Some roundworms are also parasites: the Guinea worm, for example, gets under the skin of the feet and legs of people living in tropical countries.
- Annelida, consists of the segmented worms, with bodies divided into segments or rings. Among these worms are the earthworms and the bristle worms of the sea.

Familiar worms include the earthworms, members of phylum Annelida. Other invertebrate groups may be called worms, especially colloquially. In particular, many unrelated insect larvae are called "worms", such as the railroad worm, woodworm, glowworm, bloodworm, butterworm, inchworm, mealworm, silkworm, and woolly bear worm.

Worms may also be called helminths, particularly in medical terminology when referring to parasitic worms, especially the Nematoda (roundworms) and Cestoda (tapeworms). Hence, "helminthology" is the study of parasitic worms. When a human or an animal, such as a dog or horse, is said to "have worms", it means that it is infested with parasitic worms, typically roundworms or tapeworms. Deworming is a method to kill off the worms that have infected a human or animal by giving anthelmintic drugs.

"Ringworm" is not a worm, but rather a skin condition caused by fungi.

Lobopodians are an informal grouping of extinct panarthropods from the Cambrian to the Carboniferous that are often called worms or "worm-like animals" despite having had legs in the form of stubby lobopods. Likewise, the extant Onychophora are sometimes called velvet worms despite possessing stubby legs.

== Society and culture ==
Wyrm was the Old English term for carnivorous reptiles ("serpents") and mythical dragons. "Worm" has also been used as a pejorative epithet to describe a cowardly, weak or pitiable person.

Worms can also be farmed for the production of nutrient-rich vermicompost.

== See also ==
- Helminthology
- Nematology
- Sea worm, lists various types of marine worms
- Worm cast
- Worm charming
- Vermeology
