= Lanassa =

Lanassa was the name of some ancient noble women:

- Lanassa (mythology), the mythical ancestress of the royal dynasty of the Molossians in Epirus
- Lanassa (wife of Pyrrhus), a daughter of king Agathocles of Syracuse, wife of king Pyrrhus of Epirus and later of the diadoch Demetrius I of Macedon

Lanassa may also refer to:

- Lanassa (annelid), a genus of polychaetes in the family Terebellidae
