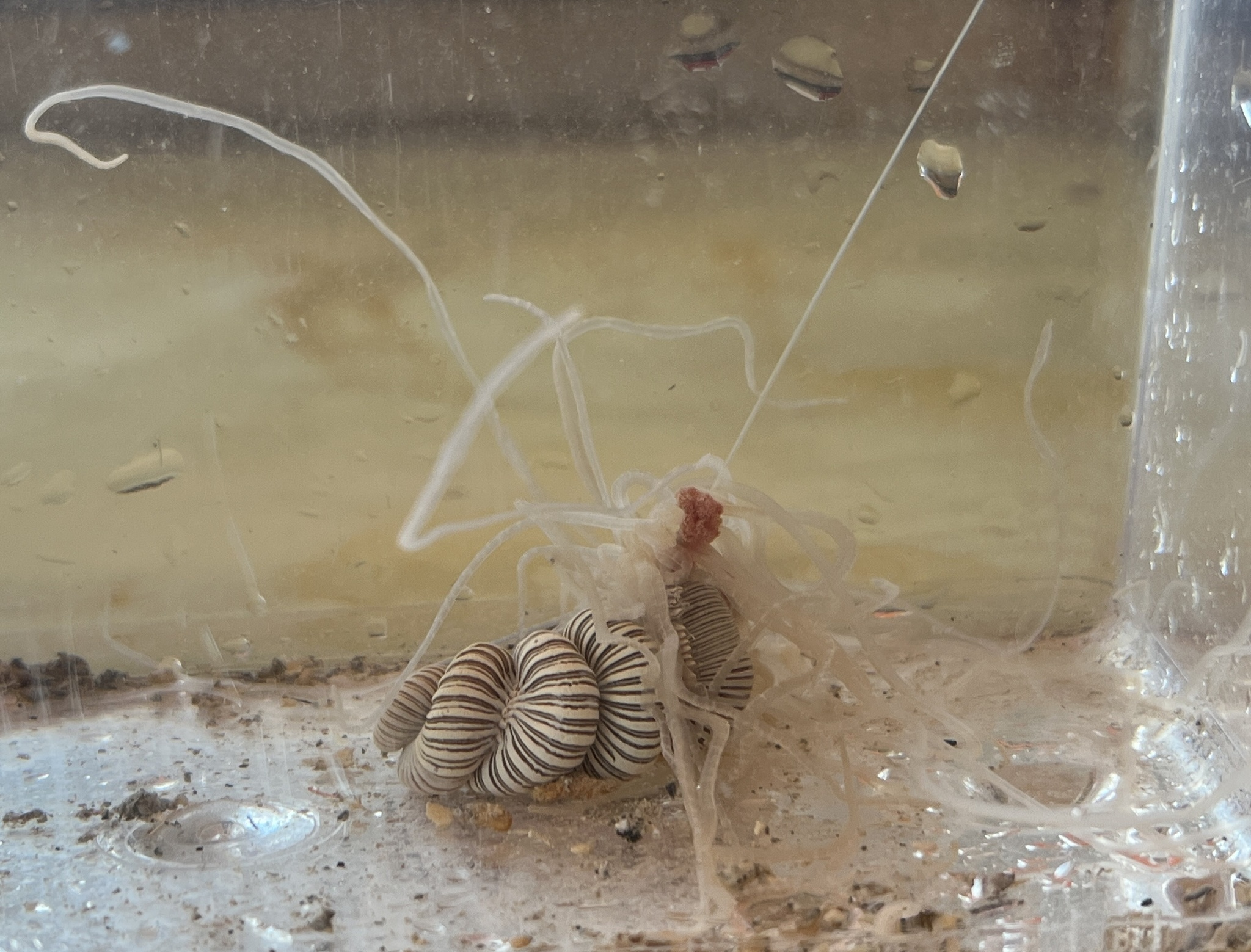

Scientific classification
- Kingdom: Animalia
- Phylum: Annelida
- Clade: Pleistoannelida
- Clade: Sedentaria
- Order: Terebellida
- Family: Terebellidae
- Genus: Eupolymnia
- Species: E. crassicornis

Binomial name
- Eupolymnia crassicornis (Schmarda, 1861)

= Eupolymnia crassicornis =

Species of annelid (spaghetti worm)

Eupolymnia crassicornis is a tropical species of annelid, commonly known as a spaghetti worm. These worms are found mainly near the Florida Keys and Puerto Rico. They can be found on the sea bottom near rocks and sand. They live buried in the sand where they create a tube-like structure. They extend their thin white tentacles out of the top of the tube in which they dwell.

== Diet ==
Eupolymnia crassicornis are deposit feeders that primarily feed at evening or night. They extend their ciliated tentacles out and along the sea-floor to gather dead organic matter (detritus) that originated as diatoms and other planktonic microorganisms. The collected detritus is then passed along a groove in their tentacles to their mouth, to be consumed.

== Anatomy ==
=== External ===
Spaghetti worms have tentacles that extend outside their burrow for a considerable distance. The bodies of spaghetti worms are segmented. The tentacles can grow over one meter long. The tentacles are used to wrap around their prey and bring it closer to the mouth. Eupolymnia crasscornis also has inner and outer lips for food gathering. They have adopted this way of life to protect their bodies from predators like gastropods and fish. They also share their burrow/home with other creatures such as the tube pea crab Pinnixa chaetopterana which they also use for protection. Spaghetti worms use three pairs of branched gills for breathing.

=== Internal ===
Spaghetti worms have a well-developed gut consisting of an oesophagus, fore-stomach, closed circulatory system, hind-stomach and intestine, and use enzymes to help carry out digestion.

== Reproduction ==
Spaghetti worms reproduce externally. They have lecithotrophic larvae. Unusually, both males and females have been observed to release gametes even when the other sex was not in the vicinity.
