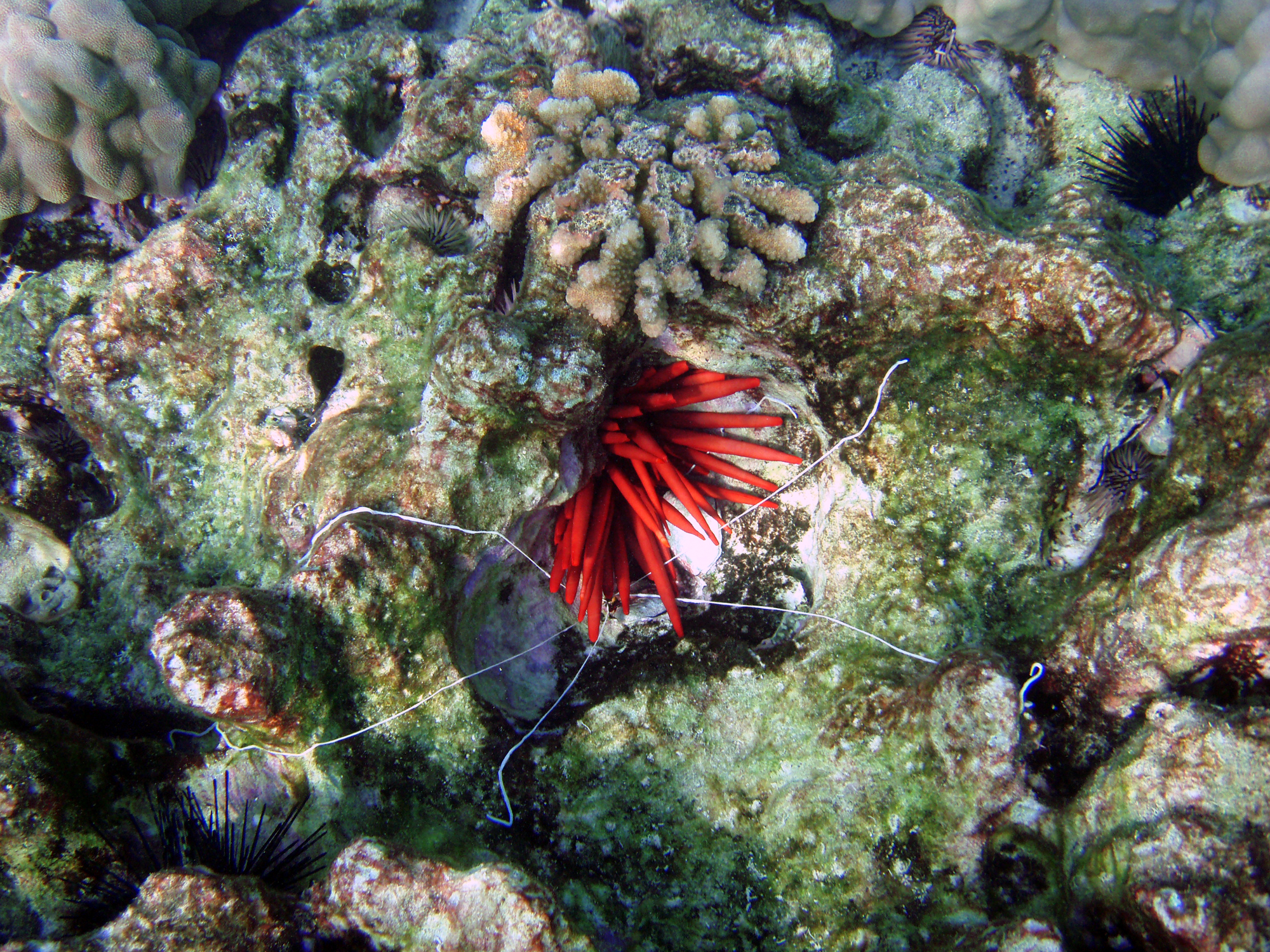
- Loimia medusa

Scientific classification
- Kingdom: Animalia
- Phylum: Annelida
- Clade: Pleistoannelida
- Clade: Sedentaria
- Order: Terebellida
- Family: Terebellidae
- Genus: Loimia; Malmgren, 1866

= Loimia =

Genus of annelid worms

Loimia is a genus of annelids belonging to the family Terebellidae.

The genus has cosmopolitan distribution.

Species:

- Loimia annulifilis (Grube, 1872)
- Loimia arborea Moore, 1903
- Loimia armata Carrerette & Nogueira, 2015
- Loimia bandera Hutchings, 1990
- Loimia batilla Hutchings & Glasby, 1988
- Loimia bermudensis Verrill, 1900
- Loimia borealis Wang, Sui, Kou & Li, 2020
- Loimia brasiliensis Carrerette & Nogueira, 2015
- Loimia contorta (Ehlers, 1908)
- Loimia crassifilis (Grube, 1878)
- Loimia decora Pillai, 1961
- Loimia grubei Holthe, 1986
- Loimia ingens (Grube, 1878)
- Loimia juani Nogueira, Hutchings & Carrerette, 2015
- Loimia keablei Nogueira, Hutchings & Carrerette, 2015
- Loimia macrobranchia Wang, Sui, Kou & Li, 2020
- Loimia medusa (Savigny, 1822)
- Loimia megaoculata Carrerette & Nogueira, 2015
- Loimia minuta Treadwell, 1929
- Loimia montagui McIntosh, 1922
- Loimia nigrifilis Caullery, 1944
- Loimia ochracea (Grube, 1877)
- Loimia pseudotriloba Nogueira, Hutchings & Carrerette, 2015
- Loimia ramzega Lavesque, Bonifácio, Londoño-Mesa, Le Garrec & Grall, 2017
- Loimia salazari Londoño-Mesa & Carrera-Parra, 2005
- Loimia savignyi McIntosh, 1885
- Loimia triloba Hutchings & Glasby, 1988
- Loimia tuberculata Nogueira, Hutchings & Carrerette, 2015
- Loimia turgida Andrews, 1891
- Loimia variegata (Grube, 1869)
- Loimia verrucosa Caullery, 1944
- Loimia viridis Moore, 1903
