= Amphitrite (annelid) =

Scientific classification
- Domain: Eukaryota
- Kingdom: Animalia
- Phylum: Annelida
- Clade: Pleistoannelida
- Clade: Sedentaria
- Order: Terebellida
- Family: Terebellidae
- Subfamily: Terebellinae
- Genus: Amphitrite; Müller, 1771

Species
- 21 species (see text)

Genus of annelid worms

Amphitrite is a genus of polychaetes belonging to the family Terebellidae. The genus has cosmopolitan distribution.

== Species ==
The World Register of Marine Species recognizes the following 21 species:

- Amphitrite alcicornis Fauvel, 1909
- Amphitrite attenuata Moore, 1906
- Amphitrite brunnea (Stimpson, 1853)
- Amphitrite buzhinskaje Jirkov, 2020
- Amphitrite chloraema (Schmarda, 1861)
- Amphitrite cirrata Müller, 1776
- Amphitrite fauveli Jirkov, Ravara & Cunha, 2018
- Amphitrite haematina (Grube, 1871)
- Amphitrite jucunda (Kinberg, 1866)
- Amphitrite kerguelensis McIntosh, 1876
- Amphitrite leptobranchia Caullery, 1944
- Amphitrite lobocephala Hsieh, 1994
- Amphitrite malayensis Caullery, 1944
- Amphitrite marchilensis Hartmann-Schröder, 1965
- Amphitrite oculata Hessle, 1917
- Amphitrite ornata (Leidy, 1855)
- Amphitrite rubra (Risso, 1826)
- Amphitrite rzhavskyi Jirkov, 2020
- Amphitrite scylla (Savigny, 1822)
- Amphitrite variabilis (Risso, 1826)
- Amphitrite ventricosa Bosc, 1802
