= Biremis =

Scientific classification
- Domain: Eukaryota
- Kingdom: Animalia
- Phylum: Annelida
- Clade: Pleistoannelida
- Clade: Sedentaria
- Order: Terebellida
- Family: Terebellidae
- Subfamily: Polycirrinae
- Genus: Biremis; Polloni, Rowe, & Teal (1973)
- Species: B. blandi

Binomial name
- Biremis blandi Polloni, Rowe, & Teal (1973)

Species of annelid

Biremis blandi is a species of marine polychaete worm and the only species in the genus Biremis. It was first described by Polloni, Rowe, and Teal in 1973. The species was discovered in 1971 during a dive by the research submersible DSV Alvin at 635 m (2,083 ft) in the Tongue of the Ocean in the Bahamas. It is named for Alvin pilot Edward L. Bland, Jr., who first observed it.

Biremis blandi is described as a terebellid worm with an enlarged tentacular lobe with numerous long tentacles, prominent longitudinal muscular ventral ridges, thoracic segments lacking chaetae, and abdominal segments with pinnules bearing uncini. The worm lacks eyes and gills. It has been observed swimming and resting on the ocean floor.
