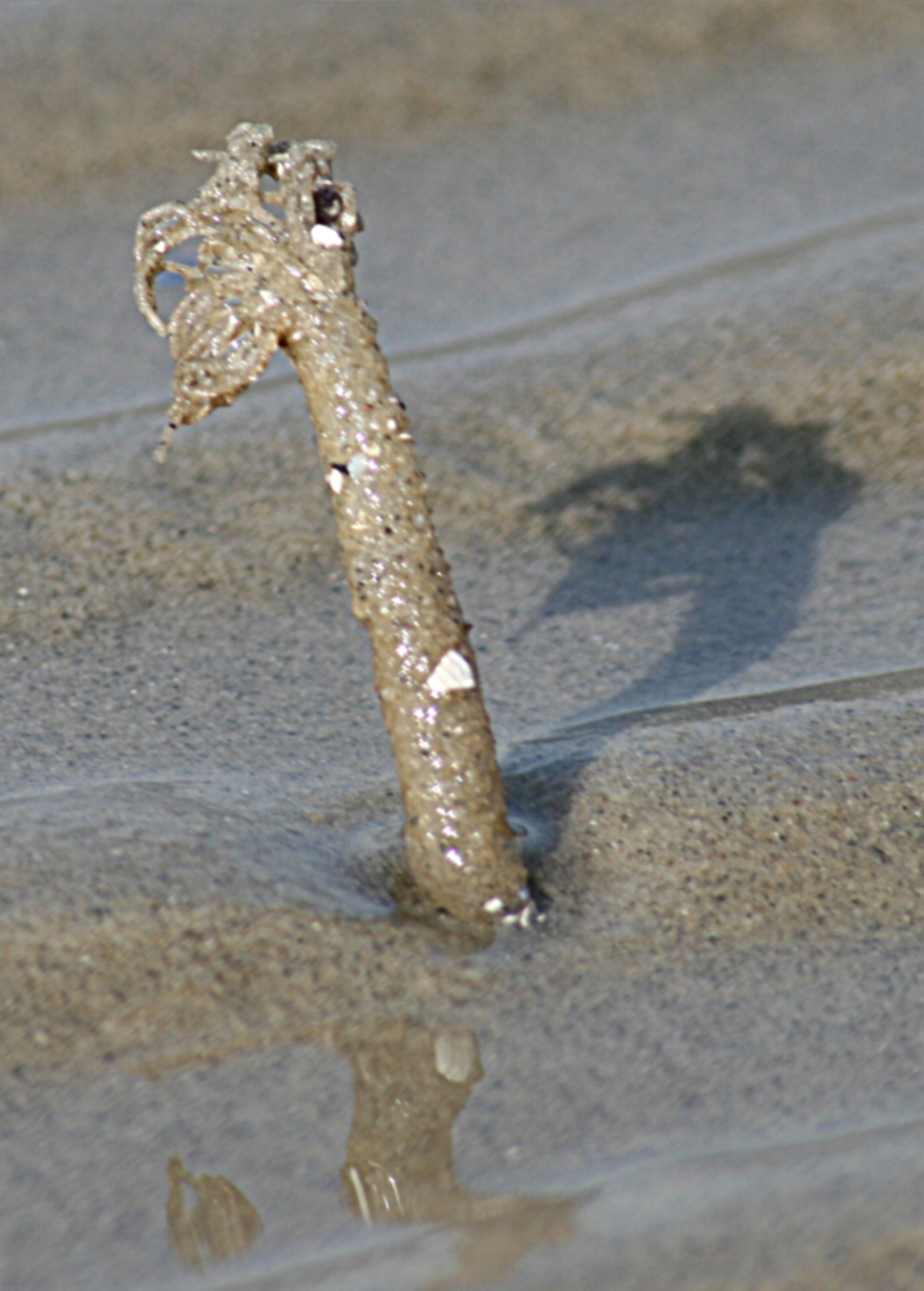
- Tube projecting from the sediment

Scientific classification
- Kingdom: Animalia
- Phylum: Annelida
- Clade: Pleistoannelida
- Clade: Sedentaria
- Order: Terebellida
- Family: Terebellidae
- Genus: Lanice
- Species: L. conchilega

Binomial name
- Lanice conchilega Pallas, 1766

Synonyms
- Amphitrite flexuosa Delle Chiaje, 1828; Amphitrite tondi Delle Chiaje, 1828; Nereis conchilega Pallas, 1766; Terebella artifex Sars, 1863; Terebella littoralis Dalyell, 1853; Terebella pectoralis Quatrefages, 1866; Terebella prudens Quatrefages, 1866; Wartelia gonotheca Giard, 1878

= Lanice conchilega =

Species of marine worm

Lanice conchilega, commonly known as the sand mason worm, is a species of burrowing marine polychaete worm. It builds a characteristic tube which projects from the seabed, consisting of cemented sand grains and shell fragments with a fringe at the top.

Polychaetes, or marine bristle worms, have elongated bodies divided into many segments. Each segment may bear setae (bristles) and parapodia (paddle-like appendages). Some species live freely, either swimming, crawling or burrowing, and these are known as "errant". Others live permanently in tubes, either calcareous or parchment-like, and these are known as "sedentary".

== Description ==
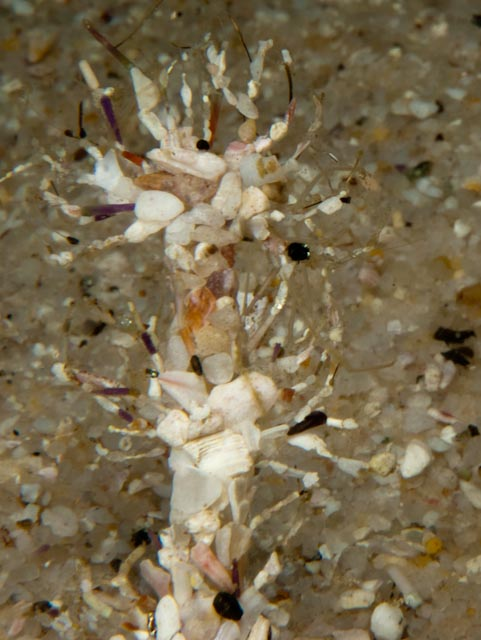
Lanice conchilega under water

L. conchilega can grow up to thirty centimetres long with as many as three hundred segments. It has an elongated body divided into two parts. The head bears a dense tuft of long, thin tentacles. The upper lip is narrow and encloses the mouth. The buccal segment has protruding lobes laterally and ventrally and there are many eye spots. Segments 2 to 4 bear branching gills with broad stems and a thick crown. The third segment has a large lobe that obscures the second segment. Posterior to these, the thoracic region consists of seventeen segments and is cylindrical and firm. There are glandular pads on the ventral sides of segments 14 to 20 which bear both hair-like and hooked chaetae. The long, slender abdomen is soft and bears only hooked chaetae. The worm is yellowish, pink or brown with pale-coloured tentacles and red gills.

== Distribution and habitat ==
L. conchilega is found in the northern hemisphere in many parts of the world. It is found living in soft sediments, sand or muddy sand and among Zostera and benthic algae. It is tolerant of low salinity and is found in the eulittoral zone and at depths down to 1700 metres.

== Biology ==
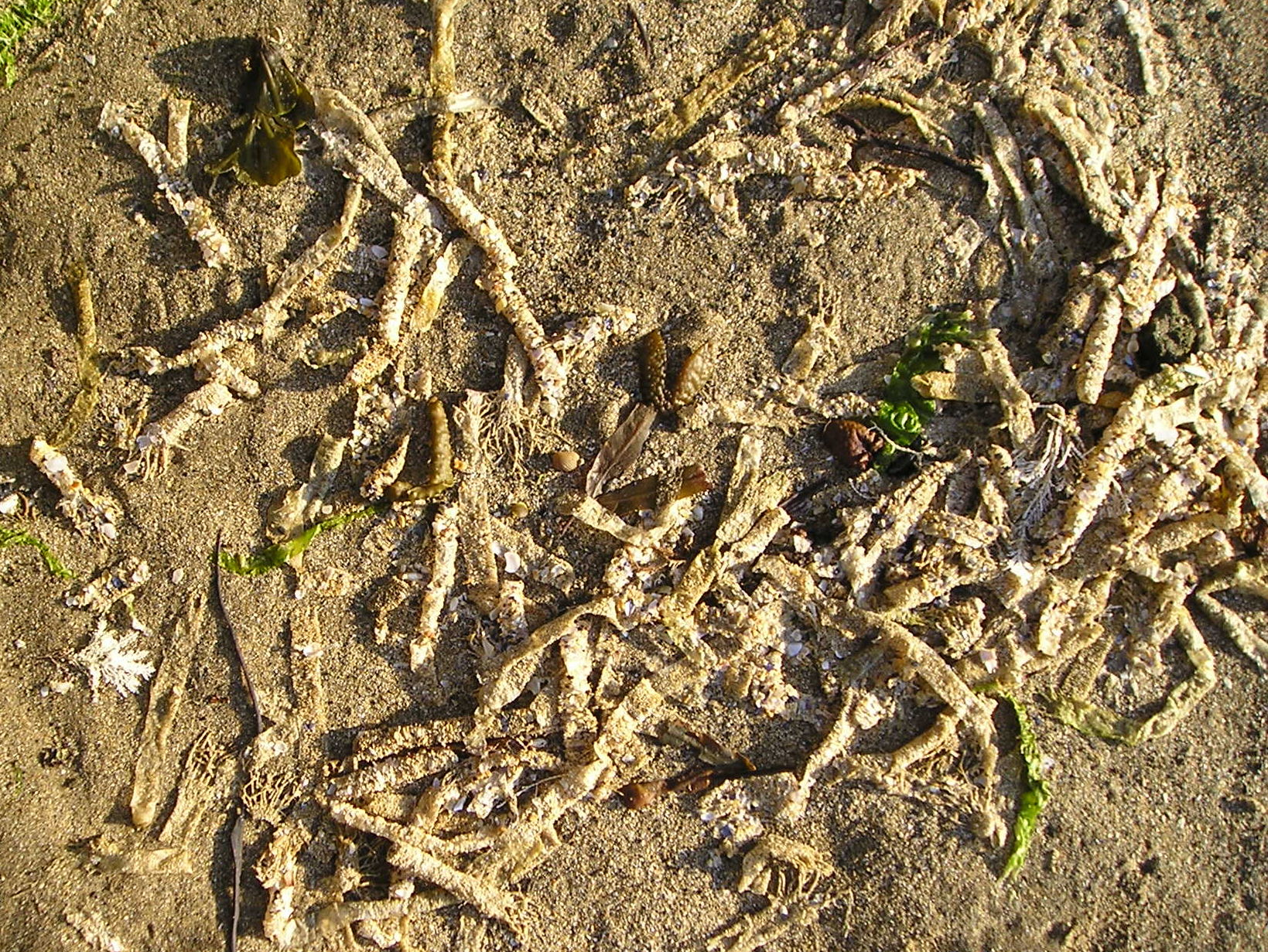
Tubes debris left by falling tide

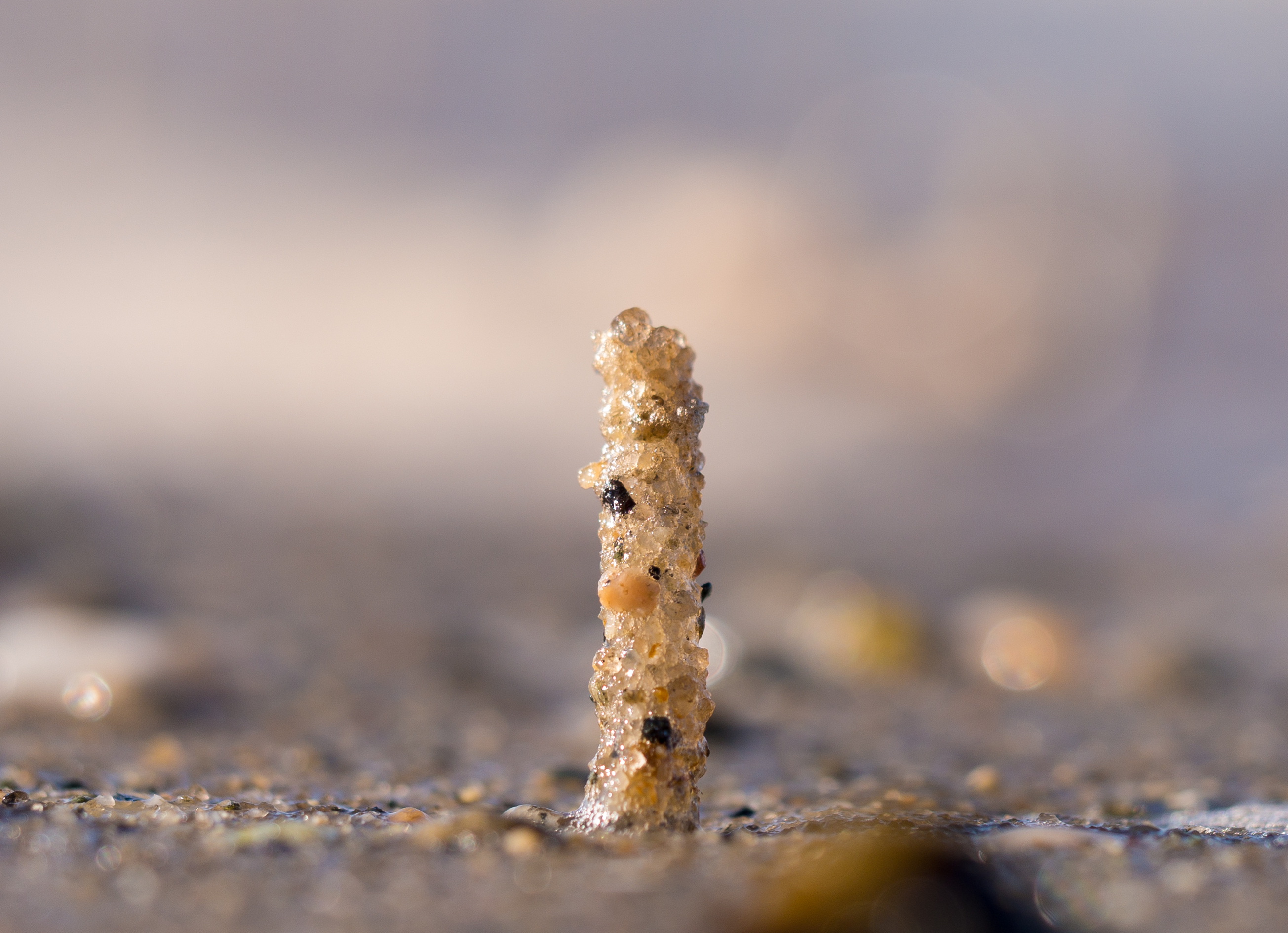
Tube of a sand mason worm

L. conchilega lives in a straight tube composed of large sand grains and shell fragments cemented with mucus that protrudes several centimetres from the surface of the sediment. The long tentacles protrude from the top searching for food particles and are supported by the fringe-like rim of the tube. The worm can retreat rapidly into the tube if danger threatens, and can extend the tube if it becomes buried in shifting sediment.

This worm can be found as a few scattered individuals or in populations of several thousand per square metre. Buhr and Winter considered it likely that at low densities, the worm is predominately a detritivore, feeding on organic particles such as foraminiferans, ciliates, copepods, algae and the faeces of echinoderms and molluscs. At higher densities, it is more likely to be a suspension feeder, feeding on plankton and other organic particles floating in the water column.

Individual mason worms are either male or female and breeding occurs in spring and summer in the northern hemisphere. The larvae remain suspended in the plankton for about two months and during that time may become widely dispersed. After about five days, each larva starts to form a tube of slime and detritus, in which it develops further, and by the time it is sixty days old and ready to settle, it has twelve to fourteen thoracic segments.

== Ecology ==
Large congregations of the mason worm can be considered as reef-building. Patches of tubes influence the habitat structure and are of consequence for the distribution and abundance of other species living under the seabed.

Between July and September the larvae contribute up to 15% of the zooplankton biomass.

L. conchilega is part of the diet of a number of wading birds and of young flat fish.
