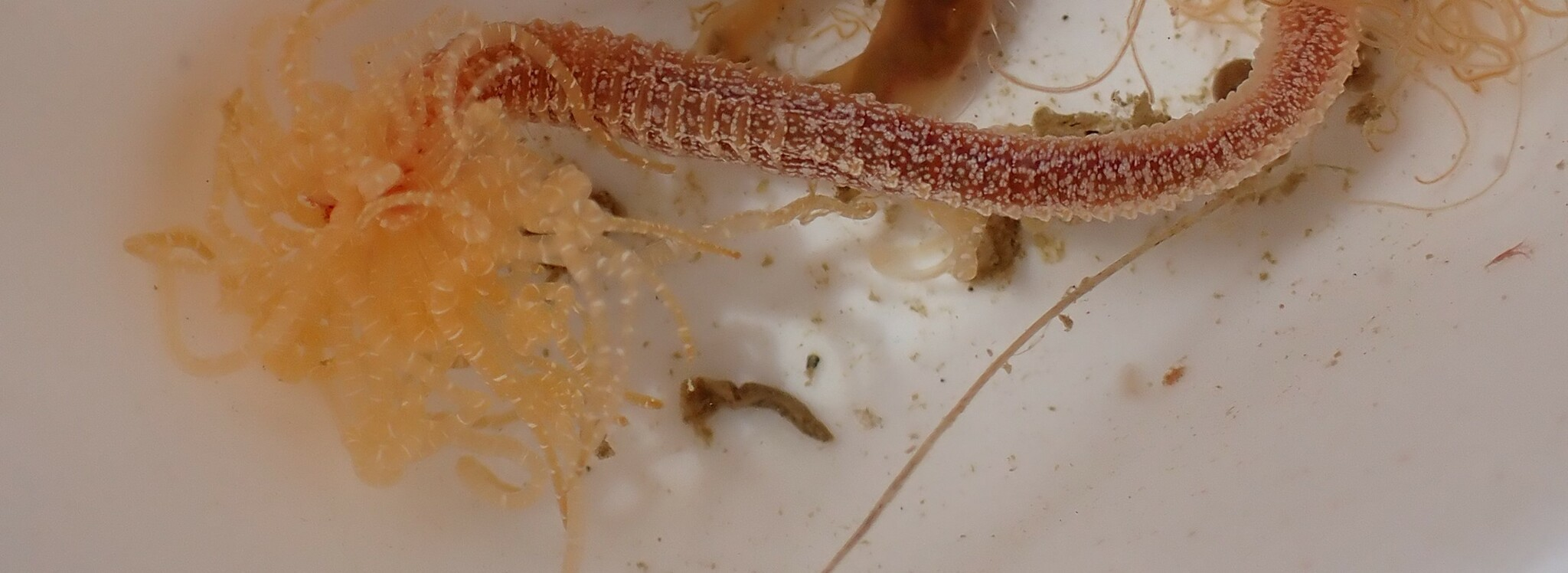
- Eupolymnia koorangia

Scientific classification
- Kingdom: Animalia
- Phylum: Annelida
- Clade: Pleistoannelida
- Clade: Sedentaria
- Order: Terebellida
- Family: Terebellidae
- Genus: Eupolymnia; Verrill, 1900

= Eupolymnia =

Genus of annelid worms

Eupolymnia is a genus of annelids belonging to the family Terebellidae.

The genus has an almost cosmopolitan distribution.

Species:

- Eupolymnia boniniana (Hessle, 1917)
- Eupolymnia capensis (McIntosh, 1924)
- Eupolymnia caulleryi Buzhinskaja, 2013
- Eupolymnia chlorobranchiata Nogueira, Hutchings & Carrerette, 2015
- Eupolymnia congruens (Marenzeller, 1884)
- Eupolymnia corae Carrerette & Nogueira, 2015
- Eupolymnia crassicornis (Schmarda, 1861)
- Eupolymnia dubia (Caullery, 1944)
- Eupolymnia gili Lavesque, Daffe, Londoño-Mesa & Hutchings, 2021
- Eupolymnia heterobranchia (Johnson, 1901)
- Eupolymnia intoshi (Caullery, 1944)
- Eupolymnia joaoi Capa & Hutchings, 2006
- Eupolymnia koorangia Hutchings & Glasby, 1988
- Eupolymnia labiata (Willey, 1905)
- Eupolymnia magnifica (Webster, 1884)
- Eupolymnia marenzelleri (Caullery, 1944)
- Eupolymnia meissnerae Lavesque, Daffe, Londoño-Mesa & Hutchings, 2021
- Eupolymnia nebulosa (Montagu, 1819)
- Eupolymnia nesidensis (Delle Chiaje, 1828)
- Eupolymnia regnans Chamberlin, 1919
- Eupolymnia robusta (Annenkova, 1925)
- Eupolymnia rullieri Londoño-Mesa, 2009
- Eupolymnia trigonostoma (Schmarda, 1861)
- Eupolymnia triloba (Fischli, 1900)
- Eupolymnia umbonis Hutchings, 1990
