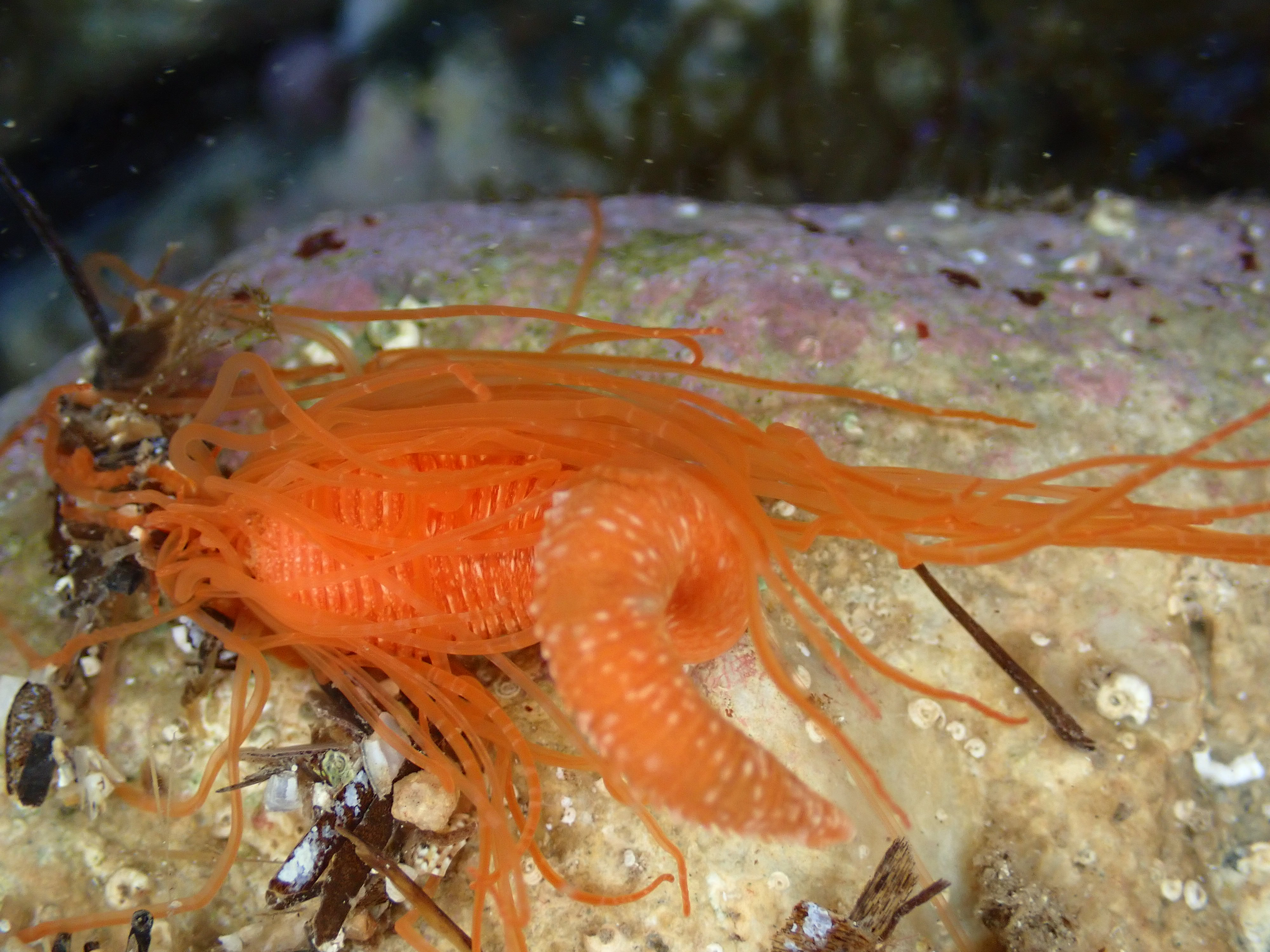

Scientific classification
- Domain: Eukaryota
- Kingdom: Animalia
- Phylum: Annelida
- Clade: Pleistoannelida
- Clade: Sedentaria
- Order: Terebellida
- Family: Terebellidae
- Genus: Eupolymnia
- Species: E. nebulosa

Binomial name
- Eupolymnia nebulosa (Montagu, 1818)

Synonyms
- List: Amphiro nebulosa Montagu, 1808; Amphitrite meckelii Delle Chiaje, 1822; Amphitritoides rapax Costa, 1862; Pallonia rapax Costa, 1862; Pista cristata occidentalis Bidenkap in Nordgaard, 1907; Polymnia nebulosa (Montagu, 1818); Terebella debilis Malmgren, 1866; Terebella nebulosa Montagu, 1818; Terebella tuberculata Dalyell, 1853

= Eupolymnia nebulosa =

Species of annelid worm

Eupolymnia nebulosa is a species of sedentary marine polychaete worm in the family Terebellidae. It builds a tube of slime under stones or large shells on soft substrates on the lower shore and down to depths of about 500 metres.

== Description ==
The tube built by E. nebulosa can be up to twenty-five centimeters long. The soft body is up to seventeen centimeters long, broadest in the front, tapering, yellowish or orange with white markings. The body is divided into about one hundred segments, seventeen of which have bristles growing out of small warts. There is a crown of numerous long, pinkish thread-like tentacles which writhe sinuously even when broken off. There are many eye spots on the dorsal surface and laterally behind the tentacles. There are three pairs of branched red gills on segments 2 to 4 and there are lateral lobes on the same segments. There are 14 to 15 ventral shields on the thorax and there are chaetae on all the segments from 4 onwards.

== Distribution ==
Eupolymnia nebulosa occurs in the eastern North Atlantic Ocean, round the coasts of South America, the Red Sea, the Persian Gulf, the Indian Ocean, Australian waters, the Kerguelen Islands, Japan, the Mediterranean Sea, the Scandinavian coast, the Kattegat, the Shetland Islands and the east coast of Scotland.

== Habitat ==
Eupolymnia nebulosa is found on soft substrates such as clay, silt, fine and coarse sand from the littoral zone down to about 500 metres.
