= Loimia medusa =

Scientific classification
- Kingdom: Animalia
- Phylum: Annelida
- Clade: Pleistoannelida
- Clade: Sedentaria
- Order: Terebellida
- Family: Terebellidae
- Genus: Loimia
- Species: L. medusa

Binomial name
- Loimia medusa (Savigny, 1822)

Species of annelid

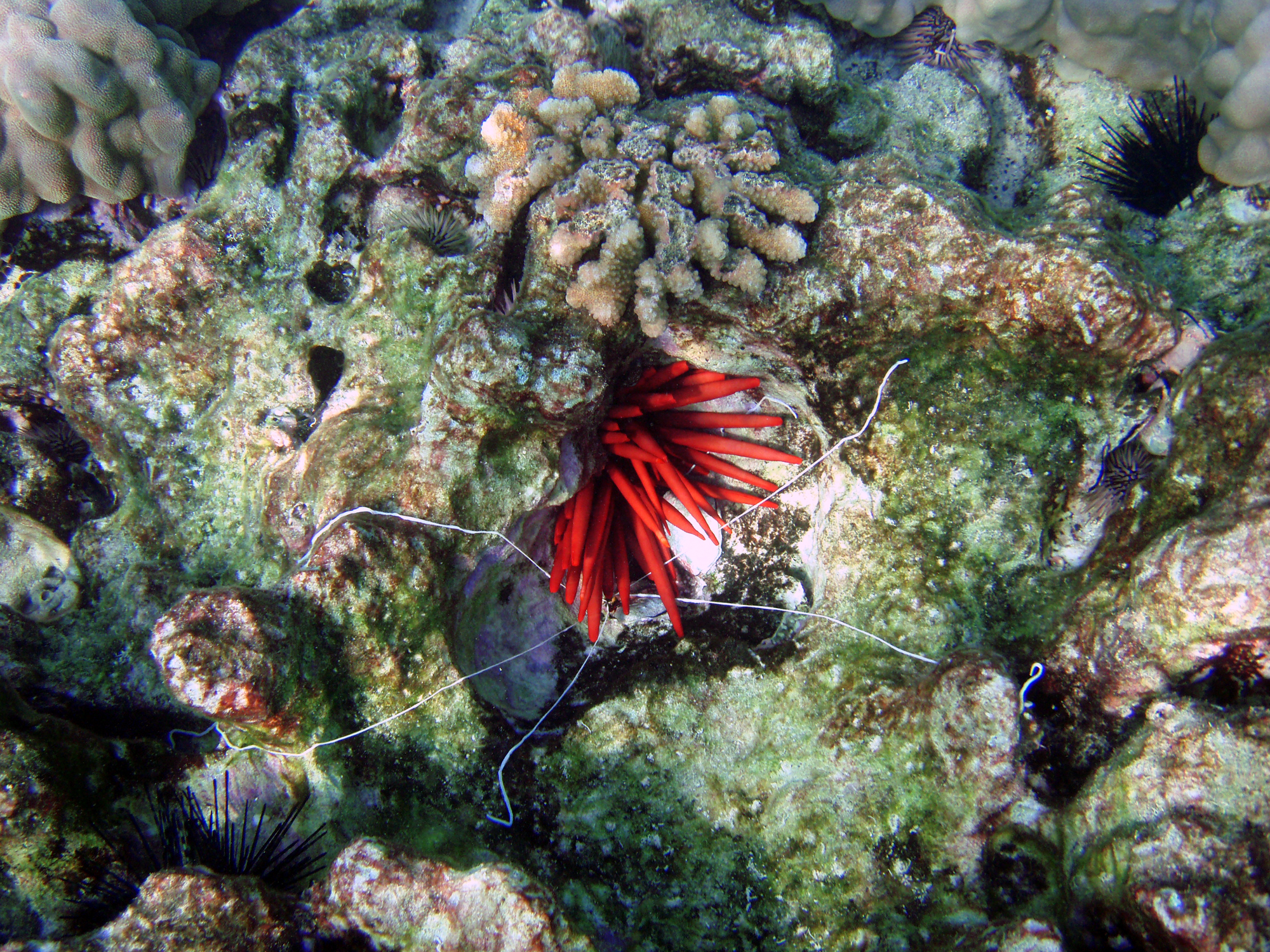
The white tentacles of the Spaghetti Sea worm, Loimia medusa are visible below the red spines of a red pencil sea urchin (Heterocentrotus mamillatus), underwater off the Big Island of Hawaii.

Loimia medusa, commonly known as the spaghetti worm or medusa worm, is an aquatic species of annelid belonging to the family Terebellidae.

== Description ==
Loimia medusa has long bluish white feeding tentacles that give the appearance of spaghetti noodles under any kind of rubble or rocks. Under those rocks, it has a body that is surrounded by a tube consisting of bits of shell and gravel, creating a tube that has a tough membranous lining with segments. The body can grow to be about 12 in (300 mm) long, while the tentacles can grow to twice that length.

== Distribution and habitat ==
Loimia medusa prefers tropical oceans, such as the Indo-Pacific and the Western Central Atlantic, including reefs off of the Hawaiian Islands.

Its habitat includes spaces such as tidepools, brackish waters, and bays that consist of rubble. They can also be found in sand and coral reefs in the deeper waters across the Hawaiian islands.

== Cultural significance ==
In Hawai'i, Loimia medusa is known as the Kauna'oa. During the Old Hawai'i times, this invertebrate was used for medicinal purposes.
