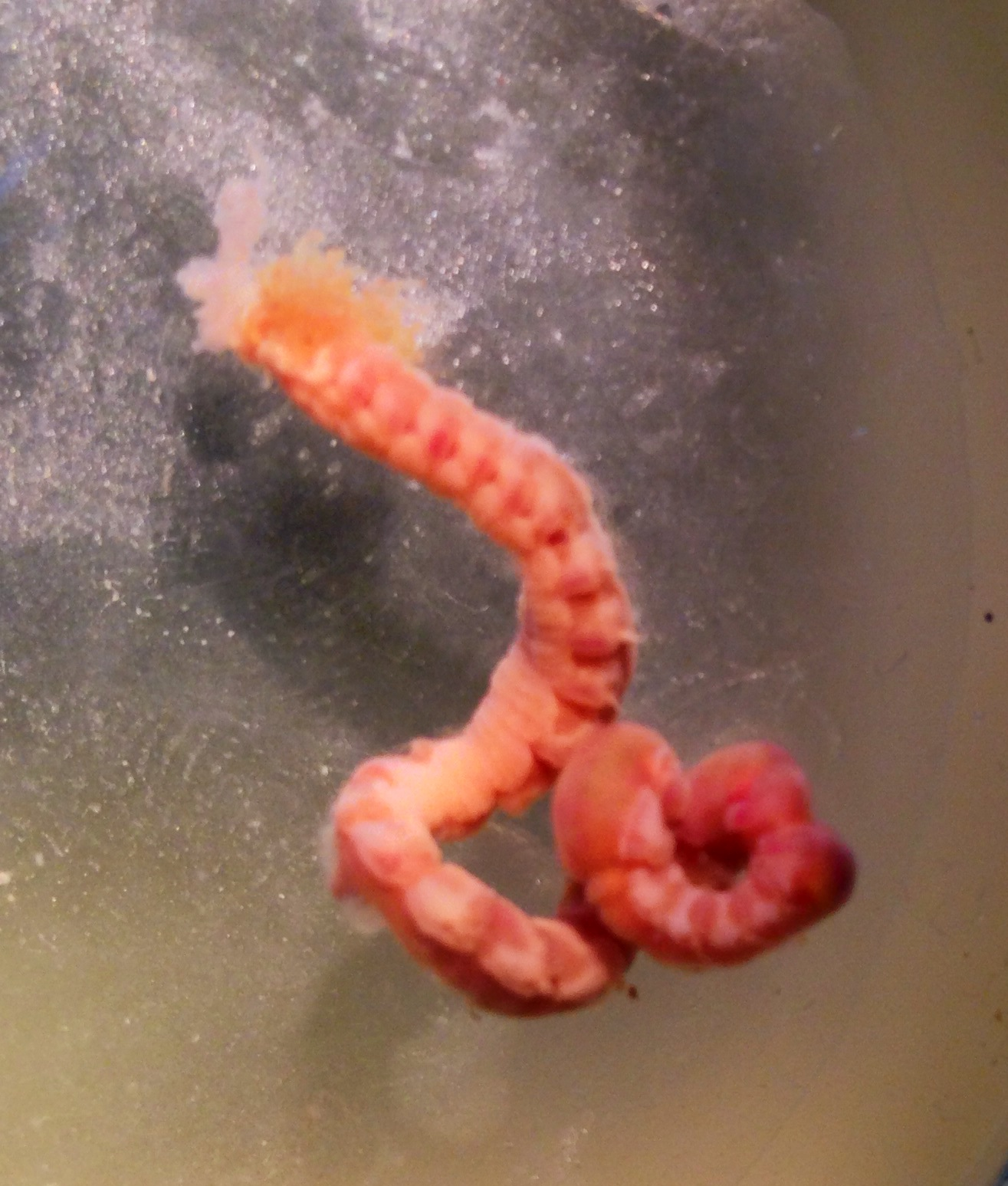

Scientific classification
- Domain: Eukaryota
- Kingdom: Animalia
- Phylum: Annelida
- Clade: Pleistoannelida
- Clade: Sedentaria
- Order: Terebellida
- Family: Terebellidae
- Genus: Thelepus
- Species: T. cincinnatus

Binomial name
- Thelepus cincinnatus (Fabricius, 1780)

= Thelepus cincinnatus =

Thelepus cincinnatus Temporal range: Holocene

Species of annelid worm

Thelepus cincinnatus is a species of polychaete annelids in the family Terebellidae (spaghetti worms), which can be found inhabiting a tube of secrete on rocks and shells. The worm is widely distributed, and can be found in almost any region of the oceans at depths ranging from 10 to 4000 meters.

== Morphology ==
Anteriorly, T. cincinnatus has several long feeding tentacles and two pairs of filiform branchia. The ventral lobes are thick and many eye spots can be seen. Notochaetae can be observed from the segment where the second branchia occurs, and uncini occur from the third segment. The worm itself is pink orange or brown with lighter colouration on the ventral side. The tentacles show the same colour variation as the body, but can include red pigment spots while the branchia are a deep red. The number of body segments is not predetermined but can exceed 100 while the total length of the animal can reach 200 mm.

== Ecology ==
Thelepus cincinnatus inhabits many kinds of benthic environments ranging from mud to rocks, where it constructs a tube made by secretions, which it attaches to a substrate. Often small sand grains and shell fragments can be seen on the tube. It is possible for the worm to turn around inside the tube, and can therefore extend its feeding tentacles outside of either end of the tube. The feeding tentacles are used to catch detritus, either as marine snow or by digging through sediment. Sexual reproduction occurs all year and it is assumed that the larvae are not pelagic.

== Systematics ==
18 species names are considered synonyms of T. cincinnatus.
