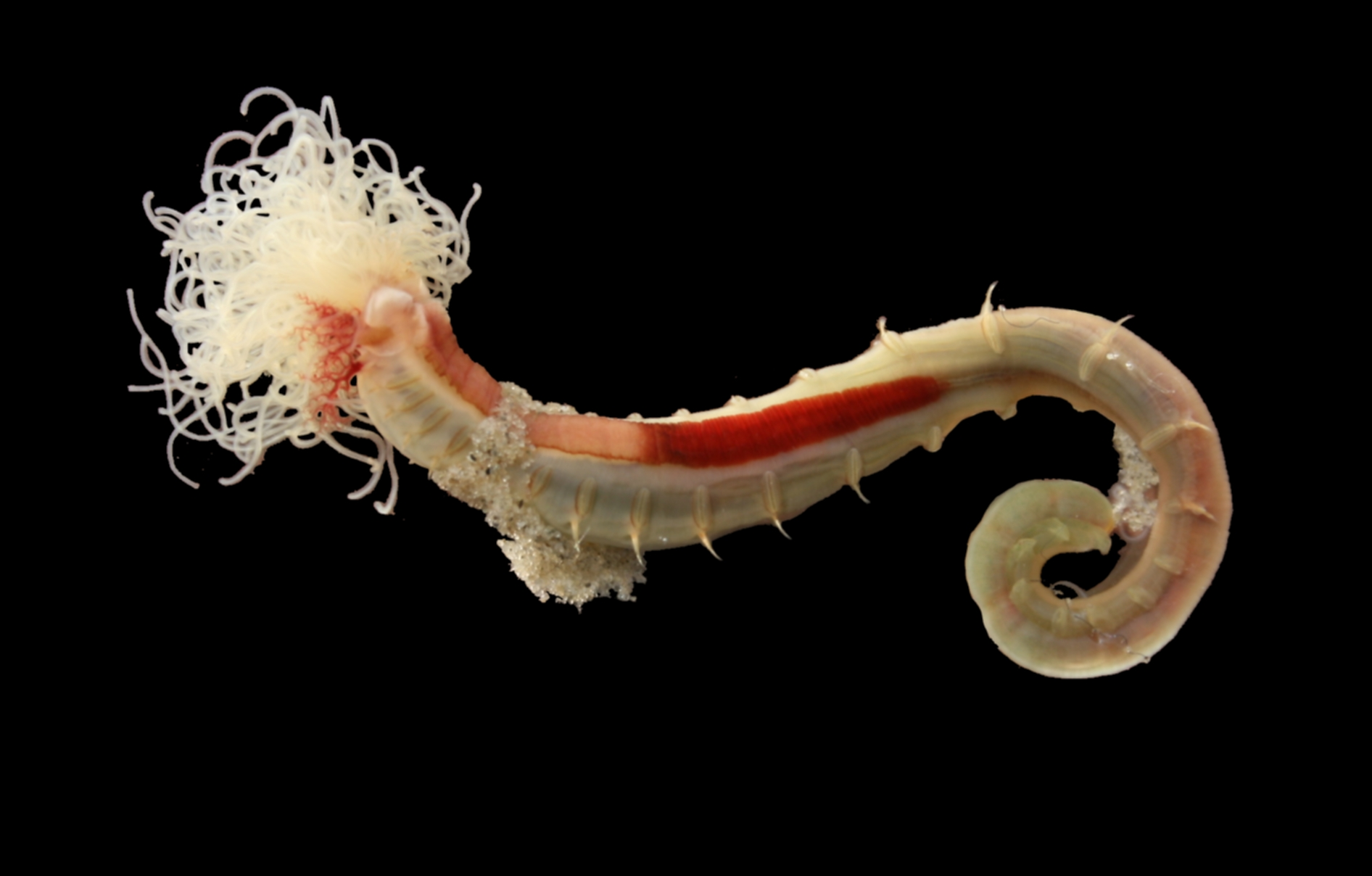

Scientific classification
- Kingdom: Animalia
- Phylum: Annelida
- Clade: Pleistoannelida
- Clade: Sedentaria
- Order: Terebellida
- Family: Terebellidae
- Subfamily: Terebellinae
- Genus: Lanice; Pallas, 1766

Species
- 16, see article

Synonyms
- Nereis; Eupolymnia

= Lanice =

Genus of annelids

Lanice, (also known as the sand mason worm), is a genus of burrowing marine polychaetes (commonly referred to as "bristle worms") typically found in the littoral zone.

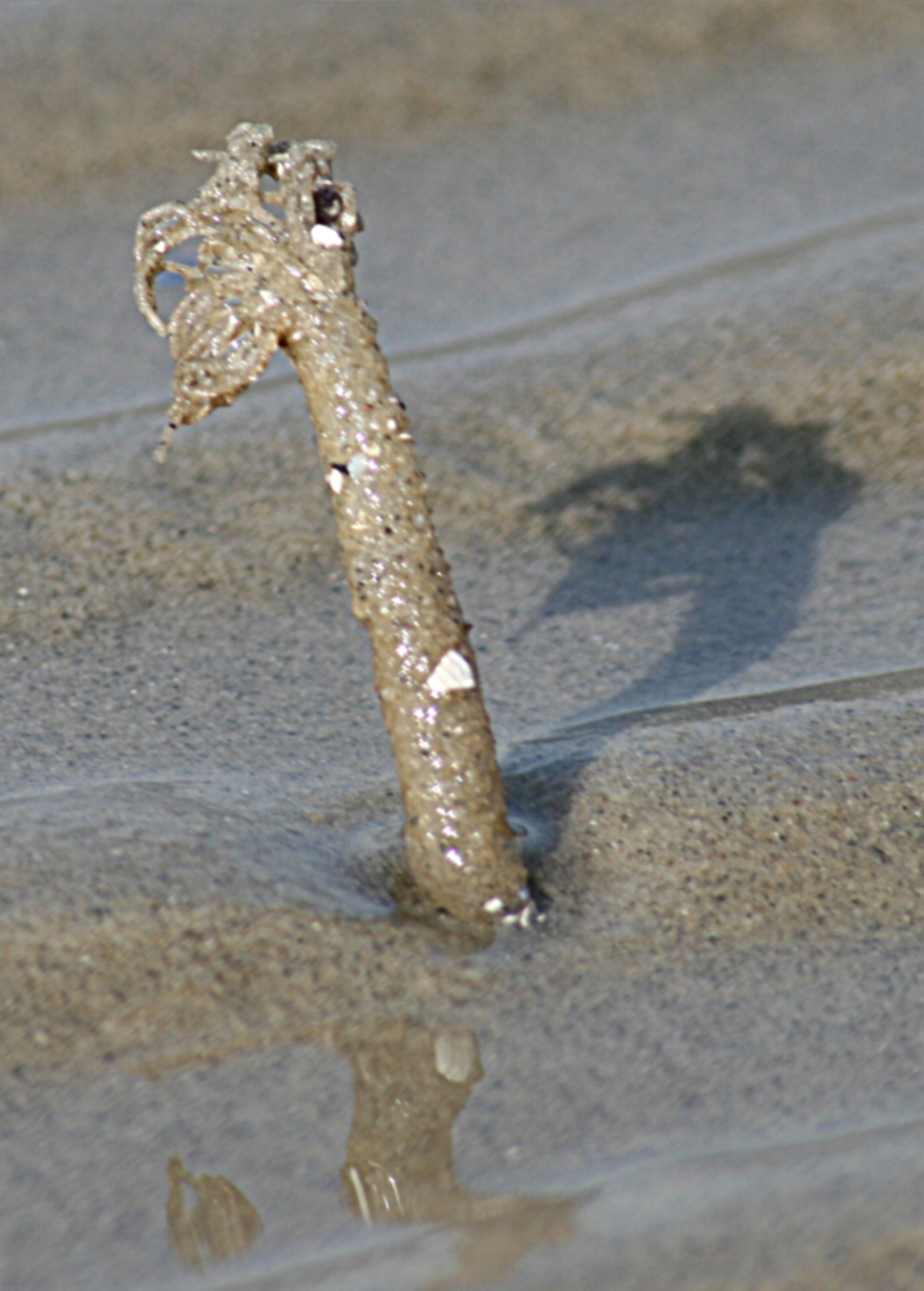
A Lanice conchilega tube on the Dutch Wadden Sea shore

L. conchilega is a common sight on European beaches and in tide pools. It is easily identifiable by the tube made of very small stones, shell fragments and mud stuck together with mucus topped with a mass of short hair-like protrusions that it leaves behind after burrowing back into the sediment. It appears somewhat like a piece of thin muddy rope with a frayed end protruding from the sand. It may even appear to be a species of slender sea anemone on first appearance, although they are only very distantly related.

== Species ==
- L. arakani (Hissmann, 2000)
- L. auricula (Hutchings, 1990)
- L. bidewa (Hutchings & Glasby, 1988)
- L. caulleryi (Holthe, 1986)
- L. conchilega (Pallas, 1766)
- L. expansa (Treadwell, 1906)
- L. fauveli (Day, 1934)
- L. flabellum (Baird, 1865)
- L. haitiana (Augener, 1922)
- L. marionensis (Branch, 1998)
- L. seticornis (McIntosh, 1885)
- L. sinata (Hutchings & Glasby, 1990)
- L. socialis (Willey, 1905)
- L. wollebaeki (Caullery, 1944)
- L. heterobranchia (Johnson, 1901)
- L. triloba (Fischli, 1900)

== Habitat ==
Marine, brackish or fresh water. They may be found on seamounts and knolls.

== Behavior ==
Worms of the genus Lanice are detritivores and filter feeders.
