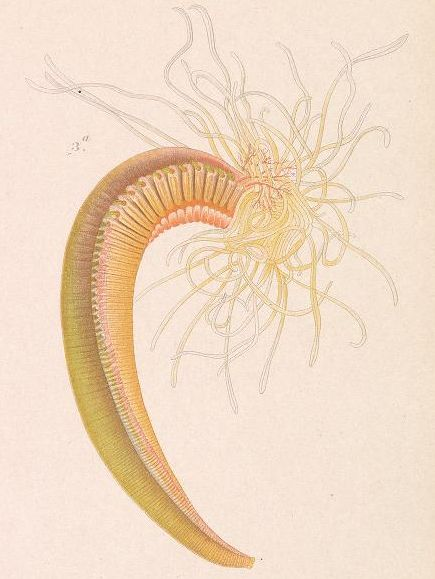
- Terebella lapidaria

Scientific classification
- Kingdom: Animalia
- Phylum: Annelida
- Clade: Pleistoannelida
- Clade: Sedentaria
- Order: Terebellida
- Family: Terebellidae
- Subfamily: Terebellinae
- Genus: Terebella; Linnaeus, 1767

Type species
- Terebella lapidaria Linnaeus, 1767

= Terebella =

Genus of annelid worms

Terebella is a genus of polychaetes and the type genus of the family Terebellidae. The name was first proposed in 1767 by Carl Linnaeus in the 12th edition of his Systema naturae. Linnaeus based the name on a description and six figures published by Martin Kähler in 1754 in Kongliga Svenska vetenskapsakademiens handlingar 15: 143–146, tab. III: A-F. Linnaeus placed one species in the genus: Terebella lapidaria, from the Mediterranean.

Species:

- Terebella aberrans Fauvel, 1949
- Terebella abyssicola (Verrill, 1885)
- Terebella alata Grube, 1858
- Terebella atricapilla Grube, 1869
- Terebella banksyi Lavesque, Daffe, Londoño-Mesa & Hutchings, 2021
- Terebella bilineata Baird, 1865
- Terebella cancellata Bather, 1911
- Terebella ceratobranchia (Caullery, 1944)
- Terebella chilensis Hartmann-Schröder, 1962
- Terebella copia Hutchings, 1990
- Terebella ehlersi Gravier, 1907
- Terebella ehrenbergi Grube, 1869
- Terebella frondosa Grube, 1859
- Terebella fulgida Agassiz, 1851
- Terebella gorgonae Monro, 1933
- Terebella haplochaeta (Ehlers, 1904)
- Terebella inversa (Willey, 1905)
- Terebella lapidaria Linnaeus, 1767
- Terebella leslieae Santos, Nogueira, Fukuda & Christoffersen, 2010
- Terebella lutensis Bather, 1911
- Terebella muliarrus Hutchings, 1993
- Terebella ochroleuca Grube, 1869
- Terebella orotavae (Langerhans, 1881)
- Terebella panamena Chamberlin, 1919
- Terebella pappus Hutchings & Murray, 1984
- Terebella parvabranchiata Treadwell, 1906
- Terebella plagiostoma Schmarda, 1861
- Terebella poirieri Rochebrune, 1882
- Terebella pterochaeta Schmarda, 1861
- Terebella punctata Hessle, 1917
- Terebella sarsii Grube, 1878
- Terebella schmardaei Day, 1934
- Terebella stenotaenia Grube, 1872
- Terebella subcirrata Grube, 1872
- Terebella tantabiddycreekensis Hartmann-Schröder, 1979
- Terebella tilosaula Schmarda, 1861
- Terebella verrilli Holthe, 1986
- Terebella verrucosa (Caullery, 1944)
- Terebella virescens Grube, 1869

== Extinct ==
- Terebella jinhuensis Yu & Wang, 1981 †
- Terebella lewesiensis Davies, 1879 †
- Terebella magna Ortmann, 1900 †
