= Hauchiella =

Scientific classification
- Domain: Eukaryota
- Kingdom: Animalia
- Phylum: Annelida
- Clade: Pleistoannelida
- Clade: Sedentaria
- Order: Terebellida
- Family: Terebellidae
- Genus: Hauchiella; Levinsen, 1893

Genus of annelid worms

Hauchiella is a genus of annelids belonging to the family Terebellidae.

The genus has almost cosmopolitan distribution.

Species:

- Hauchiella renilla Hutchings & Glasby, 1986
- Hauchiella tentaculata Nogueira, Hutchings & Carrerette, 2015
- Hauchiella tribullata (McIntosh, 1869)
