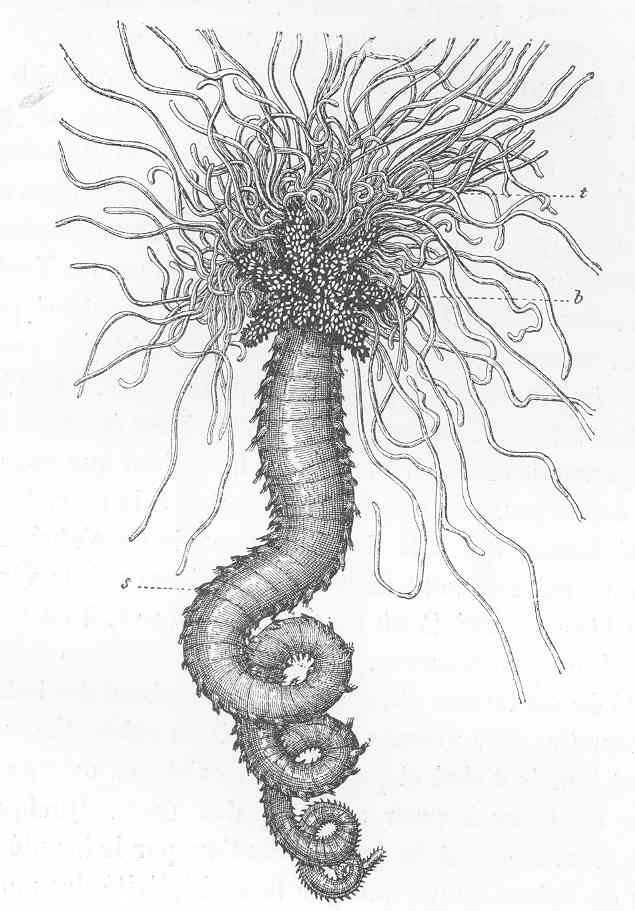
- Neoamphitrite edwardsi

Scientific classification
- Domain: Eukaryota
- Kingdom: Animalia
- Phylum: Annelida
- Clade: Pleistoannelida
- Clade: Sedentaria
- Order: Terebellida
- Family: Terebellidae
- Genus: Neoamphitrite; Hessle, 1917

= Neoamphitrite =

Genus of polychaetes

Neoamphitrite is a genus of polychaetes belonging to the family Terebellidae.

The genus has almost cosmopolitan distribution.

Species:

- Neoamphitrite affinis (Malmgren, 1866)
- Neoamphitrite edwardsii (Quatrefages, 1866)
- Neoamphitrite figulus (Dalyell, 1853)
- Neoamphitrite glasbyi Londoño-Mesa & Carrera-Parra, 2005
- Neoamphitrite grayi (Malmgren, 1866)
- Neoamphitrite groenlandica (Malmgren, 1866)
- Neoamphitrite hydrothermalis Reuscher, Fiege & Wehe, 2012
- Neoamphitrite pachyderma (Hutchings & Glasby, 1988)
- Neoamphitrite ramosissima (Marenzeller, 1884)
- Neoamphitrite robusta (Johnson, 1901)
- Neoamphitrite sibogae (Caullery, 1944)
- Neoamphitrite undevigintipes Choi, Kim & Yoon, 2020
- Neoamphitrite vigintipes (Grube, 1869)
