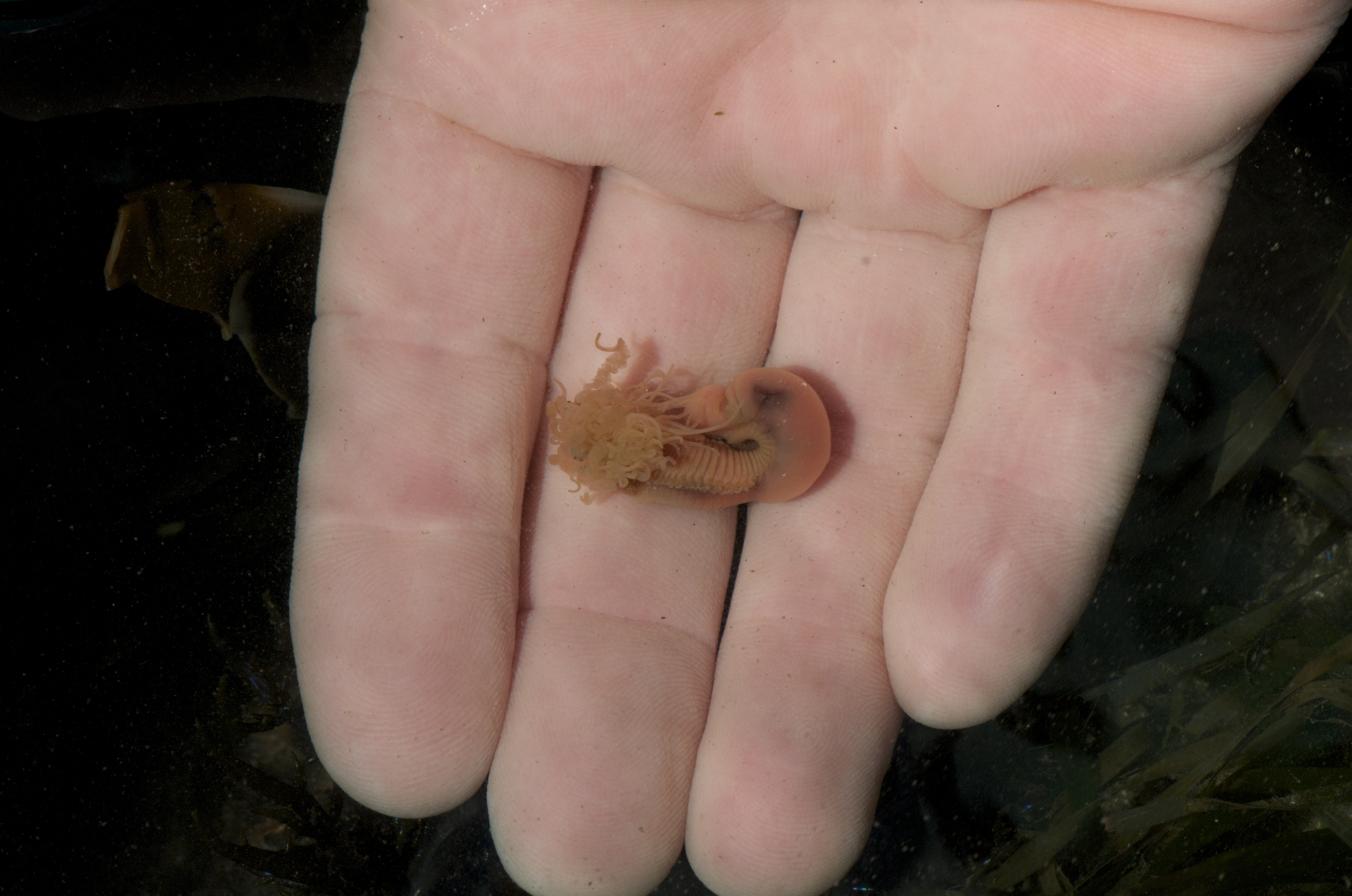
- Thelepus cincinnatus

Scientific classification
- Domain: Eukaryota
- Kingdom: Animalia
- Phylum: Annelida
- Clade: Pleistoannelida
- Clade: Sedentaria
- Order: Terebellida
- Family: Terebellidae
- Subfamily: Thelepodinae
- Genus: Thelepus; Leuckart, 1849

= Thelepus =

Genus of annelids

Thelepus is a genus of polychaetes belonging to the family Terebellidae.

The genus has cosmopolitan distribution.

== Species ==
Species:

- Thelepus abranchiatus (Hartman & Fauchald, 1971)
- Thelepus abyssorum Caullery, 1944
- Thelepus alatus Hutchings & Glasby, 1987
- Thelepus ambitus Glasby & Hutchings, 1987
- Thelepus angustitoris Caullery, 1944
- Thelepus antarcticus Kinberg, 1866
- Thelepus australiensis Hutchings & Smith, 1997
- Thelepus binakayanensis
- Thelepus binakayensis Pillai, 1965
- Thelepus boja Hutchings & Glasby, 1987
- Thelepus branchiatus Treadwell, 1906
- Thelepus brevicauda Hutchings & Glasby, 1987
- Thelepus brevitori Carrerette, Nogueira & Hutchings, 2017
- Thelepus cincinnatus (Fabricius, 1780)
- Thelepus corsicanus Lavesque, Londoño-Mesa, Daffe & Hutchings, 2020
- Thelepus crassibranchiatus Treadwell, 1901
- Thelepus crispus Johnson, 1901
- Thelepus davehalli Jirkov, 2018
- Thelepus dubius Caullery, 1944
- Thelepus extensus Hutchings & Glasby, 1987
- Thelepus fraggleorum Capa & Hutchings, 2006
- Thelepus haitiensis Treadwell, 1931
- Thelepus hamatus Moore, 1905
- Thelepus hemeiensis L.i.Hsueh, 2017
- Thelepus japonicus Marenzeller, 1884
- Thelepus laeviseta (Hartmann-Schröder, 1962)
- Thelepus leptoplocamus (Grube, 1878)
- Thelepus longtongensis L.i.Hsueh, 2016
- Thelepus malayensis (Caullery, 1944)
- Thelepus marenzelleri McIntosh, 1885
- Thelepus marthae Jirkov, 2018
- Thelepus mcintoshi Grube, 1877
- Thelepus megalabiatum Carrerette, Nogueira & Hutchings, 2017
- Thelepus microbranchiatus Caullery, 1944
- Thelepus natans Kinberg, 1867
- Thelepus nucleolata (Claparède, 1869)
- Thelepus opimus Hutchings, 1990
- Thelepus paiderotos Hutchings, Nogueira & Carrerette, 2015
- Thelepus parapari Jirkov, 2018
- Thelepus parcus (Grube, 1878)
- Thelepus pascua (Fauchald, 1977)
- Thelepus paucibranchis (Grube, 1878)
- Thelepus pequenianus Augener, 1918
- Thelepus pericensis Chamberlin, 1919
- Thelepus praecox Hutchings & Glasby, 1987
- Thelepus pulvinus Hutchings, 1990
- Thelepus robustus (Grube, 1878)
- Thelepus setosus (Quatrefages, 1866)
- Thelepus taamensis Caullery, 1944
- Thelepus taiwanensis Hsueh, 2016
- Thelepus tenuis (Verrill, 1900)
- Thelepus thoracicus (Grube, 1870)
- Thelepus toyamaensis Okuda, 1936
- Thelepus triserialis (Grube, 1855)
- Thelepus vaughani Gravier, 1906
- Thelepus verrilli (Treadwell, 1911)
- Thelepus wuchiensis Hsueh, 2017
