= Lanassa (annelid) =

Scientific classification
- Kingdom: Animalia
- Phylum: Annelida
- Clade: Pleistoannelida
- Clade: Sedentaria
- Order: Terebellida
- Family: Terebellidae
- Genus: Lanassa; Malmgren, 1866

Genus of annelid worms

Lanassa is a genus of annelids belonging to the family Terebellidae.

The genus has almost cosmopolitan distribution.

Species:

- Lanassa benthaliana McIntosh, 1885
- Lanassa capensis Day, 1955
- Lanassa exelysis Hutchings & Glasby, 1988
- Lanassa gracilis (Moore, 1923)
- Lanassa nordenskioeldi Malmgren, 1866
- Lanassa nordenskioldi Malmgren, 1866
- Lanassa ocellata Hutchings & Glasby, 1988
- Lanassa praecox (Saint-Joseph, 1899)
- Lanassa sarsi McIntosh, 1885
- Lanassa venusta (Malm, 1874)
