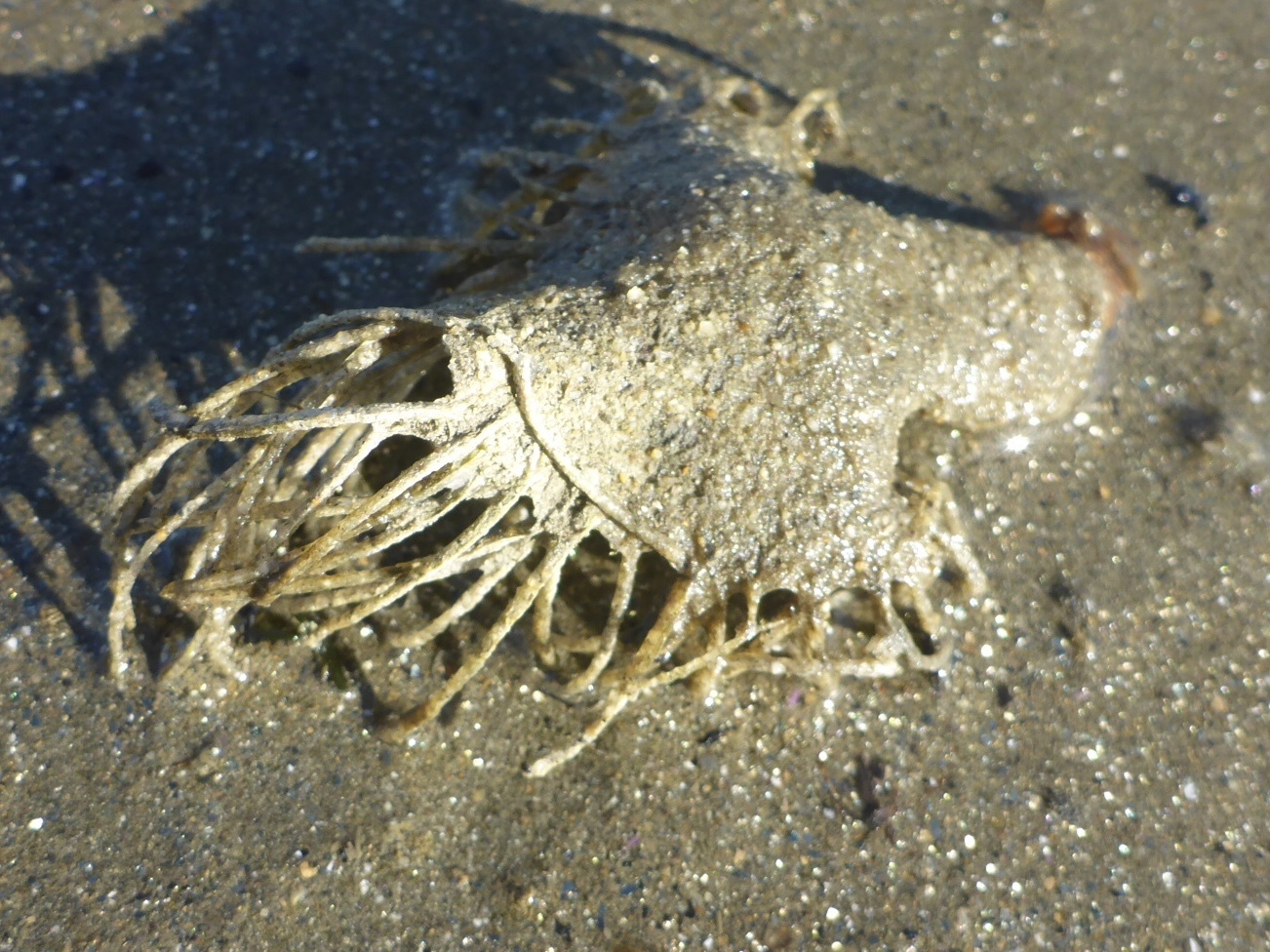

Scientific classification
- Kingdom: Animalia
- Phylum: Annelida
- Clade: Pleistoannelida
- Clade: Sedentaria
- Order: Terebellida
- Family: Terebellidae
- Subfamily: Terebellinae
- Genus: Pista; Malmgren, 1866

= Pista =

Genus of annelid worms

Pista is a genus of polychaete worms comprising around 100 species.

== Selected species ==
- Pista pacifica Berkeley & Berkeley, 1942
