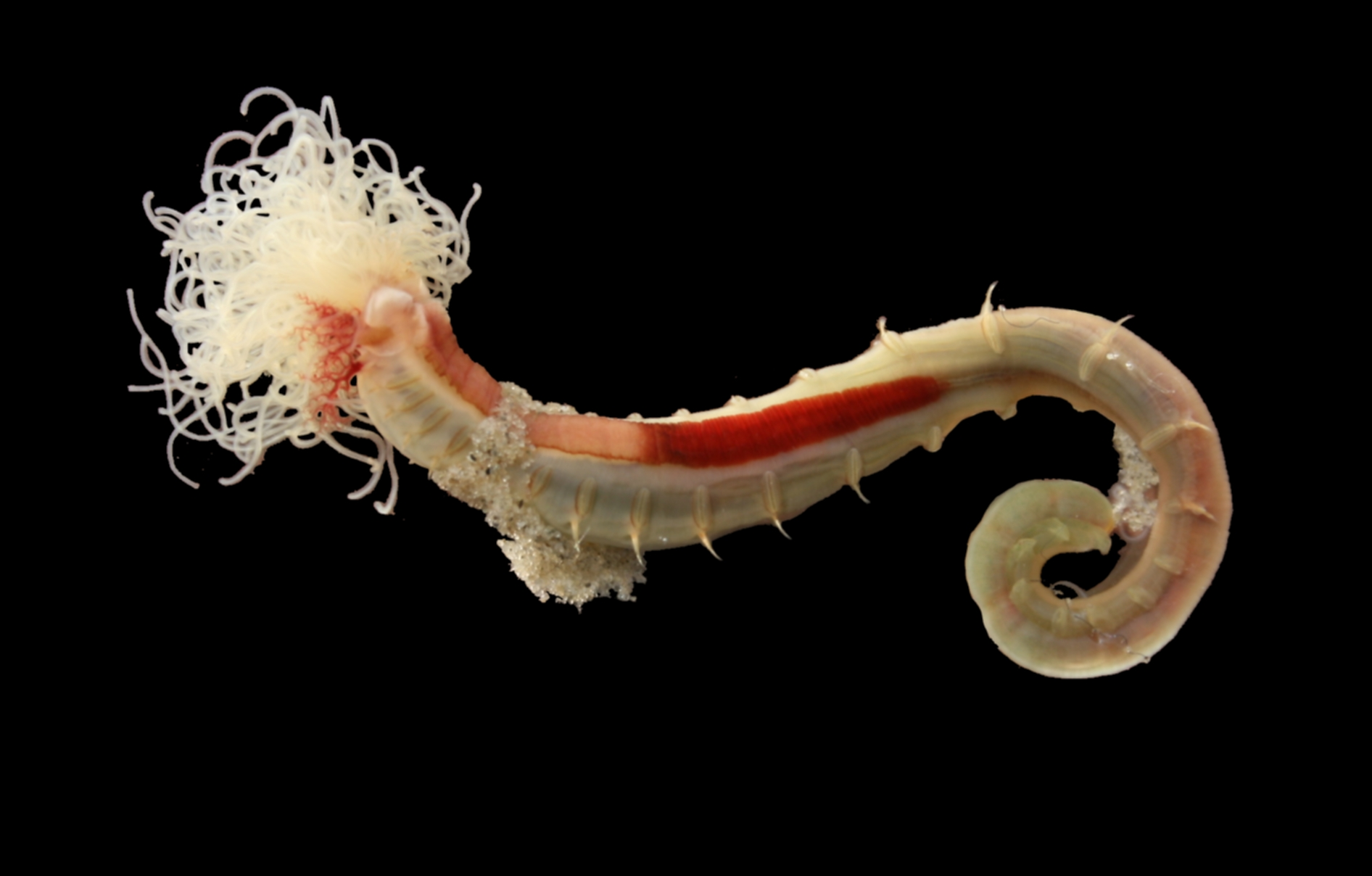
- Lanice conchilega (Terebellinae), taken out of its burrow. Note "spaghetti" tentacles on head.

Scientific classification
- Kingdom: Animalia
- Phylum: Annelida
- Clade: Pleistoannelida
- Clade: Sedentaria
- Order: Terebellida
- Suborder: Terebellomorpha
- Family: Terebellidae; Grube, 1851

Subfamilies
- 4, see text

= Terebellidae =

Family of annelid worms

The Terebellidae are a marine family of polychaete worms, of which the type taxon is Terebella, named by Carl Linnaeus in his 1767 12th edition of Systema naturae.

== Characteristics ==
Most terebellids live in burrows or crevices and are often of large size, ranging up to 150 millimetres in length and 15 millimetres in width. The numerous, very long tentacles which radiate from near the mouth are used for finding and collecting food particles from the sediment surface. The tentacles are not retractable as is the case in the ampharetids. They have plump anterior bodies and numerous segments in their long, tapered posterior bodies, whereas ampharetids are more compact. They have branched gills laterally on up to three anterior chaetigers but in the subfamily Thelepodinae the gills are numerous simple filaments. The mid-body chaetigers are in double rows in the subfamily Terebellinae. In the subfamily Polycirrinae, the gills are absent and the prostomium is expanded as an undulating membrane which bears the tentacles. Notably, some of these worms are the only known violet or purple bioluminescent animals.

== Systematics ==
The roughly 400 known species are divided between many dozens of genera. Most of these are assigned to 4 subfamilies. Some additional genera are of unresolved or quite basal position.

- subfamily Polycirrinae Malmgren, 1867
  - genus Amaeana Hartman, 1959
  - genus Biremis Polloni, Rowe & Teal, 1973
  - genus Enoplobranchus Verrill, 1879
  - genus Hauchiella Levinsen, 1893
  - genus Lysilla Malmgren, 1866
  - genus Polycirrus Grube, 1850
- subfamily Terebellinae Malmgren, 1867
  - genus Amphitrite O.F. Müller, 1771
  - genus Amphitritides Augener, 1922
  - genus Arranooba Hutchings & Glasby, 1988
  - genus Artacama Malmgren, 1866
  - genus Articulatia Nogueira, Hutchings & Amaral, 2003
  - genus Axionice Malmgren, 1866
  - genus Baffinia Wesenberg-Lund, 1950
  - genus Bathya Saint-Joseph, 1894
  - genus Betapista Banse, 1980
  - genus Colymmatops Peters, 1855
  - genus Eupistella Chamberlin, 1919
  - genus Eupolymnia Verrill, 1900
  - genus Hadrachaeta Hutchings, 1977
  - genus Hutchingsiella Londono-Mesa, 2003
  - genus Lanassa Malmgren, 1866
  - genus Lanice Malmgren, 1866
  - genus Lanicides Hessle, 1917
  - genus Lanicola Hartmann-Schröder, 1986
  - genus Laphania Malmgren, 1866
  - genus Leaena Malmgren, 1866
  - genus Loimia Malmgren, 1865
  - genus Longicarpus Hutchings & Murray, 1984
  - genus Morgana Nogueira & Amaral, 2001
  - genus Neoamphitrite Hessle, 1917
  - genus Neoleprea Hessle, 1917
  - genus Nicolea Malmgren, 1866
  - genus Opisthopista Caullery, 1944
  - genus Paralanice Caullery, 1944
  - genus Paramphitrite Holthe, 1976
  - genus Paraxionice Fauchald, 1972
  - genus Phisidia Saint-Joseph, 1894
  - genus Pista Malmgren, 1866
  - genus Pistella Hartmann-Schröder, 1996
  - genus Polymniella Verrill, 1900
  - genus Proclea Saint-Joseph, 1894
  - genus Pseudopista Hutchings & Smith, 1997
  - genus Pseudoproclea Hutchings & Glasby, 1990
  - genus Ramex Hartman, 1944
  - genus Reteterebella Hartman, 1963
  - genus Scionella Moore, 1903
  - genus Scionides Chamberlin, 1919
  - genus Spinosphaera Hessle, 1917
  - genus Spiroverma Uchida, 1968
  - genus Stschapovella Levenstein, 1957
  - genus Terebella Linnaeus, 1767
  - genus Terebellanice Hartmann-Schröder, 1962
  - genus Terebellobranchia Day, 1951
  - genus Tyira Hutchings, 1997
- subfamily Thelepodinae Hessle, 1917
  - genus Decathelepus Hutchings, 1977
  - genus Euthelepus McIntosh, 1885
  - genus Glossothelepus Hutchings & Glasby, 1986
  - genus Parathelepus Caullery, 1915
  - genus Pseudoampharete Hartmann-Schröder, 1960
  - genus Pseudostreblosoma Hutchings & Murray, 1984
  - genus Pseudothelepus Augener, 1918
  - genus Rhinothelepus Hutchings, 1974
  - genus Streblosoma Sars, 1872
  - genus Telothelepus Day, 1955
  - genus Thelepides Gravier, 1911
  - genus Thelepus Leuckart, 1849

== Gallery ==
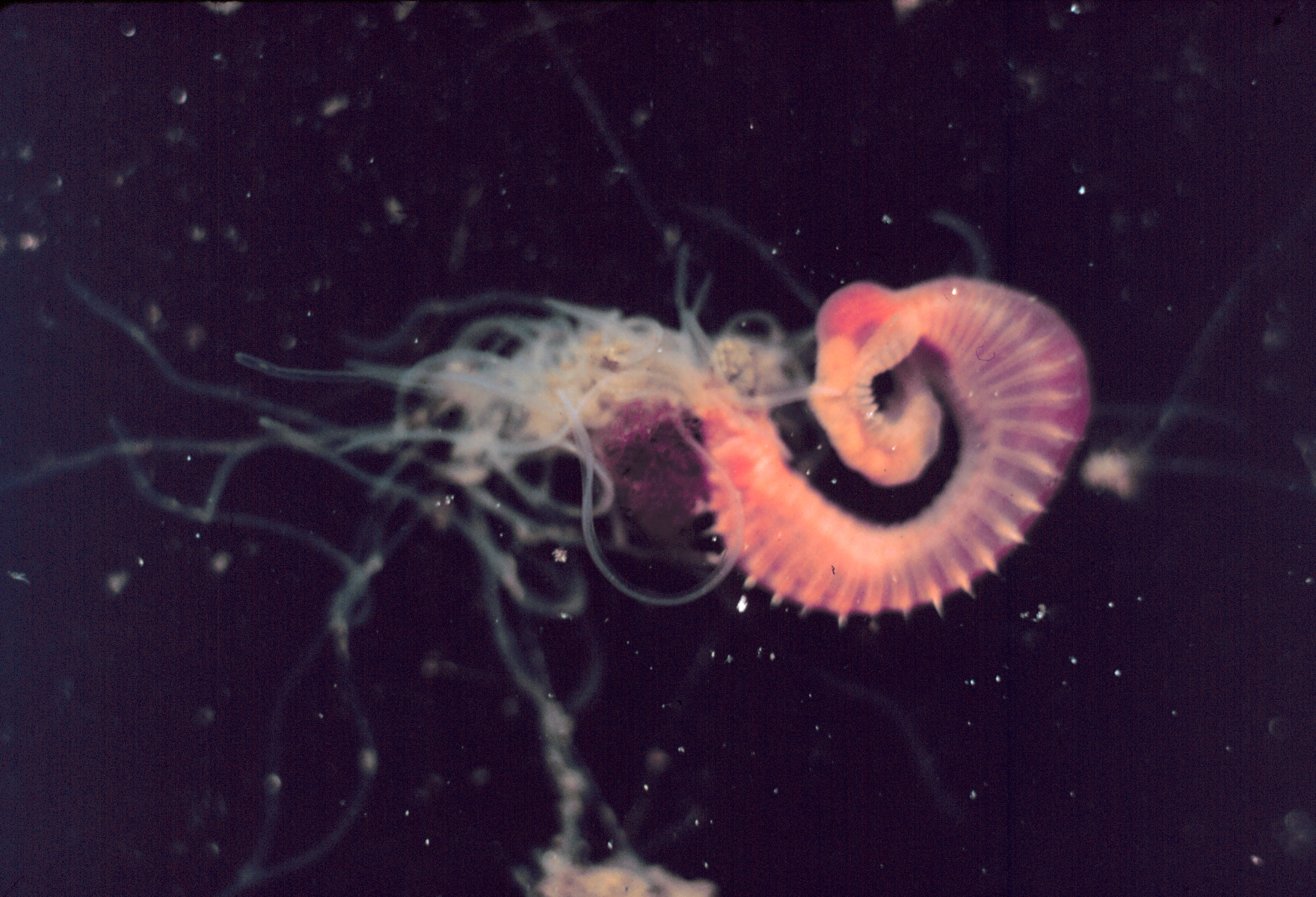
Amphitrite sp.

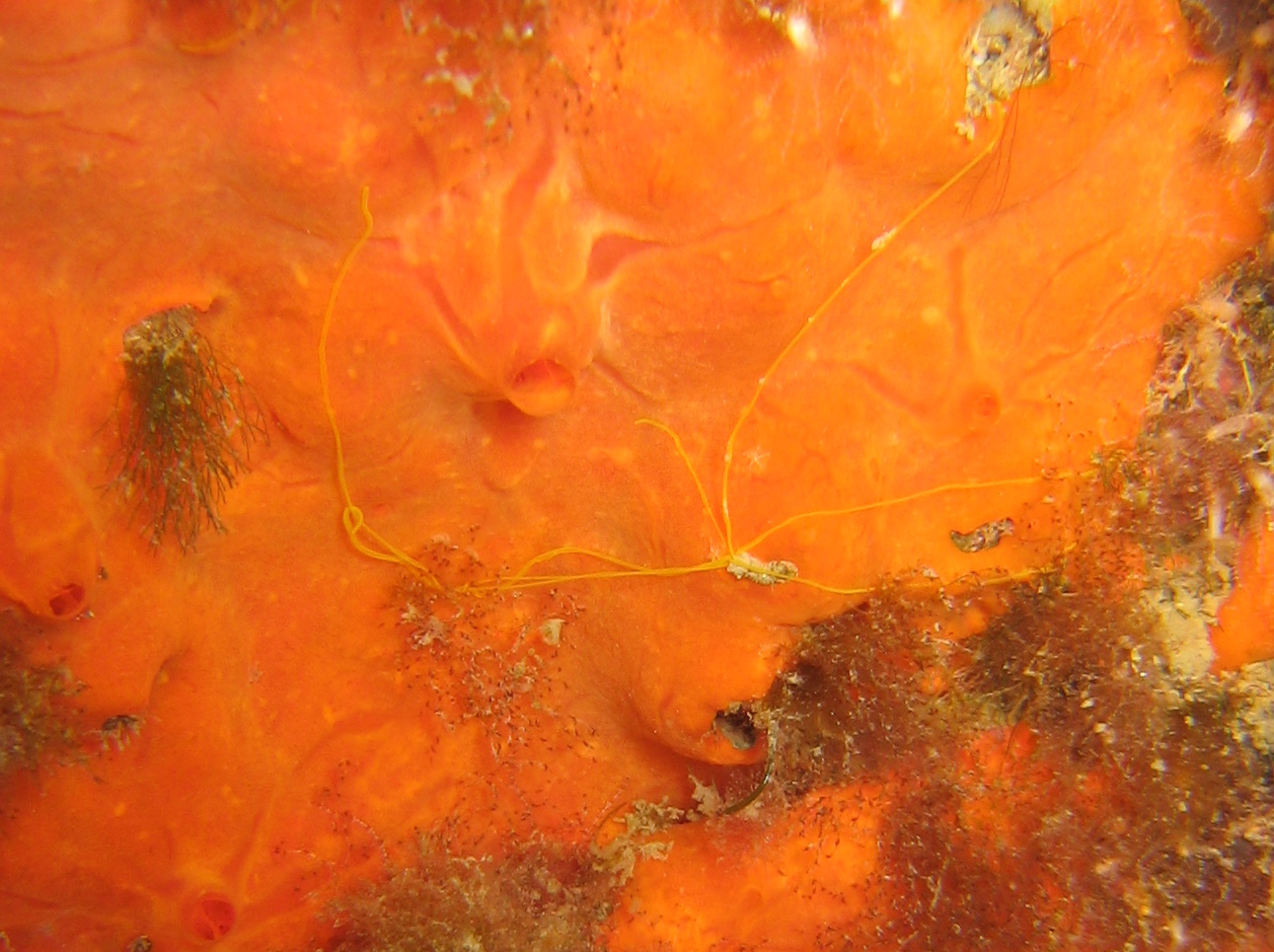
Eupolymnia nebulosa

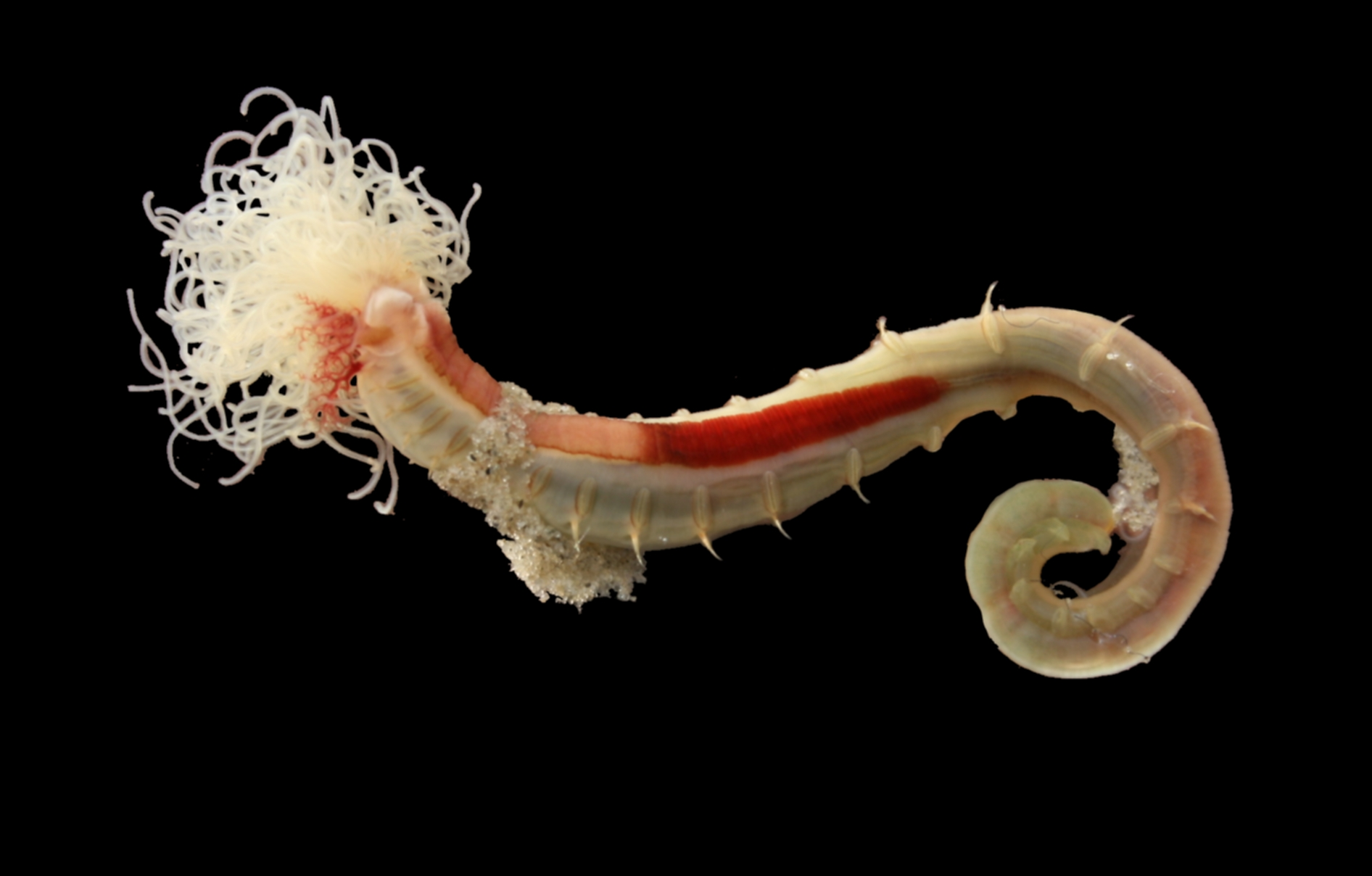
Lanice conchilega

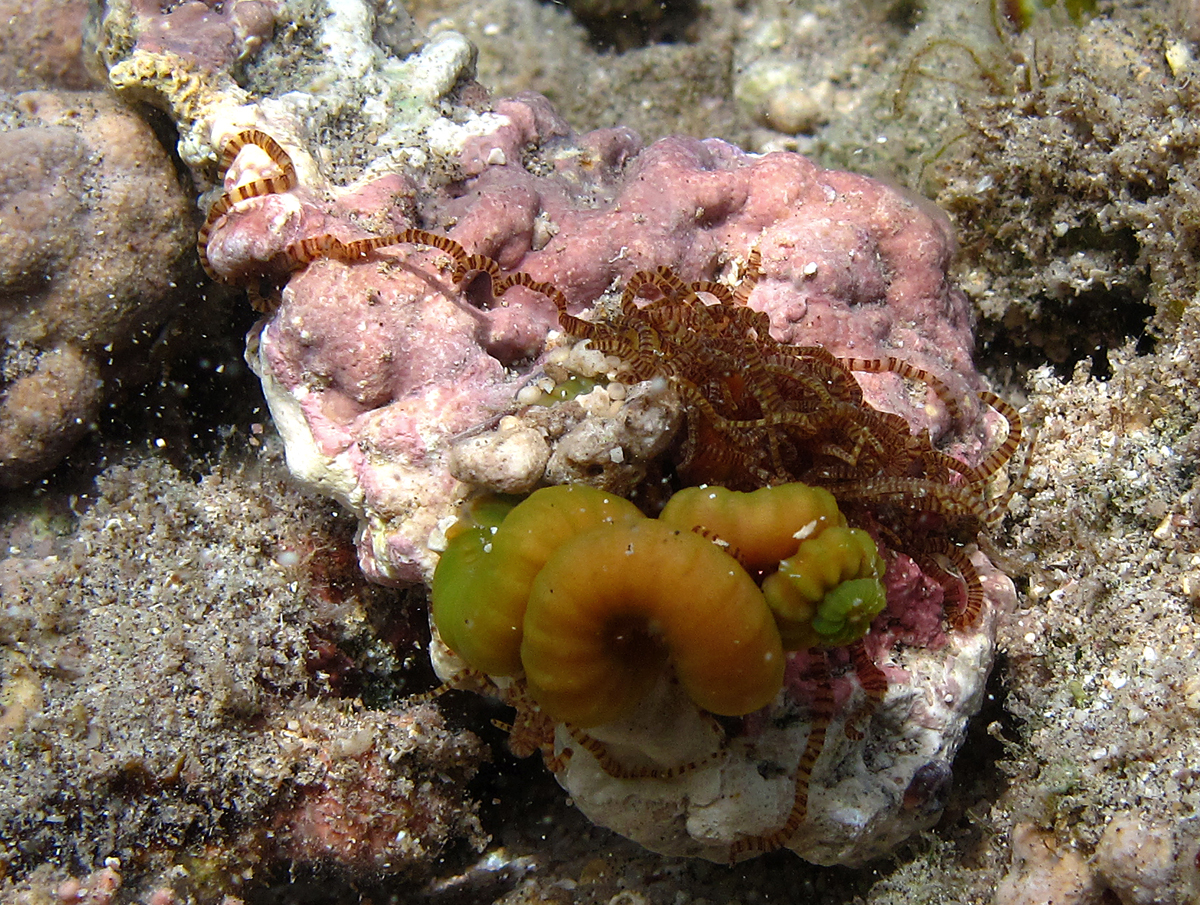
Loima sp.

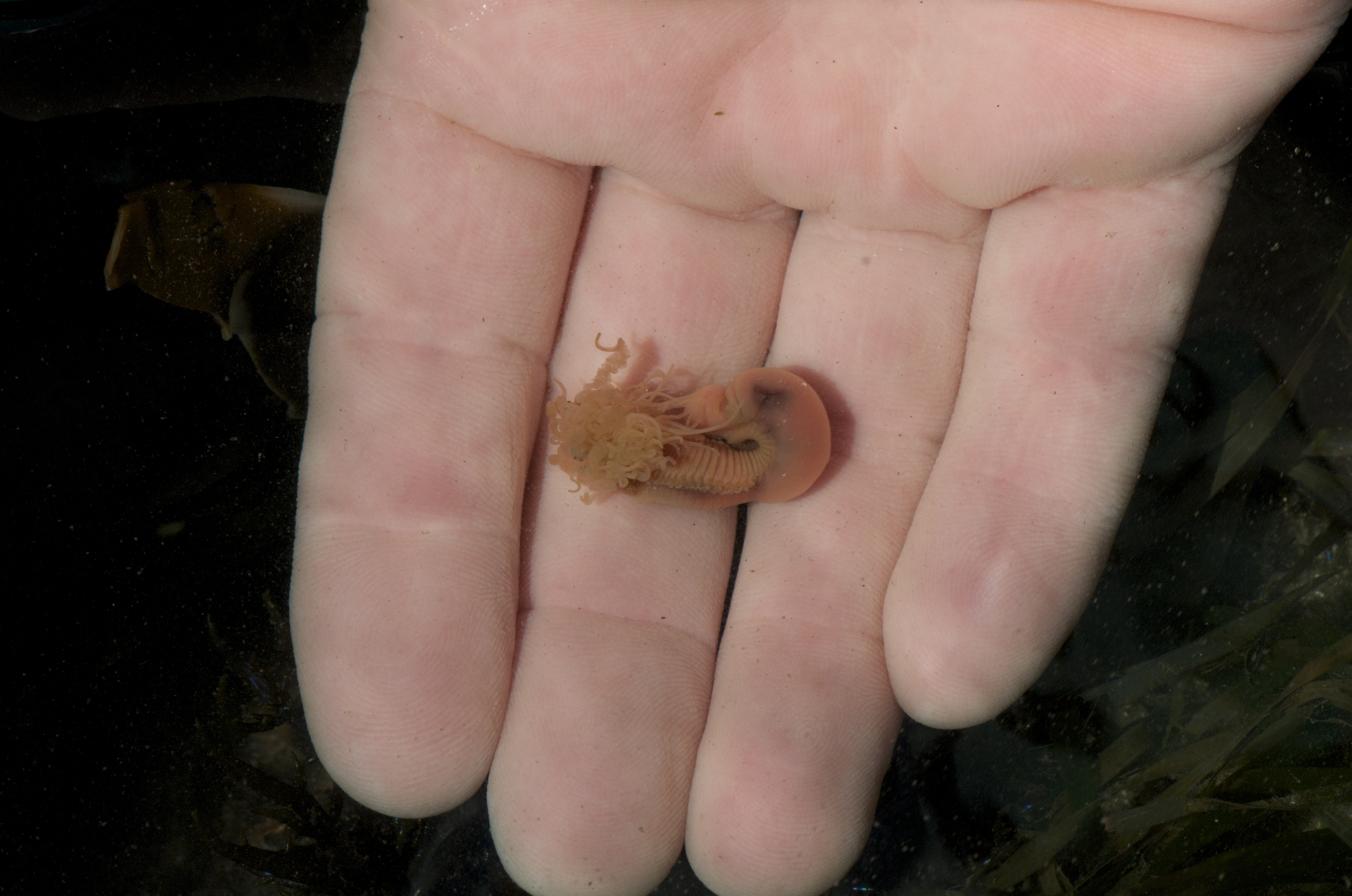
Thelepus cincinnatus
