= Marphysa tompaulingi =

Scientific classification
- Kingdom: Animalia
- Phylum: Annelida
- Clade: Pleistoannelida
- Subclass: Errantia
- Order: Eunicida
- Family: Eunicidae
- Genus: Marphysa
- Species: M. tompaulingi

Binomial name
- Marphysa tompaulingi Glasby, Biriukova, Hutchings, Daffe & Lavesque, 2025

Species of annelid worm

Marphysa tompaulingi is a species of annelid worm in the family Eunicidae. It is endemic to the islands of the Northern Territory, Australia, where it has currently only been identified from the mid-channel of the Ludmilla Creek, East Point Reserve, Darwin.

== Description ==
The species is crimson coloured (iridescent on the top side and lighter red on the underside, with contrasting red branchial filaments) and has cream-coloured prostomial appendages. The holotype measures 98 mm (3.9 in) long, with a 4 mm (0.16 in) width at chaetiger 10. It can be differentiated from M. iloiloensis and M. setiuensis by being more robust, and by lacking a pair of eyes or a shallow notch on the anteroventral margin of the first peristomial ring.

== Taxonomy ==
The species was first described by Christopher J. Glasby, Olga Biriukova, Pat A. Hutchings, Guillemine Daffe and Nicolas Lavesque in 2025. The authors named the species after Australian lawyer Tom Pauling, the former Administrator of the Northern Territory, whose family home is located close to the type locality.

== Distribution and habitat ==
M. tompaulingi is endemic to the Northern Territory, Australia, where it is currently only known to occur in the mid-channel of the brackish mouth of the Ludmilla Creek, East Point Reserve, in Darwin. M. mossambica, also found at the Ludmilla Creek mouth, is known to live in a different habitat, mangrove sediments, rotting timber and Rhizophora stylosa roots.
