= Marphysa yunbenun =

Scientific classification
- Kingdom: Animalia
- Phylum: Annelida
- Clade: Pleistoannelida
- Subclass: Errantia
- Order: Eunicida
- Family: Eunicidae
- Genus: Marphysa
- Species: M. yunbenun

Binomial name
- Marphysa yunbenun Glasby, Biriukova, Hutchings, Daffe & Lavesque, 2025

Species of annelid worm

Marphysa yunbenun is a species of annelid worm in the family Eunicidae. It is endemic to the islands of the Great Barrier Reef, including Magnetic Island, in Queensland, Australia.

== Description ==
The species has a strongly bilobed prostomium. It can be distinguished from M. kertehensis due to its sub-acicular hooks, and from M. mossambica due to having only two types of pectinate chaetae (compared to four seen in both M. kertehensis and M. mossambica) and due to its peristomal ring being four times longer dorsally than the second ring (compared to 2.3x longer in M. mossambica).

== Taxonomy ==
The species was first described by Christopher J. Glasby, Olga Biriukova, Pat A. Hutchings, Guillemine Daffe and Nicolas Lavesque in 2025. The authors named the species after the Wulguru language name for Magnetic Island, Yunbenun.

== Distribution and habitat ==
M. yunbenun is known to occur on Magnetic Island in the Great Barrier Reef, Queensland, Australia, where it lives in mud flats. A specimen collected in 1931 by Monro from the Low Isles, Queensland may also represent a member of this species.
