= Lysidice =

Lysidice may refer to:

== Feminine name ==
- Lysidice (mythology) (Λυσιδίκη), the name of several minor Greek mythological figures

== Genera ==
- Lysidice (plant), a plant genus in the family Fabaceae
- Lysidice (annelid), an animal genus in the family Eunicidae
