= Palolo =

Palolo may refer to:

- Palolo, Hawaii, a valley and neighborhood of Honolulu, Hawaii
- Palolo, a district of Sigi Regency, Central Sulawesi, Indonesia
- Palolo worm, a species of invertebrate that lives in tropical coral reefs

== See also ==
- Palola (genus of polychaetes)
