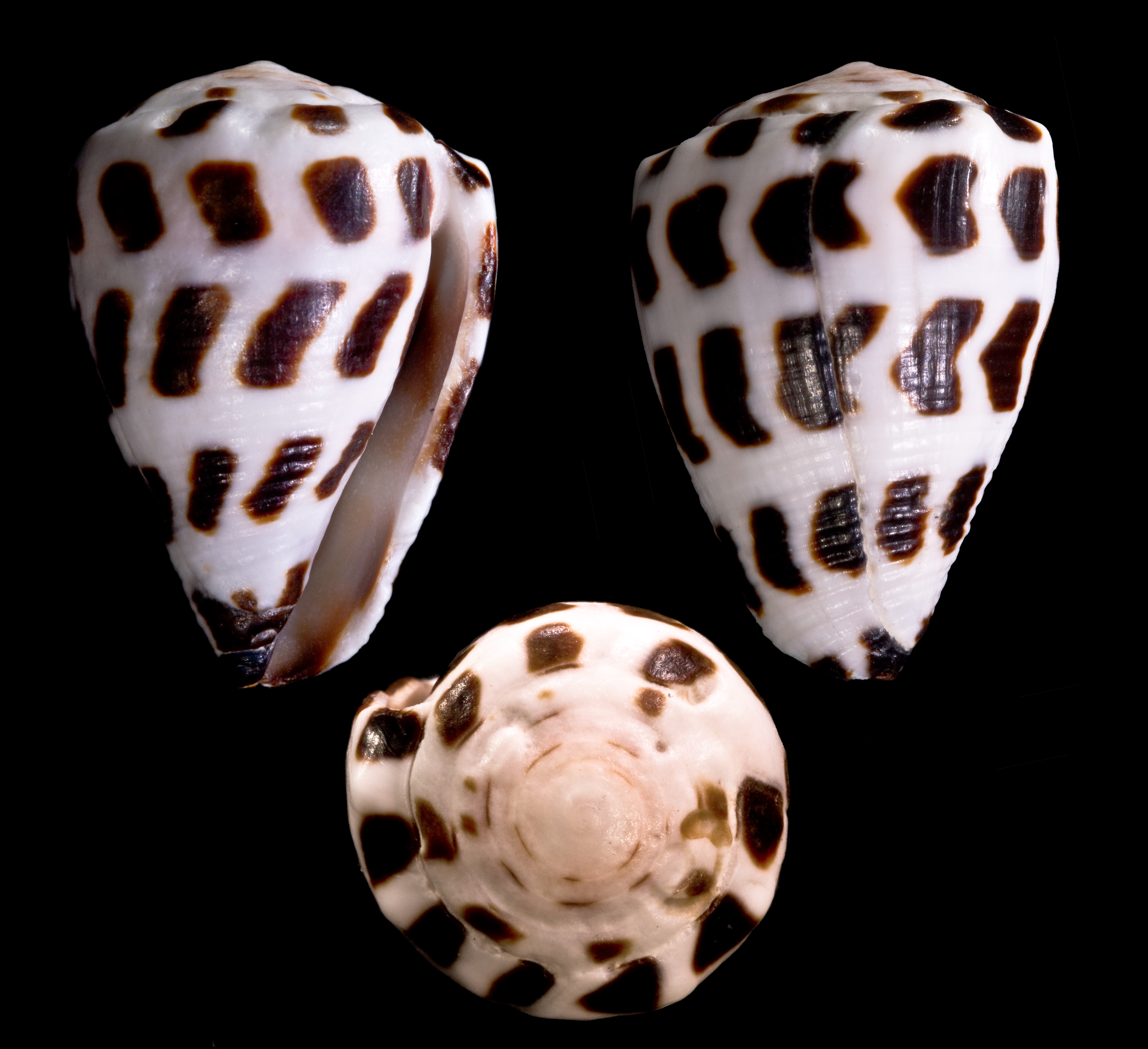
- Three different views of a shell of Conus ebraeus

Conservation status
- Least Concern (IUCN 3.1)

Scientific classification
- Kingdom: Animalia
- Phylum: Mollusca
- Class: Gastropoda
- Subclass: Caenogastropoda
- Order: Neogastropoda
- Superfamily: Conoidea
- Family: Conidae
- Genus: Conus
- Species: C. ebraeus

Binomial name
- Conus ebraeus Linnaeus, 1758

Synonyms
- Conus (Virroconus) ebraeus Linnaeus, 1758 accepted, alternate representation; Conus quadratus Perry, 1811; Virroconus ebraeus (Linnaeus, 1758)

= Conus ebraeus =

Species of sea snail

Conus ebraeus, common name the black-and-white cone or Hebrew cone, is a species of sea snail, a marine gastropod mollusk in the family Conidae, the cone snails and their allies.

== Description ==
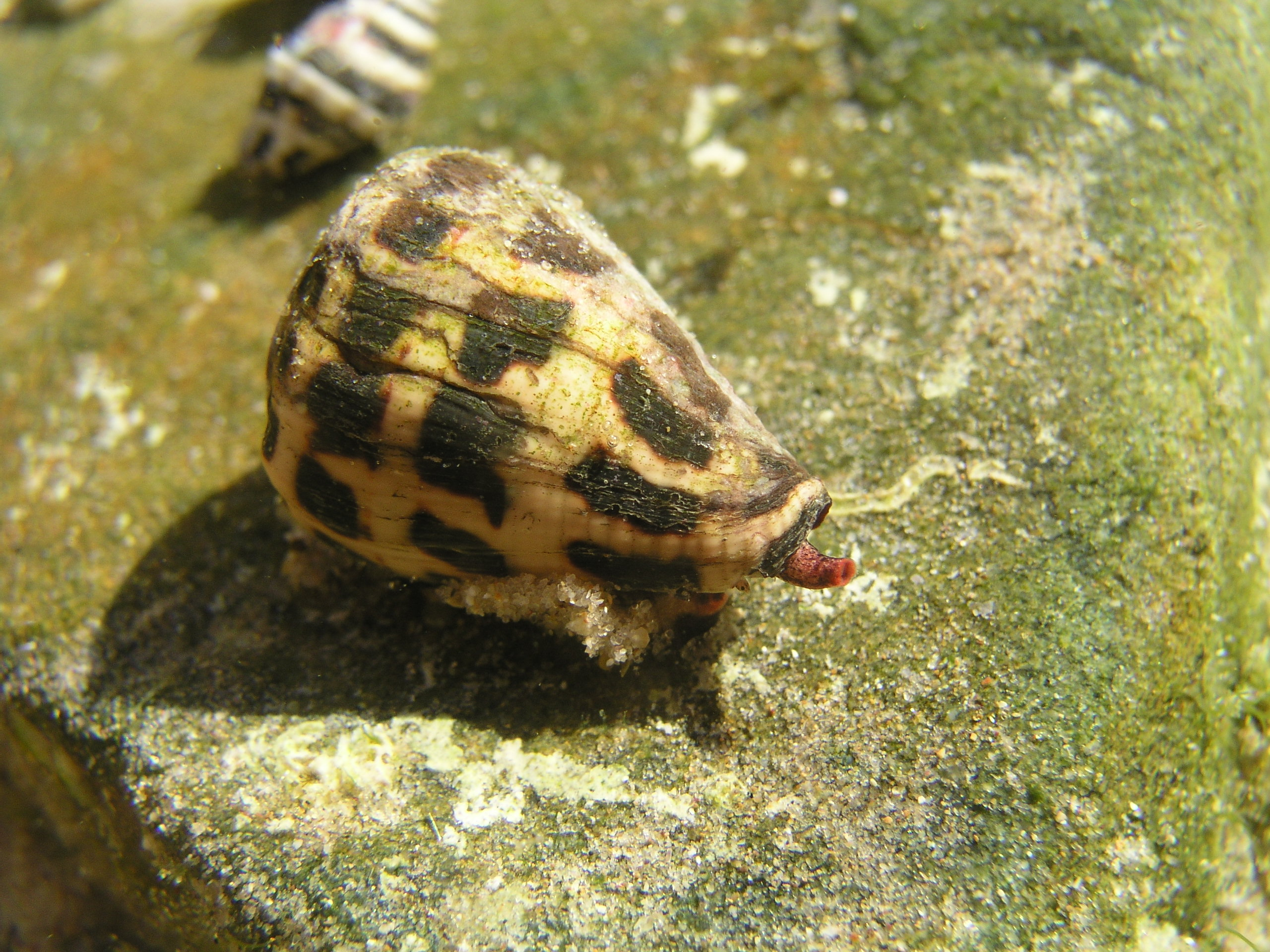

The height of the shell varies from 25 mm to 62 mm. The width of the shell of type specimen is 19 mm. The height of the shell of type specimen is 28 mm.

Conus ebraeus has an easily recognisable small, squat shell, with a rounded, short spire.

The shell is white, with a pattern of blackish squares, sometimes rose-tinted, with three or four revolving bands composed of irregular longitudinal dark chocolate or nearly black markings; these markings also ornament the slightly coronated spire. The aperture is white with clouded bands corresponding with the exterior markings. The surface is more or less striate throughout, but striae are more prominent towards the dark stained base.

This species is extremely similar to Conus judaeus. The two are best distinguished by close examination of the radular teeth.

== Distribution ==
Conus ebraeus is one of the most widely distributed members of its genus and occurs in shallow water, tropical regions throughout the Indo-West and eastern Pacific, from the Red Sea to the shores of the Americas.

The type locality is India.

Localities include:

- Aldabra
- Chagos
- Guam
- Hawaii
- Houtman Abrolhos
- Kenya
- Madagascar
- Mascarene Basin
- Mozambique
- Okinawa
- Papua New Guinea
- Red Sea
- Tanzania
- Taiwan
- West Coast of South Africa

== Habitat ==
Conus ebraeus lives near rocky shores, lower eulittoral, often under boulders.

== Feeding habits ==
Like all species within the genus Conus, these snails are predatory and venomous. They are capable of stinging humans, therefore live ones should be handled carefully or not at all.

While the focal prey of Conus ebraeus are eunicid polychaetes (i.e., members of the genus Palola) at most locations in the Indo-West Pacific (e.g., the Maldives, eastern Indian Ocean, Great Barrier Reef, Okinawa and Guam), at Hawaii and the Seychelles this species predominantly preys on nereid polychaetes. These results suggest that Conus ebraeus exhibits geographic variation in dietary specialization.

Prey of Conus ebraeus include Perinereis helleri (family Nereididae), Palola sp., Eunice cariboea and Lysidice collaris (all three from family Eunicidae).

== Gallery ==
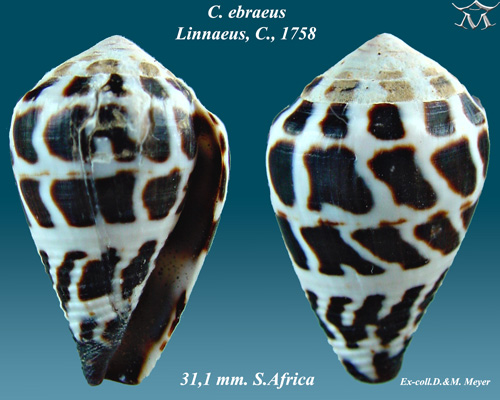
Conus ebraeus Linnaeus, C., 1758

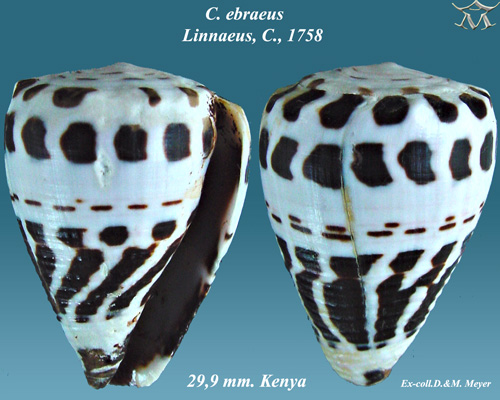
Conus ebraeus Linnaeus, C., 1758

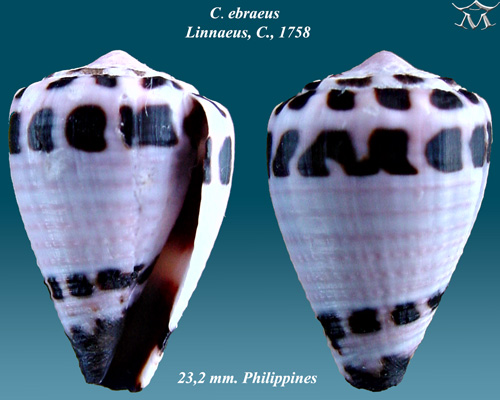
Conus ebraeus Linnaeus, C., 1758

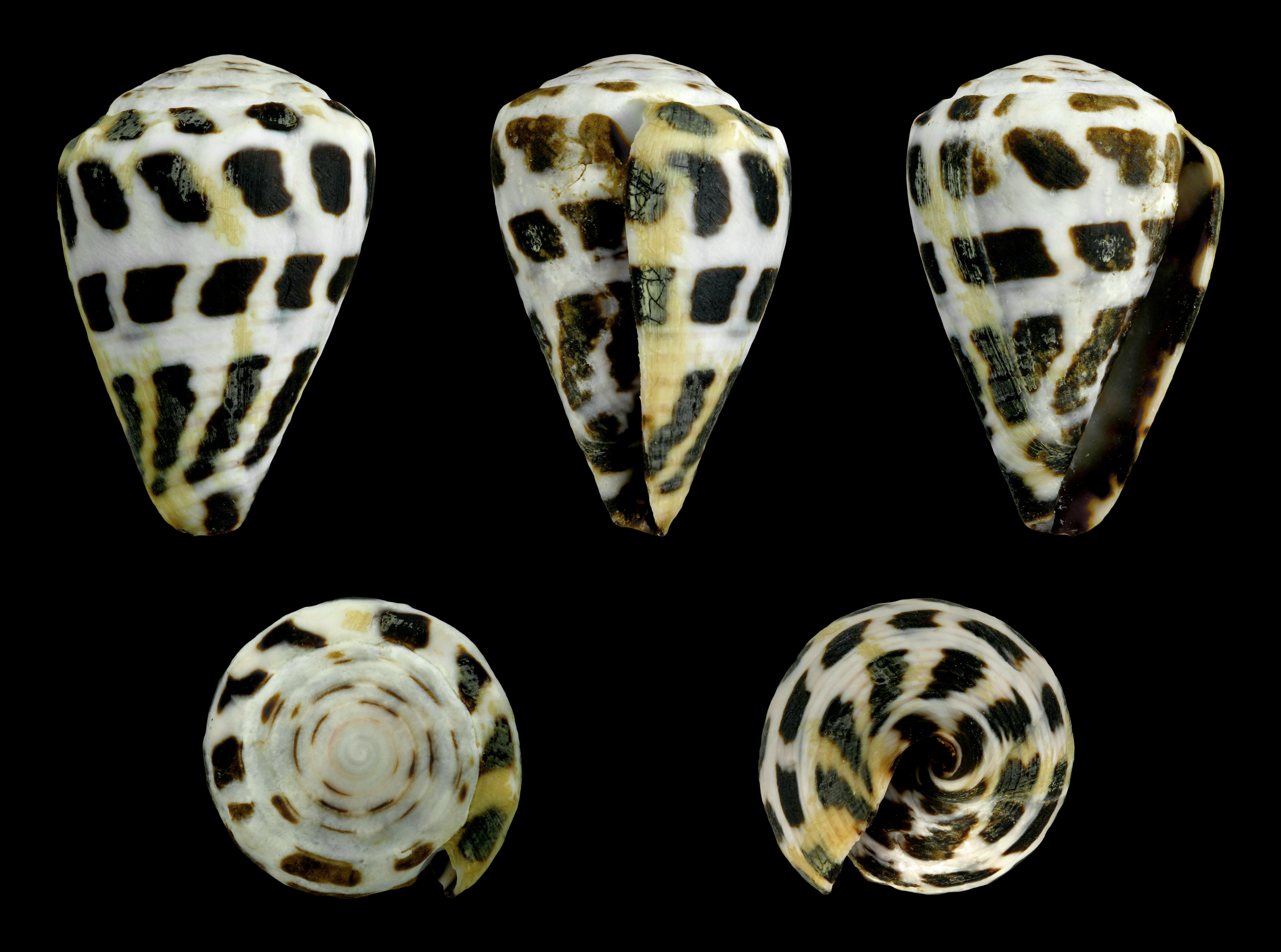
Conus ebraeus Linnaeus, C., 1758

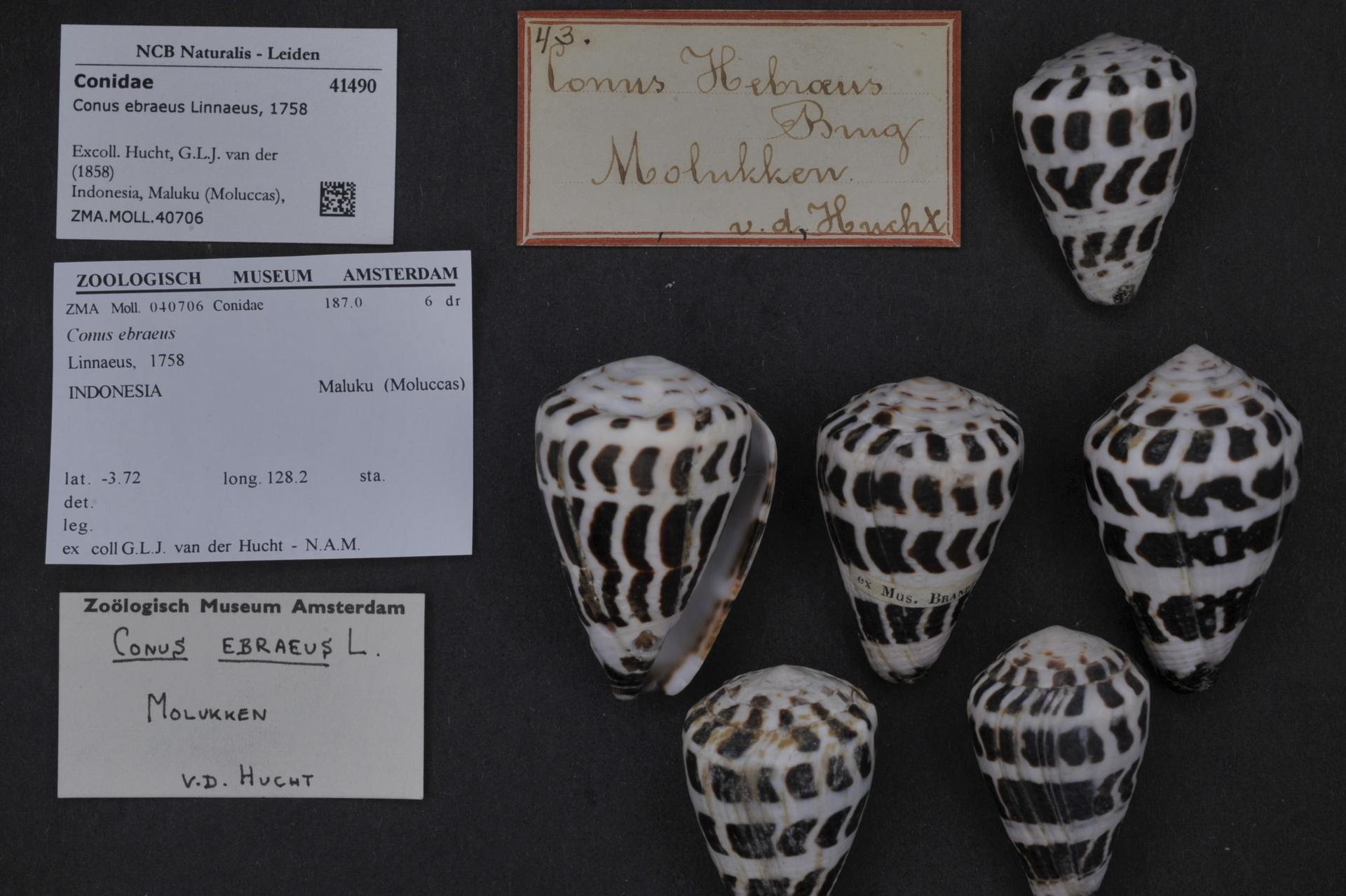
Conus ebraeus Linnaeus, C., 1758. Museum specimens
