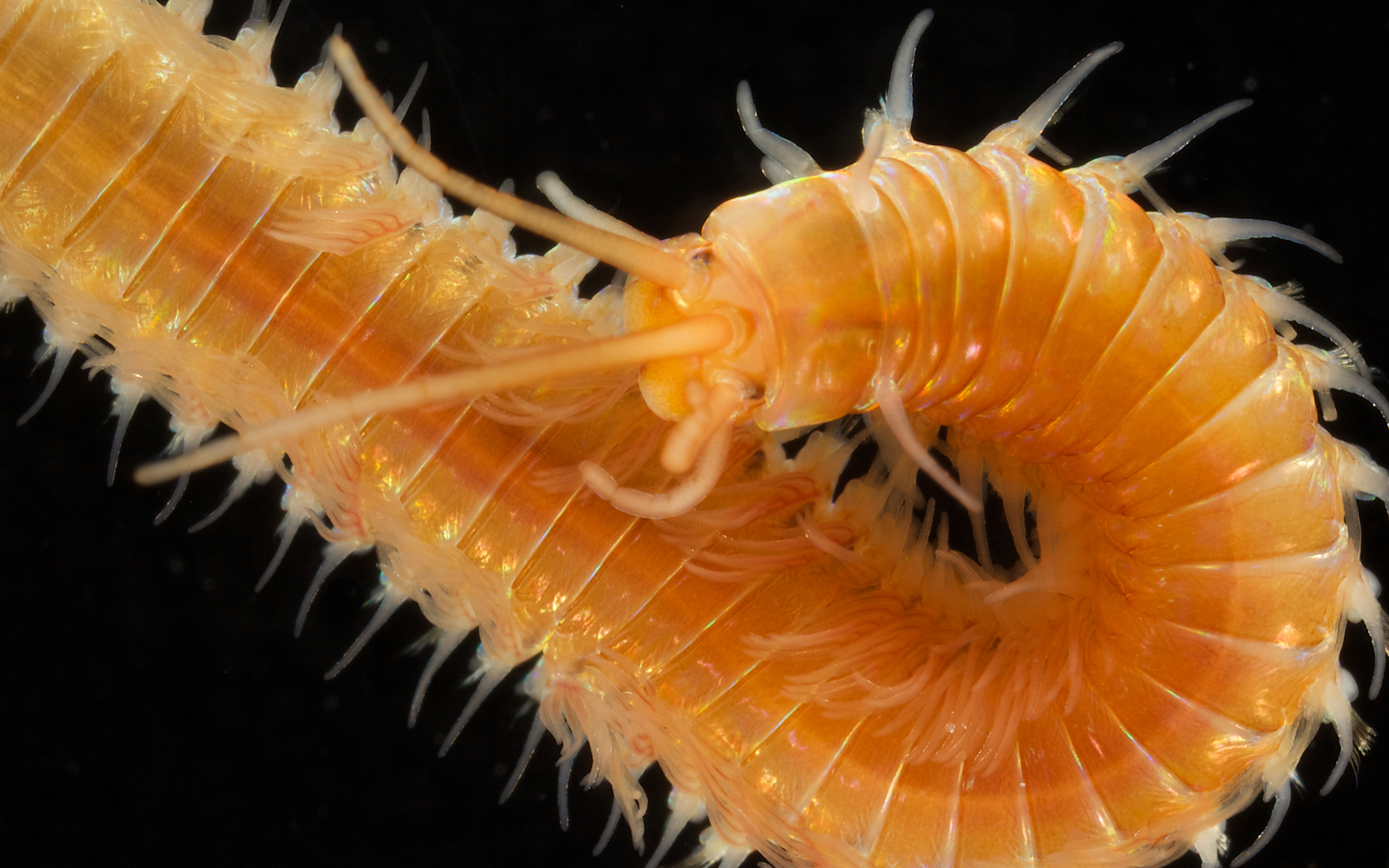

Scientific classification
- Domain: Eukaryota
- Kingdom: Animalia
- Phylum: Annelida
- Clade: Pleistoannelida
- Subclass: Errantia
- Order: Eunicida
- Family: Eunicidae
- Genus: Eunice
- Species: E. pennata

Binomial name
- Eunice pennata (Müller, 1776)

= Eunice pennata =

Species of polychaete worm

Eunice pennata is a species of polychaete worm within the family Eunicidae. The species has a cosmopolitan distribution, mainly being found in subtropical to polar regions of oceans at depths of 813 to 1064 meters. Areas the species has the most observations include waters around Scandinavia, New England, southern Argentina and Chile, and the South Georgia and the South Sandwich Islands. Individuals can reach lengths up to 150 millimeters with a width of 8 millimeters.
