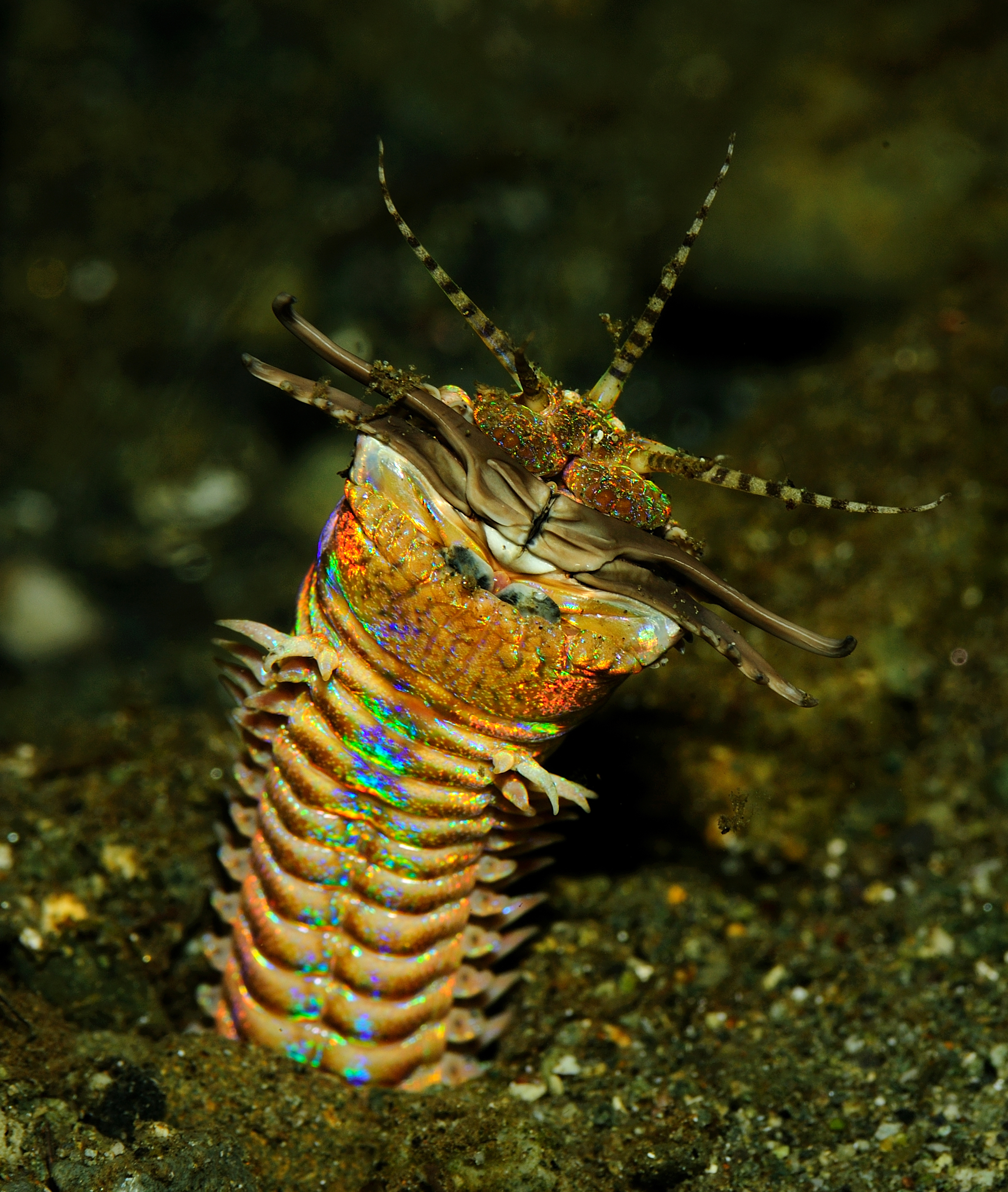
- A burrowed Eunice aphroditois

Scientific classification
- Kingdom: Animalia
- Phylum: Annelida
- Clade: Pleistoannelida
- Subclass: Errantia
- Order: Eunicida
- Family: Eunicidae
- Genus: Eunice
- Species: E. aphroditois

Binomial name
- Eunice aphroditois Pallas, 1788

= Eunice aphroditois =

Species of worm

Eunice aphroditois is a benthic bristle worm of warm marine waters. It lives mainly in the Atlantic Ocean, but can also be found in the Indo-Pacific. It ranges in length from less than 10 cm (4 in) to nearly 3 m (10 ft). Its exoskeleton displays a wide range of colors, from black to purple and more. This species is an ambush predator; it hunts by burrowing its whole body in soft sediment on the ocean floor and waiting until its antennae detect prey. It then strikes with its sharp mandibles. It may also be found among coral reefs.

The species is called the sand striker or trap-jaw worm. Traces of their burrows have been found among fossils near Taiwan dating back 20 million years. A highly popularized name is bobbit worm or bobbitt worm, which is believed to derive from the John and Lorena Bobbitt case.

== Description ==
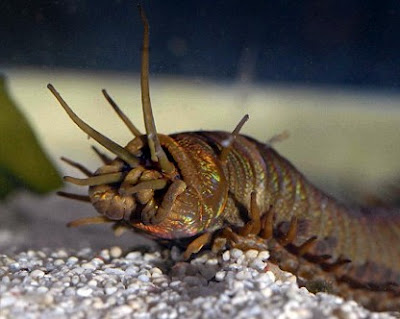
Head with antennae

External videos
- Watch a bobbit worm strike its prey Science News

These ambush predators have five antennae on their head that are used to sense prey. The body is covered by a hard exoskeleton. The mandibles can be retracted inside the body and are responsible for striking and stunning prey; they are capable of snapping some prey in half.

Typically, E. aphroditois ranges from deep purple to black, with an iridescent skin. The largest known specimen on record reached 299 cm (9.81 ft) in length, making it the longest known member of the polychaete class. Despite these great lengths, the worms are slim, with the body only about 25.5 mm (1.00 in) wide.

== Habitat ==
This species may be found prowling in prey-rich coral reefs, where its coloration allows it to blend in and its slim body enables it to hunt in tight places. It inhabits a wide range of other habitats, particularly sandy and muddy sediments, as well as around rocks and sponges. It has been recorded at depths of up to 95 meters (312 ft).

=== Diet and interactions ===
Eunice aphroditois senses passing prey with its antennae, seizes the prey with its mandibles, and drags it into its burrow. This species is considered not only a carnivore, feeding on a plethora of species of fish, but also an herbivore or omnivore, feeding on algae, as well as a decomposer, feeding on dead and decaying matter.

To reduce predation risk, some fish engage in mobbing behavior, during which a group of fish will direct jets of water into the worm's burrow to disorient it. Ancestral species may have exhibited the same hunting behavior 20 million years ago, according to fossil records.

== Life cycle ==
Eunice aphroditois's sexual reproduction organs have not been fully studied, so there is no clear understanding of how it reproduces, though its reproduction might be similar to that of polychaetes. The lifespan of E. aphroditois is believed to be three to five years.

=== Regeneration and reproduction ===
E. aphroditois is capable of limited regeneration, primarily of posterior segments (such as the tail), a common trait among many polychaete worms. While some annelids can regenerate body parts after injury, there is no scientific evidence that E. aphroditois reproduces asexually by splitting into multiple segments. Reports of such behavior appear to stem from misinterpretations of post-mortem or injury-induced movement, rather than verified regenerative reproduction.

E. aphroditois reproduces sexually. During spawning, individuals release sperm and eggs into the water column, where external fertilization occurs. The resulting embryos develop into planktonic trochophore larvae, which drift before settling and metamorphosing into juvenile worms. This mode of reproduction is consistent with many other members of the order Eunicida.

== Aquaculture ==
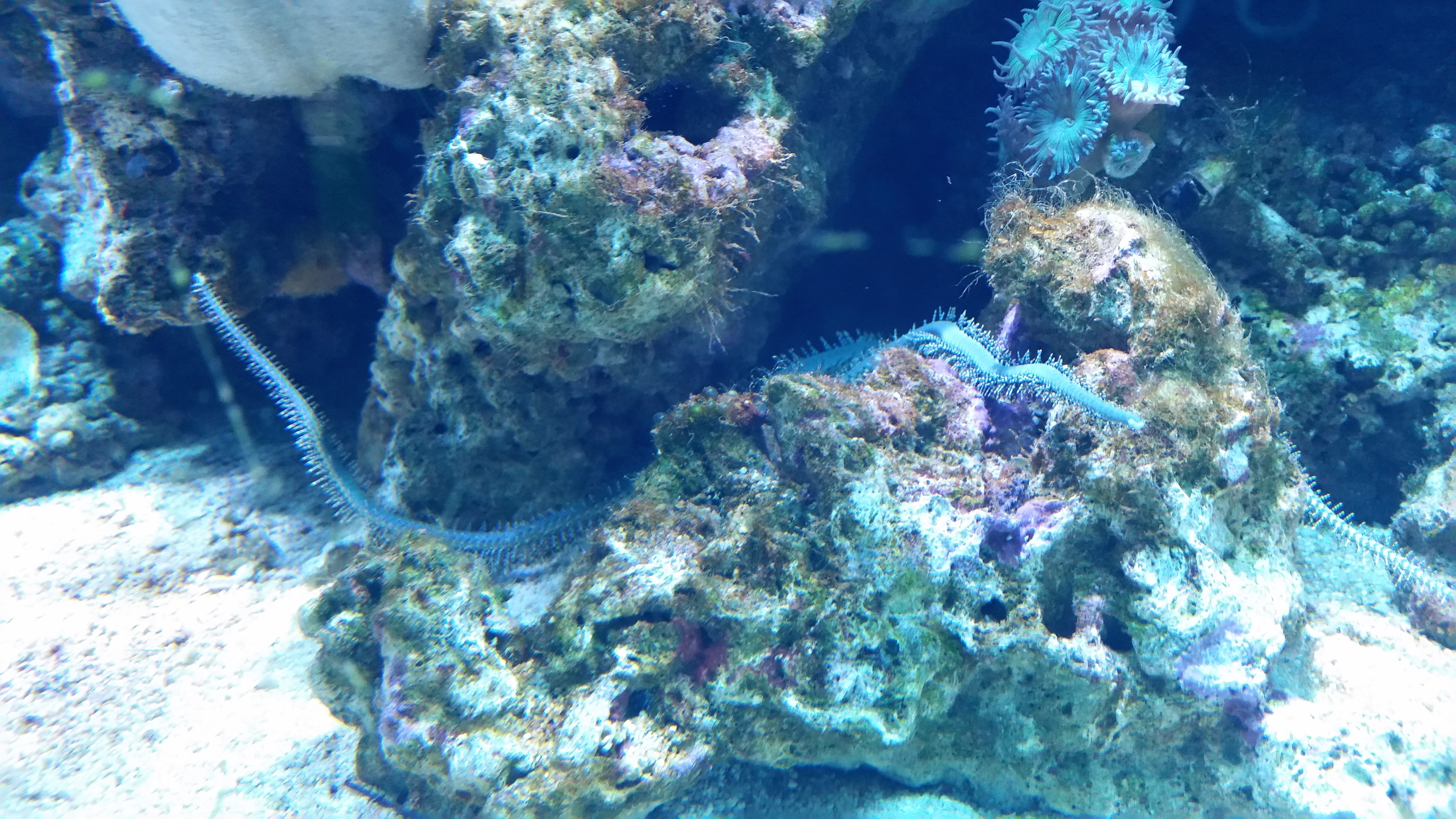
In an aquarium, showing length

While not commonly kept in aquaculture, individuals of E. aphroditois are occasionally found in home aquaria, where smaller specimens can evade detection by being transported into the tank in live rocks, where they then grow in size. As E. aphroditois hunts fish, it will deplete the aquarium's stock by direct predation.

E. aphroditois can be difficult to remove from aquariums due to its ability to dig holes into rocks, and to curl up and hide in small rocks and substrate despite its length.

== Fossil record ==
Fossil burrows from the Miocene of northeastern Taiwan have been likened to those of E. aphroditois. The burrows, classified in the ichnogenus Pennichnus, have been found preserved in fine-grained sandstone. They are L-shaped and can reach up to 2 metres (6 ft 7 in) in length, with a vertical section covered in feather-like collapse structures comprising around 40% of the burrow length, connected by a short intermediate section to a horizontal section accounting for 50% of the length. The burrows are on average 2.5 centimetres (0.98 in) wide at the entrance, and taper down to 2 centimetres (0.79 in) at the end of the horizontal section.
