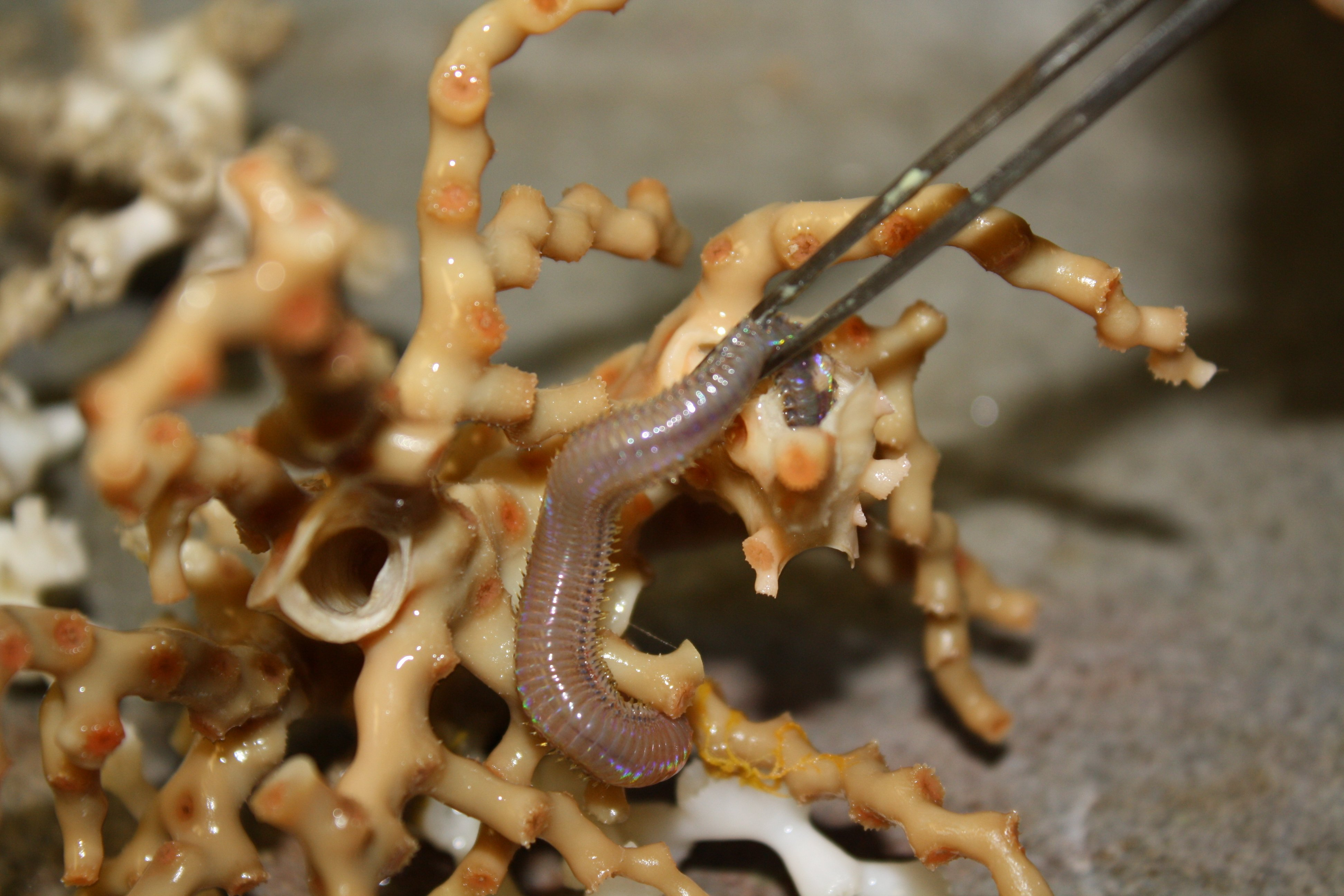

Scientific classification
- Kingdom: Animalia
- Phylum: Annelida
- Clade: Pleistoannelida
- Subclass: Errantia
- Order: Eunicida
- Family: Eunicidae
- Genus: Eunice
- Species: E. norvegica

Binomial name
- Eunice norvegica (Linnaeus, 1767)

Synonyms
- Eunice gunneri Storm, 1879; Leodice gunneri Storm, 1881; Nereis madreporae pertusae Gunnerus, 1768; Nereis norvegica Linnaeus, 1767

= Eunice norvegica =

Species of annelid worm

Eunice norvegica is an aquatic polychaete worm found in deep water on the seabed of the northern Atlantic Ocean as well as in the Pacific and Indian Oceans. It is a tubeworm and is often associated with deep water corals.

== Description ==
Eunice norvegica can grow to a length of about 20 cm (8 in), and is pink, brownish or black with some brown spotting. The prostomium, the front-most segment, is slightly lobed and bears two eyes and five antennae. The peristomium, the adjoining segment. is about four times as long as the prostomium. The remaining segments each bear a pair of parapodia and several bristles.

== Distribution and habitat ==
The species is found in the northern Atlantic Ocean, the Mediterranean Sea, the North Sea, the Skagerrak and probably the Øresund, as well as in the Indian and Pacific Oceans. In general, it inhabits an irregularly bent, sometimes branching, parchment-like tube partially embedded in soft sediment such as sand, muddy sand, mud, gravel, broken shell or fragments of coral. The tube has extra openings at the bends. Its depth range is from 20 to 1,300 m (100 to 4,300 ft).

== Ecology ==
Eunice norvegica is an omnivore, predator and scavenger. It often lives in association with deep water corals such as Lophelia pertusa. Other branching corals with which it associates include Madrepore and Solenosmilia. The worm wraps its tube around branches of the coral and this stimulates the coral to produce extra skeletal material which may overgrow the worm's tube. This extra growth probably strengthens the coral and at the same time provides protection for the worm. It appears to be a mutualistic arrangement, the worm sometimes stealing food particles from the coral polyps, but also helping keep the coral surface clear of sediment.
