= Marphysa iloiloensis =

Scientific classification
- Domain: Eukaryota
- Kingdom: Animalia
- Phylum: Annelida
- Clade: Pleistoannelida
- Subclass: Errantia
- Order: Eunicida
- Family: Eunicidae
- Genus: Marphysa
- Species: M. iloiloensis

Binomial name
- Marphysa iloiloensis Glasby et al., 2019

Species of annelid worm

Marphysa iloiloensis is a mudworm known for its behavior in cleaning soil in fishponds identified in and named after the province of Iloilo of the Philippines. The species was listed at the World Register of Marine Species in September 2019. In Iloilo it is locally known as ulod-ulod.

The mudworm species was identified as distinct from other mudworms by a team of researchers at the Southeast Asian Fisheries Development Center (SEAFDC) led by Australian taxonomist Christopher Glasby. Filipino researcher Mary Anne Mandario was responsible for collecting samples of the species from SEAFDC's fishponds in Dumangas and is reportedly developing a reliable culture technique for Marphysa iloiloensis.
