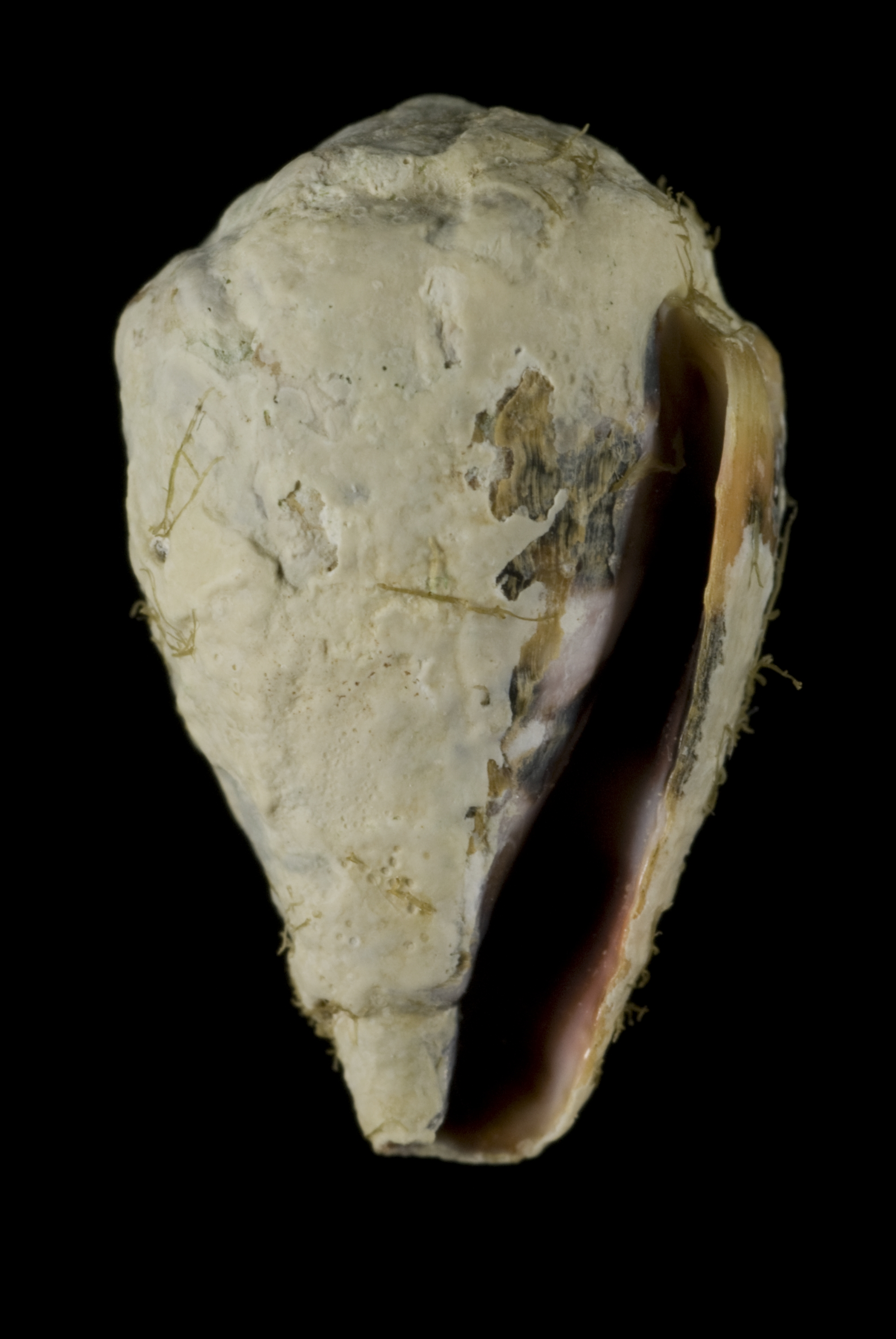
- Shell of Conus judaeus (specimen at MNHN, Paris)

Conservation status
- Least Concern (IUCN 3.1)

Scientific classification
- Kingdom: Animalia
- Phylum: Mollusca
- Class: Gastropoda
- Subclass: Caenogastropoda
- Order: Neogastropoda
- Superfamily: Conoidea
- Family: Conidae
- Genus: Conus
- Species: C. judaeus

Binomial name
- Conus judaeus Bergh, 1895

Synonyms
- Conus (Virroconus) judaeus Bergh, 1895 accepted, alternate representation; Virroconus judaeus (Bergh, 1895)

= Conus judaeus =

Species of sea snail

Conus judaeus is a species of sea snail, a marine gastropod mollusk in the family Conidae, the cone snails and their allies.

Like all species within the genus Conus, these snails are predatory and venomous. They are capable of stinging humans, therefore live ones should be handled carefully or not at all.

== Description ==
The size of the shell attains 32 mm (1.3 in).

This species is extremely similar to Conus ebraeus. The two are best distinguished by close examination of the radular teeth.

== Distribution ==
This marine species occurs off the Philippines and Papua New Guinea.
