= Lysidice brevicalyx =

Scientific classification
- Kingdom: Plantae
- Clade: Tracheophytes
- Clade: Angiosperms
- Clade: Eudicots
- Clade: Rosids
- Order: Fabales
- Family: Fabaceae
- Genus: Lysidice
- Species: L. brevicalyx

Binomial name
- Lysidice brevicalyx Wei

Species of legume

Lysidice brevicalyx is a tree species in the genus Lysidice, endemic to China. It is a 10–20 m (33–66 ft) tall forest tree that grows in southern China (Guangdong, Guangxi, Guizhou, and Yunnan provinces). It contains stilbenoid glycosides.
