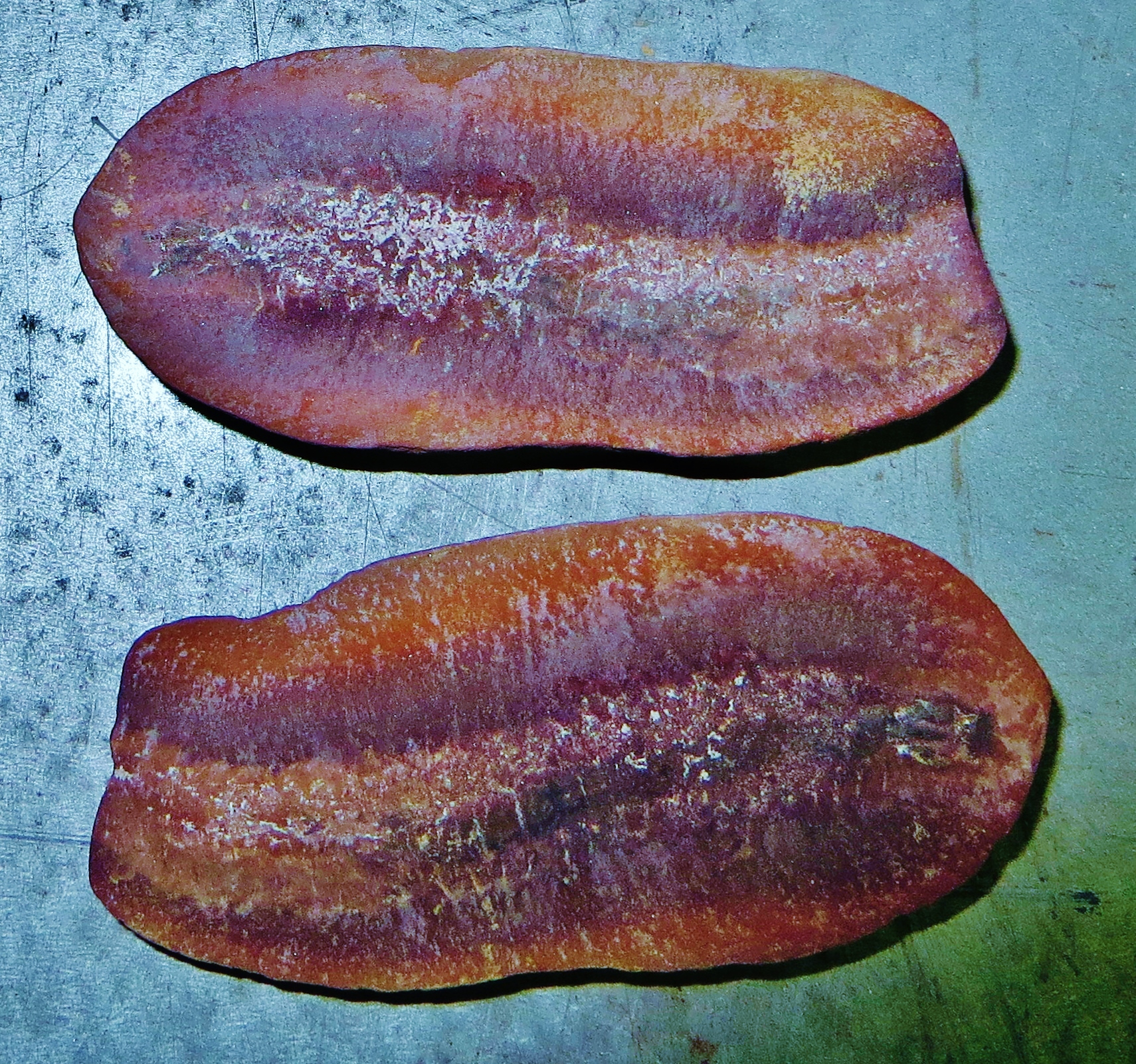

Scientific classification
- Kingdom: Animalia
- Phylum: Annelida
- Clade: Pleistoannelida
- Subclass: Errantia
- Order: Eunicida
- Family: Eunicidae
- Genus: †Esconites
- Species: †E. zelus

Binomial name
- †Esconites zelus Thompson & Johnson 1977

= Esconites =

Esconites Temporal range: Carboniferous

Extinct genus of annelid worms

Esconites is a genus of eunicid polychaete known from concretions in the Carboniferous Mazon Creek biota (Essex fauna).

It reaches 4–14 cm in length and has 23-80 segments and distinctive jaw elements.
