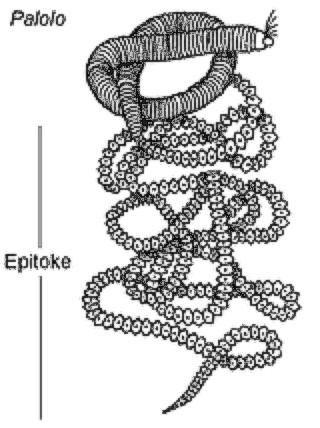

Conservation status
- Data Deficient (IUCN 2.3)

Scientific classification
- Kingdom: Animalia
- Phylum: Annelida
- Clade: Pleistoannelida
- Subclass: Errantia
- Order: Eunicida
- Family: Eunicidae
- Genus: Palola
- Species: P. viridis

Binomial name
- Palola viridis (Gray, 1840)

Synonyms
- Leodice viridis Lamarck, 1818; Lysidice palola Quatrefages, 1866; Palolo viridis Gray in Stair, 1847 (misspelling); Eunice viridis

= Palola viridis =

Species of invertebrate in the family Eunicidae

Palola viridis (or Eunice viridis), commonly known as the palolo worm, Samoan palolo worm, balolo, wawo, or nyale, is a Polychaeta species from the waters of some of the Pacific islands, including Samoa, Tonga, Fiji, Vanuatu, the Solomon Islands, Papua New Guinea, and the islands of the maritime Southeast Asia (which are part of Indonesia, Timor-Leste and the Philippines).

== Life cycle ==
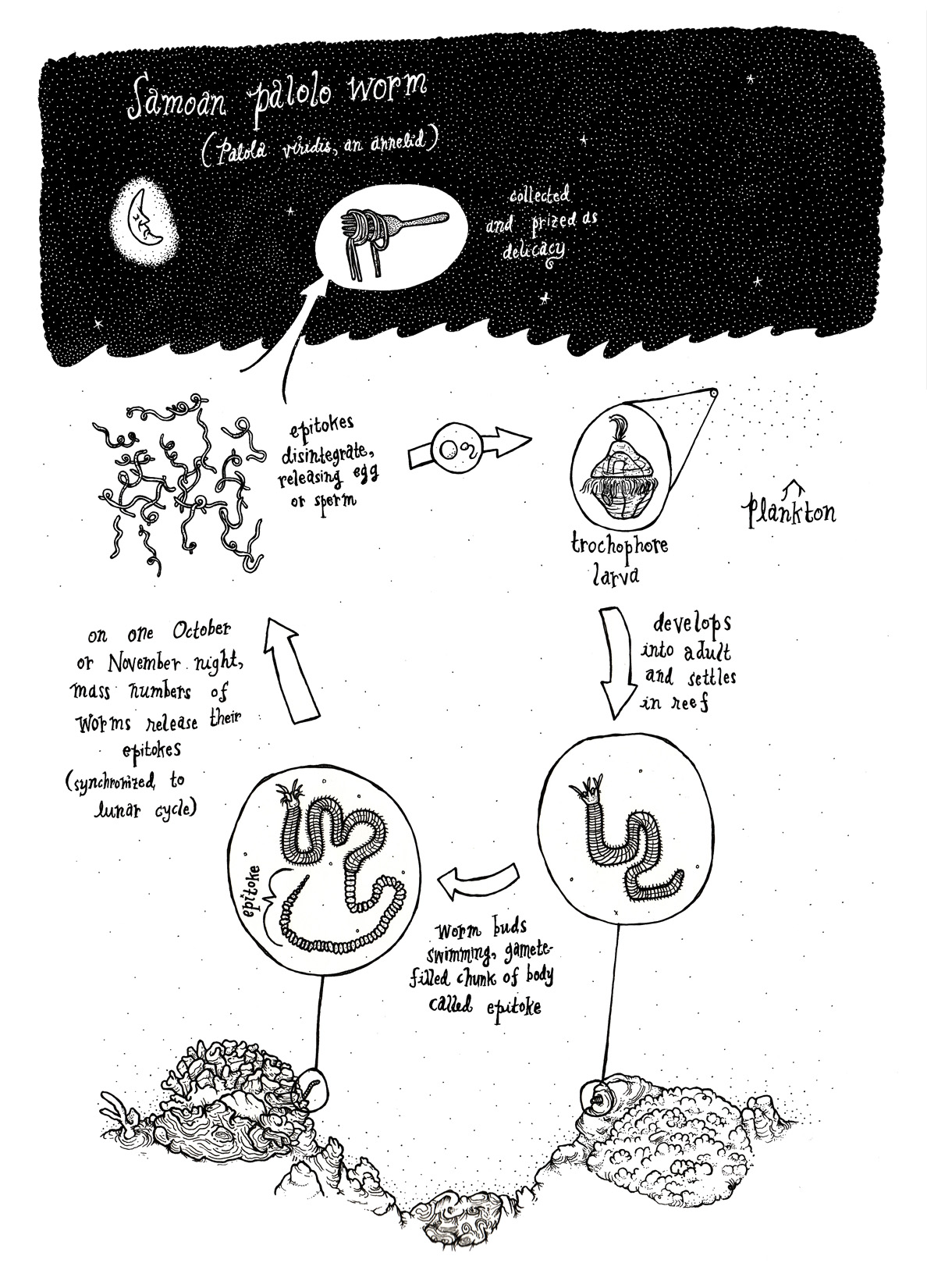
Palolo worm life cycle

Reproduction involves mass spawning at night in spring or early summer (October – November in the Southern Hemisphere). The terminal parts of their bodies drop off in a process known as schizogamy and float over the surface of the water, releasing sperm and eggs. The mechanisms or triggers which induce spawning such that it occurs during nights of a waning moon, continuing for several nights, are not completely known. Exposure to sunlight destroys this "tail" part of the worm's body afterwards. In Fiji, the palolo worms' rising is preceded by the descent of a local red land crab to the sea the same night. In Samoa a crab known as mali'o also descends to the sea around the time when palolo rises. Other sea creatures such as sharks and fishes come to spawn during the event.

== Taxonomy ==
This species is sometimes considered to be synonymous with Palola siciliensis.

== Distribution ==
The palolo worm is found in tropical regions around various islands of the Pacific Ocean, including Samoa, Tonga, Fiji, Papua New Guinea, Indonesia, the Solomon Islands, Vanuatu, and some islands of the Philippines. They are variously known as palolo (Samoa and Tonga), balolo (Fiji), wawo or nyale (Indonesia). Within these tropical regions, the palolo worms are usually found in shallow waters where there is coral rubble for them to take shelter in.

== Cultural use ==
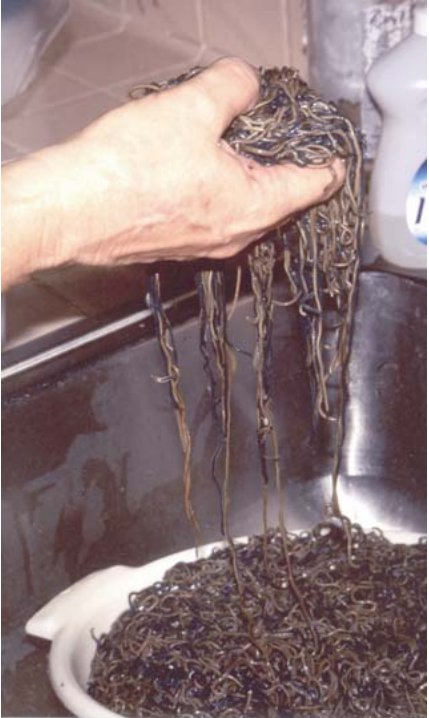

Some Indigenous populations in regions where palolo occur deem the worm a delicacy. During their short-lived annual appearance in the last quarter of the moon in October and November or in February (Lombok, Indonesia), worms are gathered with nets or buckets, and are either eaten raw or cooked in several different ways.

In Samoa, the worms are revered as an excellent food source, hunting for them taking place seven days after the first full moon around the traditional lunar months of Lefanoga or Lotuaga that fall within the Gregorian October. Often bright blue in colour, the flavour is said to resemble a cross between mussels, abalone and oysters. They are sometimes eaten fresh; but usually cooked with coconut milk, or fried with butter and onions and served with taro or banana chips. The palolo harvest is part of the culture and tradition of Samoans, where the feast is shared with family and relatives, but in recent years has been sold in the markets of Apia and Salelologa for more than A$100 per kilogram.

On the island of Lombok in Indonesia, a traditional event called the Nyale Festival, or Bau Nyale (meaning "to catch the sea worms), is held between February and March. The event focuses on catching these worms, which are known as wawo. In local legend, the nyale are believed to be the reincarnation of Princess Mandalika, who had jumped into the sea to drown herself.

The spawning event is so important to the inhabitants of the Torres and Banks Islands of Vanuatu that it is featured in their lunar calendar.
