= Pennichnus =

Trace fossil classification
- Ichnogenus: †Pennichnus; Pan et al., 2021

Ichnospecies
- Pennichnus formosae Pan et al., 2021

Extinct species of worm

Pennichnus is a ichnogenus of trace fossils produced by an extinct ambush‐predatory worm.
