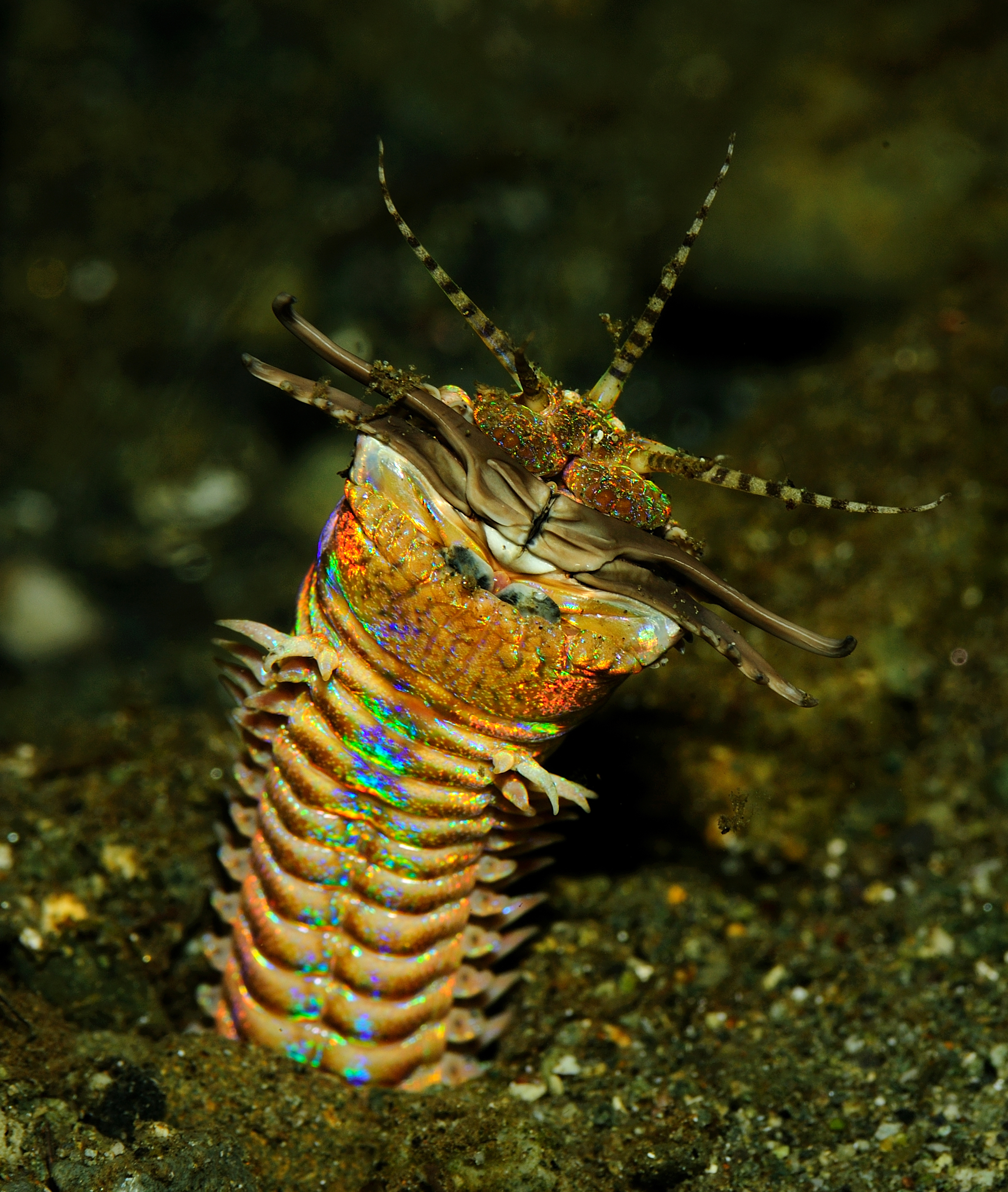
- Eunice aphroditois

Scientific classification
- Kingdom: Animalia
- Phylum: Annelida
- Clade: Pleistoannelida
- Subclass: Errantia
- Order: Eunicida
- Family: Eunicidae
- Genus: Eunice; Cuvier, 1817

Synonyms
- "Eunice" Rafinesque, 1815 (nomen nudum), "Newis"

= Eunice (annelid) =

Genus of worms

Eunice is a genus in the polychaete family Eunicidae. Individuals grow to a length of between 0.5 and 300 cm (0.20 and 118.11 in). Their bodies have multiple segments. They have two eyes and five tentacles. They have well-developed sense organs and relatively large brains. Their color is dark purple-brown to red-brown with a white ring at the fourth segment. They are found in oceans and seas around the world. They have an evertible proboscis with distinctive mouthparts, some of which comprise two rows of maxilliary plates in a radula-like fashion.

== Species ==
- Eunice aciculata (Treadwell, 1922)
- Eunice afra Peters, 1854
- Eunice alata Miura, 1977
- Eunice amphiheliae Marion in Filhol, 1885
- Eunice annulicirrata Miura, 1986
- Eunice antipathum (Pourtalès, 1867)
- Eunice aphroditois Pallas, 1788
- Eunice arcturi (Treadwell, 1928)
- Eunice arenosa Kinberg, 1865
- Eunice argentinensis (Treadwell, 1929)
- Eunice armillata (Treadwell, 1922)
- Eunice articulata Ehlers, 1887
- Eunice atlantica Kinberg, 1865
- Eunice aucklandica Averincev, 1972
- Eunice austropacifica Orensanz, 1990
- Eunice australis Quatrefagus, 1865
- Eunice badia Grube, 1878
- Eunice balfouriana (McIntosh, 1885)
- Eunice barvicensis McIntosh, 1885
- Eunice benedicti (Verrill, 1885)
- Eunice bertoloni (Delle Chiaje, 1828)
- Eunice biannulata Moore, 1904
- Eunice bicirrata Rullier, 1964
- Eunice biformicirrata (Treadwell, 1922)
- Eunice bilobata Treadwell, 1906
- Eunice bipapillata Grube, 1866
- Eunice borneensis (Grube, 1878)
- Eunice bottae Quatrefages, 1866
- Eunice brasiliensis Kinberg, 1865
- Eunice brevis (Ehlers, 1887)
- Eunice bucciensis (Treadwell, 1921)
- Eunice burmeisteri Müller in Grube, 1878
- Eunice caeca Shisko, 1981
- Eunice carrerai Wu, Sun, Liu & Xu, 2013
- Eunice cedroensis Fauchald, 1970
- Eunice challengeriae McIntosh, 1885
- Eunice chicasi de Léon-González, Rivera & Romero, 2004
- Eunice cirribranchis Grube, 1870
- Eunice cirrobranchiata McIntosh, 1885
- Eunice coccinea Grube, 1878
- Eunice coccinioides Augener, 1922
- Eunice collaris Grube, 1868
- Eunice collini Augener, 1906
- Eunice colombia Ardila, Fauchald & Lattig, 2005
- Eunice concinna Zanol, Hutchings & Fauchald, 2020
- Eunice confusus Zanol, Hutchings & Fauchald, 2020
- Eunice congesta Marenzeller, 1879
- Eunice contingens (Chamberlin, 1919)
- Eunice crassitentaculata (Treadwell, 1922)
- Eunice cultrifera Zanol, Hutchings & Fauchald, 2020
- Eunice curticirrus Knox, 1960
- Eunice decolorhami Díaz-Díaz & Rozbaczylo in Díaz-Díaz et al, 2020
- Eunice denticulata Webster, 1884
- Eunice dharastii Zanol & Hutchings, 2022
- Eunice dilatata Grube, 1877
- Eunice djiboutiensis Gravier, 1900
- Eunice donathi Carrera-Parra & Salazar-Vallejo, 1998
- Eunice dubitata Fauchald, 1974
- Eunice edwardsi McIntosh, 1885
- Eunice edwinlinkae Carrera-Parra & Salazar-Vallejo, 1998
- Eunice ehlersi Gravier, 1900
- Eunice eimeorum Fauchald, 1992
- Eunice elegans (Verrill, 1900)
- Eunice equibranchiata McIntosh, 1885
- Eunice eugeniae Fauchald, 1992
- Eunice excariboea Fauchald, 1992
- Eunice fauchaldi Miura, 1986
- Eunice fauveli Gravier, 1900
- Eunice fijiensis Baird, 1869
- Eunice filamentosa Grube & Örsted in Grube, 1856
- Eunice fimbriata Grube, 1870
- Eunice flaccida Grube, 1869
- Eunice flavapunctata (Treadwell, 1922)
- Eunice flavocuprea Grube, 1869
- Eunice flavofasciata Grube, 1878
- Eunice flavopicta Izuka, 1912
- Eunice floridana (Pourtalès, 1867)
- Eunice franklini Monro, 1924
- Eunice frauenfeldi Grube, 1866
- Eunice fucata Ehlers, 1887
- Eunice fusicirris Grube, 1878
- Eunice gagzoi Augener, 1922
- Eunice gallica (Savigny in Lamarck, 1818)
- Eunice goodei Fauchald, 1992
- Eunice goodsiri (McIntosh, 1885)
- Eunice gracilis Grube, 1866
- Eunice gravieri Fauvel, 1911
- Eunice grubei Gravier, 1900
- Eunice guanica (Treadwell, 1921)
- Eunice guildingi Baird, 1869
- Eunice guttata Baird, 1869
- Eunice hainanensis Wu, Sun, Liu & Xu, 2013
- Eunice hartmanae Carrera-Parra & Salazar-Vallejo, 1998
- Eunice havaica Kinberg, 1865
- Eunice hawaiensis Treadwell, 1906
- Eunice hernandezi Carrera-Parra & Salazar-Vallejo, 1998
- Eunice heterochaeta Quatrefages, 1866
- Eunice hirschi Fauchald, 1992
- Eunice hispanica (Savigny in Lamarck, 1818)
- Eunice ibarzabalae Carrera-Parra & Salazar-Vallejo, 1998
- Eunice imogena (Monro, 1924)
- Eunice impexa Grube, 1878
- Eunice indica Kinberg, 1865
- Eunice interrupta Treadwell, 1906
- Eunice investigatoris Fauvel, 1932
- Eunice jagori Grube, 1878
- Eunice japonica Fauchald, 1992
- Eunice jihueiensis Hsueh & Li, 2014
- Eunice johnsoni Hartman, 1954
- Eunice kerguelensis Averincev, 1972
- Eunice kinbergi Ehlers, 1868
- Eunice kobiensis McIntosh, 1885
- Eunice kristiani Hartmann-Schröder in Hartmann-Schröder & Zibrowius, 1998
- Eunice lanai Carrera-Parra & Salazar-Vallejo, 1998
- Eunice langi (Treadwell, 1943)
- Eunice leptocirrus Grube, 1870
- Eunice leucosticta Grube, 1878
- Eunice levibranchia (Hoagland, 1920)
- Eunice lita (Chamberlin, 1919)
- Eunice longicirris Grube, 1869
- Eunice longicornis Grube, 1866
- Eunice longisetis Webster, 1884
- Eunice macrobranchia (Schmarda, 1861)
- Eunice macrochaeta Schmarda, 1861
- Eunice magellanica McIntosh, 1885
- Eunice magnifica Grube, 1866
- Eunice makemoana (Chamberlin, 1919)
- Eunice manihine Longbottom, 1970
- Eunice manorae Aziz, 1938
- Eunice marconii Nogueira, Steiner & Amaral, 2001
- Eunice marenzelleri Gravier, 1900
- Eunice margaritacea Williams, 1853
- Eunice margariticacea Fischli, 1900
- Eunice marianae Hartmann-Schröder in Hartmann-Schröder & Zibrowius, 1998
- Eunice marovoi Gibbs, 1971
- Eunice martensi Grube, 1878
- Eunice masudai Miura, 1986
- Eunice medicina Moore, 1903
- Eunice megabranchia Fauchald, 1970
- Eunice microprion Marenzeller, 1879
- Eunice mindanavensis McIntosh, 1885
- Eunice misakiensis (Miura, 1987)
- Eunice modesta Grube, 1866
- Eunice mucronata Moore, 1903
- Eunice multicylindri Shisko, 1981
- Eunice multipectinata Moore, 1911
- Eunice murrayi McIntosh, 1885
- Eunice musorstomica Hartmann-Schröder, 1998
- Eunice mutabilis Gravier, 1900
- Eunice narconi Baird, 1869
- Eunice neocaledoniensis Lechapt, 1992
- Eunice nesiotes (Chamberlin, 1919)
- Eunice nicidioformis Treadwell, 1906
- Eunice nigricans Schmarda, 1861
- Eunice nonatoi Carrera-Parra & Salazar-Vallejo, 1998
- Eunice northioidea Moore, 1903
- Eunice norvegica (Linnaeus, 1767)
- Eunice oerstedii Stimpson, 1853
- Eunice oliga (Chamberlin, 1919)
- Eunice orensanzi de Léon-González, 1990
- Eunice ornata Andrews, 1891
- Eunice ovalifera Fauvel, 1936
- Eunice pacifica Kinberg, 1865
- Eunice palauensis Okuda, 1937
- Eunice panamena (Chamberlin, 1919)
- Eunice papeetensis (Chamberlin, 1919)
- Eunice parasegregata Hartmann-Schröder, 1965
- Eunice parva Hansen, 1882
- Eunice parvibranchis Grube, 1870
- Eunice paupera Grube, 1878
- Eunice pauroneurata (Chamberlin, 1919)
- Eunice pectinata Grube, 1869
- Eunice pelamidis Quatrefages, 1866
- Eunice pellucida Kinberg, 1865
- Eunice pennata (O.F. Müller, 1776)
- Eunice perimensis Gravier, 1900
- Eunice perrieri Gravier, 1900
- Eunice petersi Fauchald, 1992
- Eunice philippinensis Hartmann-Schröder & Zibrowius, 1998
- Eunice philocorallia Buchanan, 1893
- Eunice plessisi Rullier, 1972
- Eunice plicata Baird, 1869
- Eunice polybranchia (Verrill, 1880)
- Eunice prayensis Kinberg, 1865
- Eunice procera Grube, 1866
- Eunice profunda Miura, 1987
- Eunice prognatha McIntosh, 1885
- Eunice pruvoti Fauchald, 1992
- Eunice pulvinopalpata Fauchald, 1982
- Eunice purpurea Grube, 1866
- Eunice quinquifida Moore, 1903
- Eunice quoya Quatrefages, 1866
- Eunice reducta Fauchald, 1970
- Eunice reticulata Hsueh & Li, 2014
- Eunice riojai de León-González, 1988
- Eunice romanvivesi de Léon-González & Castañeda, 2006
- Eunice rosaurae Monro, 1939
- Eunice roussaei Quatrefages, 1866
- Eunice rubrivittata (Treadwell, 1921)
- Eunice rubrocincta Ehlers, 1868
- Eunice rullieri Fauchald, 1992
- Eunice salvadorensis de Léon-González, Rivera & Romero, 2004
- Eunice savignyi Grube, 1878
- Eunice schemacephala Schmarda, 1861
- Eunice schizobranchia Claparède, 1870
- Eunice scombrinis Quatrefages, 1866
- Eunice sebastiani Nonato, 1965
- Eunice segregata (Chamberlin, 1919)
- Eunice semisegregata Fauchald, 1969
- Eunice shihmenensis Hsueh & Li, 2014
- Eunice solita Amoureux, 1978
- Eunice sonorae Fauchald, 1970
- Eunice splendida Grube, 1856
- Eunice spongicola (Treadwell, 1921)
- Eunice stanleyi Fauchald, 1992
- Eunice stigmatura (Verrill, 1900)
- Eunice subdepressa Grube, 1866
- Eunice suviensis (Treadwell, 1922)
- Eunice tahitana Kinberg, 1865
- Eunice tanseiae Miura, 1986
- Eunice taoi Hsueh & Li, 2014
- Eunice tentaculata Kinberg, 1865
- Eunice tenuicirrata (Verrill, 1900)
- Eunice tenuis (Treadwell, 1921)
- Eunice tibiana (Pourtalès, 1867)
- Eunice tovarae Carrera-Parra & Salazar-Vallejo, 2011
- Eunice tribranchiata McIntosh, 1885
- Eunice tridentata Ehlers, 1905
- Eunice tristriata Grube, 1870
- Eunice tubicola (Treadwell, 1922)
- Eunice tubifex Crossland, 1904
- Eunice unibranchiata Imajima, 2006
- Eunice unidentata Rioja, 1962
- Eunice unifrons (Verrill, 1900)
- Eunice upoloae Zanol, Hutchings & Fauchald, 2020
- Eunice uschakovi Wu, Sun & Liu, 2013
- Eunice valenciennesii Grube, 1878
- Eunice validobranchiata Monro, 1937
- Eunice violaceomaculata Ehlers, 1887
- Eunice vittata (Delle Chiaje, 1828)
- Eunice vittatopsis Fauchald, 1970
- Eunice vivida Stimpson, 1853
- Eunice wasinensis Fauchald, 1992
- Eunice websteri Fauchald, 1969
- Eunice weintraubi Lu & Fauchald, 1998
- Eunice woodwardi Baird, 1869
- Eunice wui Lu & Fauchald, 1998
- Eunice yamamotoi Miura, 1986
- Eunice zonata Delle Chiaje, 1841
