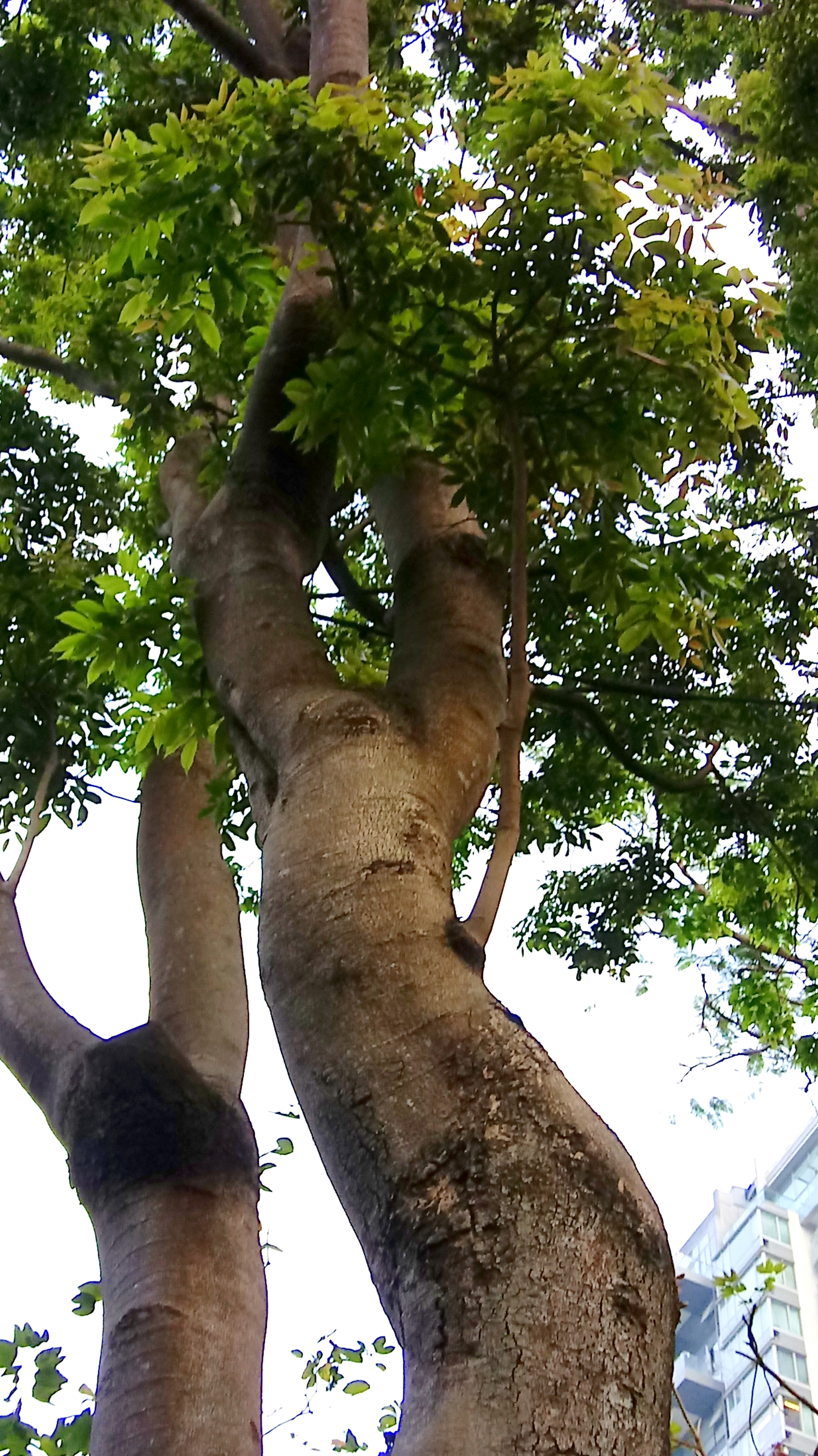
- Lysidice rhodostegia
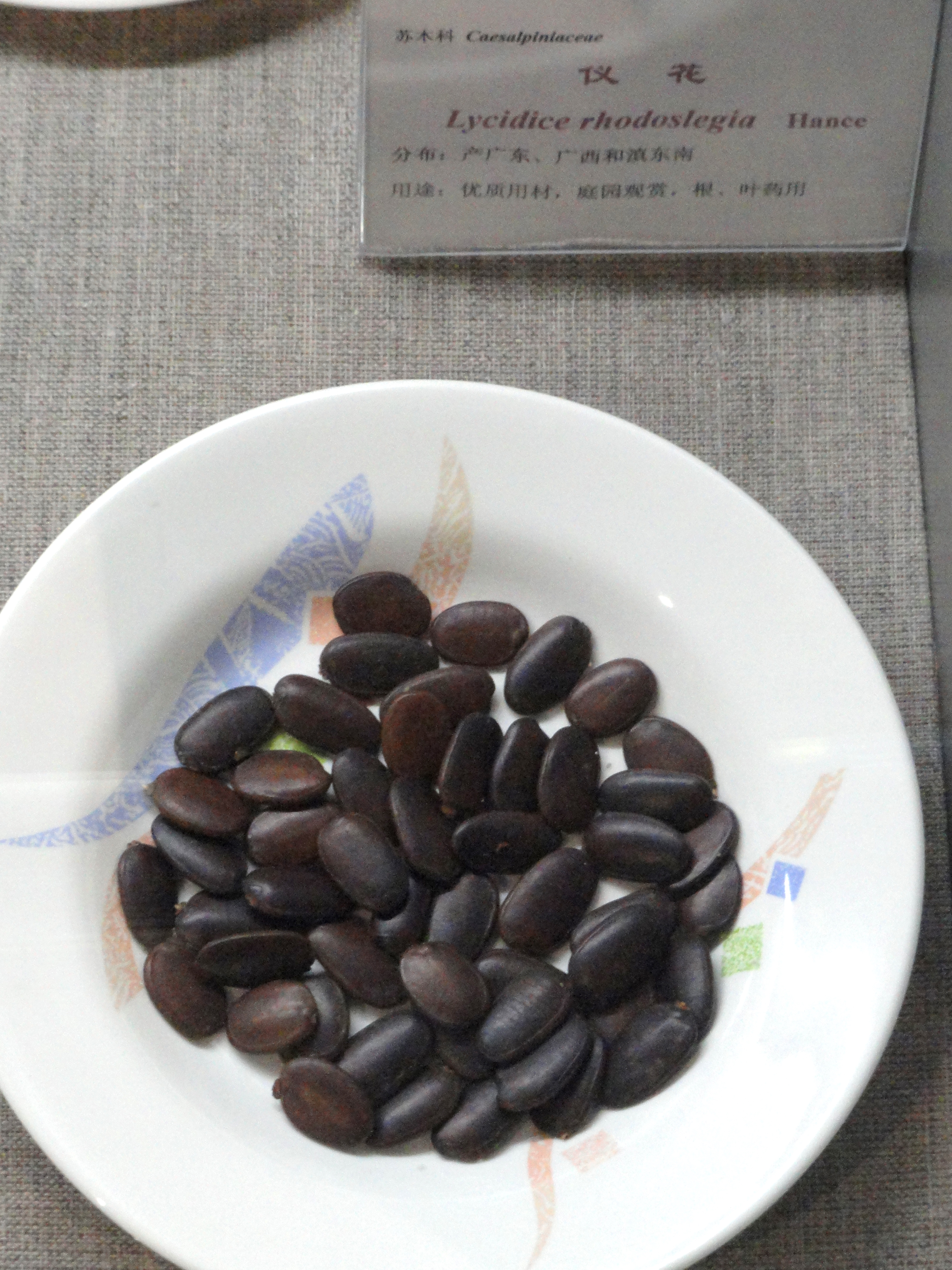
- Lysidice rhodostegia seeds - Kunming Botanical Garden, Kunming, Yunnan, China

Scientific classification
- Kingdom: Plantae
- Clade: Embryophytes
- Clade: Tracheophytes
- Clade: Spermatophytes
- Clade: Angiosperms
- Clade: Eudicots
- Clade: Rosids
- Order: Fabales
- Family: Fabaceae
- Subfamily: Detarioideae
- Tribe: Saraceae
- Genus: Lysidice; Hance

Species
- Lysidice brevicalyx C.F.Wei; Lysidice rhodostegia Hance

= Lysidice (plant) =

Genus of legumes

Lysidice is a plant genus in the subfamily Detarioideae. It includes two known species of trees and shrubs native to southern China and Vietnam. Typical habitats include tropical riverine forests and open rocky slopes.
