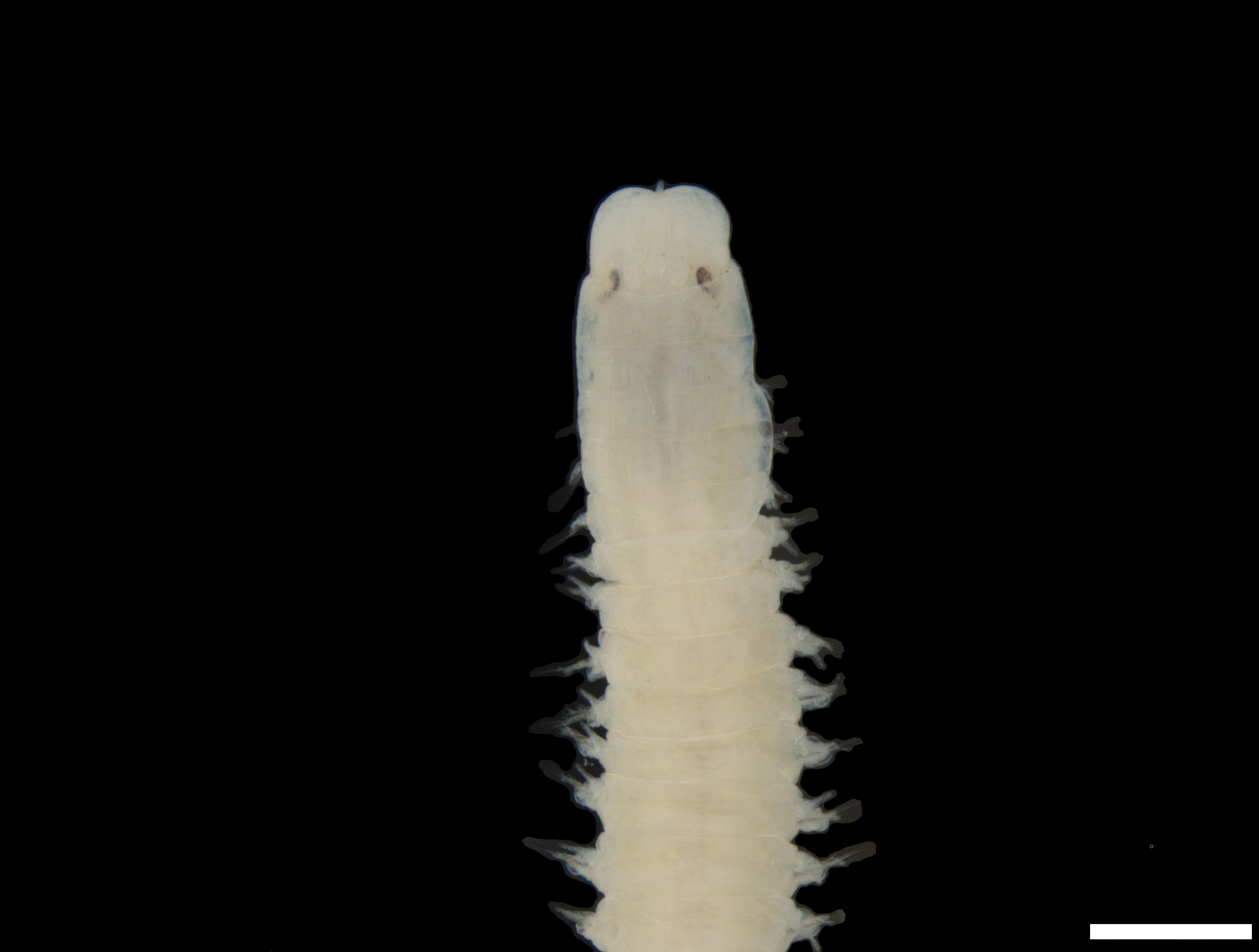
- Lysidice ninetta

Scientific classification
- Kingdom: Animalia
- Phylum: Annelida
- Clade: Pleistoannelida
- Subclass: Errantia
- Order: Eunicida
- Family: Eunicidae
- Genus: Lysidice; Lamarck, 1818

= Lysidice (annelid) =

Genus of annelid worms

Lysidice is a genus of polychaete worms in the family Eunicidae.

The genus was originally described by Marie Jules César Savigny in 1818, describing three species from France and Spain, identified initially as L. galathina , L. olympia, and L. valentina.

It’s been assessed by various authors that the genus taxonomy needs to be revised, especially its older taxa and their synonymies and some specific species with morphological and molecular variability.

== Species ==
Species recognised as of august 2026 are:

- Lysidice adrianae Carrera-Parra, Fauchald & Gambi, 2011
- Lysidice advena Putignano, Langeneck & Toso in Putignano et al. 2026
- Lysidice americana Verrill, 1873
- Lysidice annulicornis (Ehlers, 1868)
- Lysidice boholensis Grube, 1878
- Lysidice caribensis Carrera-Parra, Fauchald & Gambi, 2011
- Lysidice carriebowensis Carrera-Parra, Fauchald & Gambi, 2011
- Lysidice collaris Grube, 1868
- Lysidice elongata (Quatrefages, 1866)
- Lysidice filum (Quatrefages, 1866)
- Lysidice galathina Savigny in Lamarck, 1818
- Lysidice hebes (Verrill, 1900)
- Lysidice kuekenthali Fischli, 1900
- Lysidice natalensis Kinberg, 1865
- Lysidice ninetta Audouin & H Milne Edwards, 1833
- Lysidice notata Ehlers, 1887
- Lysidice oculata (Ehlers, 1868)
- Lysidice oele Horst, 1902
- Lysidice olympia Savigny in Lamarck, 1818
- Lysidice pectinifera (Quatrefages, 1866)
- Lysidice perrieri Rochebrune, 1882
- Lysidice phyllisae Carrera-Parra, Fauchald & Gambi, 2011
- Lysidice punctata Grube, 1855
- Lysidice robusta Stimpson, 1855
- Lysidice rufa Gosse, 1853
- Lysidice schmardae (McIntosh, 1885)
- Lysidice thalassicola Carrera-Parra, Fauchald & Gambi, 2011
- Lysidice torquata Quatrefages, 1850
- Lysidice tortugae Treadwell, 1921
- Lysidice trimera Ehlers, 1901
- Lysidice unicornis (Grube, 1840)
- Lysidice valentina Savigny in Lamarck, 1818
