= Marphysa mossambica =

Scientific classification
- Kingdom: Animalia
- Phylum: Annelida
- Clade: Pleistoannelida
- Subclass: Errantia
- Order: Eunicida
- Family: Eunicidae
- Genus: Marphysa
- Species: M. mossambica

Binomial name
- Marphysa mossambica (Peters, 1854)

Synonyms
- Eunice mossambica Peters, 1854; Marphysa moribidii Idris, Hutchings & Arshad, 2014; Nauphanta mossambica (Peters, 1854)

Species of annelid worm

Marphysa mossambica is a species of annelid worm in the family Eunicidae. It is found in East Africa, the Philippines and Australia.

== Description ==
M. mossambica can be distinguished by the antennae positions, which do not extend as far from the head as in M. sanguinea, and due to the species having eyes located on the outer side of base of the inner antennae.

== Taxonomy ==
The species was first described by Wilhelm Peters in 1854 as Eunice mossambica.

== Distribution and habitat ==
M. mossambica is found in areas including sandy coastal areas of East Africa, the Indian Ocean, Red Sea, the Philippines and Australia, where it is found in New South Wales, Queensland and South Australia.
