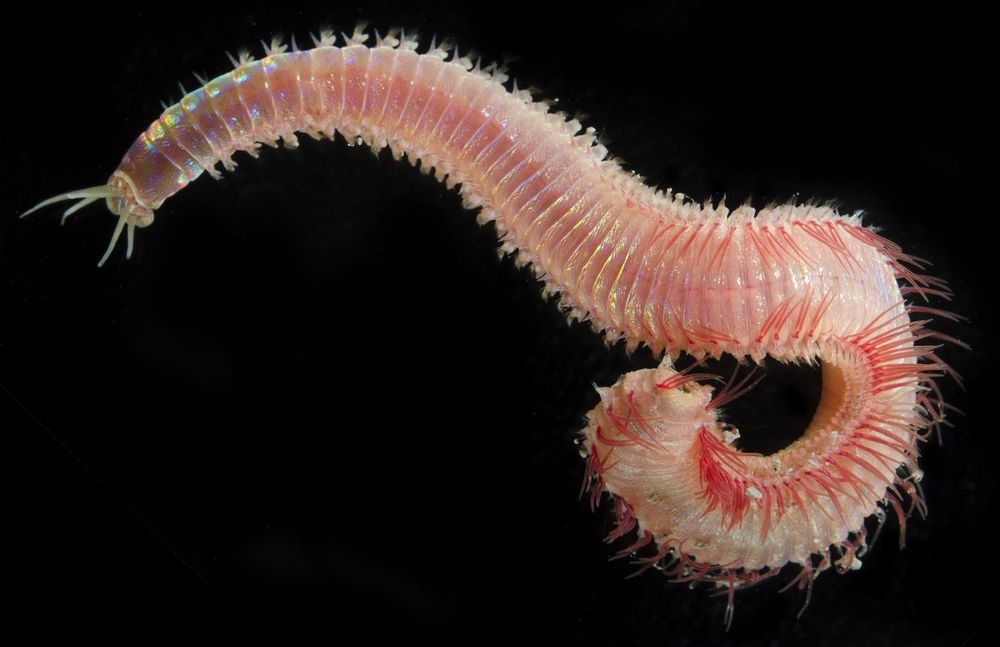
- Marphysa sanguinea

Scientific classification
- Kingdom: Animalia
- Phylum: Annelida
- Clade: Pleistoannelida
- Subclass: Errantia
- Order: Eunicida
- Family: Eunicidae
- Genus: Marphysa; Quatrefages, 1865

= Marphysa =

Genus of polychaete worms

Marphysa is a genus of annelids belonging to the family Eunicidae.

The genus has cosmopolitan distribution.

== Species ==
Species recognised on WoRMS as of October 2023:

- Marphysa aenea (Blanchard, 1849)
- Marphysa acicularum Webster, 1884
- Marphysa aegypti Elgetany, El-Ghobashy, Ghoneim & Struck, 2018
- Marphysa aenea (Blanchard in Gay, 1849)
- Marphysa americana Monro, 1933
- Marphysa angelensis Fauchald, 1970
- Marphysa aransensis Treadwell, 1939
- Marphysa atlantica (Kinberg, 1865)
- Marphysa baileybrockae Molina-Acevedo & Idris, 2020
- Marphysa banana Lavesque, Daffe, Glasby, Hourdez & Hutchings, 2022
- Marphysa baudini Lavesque, Zanol, Daffe, Flaxman & Hutchings, 2023
- Marphysa bernardi Rullier, 1972
- Marphysa bifurcata Kott, 1951
- Marphysa birgeri Molina-Acevedo & Idris, 2020
- Marphysa bonhardi (McIntosh, 1885)
- Marphysa borradailei Pillai, 1958
- Marphysa brasiliensis (Hansen, 1882)
- Marphysa brevibranchiata Treadwell, 1921
- Marphysa brevitentaculata Treadwell, 1921
- Marphysa californica Moore, 1909
- Marphysa capensis (Schmarda, 1861)
- Marphysa chevalensis Willey, 1905
- Marphysa chirigota Martin, Gil & Zanol in Martin et al. 2020
- Marphysa corallina (Kinberg, 1865)
- Marphysa davidattenboroughi Lavesque, Zanol, Daffe, Flaxman & Hutchings, 2023
- Marphysa depressa (Schmarda, 1861)
- Marphysa digitibranchia Hoagland, 1920
- Marphysa durbanensis Day, 1934
- Marphysa emiliae Molina-Acevedo & Carrera-Parra, 2017
- Marphysa fauchaldi Glasby & Hutchings, 2010
- Marphysa fijiensis Molina-Acevedo & Idris, 2021
- Marphysa formosa Steiner & Amaral, 2000
- Marphysa fragilis Treadwell, 1911
- Marphysa furcellata Crossland, 1903
- Marphysa gaditana Martin, Gil & Zanol in Martin et al. 2020
- Marphysa galluccii Orensanz, 1990
- Marphysa gayi Quatrefages, 1866
- Marphysa gravelyi Southern, 1921
- Marphysa haemasona Quatrefages, 1866
- Marphysa hamata (Schmarda, 1861)
- Marphysa hongkongensa Wang, Zhang & Qiu, 2018
- Marphysa iloiloensis Glasby, Mandario, Burghardt, Kupriyanova, Gunton & Hutchings, 2019
- Marphysa januarii (Grube, 1881)
- Marphysa johnsoni (Langerhans, 1880)
- Marphysa kristiani Zanol, da Silva & Hutchings, 2016
- Marphysa leidii Quatrefages, 1866
- Marphysa macintoshi Crossland, 1903
- Marphysa madrasi Hutchings, Lavesque, Priscilla, Daffe, Malathi & Glasby, 2020
- Marphysa mangeri Augener, 1918
- Marphysa mauritanica Gillet, 1990
- Marphysa maxidenticulata Liu, Hutchings & Kupriyanova, 2018
- Marphysa minima (Hansen, 1882)
- Marphysa moribidii Idris, Hutchings & Arshad, 2014
- Marphysa mortenseni Monro, 1928
- Marphysa mossambica (Peters, 1854)
- Marphysa mullawa Hutchings & Karageorgopoulos, 2003
- Marphysa multipectinata Liu, Hutchings & Sun, 2017
- Marphysa nobilis Treadwell, 1917
- Marphysa orensanzi Carrera-Parra & Salazar-Vallejo, 1998
- Marphysa orientalis (Willey, 1905)
- Marphysa orientalis Treadwell, 1936
- Marphysa papuaensis Lavesque, Daffe, Glasby, Hourdez & Hutchings, 2022
- Marphysa parishii Baird, 1869
- Marphysa peruviana Quatrefages, 1866
- Marphysa pseudosessiloa Zanol, da Silva & Hutchings, 2017
- Marphysa quadrioculata (Grube, 1856)
- Marphysa regalis Verrill, 1900
- Marphysa sanguinea (Montagu, 1813)
- Marphysa schmardai Gravier, 1907
- Marphysa sebastiana Steiner & Amaral, 2000
- Marphysa sessilobranchiata Hartmann-Schröder, 1984
- Marphysa sherlockae Kara, Molina-Acevedo, Zanol, Simon & Idris, 2020
- Marphysa simplex (Langerhans, 1884)
- Marphysa soembaensis Augener, 1933
- Marphysa striata (Kinberg, 1865)
- Marphysa stylobranchiata Moore, 1909
- Marphysa tamurai Okuda, 1934
- Marphysa teres (Treadwell, 1922)
- Marphysa teretiuscula (Schmarda, 1861)
- Marphysa tribranchiata Liu, Hutchings & Sun, 2017
- Marphysa tripectinata Liu, Hutchings & Sun, 2017
- Marphysa unibranchiata Knox & Cameron, 1970
- Marphysa victori Lavesque, Daffe, Bonifácio & Hutchings, 2017
- Marphysa viridis Treadwell, 1917
- Marphysa zanolae Lavesque, Daffe, Glasby, Hourdez & Hutchings, 2022
