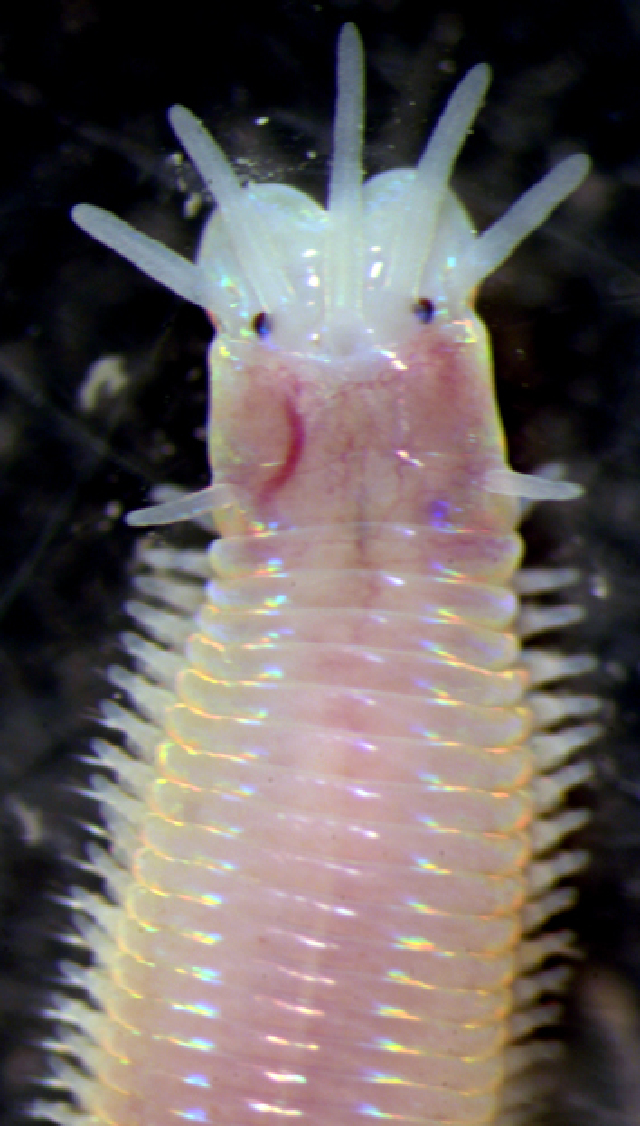

Scientific classification
- Kingdom: Animalia
- Phylum: Annelida
- Clade: Pleistoannelida
- Subclass: Errantia
- Order: Eunicida
- Family: Eunicidae
- Genus: Palola; Gray in Stair, 1847

Type species
- Palola viridis Gray in Stair, 1847

Species
- See text

Synonyms
- Eunice Gray in Stair, 1847; Lithognatha Stewart, 1881; Palolo Macdonald, 1858 (misspelled)

= Palola =

Genus of polychaetes

Palola is a genus of polychaetes belonging to the family Eunicidae.

The genus has almost cosmopolitan distribution, except northernward regions.

Species:

- Palola accrescens (Hoagland, 1920)
- Palola brasiliensis Zanol, Paiva & Attolini, 2000
- Palola ebranchiata (Quatrefages, 1866)
- Palola edentulum (Ehlers, 1901)
- Palola esbelta Morgado & Amaral, 1981
- Palola leucodon (Ehlers, 1901)
- Palola madeirensis (Baird, 1869)
- Palola pallidus Hartman, 1938
- Palola paloloides (Moore, 1909)
- Palola siciliensis (Grube, 1840)
- Palola simplex (Peters, 1854)
- Palola valida (Gravier, 1900)
- Palola vernalis (Treadwell, 1922)
- Palola viridis Gray in Stair, 1847
