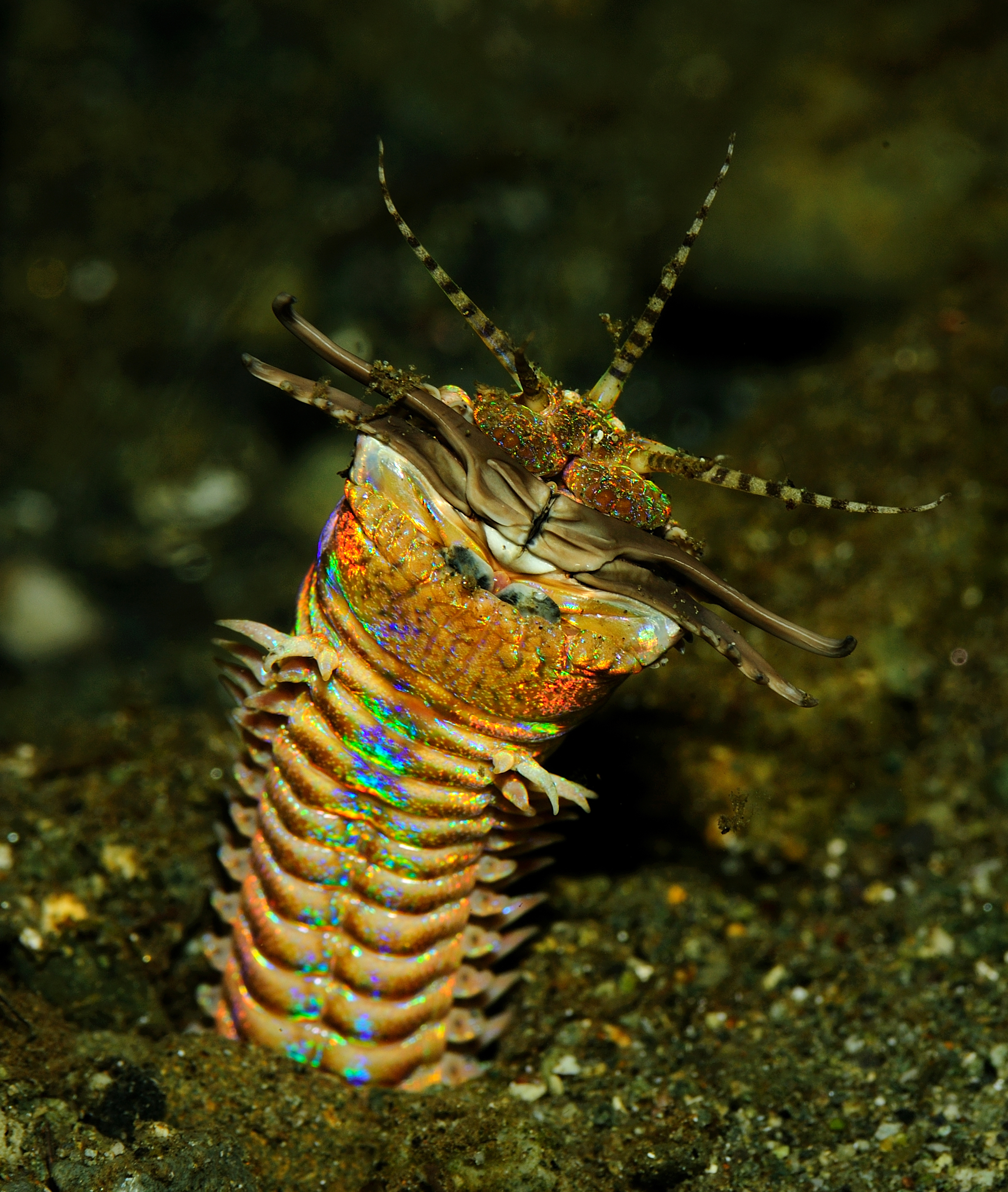
- Eunice aphroditois, the type species of Eunicidae's type genus

Scientific classification
- Kingdom: Animalia
- Phylum: Annelida
- Clade: Pleistoannelida
- Subclass: Errantia
- Order: Eunicida
- Family: Eunicidae; Berthold, 1827

Synonyms
- Euniphysidae Shen & Wu, 1991

= Eunicidae =

Eunicidae Temporal range: Ordovician–recent

Family of annelids

Eunicidae is a family of marine polychaetes (bristle worms), inhabiting diverse benthic habitats across Oceania, Europe, South America, North America, Asia and Africa.

One of the most conspicuous of the eunicids is the giant, dark-purple, iridescent "bobbit worm" (Eunice aphroditois), a bristle worm found at low tide under boulders on southern Australian shores. Its robust, muscular body can be as long as 2 m (6 ft 7 in). Cultural tradition surrounds the palolo worm (Palola viridis) reproductive cycles in the South Pacific Islands. Eunicidae are economically valuable as bait in both recreational and commercial fishing. Commercial bait-farming of Eunicidae can have adverse ecological impacts, as it may deplete worm and associated fauna population numbers, damaging local intertidal environments, and introduce alien species to local aquatic ecosystems.

== History of knowledge ==
In 1992, Kristian Fauchald detailed a conclusive history of research and classification of the Eunicidae family. Primary studies undertaken in 1767 on coral reefs in Norway, initially classified Eunicid species under the Nereis family. In 1817, Georges Cuvier created a new genus, Eunice, to classify these and other original taxa. Throughout the 1800s (1832-1878) worm species were added to this genera by Jean Victor Audouin and Henri Milne-Edwards, Kinberg, Edwardsia de Quatrefages, Malmgren, Ehlers and Grube. Following the Challenger and Albatross expeditions, research was expanded by McIntosh and Chamberlain. In 1921 and 1922, Treadwell added new species from coral reefs in the Caribbean Sea and the Pacific Ocean. Species were reviewed and their classifications were refined by Fauvel, Augener and Hartman throughout the early 1900s. In 1944, Hartman codified a system of separate classification for the family, informally grouping North American species using the original suggestions of Ehlers. Hartman's system was expanded and specified by Fauchald in 1970 and later again by Miura in 1986.

== Taxonomy ==
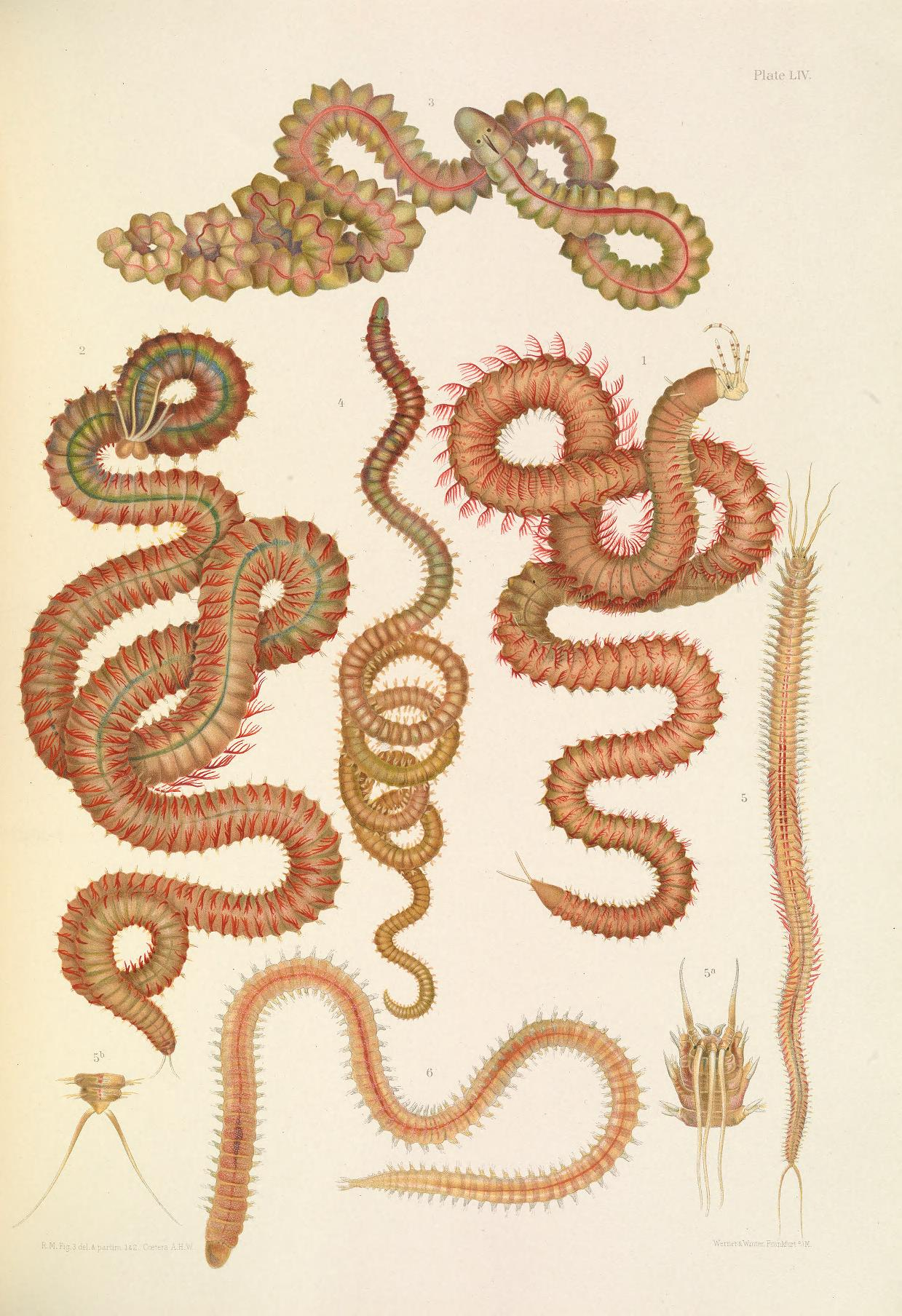
A lithograph of British marine annelids including Eunice fasciata (1) and Marphysa sanguinea (2)

Many genera were historically placed in this family, though only twelve are currently considered valid:

- Aciculomarphysa (Hartmann-Schroeder, 1998 in Hartmann-Schroder & Zibrowius 1998)
- †Esconites Thompson & Johnson, 1977
- Eunice (Cuvier, 1817)
- Euniphysa (Wesenberg-Lund, 1949)
- Fauchaldius (Carrera-Parra & Salazar-Vallejo, 1998)
- Leodice Lamarck, 1818
- Lysidice (Lamarck, 1818)
- Marphysa (Quatrefages, 1866)
- Nicidion Kinberg, 1865
- Palola (Gray in Stair, 1847)
- Paucibranchia Molina-Acevedo, 2018
- Treadwellphysa Molina-Acevedo & Carrera-Parra, 2017

Heteromarphysa Verrill, 1900 & Lysibranchia Cantone, 1983 are nomina dubia, dubious genera that are unlikely to be valid.

Fossilized jaws of Eunicidae are known from as far back as Ordovician sediments. The trace fossil ichnotaxon Lepidenteron lewesiensis likely corresponds to the fossilized burrow of a eunicid. These burrows are often lined with the fossilized remains of the prey of their occupant, which include a diversity of fish taxa; as these elongated burrows are often fully lined with fish bones, it can cause these burrows to be easily mistaken for the complete skeleton of an eel-like fish.

== Anatomy ==
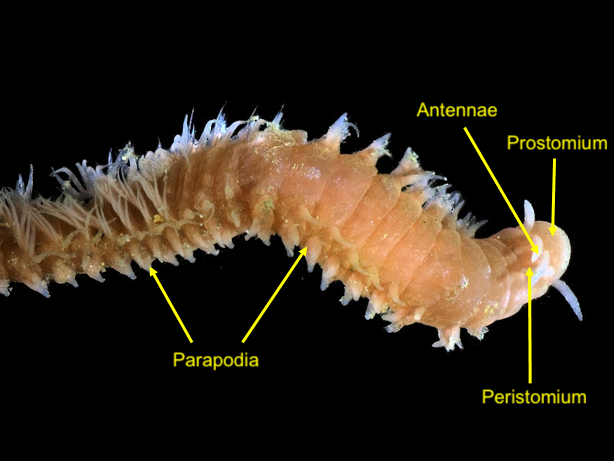
Basic Eunicidae anatomy based on Marphysa sanguinea

Members of the Eunicidae family are distinguished from other families in Eunicida by having a rear segment with 1-3 antennae and no ringed bases on their antennae.

The first body segment of Eunicidae is either whole or consists of two lobes. Some species of Eunicidae have extensions of the body wall that loop into the vascular system. These usually consist of either comb-like or single filaments. The gills of live specimens are typically identifiable by their bright red colour.

=== Head and jaws ===
The eunicid anatomy typically consists of a pair of appendages near the mouth (mandibles) and complex sets of muscular structures on the head (maxillae) in an eversible pharynx.

A pair of slender and cylindrical sensory appendages are typically situated near the head of Eunicidae. The lips of Eunicidae can be either reduced or well-developed. In species of Eunice, worms have five appendages on two elongated segmented appendages and three antennae near their heads. This feature is not part of the anatomy of all genera in the Eunicidae family. Eunicidae jaws are typically well developed and partly visible on the underside of the worm or on its surface at the front of the mouth in a complex structure.

== Ecology ==
=== Distribution and habitat ===
Eunicidae are distributed in diverse benthic habitats across Oceania, Europe, South America, North America, Asia and Africa. Eunicids play an ecological role in benthic communities, exhibiting a preference for subtidal hard substrates in shallow temperate waters, tropical waters and mangrove swamps. Most species of Eunicidae inhabit cracks and crevices in assorted rubble, rock, and sand environments. In limestone or coral reefs, Eunicids create parchment-like tubes within coral burrows or remain in crevices of calcareous algae.

=== Diet ===
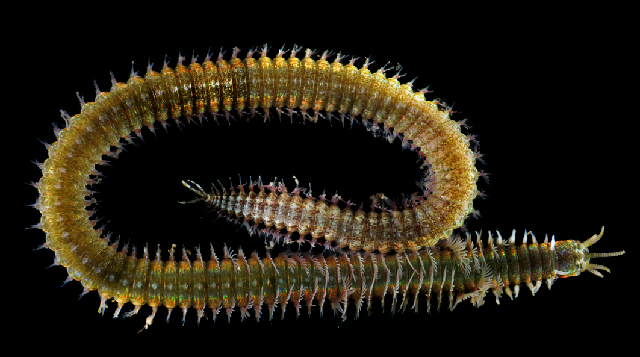
Eunice sp.

Eunicid diets vary across genera. For example, Eunice aphroditois crawl on the seafloor where they scavenge in a carnivorous feeding pattern on marine worms, small crustaceans, molluscs, algae and detritus. Other species, for example Euniphysa tubifex and large Eunice, hunt the surrounds of their coral habitats and feed on the decaying flesh of dead sea-life. Burrowing species of Eunicidae (Lysidice and Palola) are primarily herbivores. These species feed on matured corals and contained organisms or on types of algae. The diet of Marphysa species of Eunicidae is variable, some worms are herbivores, some are carnivores, and others omnivores.

=== Life cycle ===
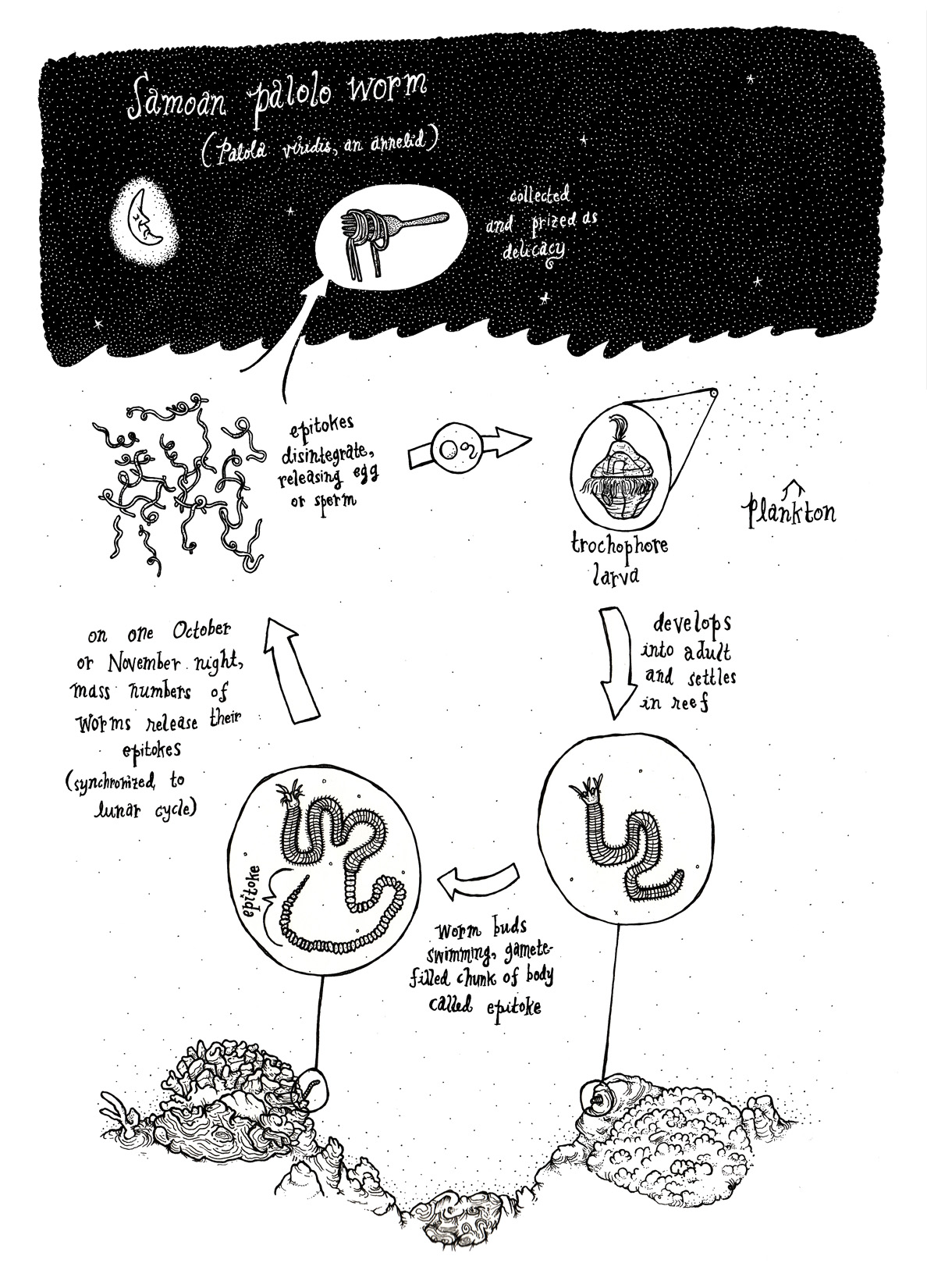
Palolo worm epitoky cycle in Samoa

Most of the class Polychaeta are sexually reproductive and lack external reproductive organs.

During the breeding season, female polychaetes produce a pheromone that induces a mutual release of male sperm and female eggs. This ensures reproductive synchrony, though some species ensure this by forming reproductive swarms in a phenomenon known as epitoky. During this process, there is no actual male to female contact, as the gametes are ejected into open water, being released through an excretory gland (metanephridia) or by the worm's body-wall rupturing, which kills the animal. Post-fertilisation, most eggs become planktonic; although some remain inside the worm tubes or burrow in external jelly masses attached to the tubes. Epitokes may draw an increased number of pelagic predators, As seen in the Florida Keys where swarming Eunice fucata attract large gatherings of tarpon, being highly publicised in local fishing communities. These mass swarming events, or 'risings', are a spectacle that is the foundation of local tradition in Samoa, Fiji, Tonga, Papua New Guinea, Vanuatu, Kiribati and Indonesia.

Research indicates that mudworm survival and growth may be affected by changes in salinity rates.

=== As introduced species ===
Importing Eunicidae species is an established alternative to exploiting local populations for bait. This process may lead to accidental species introductions or invasions. Alien species can threaten the foundation of local ecosystems by altering food webs, habitat structures and gene pools. Alien species can also introduce diseases and parasites. Six species of Eunice, one species of Euniphysa, three species of Lysidice and one species of Marphysa sp. were identified as alien in local aquatic ecosystems across the Mediterranean, the Red Sea, the USA Pacific and the North Sea. Live bait worms are often emptied into the water body by anglers at the end of a fishing session, this is another practice that can introduce alien species to aquatic ecosystems.

== Relation to humans ==
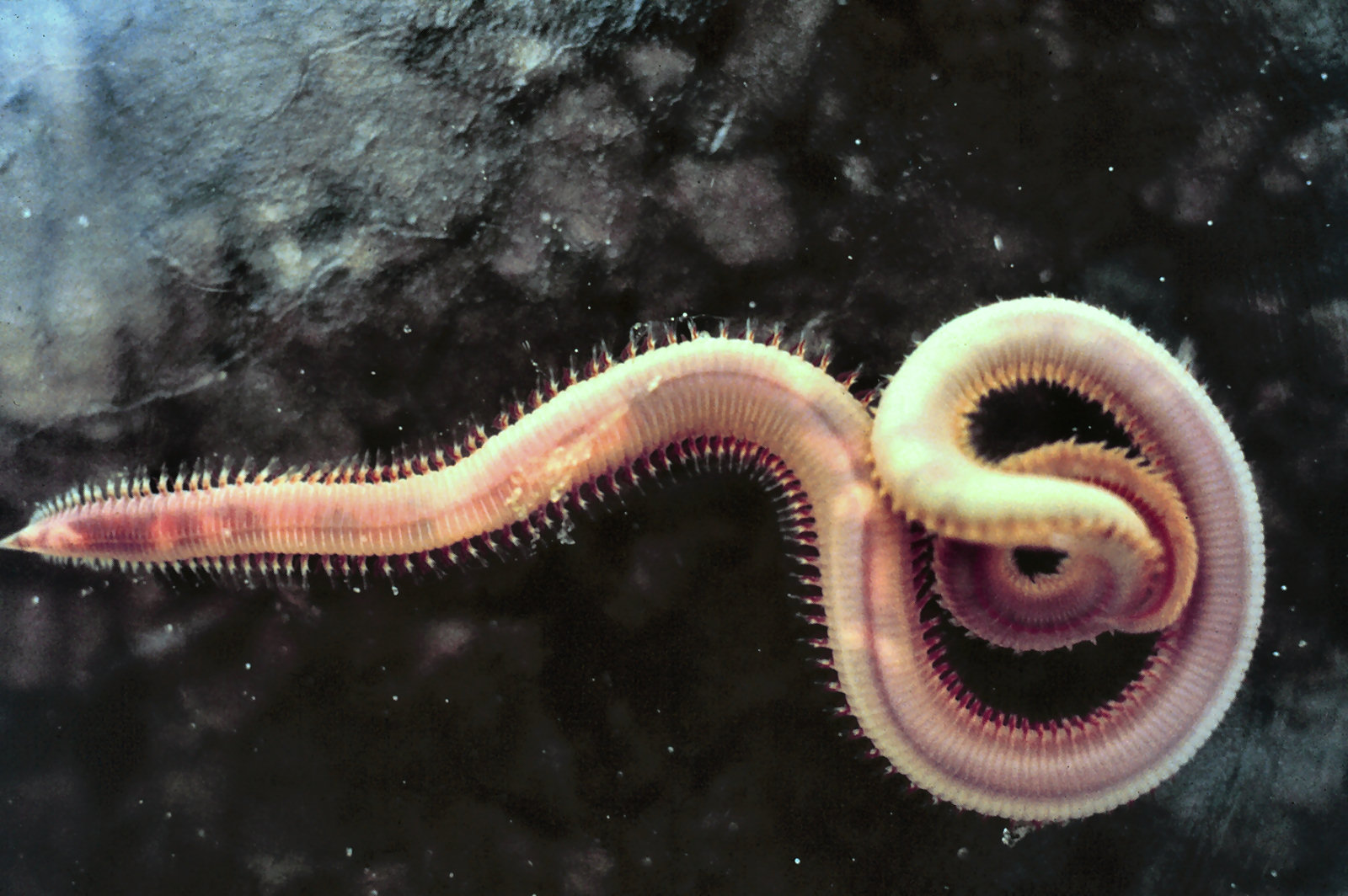
A bloodworm

Marphysa sanguinea, or known locally in Italy as "Murrido", "Murone", "Bacone", and "Verme sanguigno" (literally "blood worm") is the most valuable bait of all Polychaete species collected in Italy. This species is also cultivated in US and South Korea and is typically commercially harvested once at its optimal length of 20–30 cm (7.9–11.8 in). Marphysa sanguinea can reach up to 50 cm (20 in) long and is collected by excavating in deep sediment. For example, in the Venice lagoon, fisherman dig below the sediment layers colonised by the nereidids and sieve organic material through coarse screens. This process is also common in Italian coastal areas with intertidal and shallow littoral muddy bottoms. Eunice aphroditois, another sizeable (up to 1 m (3 ft 3 in) in length) species of Eunicidae, is harvested by scuba divers along the Italian Apulia coasts. This species is collected at soft bottom ocean floors at a depth of 10 m (33 ft) using specialised harvesting instruments that fit into U-shaped parchment tubes where the worm lives. This species of Eunicidae is suitable bait for fish of the Sparidae family and is used in commercial hook and line practice. Species within the Eunicidae family are also caught by recreational and commercial fisherman in estuaries along the West coast of Portugal and in Arcahon Bay in France. Marphysa are propagated and harvested in Australian estuary communities located along the coast of New South Wales and Queensland. Collecting of Marphysa moribidii as bait occurs along the West coast of Peninsular Malaysia, Marphysa elityeni are caught in subsistence fisheries in Africa and Eunice sebastiani have been reported as being harvested for bait in Brazil. Eunicids are also used as supplementary feed for aquaculture. For example, mudworms are a part of the black tiger prawn diet in some Thailand hatcheries. The practice of harvesting polychaetes (including species in the Eunicidae family) as bait may have negative ecological impacts on intertidal habitats and on worm population numbers. In 2019, Cabral et al. found that Marphysa sanguinea are placed at risk by overfishing and unlicensed harvesting in Portugal. The ecological impacts of bait harvesting activity can also affect associated fauna populations as well as sediment quality and bioavailability of heavy metals.

=== In culture ===
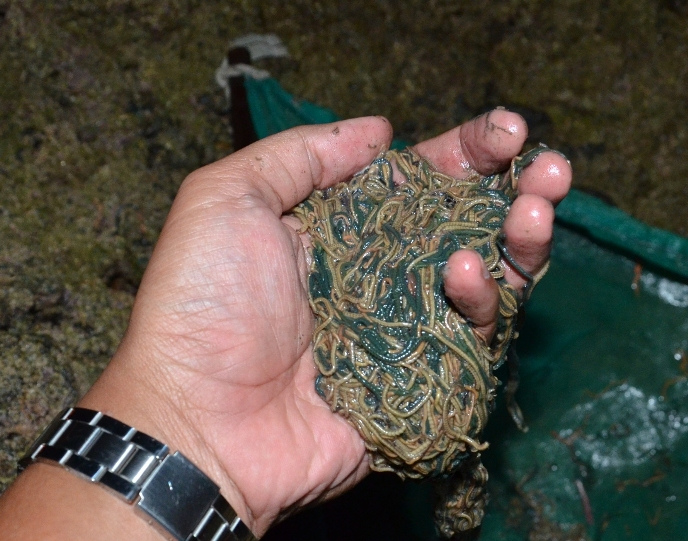
Harvest of palolo worms

In the Indo-Pacific, during 1-2 nights each year, the epitokes of the Palola viridis species are automatised. The sizeable epitokes (up to 30 cm (12 in) in length) swim autonomously upwards and rupture, releasing gametes across the surface of the ocean. The epitokes are composed of hundreds of segments, with females emerald in colour and males transitioning from orange to brown during maturation. On 'rising' night it is tradition for some local communities to attract epitokes with artificial light sources or using other traditional methods. In Samoa for example, locals wear necklaces made of mosoʻoi flowers and use the fragrant floral scent to attract palolo worms. The epitokes are scooped from the shallows into nets and containers to be consumed raw, or cooked, baked, dried or frozen for later consumption.
