= Parasclerocheilus branchiatus =

Scientific classification
- Domain: Eukaryota
- Kingdom: Animalia
- Phylum: Annelida
- Clade: Pleistoannelida
- Clade: Sedentaria
- Order: Opheliida
- Family: Scalibregmatidae
- Genus: Parasclerocheilus
- Species: P. branchiatus

Binomial name
- Parasclerocheilus branchiatus Fauvel, 1928

Species of worm

Parasclerocheilus branchiatus is a species of worm in the family, Scalibregmatidae, and was first described by Pierre Fauvel in 1928.

It is a segmented marine worm, living on the sea bottom in mud at depths of about 400 m. It feeds on detritus on the ocean floor, and is found in the seas surrounding the Arabian Peninsula.
