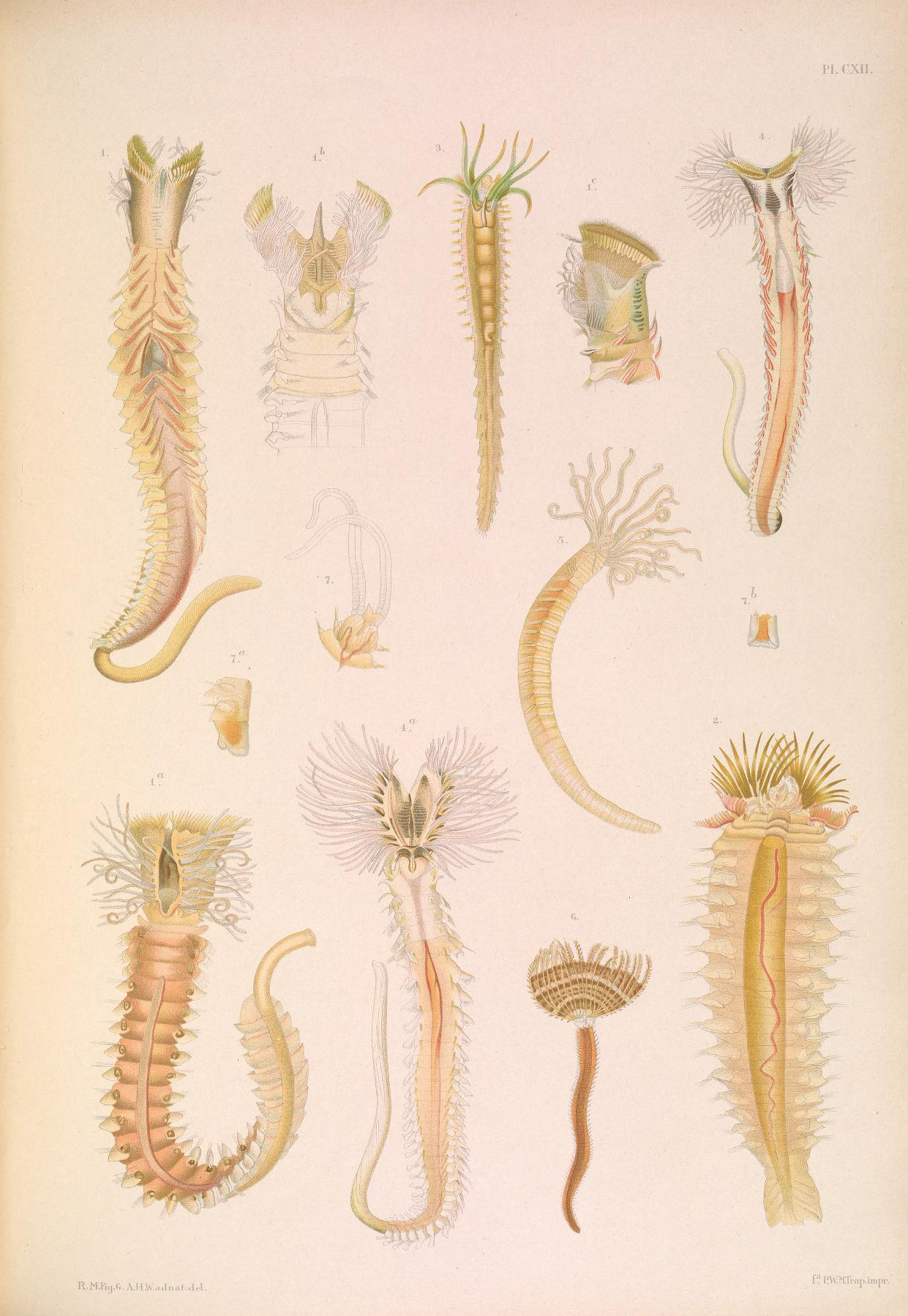
- Ampharete acutifrons, the type species

Scientific classification
- Kingdom: Animalia
- Phylum: Annelida
- Clade: Pleistoannelida
- Clade: Sedentaria
- Order: Terebellida
- Family: Ampharetidae
- Subfamily: Ampharetinae
- Genus: Ampharete; Malmgren, 1866

Species
- 45 species (see text)

Synonyms
- Sabellides Milne Edwards, 1838

= Ampharete =

Genus of annelids

Ampharete is a genus of polychaete annelid worms. They have a single, chevron-shaped row of teeth.

== Species ==
The World Register of Marine Species recognizes the following 45 species:

- Ampharete acutifrons (Grube, 1860)
- Ampharete agulhasensis (Day, 1961)
- Ampharete americana Day, 1973
- Ampharete ampullata Imajima, Reuscher & Fiege, 2012
- Ampharete arctica Malmgren, 1866
- Ampharete baltica Eliason, 1955
- Ampharete borealis (M. Sars, 1856)
- Ampharete californica (Hilbig, 2000)
- Ampharete capensis (Day, 1961)
- Ampharete cinnamomea Imajima, Reuscher & Fiege, 2012
- Ampharete cornuta (Hilbig, 2000)
- Ampharete crassiseta Annenkova, 1929
- Ampharete debrouweri Jeldes & Lefevre, 1959
- Ampharete eupalea Chamberlin, 1920
- Ampharete falcata Eliason, 1955
- Ampharete finmarchica (M. Sars, 1865)
- Ampharete gagarae Uschakov, 1950
- Ampharete goesi Malmgren, 1866
- Ampharete homa Chamberlin, 1919
- Ampharete johanseni Chamberlin, 1920
- Ampharete kerguelensis McIntosh, 1885
- Ampharete kudenovi Jirkov, 1994
- Ampharete labrops Hartman, 1961
- Ampharete lindstroemi Malmgren, 1867 sensu Hessle, 1917
- Ampharete lineata (Berkeley & Berkeley, 1943)
- Ampharete longipaleolata Uschakov, 1950
- Ampharete luederitzi (Augener, 1918)
- Ampharete macrobranchia Caullery, 1944
- Ampharete manriquei (Salazar-Vallejo, 1996)
- Ampharete minuta Langerhans, 1880
- Ampharete octocirrata (Sars, 1835)
- Ampharete oculata (Webster, 1879)
- Ampharete oculicirrata Parapar, Moreira & Barnich, 2019
- Ampharete parvidentata Day, 1973
- Ampharete petersenae Zhirkov, 1997
- Ampharete reducta Chamberlin, 1920
- Ampharete santillani Parapar, Kongsrud, Kongshavn, Alvestad, Aneiros & Moreira, 2017
- Ampharete saphronovae Jirkov, 1994
- Ampharete setosa Verrill, 1873
- Ampharete sibirica (Wirén, 1883)
- Ampharete sombreriana McIntosh, 1885
- Ampharete trilobata Webster & Benedict, 1887
- Ampharete undecima Alvestad, Kongsrud & Kongshavn, 2014
- Ampharete vega (Wirén, 1883)
- Ampharete villenai Parapar, Helgason, Jirkov & Moreira, 2012
