= Brada =

Brada may refer to:

- Brada (writer), pseudonym of Henrietta Consuelo Sansom, French writer
- Brada-Rybníček, a municipality in the Czech Republic
- Brada (annelid), a genus of worms
