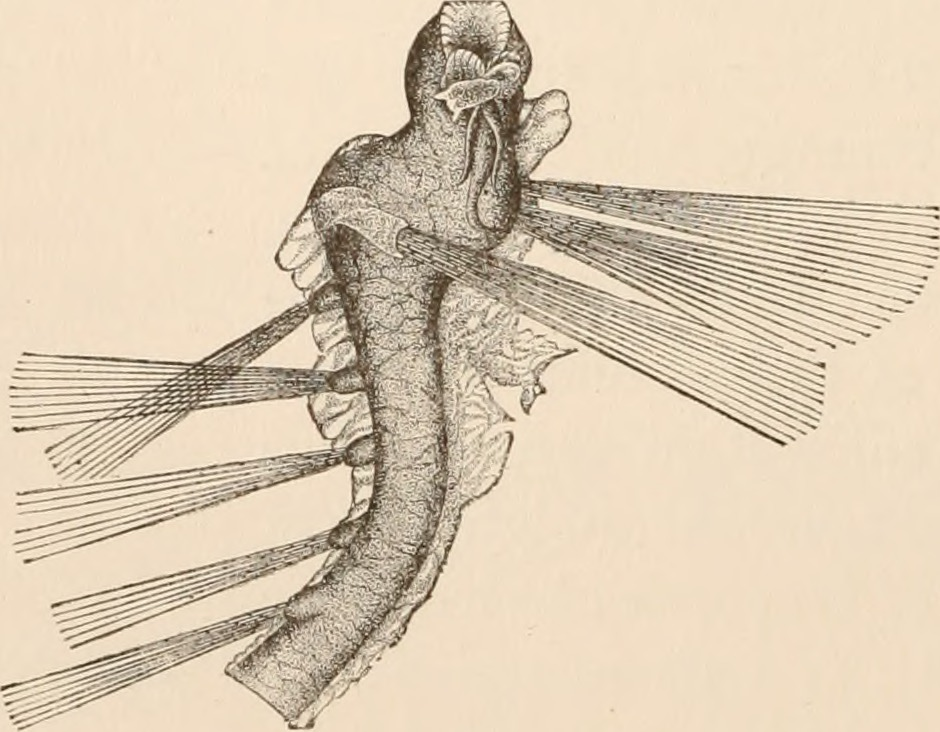
- Buskiella abyssorum

Scientific classification
- Domain: Eukaryota
- Kingdom: Animalia
- Phylum: Annelida
- Clade: Pleistoannelida
- Clade: Sedentaria
- Order: Terebellida
- Family: Flotidae
- Genus: Buskiella; McIntosh, 1885

Species
- Buskiella abyssorum; Buskiella flabelligera; Buskiella vitjasi

= Buskiella =

Genus of pelagic polychaetes

Buskiella is a genus of pelagic polychaete annelids placed either in the family Flotidae or Flabelligeridae. In appearance, they are generally bluish or yellowish, depending on lighting conditions, and live exclusively in very deep water. They move by swinging their bodies from side to side, "rowing with [their] bristles." Species have nine to eleven chaetigers (chaeta-bearing segments).

== Appearance ==
=== Buskiella abyssorum ===
Buskiella abyssorum are covered by a transparent mucus sheath. Like flabelligerid worms, they have a cephalic cage, a structure of long, slender chaetae forming a fan-like structure around the head. They also have prominent, well-developed parapodia.

The species was first described by McIntosh in 1885 from deep waters off Sierra Leone. It has since been reported in the same area, as well as further out in the Atlantic ocean.

=== Buskiella flabelligera ===
Buskiella flabelligera was first described as Flota flabelligera by Olga Hartman off southwestern Chile in 1967.

Buskiella flabelligera have less than ten segments and are covered by a thick mucus sheath. They are covered with papillae, especially Bioluminescence reported from this species, spanning length of the body but with distinctly brighter spots. The species is most similar to B. vitjasi.

=== Buskiella vitjasi ===
Buskiella vitjasi (originally described in 1977 as Flota vitjasi) grows to between 20 and 30 mm long and has 9 chaetigers. They are found at depths between 4000 and 6000 metres below sea level near Kuril-Kamchatka trench in the Pacific Ocean. The colour in preserved specimens varies between reddish brown and light brown. Their gelatinous sheath is thick and translucent, and covers both the head and the body.

== Taxonomic history ==
- 1967: Genus Flota described with one species (F. flabelligera) in the family Flabelligeridae by Olga Hartman in her "Polychaetous Annelids Collected by the USNS Eltanin and Staten Island Cruises, Chiefly from Antarctic Seas"
- 1971: Genus transferred by Hartman into the newly-erected Fauveliopsidae.
- 1977: A second species, Flota vitjasi, is described by Galina N. Buzhinskaja.
- 1996: Flota placed in new family, Flotidae, erected by Buzhinskaja.
- 2001: Rouse considers Flota very close to Poeobiidae, and placed both in Flabelligeridae. He also considered the family Flotidae "redundant".
- 2006: Buzhinskaja defends the family status of Flotidae and re-establishes it.
- 2007: Flota species are transferred to within Buskiella.
