= Parasclerocheilus =

Scientific classification
- Domain: Eukaryota
- Kingdom: Animalia
- Phylum: Annelida
- Class: Polychaeta
- Order: Opheliida
- Family: Scalibregmatidae
- Genus: Parasclerocheilus; Fauvel, 1928

Genus of worms

Parasclerocheilus is a genus of worms in the family, Scalibregmatidae, first described by Pierre Fauvel in 1928.

They are segmented marine worms, living on the sea bottom in mud at depths of about 400 m.

There are three species in the genus:

- Parasclerocheilus branchiatus Fauvel, 1928
- Parasclerocheilus capensis Day, 1961
- Parasclerocheilus parva
