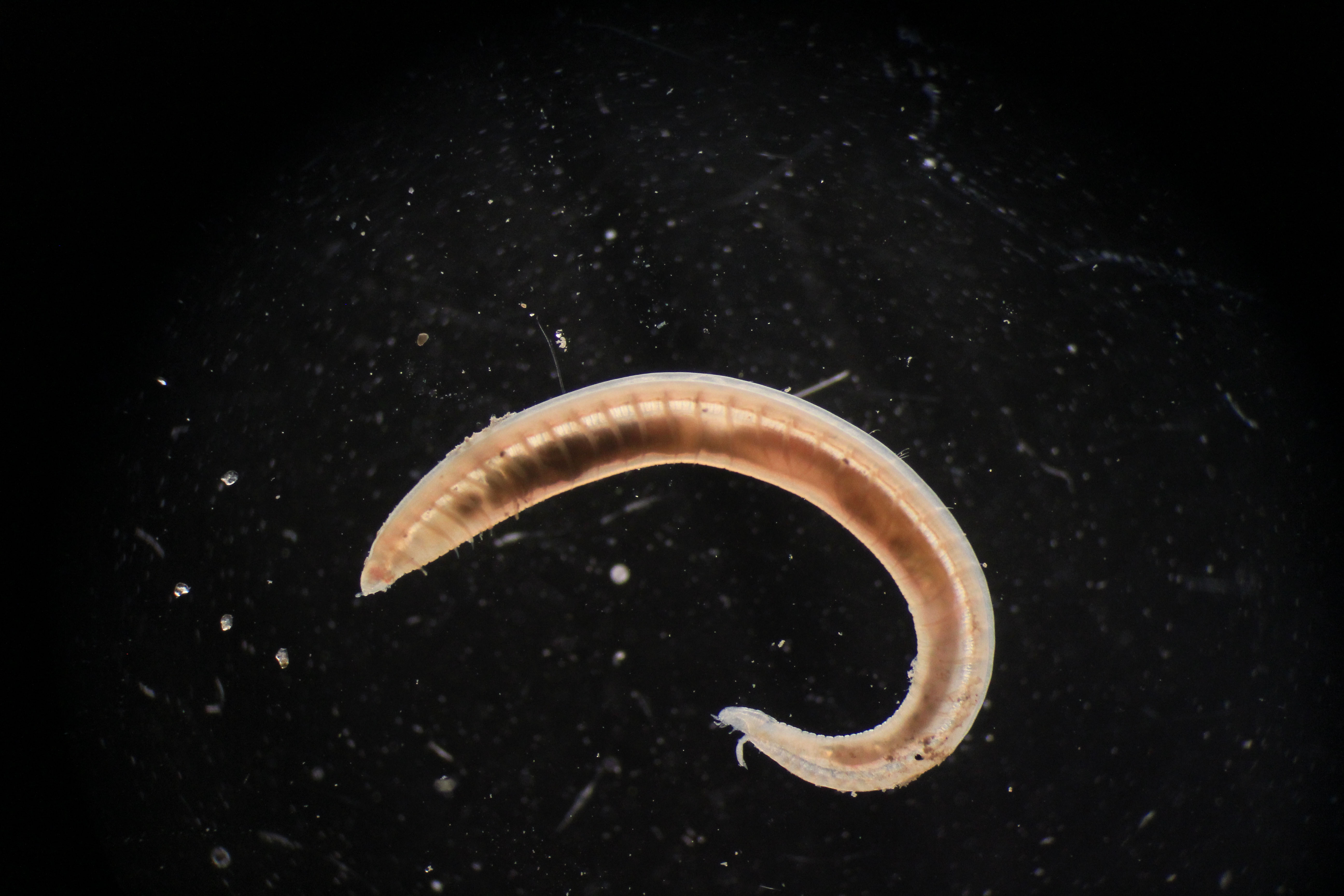

Scientific classification
- Domain: Eukaryota
- Kingdom: Animalia
- Phylum: Annelida
- Clade: Pleistoannelida
- Clade: Sedentaria
- Family: Opheliidae
- Genus: Ophelina
- Species: O. acuminata

Binomial name
- Ophelina acuminata Örsted, 1843

= Ophelina acuminata =

Species of annelid worm

Ophelina acuminata is a species of marine annelids, found in the sublittoral mud and sand bottom.

== Morphology ==
Body slender and 25–60 mm long, with 50 chaetae bearing segments. Colour yellowish or pearly grey with bright red gills, and all segments finely multi-annulated. The prostomium is conical, ending in a median progress with a slightly swollen tip and two big dorsolateral nuchal-crevasses. Except first, and two to three last segments, all chaetigers has long cirriform gills, and ventral cirri. Anus surmounted by a spoon shaped hood with a ventral opening, 20 fine annular rings and 14-20 long papillae along edge. On the ventral side of basis, two long cirrus, behind one unpaired longer cirri. .

== Ecology ==
Found marine, in the shallow sublittoral. Mostly on sand, but as well seen on mixed muddy bottoms, from 10 to 1200 m. From Northern Atlantic, along the African west coast to South Africa, northern part of the Pacific, and in the Indian Ocean. Swims snake-like, or are digging in the upper part of the bottom. Substrate surface deposit feeder, reproduction unknown.
