= Armandia =

Armandia may refer to:

- Armandia (annelid), a genus of polychaetes in the family Opheliidae
- Armandia, a genus of flatworms in the family Lacistorhynchidae, synonym of Grillotia
- Armandia, a genus of gastropods in the family Camaenidae, synonym of Armandiella
