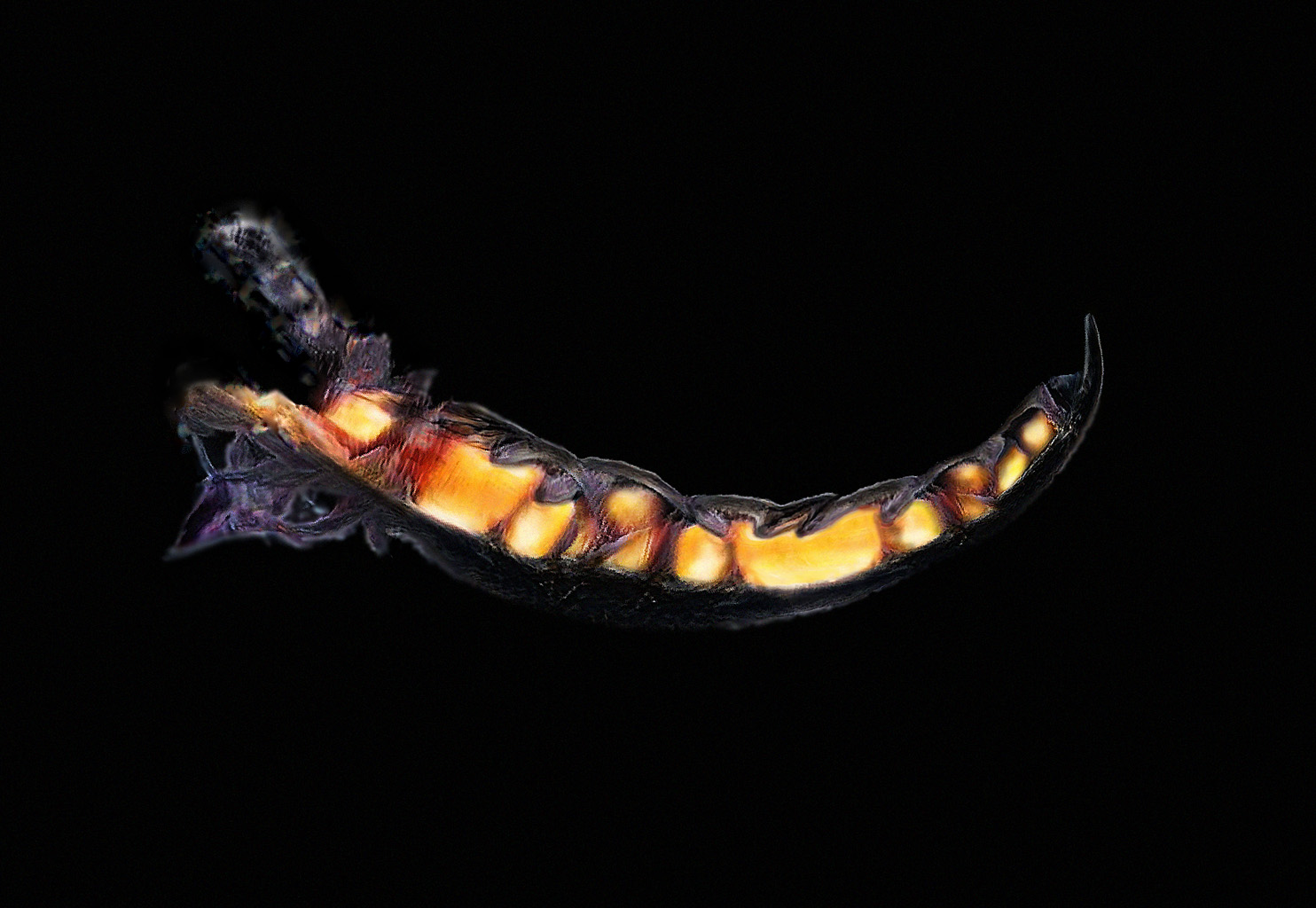
- Melinnopsis dubita

Scientific classification
- Kingdom: Animalia
- Phylum: Annelida
- Clade: Pleistoannelida
- Clade: Sedentaria
- Order: Terebellida
- Family: Ampharetidae
- Subfamily: Melinninae; Chamberlin, 1919

= Melinninae =

Subfamily of annelid worms

Melinninae are a subfamily of the Ampharetidae, belonging to the Terebellida (bristle worms).

The Mellinninae are described firstly by Ralph V. Chamberlin in The Annelida Polychaeta, 1919.

On page 443 he states:

" One or two stout dorsal spines caudad of the branchiae on each side; number of somites large, near seventy or more...Melinninae",

. The WoRMS currently lists eleven direct children of the subfamily.
