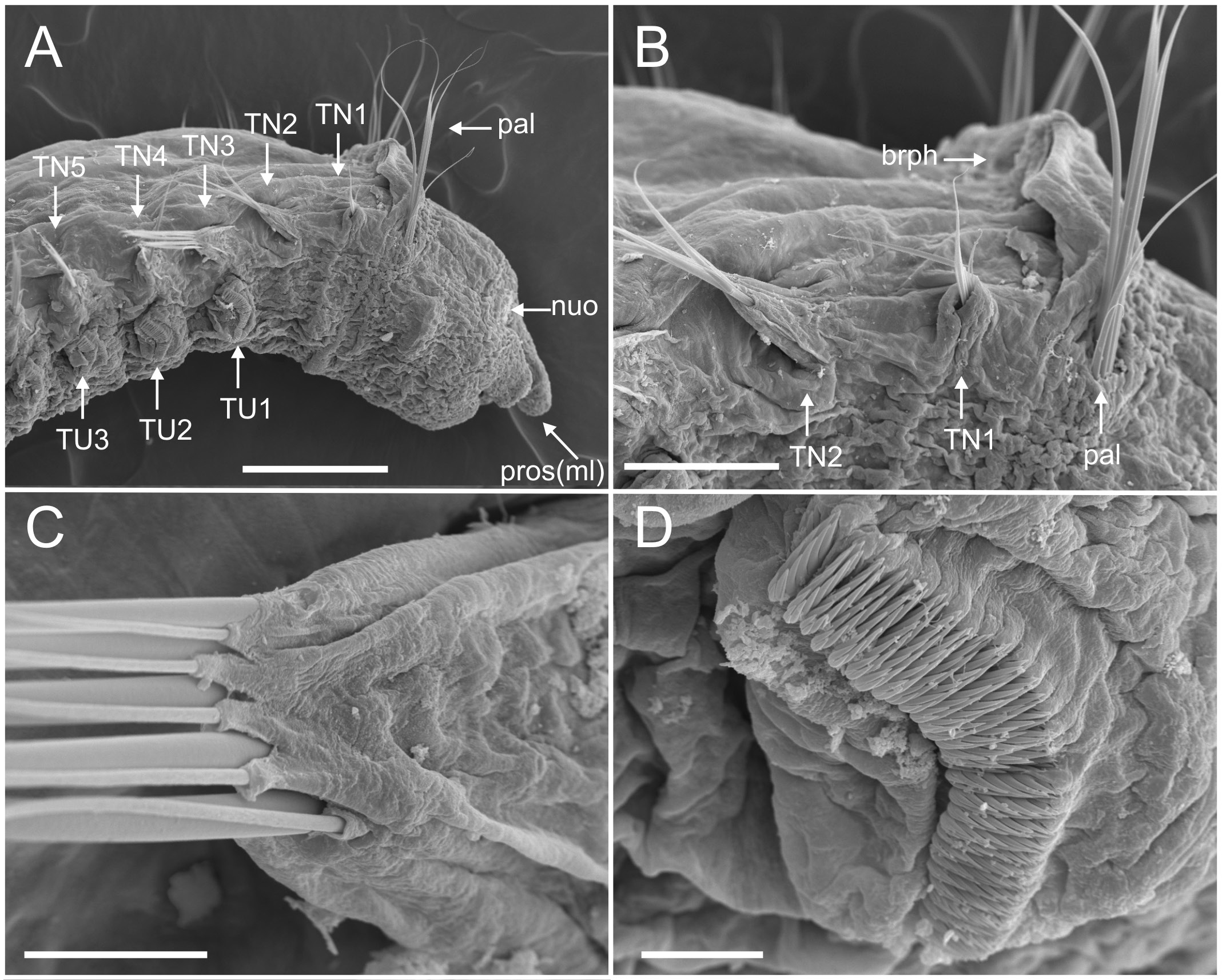
- Ampharete oculicirrata

Scientific classification
- Kingdom: Animalia
- Phylum: Annelida
- Clade: Pleistoannelida
- Clade: Sedentaria
- Order: Terebellida
- Family: Ampharetidae
- Genus: Ampharete
- Species: A. oculicirrata

Binomial name
- Ampharete oculicirrata Parapar, Moreira, and Barnich, 2019

= Ampharete oculicirrata =

Species of Ampharete

Ampharete oculicirrata is a sea worm species of the family Ampharetidae first described in June 2019 after its discovery in the West Shetland Shelf Nature Conservation Marine Protected Area. It was discovered by a team of scientists from Joint Nature Conservation Committee and Marine Scotland Science.

The worm has eyes both on its head and on cirri extending out of its anus and measures between 4–5 mm (0.16–0.20 in) in length.
