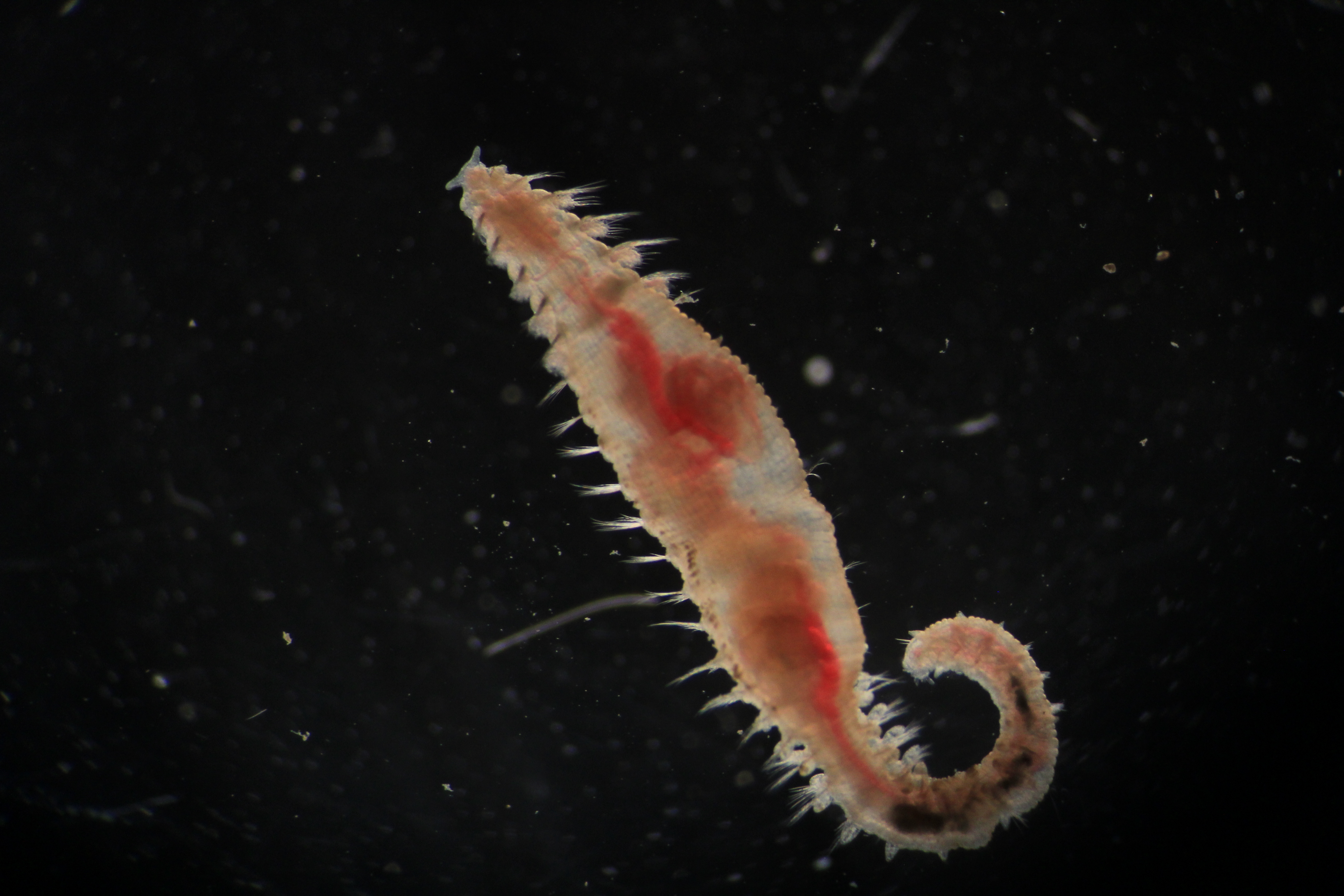
- Scalibregma inflatum (Rathke, 1843)

Scientific classification
- Kingdom: Animalia
- Phylum: Annelida
- Clade: Pleistoannelida
- Clade: Sedentaria
- Order: Opheliida
- Family: Scalibregmatidae
- Genus: Scalibregma; Rathke, 1843

= Scalibregma =

Genus of annelids

Scalibregma is a genus of polychaetes belonging to the family Scalibregmatidae.

The genus has cosmopolitan distribution.

Species:

- Scalibregma abyssorum Hansen, 1879
- Scalibregma australis Blake, 2015
- Scalibregma californicum Blake, 2000
- Scalibregma celticum Mackie, 1991
- Scalibregma hanseni Bakken, Oug & Kongsrud, 2014
- Scalibregma inflatum Rathke, 1843
- Scalibregma robustum Zachs, 1923
- Scalibregma stenocerum (Bertelsen & Weston, 1980)
- Scalibregma wireni Furreg, 1925
