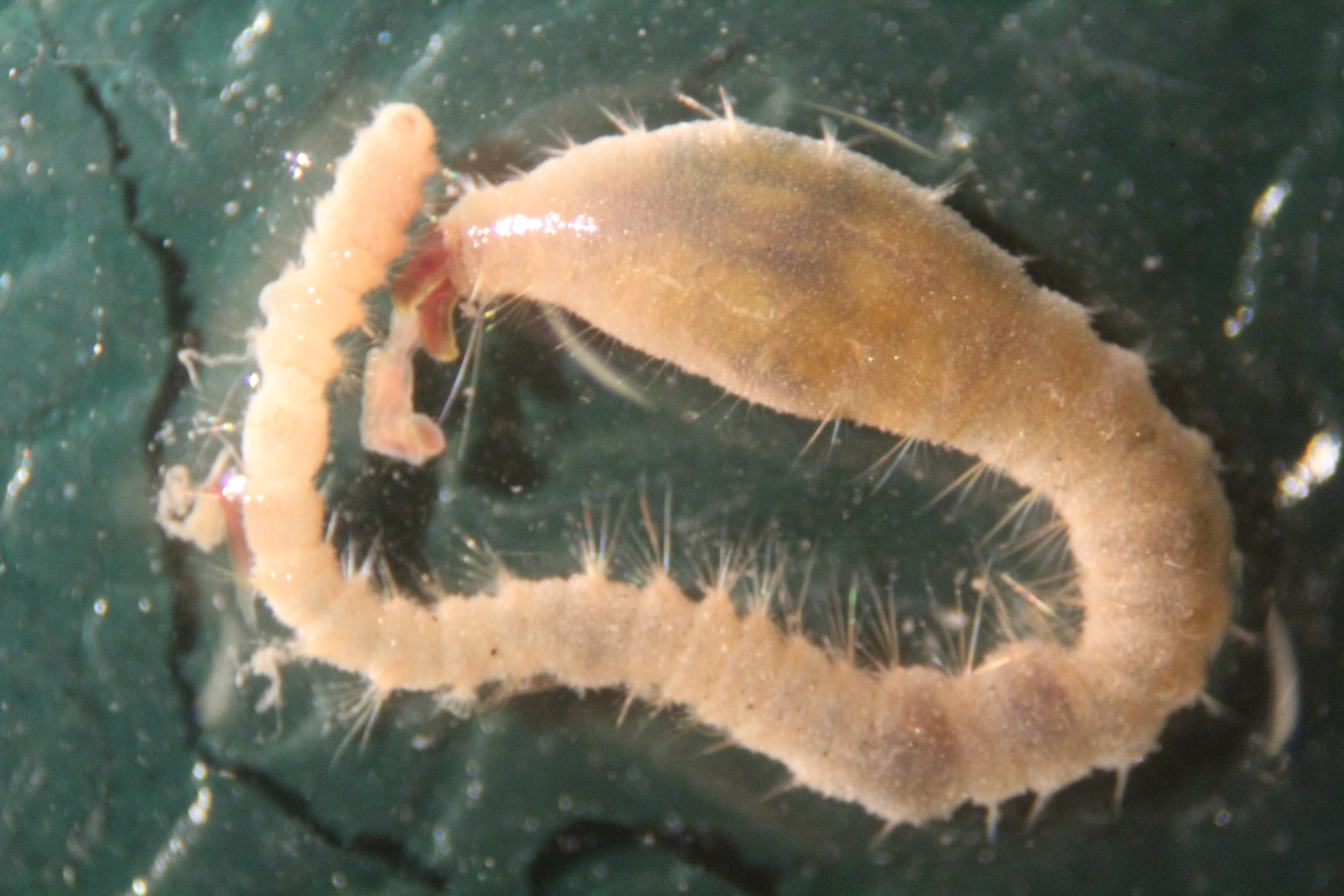

Scientific classification
- Kingdom: Animalia
- Phylum: Annelida
- Clade: Pleistoannelida
- Clade: Sedentaria
- Order: Terebellida
- Family: Flabelligeridae
- Genus: Diplocirrus
- Species: D. glaucus

Binomial name
- Diplocirrus glaucus (Malmgren, 1867)

Synonyms
- Trophonia glauca Malmgren, 1867; Trophonia pallida Sars, 1869

= Diplocirrus glaucus =

Species of annelid worm

Diplocirrus glaucus is a species of marine polychaete found in ocean bottoms often consisting of mud, sand, shells or gravel. It eats detritus and microorganisms. It is found in the Arctic, Mediterranean, and the eastern North Atlantic oceans to a depth of 750 meters.

== Morphology ==
It has a spindle-shaped front body, changing to a more cylindrical form at the back end. The prostomium has four eyes and two long palps. The peristomium has four short, finger-shaped and four longer, threadlike gills. All gills are often retracted into the body. Body colour varies from pearl-grey to silver-white with a length up to 25 mm.

== Ecology ==
It lives on the ocean floor where it digs tunnels that are supported by slime secreted from the worm. Here it feeds on detritus and microorganisms.
