= Scalibregma inflatum =

- Scalibregma inflatum under stereo microscope

Scientific classification
- Kingdom: Animalia
- Phylum: Annelida
- Clade: Pleistoannelida
- Clade: Sedentaria
- Order: Opheliida
- Family: Scalibregmatidae
- Genus: Scalibregma
- Species: S. inflatum

Binomial name
- Scalibregma inflatum Rathke, 1843

Species of annelid worm

Scalibregma inflatum, also known as T headed worm, is a burrowing marine polychaete. It is a cosmopolitan species that can be found from the Arctic to Antarctica, although most probably several species are confounded.

== Morphology ==
Up to 6 cm long with an orange body with 50–60 segments. Body is composed of a wide anterior part of segments 15–17 and a long slim posterior part. Prostomium rectangular shaped with two lateral horns making it appear as a T. peristomium without chaetae. Parapodia small and oval at first increasing in size from segments 16–18. Four pairs of branching gills dorsally on 2-5 segment with chaetae.

== Ecology ==
Mainly found in muddy substrate, but can also be found in sand and between stones and shells. S. inflatum is a deposit feeder. During the spawning period S. inflatum undergoes epitoky.

== Systematics ==
Scalibregma inflatum is found within the polychaete family Scalibregmatidae. The genus Scalibregma is composed of 15 different species.
