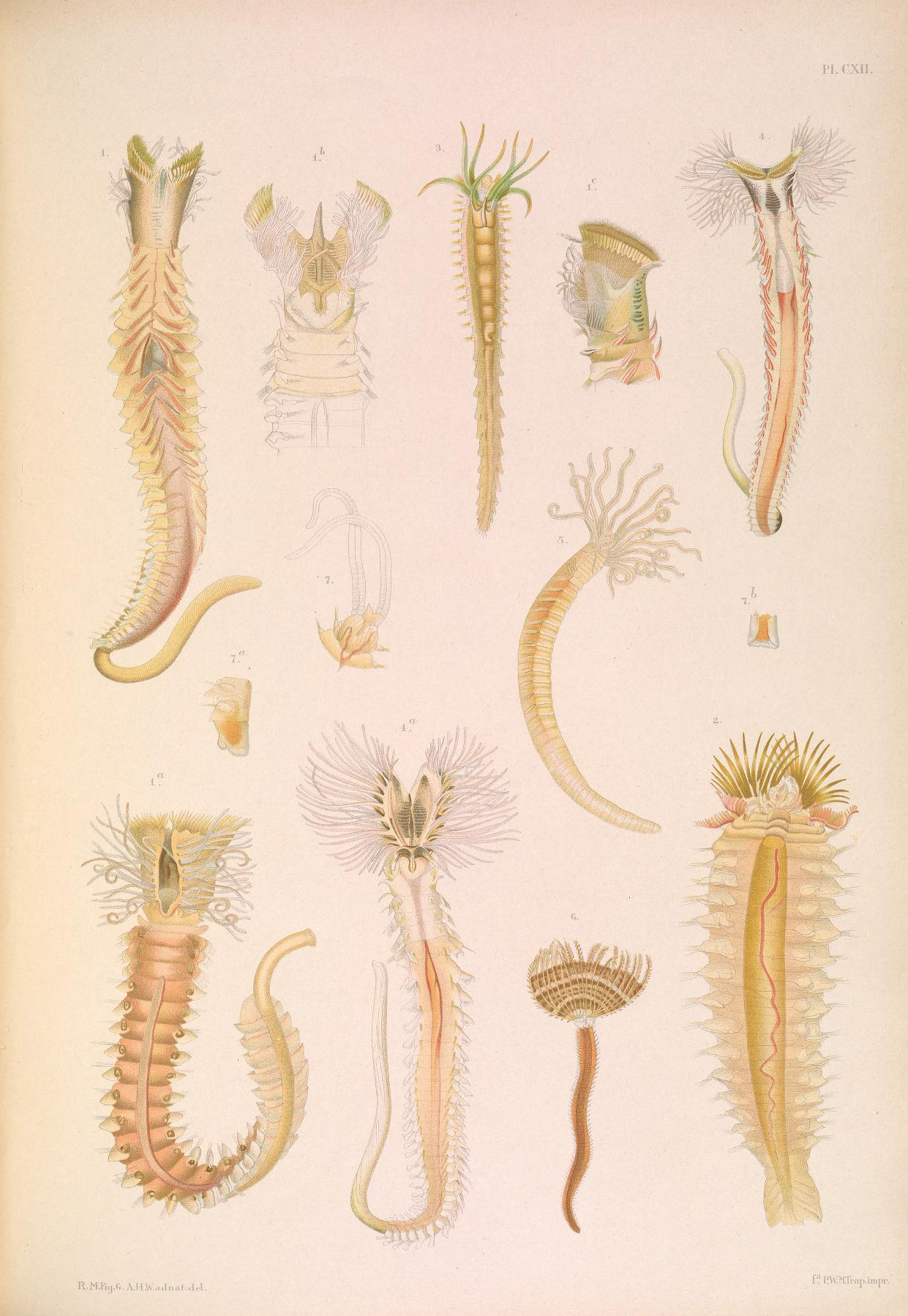
- Ampharete acutifrons

Scientific classification
- Kingdom: Animalia
- Phylum: Annelida
- Clade: Pleistoannelida
- Clade: Sedentaria
- Order: Terebellida
- Family: Ampharetidae
- Subfamily: Ampharetinae; Malmgren, 1866

Genera
- 47 genera (see text)

= Ampharetinae =

Subfamily of annelids

Ampharetinae are a subfamily of terebellid "bristle worm" (class Polychaeta). They are the largest subfamily of the Ampharetidae, of which they contain the great majority of the described genera.

The majority of ampharetines are marine organisms like usual for polychaetes. However, some members of this subfamily are among the rare euryhaline polychaetes, inhabiting brackish and freshwater habitat. They are generally smallish deposit feeders which frequently live in small tubes they build from mud or similar substrate, or burrow in the sand.

== Genera ==
The World Register of Marine Species recognizes the following 47 genera:

- Abderos Schüller & Jirkov, 2013
- Adercodon Mackie, 1994
- Alkmaria Horst, 1919
- Ampharana Hartman, 1967
- Ampharete Malmgren, 1866
- Amphicteis Grube, 1850
- Amythas Benham, 1921
- Amythasides Eliason, 1955
- Andamanella Holthe, 2002
- Anobothrus Levinsen, 1884
- Auchenoplax Ehlers, 1887
- Decemunciger Zottoli, 1982
- Ecamphicteis Fauchald, 1972
- Eclysippe Eliason, 1955
- Emaga Hartman, 1978
- Endecamera Zottoli, 1982
- Eusamythella Hartman, 1971
- Glyphanostomum Levinsen, 1884
- Gnathampharete Desbruyères, 1978
- Grassleia Solis-Weiss, 1993
- Jugamphicteis Fauchald & Hancock, 1981
- Lysippe Malmgren, 1866
- Melinnampharete Annenkova, 1937
- Melinnata Hartman, 1965
- Melinnoides Benham, 1927
- Neopaiwa Hartman & Fauchald, 1971
- Neosabellides Hessle, 1917
- Neosamytha Hartman, 1967
- Orochi Reuscher, Fiege & Imajima, 2015
- Pabits Chamberlin, 1919
- Paedampharete Russell, 1987
- Paiwa Chamberlin, 1919
- Parampharete Hartman, 1967
- Paramphicteis Caullery, 1944
- Paramytha Kongsrud, Eilertsen, Alvestad, Kongshavn & Rapp, 2017
- Phyllampharete Hartman & Fauchald, 1971
- Phyllamphicteis Augener, 1918
- Phyllocomus Grube, 1877
- Samytha Malmgren, 1866
- Samythella Verrill, 1873
- Samythopsis McIntosh, 1885
- Sosane Malmgren, 1866
- Tanseimaruana Imajima, Reuscher & Fiege, 2013
- Watatsumi Reuscher, Fiege & Imajima, 2015
- Weddellia Hartman, 1967
- Ymerana Holthe, 1986
- Zatsepinia Jirkov, 1986
