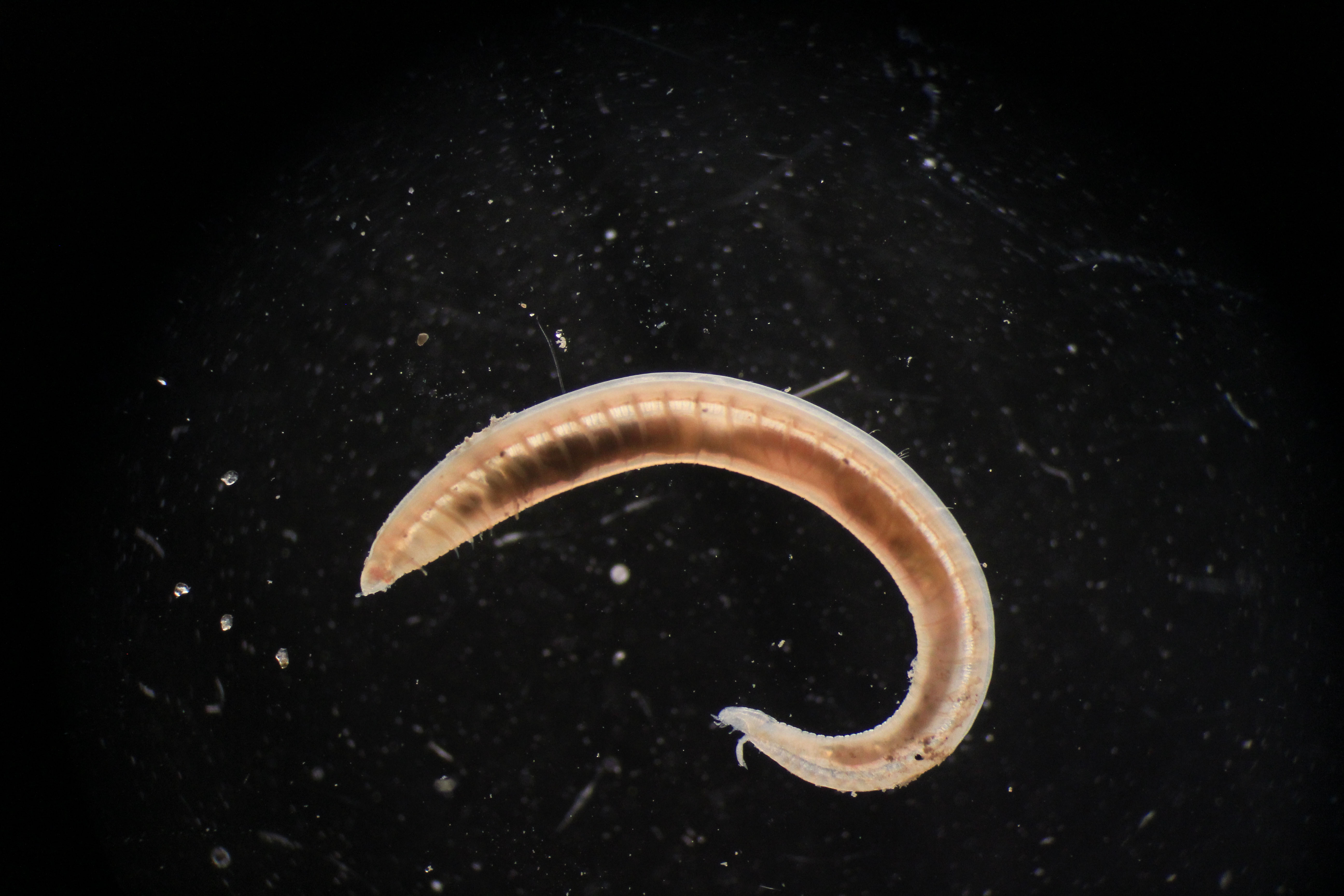
- Ophelina acuminata

Scientific classification
- Domain: Eukaryota
- Kingdom: Animalia
- Phylum: Annelida
- Clade: Pleistoannelida
- Clade: Sedentaria
- Family: Opheliidae
- Genus: Ophelina; Örsted, 1843

= Ophelina =

Genus of annelid worms

Ophelina is a genus of annelids belonging to the family Opheliidae.

The genus has cosmopolitan distribution.

Species:

- Ophelina abranchiata Nhm, 1769
- Ophelina abranchiata Støp-Bowitz, 1948
- Ophelina acuminata Örsted, 1843
- Ophelina adamantea (Kinberg, 1866)
- Ophelina alata Elías, Bremec, Lana & Orensanz, 2003
- Ophelina ammotrypanella Schüller, 2008
- Ophelina aulogastrella (Hartman & Fauchald, 1971)
- Ophelina basicirra Parapar, Moreira & Helgason, 2011
- Ophelina bimensis (Caullery, 1944)
- Ophelina bowitzi Parapar, Moreira & Helgason, 2011
- Ophelina brattegardi Kongsrud, Bakken & Oug, 2011
- Ophelina breviata (Ehlers, 1913)
- Ophelina brevibranchiata (Caullery, 1944)
- Ophelina buitendijki (Horst, 1919)
- Ophelina chaetifera (Hartman, 1965)
- Ophelina cirrosa Schueller, 2008
- Ophelina cordiformis (Caullery, 1944)
- Ophelina curli Wiklund, Neal, Glover, Drennan, Rabone & Dahlgren, 2019
- Ophelina cylindricaudata (Hansen, 1879)
- Ophelina cyprophilia Neave & Glasby, 2013
- Ophelina delapidans (Kinberg, 1866)
- Ophelina dubia
- Ophelina ehlersi (Horst, 1919)
- Ophelina fauveli (Caullery, 1944)
- Ophelina ganae Wiklund, Neal, Glover, Drennan, Rabone & Dahlgren, 2019
- Ophelina gaucha Elías, Bremec, Lana & Orensanz, 2003
- Ophelina gigantea (Rullier, 1965)
- Ophelina grandis (Pillai, 1961)
- Ophelina groenlandica Støp-Bowitz, 1948
- Ophelina gymnopyge (Ehlers, 1908)
- Ophelina hachaensis Augener, 1934
- Ophelina helgolandiae Augener, 1912
- Ophelina juhazi Wiklund, Neal, Glover, Drennan, Rabone & Dahlgren, 2019
- Ophelina kampeni (Horst, 1919)
- Ophelina kinbergii Hansen, 1882
- Ophelina kohni Magalhães, Rizzo & Bailey-Brock, 2019
- Ophelina kuekenthali (Horst, 1919)
- Ophelina kuekenthali (McIntosh, 1908)
- Ophelina langii (Kükenthal, 1887)
- Ophelina longicaudata (Caullery, 1944)
- Ophelina longicirrata Hartmann-Schröder & Parker, 1995
- Ophelina manana Magalhães, Rizzo & Bailey-Brock, 2019
- Ophelina martinezarbizui Wiklund, Neal, Glover, Drennan, Rabone & Dahlgren, 2019
- Ophelina meyerae Wiklund, Neal, Glover, Drennan, Rabone & Dahlgren, 2019
- Ophelina minima Hartmann-Schröder, 1974
- Ophelina modesta Støp-Bowitz, 1958
- Ophelina nematoides (Ehlers, 1913)
- Ophelina norvegica Støp-Bowitz, 1945
- Ophelina nunnallyi Wiklund, Neal, Glover, Drennan, Rabone & Dahlgren, 2019
- Ophelina opisthobranchiata Wirén, 1901
- Ophelina pallida
- Ophelina profunda (Caullery, 1944)
- Ophelina pygocirrata (Ehlers, 1920)
- Ophelina remigera (Ehlers, 1918)
- Ophelina robusta Schüller, 2008
- Ophelina scaphigera (Ehlers, 1900)
- Ophelina setigera (Hartman, 1978)
- Ophelina sibogae (Caullery, 1944)
- Ophelina syringopyge (Ehlers, 1901)
- Ophelina tessellata Neave & Glasby, 2013
