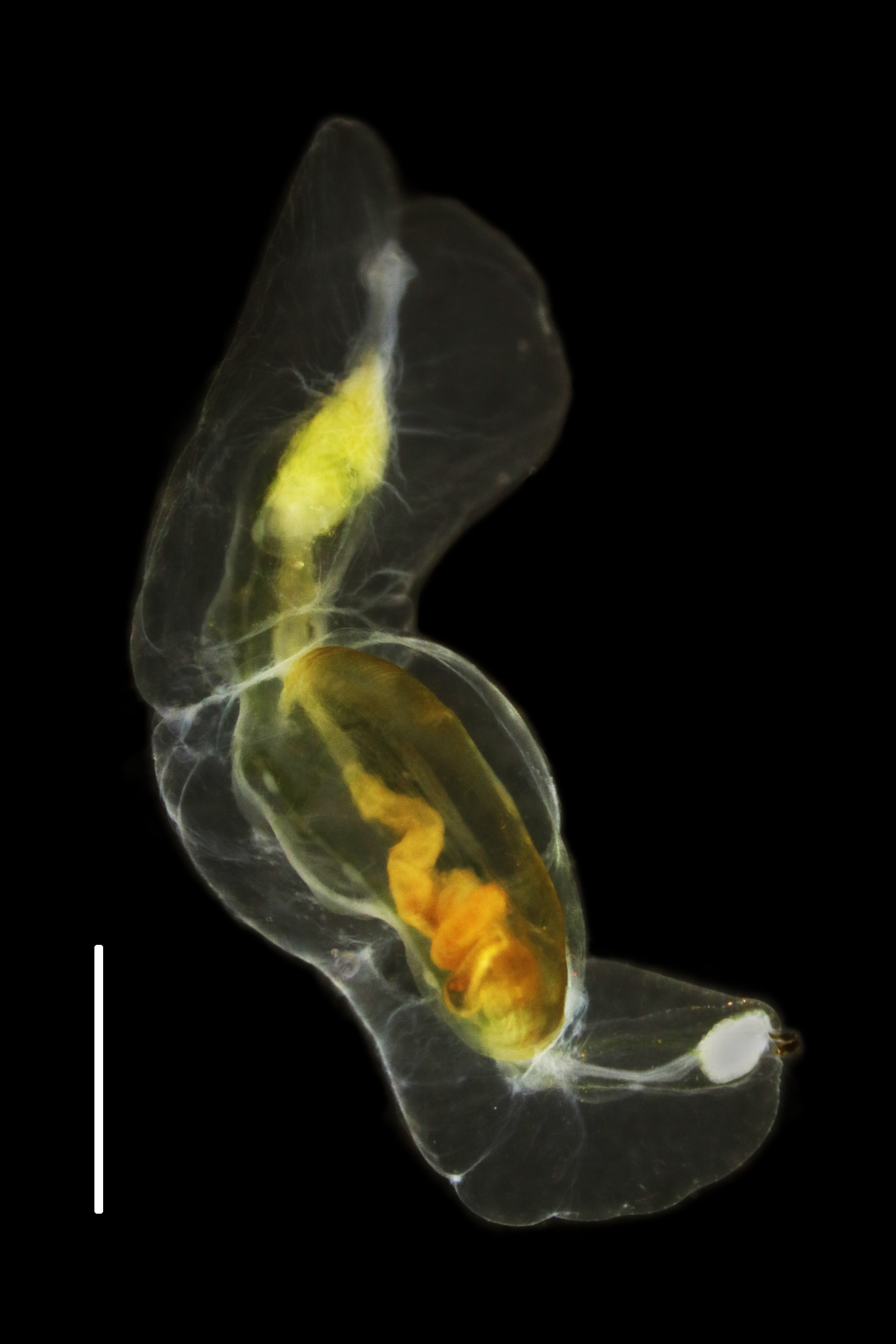

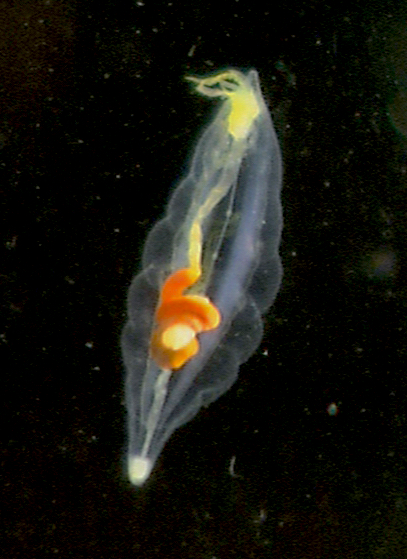

Scientific classification
- Kingdom: Animalia
- Phylum: Annelida
- Clade: Pleistoannelida
- Clade: Sedentaria
- Order: Terebellida
- Family: Flabelligeridae
- Genus: Poeobius; Heath, 1930
- Species: P. meseres

Binomial name
- Poeobius meseres Heath, 1930

= Poeobius =

Species of annelid worm

Poeobius is a genus of marine polychaete worm. It contains the single species Poeobius meseres, or balloon worm. This is a common and abundant resident in the midwater around the mesopelagic and bathypelagic zones, especially in Monterey Bay. They can be found at around 300-2,500 m (980-8,200 ft) depth from Japan to Alaska to the Gulf of California, and have also been reported in South America.

== Description ==
The species is a passive detritivore, using a mucus net to capture marine snow as it hangs neutrally-buoyant midwater. The gelatinous body consist of 11 poorly defined segments with no setae or external segmentation. Only two septa remains, which divides the coelomic cavity into an anterior, middle and posterior coelom. There is no serial duplication of the internal organs. They have a maximum size of 36 mm (1.5 in).
