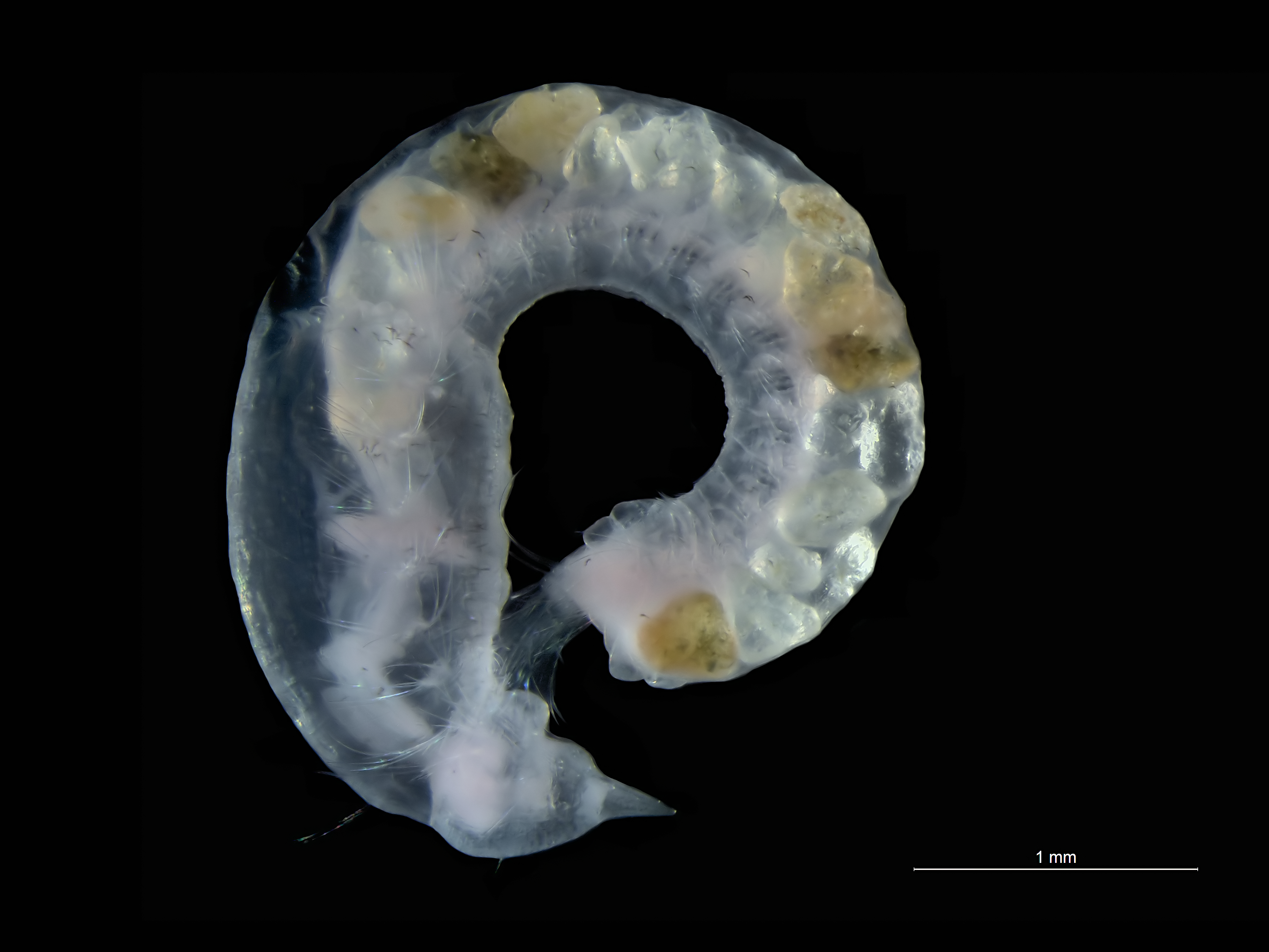
- Euzonus flabelligerus

Scientific classification
- Kingdom: Animalia
- Phylum: Annelida
- Clade: Pleistoannelida
- Clade: Sedentaria
- Order: Opheliida
- Family: Opheliidae; Malmgren, 1867

= Opheliidae =

Family of annelids

Opheliidae is a family of small, annelid worms. Some of the genera, like Armandia, Ophelina and Polyophthalmus, have lost their circular muscles. The Opheliidae family of polychaete; marine annelid worms, play an essential role in marine ecosystems as “deposit feeders” that aid in the recycling of nutrients and sediment mixing in muddle and sandy habitats. Due to their distinctive adaptations that include streamlined bodies and specialized muscles they can burrow in various marine environments.

Worms in the Opheliidae family generally show characteristics of having a smooth body, a ventral (front) crease, few flaps on their sides and a pointed head to help them travel through mud and sand. Overall they specialize in burrowing and consuming sediment particles.

== Genera ==
The family consist of the following genera:

- Ammotrypanella
- Antiobactrum
- Armandia
- Dindymenides
- Euzonus
- Kesun
- Lobochesis
- Ophelia
- Ophelina
- Polyophthalmus
- Pygophelia
- Tachytrypane
- Thoracophelia
- Travisia
