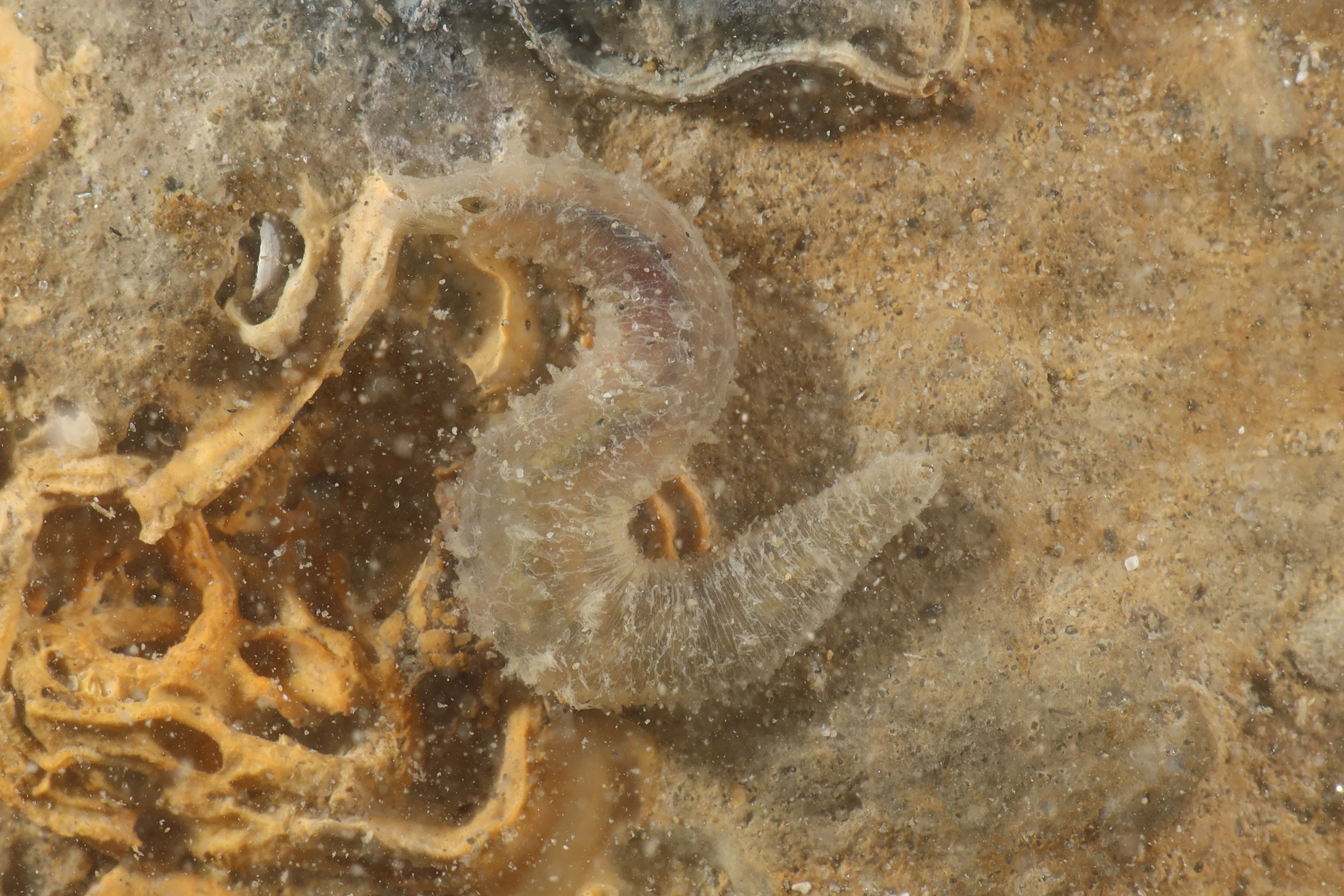
- Flabelligera affinis

Scientific classification
- Kingdom: Animalia
- Phylum: Annelida
- Clade: Pleistoannelida
- Clade: Sedentaria
- Order: Terebellida
- Family: Flabelligeridae
- Genus: Flabelligera; Sars, 1829

Type species
- Flabelligera affinis Sars 1829

= Flabelligera =

Genus of polychaetes

Flabelligera is a genus of polychaetes in the family Flabelligeridae. Species are common around the world, in both temperate and cold waters. Flabelligera species have long, club-like papillae, which are encased in a smooth mucus sheath. They also have a distinct cephalic cage (a fan-like arrangement of chaetae around the head), and hooked neurochaetae (ventral chaetae) which they use to hold onto rocks.

Flabelligera species are preyed on by a number of fish. They are most often found in waters with a temperature between 6.3 and 12.9 °C (43.3 and 55.2 °F).

== Species list ==
- Flabelligera affinis, the flabby bristle-worm Sars, 1829
- Flabelligera bicolor (Schmarda, 1824)
- Flabelligera biscayensis Kolmer, 1985
- Flabelligera bophortica Annenkova-Chlopina, 1924
- Flabelligera diplochaetus (Otto, 1820)
- Flabelligera gourdoni Gravier, 1906
- Flabelligera grubei (Webster & Benedict, 1887)
- Flabelligera haswelli Salazar-Vallejo, 2012
- Flabelligera infundabularis, the sheathed bristle-cage worm Johnson, 1901
- Flabelligera japonica Jimi, Hasegawa, Taru, Oya, Kohtsuka, Tsuchida, Fujiwara & Woo, 2022
- Flabelligera kaimeiae Jimi, Hasegawa, Taru, Oya, Kohtsuka, Tsuchida, Fujiwara & Woo, 2022
- Flabelligera kajiharai Jimi, Hasegawa, Taru, Oya, Kohtsuka, Tsuchida, Fujiwara & Woo, 2022
- Flabelligera kozaensis Jimi, Hasegawa, Taru, Oya, Kohtsuka, Tsuchida, Fujiwara & Woo, 2022
- Flabelligera luctator (Stimpson, 1855)
- Flabelligera multipapillata Hartmann-Schröder, 1965
- Flabelligera mundata Gravier, 1906
- Flabelligera nuniezi Salazar-Vallejo, 2012
- Flabelligera orensanzi Salazar-Vallejo, 2012
- Flabelligera pennigera Ehlers, 1908
- Flabelligera pergamentacea Ehlers, 1913
- Flabelligera picta Ehlers, 1913
- Flabelligera salazarae Salazar-Vallejo, 2012
- Flabelligera sekii Jimi, Hasegawa, Taru, Oya, Kohtsuka, Tsuchida, Fujiwara & Woo, 2022
- Flabelligera vaginifera (Rathke, 1843)
