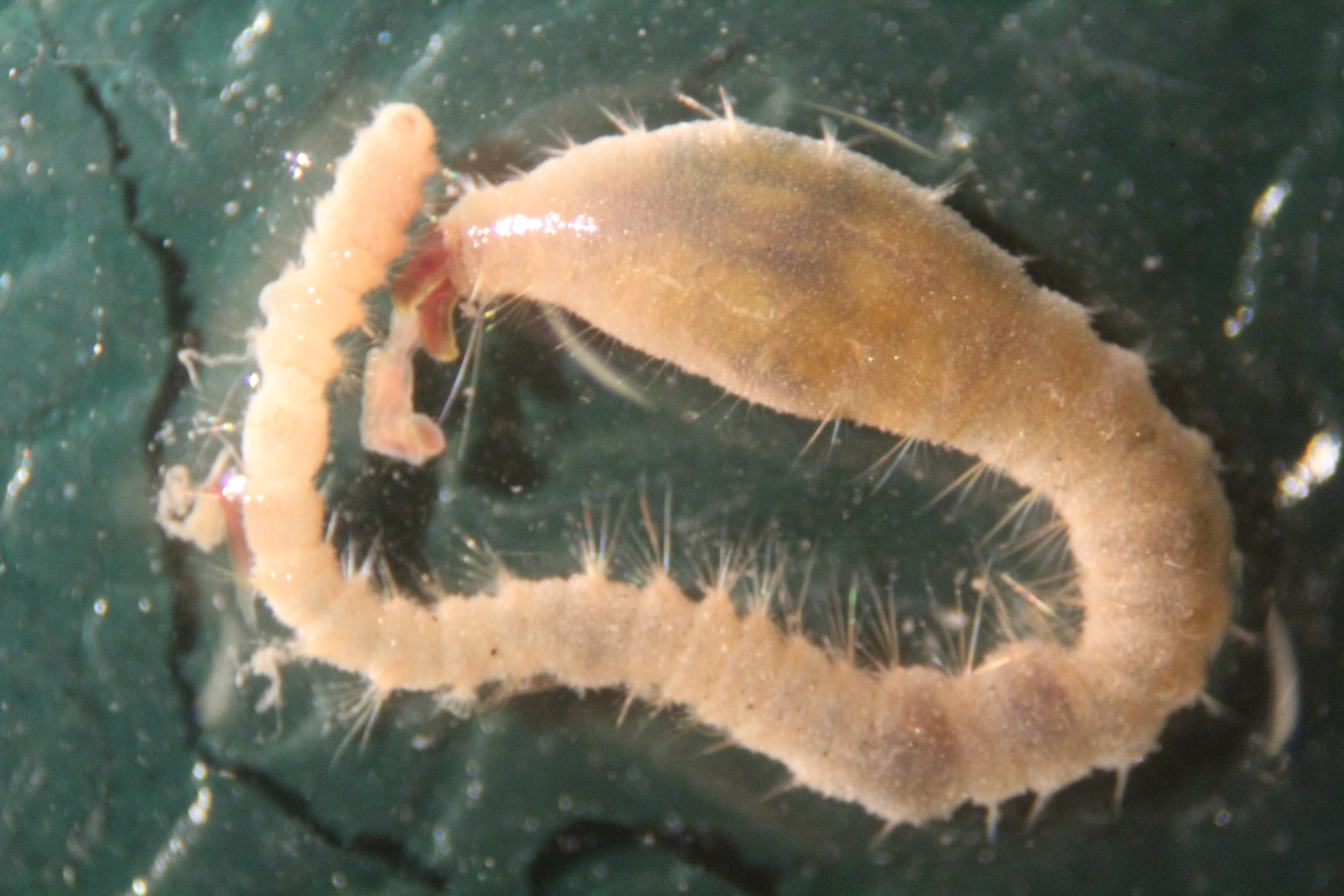
- Diplocirrus glaucus

Scientific classification
- Kingdom: Animalia
- Phylum: Annelida
- Clade: Pleistoannelida
- Clade: Sedentaria
- Order: Terebellida
- Family: Flabelligeridae
- Genus: Diplocirrus; Haase, 1915

= Diplocirrus =

Genus of annelid worms

Diplocirrus is a genus of annelids belonging to the family Flabelligeridae.

The genus has cosmopolitan distribution.

Species:

- Diplocirrus acafi Teixeira, Rizzo & Santos, 2015
- Diplocirrus asamushiensis Jimi, Fujiwara & Kajihara, 2017
- Diplocirrus branchiatus (Rullier, 1965)
- Diplocirrus capensis Day, 1961
- Diplocirrus erythroporus Gallardo, 1968
- Diplocirrus glaucus (Malmgren, 1867)
- Diplocirrus imajimai Jimi, Fujiwara & Kajihara, 2017
- Diplocirrus incognitus Darbyshire & Mackie, 2009
- Diplocirrus kudenovi Salazar-Vallejo & Buzhinskaja, 2011
- Diplocirrus mamoi Jimi, Fujiwara & Kajihara, 2017
- Diplocirrus micans Fauchald, 1972
- Diplocirrus nicolaji (Buzhinskaja, 1994)
- Diplocirrus normani McIntosh, 1908
- Diplocirrus ohtsukai Jimi, Fujiwara & Kajihara, 2017
- Diplocirrus rugosus Teixeira, Rizzo & Santos, 2015
- Diplocirrus salazarvallejoi Teixeira, Rizzo & Santos, 2015
- Diplocirrus seisuiae Jimi, Fujiwara & Kajihara, 2017
- Diplocirrus stopbowitzi Darbyshire & Mackie, 2009
- Diplocirrus tohokuensis Jimi, Fujiwara & Kajihara, 2017
- Diplocirrus toyoshioae Jimi, Fujiwara & Kajihara, 2017
