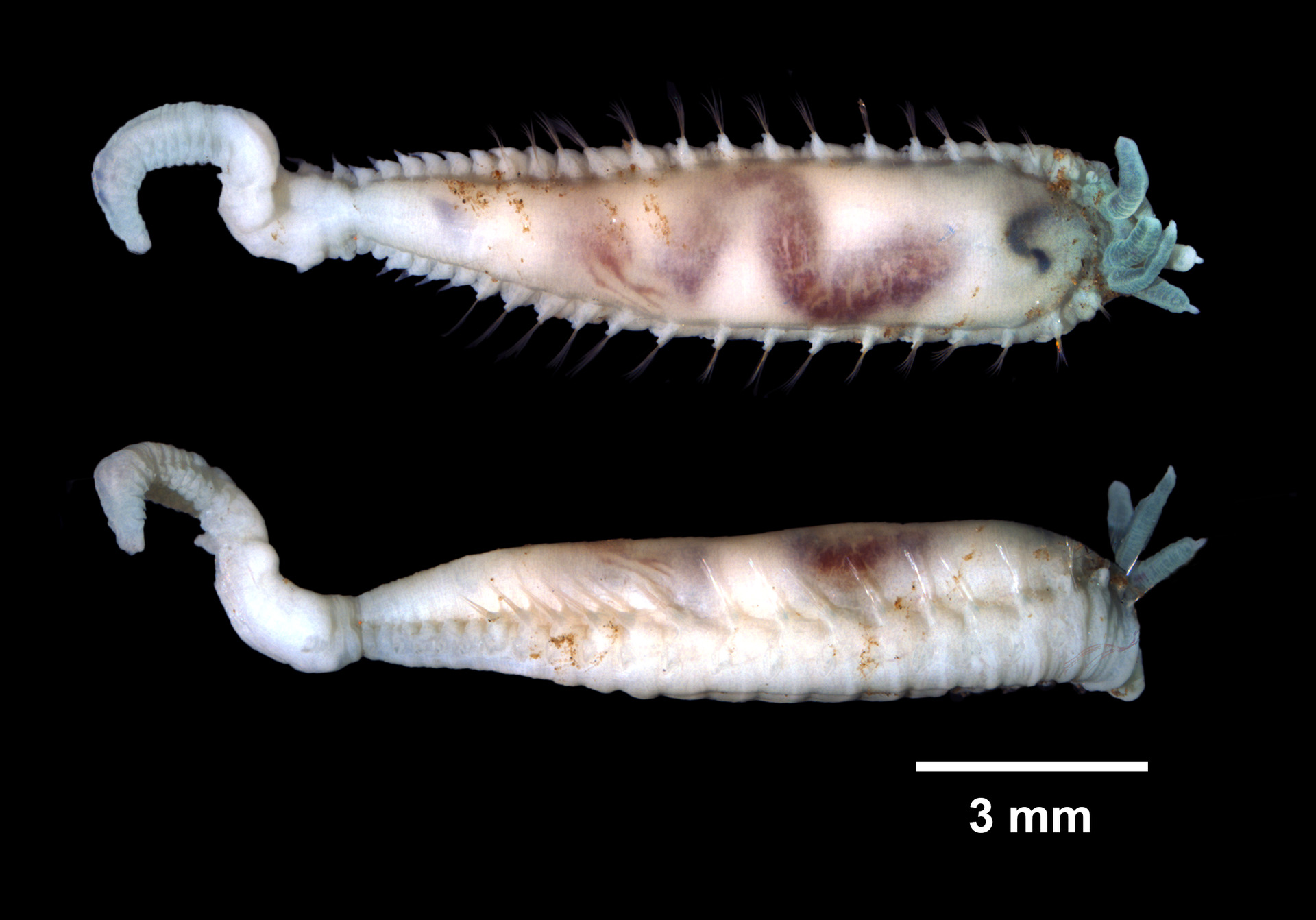

Scientific classification
- Domain: Eukaryota
- Kingdom: Animalia
- Phylum: Annelida
- Clade: Pleistoannelida
- Clade: Sedentaria
- Order: Terebellida
- Family: Ampharetidae
- Subfamily: Amphicteinae; Holthe, 1986

Type genus
- Amphicteis Grube, 1850

= Amphicteinae =

Subfamily of polychaetes

Amphicteinae is a subfamily of polychaete worms in the family Ampharetidae. It was originally established as a tribe, with eight genera, but was elevated to subfamily-level with a reduced number of genera in 2020. Two species, Hypaniola kowatewskii and Hypania invalida, are known to feed on blue-green algae.

== Genera ==
The subfamily comprises the following genera:

- Hobsonia Banse, 1979
- Hypania Ostroumoff, 1897
- Hypaniola Annenkova, 1927
- Noanelia Desbruyeres & Laubier, 1977
