= Mazopherusa =

Mazopherusa Temporal range: Pennsylvanian

Scientific classification
- Domain: Eukaryota
- Kingdom: Animalia
- Phylum: Annelida
- Clade: Pleistoannelida
- Clade: Sedentaria
- Order: Terebellida
- Family: Flabelligeridae
- Genus: †Mazopherusa; Hay, 2002
- Species: †M. prinosi

Binomial name
- †Mazopherusa prinosi Hay, 2002

Extinct genus of annelid worms

Mazopherusa is a genus of flabelligerid annelid worm, known only from the Pennsylvanian Mazon Creek lagerstatte; it is the only bona fide fossil member of the family.
