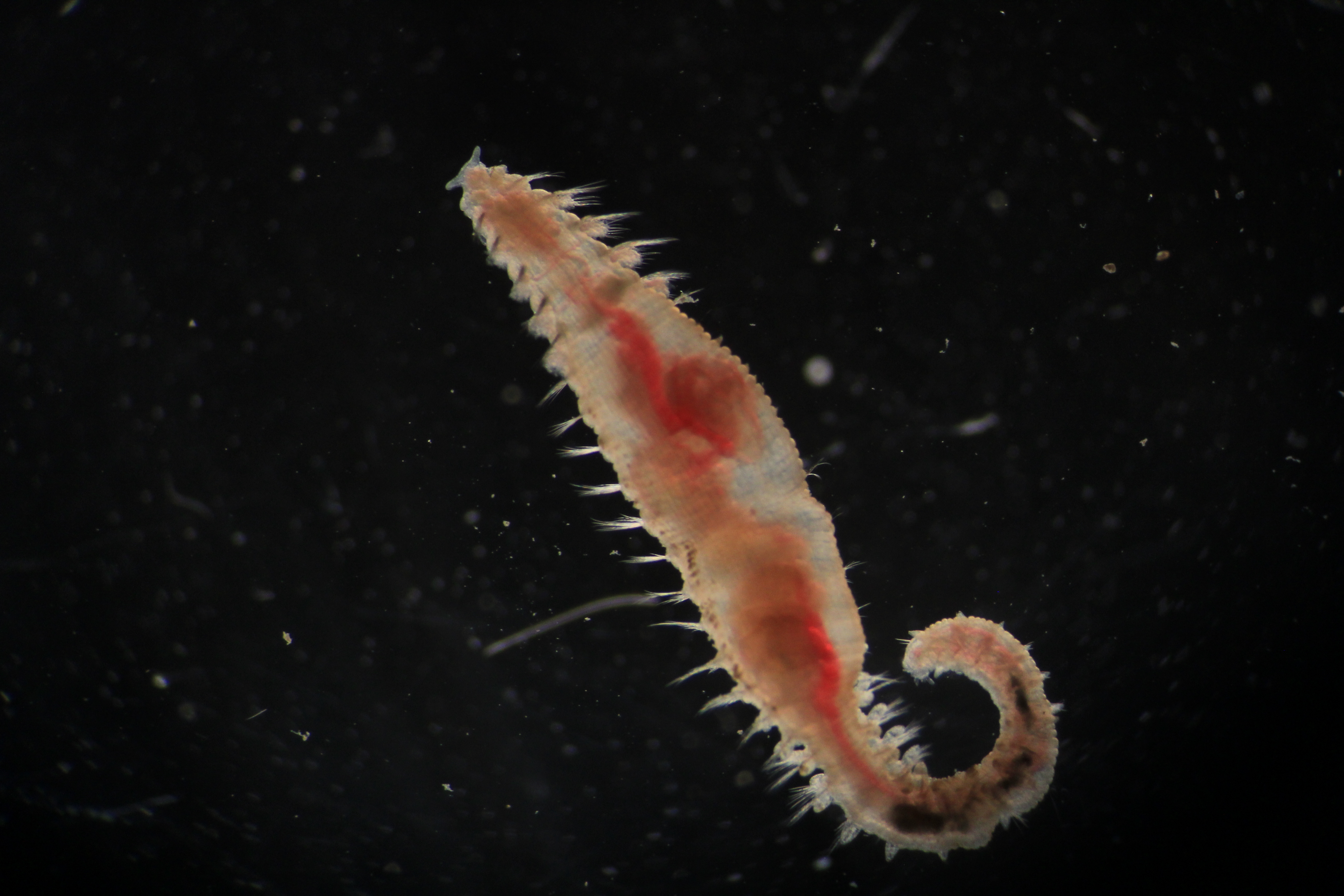
- Scalibregma inflatum

Scientific classification
- Kingdom: Animalia
- Phylum: Annelida
- Clade: Pleistoannelida
- Clade: Sedentaria
- Order: Opheliida
- Family: Scalibregmatidae; Malmgren, 1867

= Scalibregmatidae =

Family of annelids

Scalibregmatidae is a family of polychaetes belonging to the order Opheliida, and was first described by Anders Johan Malmgren in 1867.

== Genera ==
Accepted genera:

- Asclerocheilus Ashworth, 1901
- Axiokebuita Pocklington & Fournier, 1987
- Hyboscolex Schmarda, 1861
- Lipobranchius Cunningham & Ramage, 1888
- Mucibregma Fauchald & Hancock, 1981
- Oligobregma Kudenov & Blake, 1978
- Parasclerocheilus Fauvel, 1928
- Polyphysia Quatrefages, 1866
- Proscalibregma Hartman, 1967
- Pseudoscalibregma Ashworth, 1901
- Scalibregma Rathke, 1843
- Scalibregmella Hartman & Fauchald, 1971
- Scalibregmides Hartmann-Schröder, 1965
- Sclerobregma Rathke, 1843
- Sclerocheilus Grube, 1863
- Speleobregma Bertelsen, 1986
