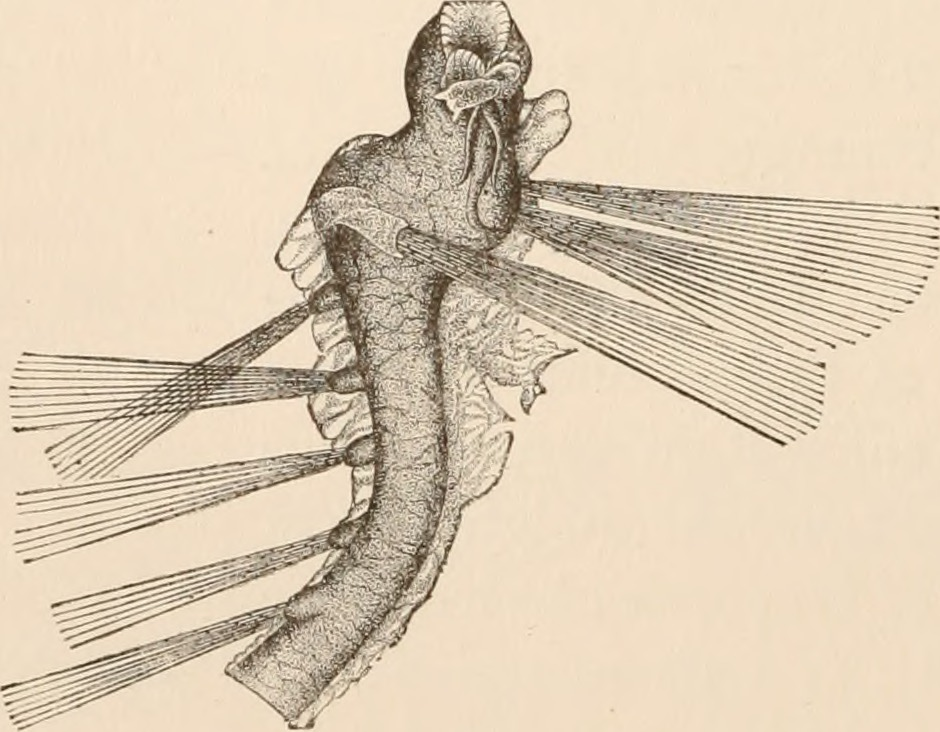
- Buskiella abyssorum

Scientific classification
- Domain: Eukaryota
- Kingdom: Animalia
- Phylum: Annelida
- Clade: Pleistoannelida
- Clade: Sedentaria
- Order: Terebellida
- Family: Flotidae; Buzhinskaja, 1996

Genera
- Buskiella; Flota ?

= Flotidae =

Family of annelids

Flotidae is a family of pelagic polychaete worms, sometimes synonymized with Flabelligeridae, which they closely resemble. Other sources consider them the sister taxon to Flabelligeridae and closely allied to the latter group.

== Taxonomy ==
Flotidae originally contained one genus, Flota, from which it derives its name, but a 2007 study also placed Buskiella in the family, and moved all (two) Flota species to Buskiella. The family would thus contains one genus and three species, listed below.

- Buskiella abyssorum McIntoch, 1885
- Buskiella flabelligera (Hartman, 1967) formerly Flota flabelligera
- Buskiella vitjasi (Buzhinskaja, 1977) formerly Flota vitjasi

== Similarities and differences with Flabelligeridae ==
A 2008 paper analyzing the phylogenetics of flotid polychaetes found that flotids are nested within Flabelligeridae. However, defenders of the separate family status of Flotidae cite several morphological differences.
