= Armandia (annelid) =

Scientific classification
- Kingdom: Animalia
- Phylum: Annelida
- Clade: Pleistoannelida
- Clade: Sedentaria
- Order: Opheliida
- Family: Opheliidae
- Genus: Armandia; Filippi, 1861

Genus of annelid worms

Armandia is a genus of polychaetes belonging to the family Opheliidae.

The genus has cosmopolitan distribution.

Species:

- Armandia agilis (Andrews, 1891)
- Armandia amakusaensis Saito, Tamaki & Imajima, 2000
- Armandia andamana Eibye-Jacobsen, 2002
- Armandia bifida Parapar & Moreira, 2015
- Armandia bilobata Hartmann-Schröder, 1986
- Armandia bipapillata Hartmann-Schröder, 1974
- Armandia brevis (Moore, 1906)
- Armandia broomensis Hartmann-Schröder, 1979
- Armandia buccina Moreira & Parapar, 2017
- Armandia casuarina Moreira & Parapar, 2017
- Armandia circumpapillata Magalhães, Rizzo & Bailey-Brock, 2019
- Armandia cirrhosa Filippi, 1861
- Armandia dolio Parapar & Moreira, 2015
- Armandia exigua Kükenthal, 1887
- Armandia filibranchia Parapar & Moreira, 2015
- Armandia garretti Magalhães, Rizzo & Bailey-Brock, 2019
- Armandia hossfeldi Hartmann-Schröder, 1956
- Armandia ilhabelae Hartmann-Schröder, 1956
- Armandia intermedia Fauvel, 1902
- Armandia laminosa Parapar & Moreira, 2015
- Armandia lanceolata Willey, 1905
- Armandia leptocirris (Grube, 1878)
- Armandia loboi Elías & Bremec, 2003
- Armandia maculata (Webster, 1884)
- Armandia mariacapae Moreira & Parapar, 2017
- Armandia melanura Gravier, 1905
- Armandia nonpapillata Jones, 1962
- Armandia opisthoculata Moreira & Parapar, 2017
- Armandia paraintermedia Parapar & Moreira, 2015
- Armandia parva Moreira & Parapar, 2017
- Armandia polyophthalma Kükenthal, 1887
- Armandia salvadoriana Hartmann-Schröder, 1956
- Armandia sampadae Gopal, Jaleel, Parameswaran & Vijayan, 2016
- Armandia secundariopapillata Hartmann-Schröder, 1984
- Armandia simodaensis Takahashi, 1938
- Armandia sinaitica Amoureux, 1983
- Armandia tubulata Parapar & Moreira, 2015
- Armandia weissenbornii Kükenthal, 1887
