= Pierre Fauvel =

French zoologist

Pierre Louis André Fauvel (8 October 1866 in Cherbourg – 12 September 1958 in Angers) was a French zoologist, who specialized in the study of polychaetes.

He worked as a préparateur of zoology at the faculty of sciences in Caen, and in 1897 received his doctorate at the Sorbonne with a thesis on Ampharetidae. During the same year, he became a professor of zoology at the Université Catholique de l'Ouest in Angers, where he remained until his retirement in 1951.

The polychaete family Fauveliopsidae bears his name, as does the genus Fauveliopsis. Along with his many writings on Polychaeta, he was also the author of publications in the fields of physiology and dietetics.

His zoological author abbreviation is Fauvel.

== Selected works ==
- Recherches sur les Ampharétiens, 1897 – Research on Ampharetidae.
- Sur les stades Clymenides et Branchiomaldane des arenicoles, 1899 – On the genera Clymenides and Branchiomaldane of Arenicolidae.
- Polychètes errantes, 1923 – Wandering polychaetes.
- Polychètes sédentaires; addenda aux errantes, archiandélides, myzostomaires, 1927 – Sedentary polychaetes.
- Annélides polychètes de Nouvelle-Calédonie et des îles Gambier, 1947 – Polychaete annelids of New Caledonia and the Gambier Islands.
- Annelida Polychaeta 1953, in: "The Fauna of India".

== See also ==
- Taxa named by Pierre Fauvel
