= Brada (annelid) =

Scientific classification
- Kingdom: Animalia
- Phylum: Annelida
- Clade: Pleistoannelida
- Clade: Sedentaria
- Order: Terebellida
- Family: Flabelligeridae
- Genus: Brada; Stimpson, 1853

Genus of annelid worms

Brada is a genus of polychaetes belonging to the family Flabelligeridae.

The genus has cosmopolitan distribution.

Species:

- Brada annenkovae Buzhinskaja, 2001
- Brada arctica Annenkova-Chlopina, 1922
- Brada bransfieldia Hartman, 1967
- Brada brevis Hartman, 1967
- Brada ferruginea Gallardo, 1968
- Brada granosa Stimpson, 1853
- Brada granulosa Hansen, 1880
- Brada incrustata Støp-Bowitz, 1948
- Brada inhabilis (Rathke, 1843)
- Brada kudenovi Salazar-Vallejo, 2017
- Brada mammillata Grube, 1877
- Brada marchilensis Hartmann-Schröder, 1965
- Brada nuda Annenkova-Chlopina, 1922
- Brada ochotensis Annenkova-Chlopina, 1922
- Brada pluribranchiata (Moore, 1923)
- Brada rugosa (Hansen, 1882)
- Brada sachalina Annenkova-Chlopina, 1922
- Brada strelzovi Jirkov & Filippova, 2001
- Brada sublaevis Stimpson, 1853
- Brada talehsapensis Fauvel, 1932
- Brada tzetlini Jirkov & Filippova, 2001
- Brada verrucosa Chamberlin, 1919
- Brada whiteavesii McIntosh, 1885
