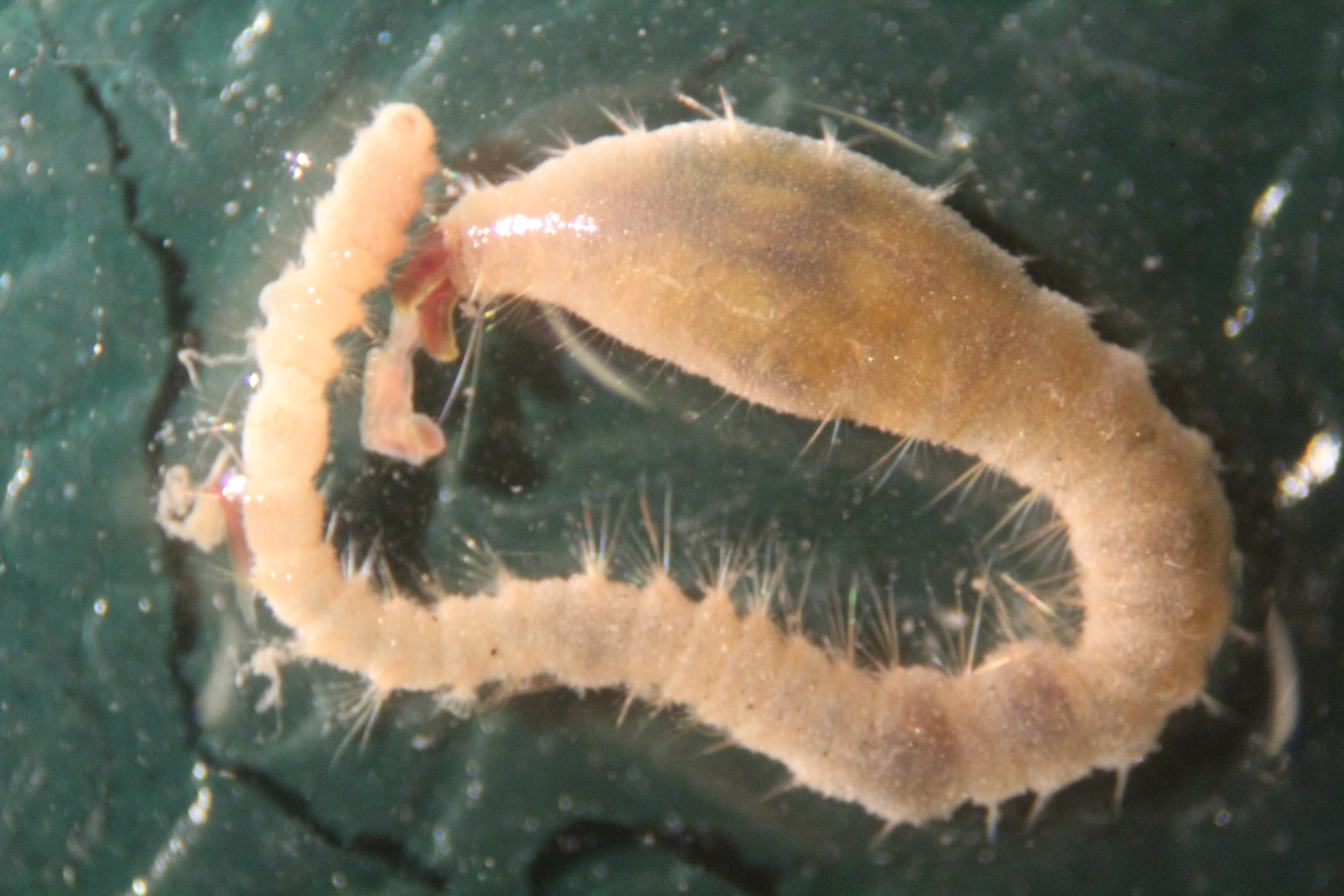
- Diplocirrus glaucus

Scientific classification
- Domain: Eukaryota
- Kingdom: Animalia
- Phylum: Annelida
- Clade: Pleistoannelida
- Clade: Sedentaria
- Order: Terebellida
- Suborder: Cirratuliformia
- Family: Flabelligeridae; Saint-Joseph, 1894

Type genus
- Flabelligera Sars, 1829

Synonyms
- Poeobiidae Heath, 1930; Flotidae Buzhinskaja, 1996 (debated)

= Flabelligeridae =

Flabelligeridae Temporal range: Recent

Family of annelid worms

Flabelligeridae is a family of polychaete worms, known as bristle-cage worms, notable for their cephalic cage: long slender chaetae forming a fan-like arrangement surrounding the eversible (able to be turned inside-out) head. Unlike many polychaetes, they also have large, pigmented, complex eyes.

== Habitat ==
These worms live under stones and are known to burrow into sand. They have a cosmopolitan distribution and live in a variety of marine habitats, from the deep sea to shallow coastal regions.

== Subdivisions ==
- Annenkova Salazar-Vallejo, 2012
- Brada Stimpson, 1854
- Bradabyssa Hartman, 1967
- Daylithos Salazar-Vallejo, 2012
- Diplocirrus Haase, 1915
- Flabegraviera Salazar-Vallejo, 2012
- Flabehlersia Salazar-Vallejo, 2012
- Flabelliderma Hartman, 1969
- Flabelligera Sars, 1829
- Flabesymbios Salazar-Vallejo, 2012
- Ilyphagus Chamberlin, 1919
- †Mazopherusa (?) Hay, 2002
- Pherusa Oken, 1807
- Piromis Kinberg, 1867
- Poeobius Heath, 1930
- Pycnoderma Grube, 1877
- Semiodera Chamberlin, 1919
- Stylarioides Delle Chiaje, 1831 (includes Coppingeria Haswell, 1892; fide Salazar-Vallejo 2011)
- Therochaeta Chamberlin, 1919
- Treadwellius Salazar-Vallejo, 2011
- Trophoniella Hartman, 1959 (includes Therochaetella Hartman, 1967)

The first species was Amphridite plumosa, described from Norway. Flabelligerids were placed in various similar polychaete families until Saint-Joseph erected the family (under the name Flabelligeriens) in 1894.

Mazopherusa is a possible fossil example from the Carboniferous; other fossil material is only dubiously assigned to the family. The Cambrian Iotuba also may belong to the family, however it also appears similar to Acrocirridae.
