= Brada-Rybníček =

- Municipality
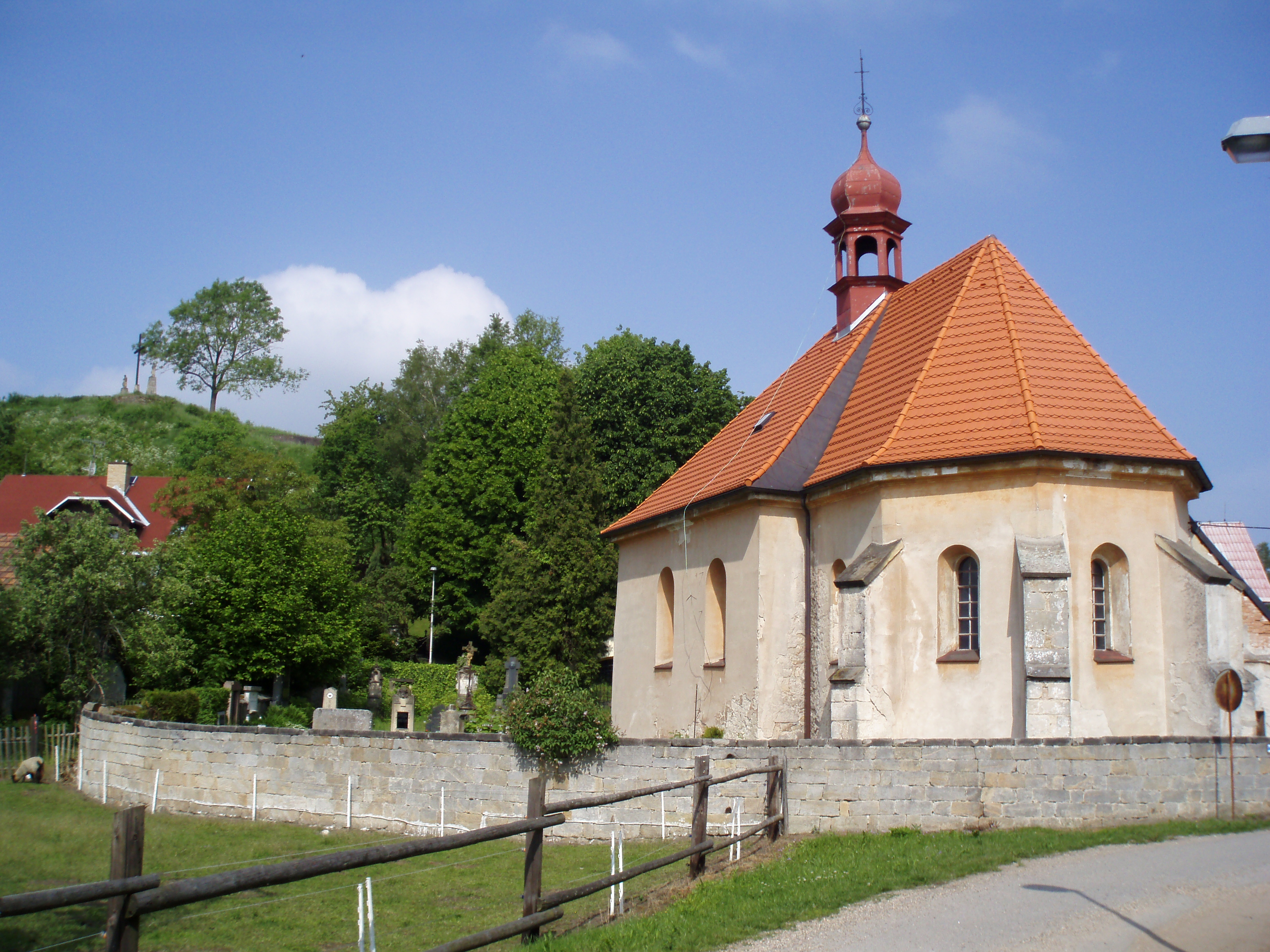
- Church of Saint Bartholomew in Brada

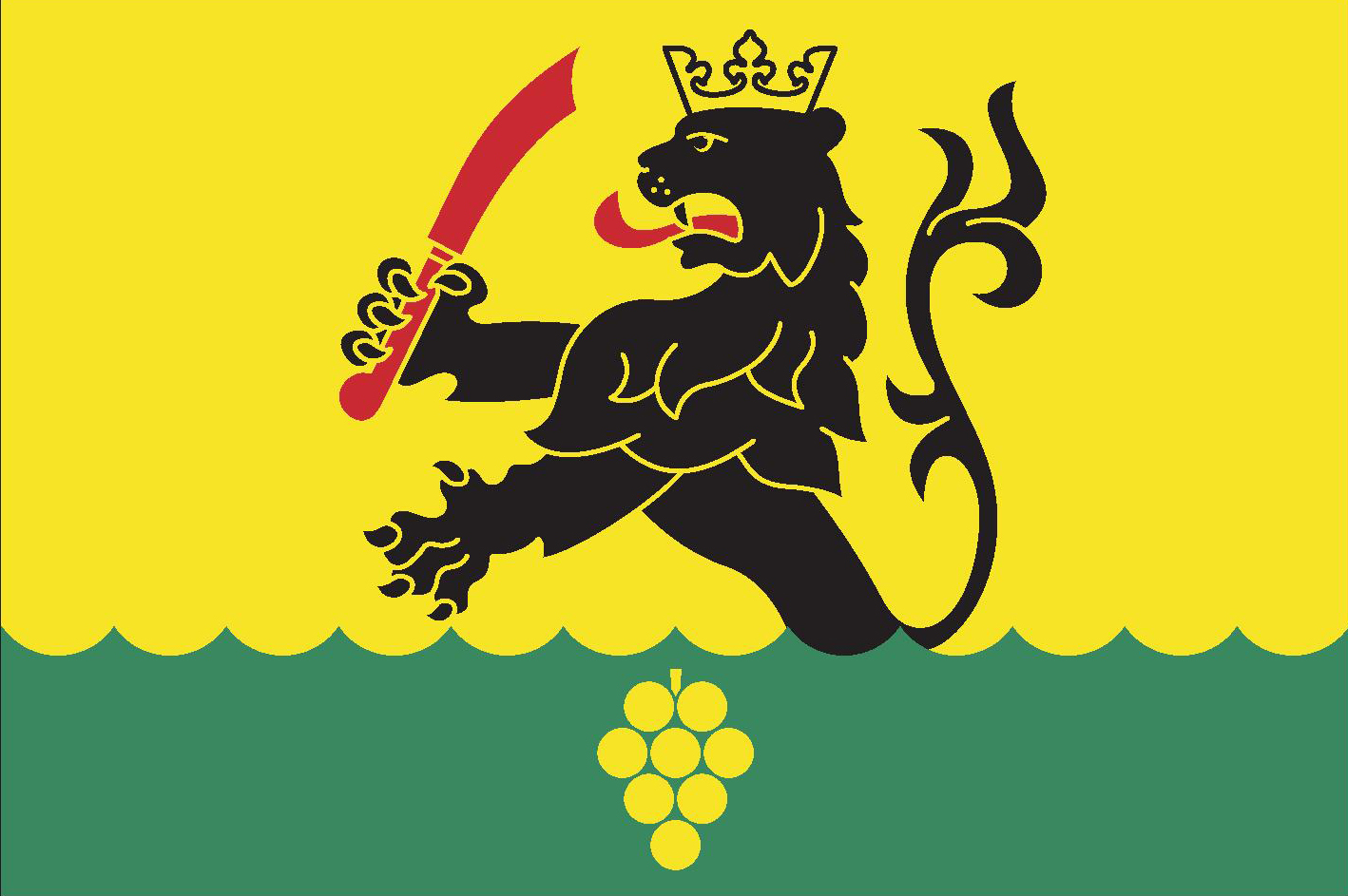
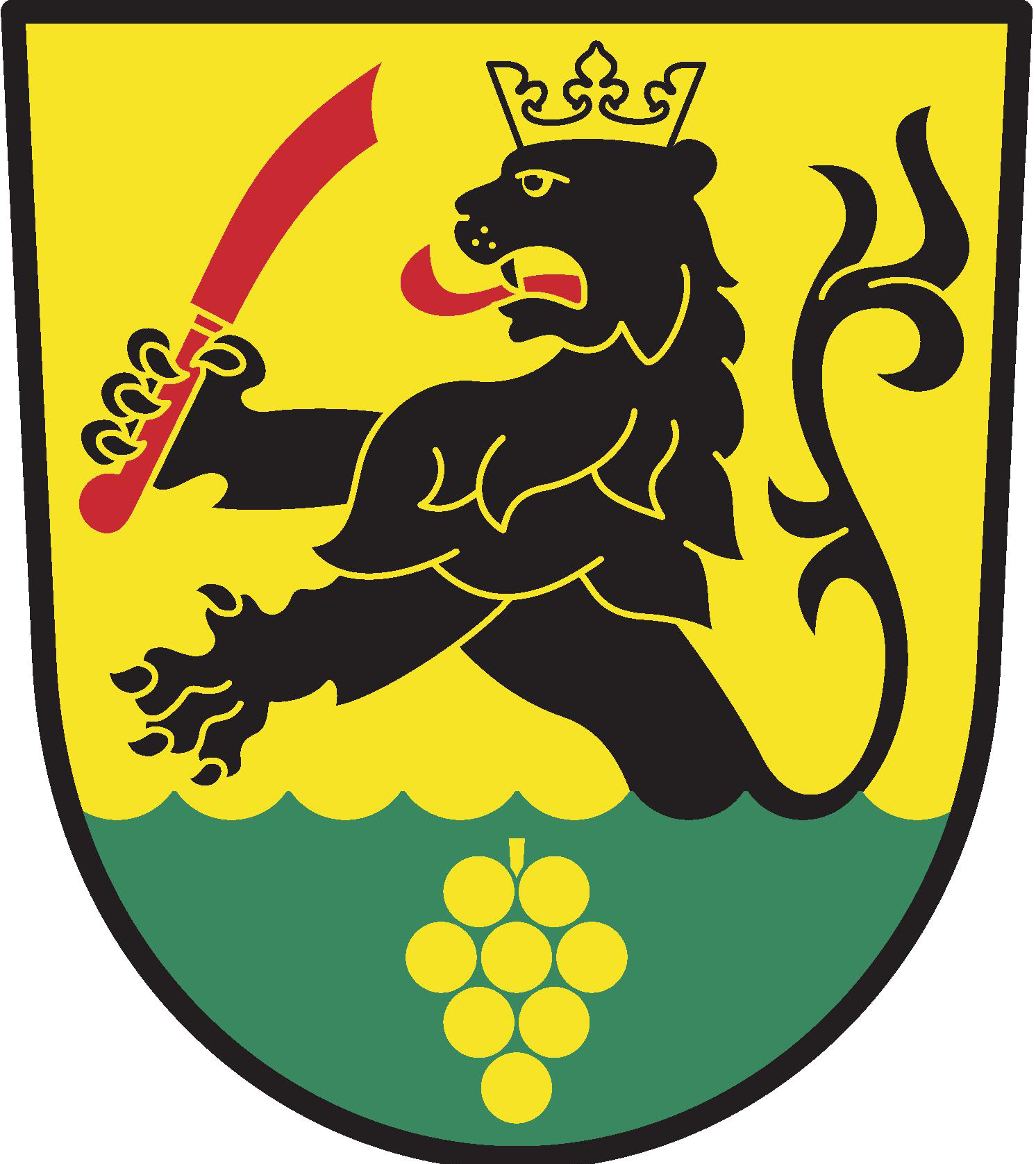
- Flag Coat of arms

- Location in the Czech Republic
- Coordinates: 50°28′2″N 15°19′55″E
- Country: Czech Republic
- Region: Hradec Králové
- District: Jičín
- First mentioned: 1258

Area
  - Total: 1.93 km^{2} (0.75 sq mi)
- Elevation: 400 m (1,300 ft)

Population (2026-01-01)
  - Total: 192
  - Density: 99.5/km^{2} (258/sq mi)
- Time zone: UTC+1 (CET)
  - Summer (DST): UTC+2 (CEST)
- Postal code: 506 01
- Website: www.brada-rybnicek.cz

Brada-Rybníček is a municipality in Jičín District in the Hradec Králové Region of the Czech Republic. It has about 200 inhabitants.

== Administrative division ==
Brada-Rybníček consists of two municipal parts (in brackets population according to the 2021 census):

- Brada (30)
- Rybníček (154)

== Demographics ==
Historical population
Year	Pop.	±%
1869	250	—
1880	268	+7.2%
1890	240	−10.4%
1900	271	+12.9%
1910	259	−4.4%
1921	247	−4.6%
1930	229	−7.3%
1950	161	−29.7%
1961	131	−18.6%
1970	115	−12.2%
1980	72	−37.4%
1991	56	−22.2%
2001	66	+17.9%
2011	128	+93.9%
2021	184	+43.8%
Source: Censuses
