= Fauveliopsidae =

Scientific classification
- Kingdom: Animalia
- Phylum: Annelida
- Clade: Pleistoannelida
- Clade: Sedentaria
- Order: Terebellida
- Family: Fauveliopsidae; Hartman, 1971

Family of polychaeta

Fauveliopsidae is a family of polychaetes belonging to the order Terebellida. The genus name honours Pierre Fauvel.

It is a small family, containing only three genera and about twenty species. They are benthic animals, noted for their habit of sometimes living in the empty shells of dead gastropods, scaphopods, and foraminiferans.

Genera:

- Fauveliopsis McIntosh, 1922
- Laubieriopsis Petersen, 2000
- Riseriopsis Salazar-Vallejo, Zhadan & Rizzo, 2019
