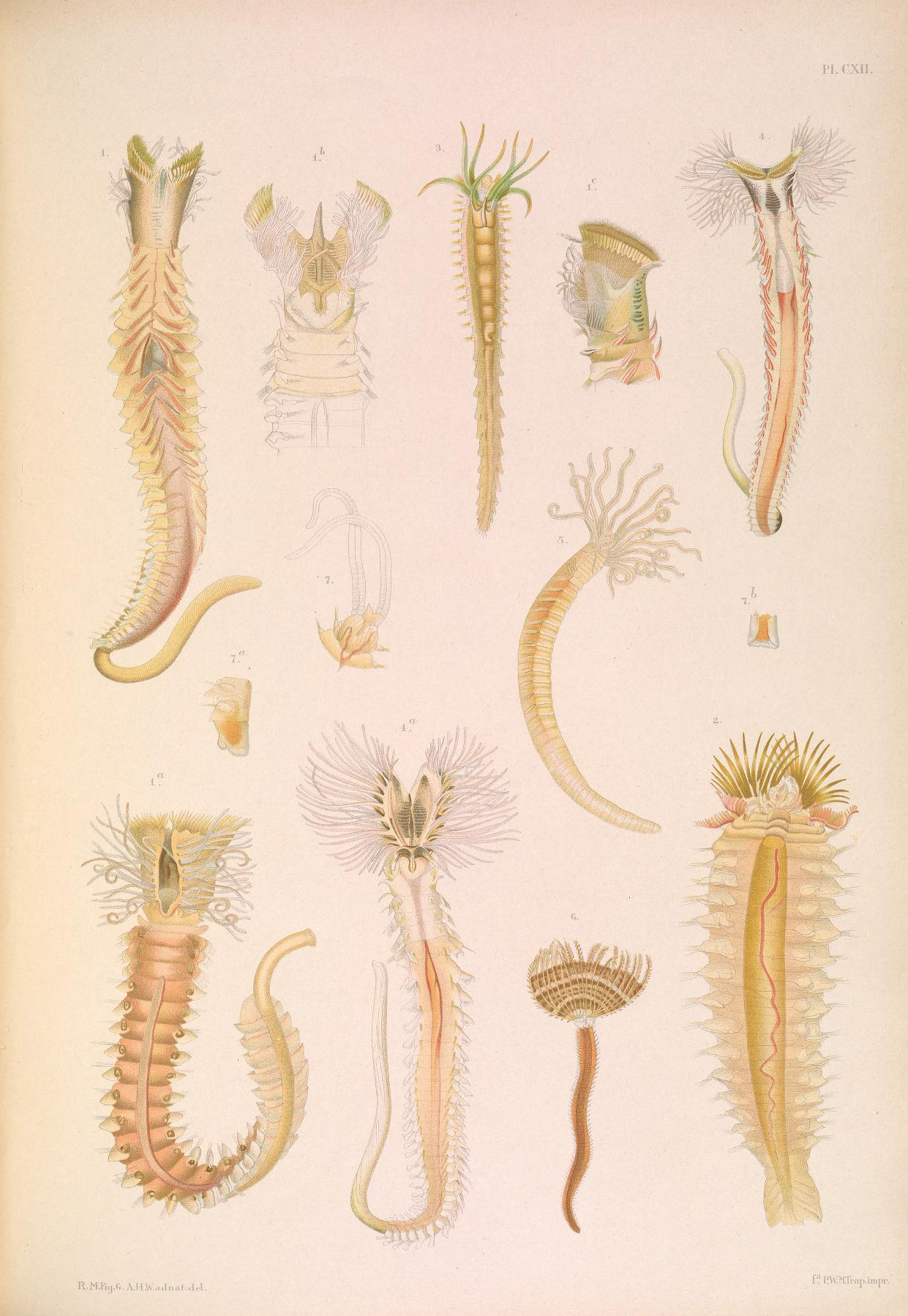
- Ampharete acutifrons (Grube, 1860) figure 3

Scientific classification
- Kingdom: Animalia
- Phylum: Annelida
- Clade: Pleistoannelida
- Clade: Sedentaria
- Order: Terebellida
- Family: Ampharetidae; Malmgren, 1866

Subfamilies and genera
- See text

= Ampharetidae =

Family of annelid worms

Ampharetidae are a family of terebellid "bristle worm" (class Polychaeta). As such, they belong to the order Canalipalpata, one of the three main clades of polychaetes. They appear to be most closely related to the peculiar alvinellids (Alvinellidae) which inhabit the deep sea, and somewhat less closely to the well-known trumpet worms (Pectinariidae). These three appear to form one of the main clades of terebellids.

Almost all are (like polychaetes in general) marine organisms; some inhabit brackish or freshwater though. Most are smallish deposit feeders which frequently live in small tubes they build from mud or similar substrate, or burrow in the sand.

== Subfamilies and genera ==
In 2001, Rouse and Pleijel divided the Ampharetidae into three subfamilies: the large Ampharetinae, the much smaller Melinninae, and the monotypic Uschakovinae. Also, there are some ampharetid genera incertae sedis or in a quite basal position:

- Aryandes
- Pavelius
- Rytocephalus

As of late 2021, the World Register of Marine Species recognizes the following subdivisions:

- Amaginae Holthe, 1986
- Ampharetinae Malmgren, 1866
- Amphicteinae Holthe, 1986
- Rytocephalus Quatrefages, 1866
- Uschakovius Laubier, 1973
