= Opheliida =

Scientific classification
- Domain: Eukaryota
- Kingdom: Animalia
- Phylum: Annelida
- Class: Polychaeta
- Order: Opheliida

Order of annelids

Opheliida is an order of polychaetes belonging to the class Polychaeta.

Families:

- Opheliidae Malmgren, 1867
- Scalibregmatidae Malmgren, 1867
