= Anders Johan Malmgren =

Finnish government official and zoologist

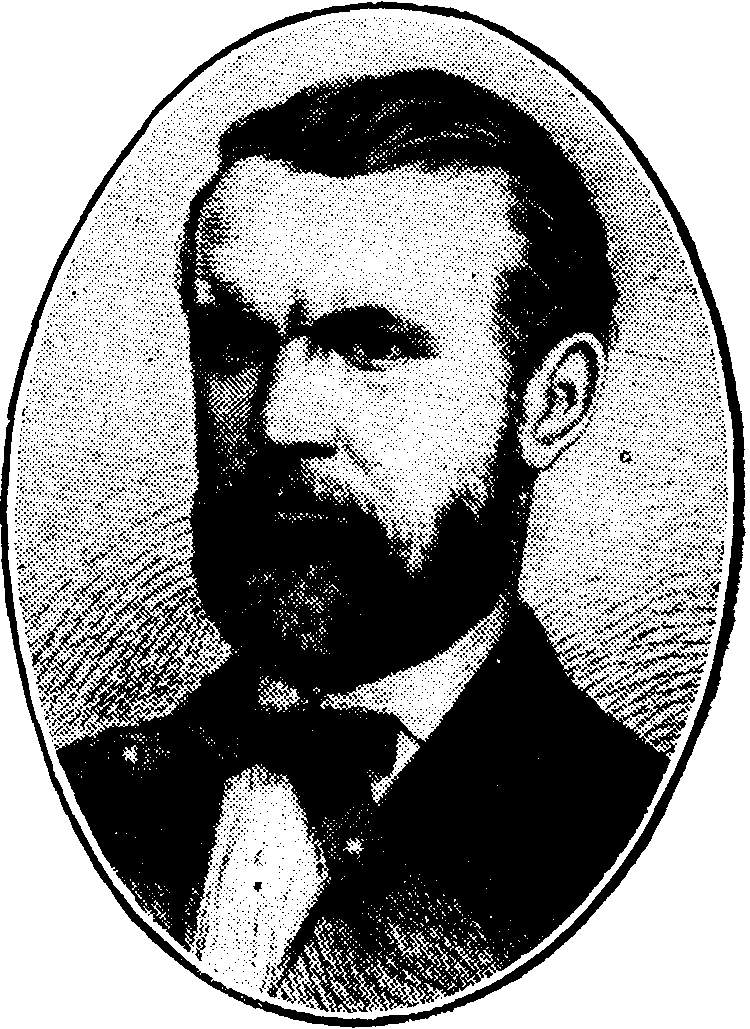
- Anders Johan Malmgren
- Born: 21 November 1834; Kajaani
- Died: 14 April 1897 (aged 62); Helsinki
- Occupations: Zoologist and government official

Anders Johan Malmgren (21 November 1834 – 14 April 1897) was a Finnish zoologist and government official.

Malmgren was a student in Helsinki in 1854, Master primus 1860, PhD 1864, Acting Commissioner of the fisheries in 1865, extraordinary professor of zoology at the University of Helsinki in 1869, Fishery Commissioner in 1877 and governor of the Oulu province in 1889.

Malmgren undertook several scientific expeditions, especially in the northern latitudes, to the White Sea (1856) and to Spitsbergen and Finnmark as a participant in the first three Swedish expeditions (1861, 1864 and 1868). The plant material collected by him was distributed in the exsiccata-like specimen series Plantae in Itineribus Suecorum Polaribus collectae [1868]. His most important scientific work involving the boreal region's fauna and flora; These include Kritisk öfversigt af Finlands fiskfauna (1863), Anteckningar om Spetsbergens fågelfauna (1863–64), Iakttagelser och anteckningar till Finnmarkens och Spetsbergens däggdjursfauna (1865) and Bidrag till Finnmarkens fiskfauna (1867). His most important works - the fruit of his Nordic research trips - is his work on polychaete worms in Nordiska hafsannulaterna (1865) and Om Spetsbergens, Grönlands, Islands och Skandinaviska halföns hittills kända Annulata polychaeta (1867).

As fishery commissioner Malmgren undertook many significant operations. The years 1869-70 he published "Handlingar och förordningar angående Finlands fiskerier" ("Collection of Documents and regulations concerning Finnish fisheries") as five booklets, and later, a sixth, and in 1869 he began to publish "Tidskrift för fiskerinäring och agrikultur" ("Journal of the fishing industry and agriculture"), but soon ceased due to lack of interest. Moreover, he worked eagerly for the enhancement of fisheries and fish, especially for Salmonidae, protection and stocking of valuable fish types in Finnish waters and for basic fishery associations. He was hired by the government often for special committees (including the school committee in 1879).

At the time of his death in 1897, Malmgren was one of the twenty foreign members of the British Ornithologists' Union.
