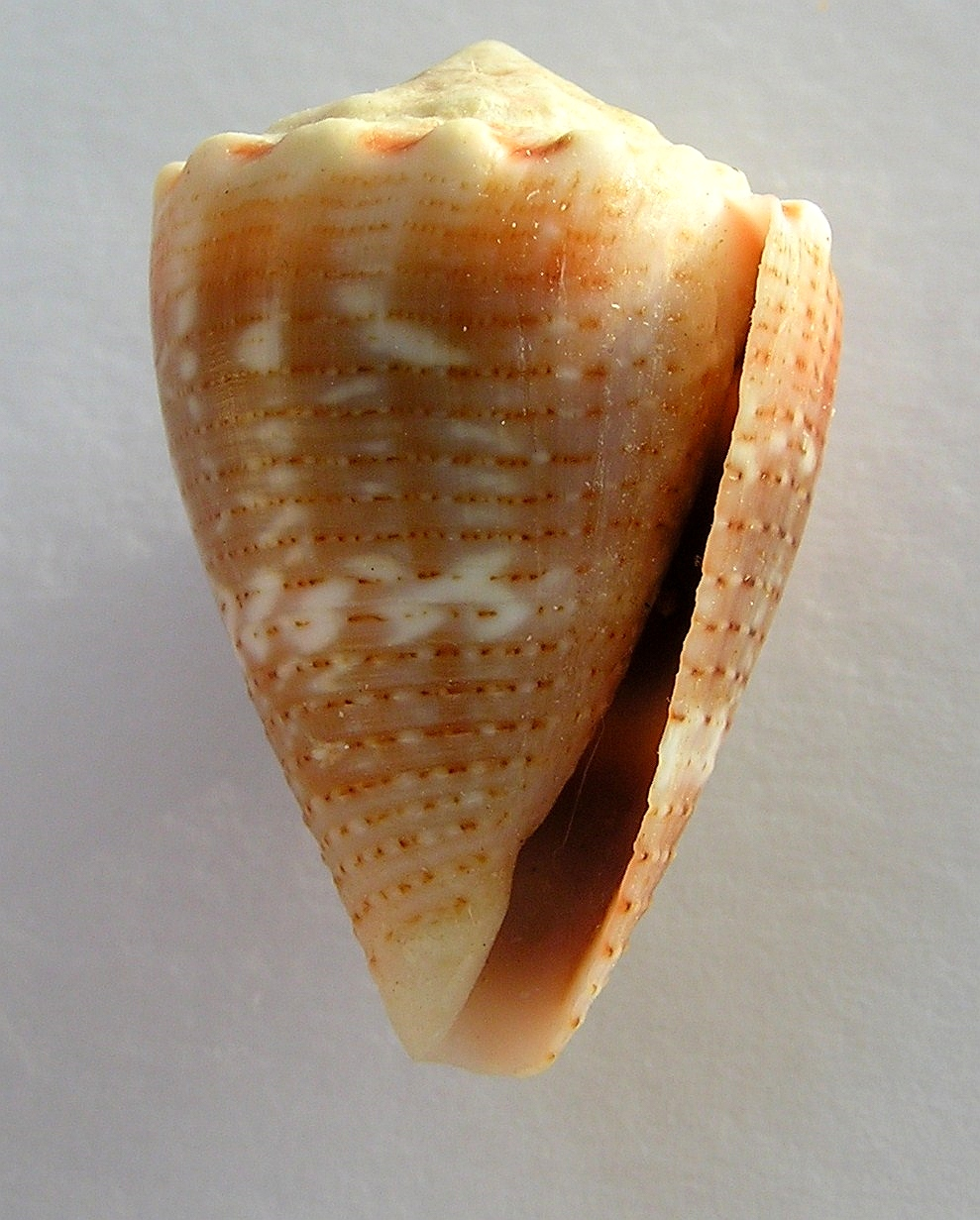
- Apertural view of a shell of Conus miliaris miliaris

Conservation status
- Least Concern (IUCN 3.1)

Scientific classification
- Kingdom: Animalia
- Phylum: Mollusca
- Class: Gastropoda
- Subclass: Caenogastropoda
- Order: Neogastropoda
- Superfamily: Conoidea
- Family: Conidae
- Genus: Conus
- Species: C. miliaris

Binomial name
- Conus miliaris Hwass in Bruguière, 1792

Synonyms
- Conus (Virroconus) miliaris Hwass in Bruguière, 1792 · accepted, alternate representation; Conus barbadensis Hwass in Bruguière, 1792; Conus fulgetrum G. B. Sowerby II, 1834; Conus miliaris var. minor Couturier, 1907 (invalid: junior homonym of Conus mediterraneus var. minor Monterosato, 1878); Conus minimus var. granulatus G. B. Sowerby I, 1834; Conus scaber Kiener, 1845; Miliariconus miliaris Hwass, C.H. in Bruguière, J.G., 1792

= Conus miliaris =

Species of sea snail

Conus miliaris, common name the thousand-spot cone, is a species of sea snails, marine gastropod molluscs in the family Conidae, the cone snails and their allies.

Like all species within the genus Conus, these snails are predatory and venomous. They are capable of stinging humans, therefore live ones should be handled carefully or not at all.

Subspecies

- Conus miliaris miliaris Hwass in Bruguière, 1792
- Conus miliaris pascuensis Rehder, H.A., 1980

== Description ==
The size of an adult shell varies between 12 mm and 43 mm. The spire is more or less raised, striate or sometimes nearly smooth, with or without tubercles The body whorl is striate, the stride usually grannlous towards the base, and sometimes throughout. The color of the shell is yellowish or light chestnut or grayish, variously clouded with darker chestnut or olive, often irregularly light-banded at the middle, and below the spire, and encircled with chestnut spots on the striae. The interior is chocolate, with a central white band. There is considerable variation in the height and coronation of the spire, as well as in the color and pattern of the markings.

== Distribution ==
Conus miliaris is a species of wide distribution, and apparently everywhere common. It occurs in tropical to subtropical shallow water environments from the Red Sea and eastern shores of Africa in the western Indian Ocean (Aldabra, Chagos, Kenya, Madagascar, the Mascarene Basin, Mauritius, Mozambique and Tanzania) to Easter Island and Sala y Gómez in the southeastern Pacific (but not off the Galapagos Islands, the Marquesas Islands and Hawaii).; off Australia (New South Wales, Northern Territory, Queensland, Western Australia).

== Feeding habits ==
These snails are predatory and venomous. They are capable of stinging humans, therefore live ones should be handled carefully or not at all.

Presumably in response to the relative absence of congeners at Easter Island, Conus miliaris has undergone ecological release: it preys on a more diverse assemblage of prey at Easter Island and is more abundant at Easter Island than at other localities in its range. Conus miliaris from most areas in the Indo-West Pacific, where it co-occurs with as many as 36 congeners, preys almost exclusively on three species of eunicid polychaetes (Eunicidae).

But at Easter Island its diet is considerably broader and includes additional species of eunicids as well as several species of nereids, an onuphid and members of seven other polychaete families. Its prey on Easter Island include: Eunicidae includes Lysidice collaris, Nematonereis unicornis, Eunice afra, Eunice cariboea and Palola siciliensis; Nereididae includes Perinereis singaporensis; Onuphidae includes Onuphis sp.

== Gallery ==
Below are several color forms and one subspecies:

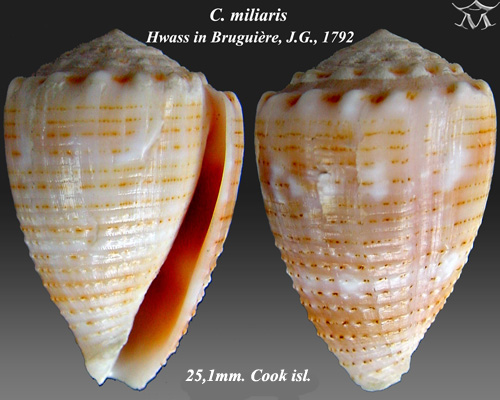
Conus miliaris Hwass in Bruguière, J.G., 1792

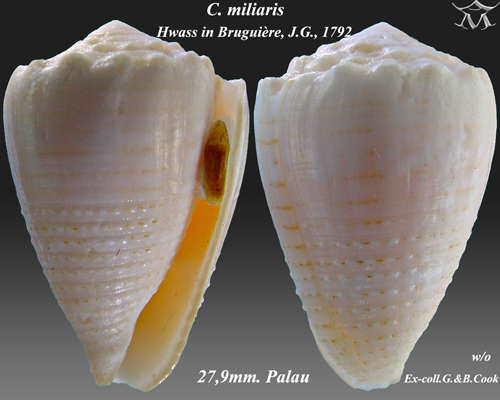
Conus miliaris Hwass in Bruguière, J.G., 1792

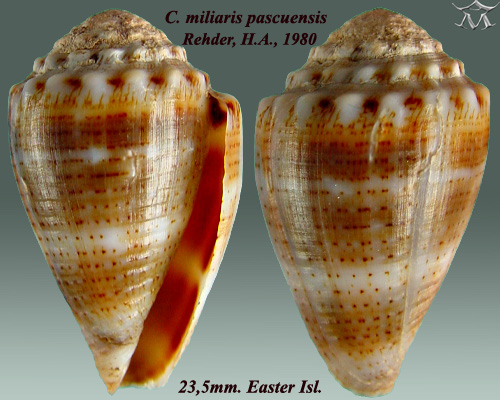
Conus miliaris Hwass in Bruguière, J.G., 1792

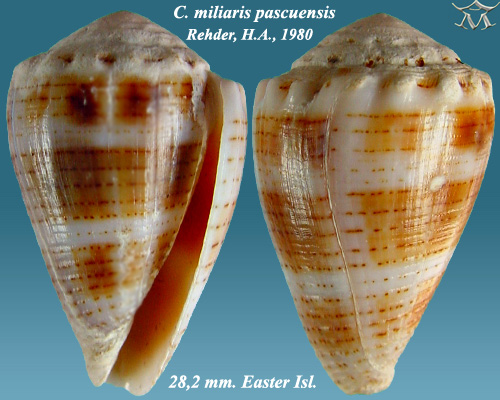
Conus miliaris Hwass in Bruguière, J.G., 1792

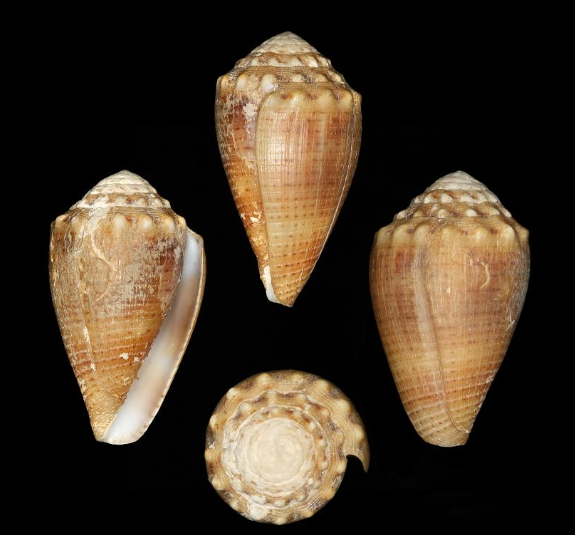
holotype of Conus miliaris pascuensis Rehder, 1980 (holotype at the Smithsonian Institution)
