= Onuphis =

Onuphis may refer to:

- Onuphis or Onouphis, archeological site in Roman Egypt
- Onuphis (annelid), a genus of polychaetes in the family Onuphidae
