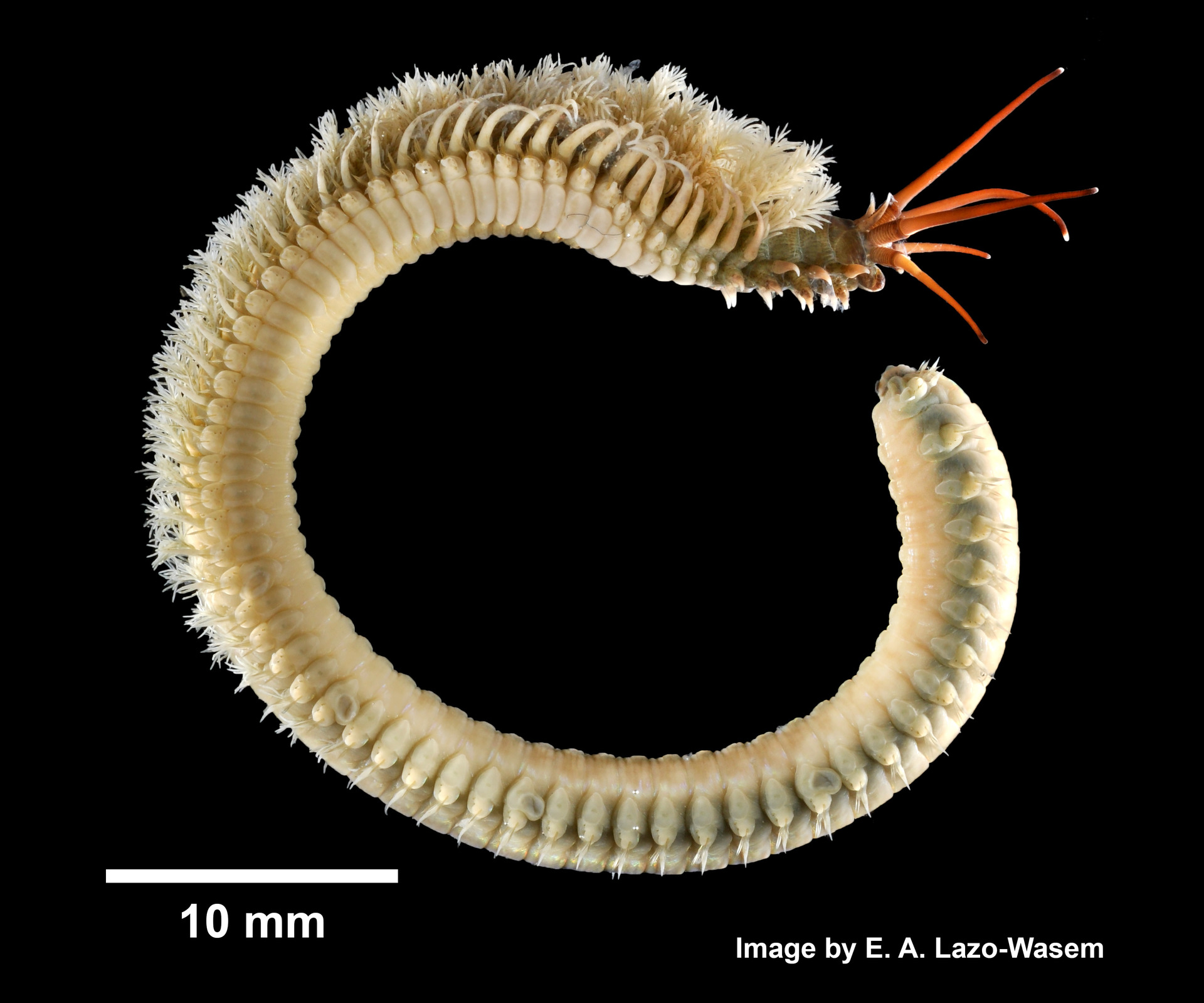
- Preserved specimen

Scientific classification
- Kingdom: Animalia
- Phylum: Annelida
- Clade: Pleistoannelida
- Subclass: Errantia
- Order: Eunicida
- Family: Onuphidae
- Genus: Diopatra
- Species: D. cuprea

Binomial name
- Diopatra cuprea (Bosc, 1802)

Synonyms
- Diopatra brasiliensis Hansen, 1882; Diopatra fragilis Ehlers, 1869; Diopatra frontalis Grube, 1850; Diopatra spiribranchis Augener, 1906; Diopatra variegata Hansen, 1882; Nereis cuprea Bosc, 1802

= Diopatra cuprea =

Species of annelid worm

Diopatra cuprea, commonly known as the plumed worm, decorator worm or sometimes ornate worm, is a species of polychaete worm in the family Onuphidae, first described by the French entomologist Louis Augustin Guillaume Bosc in 1802. It is native to the northwestern Atlantic Ocean, the Caribbean Sea and the Gulf of Mexico.

== Description ==
Diopatra cuprea inhabits a parchment-like tube made of a mucous polysaccharide material, the tip of which projects from the sediment in which the rest of the tube is buried. The tube acts as a chimney; the lower part may be a metre long and is smooth with grains of sediment adhering to it. The upper part resembles an inverted "J", with the outer surface being reinforced with shell fragments and tiny pebbles which are cemented in the style of an overlapping mosaic. This part is extended by the worm if siltation threatens to bury it, and the tube occasionally has two entrances.

When these tubes are no longer occupied, they get washed out of the seabed and sometimes get deposited on the strand-line. The living worm is very colourful; its reddish-brown segmented body is iridescent, and often dotted with grey. Each segment bears a pair of yellowish-brown, oar-like parapodia with green speckles, which contrast with the bright red gills or "plumes" which endow the worm with its more common name, resembling a Christmas tree in rare cases. The occipital tentacles are covered with neat longitudinal rows of papillae of different sizes.

== Distribution ==
Diopatra cuprea occurs in the warm waters of the western Atlantic Ocean. Its range extends from Cape Cod southwards to the West Indies, the Caribbean Sea, the Gulf of Mexico, Trinidad and Tobago, Venezuela and Brazil.

== Ecology ==
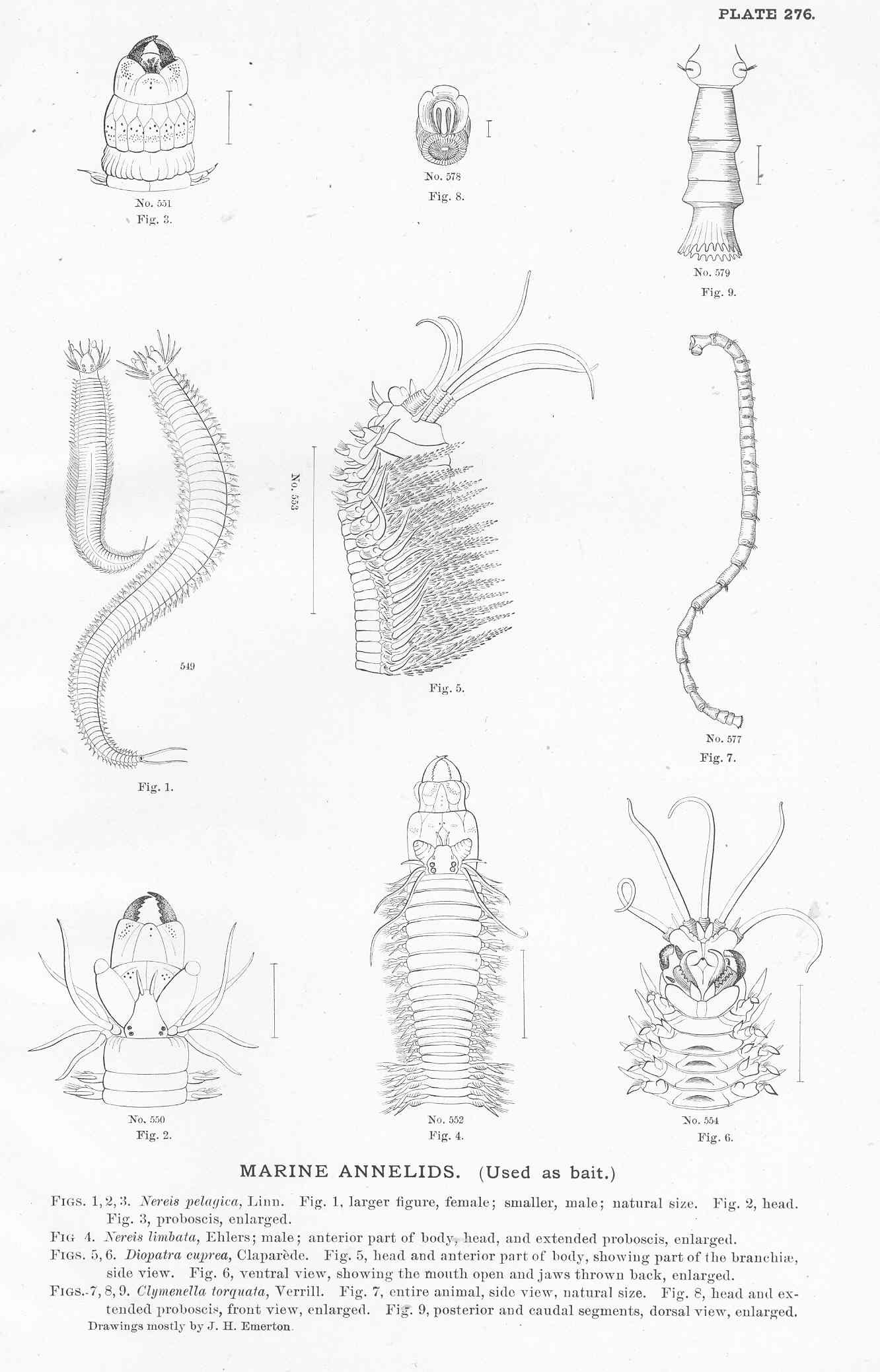
Fig.5,6 Diopatra cuprea, illustrated by James Henry Emerton

Diopatra cuprea is an omnivore and scavenger; it feeds on algae as well as on small invertebrates such as copepods, gastropod molluscs, barnacle larvae and hooded shrimps, some of which tend to grow on the exterior of the tube. The worm can turn round inside the tube, and this seems to serve as a food-gathering device as well as a home. The shell also serves as a tool to provide facilitation by gathering algae on its shell and introducing it to areas where algae populations are unstable. The worm actively creates a flow of water through the tube to increase oxygenation, and haemoglobins in the interstitial fluid are used as respiratory pigments.

It can often be found in sea grass meadows of turtlegrass Thalassia testudinum and shoalweed Halodule wrightii, along with the polychaete worms Owenia fusiformis and Polydora ligni, and the phoronid worm Phoronis psammophila. Other animals living in this habitat include the brittle stars Ophiothrix angulata and Ophiactis savignyi, the dove snail Costoanachis semiplicata, the bivalves Phacoides pectinatus and Chione cancellata, the bay scallop Argopecten irradians and the predatory snail Neverita duplicata.
