= Diopatra claparedii =

Scientific classification
- Domain: Eukaryota
- Kingdom: Animalia
- Phylum: Annelida
- Clade: Pleistoannelida
- Subclass: Errantia
- Order: Eunicida
- Family: Onuphidae
- Genus: Diopatra
- Species: D. claparedii

Binomial name
- Diopatra claparedii Grube, 1878

Species of polychaete worm

Diopatra claparedii is a species of tube-building polychaete worm of the family Onuphidae. It is found dispersed along intertidal and subtidal benthic environments of South Asian waters, especially along the coasts of Malaysia, Singapore, Thailand, and the Philippines. This species is exploited by humans for fishing bait, indication of marine pollution, and as gold and silver nanoparticle biosynthesis agents.

== Ecology ==
Diopatra claparedii are tubicolous, meaning they reside in a tube for much of their life cycle. The tube is formed from sediment, rock, organic matter, and a mucus that the worm excretes, and can range from 30-60 cm in length, found in burrowed into sediments of littoral environments of South Asian coastal waters, with varying lengths visible above ground. Though other species of Diopatra adorn their tubes with shells or protruding rocks, D. claparedii primarily utilizes mangrove leaves, larger pieces of which can be seen at the end protruding into the water column, and are sometimes used to 'cap' the tube.

Trochophore larvae of D. claparedii are pelagic and swim using cilia for just a few days before the larva begins to develop the characteristic chaetigers of adult polychaetes and begins building the tube. The adult worm does not leave the tube for the rest of its life cycle, except for brief extensions of the anterior end for feeding on nearby sediments and organisms, and exuding reproductive products. This makes the worm an important ecosystem engineer, along with the rest of the genus Diopatra, because the tubes penetrate the sediment, help stabilize it and prevent erosion, and create spaces between neighboring tube protrusions as well as cavities within the tubes themselves that allow small organisms to shelter or evade predation.

Diopatra claparedii are omnivorous, and primarily feed on algal growths on or near the tube, nearby polychaetes, as well as various planktonic invertebrates. The tubes they reside in are thought to help with predator evasion, as movement near the worms causes them to retract rapidly into the tube. Additionally, the worms use hydrostatically pressurized parapodia and setae to pierce the sides of the tube, providing traction that limits extraction from the tube. Some setae along the body of the worm are specialized, and feature hooks that allow better attachment to the tube.

=== Reproduction ===
Diopatra reproduce by broadcast spawning and subsequently, by random fertilization. Many adults of this genus are protandrous sequential hermaphrodites, likely due to the fitness benefits of first existing in a larger male form for competitive advantages in occupying space and prey capture. Though previously assumed to be gonochoristic, since eggs or sperm (but not both) can be found on the body wall of sexually mature adults, there are now observations of at least 3 species' life cycles in Diopatra known to be protandrous sequential hermaphrodites, indicating it is likely more widespread within the genus, especially since previous accounts suggesting gonochorism do not observe the entire life cycle of the worm. Broadcast spawning is also a discrete, annual event, in which case adults exude gametes into the water column above the sediment bed where the tubeworms reside, though the neurobiological mechanism by which the animal recognizes the timing for spawning is not well understood.

=== Development ===
There have not been specific analyses of D. claparedii development, but studies of Diopatra more generally indicate that other members of the genus exhibit spiral cleavage, and develop indirectly from fertilized eggs to a ciliate trochophore larval form that is briefly pelagic, or, in some cases, occupies the tube formed by the parent. Uniquely, the development from zygote to ciliated larva only takes three hours in some cases, making it a very rapid process. From there, the trochophore metamorphoses into a metatrochophore, which exhibits chaetigers and parapodia as the adult does, though far fewer, and begins building the tube structure where it will develop into an adult with more numerous segments.

=== Physiology ===
Diopatra claparedii is a dark, reddish brown polychaete, with many lateral parapodia, as well as specialized sensory appendages such as tentacular cirri and antenna on the anterior end of the worm. In Diopatra, the anterior end of the worms are cylindrical, while the posterior end exhibits dorsoventral flattening. The main body consists of repeating segments called chaetigers, each with a pair of parapodia containing setae, the function of which varies depending on where on the body the chaetiger is located. The body of D. claparedii may have between 35 and 150 chaetigers, and those near the posterior and anterior ends have hook-like setae to assist with attachment to the tube. Setae in the middle of the worm tend to be serrate, rather than hooked, and have a number of different potential structural patterns, including bidentate, pseudocompound bidentate, and fulcate. The anterior end of the worm houses several key structures: palps, antennae, a prostomium with a mouth, peristomial cirri, and the characteristic spiraled branchiae that set the genus Diopatra apart from other sedentary polychaetes.

Additionally, the nervous system of D. claparedii is of special research interest, because it is able to undergo both anterior and posterior regeneration. Regeneration is a common feature among annelids and, within them, polychaetes, but the ability to regrow from both ends of the body is not as widespread. This ability also helps them to survive predation, as when part of the body is pulled from the tube, the remaining segments may regrow the anterior end of the worm, though this process is subject to the degree of body fragmentation.

=== Evolution ===
Diopatra claparedii belongs to the Phylum Annelida, Class Polychaeta, Order Eunicida, in the Family Onuphidae. Uniquely, the genus Diopatra is defined by a single characteristic that has not changed since the creation of the taxonomic group– the spirally-arranged branchial filaments around the trunk of the worm. However, within Diopatra, there are not clear, distinctive features between species, and as such, identification has remained difficult and sometimes erroneous in literature across geographic regions.

== Impacts on humans and technology ==
Interestingly, D. claparedii has potential for use in the sphere of nanotechnology. Synthesis of silver and gold nanoparticles (AgNPs, AuNPs) often requires harsh and ecologically toxic reagents and chemicals. New directions aim to identify greener ways of synthesizing these important nanoparticles, including use of polychaete tissues as a reduction agent. Either physical or chemical reduction is used to create the silver or gold nanoparticles, and it has been found that frozen, pulverized D. claparedii tissue has reduction action that can successfully aid in the creation of the nanoparticles.
