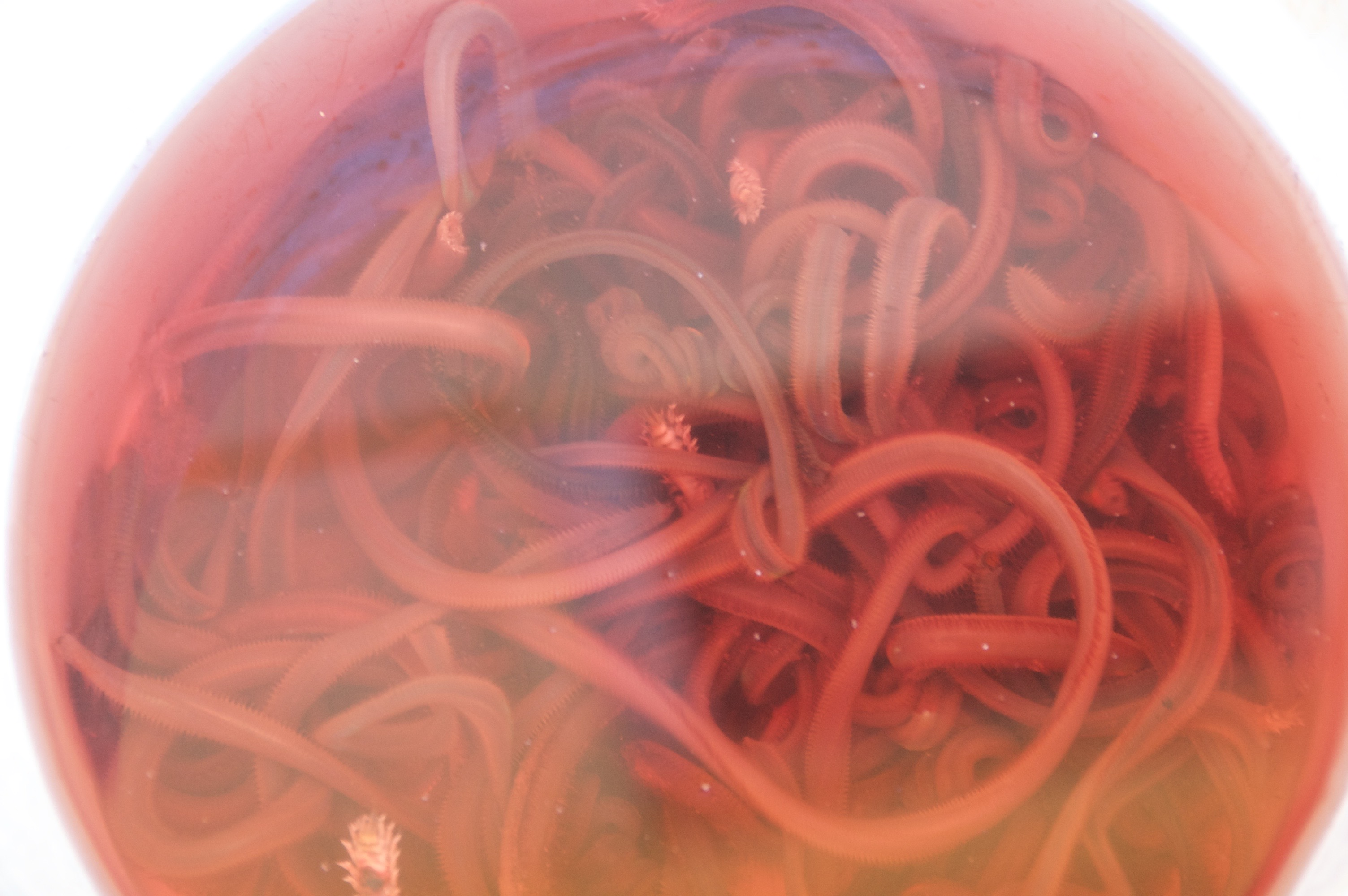
- Australian beach worms in a bucket

Scientific classification
- Kingdom: Animalia
- Phylum: Annelida
- Clade: Pleistoannelida
- Subclass: Errantia
- Order: Eunicida
- Family: Onuphidae
- Genus: Australonuphis

Species
- A. casamiquelorum; A. hartmanae; A. mariahirsuta; A. parateres; A. teres

= Australonuphis =

Genus of annelids

Australonuphis, commonly called Australian beach worms, are a genus of polychaetous annelids of the family Onuphidae that inhabit the intertidal zone of coastal beaches and are attracted to the surface by the stimulus of food. They are sought by anglers to be used as bait for fishing. Some species can grow more than two metres in length. They are blind but have a very good sense of smell, and eat decaying meat, fish and seaweeds that have washed to shore.

Originally identified as a single species in 1868 (Diopatra teres), in 1878 they were placed in the genus Onuphis. A study in 1979 renamed two Americonuphis species as Australonuphis (A. teres and A. parateres), both being found in New South Wales. A novel species from the Ecuadorian coast was identified in 2008.

Australian beach worms occur in millions on many surf beaches from Queensland, New South Wales and South Australia. They are highly valued as bait by anglers because of their great length and muscular body. The worms can be collected from the sandy beach by attracting them to the surface with bait and subsequently extracting them from the sand by hand or with the aid of pliers.

== Species ==
The genus includes four species which can be considered as two pairs of species: the Central and South American pair is A. hartmanae and A. casamiquelorum; and the Australian pair is A. teres and A. parateres. (Onuphis mariahirsuta has been referred to as A. mariahirsuta but this classification is not clear.)

=== A. teres and A. parateres ===
A. teres and A. parateres were identified in 1868 by Ehlers as Diopatra teres and in 1878 they were placed in the genus Onuphis by Grube. In 1979, Paxton re-classified them into their current taxonomy, in what is regarded as the authority study on Australian beach worms. During her study, Paxton identified three worms known by local collectors as 'slimy', 'stumpy' and 'kingworm': slimy was at that time a separate species (Americonuphis) which Paxton replaced with Australonuphis. Stumpies were found to be young kingworms. The holotype of A. teres is a kingworm and the closely related slimy was described as A.parateres, sp. nov.

=== A. hartmanae and A. casamiquelorum ===
A. hartmanae was identified as Rhamphobrachium hartmanae in 1956 by Friedrich, and then reclassified in 1974 along with A. casamiquelorum by Orensanz.

== Use as bait for fishing ==
Beach worms (especially 'kingworms' A. teres) are targeted by anglers for use as bait to catch fish. To catch beach worms, anglers generally wait for low tide when the intertidal zone is exposed, and lure worms up out of the sand to the surface by washing a bait (often of old fish frames or pilchards in a stocking) in the water as waves recede. The worm smells the fish and raises its head up out of the sand as much as 25 millimetres (0.98 in), allowing the angler to see the worm, catch it, and pull it out of the sand by hand or with pliers. The caught worms are then used immediately as bait for fishing, or stored in a bucket of fresh sea water or a handful of damp sand for later use. If undamaged during the catching process, and stored well, worms may survive for longer than a day. Worms can also be preserved by immersion in alcohol (commonly methylated spirits) for 5 seconds and then left to dry on newspaper and either stored in an insulated cooler or refrigerator or frozen.

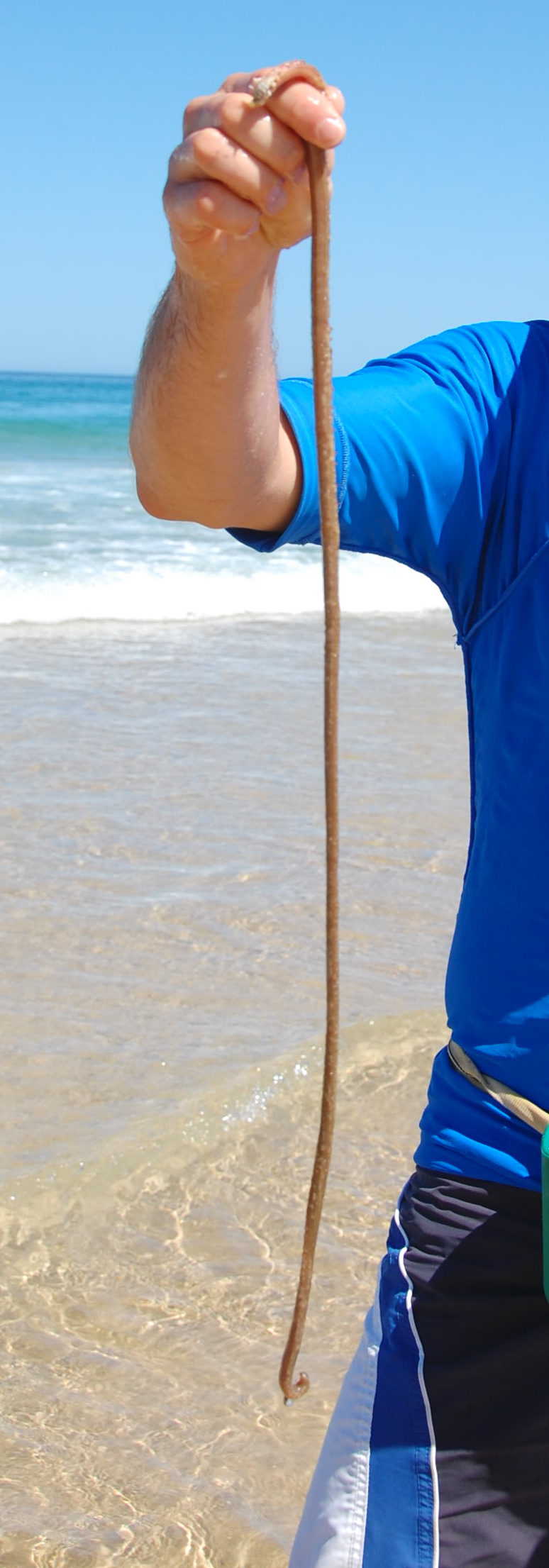
A caught worm

Catching beach worms, NSW Australia
