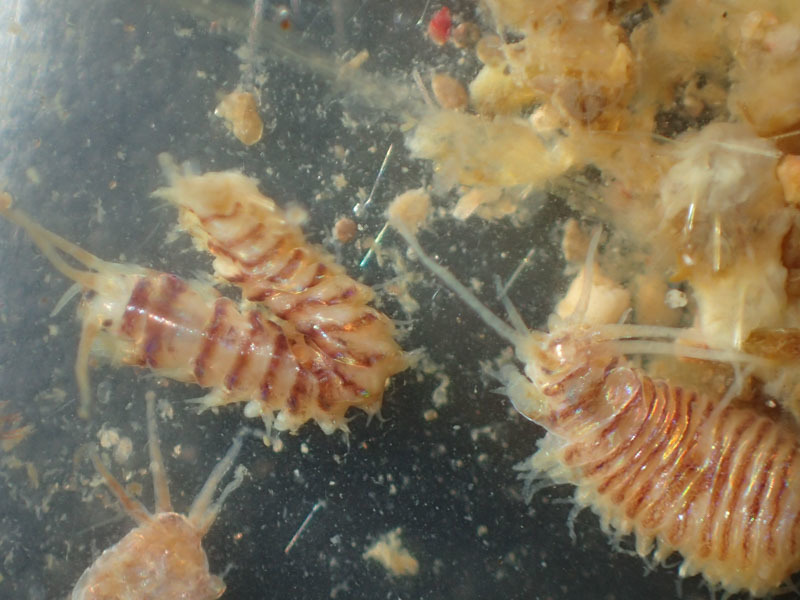
- Nothria conchylega

Scientific classification
- Kingdom: Animalia
- Phylum: Annelida
- Clade: Pleistoannelida
- Subclass: Errantia
- Order: Eunicida
- Family: Onuphidae
- Genus: Nothria; Malmgren, 1867

= Nothria =

Genus of annelid worms

Nothria is a genus of polychaetes belonging to the family Onuphidae.

The genus has cosmopolitan distribution.

Species:

- Nothria abyssia Kucheruk, 1978
- Nothria africana (Augener, 1918)
- Nothria anoculata Orensanz, 1974
- Nothria atlantica (Hartman, 1965)
- Nothria benthophyla Lana, 1991
- Nothria britannica (McIntosh, 1903)
- Nothria conchylega (Sars, 1835)
- Nothria delta Paxton, Budaeva & Gunton, 2023
- Nothria deltasigma Paxton, Budaeva & Gunton, 2023
- Nothria digitata Paxton, Budaeva & Gunton, 2023
- Nothria edwardsi (Roule, 1898)
- Nothria grossa Imajima, 1989
- Nothria hawaiiensis Pettibone, 1970
- Nothria hyperborea (Hansen, 1878)
- Nothria itoi Maekawa & Hayashi, 1989
- Nothria josae Paxton, Budaeva & Gunton, 2023
- Nothria lizae Paxton, Budaeva & Gunton, 2023
- Nothria mannarensis Rangarajan & Mahadevan, 1961
- Nothria maremontana André & Pleijel, 1989
- Nothria minima Paxton, Budaeva & Gunton, 2023
- Nothria nikitai Budaeva, 2015
- Nothria oblonga Imajima, 1999
- Nothria occidentalis Fauchald, 1968
- Nothria orensanzi Paxton, Budaeva & Gunton, 2023
- Nothria otsuchiensis Imajima, 1986
- Nothria paxtonae Imajima, 1999
- Nothria simplex Paxton, Budaeva & Gunton, 2023
- Nothria solenotecton (Chamberlin, 1919)
- Nothria textor Hartman & Fauchald, 1971
