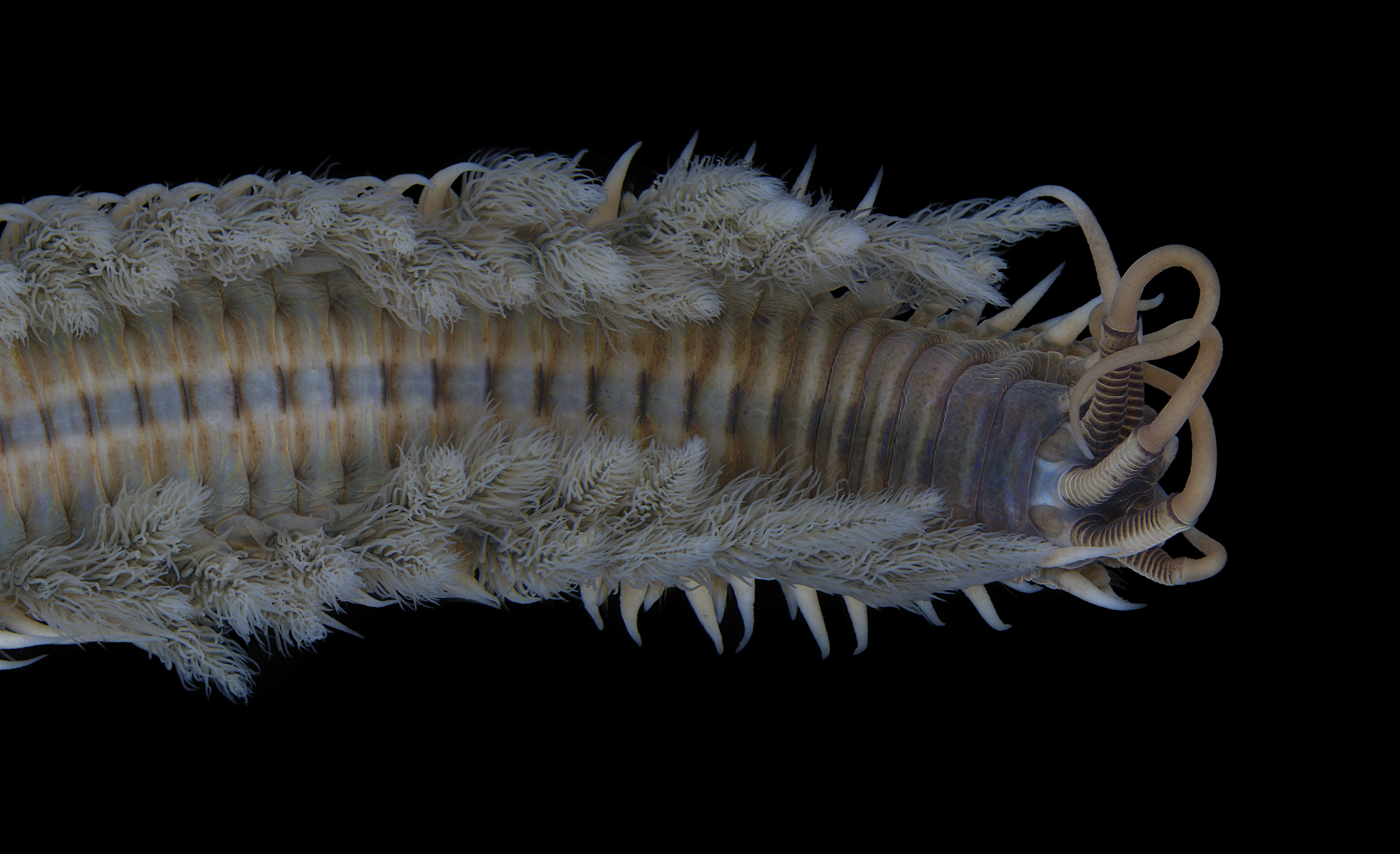
- Diopatra neapolitana

Scientific classification
- Kingdom: Animalia
- Phylum: Annelida
- Clade: Pleistoannelida
- Subclass: Errantia
- Order: Eunicida
- Family: Onuphidae
- Genus: Diopatra; Audouin & Milne Edwards, 1833

Species
- See text

= Diopatra =

Genus of annelid worms

Diopatra is a genus of polychaete worms in the family Onuphidae.

== Description ==
Members of this genus live in thick, parchment-like tubes that project from the sediment on the seabed. The tubes are covered on the outside by fragments of shell, algae, fibers and other small objects, collected by the worm and stuck in place by mucus. The worm's tube is a food-catching tool that creates a small micro-reef where small invertebrate prey reside. Diopatra dart partially out of the tube and grasp the prey with their maxillae and mandibles. Their large anterior parapodia help them to immobilize the prey.

== Species ==
The World Register of Marine Species includes these species in the genus. A 2021 study also identified 4 new species in the south-west Atlantic.

- Diopatra aciculata Knox & Cameron, 1971
- Diopatra agave Grube, 1869
- Diopatra akarana Knox & Hicks, 1973
- Diopatra albimandibulata Paxton, 1993
- Diopatra amboinensis Audouin & Milne Edwards, 1833
- Diopatra amoena Kinberg, 1865
- Diopatra angolensis Kirkegaard, 1988
- Diopatra bengalensis Hartman, 1974
- Diopatra bilobata Imajima, 1967
- Diopatra brasiliensis Kinberg, 1910
- Diopatra brevicirris Grube, 1856
- Diopatra bulohensis Tan & Chou, 1996
- Diopatra chiliensis Quatrefages, 1866
- Diopatra chiliensis Quatrefages, 1865
- Diopatra claparedii Grube, 1878
- Diopatra cuprea (Bosc, 1802)
- Diopatra dentata Kinberg, 1865
- Diopatra denticulata Fauchald, 1968
- Diopatra dexiognatha Paxton & Bailey-Brock, 1986
- Diopatra dubia Day, 1960
- Diopatra farallonensis Fauchald, 1968
- Diopatra gesae Paxton, 1998
- Diopatra gigova Paxton, 1993
- Diopatra hanleyi Paxton, 1993
- Diopatra hannelorae Steiner & Amaral sp. nov.
- Diopatra heterodentata Hartmann-Schröder, 1965
- Diopatra italica Castelnau, 1842
- Diopatra khargiana Wesenberg-Lund, 1949
- Diopatra kristiani Paxton, 1998
- Diopatra leuckarti Kinberg, 1865
- Diopatra lilliputiana Paxton, 1993
- Diopatra longicornis Kinberg, 1865
- Diopatra longissima Grube, 1850
- Diopatra maculata Paxton, 1993
- Diopatra madeirensis Langerhans, 1880
- Diopatra malabarensis Quatrefages, 1866
- Diopatra marinae Steiner & Amaral sp. nov.
- Diopatra marocensis Paxton, Fadlaoui & Lechapt, 1995
- Diopatra micrura Pires, Paxton, Quintino & Rodrigues, 2010
- Diopatra monroi Day, 1960
- Diopatra monroviensis Augener, 1918
- Diopatra musseraensis Augener, 1918
- Diopatra neapolitana Delle Chiaje, 1841
- Diopatra neotridens Hartman, 1944
- Diopatra obliqua Hartman, 1944
- Diopatra oligopectinata Paxton, 1993
- Diopatra ornata Moore, 1911
- Diopatra papillata Fauchald, 1968
- Diopatra paradoxa Quatrefages, 1866
- Diopatra pectiniconicum Steiner & Amaral sp. nov.
- Diopatra rhizoicola Hartmann-Schröder, 1960
- Diopatra rhizophorae Grube, 1856
- Diopatra semperi Grube, 1878
- Diopatra splendidissima Kinberg, 1865
- Diopatra sugokai Izuka, 1907
- Diopatra tridentata Hartman, 1944
- Diopatra uncinifera Quatrefages, 1866
- Diopatra variabilis Southern, 1921
- Diopatra victoriae Steiner & Amaral sp. nov.
- Diopatra viridis Kinberg, 1865
