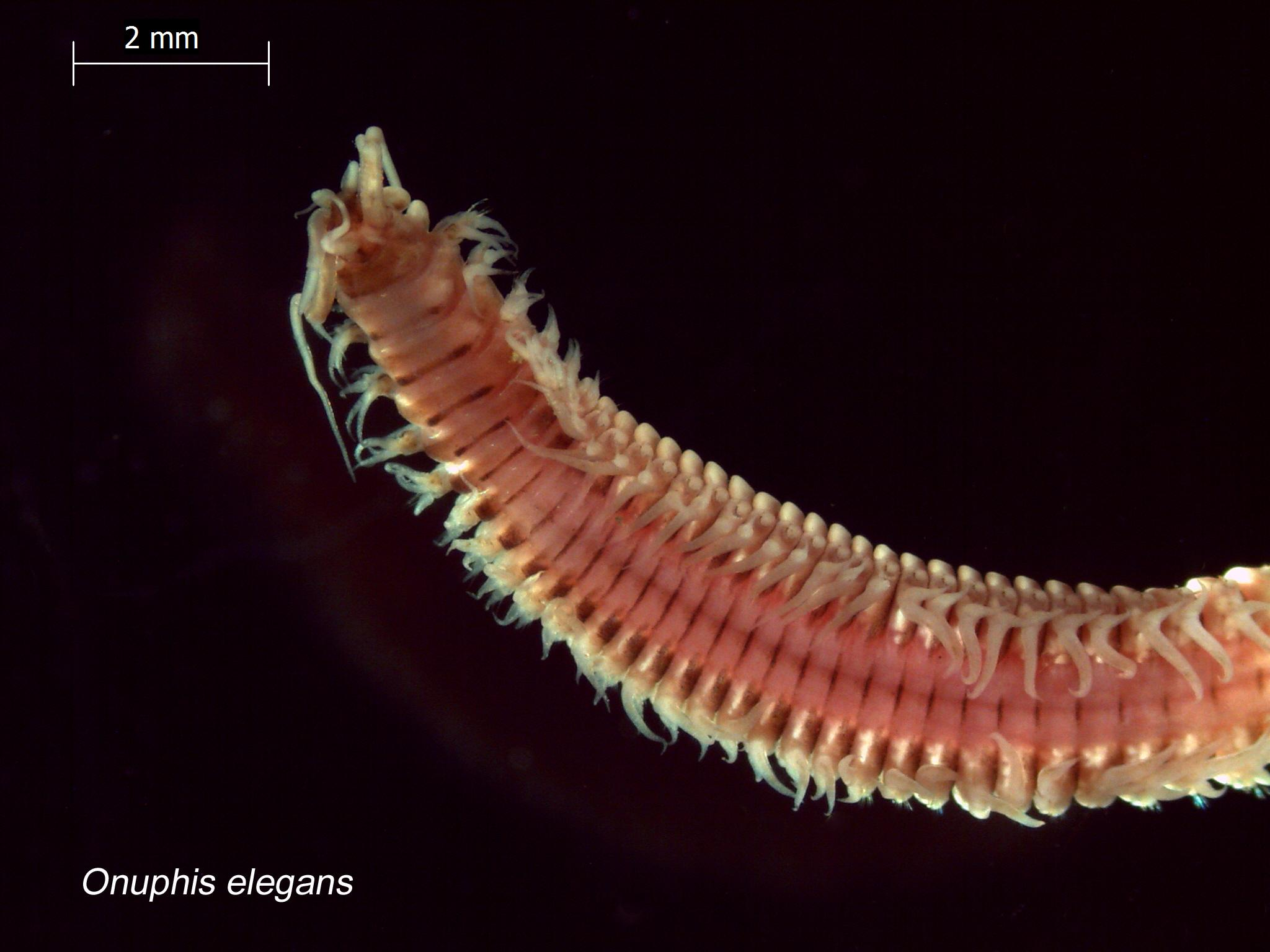
- Onuphis elegans

Scientific classification
- Kingdom: Animalia
- Phylum: Annelida
- Clade: Pleistoannelida
- Subclass: Errantia
- Order: Eunicida
- Family: Onuphidae
- Genus: Onuphis; Audouin & Milne Edwards, 1833

= Onuphis (annelid) =

Genus of annelid worms

Onuphis is a genus of polychaete belonging to the family Onuphidae.

The genus has cosmopolitan distribution.

Species:

- Onuphis affinis Hilbig, 1995
- Onuphis amakusaensis Maekawa & Hayashi, 1999
- Onuphis anadonae Arias & Paxton, 2015
- Onuphis atlantisa
- Onuphis aucklandensis Augener, 1924
- Onuphis augeneri Arias, 2016
- Onuphis branchiata Treadwell, 1931
- Onuphis brevicirris Hartmann-Schröder, 1959
- Onuphis chinensis Uschakov & Wu, 1962
- Onuphis declivorum Fauchald, 1982
- Onuphis dibranchiata Willey, 1905
- Onuphis elegans (Johnson, 1901)
- Onuphis eremita Audouin & Milne Edwards, 1833
- Onuphis erici Arias, Nunez & Paxton, 2017
- Onuphis farallonensis Hobson, 1971
- Onuphis farensis Gil & Machado, 2014
- Onuphis fuscata Imajima, 1986
- Onuphis geophiliformis (Moore, 1903)
- Onuphis hanneloreae Arias, 2016
- Onuphis hokkaiensis Maekawa & Hayashi, 1999
- Onuphis holobranchiata Marenzeller, 1879
- Onuphis imajimai Maekawa & Hayashi, 1989
- Onuphis iridescens (Johnson, 1901)
- Onuphis iriei Maekawa & Hayashi, 1999
- Onuphis kammurijimaensis Maekawa & Hayashi, 1989
- Onuphis landanaensis Augener, 1918
- Onuphis longisetosa Imajima, 1986
- Onuphis mexicana (Fauchald, 1968)
- Onuphis multiannulata Shisko, 1981
- Onuphis nakaoi Maekawa & Hayashi, 1999
- Onuphis nonpectinata Imajima, 1986
- Onuphis opalina (Verrill, 1873)
- Onuphis pallida (Moore, 1911)
- Onuphis pancerii Claparède, 1868
- Onuphis pseudoiridescens Averincev, 1972
- Onuphis punggolensis Tan & Chou, 1998
- Onuphis rullieriana (Amoureux, 1977)
- Onuphis setosa Kinberg, 1865
- Onuphis shijikiensis Maekawa & Hayashi, 1999
- Onuphis shirikishinaiensis (Imajima, 1960)
- Onuphis similis (Fauchald, 1968)
- Onuphis taraba Maekawa & Hayashi, 1989
- Onuphis tetradentata Imajima, 1986
- Onuphis texana Fauchald, 1982
- Onuphis tosaensis Maekawa & Hayashi, 1999
- Onuphis uschakovi Wu & Xu, 2017
- Onuphis variolata Shen, 1987
- Onuphis vibex (Fauchald, 1972)
