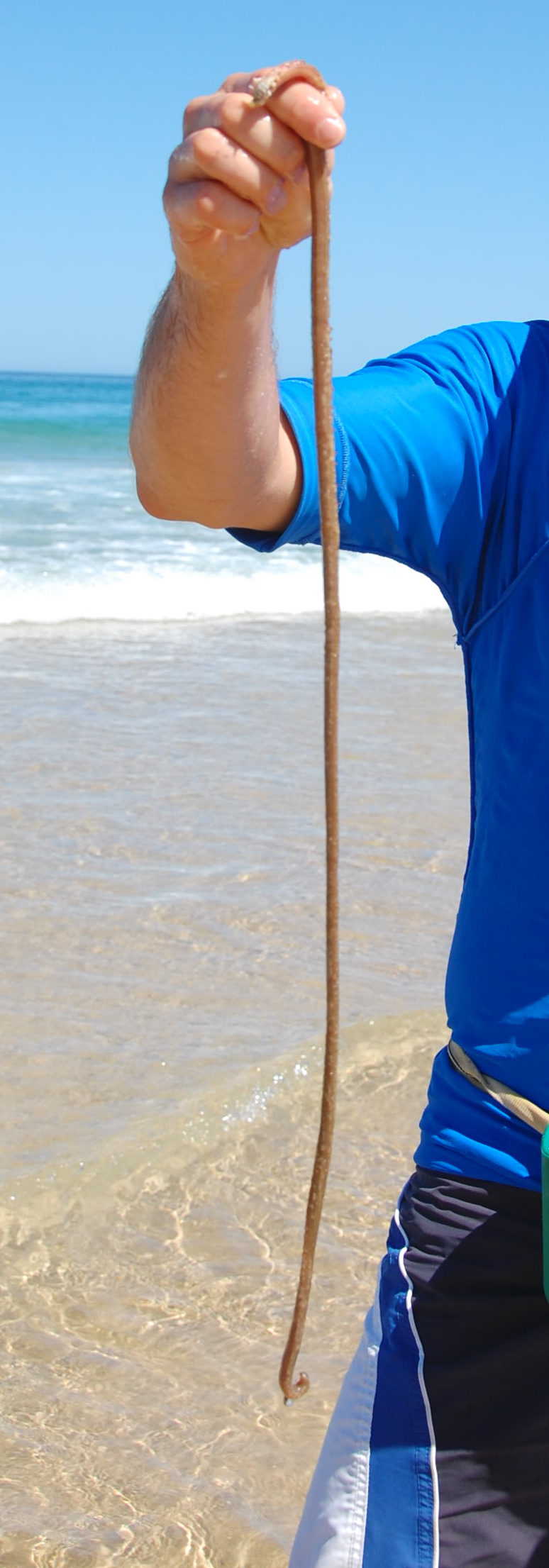
- Australonuphis

Scientific classification
- Kingdom: Animalia
- Phylum: Annelida
- Clade: Pleistoannelida
- Subclass: Errantia
- Order: Eunicida
- Family: Onuphidae; Kinberg, 1865

Genera
- See text

= Onuphidae =

Family of annelid worms

The Onuphidae are a family of polychaete worms.

== Characteristics ==
Most onuphids have tubes. Some live semisubmerged in the substrate, but others carry their tubes around, and they can all rebuild their tubes if necessary. The tubes, thin and parchment-like, are formed of bits of shell and sand, with plant debris, stuck together with mucus. The onuphids are all omnivorous scavengers, feeding on animal and vegetable debris.

The prostomium has two short frontal antennae, two globular palps and five main antennae. The mandibles are large and the maxillae have several pairs of plates edged with fine teeth. Some tentacular cirri are present. The anterior parapodium points forward and has tapered ventral cirri. The posterior parapodium has cushion-like cirri. The setae include winged capillaries and pseudocompound forms on the anterior parapodia and winged capillaries, comb-setae and acicular setae on the posterior ones.

== Genera ==
The World Register of Marine Species includes these genera in the family:

- Americonuphis Fauchald, 1973
- Anchinothria Paxton, 1986
- Aponuphis Kucheruk, 1978
- Australonuphis Paxton, 1986
- Brevibrachium Paxton, 1986
- Diopatra Audouin & Milne Edwards, 1833
- Dualgenys †
- Epidiopatra Augener, 1918
- Fauchaldonuphis Paxton, 2005
- Hartmanonuphis Paxton, 1986
- Heptaceras Ehlers, 1868
- Hirsutonuphis Paxton, 1986
- Hyalinoecia Malmgren, 1867
- Hyalospinifera Kucheruk, 1979
- Kinbergonuphis Fauchald, 1982
- Leptoecia Chamberlin, 1919
- Longibrachium Paxton, 1986
- Mooreonuphis Fauchald, 1982
- Neonuphis
- Nothria Malmgren, 1866
- Notonuphis Kucheruk, 1978
- Onuphis Audouin & Milne Edwards, 1833
- Paradiopatra Ehlers, 1887
- Parahyalinoecia
- Paranorthia
- Paraonuphis
- Parhyalinoecia
- Paronuphis Ehlers, 1887
- Paxtonia Budaeva & Fauchald, 2011
- Protodiopatra Budaeva & Fauchald, 2011
- Rhamphobrachium Ehlers, 1887
