= Macrochaeta natalensis =

Scientific classification
- Domain: Eukaryota
- Kingdom: Animalia
- Phylum: Annelida
- Clade: Pleistoannelida
- Clade: Sedentaria
- Order: Terebellida
- Family: Acrocirridae
- Genus: Macrochaeta
- Species: M. natalensis

Binomial name
- Macrochaeta natalensis (Hartmann-Schröder, 1996)

Species of annelid

Macrochaeta natalensis is a polychaete which belongs to the Acrocirridae family. The body of this worm consists of a head, a cylindrical, segmented body and a tail piece. The head consists of a prostomium (part of the mouth's opening) and a peristomium (area around the mouth) and utilized paired appendages (palps, antennae and cirri).

The scientific name of this species was first published in 1996 by Hartmann-Schröder
