= Teuthidodrilus =

Scientific classification
- Kingdom: Animalia
- Phylum: Annelida
- Clade: Pleistoannelida
- Clade: Sedentaria
- Order: Terebellida
- Family: Acrocirridae
- Genus: Teuthidodrilus; Osborn, Madin & Rouse, 2010
- Species: T. samae

Binomial name
- Teuthidodrilus samae Osborn, Madin & Rouse, 2010

Genus of annelid worms

Teuthidodrilus samae, dubbed as the squidworm, is a species of acrocirrid marine annelid worms. It is free-swimming and can be found in the deep sea water column at depths of 2,039 to 5,575 m (6,690 to 18,291 ft). It feeds on marine snow and can grow to about 9 cm (3.5 in) in length and 1 cm (0.39 in) in width. It is named for the ten squid-like appendages emerging from its head. It was discovered in 2007 in the benthopelagic zone of the Celebes Sea, near the Tawi-Tawi islands of the Philippines. It is the only species in the genus Teuthidodrilus.

== Discovery ==
Teuthidodrilus samae was discovered in the 2007 "Exploring the Inner Space of the Celebes Sea" expedition by the remotely operated underwater vehicle Global Explorer ROV operated from the Philippine research vessel BRP Hydrographer Presbitero. Seven specimens were observed and collected from the deep-water column of the seafloor) of the Celebes Sea near the Tawi-Tawi islands of the Philippines. This area is part of the Coral Triangle, a location known for its increased biodiversity. The specimens were recovered at depths ranging from 2,039 to 2,912 m (6,690 to 9,554 ft), all within the demersal zone of around 100 m (330 ft) from the seafloor.

== Taxonomy ==
Teuthidodrilus samae is the only species classified in the genus Teuthidodrilus. It belongs to the family Acrocirridae of the class Polychaeta in the phylum Annelida. It is classified along with the genus Swima in the "swimming clade" within the family Acrocirridae. A similar undescribed and uncollected specimen observed from off western India by the Hercules 7 ROV in 2004 may represent a second species in the genus.

The generic name comes from Greek for "squid worm", while the specific name is in honor of the Sama people of the Tawi-Tawi islands. The holotype is deposited in the National Museum of the Philippines.

== Physical characteristics ==
The collected specimens ranged in size from 2 to 9.4 cm (0.79 to 3.70 in) in body length. The holotype has a body width of around 1 cm (0.39 in). Adults are light brown when alive, becoming light black in color when preserved. Juveniles are almost transparent.

The body is divided into 25 segments (chaetigers) with pairs of large flattened paddle-shaped notopodia, around 15 mm (0.59 in) in length. Each notopodium has greater than 50 chaetae (bristles) arranged into a fin-like shape, except the first segment which has less than 10. Alongside the notopodia are pairs of neuropodia, each with around 2 to 4 chaetae.

The head segment (prostomium) supports five pairs of long appendages. Four pairs of appendages are sensory and breathing organs (branchiae) at least 68 mm (2.7 in) in length. They are arranged along the upper and side ridges of the head, arising from the pair of feather-like nuchal organs which analyze chemical signals in the sea. The fifth pair of appendages are grooved and coiled feeding palps arising from below the mouth, which is located in the front-bottom corner of the head.

Their internal anatomy is relatively visible from the outside since their outer body is semi-transparent. Two parallel ventral nerve cords run lengthwise throughout the body, fusing into two pairs of ganglia in each segment. The gut forms three loops in the second to sixth segments. The circulatory system consists of a heart body and large vessels leading to the gills. The pair of nephridia extends from the first segment to the fifth segment. The female gonads are located in the second to fourth segments with beige-colored grape-like clusters of variously sized ova (with a maximum diameter of 1 mm (0.039 in)).

== Behavioral characteristics ==
Not much is known of this creature's behavior other than its ability to swim with proficiency using their paddle-like notopodia. It is categorized as a suspension feeder since it consumes marine snow, which consists of pieces from animals, plants, feces and other organic materials that precipitate from the higher parts of the ocean towards the abyss.

In total, sixteen specimens were observed and seven were collected within just a few dives suggesting that this animal is a common member of the benthopelagic community of the Celebes Sea basin.
