= Sama-Bajau =

Group of Austronesian people of Maritime Southeast Asia

Sama
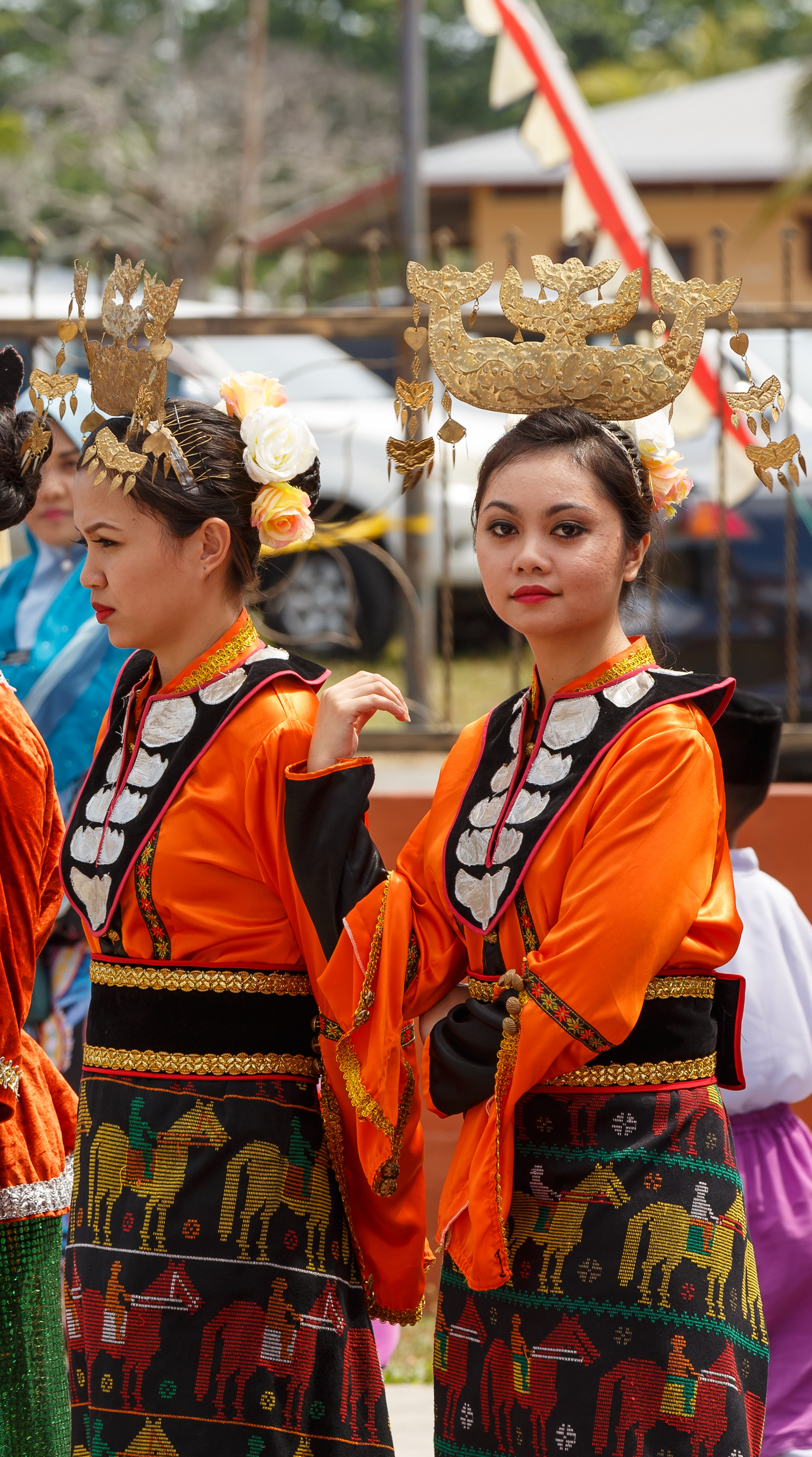
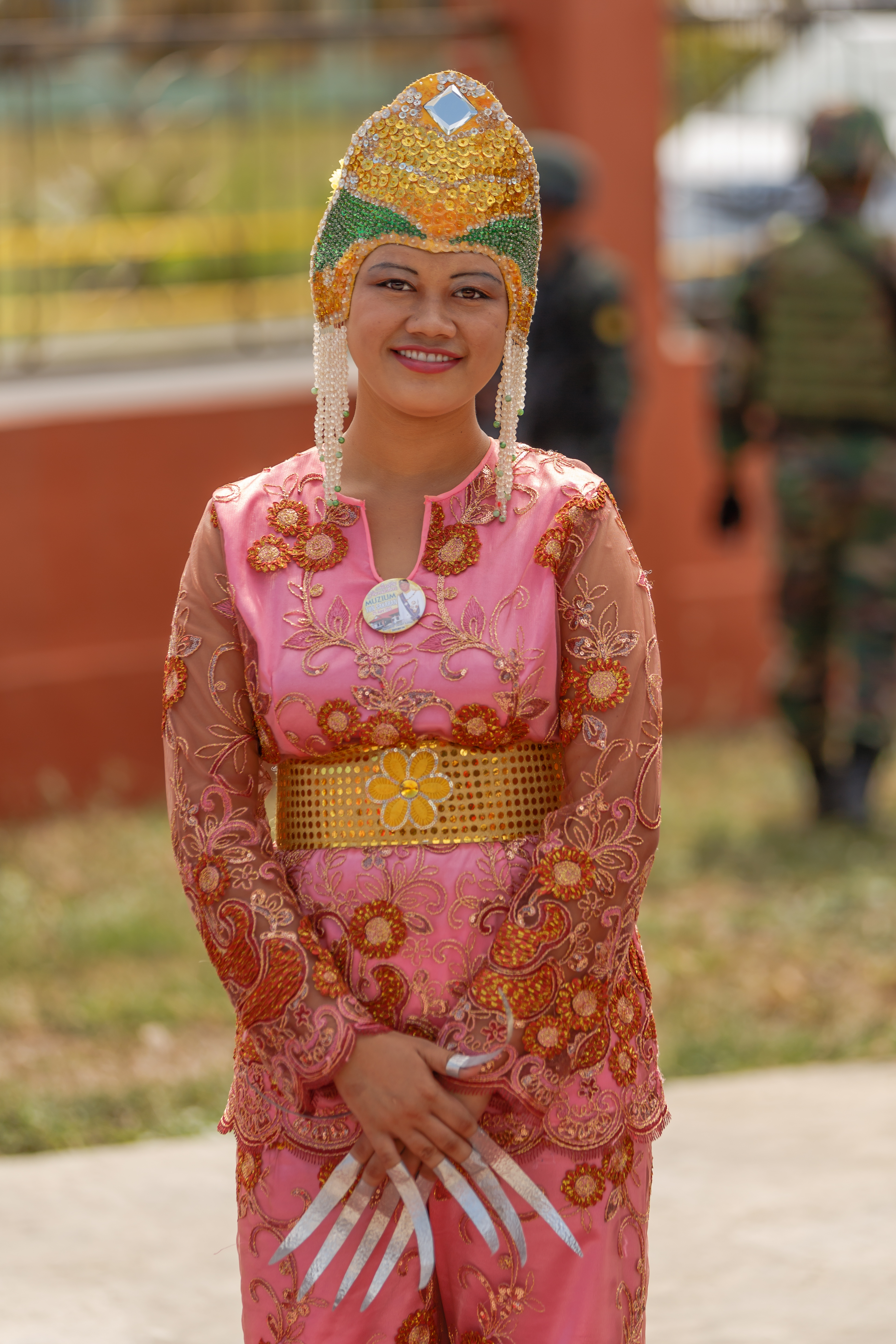
- (Top) West Coast Bajau women of Sabah in their traditional dress (Bottom) An East Coast Bajau woman of Sabah in their traditional dress

Total population
- 1.3 million worldwide

Regions with significant populations
- Philippines: 499,620
- Malaysia: 456,672
- Indonesia: 241,836
- Brunei: ~12,000

Languages
- Sama–Bajaw languages (native), Dusun, Tausug, Rungus (secondary), Chavacano, Cebuano, Filipino, Malay (Sabah Malay & Standard Malay), English (in both Philippines & Malaysia), Indonesian

Religion
- Predominantly: Sunni Islam

Related ethnic groups
- Yakan, Iranun, Lumad, Malagasy; Other Greater Barito-speaking peoples, Tausūg, other Moros, Filipinos; Malays, Bugis, and other wider Austronesian peoples

The Sama-Bajau include several Austronesian ethnic groups of Maritime Southeast Asia. The name collectively refers to related people who usually call themselves the Sama or Samah (formally A'a Sama, "Sama people"); or are known by the exonym Bajau (/ˈbɑːdʒaʊ, ˈbæ-/, also spelled Badjao, Bajaw, Badjau, Badjaw, Bajo or Bayao). They usually live a seaborne lifestyle and use small wooden sailing vessels such as the perahu (layag in Maranao), djenging (balutu), lepa, and vinta (pilang). They also use medium-sized vessels like the jungkung, timbawan and small fishing vessels like biduk and bogo-katik. Some Sama-Bajau groups native to Sabah are also known for their traditional horse culture.

The Sama-Bajau are the dominant ethnic group of the islands of Tawi-Tawi. They are also found in other islands of the Sulu Archipelago, coastal areas of Mindanao and other islands in the southern Philippines; as well as northern and eastern Borneo, Sulawesi, and throughout the eastern Indonesian islands. In the Philippines, they are grouped with the religiously similar Moro people. Within the last fifty years, many of the Filipino Sama-Bajau have migrated to neighbouring Sabah and the northern islands of the Philippines, due to the conflict in Mindanao. As of 2010, they were the second-largest ethnic group in Sabah.

Sama-Bajau have sometimes been called the "Sea Gypsies" or "Sea Nomads", terms that have also been used for non-related ethnic groups with similar traditional lifestyles, such as the Moken of the Burmese-Thai Mergui Archipelago, the Orang Laut of southeastern Sumatra and the Riau Islands of Indonesia along with Singapore, and the Tanka people of Southern China. The modern outward spread of the Sama-Bajau from older inhabited areas seems to have been associated with the development of sea trade in sea cucumber (trepang).

== Ethnonym ==
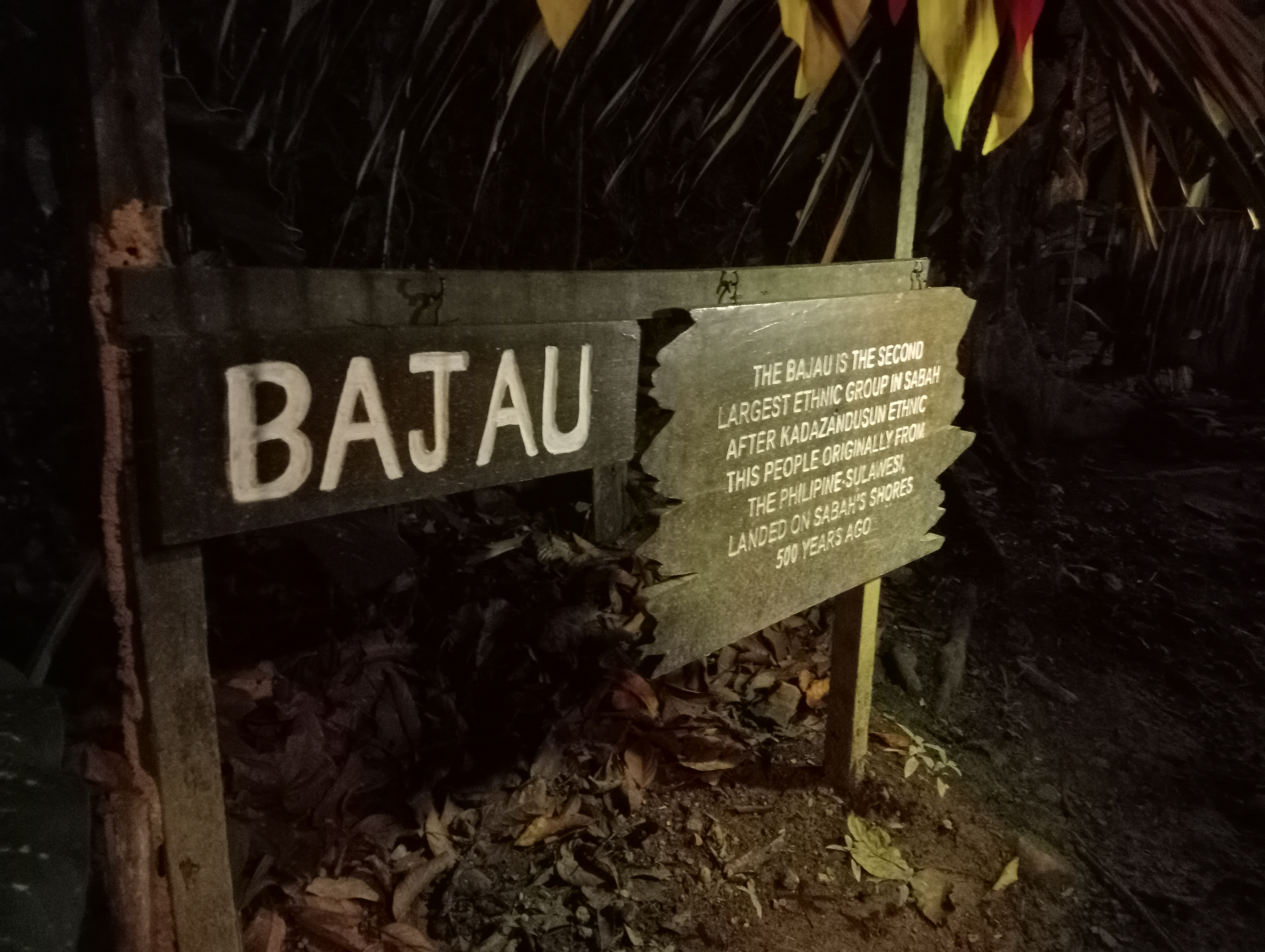
Bajaus tribe sign at the Mari Mari Cultural Village in Inanam, Kota Kinabalu District of Sabah, Malaysia

Sama-Bajau is a collective term, referring to several closely related indigenous people who consider themselves a single distinct bangsa ("ethnic group" or "nation"). It is generally accepted that these groups of people can be termed Sama or Bajau, though they never call themselves Bajau in the Philippines. Instead, they call themselves with the names of their tribes, usually the place they live or their place of origin. For example, the sea-going Sama-Bajau prefer to call themselves the Sama Dilaut or Sama Mandilaut (literally 'sea Sama' or 'ocean Sama') in the Philippines; in Malaysia, they identify as Bajau Laut. Sea-going Bajau are given the pejorative name Pala'au or Palauh by other Bajau groups, which has been adopted by Malaysian mainstream media.

Historically in the Philippines, the term Sama referred to the more land-oriented and settled Sama–Bajau groups, while Bajau referred only to more sea-oriented, boat-dwelling, nomadic groups. Even these distinctions are fading as the majority of Sama-Bajau have long since abandoned boat living, most for Sama-style piling houses in the coastal shallows.

Sama is believed to have originated from the Austronesian root word sama meaning "together", "same", or "kin". The exact origin of the exonym Bajau is unclear. Some authors have proposed that it is derived from a corruption of the Malay word berjauh ('getting further apart' or 'the state of being away') or in Indonesian word it means boat dwelling. Other possible origins include the Brunei Malay word bajaul, which means "to fish". The term Bajau has pejorative connotations in the Philippines, indicating poverty in comparison to the term Sama, especially since it is used most commonly to refer to poverty-stricken Sama-Bajau who make a living through begging.

British administrators in Sabah classified the Sama-Bajau as "Bajau" and labelled them as such in their birth certificates. Thus, the Sama-Bajau in Malaysia may sometimes self-identify as "Bajau". The Malaysian government recognizes the Sama-Bajau as legally Bumiputera under the "Bajau" subgroup which guarantees easy access to the special sociopolitical privileges also granted to Malaysian Malays; to a point of them identifying as "Malay" for political reasons. This is especially true for recent Moro Filipino migrants. The indigenous Sama-Bajau in Malaysia have also started labelling themselves as their ancestors called themselves, such as Simunul.

In the 17th-century, the Spanish priest Francisco Combés calls the Sama-Bajau as the Lutao ("[people who] float on water") in his Historia de las Islas de Mindanao, Iolo, y sus adyacentes (1667), and describes them as building houses on the sea because they "hate land". They were described as being the subjects of the Sultanates of Sulu and Maguindanao, and they were esteemed for their shipbuilding skills and were commonly hired as crews of warships.

== History and origin ==
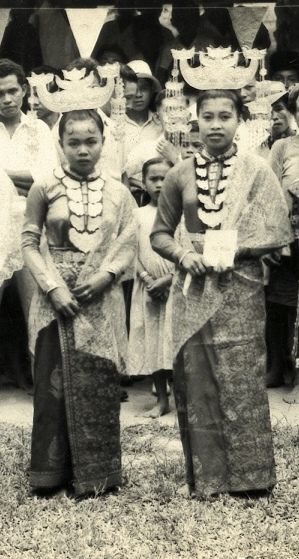
Two West Coast Bajau women (Bajau Samah) in traditional dress, Sandakan District, British North Borneo, c. 1920–1930s

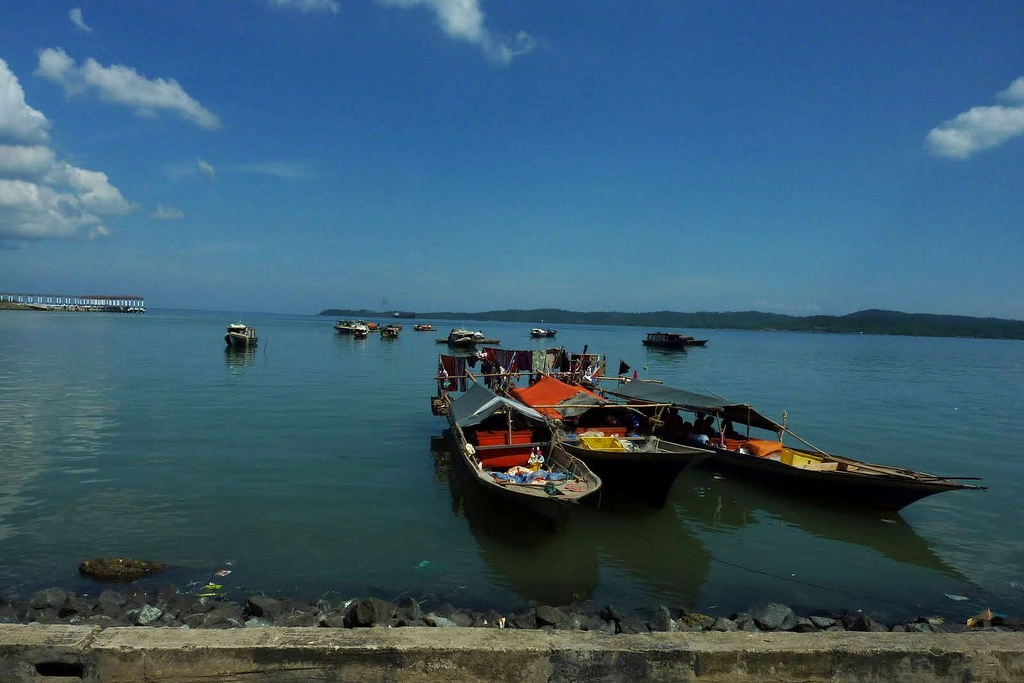
A Sama-Bajau flotilla in Lahad Datu, Sabah, Malaysia

For most of their history, the Sama-Bajau have been a nomadic, seafaring people, living off the sea by trading and subsistence fishing. The boat-dwelling Sama-Bajau see themselves as non-aggressive people. They kept close to the shore by erecting houses on stilts and travelled using lepa, handmade boats which many lived in. A 2021 genetic study shows that some Sama-Bajau have Austroasiatic ancestry.

=== Oral traditions ===
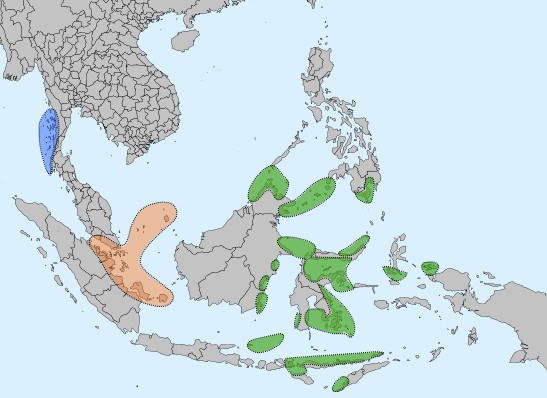
Regions inhabited by peoples usually known as "Sea Nomads" Sama-Bajau Orang Laut Moken

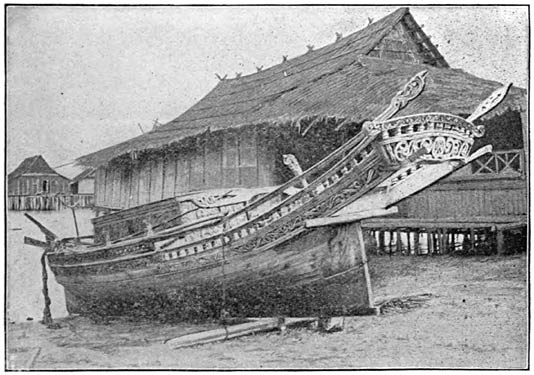
A Sama lepa houseboat from the Philippines (c. 1905)

Most of the various oral traditions and tarsila (royal genealogies) among the Sama-Bajau have a common theme which claims that they were originally a land-dwelling people who were the subjects of a king who had a daughter. After she is lost by either being swept away to the sea (by a storm or a flood) or being taken captive by a neighbouring kingdom, they were then supposedly ordered to find her. After failing to do so they decided to remain nomadic for fear of facing the wrath of the king.

One such version widely told among the Sama-Bajau of Borneo claims that they descended from Johorean royal guards who were escorting a princess named Dayang Ayesha for marriage to a ruler in Sulu. However, the Sultan of Brunei (allegedly Muhammad Shah of Brunei) also fell in love with the princess. On the way to Sulu, they were attacked by Bruneians in the high seas. The princess was taken captive and married to the Sultan of Brunei instead. The escorts, having lost the princess, elected to settle in Borneo and Sulu rather than return to Johor. This legend is popular among Sabah Sama-Bajau as it legitimises their claim to "Malay-ness" and strengthens their ties to Islam, which puts them in a favourable position in the Bumiputera laws of Malaysia (similar to the usage of the name "Bajau" instead of "Sama").

A second version of the oral stories is told among the Bajau Kubang of Semporna where two siblings named Haklum Nuzum and Salingayah Bungsu from Sulu compete in a boat race to marry a beautiful princess from Johor Sultanate. The boat race was held by Sultan Mahalikul Alam of Johor where the brothers need to sail all the way to Pulau Angsa which is located near the coast of Johor. During the race, the boat sailed by Salingayah Bungsu broke, which led to his defeat. He then promised to not return to Johor and continue his journey all the way to "Sambuanga" (Zamboanga) in southern Philippines where he married a woman and was blessed with a son and daughter later on. It was believed that his children committed the act of incest which led to him leaving them and sailing to "Omaral" (Omadal Island) out of shame. On the island, his descendants continue to spread and eventually moved to Bum-Bum Island which is located beside mainland Semporna and the place where they gather is named "Kubang" which means "assemble or gather". This migration from Omadal Island to Bum-Bum island caused them to lose their nomadic culture and identity which led to the creation of a new Sama-Bajau sub-ethnic group called Bajau Kubang, Bajau Darat (land Bajau) or Bajau Sampulna (Semporna).

Among the Indonesian Sama-Bajau, on the other hand, their oral histories place more importance on the relationship of the Sama-Bajau with the Sultanate of Gowa rather than Johor. The various versions of their origin myth tell about a royal princess who was washed away by a flood. She was found and eventually married a king or a prince of Gowa. Their offspring then allegedly became the ancestors of the Indonesian Sama-Bajau.

However, there are other versions that are more mythological and do not mention a princess. Among the Philippine Sama-Bajau, for example, there is a myth that claims that the Sama-Bajau were accidentally towed into what is now Zamboanga by a giant stingray. Incidentally, the native pre-Hispanic name of Zamboanga City is "Samboangan" (literally "mooring place"), which was derived from the Sinama word for a mooring pole, sambuang or samboang.

=== Modern research on origins ===
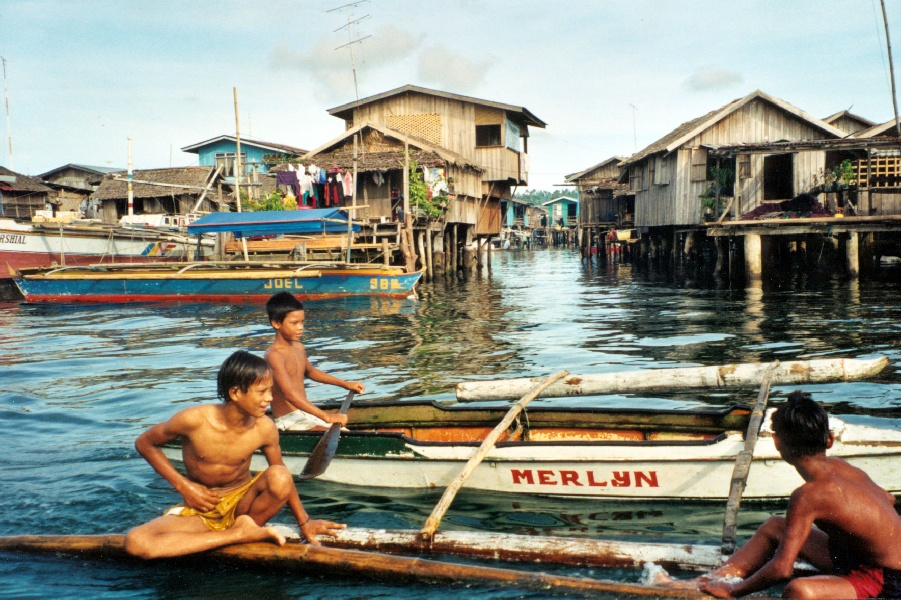
Sama-Bajau children in Basilan

The origin myths claiming descent from Johor or Gowa have been largely rejected by modern scholars, mostly because these kingdoms were established too recently to explain the ethnic divergence. Whether the Sama-Bajau are indigenous to their current territories or settled from elsewhere is still contentious. Linguistically, they are distinct from neighbouring populations, especially from the Tausūg who are more closely related to the northern Philippine ethnic groups like the Visayans.

In 1965, the anthropologist David E. Sopher claimed that the Sama-Bajau, along with the Orang Laut, descended from ancient "Veddoid" (Australoid) (Note: The concept of an Australoid "race" is antiquated. Most modern literature refer to these peoples as the Australo-Melanesians. However, their exact relationship within their member groups and with other ethnic groups in Asia and Oceania is still debated.) hunter-gatherers from the Riau Archipelago who intermarried with Austronesians. They retained their hunter-gatherer lifestyle, though they became more maritime-oriented as Southeast Asia became more populated by later Austronesian settlers.

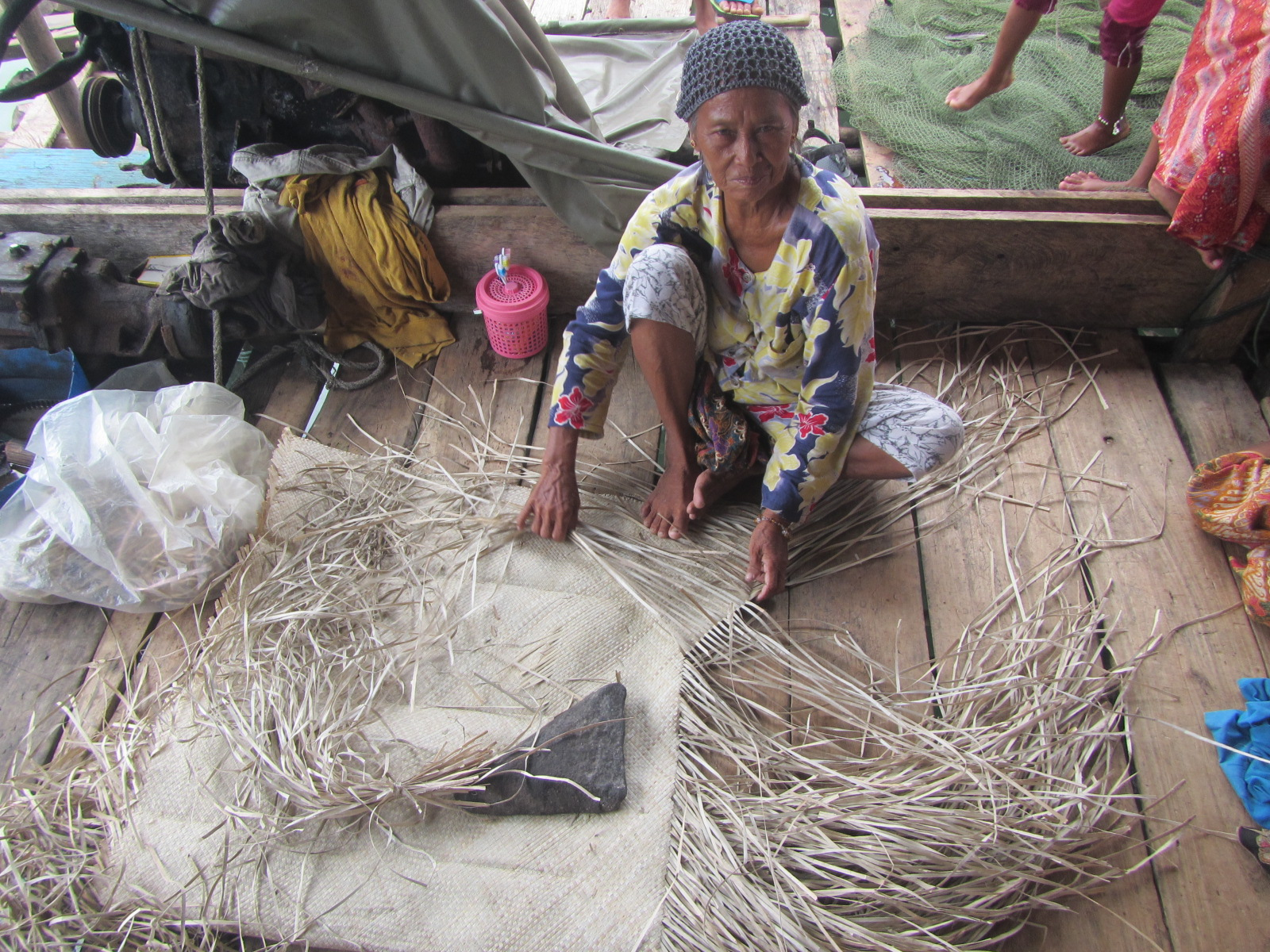
A Sama woman making a traditional mat in Semporna, Sabah, Malaysia

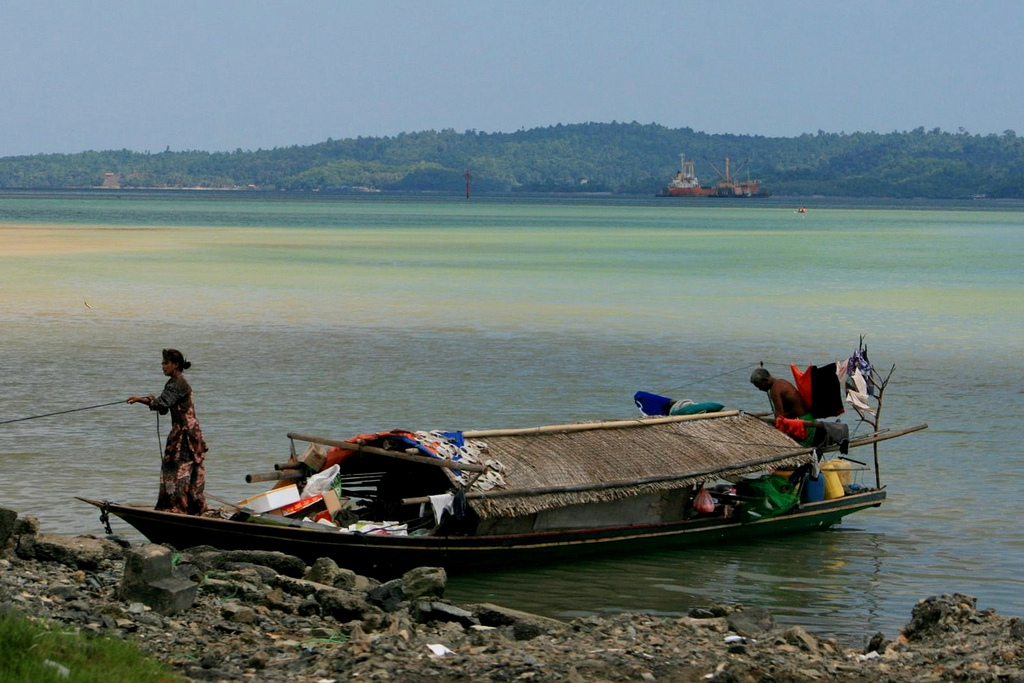
Sama-Bajau woman anchoring a family boat (banglo) in Malaysia

In 1968, the anthropologist Harry Arlo Nimmo, on the other hand, believed that the Sama-Bajau are indigenous to the Sulu Archipelago, Sulawesi, and/or Borneo, and do not share a common origin with the Orang Laut. Nimmo proposed that the boat-dwelling lifestyle developed among the ancestors of the Sama-Bajau independently from the Orang Laut.

A more recent study in 1985 by the anthropologist Alfred Kemp Pallasen compares the oral traditions with historical facts and linguistic evidence. He puts the date of the ethnogenesis of Sama-Bajau as 800 AD and also rejects a historical connection between the Sama-Bajau and the Orang Laut. He hypothesises that the Sama-Bajau originated from a proto-Sama-Bajau people inhabiting the Zamboanga Peninsula who practised both fishing and slash-and-burn agriculture. They were the original inhabitants of Zamboanga and the Sulu archipelago, and were well-established in the region long before the first arrival of the Tausūg people at around the 13th century from their homelands along the northern coast of eastern Mindanao. Along with the Tausūg, they were heavily influenced by the Malay kingdoms both culturally and linguistically, becoming Indianised by the 15th century and Islamised by the 16th century. They also engaged in extensive trade with China for "luxury" sea products like trepang, pearls, and shark fin.

From Zamboanga, some members of these people adopted an exclusively seaborne culture and spread outwards in the 10th century towards Basilan, Sulu, Borneo, and Sulawesi. They arrived in Borneo in the 11th century. This hypothesis is currently the most widely accepted among specialists studying the Austronesian peoples. This would also explain why even boat-dwelling Sama-Bajau still practice agricultural rituals, despite being exclusively fishermen. Linguistic evidence further points to Borneo as the ultimate origin of the proto-Sama-Bajau people.

A genetic study of three groups—the Derawan of Northeast Borneo, the Kotabaru of Southeast Borneo, and the Kendari of Southeast Sulawesi—suggested that their origin was in southern Sulawesi. Their ethnogenesis is estimated to have dated back to around the 4th century AD by an admixture event between the Bugis people and a Papuan group. The authors suggest that the Sama moved to eastern Borneo at around the 11th century AD, and then towards northern Borneo and the southern Philippines at around the 13th to 14th centuries AD. They hypothesize that they were driven to migrate during the increase of influence and trading activities of the Srivijaya Empire. Genetically, the Sama-Bajau are highly diverse, indicating heavy admixture with the locals or even language and cultural adoption by coastal groups in the areas they settled. However, the study is restricted to the Indonesian Bajo subgroup, and the authors recommend additional studies from Sama-Bajau groups in neighbouring regions.

A 2021 genetic study discovered a unique genetic signal among the Sama-Bajau of the Philippines and Indonesia. This genetic signal (called the "Sama ancestry" by the authors) identifies them as descendants of an ancient migration of Austroasiatic-affiliated hunter-gatherer groups from mainland Southeast Asia via the now sunken land bridges of Sundaland around 15,000 to 12,000 years ago. These populations admixed with both the preexisting Negrito populations, and later on, the incoming migrations of the Austronesian peoples (also adopting an Austronesian language in the process). They are genetically clustered with the Lua and Mlabri peoples of mainland Southeast Asia, as well as the Manobo people of mainland Mindanao. The study also identifies minimal South Asian gene flow among Sama populations starting at around 1000 years ago. Sama ancestry was highest among the Sama Dilaut, followed by more land-based Sama. But it was also detected among other ethnic groups that do not self-identify as Sama in Palawan, Zamboanga, Basilan, Sulu, and Tawi-Tawi.

=== Historical records ===
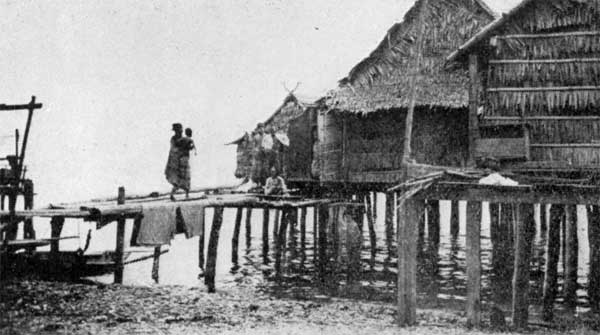
Sama-Bajau houses in Cawa Cawa, Zamboanga City, Philippines, 1923

The epic poem Darangen of the Maranao people record that among the ancestors of the hero Bantugan is a Maranao prince who married a Sama-Bajau princess. Estimated to have happened in AD 840, it is the oldest account of the Sama-Bajau. It further corroborates the fact that they predate the arrival of the Tausūg settlers and are indigenous to the Sulu archipelago and parts of Mindanao.

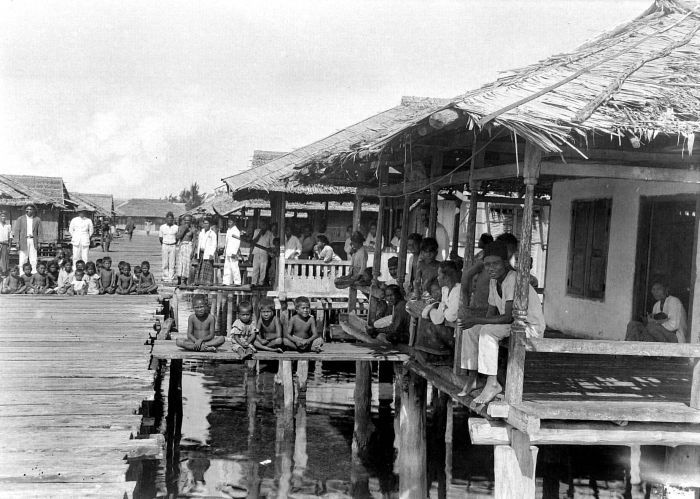
Residents of a Bajau kampung in Afdeeling Ternate, Groote Oost, Dutch East Indies (present-day North Maluku, Indonesia) c. 1925

Sama-Bajau were first recorded by European explorers in 1521 by Antonio Pigafetta of the Magellan-Elcano expedition in what is now the Zamboanga Peninsula. Pigafetta writes that the "people of that island make their dwellings in boats and do not live otherwise". They have also been present in the written records of other Europeans henceforth; including in Sulawesi by the Dutch colonies in 1675, in Sulawesi and eastern Borneo by Thomas Forrest in the 1770s, and in the west coast of Borneo by Spenser St. John in the 1850s and 1860s.

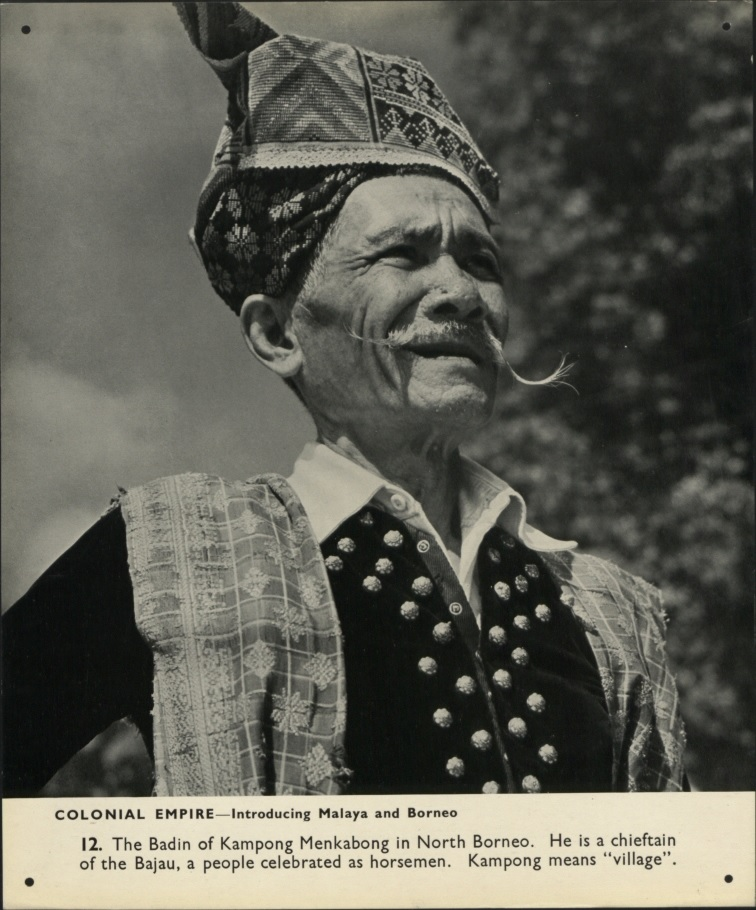
A Bajau chieftain in traditional attire from Kampung Menkabong, Tuaran, British North Borneo, c. 1948

Sama-Bajau were often widely mentioned in connection to sea raids (mangahat), piracy, and the slave trade in Southeast Asia during the European colonial period, indicating that at least some Sama-Bajau groups from northern Sulu (e.g. the Banguingui) were involved, along with non-Sama-Bajau groups like the Iranun. The scope of their pirate activities was extensive, commonly sailing from Sulu to as far as the Moluccas and back again. Aside from early European colonial records, they may have also been the pirates described by Chinese and Arabian sources in the Straits of Singapore in the 12th and 13th centuries. Sama-Bajau usually served as low-ranking crewmembers of war boats, directly under the command of Iranun squadron leaders, who in turn answered to the Tausūg datu of the Sultanate of Sulu.

The Bajoe harbour in Sulawesi was the site of a small settlement of Sama-Bajau under the Bugis Sultanate of Bone. They were significantly involved in the First and Second Bone Wars (1824–1825) when the Royal Netherlands East Indies Army sent a punitive expedition in retaliation for Bugis and Makassar attacks on local Dutch garrisons. After the fall of Bone, most Sama-Bajau resettled in other areas of Sulawesi.

During the British colonial rule of Sabah, the Sama-Bajau were involved in two uprisings against the North Borneo Chartered Company: the Mat Salleh rebellion from 1894 to 1905, and the Pandasan Affair of 1915.

== Modern Sama-Bajau ==
Percentage population of Bajau by state constituencies in Sabah, Malaysia, according to 2020 census

Modern Sama-Bajau are generally regarded as peaceful, hospitable, and cheerful people, despite their humble circumstances. Due to their nomadic lifestyle, a significant number live in poverty, struggle with literacy, and lack access to formal education.

The number of modern Sama-Bajau who are born and live primarily at sea is diminishing. Cultural assimilation and modernization are regarded as the main causes. Particularly blamed is the dissolution of the Sultanate of Sulu, the traditional patron of the Sama-Bajau for bartering fish for farm goods. The money-based fish markets which replaced the seasonal trade around mooring points necessitates a more land-based lifestyle for greater market penetration.

Starting from the colonial era, some of the native Sama-Bajau in Sabah, Malaysia (such as the West Coast Bajau) start to face the problem of land rights where their native land are not recognized by the government which led to them being evicted from their homes. This also forced them to build new house in government owned land due to the overcrowding problem in their existing land which led to these villages being misidentified as squatter village created by immigrants (due to their similarity in terms of building structure and surrounding). The loss of land can also be attributed to local landowners selling their land for profit or inability to manage it anymore and local leaders like the Pengiran from Brunei Sultanate selling their land to British without discussing with the local villager who had problem in acquiring their own land grant in that area. This land will later on be sold to the local Chinese leading to further marginalization to some of this landless Sama-Bajau. Moreover, some controversial government programs in Indonesia and Malaysia have also resettled the Sama-Bajau to the mainland. However, the Malaysian programmes in particular tried to encourage them to pursue agriculture activities with some incentive.

The Sama-Bajau in the Sulu Archipelago were historically discriminated against by the dominant Tausūg people, who viewed boat-dwelling Sama-Bajau as 'inferior' and as outsiders—the traditional Tausūg term for them is the highly offensive Luwaan, meaning "spat out" or "outcast" based on a folk tale justifying their subservience supposedly out of their trickery and ingratefulness towards God. They were also marginalised by other Moro peoples because they still practised animist folk religions either exclusively or alongside Islam, and thus were viewed as "uncivilised pagans". Boat-dwelling and shoreline Sama-Bajau had a very low status in the caste-based Tausūg Sultanate of Sulu. This survived into the modern Philippines where the Sama-Bajau are still subjected to strong cultural prejudice from the Tausūg. The Sama-Bajau have also been frequent victims of theft, extortion, kidnapping, and violence from the predominantly Tausūg Abu Sayyaf insurgents as well as pirates.

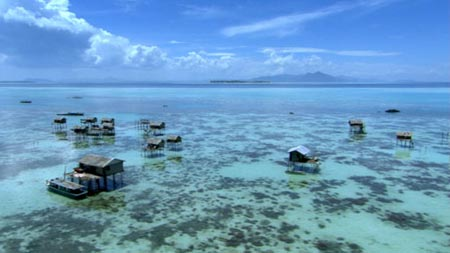
A typical Sama-Bajau settlement in the Philippines

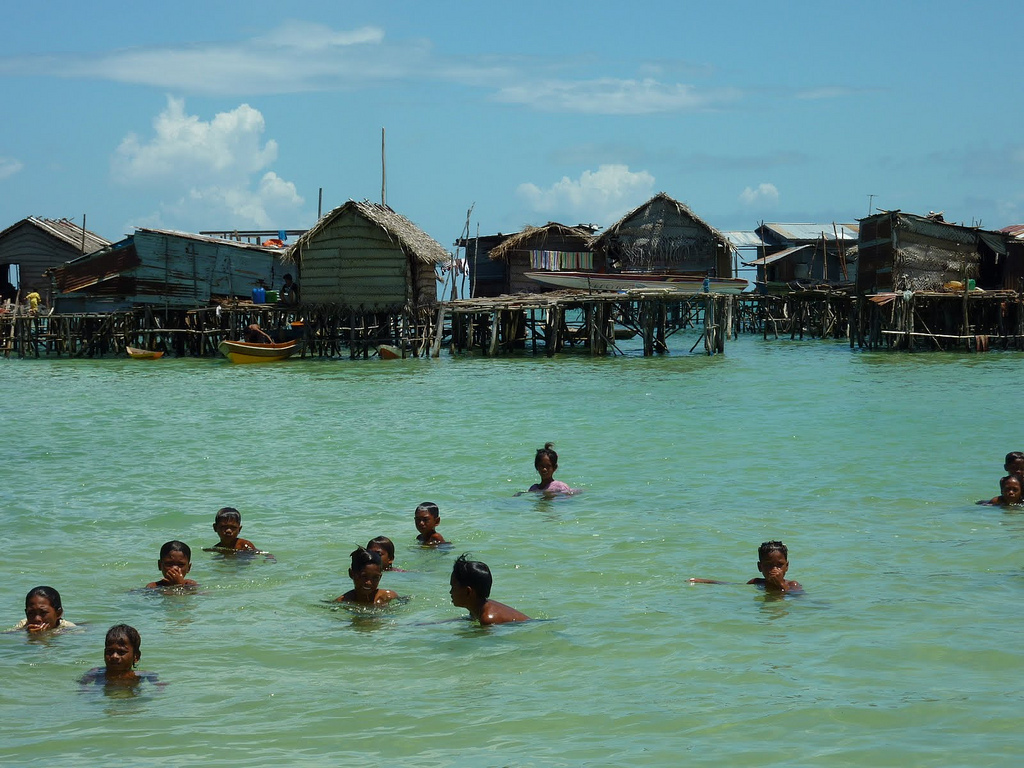
A Sama-Bajau village in Omadal Island, Sabah, Malaysia

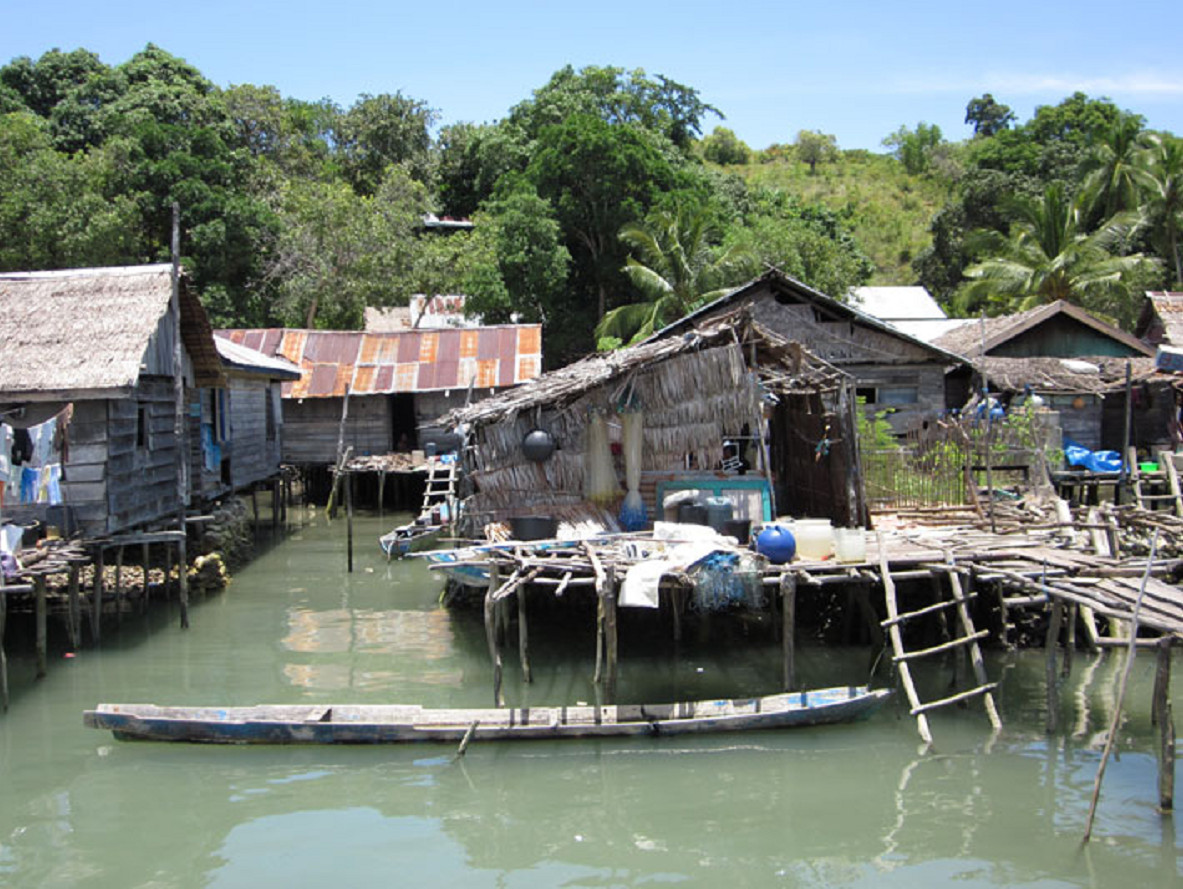
Bokori, a Sama-Bajau village in southwest Sulawesi, Indonesia

This discrimination and the continuing violence in Muslim Mindanao have driven many Sama-Bajau to emigrate. They usually resettle in Malaysia and Indonesia, where they have more employment opportunities. But even in Malaysia, their presence is still controversial as most of them are illegal immigrants. Most illegal Sama-Bajau immigrants enter Malaysia through offshore islands. From there, they enter mainland Sabah to find work as manual labourers. Others migrate to the northern islands of the Philippines, particularly to the Visayas, Palawan, the northern coast of Mindanao, and even as far as southern Luzon. Though these are relatively safer regions, they are also more economically disadvantaged and socially excluded, leading to Filipinos sometimes stereotyping the boat-dwelling Sama-Bajau as beggars and squatters. The ancestral roaming and fishing grounds of the Sama-Bajau straddled the borders of the Philippines, Malaysia, and Indonesia. And they have sometimes voyaged as far as the Timor and Arafura Seas. In modern times, they have lost access to most of these sites. There have been efforts to grant Sama-Bajau some measures of rights to fish in traditional areas, but most Sama-Bajau still suffer from legal persecution. For example, under a 1974 Memorandum of Understanding, "Indonesian traditional fishermen" are allowed to fish within the Exclusive Economic Zone of Australia, which includes traditional fishing grounds of Sama-Bajau fishermen. However, illegal fishing encroachment of corporate sea trawlers in these areas has led to concern about overfishing, and the destruction of Sama-Bajau vessels. In 2014, Indonesian authorities destroyed six Filipino Sama-Bajau boats caught fishing in Indonesian waters. This is particularly serious for the Sama-Bajau, whose boats are also oftentimes their homes.

Sama-Bajau fishermen are often associated with illegal and destructive practices, like blast fishing, cyanide fishing, coral mining, and cutting down mangrove trees. It is believed that the Sama-Bajau resort to these activities mainly due to sedentarisation brought about by the restrictions imposed on their nomadic culture by modern nation states. With their now limited territories, they have little alternative means of competing with better-equipped land-based and commercial fishermen and earn enough to feed their families. The Indonesian government and certain non-governmental organisations have launched several programs for providing alternative sustainable livelihood projects for Sama-Bajau to discourage these practices (such as the use of fish aggregating devices instead of explosives). Medical health centres (puskesmas) and schools have also been built even for stilt-house Sama-Bajau communities. Similar programs have also been implemented in the Philippines.

With the loss of their traditional fishing grounds, some refugee groups of Sama-Bajau in the Philippines are forced to resort to begging (agpangamu in Sinama), particularly diving for coins thrown by inter-island ferry passengers (angedjo). Other traditional sources of income include selling grated cassava (magliis), mat-weaving (ag-tepoh), and jewellery-making (especially from pearls). Recently, there have been more efforts by local governments in the Philippines to rehabilitate Sama-Bajau refugees and teach them livelihood skills. In 2016, the Philippine Bureau of Fisheries and Aquatic Resources started a project for distributing fishing boats, gear, and other livelihood materials among Sama-Bajau communities in Luzon. This was largely the result of raised awareness and an outpouring of support after a photo of a Sama-Bajau beggar, Rita Gaviola (dubbed the "Badjao Girl"), went viral in the Philippines. In response to the economic marginalization of Sama-Bajau communities, local governments in the Philippines have undertaken rehabilitation and livelihood programs intended to improve their opportunities for sustainable employment and greater economic inclusion.

The Bajau continue to face discrimination from fellow Muslims due to their lifestyle. There are have been cases of the Tausug Muslims in Sulu committing takfir towards the Bajau and insulting them by declaring them as non-Muslims, despite the Bajau being a primarily Muslim ethic group. One Tausug Muslim who was interviewed compared killing a Bajau to killing a monkey, saying it was not worth the effort for a juramentado to attack Bajau. In Indonesia negative stereotypes are still perpetuated about the Bajau, ranging from stories of them allegedly using love potions on women to characterizing them as being untrustworthy.

== Subgroups ==
The Sama-Bajau are fragmented into highly diverse subgroups. They have never been politically united and are usually subject to the land-based political groups of the areas they settle, such as the Sultanate of Brunei, the former Sultanate of Sulu and Sultanate of Bone.

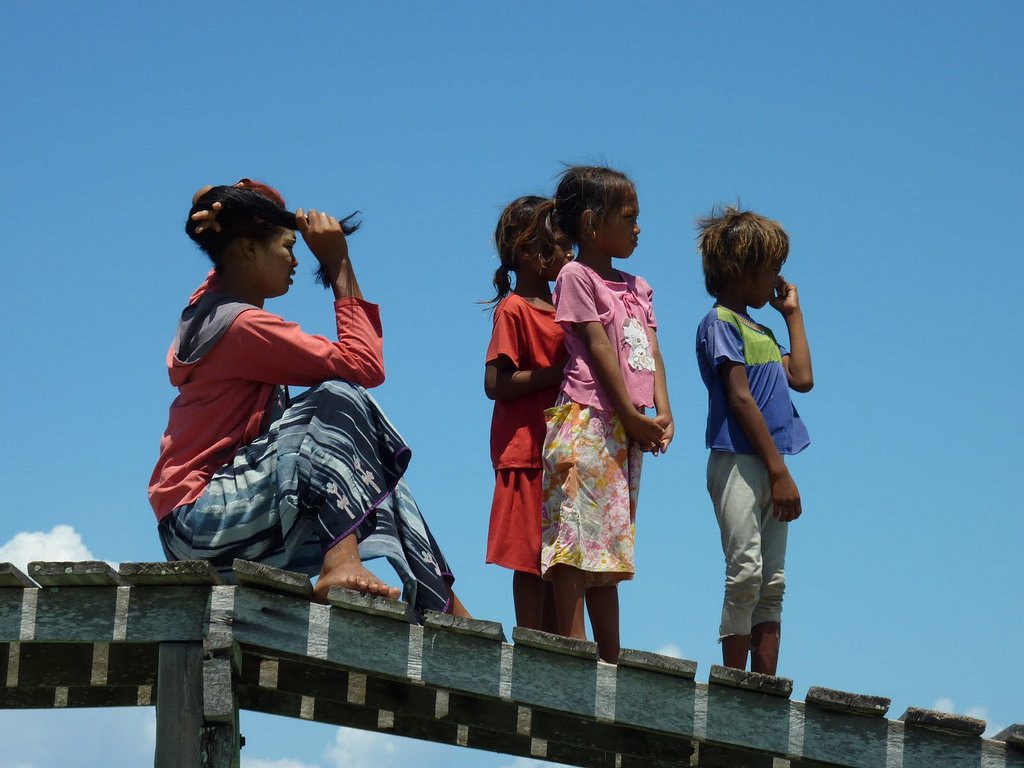
Sama-Bajau woman and children from Omadal Island, Sabah, Malaysia

Most subgroups of Sama-Bajau name themselves after the place they originated from (usually an island). Each subgroup speaks a distinct language or dialect that are usually mutually intelligible with their immediate neighbouring subgroup in a continuous linguistic chain. In the Philippines, the Sama-Bajau can be divided into three general groups based on where they settle:

- Sama Bihing or Sama Lipid – The "shoreline Sama" or "littoral Sama". These are the Sama-Bajau which traditionally lived in stilt houses in shallows and coastal areas. An example is the Sama Simunul. They are originally from the larger islands of Tawi-Tawi. They have a more flexible lifestyle than the Sama-Gimba (Dilaut Origin) and will farm when there is available land. They usually act as middlemen in trade between the Sama Dilaut and other land-based peoples.
- Sama Dea, Sama Deya, Sama Dilaya or Sama Darat – The "land Sama". These are the Sama-Bajau which traditionally lived in island interiors. Some examples are the Sama Sibutu and the Sama Sanga-Sanga. They are usually farmers who cultivate rice, sweet potato, cassava, and coconuts for copra through traditional slash-and-burn agriculture (in contrast to the plow agriculture technology brought by the Tausūg). They are originally from the larger islands of Tawi-Tawi and Pangutaran. In the Philippines, the Sama Dea will often completely differentiate themselves from the Sama Dilaut.
- Sama Dilaut, Sama Mandilaut, Sama Pala'u, or Bajau Laut – The "sea Sama" or "ocean Sama". In the Philippines, the preferred ethnonym is Sama Dilaut; while in Malaysia, they usually identify as Bajau Laut. This subgroup originally lived exclusively on elaborately crafted houseboats called lepa, but almost all have taken to living on land in the Philippines. Their home islands include Sitangkai and Bongao. They are the Sama-Bajau subgroup most commonly called "Bajau" or "Badjao", though Filipino Sama Dilaut considers it offensive. They sometimes call themselves the "Sama To'ongan" (literally "true Sama" or "real Sama"), to distinguish themselves from the land-dwelling Sama-Bajau subgroups. A recent study shows that the Sama-Dilaut people of the Philippines have Indian or South Asian ancestry.

Other minor Sama-Bajau groups named after islands of origin include the Sama Bannaran, Sama Davao, Sama Zamboanga Sikubung, Sama Tuaran, Sama Semporna, Sama Sulawesi, Sama Simunul, Sama Tabawan, Sama Tandubas (or Sama Tando' Bas), and Sama Ungus Matata. Mixed-heritage Sama-Bajau and Tausūg communities are sometimes known as "Bajau Suluk" in Malaysia. People of multiple ethnic parentage may further identify with a three-part self-description, such as "Bajau Suluk Dusun". The following are the major subgroups usually recognised as distinct:

- Bajo (Indonesia) – Also known as "Same'" (or simply "Sama") by the Bugis; and "Turijene" or "Taurije'n" (literally "people of the water"), "Bayo", or "Bayao" by the Makassar. They are Sama-Bajau groups who settled in Sulawesi and Kalimantan, Indonesia through the Makassar Strait from as early as the 16th century. They have spread further into nearby islands, including the Lesser Sunda Islands, Maluku Islands, and Raja Ampat Islands.

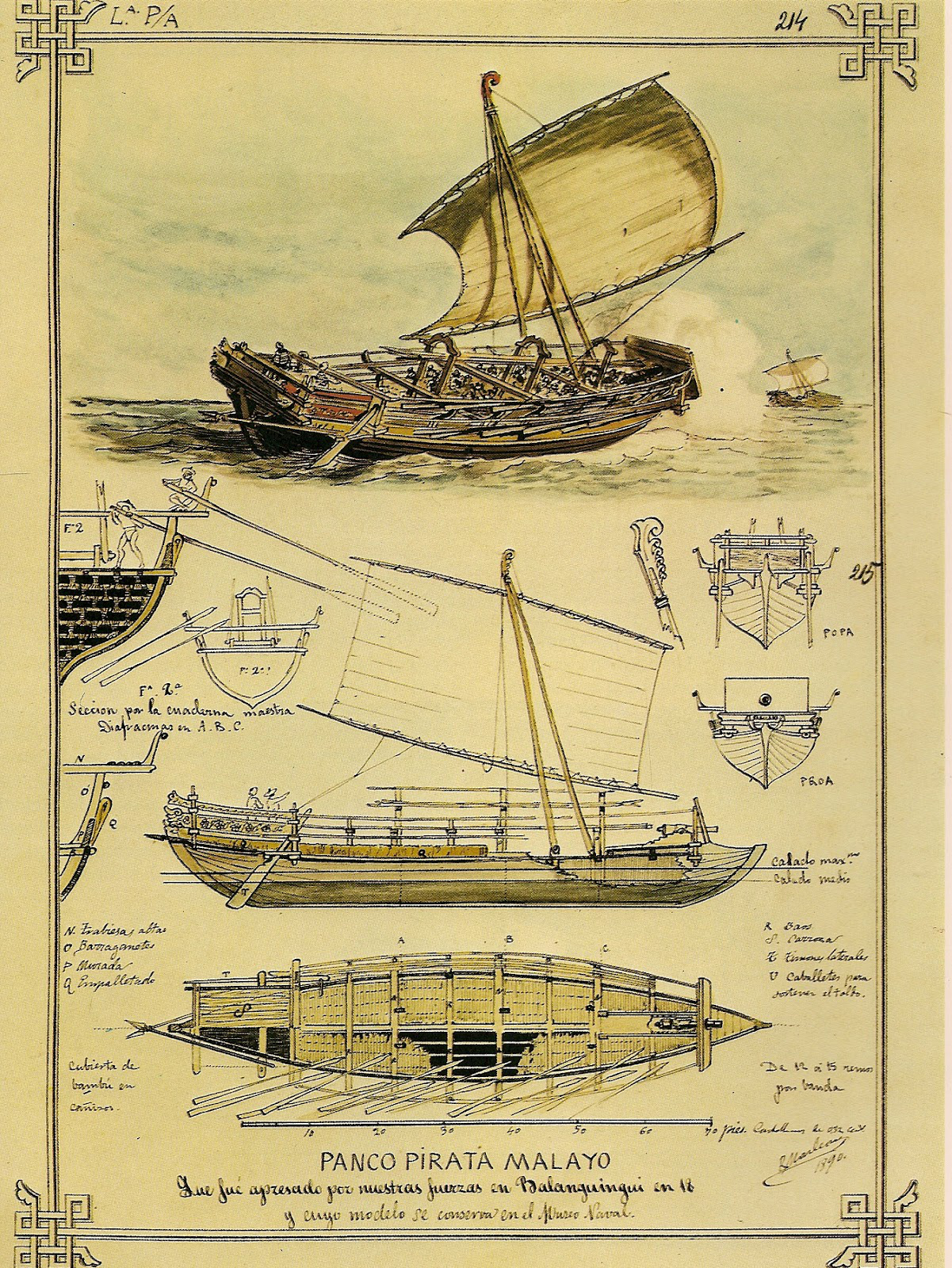
Garay warship of the Banguingui pirates

- Banguingui or Balangingi (Philippines, Malaysia) – Also known as "Sama Balangingi", "Sama Balanguingui", or "Sama Bangingi". Native to the Philippines. Some have recently migrated to Sabah. They are sometimes considered distinct from other Sama-Bajau. They have a more martial-oriented society and were once part of regular sea raids and piracy against coastal communities and passing ships.

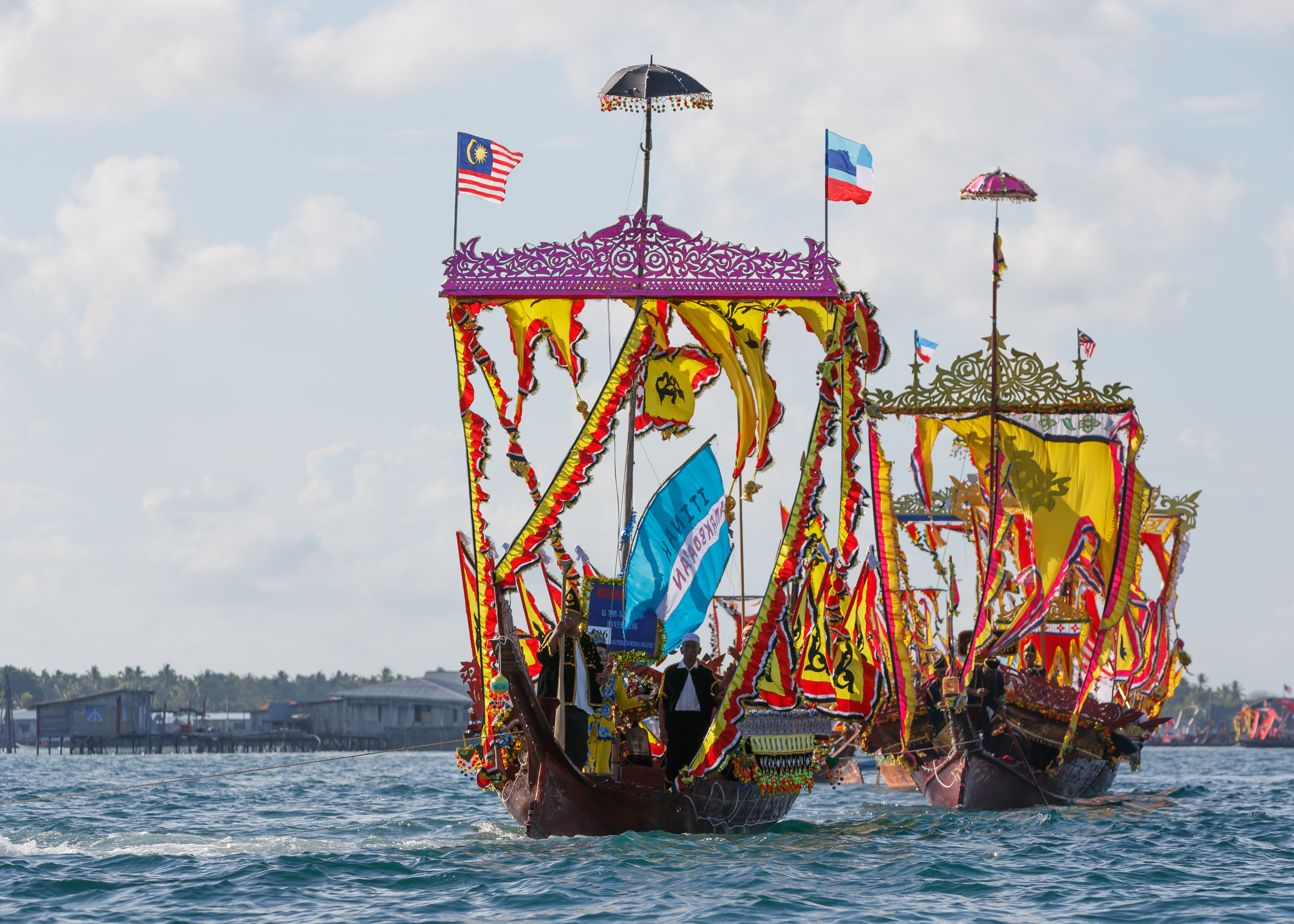
The Regatta Lepa festival in Semporna, Sabah, Malaysia. Lepa refers to the houseboat in the dialect of East Coast Bajau. In this festival, Bajau people decorate their boats with colourful flags.

- East Coast Bajau (Philippines, Malaysia) – Term used to classify various Sama-Bajau group that live in north and east coast of Sabah. Many from this subgroup are considered native of Sabah but unlike the West Coast Bajau, the East Coast Bajau have a closer cultural and historical ties with the Sama-Bajau in the Philippines (with their descendants making up a good number of population of this subgroup in the form of Moro refugee, legal migrants, illegal immigrants and naturalized citizens especially after 1972). This subgroup can be split into two group, the fully sedentary "Bajau Daratan Pinggir Pantai" or "Bajau Darat" (seashore Bajau or land Bajau) and the semi-nomadic "Bajau Laut" (sea Bajau). The first group tend to differentiate themselves from the second group which is the Bajau Laut (who are called with the pejorative term, "Pala'u") and they are made up of different Bajau sub-ethnic like Bajau Kubang, Bajau Ubian, Bajau Simunul, Bajau Sengkuang, etc. The second group still identify themselves as Bajau Laut or Sama Dilaut and while some have retained their original boat-dwelling lifestyle, many have built their homes on land. The seashore Bajau like the Bajau Kubang build houseboats like Lepa to be sold to the Bajau Laut who will then use it as their own home. The East Coast Bajau are known for the colourful annual Regatta Lepa festival, which occurs from 24 to 26 April.
- Samal (Philippines, Malaysia) – "Samal" (also spelled "Siamal" or "Siyamal") is a Tausūg and Cebuano term and is sometimes considered offensive. Their preferred endonym is simply "Sama", and they are more accurately a general subgroup of Sama Dea ("land Sama") native to the Philippines. A large number are now residing around the coasts of northern Sabah, though many have also migrated north to the Visayas and southern Luzon. They are predominantly land-dwelling. They are the largest single group of Sama-Bajau. In Davao del Norte, the Island Garden City of Samal was possibly named after them.
- Ubian or Obian (Philippines, Malaysia) – Originated from the island of South Ubian in Tawi-Tawi, Philippines. They reside in sizeable minorities living around the towns of Kudat (being the majority in Banggi Island), Semporna, Kota Kinabalu (in Gaya Island) and Kota Belud (in area like Kampung Baru-Baru and Kuala Abai) in Sabah, Malaysia. In Sabah, they are part of the East Coast Bajau subgroup and can be further divided into two group based on their migration wave. The first group is the Ubian who arrived at Sabah prior to World War II (with one of the earliest documented account being in 1888) and their descendants has since acculturated with local culture of Sabah (including the culture of West Coast Bajau). Based on the constitution, they are recognised as native of Sabah due to them being born in Sabah during the colonial era. The second group is the Ubian that arrive from Southern Philippines as asylum seekers starting from 1972 due to the Moro Conflict and this group are considered as illegal immigrants and foreigners to the citizen of Sabah. However, many of them have since obtain Malaysian Identification Card (IC) which possibly link to the Project IC controversy in Sabah. Despite this, the descendants of the second group that had obtained IC has start to acculturate with local Malaysian and Sabahan lifestyle and consider themselves as citizen of the country.

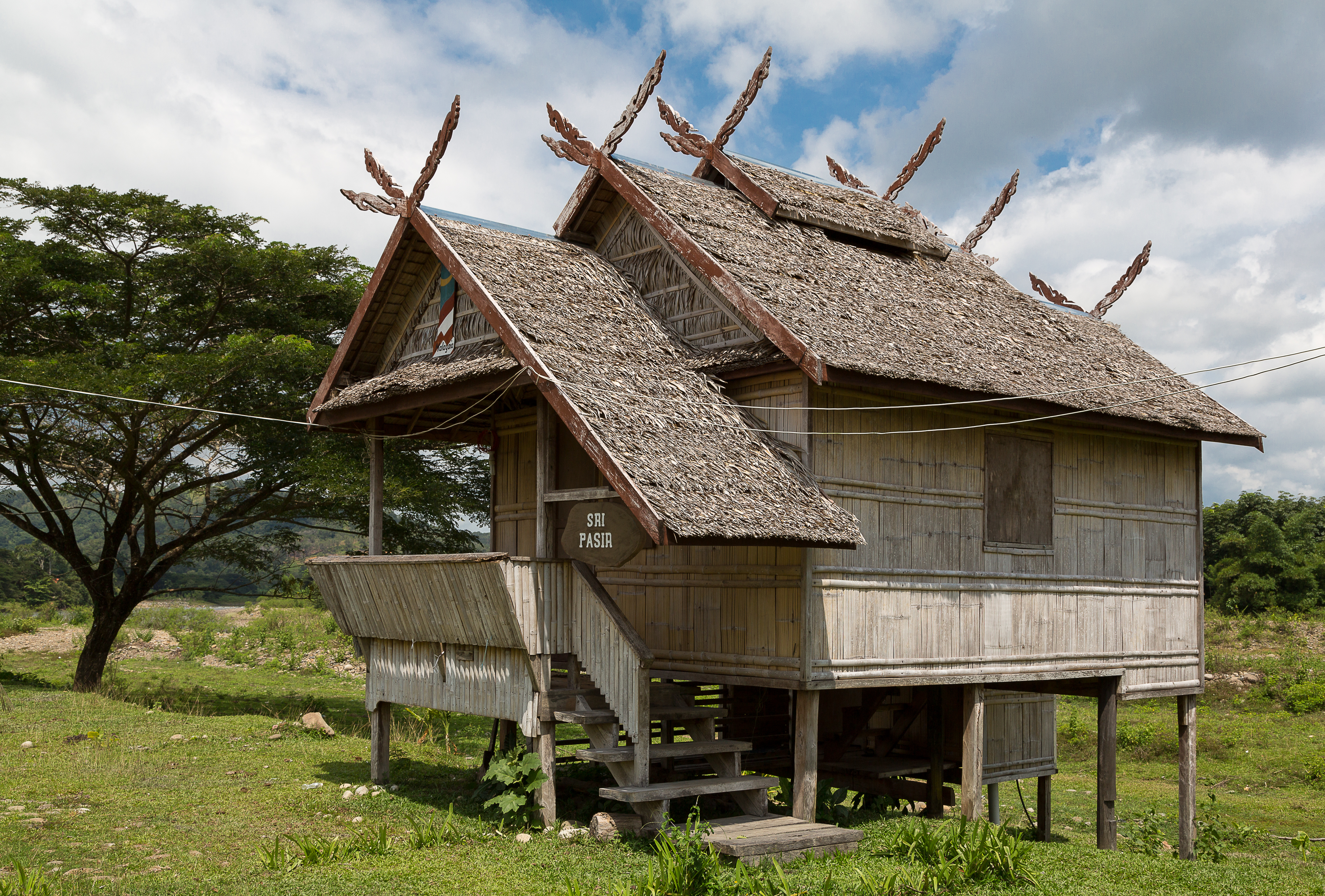
The traditional house of the west coast Bajau in Kota Belud, Sabah, Malaysia

- West Coast Bajau (Malaysia) – Also known as "Sama Kota Belud". Native to the western coast of Sabah, particularly around Kota Belud District. They prefer to call themselves by the general ethnonym "Sama", not "Bajau"; and their neighbours, the Dusuns also call them "Sama". British administrators originally defined them as "Bajau". They are referred to as West Coast Bajau in Malaysia to distinguish them from the Sama Dilaut of eastern Sabah and the Sulu Archipelago. They are known for having a traditional horse culture.

The following are subgroups that do not self-identify as Sama, although they are culturally related to the Sama people and speak a Sama-Bajaw language:

- Abaknon (Philippines) – a subgroup from Capul, Northern Samar in the Visayas Islands that speak the Abaknon language. They were colonised and converted to Christianity early by the Spanish and today are culturally Visayan. Their folk history claims that their ancestors originated from the southern Philippines (identified in some sources as the island of Balabac). According to their oral tradition, they refused to convert to Islam and submit to the rule of the Moro sultanates during the 1300s AD. Led by a datu named Abak, their people left the island, eventually reaching and settling the island now known as Capul.
- Jama Mapun (Philippines, Malaysia) – sometimes known by the exonyms "Sama Mapun", "Sama Kagayan", "Bajau Kagayan", or just "Kagayan". They are from the island of Mapun, Tawi-Tawi (formerly known as Cagayan de Sulu) and some of them have settled in Sabah (in area like Banggi Island and Sandakan). Their culture is heavily influenced by the Sulu Sultanate. They are relatively isolated and do not usually consider themselves as Sama.
- Yakan (Philippines) – Found in the mountainous interior of the island of Basilan. Though they may have been the ancestors of the Sama-Bajau, they have become linguistically and culturally distinct and are usually regarded as a separate ethnic group. They are exclusively land-based and are usually farmers. Yakan are also a horse-riding culture, similar to the West Coast Bajau. They are renowned for their weaving traditions. They resisted Tausug rule during the early formation of the Sulu Sultanate, eventually gaining recognition as a separate political entity. They are only partially Islamized, with a significant minority retaining indigenous anito beliefs or practising Folk Islam.

== Languages ==
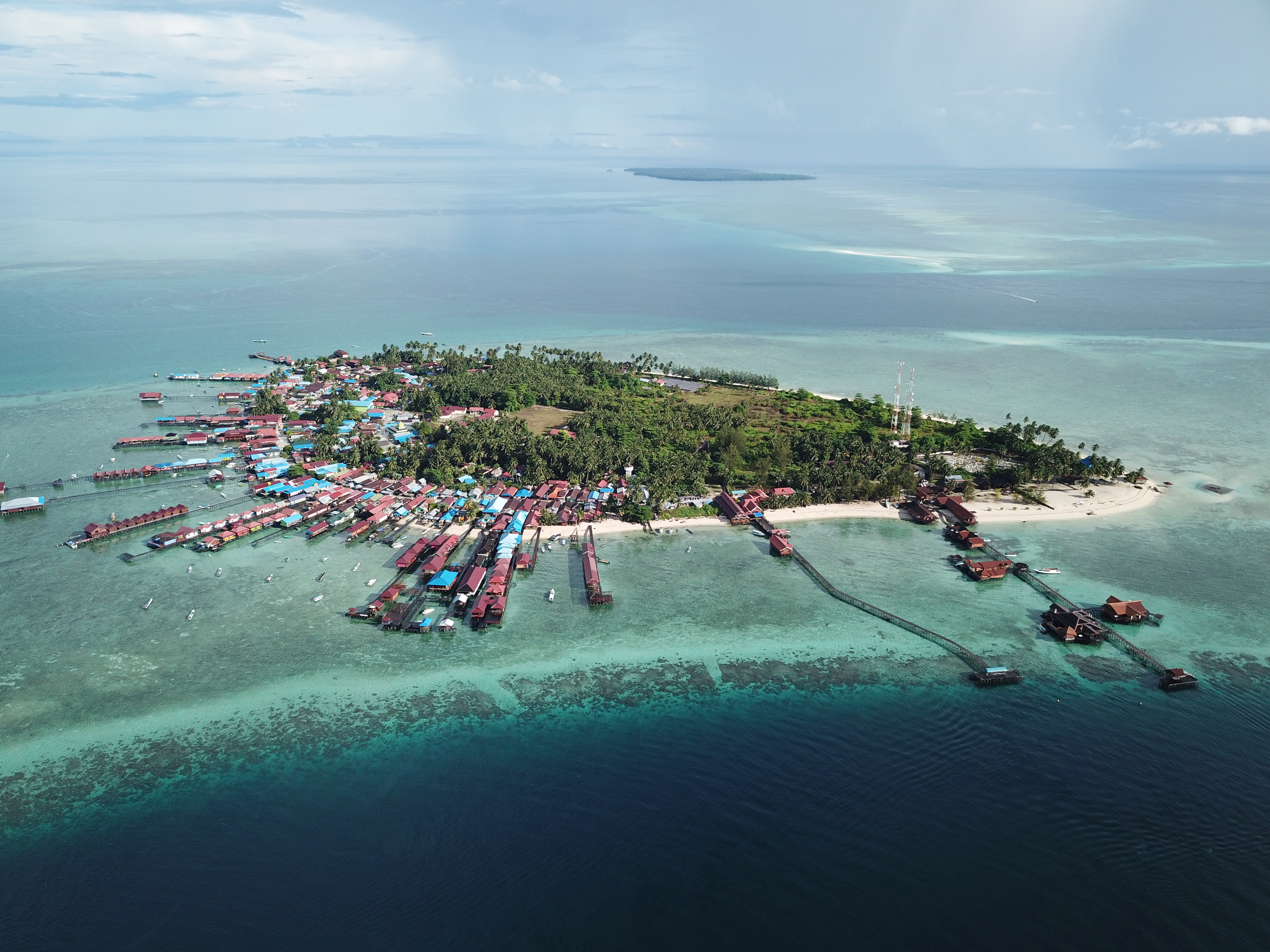
Derawan Island, one of the major Bajau settlements off the coast of Berau, East Kalimantan, Indonesia

The Sama–Bajau peoples speak some ten languages of the Sama–Bajau subgroup of the Western Malayo-Polynesian language family. Sinama is the most common name for these languages, but they are also called Bajau, especially in Malaysia. Most Sama-Bajau can speak multiple languages.

The Sama-Bajau languages were once classified under the Central Philippine languages of the Malayo-Polynesian geographic group of the Austronesian language family. But due to marked differences with neighbouring languages, they were moved to a separate branch altogether from all other Philippine languages. For example, Sinama pronunciation is quite distinct from other nearby Central Philippine languages like Tausūg and Tagalog. Instead of the primary stress being usually on the final syllable; the primary stress occurs on the second-to-the-last syllable of the word in Sinama. This placement of the primary stress is similar to Manobo and other languages of the predominantly animistic ethnic groups of Mindanao, the Lumad peoples.

In 2006, the linguist Robert Blust proposed that the Sama-Bajaw languages derived from the Barito lexical region, though not from any established group. It is thus a sister group to other Barito languages like Dayak and Malagasy. It is classified under the Bornean geographic group.

Sama-Bajau languages are usually written in the Jawi alphabet.

== Culture ==
=== Religion ===
Religions of Sama-Bajau (Malaysian population only)
Religion	Percent
Islam	95.26%
Christianity	0.52%
Folk religion / Other religions	0.08%
No religion / Unknown	4.14%

Religion can vary among the Sama-Bajau subgroups; from strict adherence to Sunni Islam, forms of folk Islam (itself influenced by Sufi traditions of early Muslim missionaries), to animistic beliefs in spirits and ancestor worship. There is a small minority of Catholics and Protestants in the Bajau diaspora, particularly from Davao del Sur in the Philippines.

Among the modern coastal Sama-Bajau of Malaysia, claims to religious piety and learning are an important source of individual prestige. Some of the Sama-Bajau lack mosques and must rely on the shore-based communities such as those of the more Islamised or Malay peoples. Some of the more nomadic Sama-Bajau, like the Ubian Bajau, are much less adherent to orthodox Islam or even unreligious. They practice a syncretic form of folk Islam, revering local sea spirits, known in Islamic terminology as Jinn.

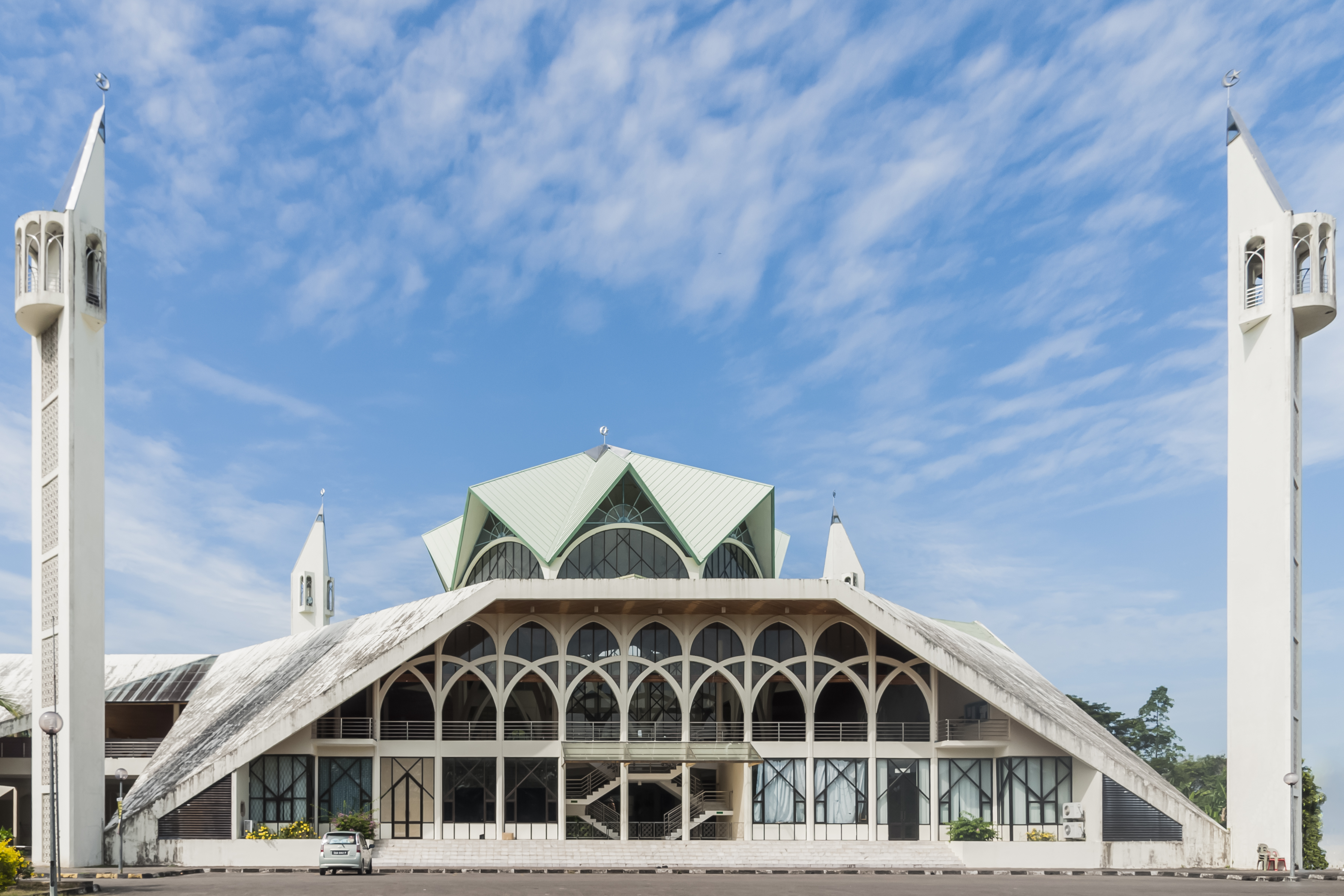
An-Nur Mosque, the main mosque in the Bajau village of Tuaran, Sabah, Malaysia

The ancient Sama-Bajau were animistic, and this is retained wholly or partially in some Sama-Bajau groups. The supreme deities in Sama-Bajau mythology are Umboh Tuhan (also known as Umboh Dilaut, the "Lord of the Sea") and his consort, Dayang Dayang Mangilai ("Lady of the Forest"). Umboh Tuhan is regarded as the creator deity who made humans equal to animals and plants. Like other animistic religions, they fundamentally divide the world into the physical and spiritual realms which coexist. In modern Muslim Sama-Bajau, Umboh Tuhan (or simply Tuhan or Tuan) is usually equated with Allah. (Note: Tuhan (literally "god" or "master") is a common word referring to a supreme deity in various Austronesian languages in eastern Malaysia, southwestern Philippines, and eastern Indonesia. It originally referred to a different concept of a deity separate from the Abrahamic god, but Malays and other Muslim Austronesian ethnic groups usually equate Tuhan with Allah. Compare with Bathala of the Tagalogs and Kan-Laon of the Visayans.)

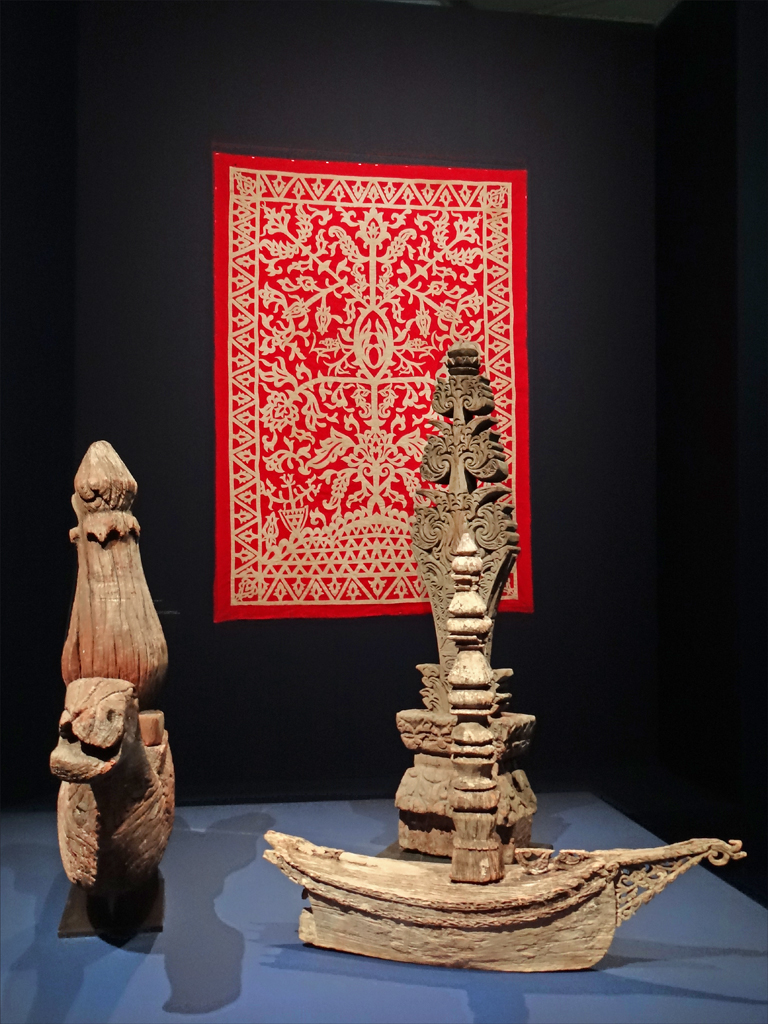
Sunduk grave markers showing the Sama okil carving traditions. These originated from the pre-Islamic ancestor worship of the Sama-Bajau and originally included human and animal figures, which are largely missing in modern sunduk, due to Islamic influence.

Other objects of reverence are spirits known as umboh ("ancestor", also variously spelled omboh, m'boh, mbo', etc.). Traditionally, the umboh referred more specifically to ancestral spirits, different from the saitan (nature spirits) and the jinn (familiar spirits); some literature refers to all of them as umboh. These include Umboh Baliyu (the spirits of wind and storms), and Umboh Payi or Umboh Gandum (the spirits of the first rice harvest). They include totemic spirits of animals and plants, including Umboh Summut (totem of ants) and Umboh Kamun (totem of mantis shrimp).

The construction and launch of sailing vessels are ritualised, and the vessels are believed to have a spirit known as Sumangâ ("guardian", literally "one who deflects attacks"). The umboh are believed to influence fishing activities, rewarding the Sama-Bajau by granting good luck favours known as padalleang and occasionally punishing by causing serious incidents called busong.

Traditional Sama-Bajau communities may have shamans (dukun) traditionally known as the kalamat. The kalamat are known in Muslim Sama-Bajau as the wali jinn (literally "custodian of jinn") and may adhere to taboos concerning the treatment of the sea and other cultural aspects. The kalamat presides over Sama-Bajau community events along with mediums known as igal jinn. The kalamat and the igal jinn are said to be "spirit-bearers" and are believed to be hosts of familiar spirits. It is not, however, regarded as a spirit possession, since the igal jinn never lose control of their bodies. Instead, the igal jinn are believed to have acquired their familiar spirit (jinn) after surviving a serious or near-fatal illness. For the rest of their lives, the igal jinn is believed to share their bodies with the particular jinn who saved them.

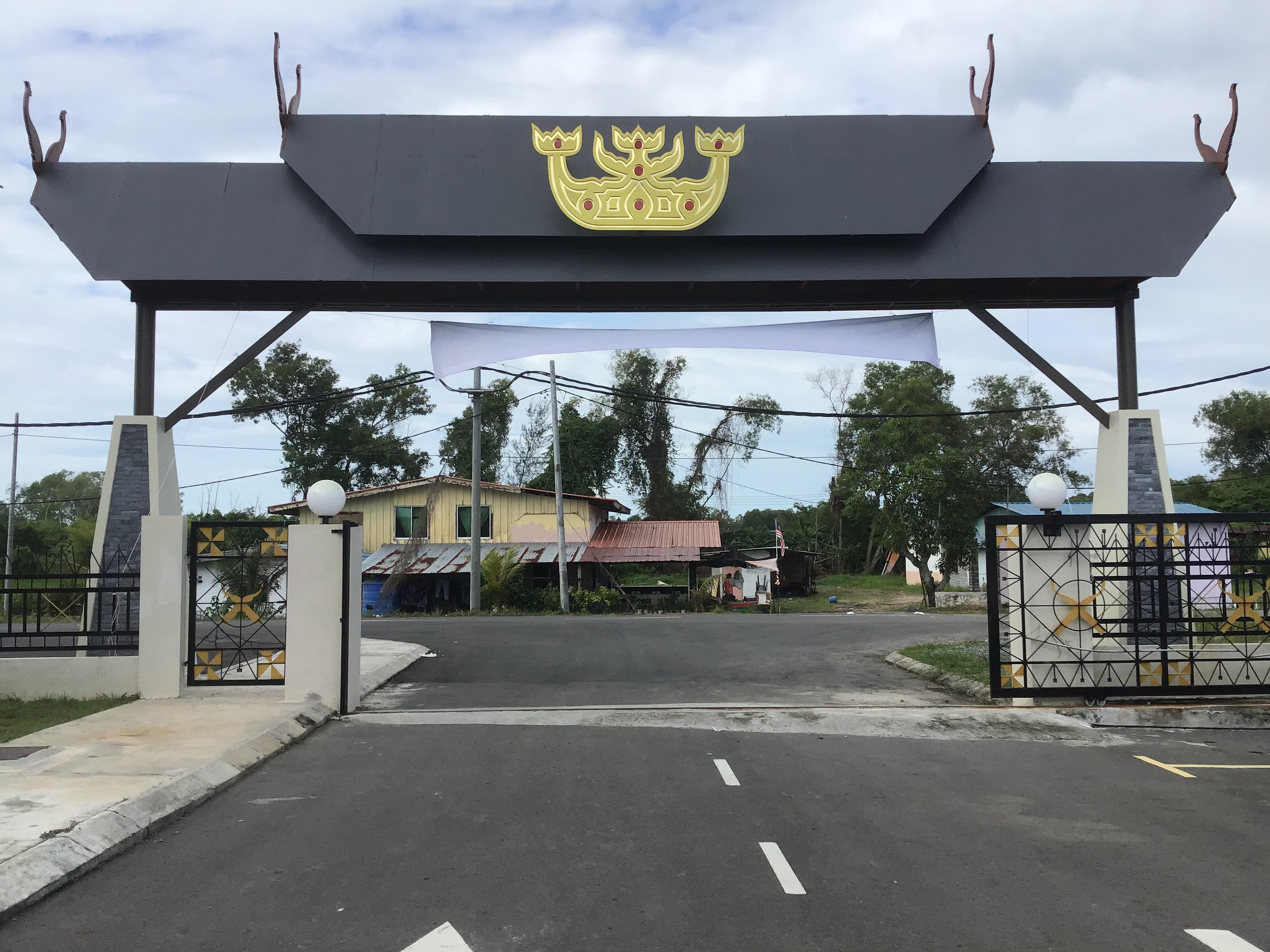
Gate of the Bajau Sama Cultural Centre in Tuaran District of Sabah, Malaysia

One important religious event among the Sama-Bajau is the annual feast known as pag-umboh or magpaay-bahaw, an offering of thanks to Umboh Tuhan. In this ceremony, newly harvested rice (paay-bahaw) are dehusked (magtaparahu) while Islamic prayers (duaa) are recited. They are dried (magpatanak) and are then laid out in small conical piles symbolic of mountains (bud) on the living room floor (a process known as the "sleeping of rice"). After two or three nights, two-thirds are set aside for making sweet rice meals (panyalam), while one-third is set aside for making sweet rice cakes (durul). Additional prayers (zikir), which includes calling the names of ancestors out loud, are offered to the Umboh after the rice meals have been prepared. Pag-umboh is a solemn and formal affair.

Another annual religious ceremony among the boat-dwelling Sama Dilaut is the pagkanduli (literally "festive gathering"). It involves ritual dancing to Umboh Tuhan, Dayang Dayang Mangilai, and ancestral ghosts called bansa. The ritual is first celebrated under a sacred dangkan tree (strangler figs, known elsewhere in the Philippines as balete) symbolising the male spirit Umboh Tuhan and afterwards in the centre of a grove of kama'toolang trees (pandan trees) symbolising the female spirit Dayang Dayang Mangilai.

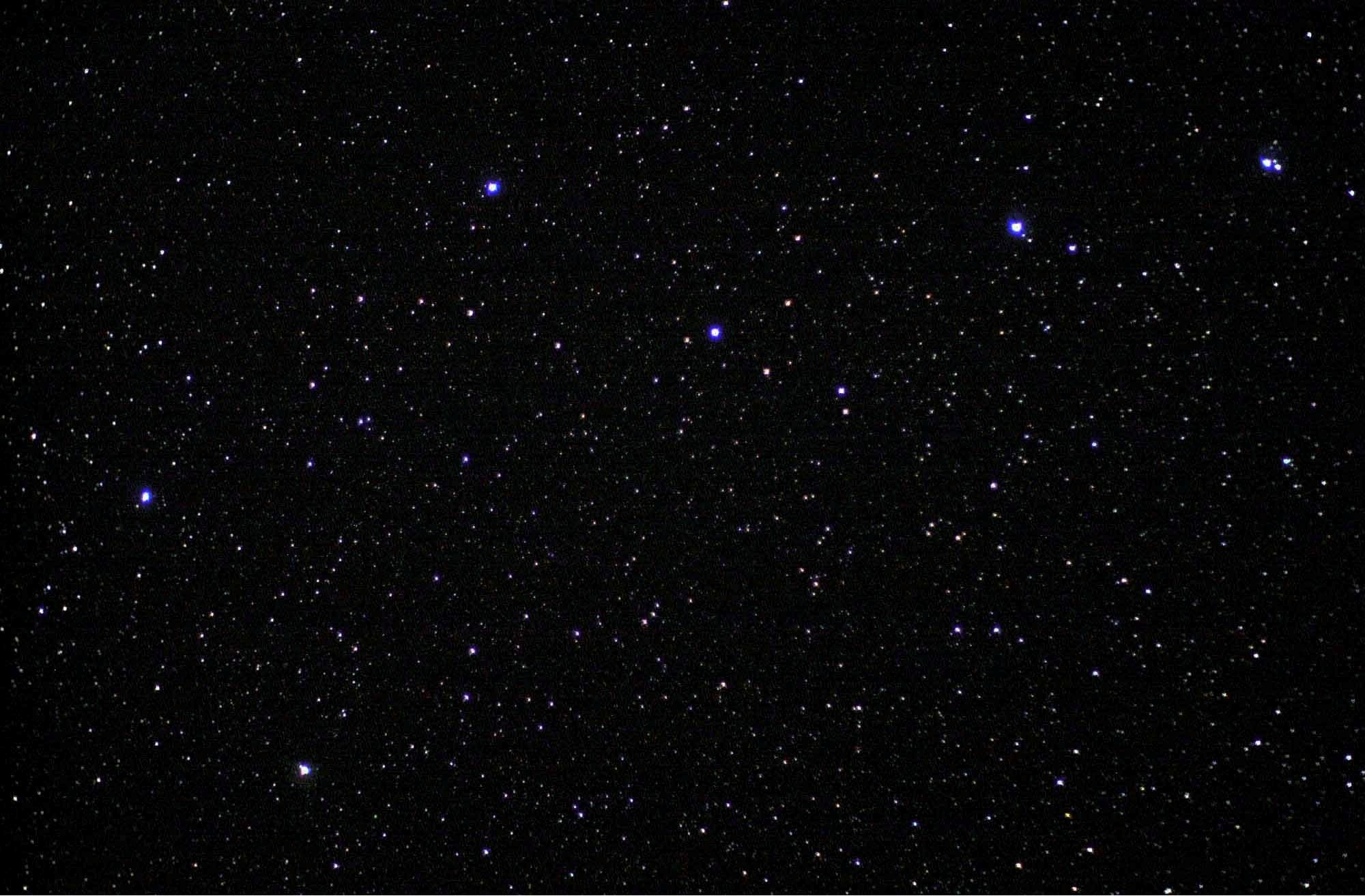
The Jama Mapun people's indigenous cosmology is extremely vast. Examples of figures in their cosmology are Niyu-niyu (coconut palm), Lumba-lumba (dolphin), and Anak Datu (two sons of a datu spearing another figure, Bunta – a blowfish).

The trance dancing is called mag-igal and involves female and male and igal jinn, called the jinn denda and jinn lella respectively. The jinn denda perform the first dance known as igal limbayan under the dangkan tree, with the eldest leading. They are performed with intricate movements of the hands, usually with metal fingernail extensions called sulingkengkeng. If the dance and music are pleasing, the bansa are believed to take possession of the dancers, whereupon the wali jinn will assist in releasing them at the end of the dance.

The bansa are not feared as they are regarded as spirits of ancestors. Temporarily serving as hosts for the bansa while dancing to music is regarded as a "gift" by the living Sama Dilaut to their ancestors. After the igal limbayan, the wali jinn will invite the audience to participate, to celebrate, and to give their thanks. The last dance is the igal lellang, with four jinn lella performing a warrior dance, whereupon the participants will proceed to the kama'toolang grove. There they will perform rituals and dance (this time with male and female dancers together), symbolically "inviting" Dayang Dayang Mangilai to come with them back to the dangkan tree. Further games and celebrations are held under the original dangkan tree before the celebrants say their farewells to the spirits. Unlike pag-umboh, pagkanduli is a joyous celebration, involving singing, dancing, and joking among all participants. It is the largest festive event among the Sama Dilaut communities.

Aside from pagkanduli and magpaay-bahaw, public dances called magigal jinn may occur. During these celebrations, the igal jinn may be consulted for a public séance and nightly trance dancing. In times of epidemics, the igal jinn is called upon to remove illness-causing spirits from the community. They do this by setting a "spirit boat" adrift in the open sea beyond the village or anchorage.

=== Boat dwelling ===
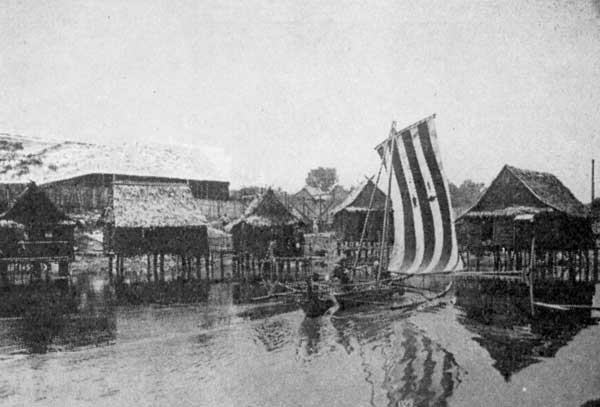
A Sama-Bajau vinta in Zamboanga City, 1923

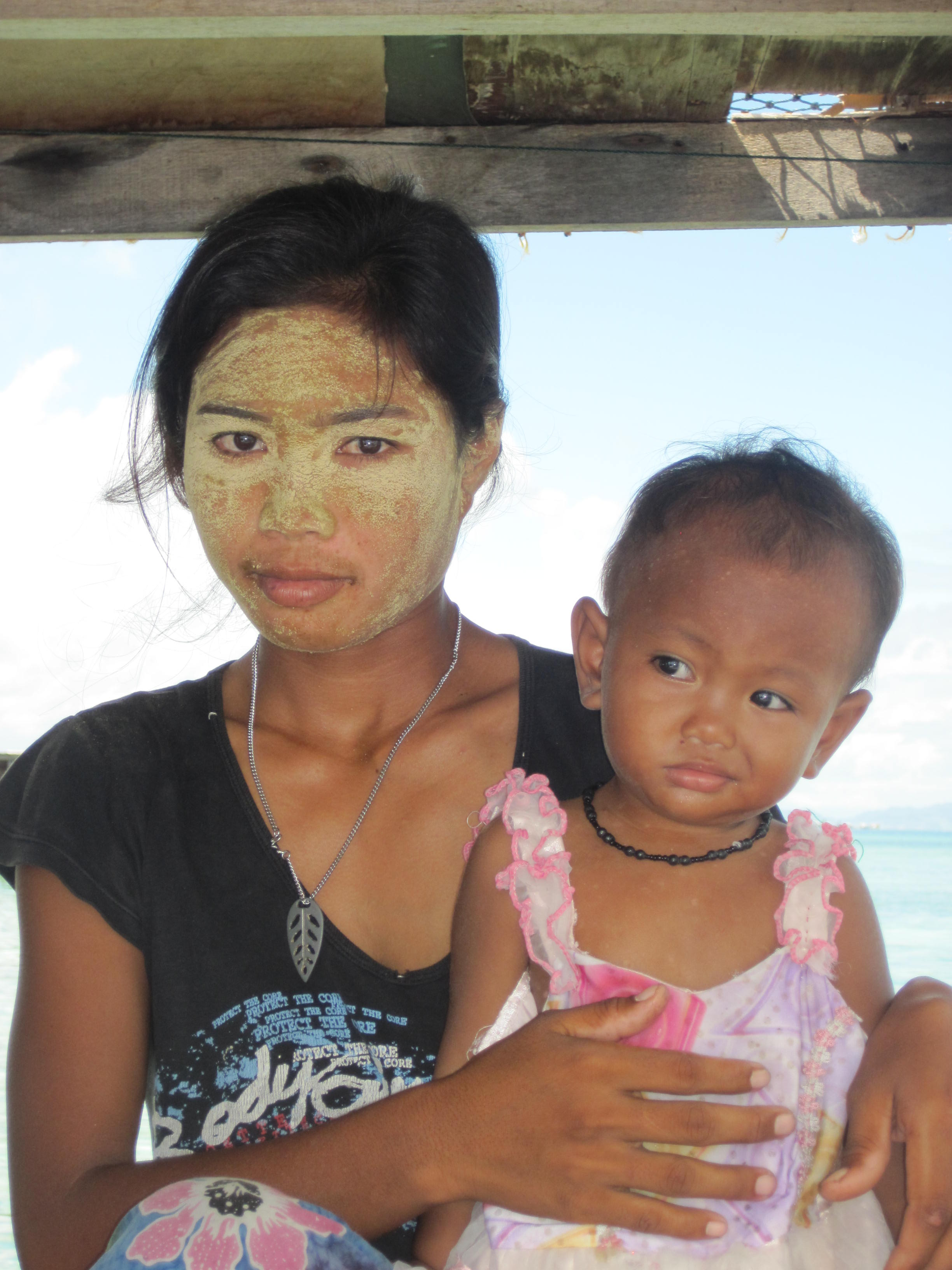
Sama-Bajau woman from Maiga Island, Semporna, Sabah, Malaysia, with traditional sun protection called burak

A few Sama-Bajau still live traditionally. They live in houseboats (lepa, balutu, and vinta being the most common types) which generally accommodate a single nuclear family (usually five people). The houseboats travel together in flotillas with houseboats of immediate relatives (a family alliance) and co-operate during fishing expeditions and in ceremonies. A married couple may choose to sail with the relatives of the husband or the wife. They anchor at common mooring points (called sambuangan) with other flotillas (usually also belonging to extended relatives) at certain times of the year.

These mooring points are usually presided over by an elder or headsman. The mooring points are close to sources of water or culturally significant locations like island cemeteries. There are periodic gatherings of Sama-Bajau clans usually for various ceremonies like weddings or festivals. They generally do not sail more than 40 km (24.85 mi) from their "home" moorage. They periodically trade goods with the land-based communities of other Sama-Bajau and other ethnic groups. Sama-Bajau groups may routinely cross the borders of the Philippines, Malaysia, and Indonesia for fishing, trading, or visiting relatives.

Sama-Bajau women also use a traditional sun-protecting powder called burak or borak, made from water weeds, rice, and spices.

=== Music, dance, and arts ===
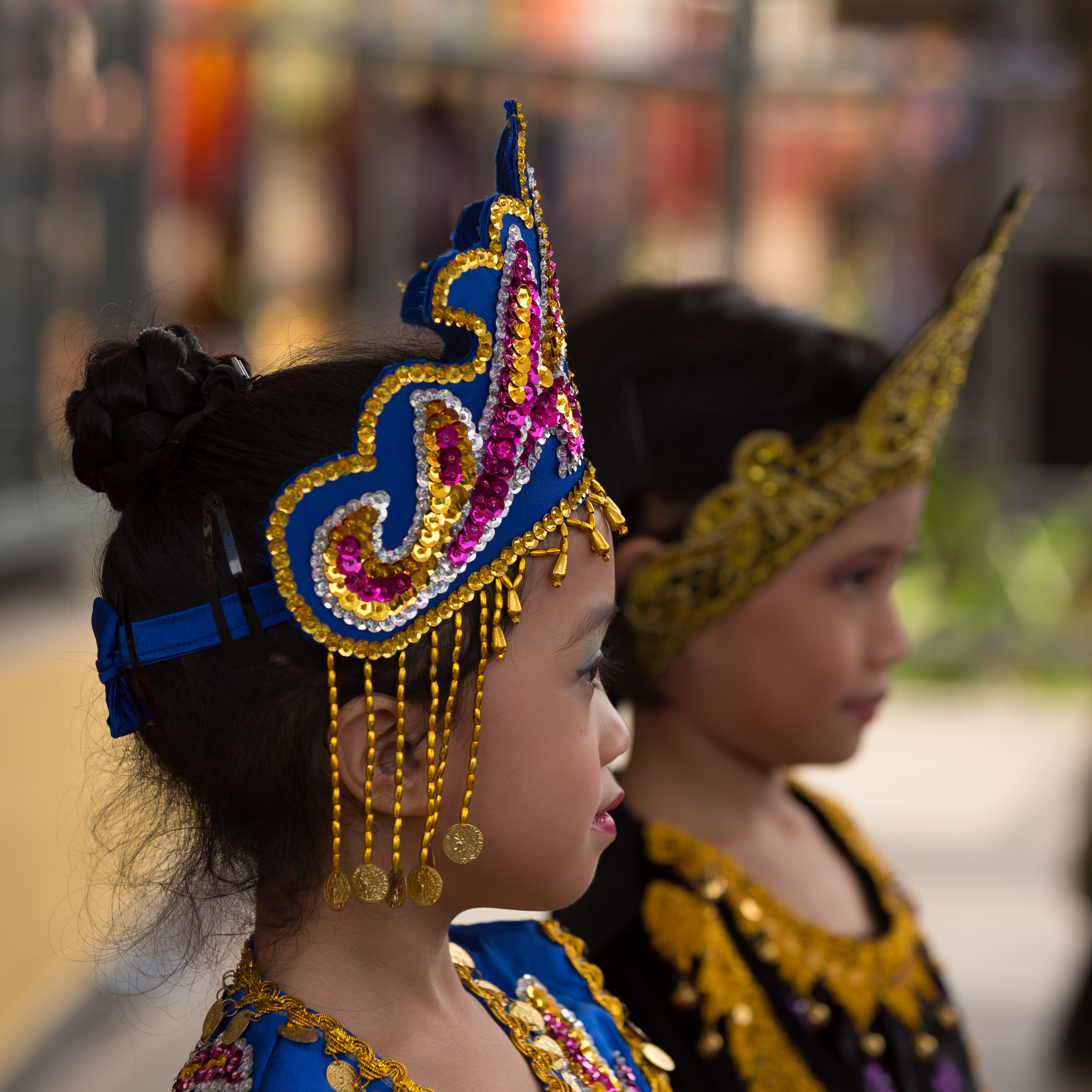
A Bajau girl clad in her traditional dress

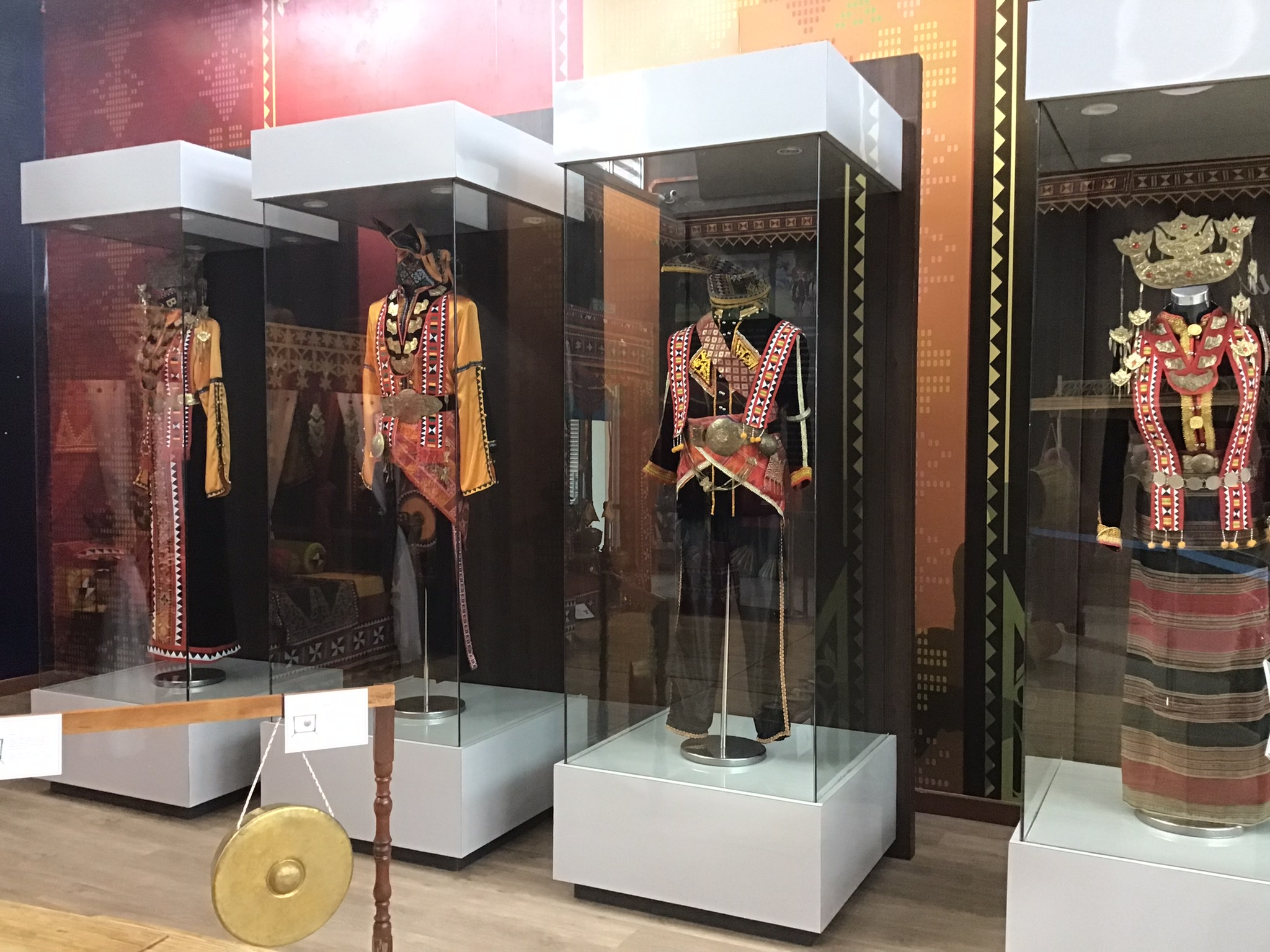
Traditional attire of the West Coast Bajau of Sabah

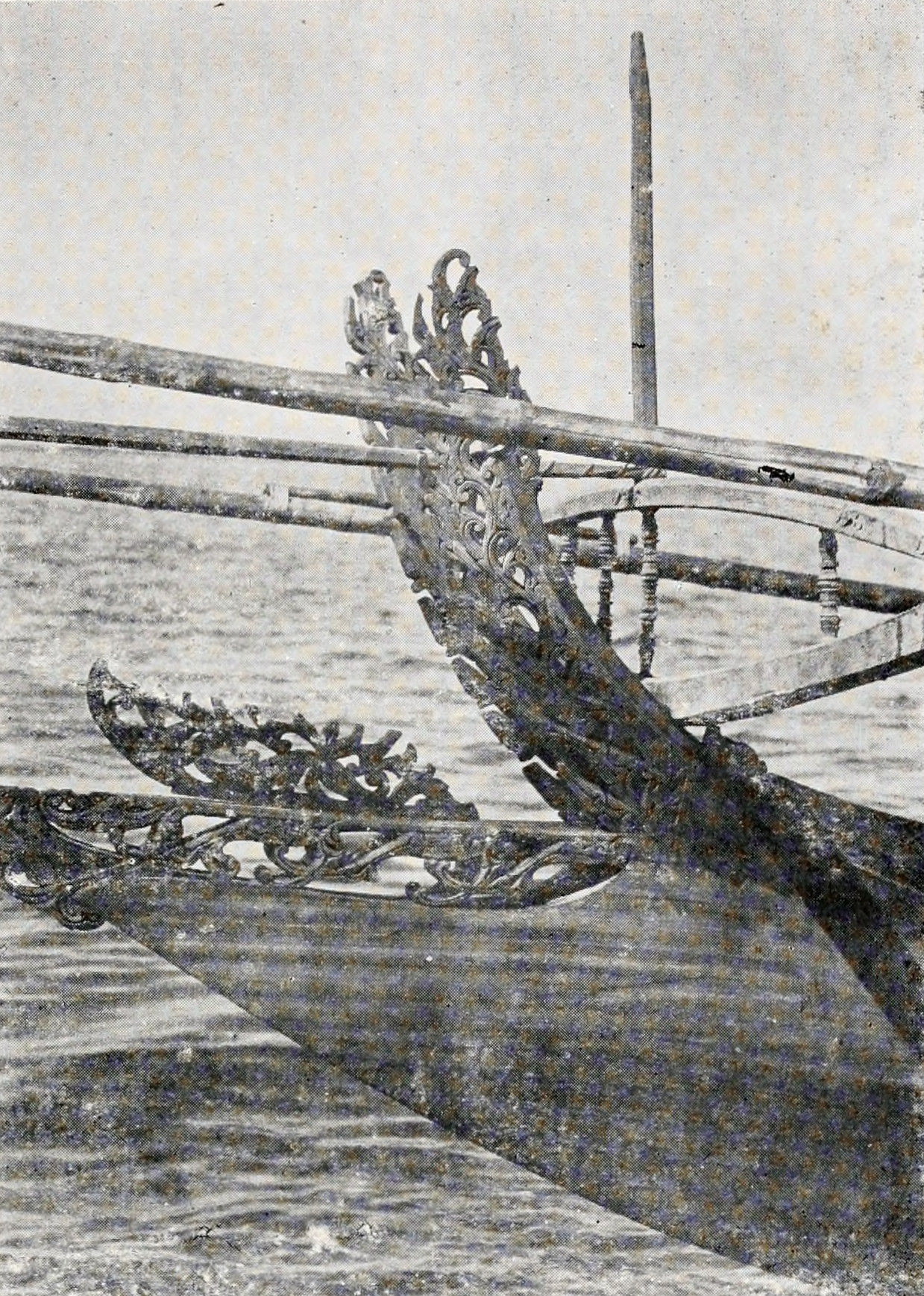
Detail of the elaborate okil carvings on the stern of a vinta from Tawi-Tawi, c. 1920

Sama-Bajau traditional songs are handed down orally through generations. The songs are usually sung during marriage celebrations (kanduli pagkawin), accompanied by dance (pang-igal) and musical instruments like pulau (flute), gabbang (xylophone), tagunggo' (kulintang gongs), biula (violin), and in modern times, electronic keyboards. There are several types of Sama-Bajau traditional songs, they include: isun-isun, runsai, najat, syair, nasid, bua-bua anak, and tinggayun.

Among the more specific examples of Sama-Bajau songs are three love songs collectively referred to as Sangbayan. These are Dalling Dalling, Duldang Duldang, and Pakiring Pakiring. The most well-known of these three is Pakiring Pakiring (literally "moving the hips"), which is more familiar to the Tausūg in its commercialised and modernised form Dayang Dayang. The Tausūg claim that the song is native to their culture, and whether the song is originally Tausūg or Sama-Bajau remain controversial. Most Sama-Bajau folk songs are becoming extinct, largely due to the waning interest of the younger generations. Sama-Bajau people are also well known for weaving, needlework skills, and their association with tagonggo music.

In visual arts, Sama-Bajau have an ancient tradition of carving and sculpting known as okil (also okil-okil or ukkil). These were used to decorate houseboats and animistic ritual objects. They were used most prominently for Sama grave markers which are found in the ancient traditional burial grounds of the Sama people in some (usually uninhabited) islands of Sulu and Tawi-Tawi. These include some of the oldest examples of okil, which are usually carved from coral and limestone. Wooden carved grave markers are common later on, usually made from or carved from the boat belonging to the deceased. These are usually carved into human figures that represent the deceased. These graves are often decorated with buntings and food offerings, reflecting the ancient ancestor worship (anito) traditions of the Sama. Okil later inspired the very similar okir traditions of the Maranao people.

=== Horse culture ===
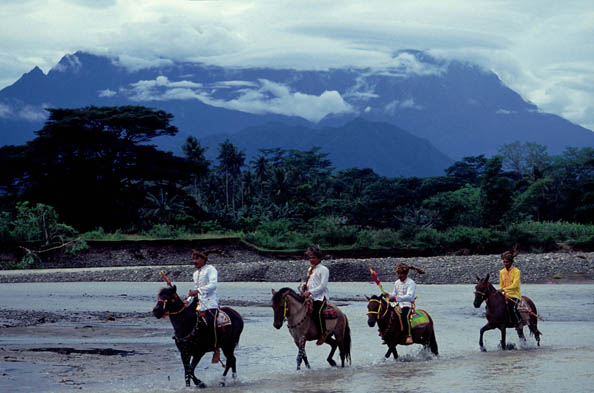
The West Coast Bajau horsemen in their hometown of Kota Belud, with a background of Mount Kinabalu

The more settled land-based West Coast Bajau are expert equestrians – which makes them remarkable in Malaysia, where horse riding has never been widespread anywhere else. The traditional costume of Sama-Bajau horsemen consists of a black or white long-sleeved shirt (badu sampit) with gold buttons (betawi) on the front and decorated with silver floral designs (intiras), black or white trousers (seluar sampit) with gold lace trimmings, and a headpiece (podong). They carry a spear (bujak), a riding crop (pasut), and a silver-hilted keris dagger. The horse is also caparisoned with a colourful outfit called kain kuda that also have brass bells (seriau) attached. The saddle (sila sila) is made from water buffalo hide and padded with cloth (lapik) underneath.

=== Society ===
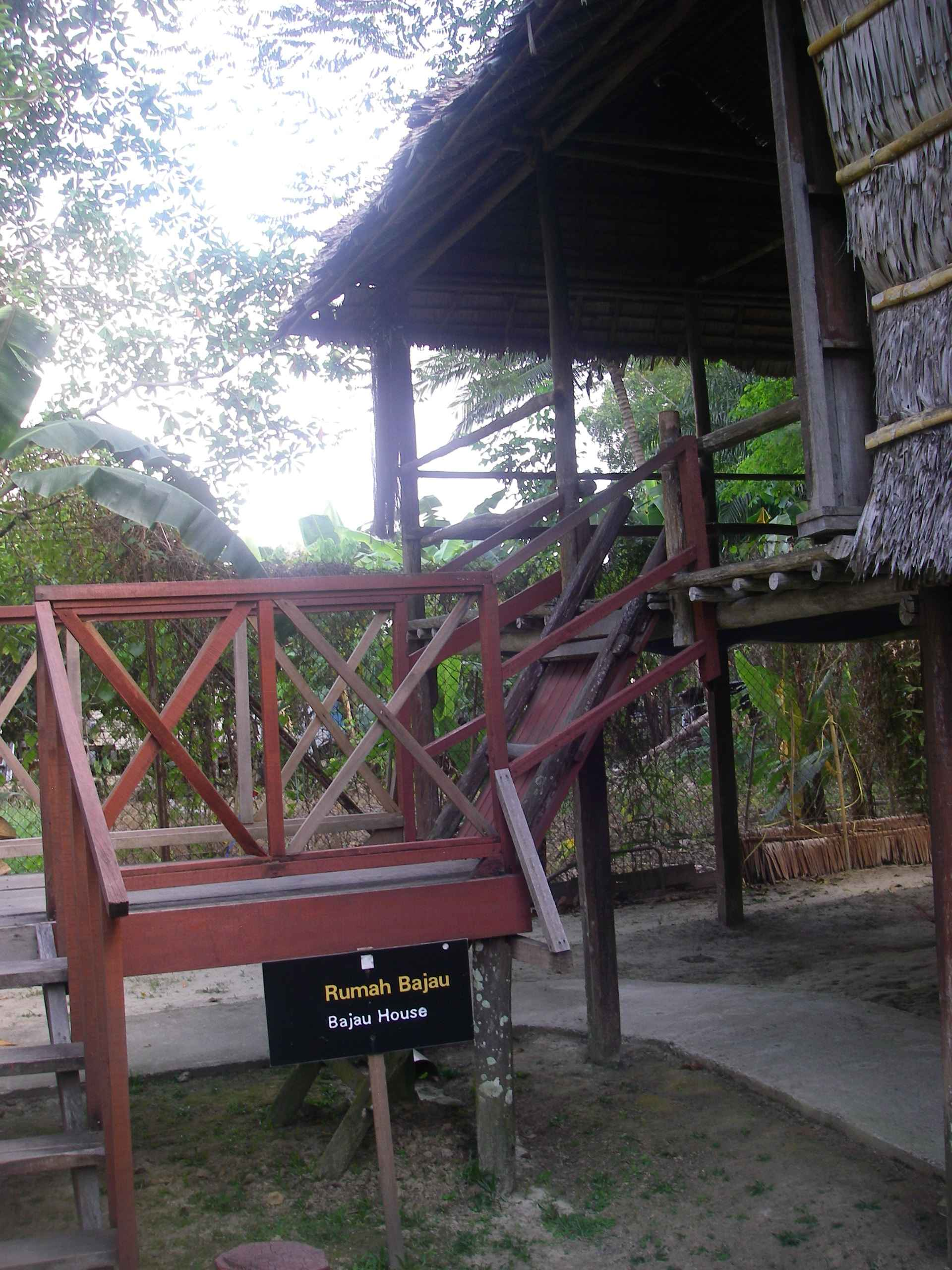
The rehabilitation of a traditional Sama-Bajau house in the Heritage Village of Kota Kinabalu, Sabah, Malaysia

Though some Sama-Bajau headsmen have been given honorific titles like "Datu", "Maharaja" or "Panglima" by governments (like under the Sultanate of Brunei), they usually only had little authority over the Sama-Bajau community. Sama-Bajau society is traditionally highly individualistic, and the largest political unit is the clan cluster around mooring points, rarely more. Sama-Bajau society is also more or less egalitarian, and they did not practice a caste system, unlike most neighbouring ethnic groups. The individualism is probably due to the generally fragile nature of their relationships with land-based peoples for access to essentials like wood or water. When the relationship sours or if there is too much pressure from land-based rulers, the Sama-Bajau prefer to simply move on elsewhere. Greater importance is placed on kinship and reciprocal labour rather than formal authority for maintaining social cohesion.

There are a few exceptions, however, like the Jama Mapun and the Sama Pangutaran of the Philippines, who follow the traditional pre-Hispanic Philippine feudal society with a caste system consisting of nobles, notables, and commoners and serfs. Likely introduced by the Sultanate of Sulu. Other exceptions include the West Coast Bajau of Kota Belud district in Sabah where their intermarriages with the Iranun (who practiced the Kedatuan system) has given some of their descendants the title of Datu and even develop a similar Kedatuan system. This group that possessed Datu title are referred to as jomo kedatuan (Kedatuan group or people). The Bajau (and Iranun) of Kota Belud also follow bloodline class system which divided to 4 classes, orang lima belas (15 people) for Kedatuan, orang sepuluh (10 people), orang tujuh (7 people), and hamba for slaves. However in the modern day context, the hamba class was elevated to orang tujuh since slave group no longer exist. Since many Bajau leader there was born from Kedatuan group, this give them some rights to make decisions and action which are recognised by other classes to a certain degree especially in traditional custom practices.

== Biological characteristics ==
=== Free-diving adaptations ===
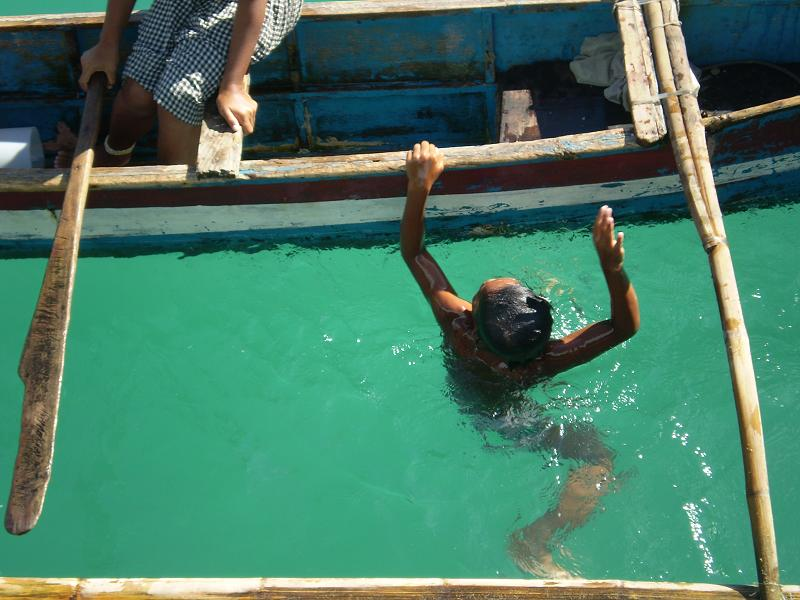
A Sama-Bajau child in Tagbilaran City, Bohol, Philippines, diving for coins thrown by tourists into the water

Sama-Bajau are noted for their exceptional abilities in free-diving. Divers work long days with the "greatest daily apnea diving time reported in humans" of greater than 5 hours per day submerged. Some Bajau intentionally rupture their eardrums at an early age to facilitate diving and hunting at sea. Many older Sama-Bajau are therefore hard of hearing.

More than a thousand years of subsistence freediving associated with their life on the sea appear to have endowed the Bajau with several genetic adaptations to facilitate their lifestyle. A 2018 study showed that Bajau spleens are about 50 percent larger than those of a neighbouring land-based group, the Saluan, letting them store more haemoglobin-rich blood, which is expelled into the bloodstream when the spleen contracts at depth, allowing breath-holding dives of longer duration. This difference is apparently related to a variant of the PDE10A gene. Other genes that appear to have been under selection in the Bajau include BDKRB2, which is related to peripheral vasoconstriction, involved in the diving response; FAM178B, a regulator of carbonic anhydrase, which is related to maintaining blood pH when carbon dioxide accumulates; and another one involved in the response to hypoxia. These adaptations were found to likely result from natural selection, leading to a uniquely increased frequency of the relevant alleles within the sampled Bajau population relative to other referenced eastern Asian populations. Members of another group, the Moken, have been found to have better underwater vision than Europeans, although it is not known if this trait has a genetic basis.

== Depictions in popular culture ==
The 1982 to 1988 Sabah coat of arms depicts a kingfisher, adopted primarily to symbolise the large Sama-Bajau population in Sabah

It has been suggested by some researchers that the Sama-Bajau people's visits to Arnhem Land gave rise to the accounts of the mysterious Baijini people in the myths of Australia's Yolngu people.

In 2010, the newly discovered squidworm, Teuthidodrilus samae, was named after the Sama-Bajau people of Tawi-Tawi.

James Cameron cited the Sama-Bajau as one of the seafaring peoples that inspired the Metkayina, an oceanic Na'vi clan, in Avatar: The Way of Water (2022).

The Sama-Bajau have also been the subject of several films. They include:

- Badjao (1957) – A Filipino film directed by Lamberto V. Avellana
- Anak ng Badjao (1987) – A Filipino Film directed by Jose Antonio Alonzo and Jerry O. Tironazona
- Bajau Laut: Nomads of the Sea (2008) – A Singaporean TV documentary produced by Matthew Malpelli.
- The Mirror Never Lies (2011) Indonesian film directed by Kamila Andini
- Thy Womb (2012) – A Filipino drama film directed by Brillante Mendoza
- Bohe': Sons of the Waves (2013) – A Filipino short film produced by Nadjoua and Linda Bansil
- Sahaya (2019) – A Filipino TV series directed by Zig Dulay

== Notable Sama-Bajau ==
=== Politics ===
- Mat Salleh (Datu Muhammad Salleh) – Sabah warrior from Inanam, Kota Kinabalu, during the British administration of North Borneo.
- Tun Datu Mustapha (Tun Datu Mustapha bin Datu Harun) – The first Yang di-Pertua Negeri (governor) of Sabah and the third Chief Minister of Sabah from Kudat.
- Tun Said Keruak – The seventh Governor of Sabah and the fourth Chief Minister of Sabah from Kota Belud.
- Tun Sakaran Dandai – The eighth Governor of Sabah and also the eighth Chief Minister of Sabah from Semporna.
- Ahmadshah Abdullah – The ninth Governor of Sabah from Inanam, Kota Kinabalu.
- Salleh Said Keruak (Datuk Seri Panglima Mohd Salleh bin Tun Mohd Said Keruak) – The ninth Chief Minister of Sabah from Kota Belud and a former federal minister with the rank of Senator in the Dewan Negara.
- Osu Sukam (Tan Sri Datuk Seri Panglima Osu bin Sukam) – The twelfth Chief Minister of Sabah from Papar.
- Mohd Nasir Tun Sakaran (Dato' Mohd Nasir bin Tun Sakaran Dandai) – Sabah politician from Semporna.
- Shafie Apdal (Dato' Seri Hj Mohd Shafie Bin Apdal) – The fifteenth Chief Minister of Sabah from Semporna.
- Pandikar Amin Mulia – Speaker of the Dewan Rakyat, former Member of Parliament of Malaysia from Kota Belud.
- Askalani Abdul Rahim (Datuk Askalani Bin Abdul Rahim) – Former Minister of Culture, Youth and Sports from Semporna.
- Abdul Rahman Dahlan – Former Cabinet Minister from Tuaran as well the former Member of Parliament in the Dewan Rakyat for the constituency of Kota Belud from 2008 to 2018.
- Isnaraissah Munirah Majilis – Member of Parliament of Kota Belud in the Dewan Rakyat (also half Kadazan-Dusun ancestry on paternal side).
- Manis Muka Mohd Darah – Former Member of Sabah State Legislative Assembly for Bugaya.
- Sultan Ombra Amilbangsa - From Simunul, in what is now the province of Tawi-Tawi. He was a member of the National Assembly of the Philippines from 1935 to 1938, and from 1943 to 1944, and the Philippines House of Representatives from 1945 to 1949, and from 1951 to 1961. In 1961, he filed House Bill No. 5682, for the granting of independence to the Province of Sulu as a sovereign nation due to what he felt was the negligence of the central government over the concerns of his province. He married Dayang-Dayang Hadji Piandao Kiram, niece and adopted daughter of Sultan Jamalul Kiram II. He succeeded as Sulu Sultan from 1936 to 1964.

=== Arts and entertainment ===
- Haja Amina Appi — Filipino master mat weaver and teacher from Ungos Matata, Tandubas, Tawi-Tawi; recipient of the Philippine National Living Treasures Award.
- Adam (singer) AF2 (Aizam Mat Saman) – Malaysian singer and actor, great-nephew of Tun Ahmadshah Abdullah (his grandmother is the elder sister of the latter) from Inanam, Kota Kinabalu.
- Sitti – Filipino bossa nova singer.
- Zizi Kirana – Malaysian rapper from Semporna.
- Siti Surianie Julkarim (the late Siti Surianie Julkarim) – Malaysian singer who gained fame through the reality show known as Mentor on TV3 from Likas, Kota Kinabalu.
- Atu Zero – Malaysian comedian and actor from Kudat.
- Azwan Kombos – Malaysian actor from Kota Belud.
- Rita Gaviola – Filipino actress in the Pinoy Big Brother Season 7.

=== Sports ===
- Bana Sailani – A Filipino Olympic swimmer who represented the Philippines in the 1956 Summer Olympics, the 1958 Asian Games (where he won 5 bronze medals, and 1 silver), and the 1960 Summer Olympics. He was more popularly known as Bapa' Banana.
- Estino Taniyu – A Malaysian swimmer from the Royal Malaysian Navy who swam across the English Channel in 13 hours, 45 minutes, and 45 seconds on 21 September 2012.
- Matlan Marjan – Former Malaysian football player and the former Sabah FA captain from Kota Belud.
- Eldio "Imam" Gulisan – A Filipino freediver who set the Philippines national record at the Japanese Cup 2019 on 7 September 2019. Featured in Episode 3 of the Netflix series Home Game.
- Zainizam Marjan – Former Malaysian football player, younger brother of Matlan from Kota Belud.

== See also ==
- Lumad
- Gaya Island
- Orang Laut
- Sama–Bajaw languages
- Sea Gypsies, a disambiguation page
- Physiology of Freediving

== Video ==
- Short BBC documentary on the Bajau
