= Swima =

Scientific classification
- Kingdom: Animalia
- Phylum: Annelida
- Clade: Pleistoannelida
- Clade: Sedentaria
- Order: Terebellida
- Family: Acrocirridae
- Genus: Swima; Osborn, Haddock, Pleijel, Madin & Rouse, 2009

Genus of annelids

Swima is a genus of marine polychaete worms found in the ocean at depths between 1,800 and 3,700 meters (5,900 and 12,100 feet). Even if they are agile swimmers, they are often seen hanging immobile in the water column as they are neutrally buoyant. This deep ocean pelagic (free-swimming) genus has modified bioluminescent gills that can be cast off from an individual. These discarded gills somewhat resemble green "bombs" that remain illuminated for several seconds after they have been discarded. It is thought that this is a defensive mechanism rather than reproductive, as it is seen in both mature and juvenile individuals. And because they are eyeless, communicating with light would be difficult. Swima worms are closely related to the recently discovered genus Teuthidodrilus, another pelagic cirratuliform of the bathyal zone.

== Discovery ==
The first specimens of the genus Swima were discovered in the deep trenches of Monterey Bay, off the coast of California.

== Taxonomy ==
There are currently three species recognised within the Swima:

- S. bombiviridis Osborn, Haddock, Pleijel, Madin & Rouse, 2009 (Green Bomber Worm or Bombardier Worm), Monterey Bay, California (type species)
- Swima fulgida Osborn, Haddock & Rouse, 2011 (Shining Bomber)
- Swima tawitawiensis Osborn, Haddock & Rouse, 2011 (Tawi-Tawi Bomber)

== Anatomy and physiology ==
Animals of the Swima are characterized by a thick gelatinous sheath, transparent body, simple nuchal organs, a single medial subulate branchia, and four pair of small segmental branchiae modified as elliptical, bioluminescent sacs.

== Etymology ==
The genus name, Swima, is derived from the Latin, referring to the animal's ability to swim.
