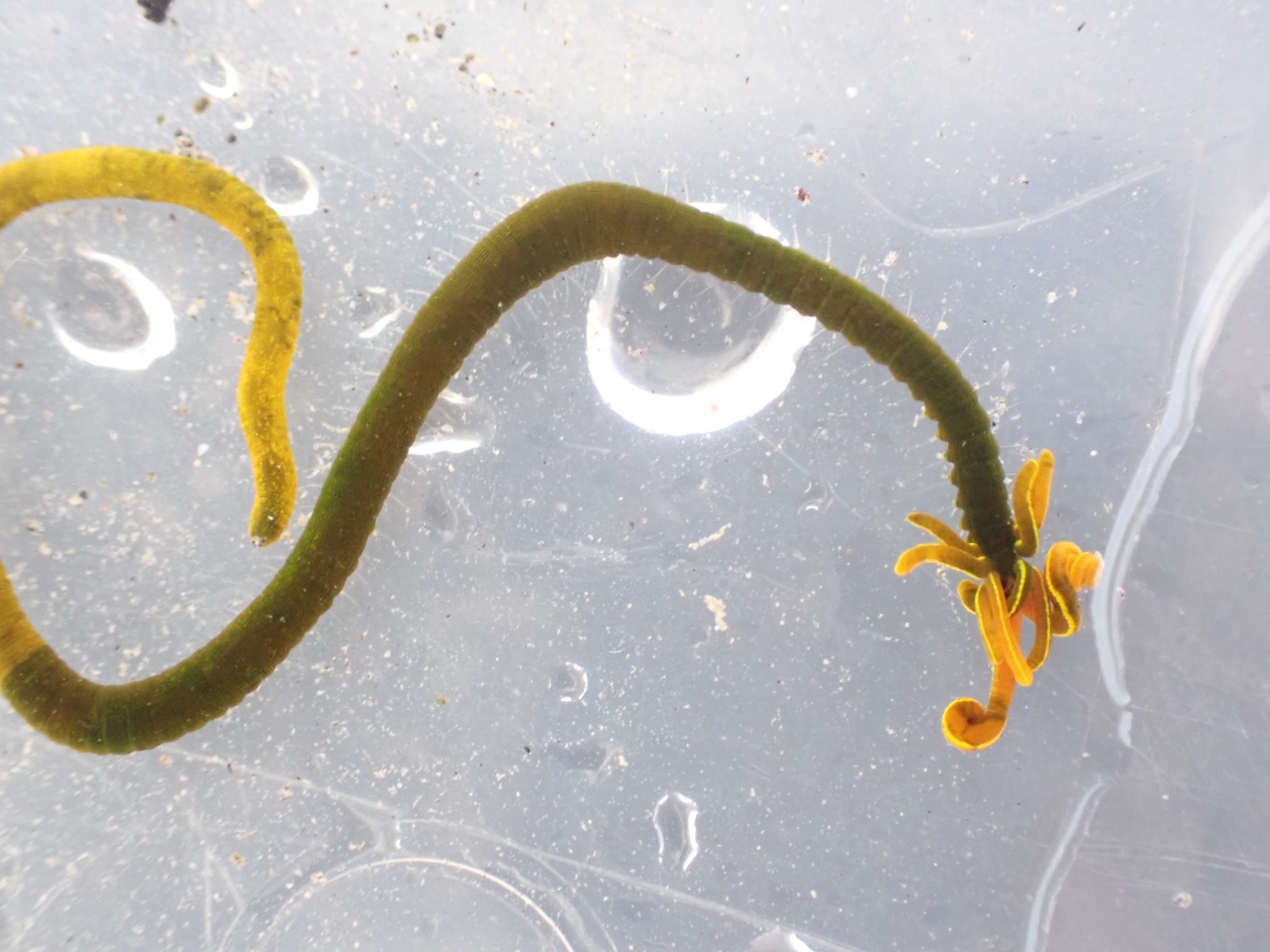
- Acrocirrus trisectus

Scientific classification
- Kingdom: Animalia
- Phylum: Annelida
- Clade: Pleistoannelida
- Clade: Sedentaria
- Order: Terebellida
- Suborder: Cirratuliformia
- Family: Acrocirridae; Banse, 1969

= Acrocirridae =

Family of annelids

Acrocirridae is a family of polychaete worms. Acrocirrids are detritivores (deposit feeders), catching falling particles with numerous long prostomial tentacles. There are eight known genera, and at least 21 described species and subspecies within the Acrocirridae. The acrocirrids are primarily benthic (seabed-dwelling) animals, but at least two genera (Swima and Teuthidodrilus) appear to have evolved or adapted to a pelagic (free-swimming) habitat.

== Systematics ==
Following is a list of genera and species within the family Acrocirridae:

- Genus Acrocirrus Grube, 1873
  - Acrocirrus aciculigerus Kudenov, 1976
  - Acrocirrus bansei Magalhães & Bailey-Brock, 2012
  - Acrocirrus columbianus Banse, 1979
  - Acrocirrus crassifilis Moore, 1923
  - Acrocirrus frontifilis (Grube, 1860)
  - Acrocirrus heterochaetus Annenkova, 1934
  - Acrocirrus incisa Kudenov, 1975
  - Acrocirrus muroranensis Okuda, 1934
  - Acrocirrus occipitalis Banse, 1979
  - Acrocirrus okotensis Imajima, 1963
  - Acrocirrus trisectus
    Acrocirrus trisectus Banse, 1969
  - Acrocirrus uchidai Okuda, 1934
  - Acrocirrus validus Marenzeller, 1879
- Genus Chauvinelia Laubier, 1974
  - Chauvinelia arctica Averincev, 1980
  - Chauvinelia biscayensis Laubier, 1974
- Genus Flabelligella Hartman, 1965
  - Flabelligella macrochaeta (Fauchald, 1972)
  - Flabelligella mexicana Fauchald, 1972
  - Flabelligella minuta Hartman, 1965
  - Flabelligella papillata Hartman, 1965
- Genus Flabelligena Gillet, 2001
  - Flabelligena amoureuxi Gillet, 2001
  - Flabelligena biscayensis (Kolmer, 1985)
  - Flabelligena cirrata (Hartman & Fauchald, 1971)
  - Flabelligena erratica (Orensanz, 1974)
  - Flabelligena gascognensis Aguirrezabalaga & Ceberio, 2006
  - Flabelligena mediterranea (Kolmer, 1985)
- Genus Helmetophorus Hartman, 1978
  - Helmetophorus rankini Hartman, 1978
- Genus Macrochaeta Grube, 1850
  - Macrochaeta australiensis Kudenov, 1976
  - Macrochaeta bansei Hartmann-Schröder, 1974
  - Macrochaeta clavicornis (M. Sars, 1835)
  - Macrochaeta helgolandica Friedrich, 1937
  - Macrochaeta leidyi (Verrill, 1882)
  - Macrochaeta multipapillata Westheide, 1981
  - Macrochaeta natalensis Hartmann-Schröder, 1996
  - Macrochaeta papillosa Ehlers, 1913
  - Macrochaeta pege Banse, 1969
  - Macrochaeta polyonyx Eliason, 1962
  - Macrochaeta sexoculata (Webster & Benedict, 1887)
  - Macrochaeta westheidei Santos & Silva, 1993
- Genus Swima Osborn, Haddock, Pleijel, Madin & Rouse, 2009
  - S. bombiviridis Osborn, Haddock, Pleijel, Madin & Rouse, 2009 (also known as Green Bomber Worm or Bombardier Worm), Monterey Bay, California
  - Swima fulgida Osborn, Haddock & Rouse, 2011
  - Swima tawitawiensis Osborn, Haddock & Rouse, 2011
- Genus Teuthidodrilus Osborn, Madin & Rouse, 2011
  - Teuthidodrilus samae Osborn, Madin & Rouse, 2011 (also known as Squidworm), Celebes Sea, East Indian Archipelago

== See also ==
- Eumetazoa
- Bilateria
- Protostomia
- Spiralia
- Lophotrochozoa
- Trochophore
