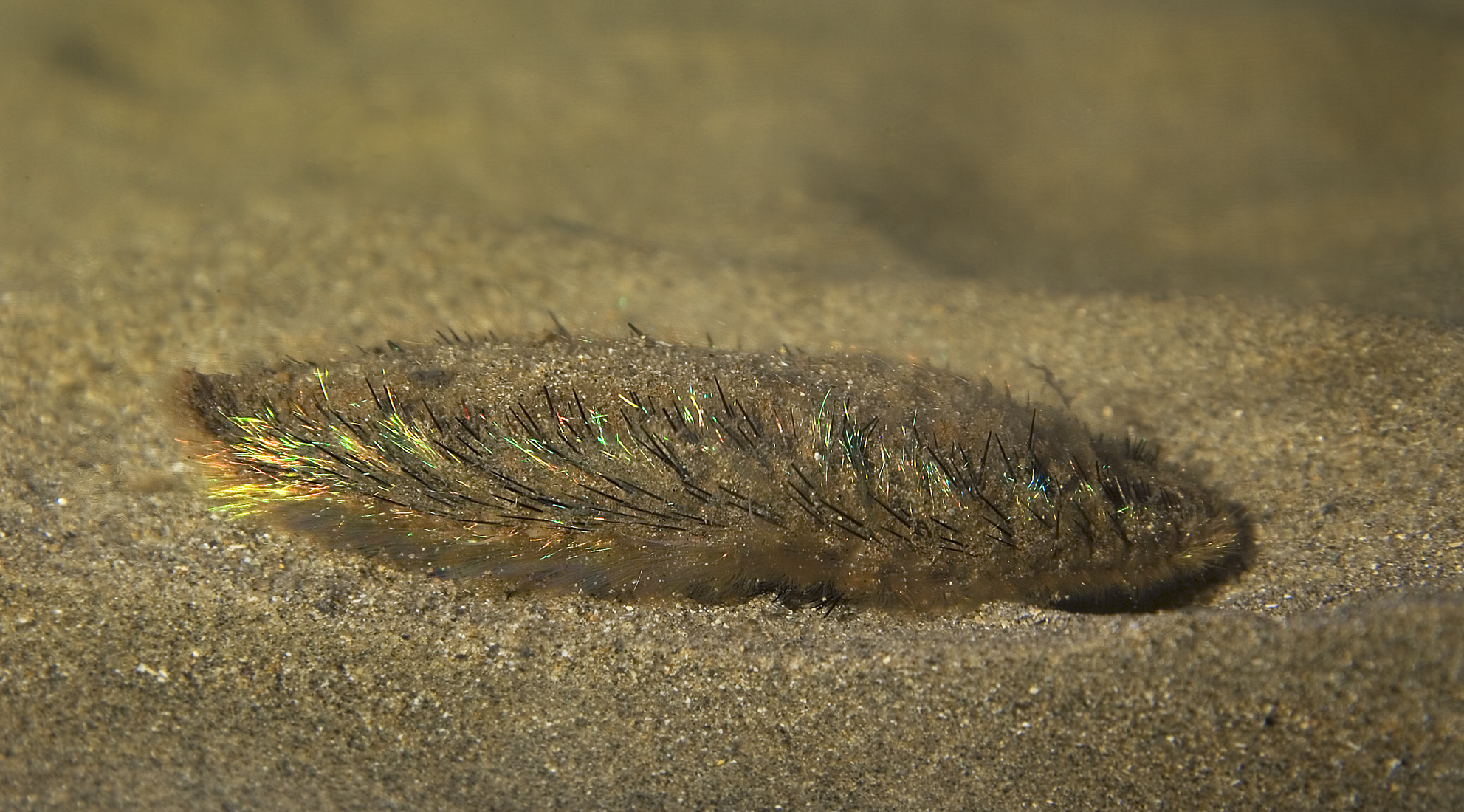
- Aphrodita aculeata

Scientific classification
- Kingdom: Animalia
- Phylum: Annelida
- Clade: Pleistoannelida
- Subclass: Errantia
- Order: Phyllodocida
- Suborder: Aphroditiformia
- Family: Aphroditidae
- Genus: Aphrodita; Linnaeus, 1758

Type species
- Aphrodita aculeata Linnaeus, 1758

Species
- See text

= Aphrodita =

Genus of marine worms

Aphrodita is a genus of marine polychaete worms found in the Mediterranean Sea and the Atlantic Ocean.

Several members of the genus are known as "sea mice".

== Etymology ==
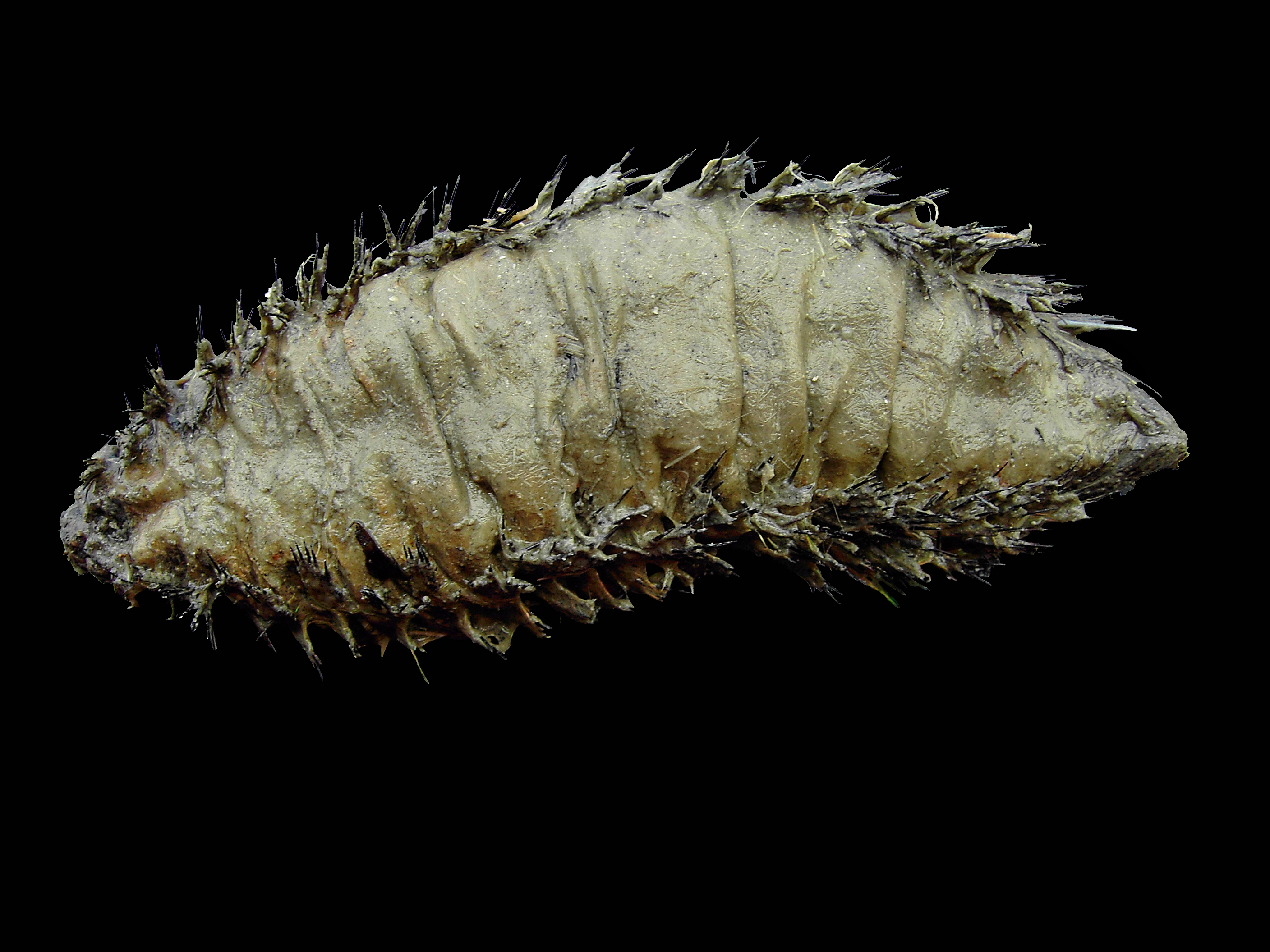
Dorsal view, removed from water

The name of the genus is taken from Aphrodite, the Ancient Greek goddess of love, said to be because of a resemblance to human female genitalia. The English name may derive from the animal's similarity, when washed up on shore, to a bedraggled house mouse.

== Description ==
Aphrodita adults generally fall within a size range of 7.5 to 15 centimetres (3.0 to 5.9 in), with some growing to 30 centimetres (12 in). The body is covered in a dense mat of parapodia and setae (hairlike structures). The animal lacks eyes, feeling its way with two pairs of appendages close to the mouth. Several small, bristly, paddle-like appendages provide locomotion. Aphrodita are hermaphroditic, having functional reproductive organs of both sexes, with the eggs of one individual being fertilised by the sperm of another.

== Structural coloration ==
The spines, or setae on the back of the animal are a unique feature. Normally, these have a deep red sheen. But when light shines on them perpendicularly, they flush green and blue – a "remarkable example of photonic engineering by a living organism". This structural coloration is a defense mechanism, giving a warning signal to potential predators. The effect is produced by many hexagonal cylinders within the spines, which are said to perform much more efficiently than man-made optical fibres.

== Feeding ==
Aphrodita are typically scavengers. However, Aphrodita aculeata is an active predator, feeding primarily on small crabs, hermit crabs, and other polychaete worms such as Pectinaria.

== Species ==
Species recognized by the World Register of Marine Species:

- Aphrodita abyssalis Kirkegaard, 1996
- Aphrodita aculeata Linnaeus, 1758
- Aphrodita acuminata Ehlers, 1887
- Aphrodita alta Kinberg, 1856
- Aphrodita annulata Pennant, 1777
- Aphrodita aphroditoides (McIntosh, 1885)
- Aphrodita armifera Moore, 1910
- Aphrodita audouini Castelnau, 1842
- Aphrodita australis Baird, 1865
- Aphrodita bamarookis Hutchings & McRae, 1993
- Aphrodita bisetosa Rozbaczylo & Canahuire, 2000
- Aphrodita brevitentaculata Essenberg, 1917
- Aphrodita californica Essenberg, 1917
- Aphrodita clavigera Freminville, 1812
- Aphrodita daiyumaruae Imajima, 2005
- Aphrodita decipiens (Horst, 1916)
- Aphrodita defendens Chamberlin, 1919
- Aphrodita diplops Fauchald, 1977
- Aphrodita echidna Quatrefages, 1866
- Aphrodita elliptica
- Aphrodita falcifera Hartman, 1939
- Aphrodita goolmarris Hutchings & McRae, 1993
- Aphrodita hoptakero Otto in Audouin & Milne Edwards, 1832
- Aphrodita japonica Marenzeller, 1879
- Aphrodita kulmaris Hutchings & McRae, 1993
- Aphrodita limosa (Horst, 1916)
- Aphrodita longicornis Kinberg, 1855
- Aphrodita longipalpa Essenberg, 1917
- Aphrodita macroculata Imajima, 2001
- Aphrodita magellanica Malard, 1891
- Aphrodita malayana (Horst, 1916)
- Aphrodita malkaris Hutchings & McRae, 1993
- Aphrodita maorica Benham, 1900
- Aphrodita marombis Hutchings & McRae, 1993
- Aphrodita mexicana Kudenov, 1975
- Aphrodita modesta Quatrefages, 1866
- Aphrodita negligens Moore, 1905
- Aphrodita nipponensis Imajima, 2003
- Aphrodita obtecta Ehlers, 1887
- Aphrodita parva Moore, 1905
- Aphrodita perarmata Roule, 1898
- Aphrodita refulgida Moore, 1910
- Aphrodita rossi Knox & Cameron, 1998
- Aphrodita roulei Horst, 1917
- Aphrodita scolopendra Bruguière, 1789
- Aphrodita sericea Castelnau, 1842
- Aphrodita sibogae (Horst, 1916)
- Aphrodita sondaica Grube, 1875
- Aphrodita sonorae Kudenov, 1975
- Aphrodita talpa Quatrefages, 1866
- Aphrodita terraereginae Haswell, 1883
- Aphrodita tosaensis Imajima, 2001
- Aphrodita watasei Izuka, 1912
