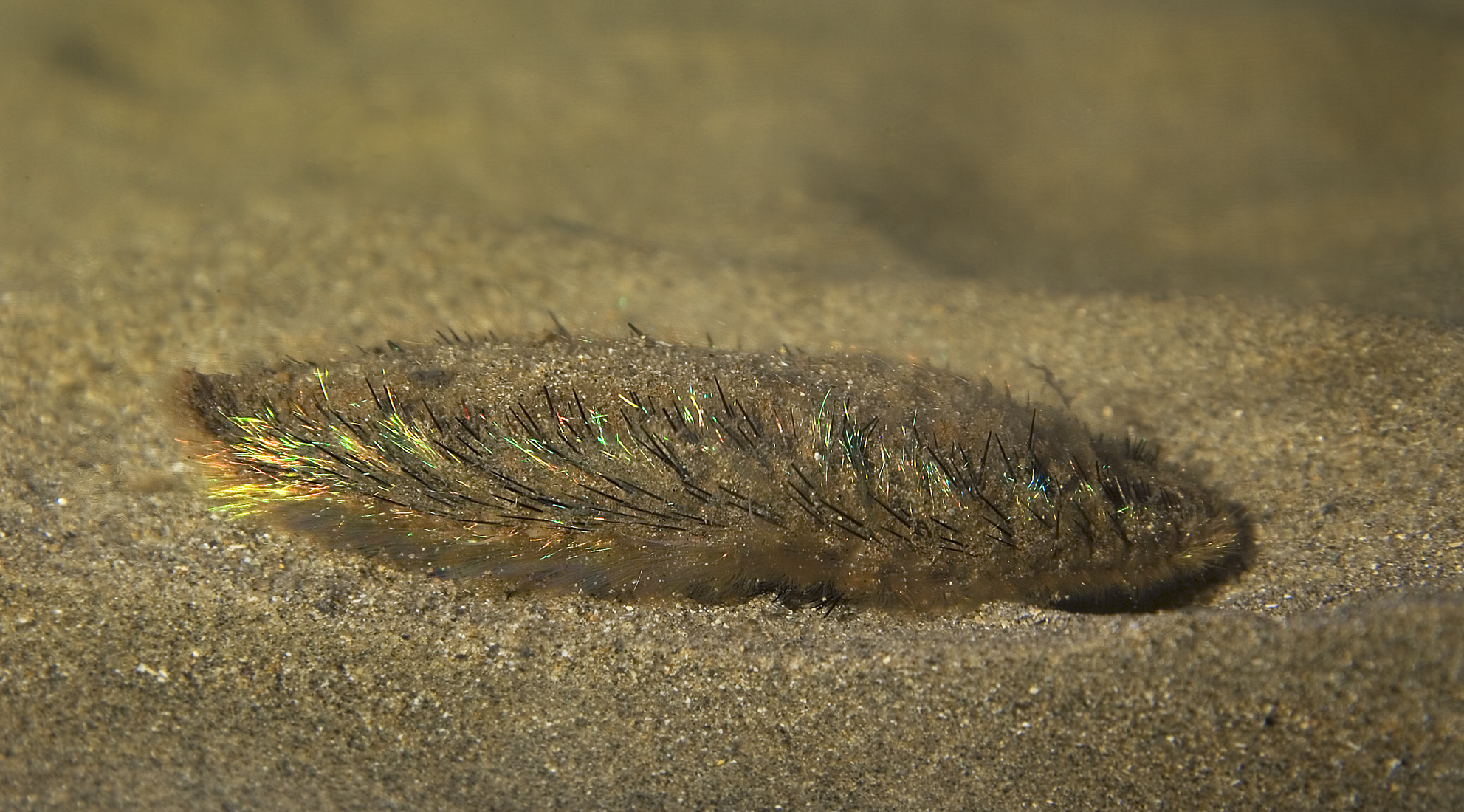

Scientific classification
- Kingdom: Animalia
- Phylum: Annelida
- Clade: Pleistoannelida
- Subclass: Errantia
- Order: Phyllodocida
- Family: Aphroditidae
- Genus: Aphrodita
- Species: A. aculeata

Binomial name
- Aphrodita aculeata Linnaeus, 1758

= Aphrodita aculeata =

Sea mouse, a marine worm

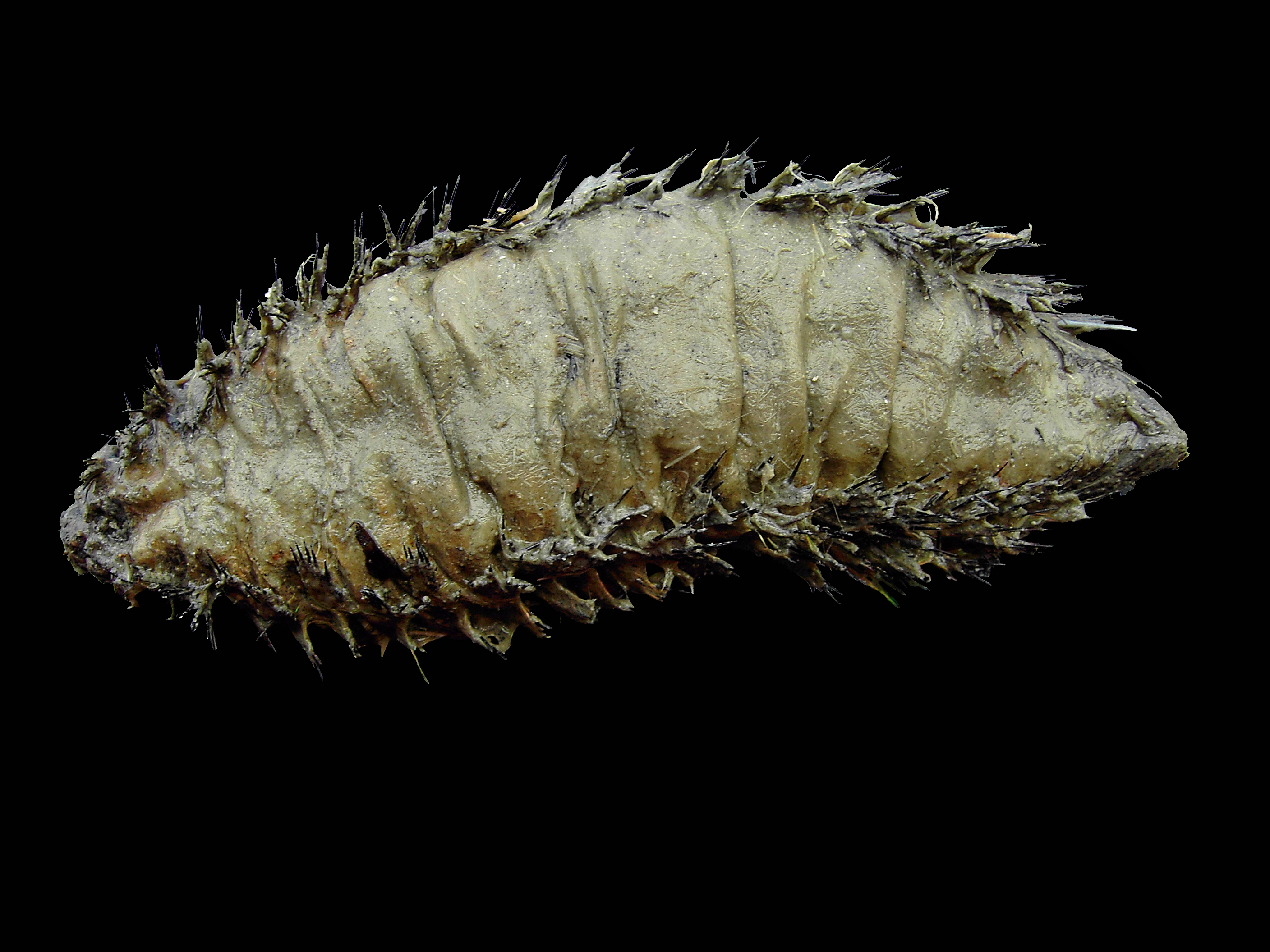
Dorsal view, removed from water

Aphrodita aculeata, the sea mouse, is a marine polychaete worm found in the North Atlantic Ocean and the North, Baltic, and Mediterranean Seas. The sea mouse normally lies buried head-first in the sand. It has been found at depths over 3,000 m (9,800 ft).

== Etymology ==
The name of the genus is taken from Aphrodite, the Ancient Greek goddess of love, said to be because of the worm's supposed resemblance to human female genitalia. The English name may derive from the resemblance to a bedraggled house mouse when washed up on shore. The specific name aculeata is the Latin for spiny.

== Description ==
The body of the sea mouse is covered in a dense mat of setae (hairlike structures). Adults generally fall within a size range of 10 to 20 cm (3.9 to 7.9 in).

== Structural coloration ==
The spines, or setae, on the scaled back of the sea mouse are some of its unique features. Normally, these have a deep red sheen, warning off predators, but when light shines on them perpendicularly, they flash green and blue, a "remarkable example of photonic engineering by a living organism". This structural coloration is a defense mechanism, giving a warning signal to potential predators. The effect is produced by many hexagonal cylinders within the spines, which "perform much more efficiently than man-made optical fibres".

== Feeding ==
The sea mouse is an active predator feeding primarily on small hermit and other crabs, and other polychaete worms, including Pectinaria and Lumbriconereis. It has been observed consuming other polychaete worms over three times its own body length. Feeding activity takes place at night, with the animal partially buried in sand.
