= Pectinaria gouldii =

Scientific classification
- Kingdom: Animalia
- Phylum: Annelida
- Clade: Pleistoannelida
- Clade: Sedentaria
- Order: Terebellida
- Family: Pectinariidae
- Genus: Pectinaria
- Species: P. gouldii

Binomial name
- Pectinaria gouldii Verrill, 1873

Synonyms
- Cistenides gouldii (Verrill, 1873); Pectinaria dubia (Webster, 1879); Pectinaria gouldi (Verrill, 1873)

Species of marine annelid worm

Pectinaria gouldii, commonly known as the ice cream cone worm, is a species of annelid in the trumpet worm family, Pectinariidae. Similar to other species of trumpet worms, P. gouldii creates a cone-shaped tube of sand that it lives in, giving the worm its common name.

== Description ==
Pectinaria gouldii has a relatively small, vermiform body that can be up to 50 mm long and 6 mm wide. The body is widest at the flattened oral end and tapers off at the rear. The body is a pale red and blue color. The head has two pairs of long antennae and two set of 15 comb-like golden bristles. Clusters of pale tentacles extend from underneath the mouth. On each side of the head are two pairs of bright red gills. Setae run along the body.

The tubes created by P. gouldii are a single grain of sand thick. As the annelid ages, the size of sediment used to make the tube increases at a rate dependent on population density and surrounding sediment. The slightly curved, cone-shaped tube can reach up to 65 mm long and 20 mm wide. The head of the annelid is found at the wider end of the tube, with the flattened head and bristles being used to plug the hole. This oral end of the tube faces downward in the sediment.

== Distribution and habitat ==
Pectinaria gouldii can be found along the western Atlantic Ocean from Canada to Brazil, including in the Gulf of Mexico and the Caribbean Sea. Within this range, the annelid can be found buried shallowly in both saltwater and brackish environments with sandy to muddy sediments. They can live from the low-tide line depths of 27 m.

== Biology ==
Pectinaria gouldii feeds by using the golden bristles to agitate the sediment underneath it. The annelid's tentacles then move the loosened sediment to its mouth, where it then choses to eat the sediment or not. If eaten, organic material is digested and the sediment passes through. If the sediment is not chosen, it will pass between the annelid's body and tube through currents created by the worm. Both fecal material and rejected sediment are released through the aboral end of the tube to create a small mound above the worm. The rate of sediment released slows during colder water temperatures as the metabolic rate of the worm decreases.
