= Thyellisca lamellosa =

Scientific classification
- Kingdom: Animalia
- Phylum: Mollusca
- Class: Bivalvia
- Order: Cardiida
- Family: Semelidae
- Genus: Thyellisca
- Species: T. lamellosa

Binomial name
- Thyellisca lamellosa (H. Adams, 1873)

Synonyms
- Cumingia elegans G.B. Sowerby II, 1873; Thyella lamellosa H. Adams, 1873

Species of bivalve

Thyellisca lamellosa is a species of marine clams in the family Semelidae.
