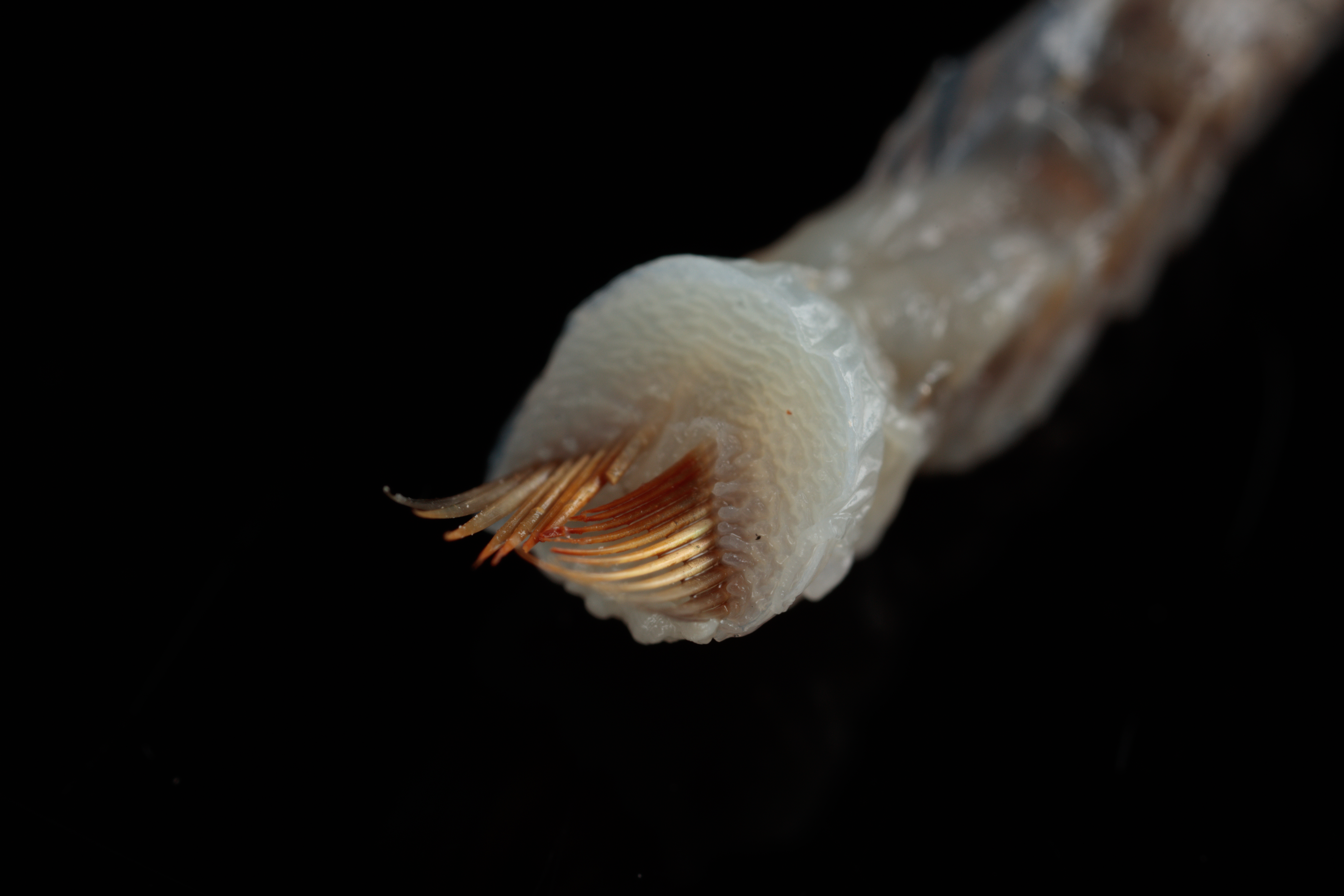

Scientific classification
- Kingdom: Animalia
- Phylum: Annelida
- Clade: Pleistoannelida
- Clade: Sedentaria
- Order: Terebellida
- Family: Pectinariidae
- Genus: Lagis
- Species: L. australis

Binomial name
- Lagis australis (Ehlers, 1904)

= Lagis australis =

Species of annelid worm

Lagis australis is one of at least ten species of polychaete worms of the family Pectinariidae. It is the only pectinariid species found in New Zealand.
