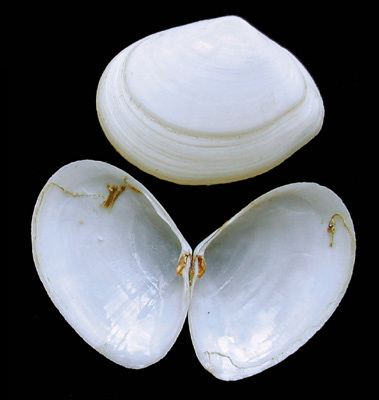
- Two complete shells of Abra alba, one closed and one open

Scientific classification
- Kingdom: Animalia
- Phylum: Mollusca
- Class: Bivalvia
- Order: Cardiida
- Superfamily: Tellinoidea
- Family: Semelidae
- Genus: Abra; Leach in Lamarck, 1818

Species
- See text.

Synonyms
- Abra (Abra) Lamarck, 1818 · alternate representation; Abrina Habe, 1952; Lutricularia Monterosato, 1884; Orixa Leach, 1852 junior subjective synonym; Semele (Abra) Lamarck, 1818; Semele (Syndosmya) Récluz, 1843; Syndesmya [sic] misspelling; Syndesmya (Abra) Lamarck, 1818; Syndesmya (Lutricularia) Monterosato, 1884 junior subjective synonym; Syndosmya Récluz, 1843 ·

= Abra (bivalve) =

Genus of bivalves

Abra is a genus of saltwater clams, marine bivalve mollusks in the family Semelidae. Members of this genus are mostly under 1.5 centimeters long, and have thin shells which are usually white. These bivalves normally live under the surface of sandy and muddy sediments, in the neritic zone.

They are considered an important food source for flat fish.

== Species ==
Species within the genus Abra include:

- Abra aegyptiaca P. G. Oliver & Zuschin, 2000
- Abra aequalis (Say, 1822)
- Abra affinis E. A. Smith, 1899
- Abra africana Bartsch, 1915
- Abra alba (Wood W., 1802)
- Abra braziliensis (E. A. Smith, 1885)
- Abra californica Kundsen, 1970
- Abra chuni (Jaeckel & Thiele, 1931)
- Abra cistula (Melvill, 1907)
- Abra convexior E. A. Smith, 1895
- † Abra cytheraeformis Cossmann & Peyrot, 1909
- † Abra deltoidea (Deshayes, 1857)
- Abra demosia (Dautzenberg & H. Fischer, 1906)
- † Abra depressa (Deshayes, 1857)
- † Abra deshayesi (Bosquet, 1864)
- † Abra difficilis (Deshayes, 1857)
- Abra elata Nicklès, 1955
- Abra exigua (H. Adams, 1862)
- † Abra exilis (Deshayes, 1857)
- Abra fragillima (Issel, 1869)
- † Abra fragosa (Marwick, 1931)
- Abra fujitai Habe, 1958
- Abra grimaldii (Dautzenberg & H. Fischer, 1906)
- Abra inanis Prashad, 1932
- Abra infans (E. A. Smith, 1885)
- † Abra inflata (Laws, 1939)
- Abra intesi Cosel, 1995
- Abra jarli Nicklès, 1955
- Abra kinoshitai (Kuroda & Habe, 1958)
- Abra kyurokusimana (Nomura & Hatai, 1940)
- † Abra lamberti (Deshayes, 1857)
- Abra lecointrei Nicklès, 1955
- Abra lioica (Dall, 1881)
- Abra longicallus Sacchi, 1836
- Abra longidentata M. Huber, 2015
- Abra lunella (A. Gould, 1861)
- † Abra macrodonta (Deshayes, 1857) †
- † Abra marshalli (H. J. Finlay, 1927) †
- † Abra media (Deshayes, 1857)
- Abra nitida (O. F. Mueller, 1776)
- † Abra obtusa (Deshayes, 1857)
- Abra pacifica Dall, 1915: synonym of Cumingia pacifica (Dall, 1915) (original combination)
- Abra palmeri Dall, 1915
- Abra philippinensis (E. A. Smith, 1885)
- Abra pilsbryi (Dautzenberg, 1912)
- Abra pini Cosel, 1995
- Abra prismatica (Montagu, 1808)
- Abra profundorum E. A. Smith, 1885
- † Abra pusilla (Lamarck, 1806)
- † Abra recluzii (Deshayes, 1857)
- † Abra reflexa (Eichwald, 1830)
- Abra regularis (E. A. Smith, 1885)
- Abra salamensis (Jaeckel & Thiele, 1931)
- Abra scarlatoi (Kamenev, 2004)
- Abra scotti M. Huber, 2010
- † Abra scythica (Sokolov, 1899)
- Abra segmentum (Récluz, 1843)
- Abra seurati (E. Lamy, 1906)
- Abra siberutensis (Thiele, 1931)
- Abra sibogai Prashad, 1932
- Abra soyoae Habe, 1958
- † Abra striatula (Deshayes, 1857)
- † Abra suessoniensis (Deshayes, 1857)
- Abra tenuis (Montagu, 1818)
- Abra tepocana Dall, 1915
- Abra truncata Hedley, 1906
- Abra uruguayensis (Pilsbry, 1897)
- † Abra vouastensis Périer, 1941
- Abra weberi Prashad, 1932

== Synonyms ==
- Abra bella Conrad, 1875: synonym of Semele bellastriata (Conrad, 1837)
- Abra brasiliana [sic]: synonym of Abra braziliensis (E. A. Smith, 1885) (misspelling)
- Abra cadabra Eames & Wilkins, 1957: synonym of Theora mesopotamica (Annandale, 1918)
- Abra fragilis Risso, 1826: synonym of Abra prismatica (Montagu, 1808)
- Abra intermedia (W. Thompson, 1845): synonym of Abra nitida (O. F. Müller, 1776)
- Abra isosceles (Hedley, 1909): synonym of Semele isosceles Hedley, 1909
- Abra kanamarui Kuroda, 1951: synonym of Abra lunella (A. Gould, 1861) 5junior subjective synonym)
- Abra kraemmeri Nicklès, 1955: synonym of Abra pilsbryi (Dautzenberg, 1912) (junior subjective synonym)
- Abra kurodai Habe, 1961: synonym of Abra fujitai Habe, 1958 ( junior subjective synonym)
- Abra lactea (Dunker, 1861) : synonym of Iacra seychellarum (A. Adams, 1856)
- Abra longicallis (R. A. Philippi, 1844): synonym of Abra longicallus (Scacchi, 1835) (unaccepted > unjustified emendation of Abra longicallus (Scacchi, 1835))
- Abra maxima (G. B. Sowerby III, 1894): synonym of Abra philippinensis (E. A. Smith, 1885)
- Abra milaschevichi Nevesskaja, 1963: synonym of Abra prismatica (Montagu, 1808)
- Abra nuculiformis Conrad, 1867: synonym of Abra aequalis (Say, 1822)
- Abra ovata (R. A. Philippi, 1836): synonym of Abra segmentum (Récluz, 1843) (junior homonym)
- Abra pacifica Dall, 1915: synonym of Cumingia pacifica (Dall, 1915) (original combination)
- † Abra patagonica Ihering, 1907: synonym of Abra uruguayensis (Pilsbry, 1897)
- Abra petiti (Dautzenberg, 1923): synonym of Iacra petiti Dautzenberg, 1923
- Abra renieri (Bronn, 1831): synonym of Abra alba (W. Wood, 1802)
- Abra segmentina H. Adams & A. Adams, 1856: synonym of Abra segmentum (Récluz, 1843)
- Abra seychellarum (A. Adams, 1856): synonym of Iacra seychellarum (A. Adams, 1856)
- Abra sinica F.-S. Xu, 1996: synonym of Moerella jedoensis (Lischke, 1872) : synonym of Moerella hilaris (Hanley, 1844)
- Abra skinoshitai [sic]: synonym of Abra kinoshitai (Kuroda & Habe, 1958) (misspelling)
- Abra trotteriana (G. B. Sowerby III, 1894): synonym of Iacra trotteriana (G. B. Sowerby III, 1894) (superseded combination)
