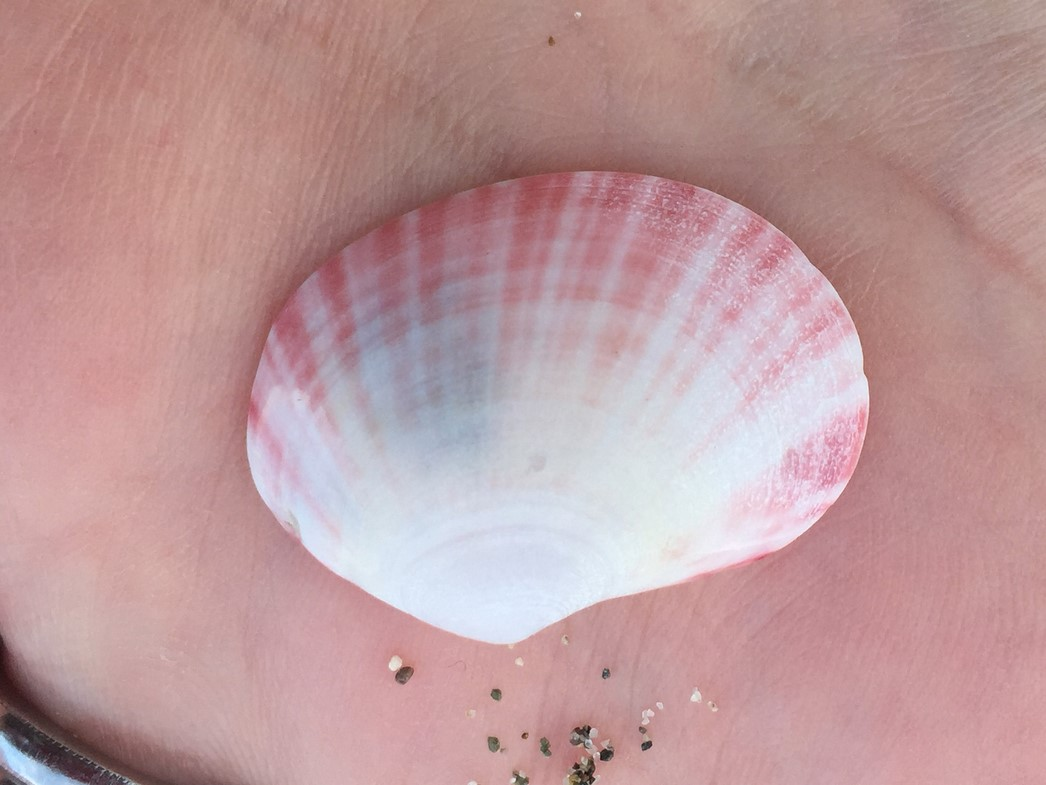
- Semele rubropicta

Scientific classification
- Kingdom: Animalia
- Phylum: Mollusca
- Class: Bivalvia
- Order: Cardiida
- Superfamily: Tellinoidea
- Family: Semelidae
- Genus: Semele; Schumacher, 1817

Type species
- Semele reticulata Schumacher, 1817

Synonyms
- Amphidesma Lamarck, 1818; Semele (Amphidesma) Lamarck, 1818· accepted, alternate representation; Semele (Elegantula) de Gregorio, 1885· accepted, alternate representation; Semele (Semele) Schumacher, 1817· accepted, alternate representation

= Semele (bivalve) =

Genus of bivalves

Semele is a genus of molluscs of the family Semelidae described in 1817 by Heinrich Christian Friedrich Schumacher.

== Species ==
- Semele amabilis (Reeve, 1853)
- Semele australis (G. B. Sowerby I, 1833)
- Semele barbarae (Boone, 1928)
- Semele bellastriata (Conrad, 1837)
- Semele bicolor (C. B. Adams, 1852)
- Semele californica (Reeve, 1853)
- Semele capensis E. A. Smith, 1904
- Semele carnicolor (Hanley, 1845)
- Semele casali Doello-Jurado, 1949
- Semele casta (Reeve, 1853)
- Semele compta (Reeve, 1853)
- Semele cordiformis (Holten, 1802)
- Semele corrugata (G. B. Sowerby I, 1833)
- Semele craneana Hertlein & A. M. Strong, 1949
- Semele crenulata (Reeve, 1853)
- Semele decisa (Conrad, 1837)
- Semele duplicata (G. B. Sowerby I in Reeve, 1853)
- Semele elliptica (G. B. Sowerby I, 1833)
- Semele exarata (A. Adams & Reeve, 1850)
- Semele flavescens (Gould, 1851)
- Semele formosa (G. B. Sowerby I, 1833)
- Semele gruneri (Reeve, 1853)
- Semele hanleyi Angas, 1879
- Semele hedlandi M. Huber, 2010
- Semele iscovichorum Valentich-Scott, Coan & Zelaya, 2020
- Semele jamesi Coan, 1988
- Semele jovis (Reeve, 1853)
- Semele jucunda (Reeve, 1853)
- Semele laevis (G. B. Sowerby I, 1833)
- Semele lamellosa (G. B. Sowerby I in Reeve, 1853)
- Semele lamyi Nicklès, 1955
- Semele lenticularis (G. B. Sowerby I, 1833)
- Semele martinii (Reeve, 1853)
- Semele modesta (Reeve, 1853)
- Semele natalensis M. Huber, 2010
- † Semele neuvillei Cossmann & Peyrot, 1909
- Semele pallida (G. B. Sowerby I, 1833)
- Semele phryne Angas, 1879
- Semele pilsbryi Olsson, 1961
- Semele proficua (Pulteney, 1799)
- Semele pulchra (G. B. Sowerby I, 1832)
- Semele purpurascens (Gmelin, 1791)
- Semele radiata (Say, 1826)
- Semele rosea (G. B. Sowerby I, 1833)
- Semele rubropicta Dall, 1871
- Semele rupicola Dall, 1915
- Semele rupium (G. B. Sowerby I, 1833)
- Semele scabra (Hanley, 1843)
- Semele solida (J. E. Gray, 1828)
- Semele sowerbyi Tryon, 1869
- Semele tortuosa (C. B. Adams, 1852)
- Semele trindadis Simone, 2021
- Semele venusta (Reeve, 1853)
- Semele verrucosa Mörch, 1860
- Semele vestalis (A. Adams in Reeve, 1853)
- Semele zalosa Chesney & P. G. Oliver, 1994
- Semele zebuensis (Hanley, 1843)

Synonyms

- Semele ada A. Adams & Angas, 1864: synonym of Myrtea ada (A. Adams & Angas, 1864) (original combination)
- Semele alveata Gould, 1861: synonym of Semele carnicolor (Hanley, 1845)
- Semele amoena (Reeve, 1853): synonym of Semele proficua (Pulteney, 1799)
- Semele aphrodite Angas, 1879: synonym of Semele cordiformis (Holten, 1802)
- Semele ashleyi Hertlein & Grant, 1972: synonym of Semele rubropicta Dall, 1871
- Semele aspasia Angas, 1879: synonym of Semele carnicolor (Hanley, 1845)
- Semele aurora Tursch & Pierret, 1964: synonym of Semele martinii (Reeve, 1853)
- Semele brambleyae Powell, 1967: synonym of Semele vestalis (A. Adams in Reeve, 1853) (Single New Zealand specimen presumably introduced)
- Semele braziliensis E. A. Smith, 1885: synonym of Abra braziliensis (E. A. Smith, 1885) (original combination)
- Semele carolinensis Conrad, 1867: synonym of Semele proficua (Pulteney, 1799)
- Semele clydosa Bernard, 1983: synonym of Semele sowerbyi Tryon, 1869
- Semele crenata A. Adams & Angas, 1864: synonym of Semele crenulata (Reeve, 1853) (junior synonym)
- Semele duplicata Gould, 1861: synonym of Semele zebuensis (Hanley, 1843)
- Semele exigua H. Adams, 1862: synonym of Abra exigua (H. Adams, 1862) (original combination)
- Semele fazisa Gregorio, 1884: synonym of Semele striata (Reeve, 1853): synonym of Cumingia deshayesiana Vaillant, 1865
- Semele floreanensis Soot-Ryen, 1932: synonym of Semele rupium (G. B. Sowerby I, 1833)
- Semele fucata Mörch, 1861: synonym of Semele bicolor (C. B. Adams, 1852)
- Semele gouldi Tryon, 1869: synonym of Semele zebuensis (Hanley, 1843)
- Semele gratiosa Reeve, 1853: synonym of Semele zebuensis (Hanley, 1843) (introduced in synonymy)
- Semele guaymasensis Pilsbry & H. N. Lowe, 1932: synonym of Semele hanleyi Angas, 1879
- Semele hertleini Durham, 1950: synonym of Semele verrucosa Mörch, 1860
- Semele incongrua Carpenter, 1864: synonym of Semele venusta (Reeve, 1853)
- Semele infans E. A. Smith, 1885: synonym of Abra infans (E. A. Smith, 1885) (original combination)
- Semele jaramija Pilsbry & Olsson, 1941: synonym of Semele verrucosa Mörch, 1860
- Semele junonia Verrill, 1870: synonym of Semele rosea (G. B. Sowerby I, 1833)
- Semele lata Bush, 1885: synonym of Semele bellastriata (Conrad, 1837)
- † Semele leana Dall, 1900: synonym of Semele rosea (G. B. Sowerby I, 1833)
- Semele macandreae H. Adams, 1870: synonym of Semele striata (Reeve, 1853): synonym of Cumingia deshayesiana Vaillant, 1865
- Semele margarita Olsson, 1961: synonym of Semele verrucosa Mörch, 1860
- Semele mediamericana Pilsbry & H. N. Lowe, 1932: synonym of Semele proficua (Pulteney, 1799)
- Semele modesta A. Adams, 1854: synonym of Semele modesta (Reeve, 1853)
- Semele monilis Tate, 1891: synonym of Semele jucunda (Reeve, 1853)
- Semele nexilis Gould, 1862: synonym of Semele bellastriata (Conrad, 1837)
- Semele nitida (O. F. Müller, 1776): synonym of Abra nitida (O. F. Müller, 1776)
- Semele nuculoidea: synonym of Semelina nuculoides (Conrad in Hodge, 1841) (misspelling)
- Semele obliqua (Wood, 1815): synonym of Semele purpurascens (Gmelin, 1791)
- Semele ornata Gould, 1862: synonym of Semele purpurascens (Gmelin, 1791)
- Semele pacifica Dall, 1915: synonym of Semele verrucosa Mörch, 1860
- Semele paziana Hertlein & A. M. Strong, 1949: synonym of Semele pallida (G. B. Sowerby I, 1833)
- Semele philippinensis E. A. Smith, 1885: synonym of Abra philippinensis (E. A. Smith, 1885) (original combination)
- Semele piperata (Poiret, 1789): synonym of Scrobicularia plana (da Costa, 1778)
- Semele planata Carpenter, 1856: synonym of Semele tortuosa (C. B. Adams, 1852)
- Semele profundorum E. A. Smith, 1885: synonym of Abra profundorum (E. A. Smith, 1885)
- Semele purpurascens (Gmelin, 1791) sensu Nicklès, 1950: synonym of Semele lamyi Nicklès, 1955
- Semele quentinensis Dall, 1921: synonym of Semele pulchra (G. B. Sowerby I, 1833)
- Semele radiata (Reeve, 1853): synonym of Semele cordiformis (Holten, 1802) (junior homonym)
- Semele regularis Dall, 1915: synonym of Semele pallida (G. B. Sowerby I, 1833) (invalid: junior homonym of Semele regularis E.A. Smith, 1885; S. paziana is a replacement name)
- Semele regularis E. A. Smith, 1885: synonym of Abra regularis (E. A. Smith, 1885) (original combination)
- Semele reticulata Schumacher, 1817: synonym of Semele proficua (Pulteney, 1799)
- Semele rubrotincta Carpenter, 1857: synonym of Semele decisa (Conrad, 1837)
- Semele scabra (Hanley, 1843) sensu Bosch & Bosch, 1982: synonym of Semele zalosa Chesney & P. G. Oliver, 1994 (misapplication)
- Semele shoplandi Melvill, 1898: synonym of Semele cordiformis (Holten, 1802)
- Semele simplicissima Pilsbry & H. N. Lowe, 1932: synonym of Semele pallida (G. B. Sowerby I, 1833)
- Semele sinensis A. Adams, 1854: synonym of Semele cordiformis (Holten, 1802)
- Semele sowerbyi Lamy, 1912: synonym of Semele barbarae (Boone, 1928) (invalid: junior homonym of Semele sowerbyi Tryon, 1869)
- Semele sparsilineata Dall, 1915: synonym of Semele purpurascens (Gmelin, 1791)
- Semele striata (Reeve, 1853): synonym of Cumingia deshayesiana Vaillant, 1865
- Semele tabogensis Pilsbry & H. N. Lowe, 1932: synonym of Semele rosea (G. B. Sowerby I, 1833)
- Semele tita Dall, Bartsch & Rehder, 1938: synonym of Semele australis (G. B. Sowerby I, 1833)
- Semele uruguayensis Pilsbry, 1897: synonym of Abra uruguayensis (Pilsbry, 1897)
- Semele verruculastra Keen, 1966: synonym of Semele formosa (G. B. Sowerby I, 1833)
- Semele virginiana Meyer, 1888: synonym of Semelina nuculoides (Conrad in Hodge, 1841)
- Semele warburtoni Tenison Woods, 1877: synonym of Codakia orbicularis (Linnaeus, 1758) (junior synonym)
