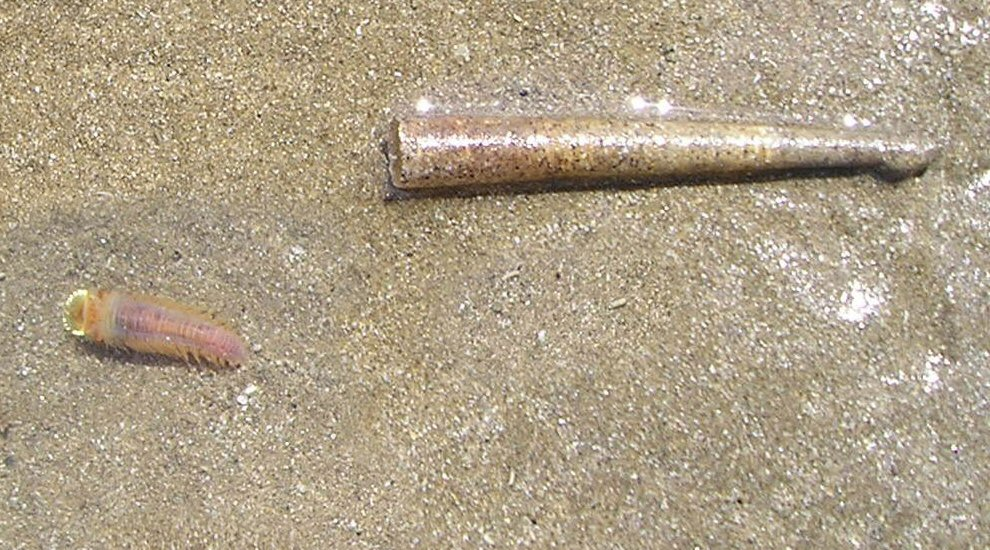
- The trumpet worm and its tube.

Scientific classification
- Kingdom: Animalia
- Phylum: Annelida
- Clade: Pleistoannelida
- Clade: Sedentaria
- Order: Terebellida
- Family: Pectinariidae
- Genus: Lagis
- Species: L. koreni

Binomial name
- Lagis koreni Malmgren, 1866

Synonyms
- Pectinaria (Lagis) koreni (Malmgren, 1866); Pectinaria (Lagis) neapolitana (Claparède, 1869); Pectinaria (Lagis) pseudokoreni Day, 1955; Pectinaria koreni (Malmgren, 1866); Pectinaria malmgreni Grube, 1870; Pectinaria neapolitana Claparède, 1869; Pectinaria robust Levinsen, 1883; Solen fragilis Klein in McIntosh, 1922

= Lagis koreni =

Species of annelid worm

Lagis koreni, commonly known as the trumpet worm, is a species of marine polychaete worm found in European waters. It lives within a narrow conical tube made of grains of sand and shell fragments.

== Taxonomy ==
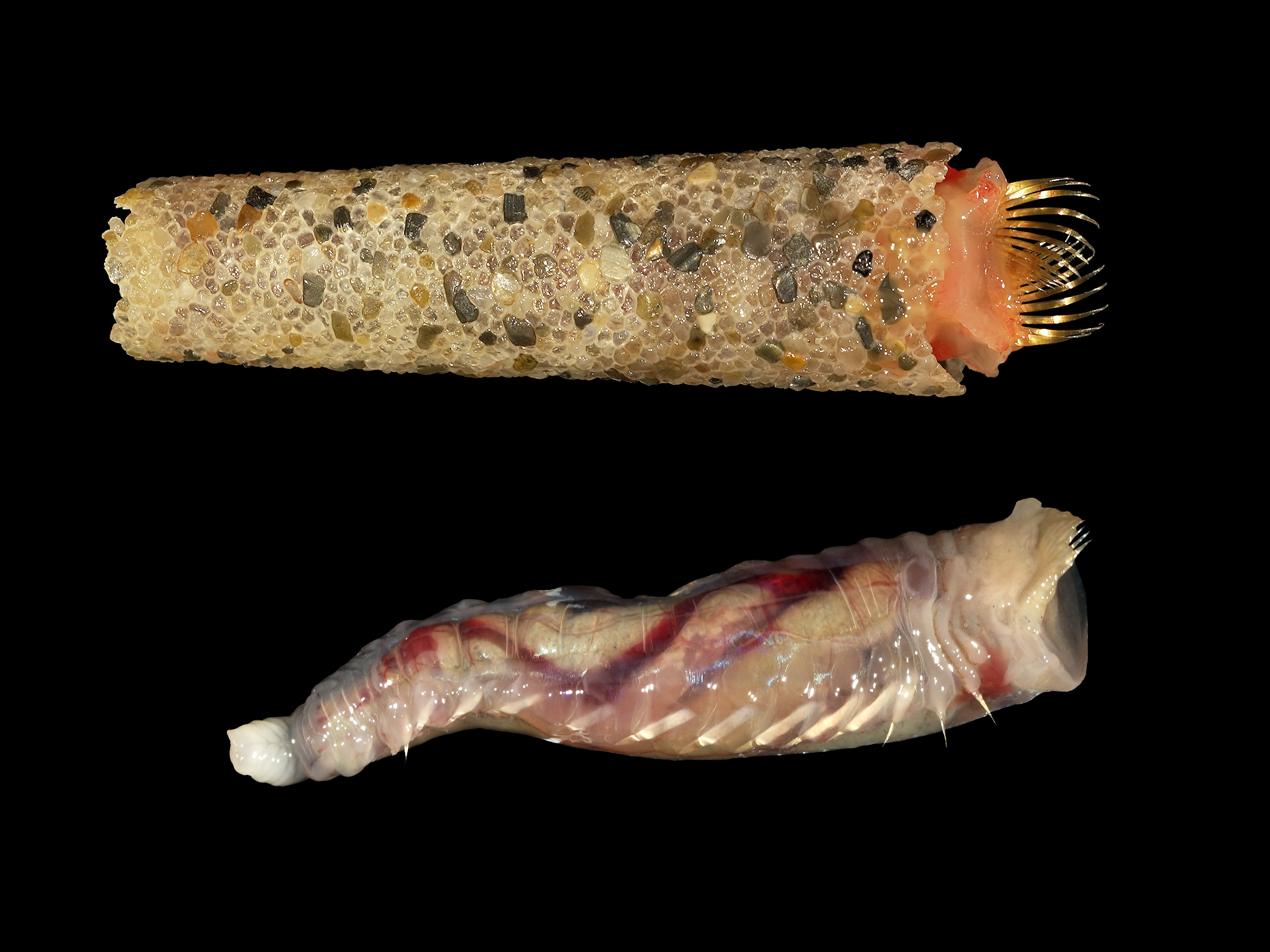
The trumpet worm inside and outside its tube.

In 1986, Holthe studied the family Pectinariidae and recognised four subgenera within the genus Pectinaria although he did not justify how he had come to this decision. In further reviews in 1973 and again in 1984, neither Long nor Wolf recognised these subgenera. In 2002, Pat Hutchings and Rachael Peart undertook a further review of the family. Among other findings, they determined that the Pectinaris subgenera should be given full species status. So the species that had been classified as Pectinaria koreni and later as Pectinaria (Lagis) koreni became Lagis koreni.

== Description ==
The trumpet worm is about 5 cm (2 in) long and relatively broad. The head has two pairs of tentacles and two bunches of gleaming golden spines which are used for digging. It also bears an operculum for sealing the tube in which it lives. The anterior fifteen body segments each bear chaetae or bristles, projecting laterally. These grow from a massive base and have six to eight rows of modified hooks and four rows of tiny teeth. The posterior segment is flattened and bears no chaetae. The animal is pale pink and iridescent, with two pairs of red gills and several red blood vessels visible beneath the surface. It lives inside a long, narrow, conical tube composed of a single layer of grains of sand and shell fragments, skilfully cemented together like a mosaic with a biomineralized adhesive substance secreted by specialized glands.

== Distribution and habitat ==
L. koreni is found in the seas bordering northwestern Europe including the Arctic Ocean, the Atlantic Ocean, the North Sea, the Mediterranean Sea and the Adriatic Sea. It is usually found buried in sand or silty sand in the neritic zone.

== Biology ==
The cone-shaped tube of L. koreni is open at both ends, with the narrow end level with or slightly above the surface of the sediment. The worm lives head down in this tube and collects sub-surface particles with its tentacles. In the process it excavates a "feeding cavern" and also forages with the tentacles in the surrounding substrate. It is even able to extend its tentacles as far as the interface between the sediment and the water. It passes the particles it collects via a ciliated groove in the tentacles to its mouth. It is a messy feeder and some particles fall off but these are trapped in the feeding cavern and can be consumed later. After processing the mineral grains and organic matter, unconsolidated faeces are ejected at the posterior, narrow end of the tube and are deposited on the sea floor. Some pseudo-faeces are similarly ejected, having been passed up between the worm and the tube. In some fine-grained sediment, the worm also forms a burrow up to the surface from its feeding cavern, actively keeping it open. Because the worm is constantly irrigating its tube by pumping water through it, suspended particles on the sea bed and in the water column are sometimes drawn into the feeding cavern and ingested.

It has been found that foraminifera, ciliates and small copepods are the main diet of the worm. However it disproportionally favours larger particles including nematodes, crustaceans and larger foraminifera even though these are too big to be digested. These large particles also include faecal pellets of Abra alba, a bivalve mollusc, large numbers of which share the same habitat. Any nutritive benefit to the worm of this practice probably depends on the assimilation of organic molecules and microbes adhering to the surface of the pellet or soluble components from inside. The pellets themselves are ejected relatively unchanged.

Sexual reproduction takes place in the summer. In a study off the coast of Wales, the worm released sperm in bundles into the water column in May and the ova matured at the same time. The larvae formed part of the zooplankton for a few weeks before undergoing metamorphosis and settling out in June. The larvae began producing mucus tubes while still pelagic and on settling, started cementing sand grains on to the opening of the tubes. The young worms grew quickly until the onset of winter, when growth ceased.

== Ecology ==
The trumpet worm is sometimes found at a density of a thousand individuals per square metre, but numbers fluctuate greatly. Species associated with the trumpet worm in a community include the white furrow shell (Abra alba), the transparent razor shell (Phaxas pellucidus), the bivalve Mysella bidentata, the serpent star (Ophiura ophiura) and various polychaete worms. It has been found in studies of Liverpool Bay that in areas where the sediment has been disturbed by dredging and more deposition has occurred, Lagis koreni and Phaxas pellucidus often come to dominate the community. Also in these studies, the community was shown to be associated with different habitats.

The trumpet worm is often eaten by bottom-feeding fish including juvenile common dabs and plaice.
