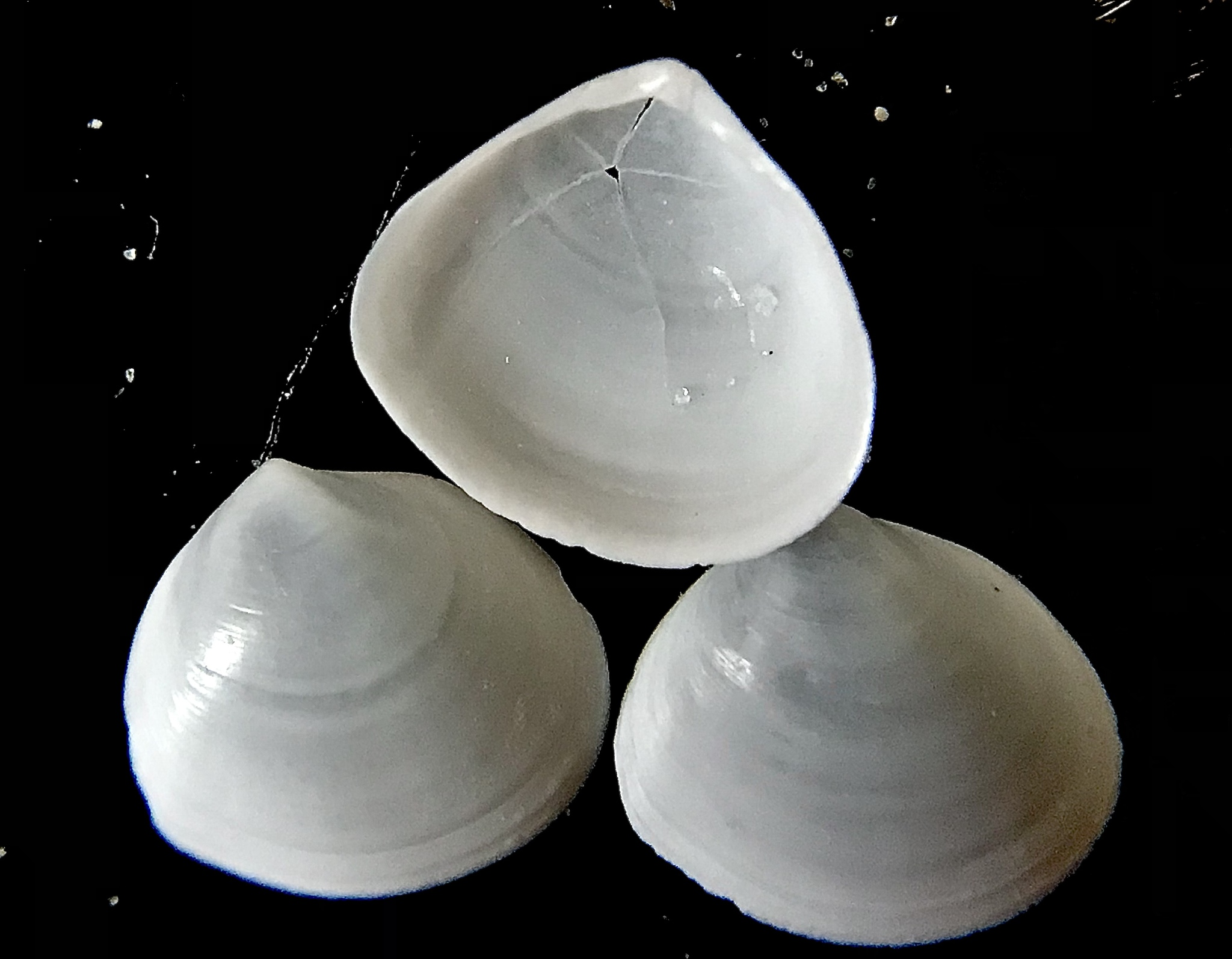

Scientific classification
- Kingdom: Animalia
- Phylum: Mollusca
- Class: Bivalvia
- Order: Cardiida
- Family: Semelidae
- Genus: Abra
- Species: A. aequalis

Binomial name
- Abra aequalis (Say, 1822)

Synonyms
- Amphidesma aequalis Say, 1822; Amphidesma equalis Say, 1822 in Conrad, 1845; Abra nuculiformis Conrad, 1867; Abra equalis (Say, 1822)

= Abra aequalis =

Abra aequalis Temporal range: Late Miocene–Present

Species of marine mollusc

Abra aequalis, also known as the Atlantic abra, is a species of marine bivalve found in the west Atlantic Ocean.

== Taxonomy ==
Abra aequalis was first scientifically described under the name Amphidesma aequalis by Thomas Say in 1822. In 1858, it was transferred to the genus Abra by Francis Simmons Holmes in an account of recent fossils from South Carolina.

Abra is classified in the family Semelidae, in the same order (Cardiida) as the cockle shells. Its common names include the "Atlantic abra" and the "common Atlantic furrow-shell".

== Description ==
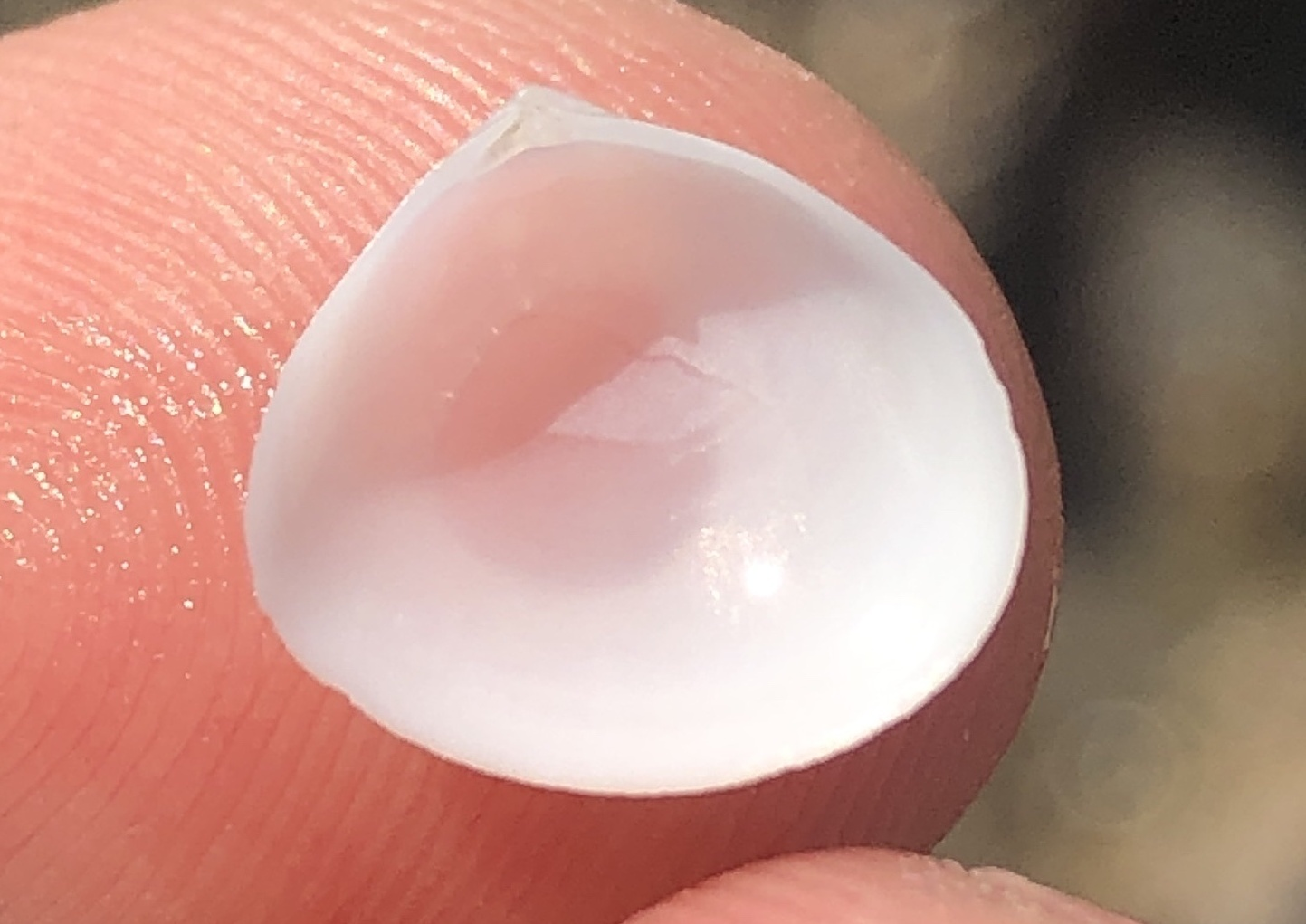
Shell specimen from Florida on a human finger for scale

Abra aequalis is a small species with plain, white, mostly smooth shells which are slightly round, but triangular in outline. Due to their small size (about 7 millimetres [0.28 in]), A. aequalis is one of several unremarkable, similar-looking species fondly called "little white clams" by amateur shell collectors. The shells are quite thin and fragile, and Robert Parr Whitfield summarized their appearance thus: "it is a very neat and pretty shell, and moderately abundant".

== Distribution, habitat, and ecology ==
Abra aequalis is found along the southeastern coast of the United States, the Gulf of Mexico, the Caribbean Sea, and the coast of southeastern Brazil. The Global Biodiversity Information Facility records observations from as far north as Long Island. It is abundant along the American coast, around Florida, and is also found around Mexico and the Caribbean Islands. In South America, it is found on the coasts of Venezuela, Suriname, and Panama, as well as on the Brazilian coast from São Paulo to Pelotas.

A. aequalis is usually found in shallow waters of depth less than 73 metres (240 ft). It has also been observed on seamounts and underwater knolls. A 1973 study off Sapelo Island, United States, found that A. aequalis became the dominant species in spring. A. aequalis is the most significant food source for Luidia senegalensis in Florida.

== Fossil record ==
The fossil record of Abra aequalis is reasonably well documented. It has been found as fossils abundantly in the Quaternary (current) period in many countries and in the Pliocene of several. It is also known from the Miocene.
