= Ervilia =

Scientific classification
- Kingdom: Animalia
- Phylum: Mollusca
- Class: Bivalvia
- Order: Cardiida
- Superfamily: Tellinoidea
- Family: Semelidae
- Genus: Ervilia; Turton, 1822

Species
- See text.

Genus of bivalves

Ervilia is a genus of marine clams in the family Semelidae.

== Species ==
- Ervilia bisculpta Gould, 1861
- Ervilia castanea (Montagu, 1803)
- Ervilia concentrica (Holmes, 1860)
- Ervilia nitens (Montagu, 1808)
- Ervilia producta Odhner, 1922
- Ervilia purpurea (Smith, 1906)
- Ervilia scaliola
