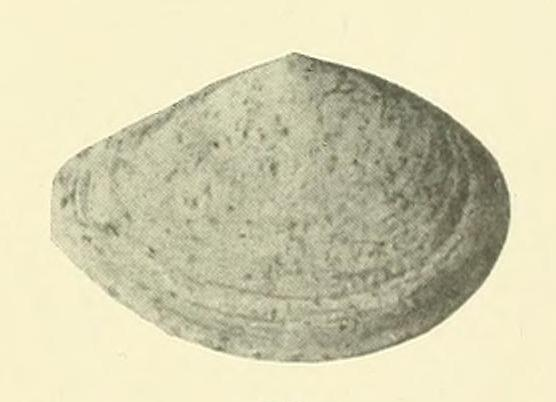
- Theora mesopotamica

Scientific classification
- Kingdom: Animalia
- Phylum: Mollusca
- Class: Bivalvia
- Order: Cardiida
- Superfamily: Tellinoidea
- Family: Semelidae
- Genus: Theora; H. Adams and A. Adams, 1856

Synonyms
- Theora (Endopleura) A. Adams, 1864 · alternate representation; Theora (Theora) H. Adams & A. Adams, 1856 · alternate representation

= Theora (bivalve) =

Theora Temporal range: Late Pliocene–Recent, 3.6–0 Ma

Genus of Semelidae

Theora is a genus of marine and brackish-water bivalves in the family Semelidae.

== Species ==
Species accepted as of September 2026:

- Theora alfredensis Bartsch, 1915
- Theora iridescens (Hinds, 1843)
- Theora lata (Hinds, 1843)
- Theora lubrica Gould, 1861
- Theora mesopotamica (Annandale, 1918)
- Theora moulinsii (Récluz, 1869)
- Theora nasuta Hedley, 1909
- Theora opalina (Hinds, 1843)
- Theora translucens Preston, 1916

Synonyms

- Theora cadabra (Eames & Wilkins, 1957) accepted as Theora mesopotamica (Annandale, 1918) (junior synonym)
- Theora fragilis (A. Adams, 1856) accepted as Theora lata (Hinds, 1843)
- Theora hindsiana Preston, 1916 accepted as Theora iridescens (Hinds, 1843)
- Theora nitida Gould, 1861 accepted as Theora lata (Hinds, 1843)
- Theora ovalis E. A. Smith, 1904 accepted as Aligena ovalis (E. A. Smith, 1904) (original combination)
