= Thyellisca =

Scientific classification
- Domain: Eukaryota
- Kingdom: Animalia
- Phylum: Mollusca
- Class: Bivalvia
- Order: Cardiida
- Family: Semelidae
- Genus: Thyellisca; H. E. Vokes, 1956

Species
- Thyellisca hargravesi; Thyellisca pulchra; Thyellisca lamellosa (H. Adams, 1873)

Genus of bivalves

Thyellisca is a genus of marine clams in the family Semelidae.
