= Theora lubrica =

Scientific classification
- Kingdom: Animalia
- Phylum: Mollusca
- Class: Bivalvia
- Order: Cardiida
- Family: Semelidae
- Genus: Theora
- Species: T. lubrica

Binomial name
- Theora lubrica Gould, 1861

Species of bivalve

Theora lubrica is a bivalve mollusc endemic to the Northwest Pacific, including northern Japan, southern Russia and Hong Kong. It was introduced into harbours around the North Island of New Zealand around 1972, and has since spread to the upper South Island. It has also been introduced to California, Australia, the Mediterranean Sea and the Atlantic Sea.

Theora lubrica is a deposit feeder with a thin, nearly transparent shell. Theora lubrica is mud-tolerant and lives in burrows on subtidal and lower intertidal flats. Theora lubrica is considered a pollution-indicator species as it is tolerant of pollution and is often found to be abundant in polluted sediments.
