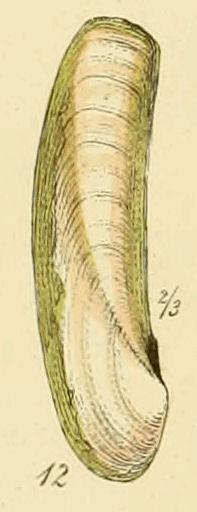

Scientific classification
- Kingdom: Animalia
- Phylum: Mollusca
- Class: Bivalvia
- Order: Adapedonta
- Family: Pharidae
- Genus: Phaxas
- Species: P. pellucidus

Binomial name
- Phaxas pellucidus (Pennant, 1777)

Synonyms
- Cultellus pellucidus Pennant, 1777; Solen pygmaeus Lamarck, 1818

= Phaxas pellucidus =

Species of bivalve

Phaxas pellucidus, the transparent razor shell, is a species of marine bivalve mollusc in the family Pharidae. It is found buried in the seabed in coastal waters of northwest Europe, often in great numbers.

== Description ==
P. pellucidus is a very small razor shell seldom exceeding 4 cm (2 in) in length. The colour is cream or dull white, sometimes with reddish markings. The periostracum is olive-coloured and glossy. The two elongated valves are fragile and equal in size. The dorsal side of each is straight while the ventral side is slightly curved giving a pod-like appearance. The anterior end is rounded while the posterior end is slightly truncate. There are fine sculptured lines parallel to the margins, which are themselves smooth. The ligament joining the valves is external and located close to the beaks which are very close to the anterior end. Pharus legumen is a somewhat similar species but it can be distinguished by its larger size and more cylindrical outline and the differences in the hinge teeth.

== Distribution ==
P. pellucidus occurs in the northeastern Atlantic Ocean, ranging from Norway and the Baltic Sea southwards to Spain and Portugal, including the North Sea and English Channel. It is found around the coasts of the British Isles.

== Biology ==
This species is often abundant in muddy sand at depths of up to 200 metres. It is a filter feeder and extends its siphons to the surface to circulate water through its mantle where it extract food fragments. Studies in Liverpool Bay show that where the sea bed has been disturbed by dredging and deposition of further sediment has occurred, P. pellucidus and the polychaete worm Lagis koreni often come to dominate the community, which includes another bivalve, Abra alba. In the study, this particular community is believed to be associated with more than one biotope (the habitat of a community).
