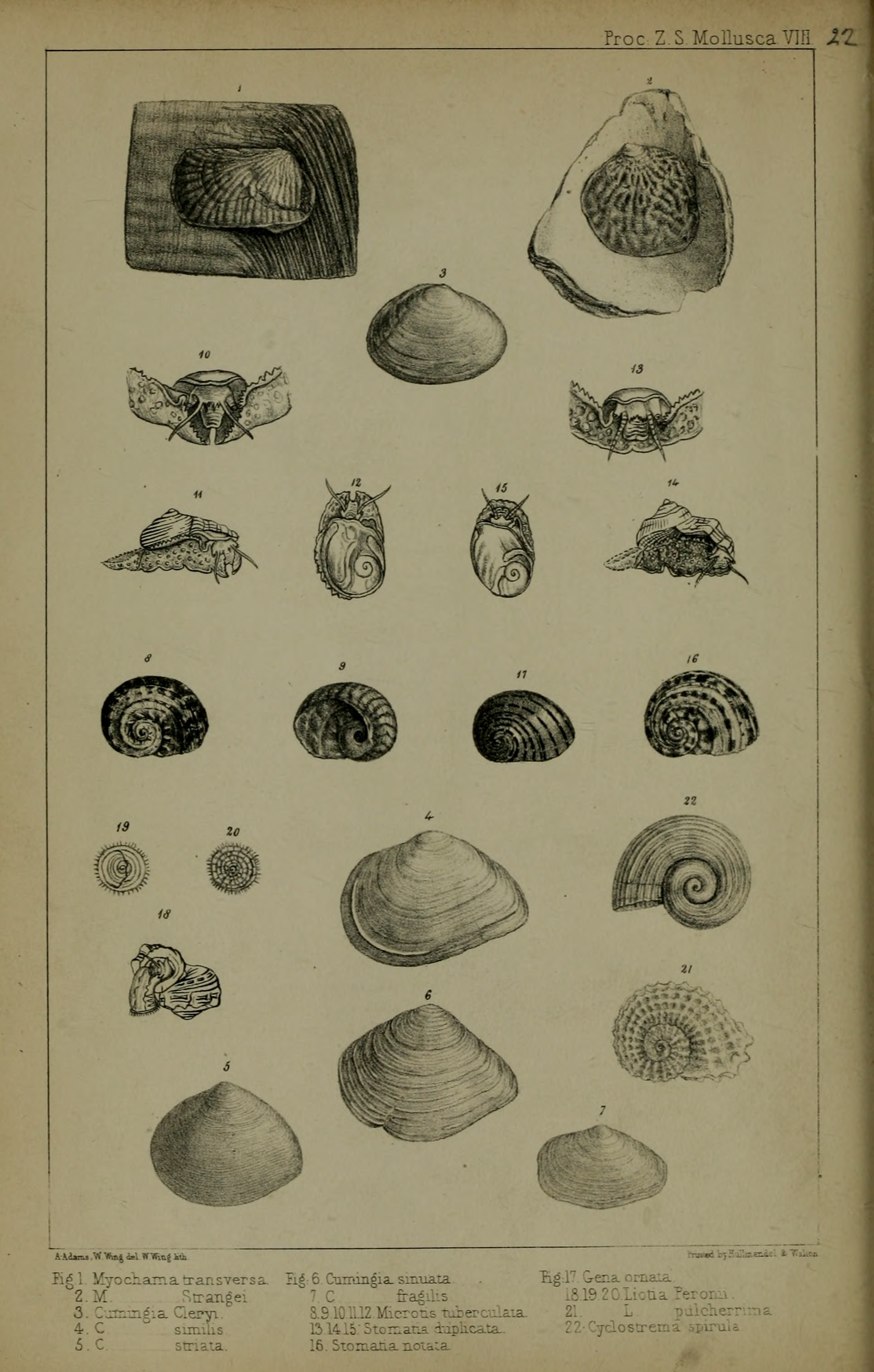
- 3: Cumingia Cleryi [sic] A.Adams = Mulinia byronensis Gray, 1837 4: Cumingia] similis A.Adams = Cumingia californica Conrad, 1837; 5: Cumingia striata A.Adams = Cumingia mutica G.B.Sowerby, 1833; 6: Cumingia sinuosa A.Adams, 1850; 7: Cumingia fragilis A.Adams = Cumingia antillarum A.Adams, 1850

Scientific classification
- Kingdom: Animalia
- Phylum: Mollusca
- Class: Bivalvia
- Order: Cardiida
- Superfamily: Tellinoidea
- Family: Semelidae
- Genus: Cumingia; G. B. Sowerby I, 1833

Species
- See text.

= Cumingia =

Genus of bivalves

Cumingia is a genus of marine clams in the family Semelidae. It is also represented in the fossil record.

Cumingia lamellosa is an introduced species in Venezuela.

== Species ==
- Cumingia antillarum A.Adams, 1850
- Cumingia californica Conrad, 1837
- Cumingia coarctata G. B. Sowerby I, 1833
- Cumingia lamellosa (Sowerby, 1833)
- Cumingia mutica G.B.Sowerby, 1833
- Cumingia sinuosa A.Adams, 1850
- Cumingia tellinoides (Conrad, 1831)

Names brought to synonymy

- Cumingia elegans G.B. Sowerby II, 1873 is a synonym for Thyellisca lamellosa (H. Adams, 1873)
- Cumingia parthenopaea Tiberi, 1855 is a synonym for Poromya granulata.

== See also ==
- List of marine molluscs of Venezuela
