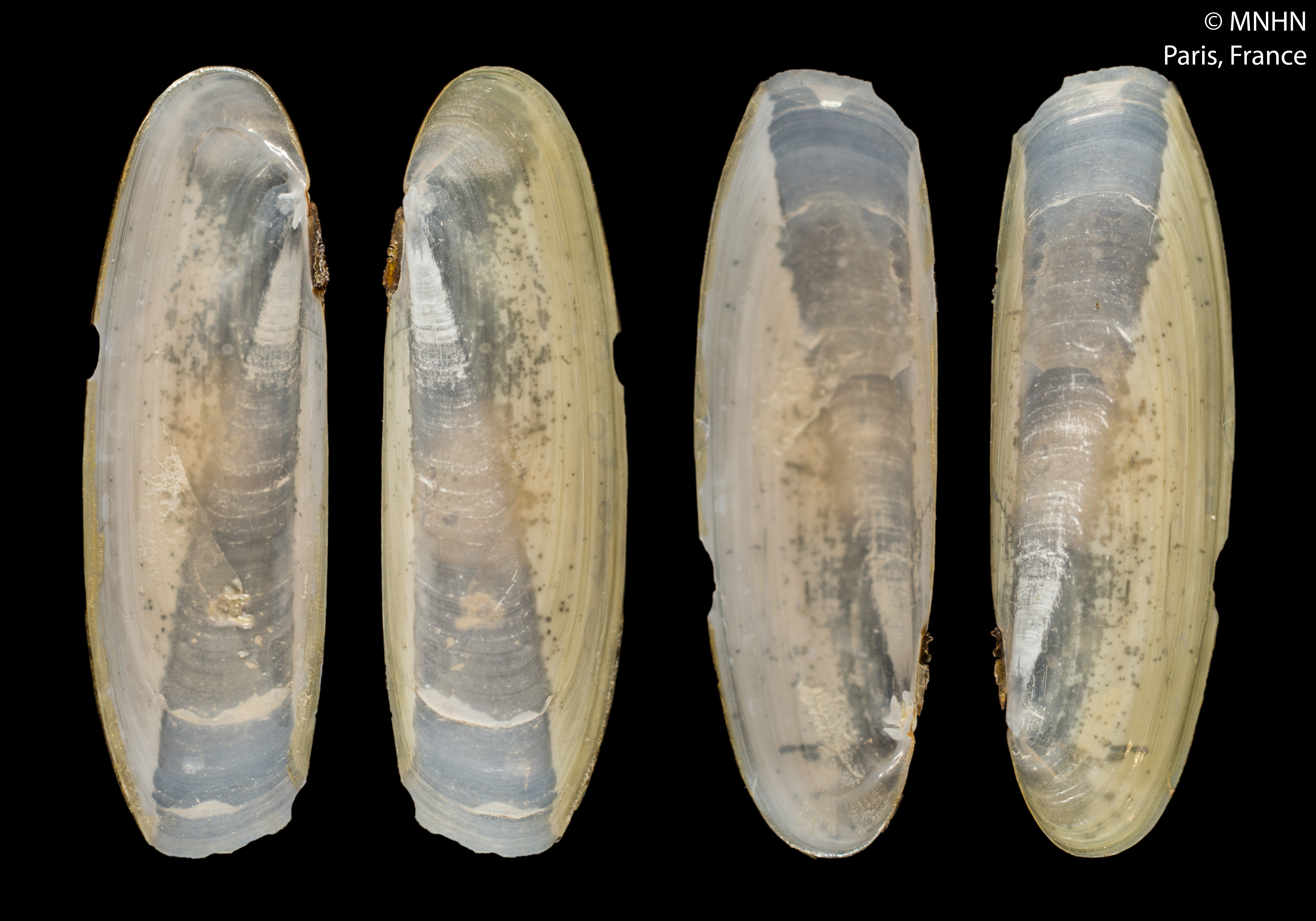
- Shell of Phaxas tenellus (holotype at MNHN, Paris)

Scientific classification
- Kingdom: Animalia
- Phylum: Mollusca
- Class: Bivalvia
- Order: Adapedonta
- Superfamily: Solenoidea
- Family: Pharidae
- Genus: Phaxas; Leach in Gray, 1852

Species
- See text

Synonyms
- Cultellus (Cultrensis) Coen, 1933; Cultrensis Coen, 1933; Phaxas (Phaxas) Leach in Gray, 1852; Phaxus [sic] (misspelling)

= Phaxas =

Genus of bivalves

Phaxas is a genus of small razor shells in the family Pharidae. Members of the genus have a pair of elongate valves and live in soft sediments on the sea bed. They have a muscular foot with which they can dig rapidly and a short siphon which they extend to the surface of the substrate. They are suspension feeders.

== Species ==
The following species are recognised:

- Phaxas pellucidus (Pennant, 1777)
- Phaxas tenellus Cosel, 1993

Species brought into synonymy:

- Phaxas adriaticus (Coen, 1933): synonym of Phaxas pellucidus (Pennant, 1777)
- Phaxas cultellus (Linnaeus, 1758): synonym of Ensiculus cultellus (Linnaeus, 1758)
- Phaxas decipiens (E. A. Smith, 1904) accepted as Afrophaxas decipiens (E. A. Smith, 1904)
