= Petta (annelid) =

Scientific classification
- Kingdom: Animalia
- Phylum: Annelida
- Clade: Pleistoannelida
- Clade: Sedentaria
- Order: Terebellida
- Family: Pectinariidae
- Genus: Petta; Malmgren, 1866

Species
- 8, see text

Genus of annelids

Petta is a genus in the polychaete family Pectinariidae.

== Systematics ==
There are currently eight recognized species in the genus

- Petta alissoni - Nogueira, Ribeiro, Carrerette & Hutchings, 2019
- Petta assimilis - McIntosh, 1885
- Petta brevis - Zhang & Hutchings, 2021
- Petta investigatoris - Zhang, Hutchings & Kupriyanova, 2019
- Petta pellucida - (Ehlers, 1887)
- Petta pusilla - Malmgren, 1866
- Petta tenuis - Caullery, 1944
- Petta williamsonae - Zhang, Hutchings & Kupriyanova, 2019
