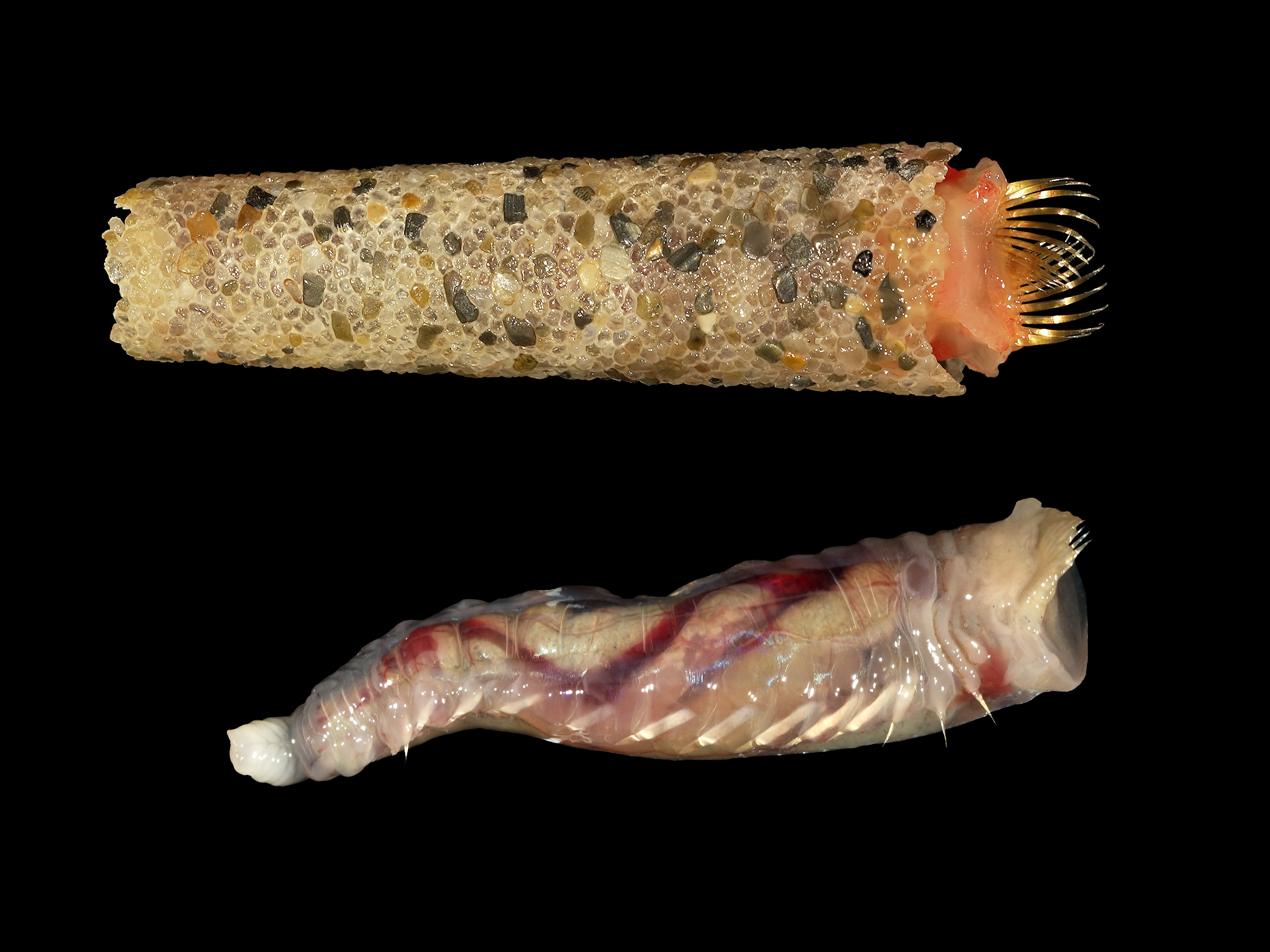
- Image of lagis koreni with and without tube

Scientific classification
- Kingdom: Animalia
- Phylum: Annelida
- Clade: Pleistoannelida
- Clade: Sedentaria
- Order: Terebellida
- Family: Pectinariidae
- Genus: Lagis; Malmgren, 1866

= Lagis =

Genus of annelids

Lagis is a genus of annelids belonging to the family Pectinariidae.

The genus has almost cosmopolitan distribution.

Species:

- Lagis abranchiata (Fauvel, 1932)
- Lagis australis (Ehlers, 1904)
- Lagis bocki (Hessle, 1917)
- Lagis crenulatus Sun & Qiu, 2012
- Lagis hupferi (Nilsson, 1928)
- Lagis koreni Malmgren, 1866
- Lagis neapolitana (Claparède, 1869)
- Lagis plurihamus Choi, Jung & Yoon, 2017
- Lagis portus Zhang & Hutchings, 2019
- Lagis pseudokoreni (Day, 1955)
- Lagis tenera Hartmann-Schröder, 1959
