= Amphictene =

Scientific classification
- Domain: Eukaryota
- Kingdom: Animalia
- Phylum: Annelida
- Clade: Pleistoannelida
- Clade: Sedentaria
- Order: Terebellida
- Family: Pectinariidae
- Genus: Amphictene; Savigny, 1822

Synonyms
- Pectinaria (Amphictene) Savigny, 1822

Genus of polychaete worm

Amphictene is a genus of polychaete worms in the family Pectinariidae, first described by Marie Jules César Savigny in 1822. The type species is Amphitrite auricoma Müller, 1776, currently accepted as Amphictene auricoma (O.F. Müller, 1776).

== Species ==
Species accepted on WoRMS as of October 2023 are:

- Amphictene alata Zhang, Zhang & Qiu, 2015
- Amphictene auricoma (O.F. Müller, 1776)
- Amphictene capensis (Pallas, 1766)
- Amphictene catharinensis (Grube, 1870)
- Amphictene cercusa Zhang & Hutchings, 2019
- Amphictene crassa (Grube, 1870)
- Amphictene favona Hutchings & Peart, 2002
- Amphictene guatemalensis (Nilsson, 1928)
- Amphictene helenae García-Garza & de Leon-Gonzalez, 2014
- Amphictene japonica (Nilsson, 1928)
- Amphictene jianqingi Zhang, Hutchings & Qiu, 2022
- Amphictene leioscapha (Caullery, 1944)
- Amphictene lizardensis Wong & Hutchings, 2015
- Amphictene moorei (Annenkova, 1929)
- Amphictene souriei (Fauvel, 1949)
- Amphictene undulata Zhang & Hutchings, 2019
- Amphictene uniloba Hutchings & Peart, 2002
