= Abra prismatica =

Scientific classification
- Kingdom: Animalia
- Phylum: Mollusca
- Class: Bivalvia
- Order: Cardiida
- Superfamily: Tellinoidea
- Family: Semelidae
- Genus: Abra
- Species: A. prismatica

Binomial name
- Abra prismatica (Montagu, 1808)

Synonyms
- Abra fragilis Risso, 1826; Abra milaschevichi Nevesskaja, 1963; Erycina aradae Biondi, 1859; Ligula prismatica Montagu, 1808; Psammotaea striata O. G. Costa, 1830; Syndesmya fragilis Milaschewitsch, 1916

Species of bivalve

Abra prismatica is a species of bivalve mollusc in the family Semelidae. It occurs in the northeastern Atlantic Ocean, the North Sea and the Mediterranean Sea, where it lives on the seabed, in shallow areas buried in soft sediment.

== Description ==
Abra prismatica grows to a length of about 13 cm (5 in). Each shell valve is fine and brittle, about twice as long as it is wide and oval or fusiform. It is sculptured with fine concentric lines, the chondrophore (pit to which the internal ligament is attached) points to the posterior. On the right valve are two small cardinal teeth in front of the chondrophore, and a single anterior and single posterior lateral teeth behind it. On the left valve there is a single small cardinal tooth and two small anterior and posterior laterals. The valves are shiny white both inside and out.

== Distribution ==
Abra prismatica is found on the coasts of northwest Europe, the North Sea and the Mediterranean Sea at depths down to about 100 m (330 ft). It is common around the British Isles and in the North Sea. It prefers fine, silty sand, but is also found in mud or gravel.

== Ecology ==
It shares this type of habitat in the North Sea with the amphipod Bathyporeia elegans, various polychaete worms, the brittlestar Amphiura filiformis and the cumacean crustacean Eudorellopsis deformis.
