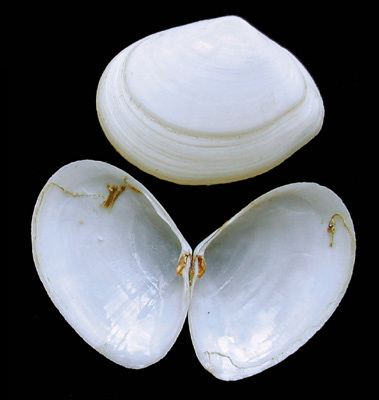

Scientific classification
- Kingdom: Animalia
- Phylum: Mollusca
- Class: Bivalvia
- Order: Cardiida
- Superfamily: Tellinoidea
- Family: Semelidae
- Genus: Abra
- Species: A. alba

Binomial name
- Abra alba (W.Wood, 1802)

Synonyms
- Amphidesma boysiana Leach in Gray, 1852; Erycina renieri Philippi, 1836; Erycina tumida Brusina, 1865; Mactra alba W. Wood, 1802; Mactra boysii Montagu, 1803; Syndosmya apelina Récluz, 1843; Syndosmya occitanica Récluz in Chenu, 1844; Tellina pellucida Brocchi, 1814; Tellina semidentata Scacchi, 1833

= Abra alba =

Species of bivalve

Abra alba, or the white furrow shell, is a species of bivalve mollusc in the family Semelidae. It occurs in the northeastern Atlantic Ocean and the Mediterranean Sea, where it lives on the floor in shallow areas buried in soft sediments.

== Description ==
Abra alba can grow to up to 2.5 cm (1 in) long but a more usual size is 1.5 centimetres. It has a pair of thin brittle valves that are translucent, semi-shiny and a dirty white colour with a pale brown periostracum. The shape is roughly oval and the posterior and anterior dorsal margins are almost straight and slope to rounded ends. Both margins are smooth and the anterior margin is a little longer than the posterior one. The valves have a sculpture of fine concentric lines and the growth stages of the animal are visible. The interior of the valves is somewhat glossy and the adductor muscle scars may be visible. The small brown ligament that holds the valves together is exterior.

== Distribution ==
Abra alba is found on the coasts of northwest Europe and the Mediterranean Sea at depths down to 200 m (656 ft). It is common around the British Isles and in the North Sea. It prefers fine, silty sand, but is also found in mud or gravel.

== Biology ==
Abra alba feeds by means of a pair of separate long, extensible siphons, elongations of the mantle. It is mostly a deposit feeder but is also able to feed on suspended particles as does the tellin Tellina fabula, a species with which it is often associated. The inhalant siphon gropes around widely over the surface of the substrate, actively drawing in detritus. In studies of Liverpool Bay, a community that includes A. alba, Phaxas pellucidus (the transparent razor shell) and Lagis koreni (the trumpet worm) is likely associated with more than one habitat.

A large number of very small eggs are produced from May to August. The larvae probably have a lengthy period as part of the zooplankton before settling out. Juveniles grow fast during the summer but the ones that settle in autumn seem to delay their further development until the following spring. The lifespan is usually one year but can extend to two.
