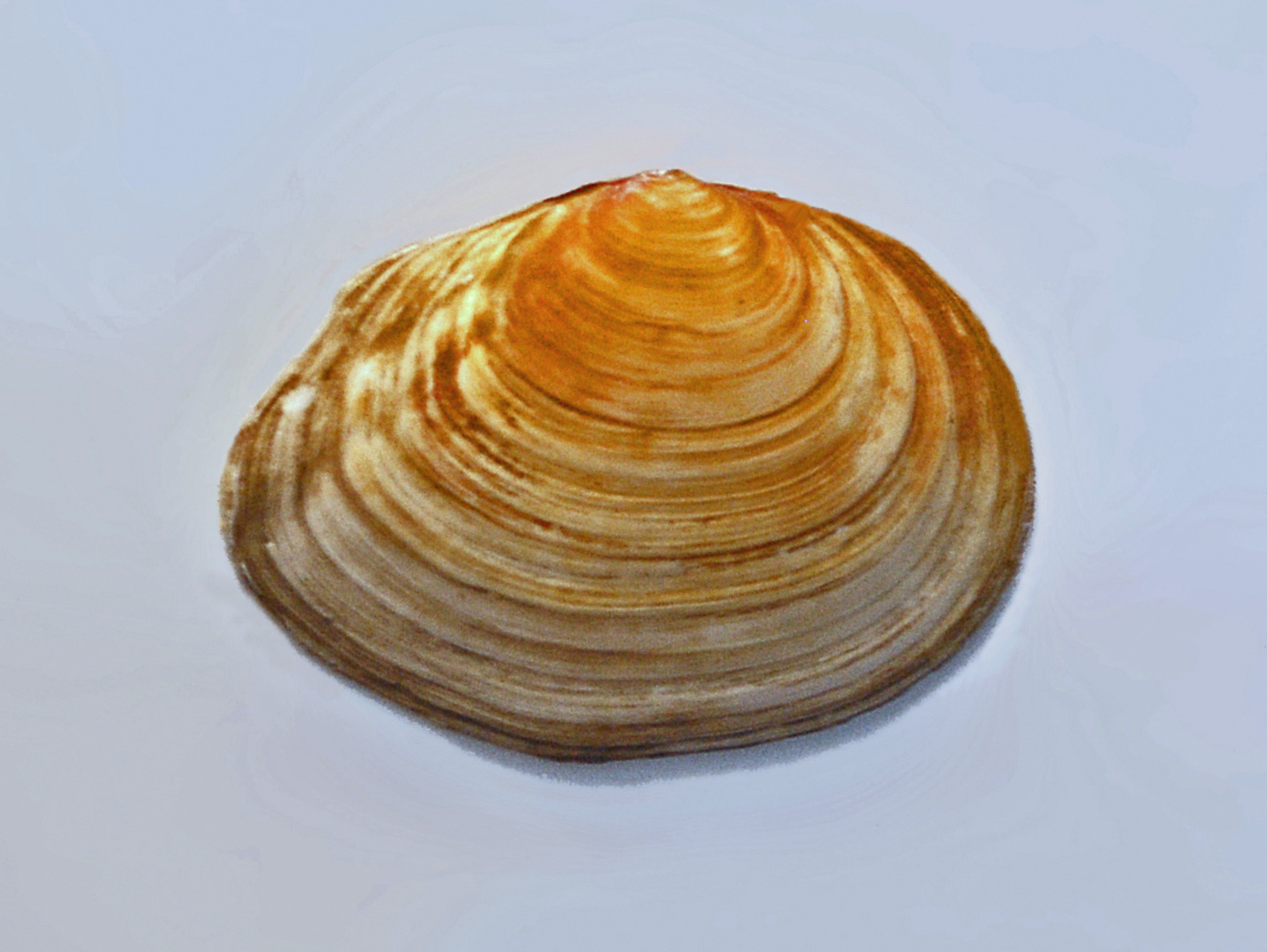
- Scrobicularia plana, on display at the Museo Civico di Storia Naturale di Milano

Scientific classification
- Domain: Eukaryota
- Kingdom: Animalia
- Phylum: Mollusca
- Class: Bivalvia
- Order: Cardiida
- Family: Semelidae
- Genus: Scrobicularia; Schumacher, 1815

Species
- See text

= Scrobicularia =

Scrobicularia Temporal range: Miocene–present, 5.332–0 Ma

Genus of bivalves

Scrobicularia is a genus of bivalve mollusc belonging to the family Semelidae. It is sometimes placed in its own family, Scrobicularidae.

== Species ==
There are two recognised species:

- Scrobicularia cottardi (Payraudeau, 1826)
- Scrobicularia plana (da Costa, 1778)

However, ITIS only recognizes Scrobicularia caduca. There are also names with uncertain status:

- Scrobicularia ceylonica E. A. Smith, 1896 – taxon inquirendum
- Scrobicularia caduca Gould, 1861 – nomen dubium
- Scrobicularia rubiginosa (Poli, 1795) – nomen dubium
