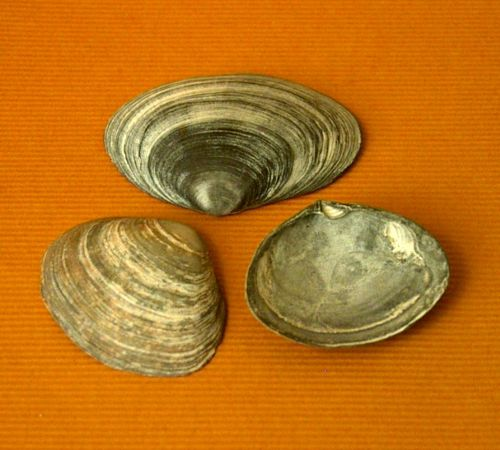
- Three valves of the peppery furrow shell, Scrobicularia plana

Scientific classification
- Kingdom: Animalia
- Phylum: Mollusca
- Class: Bivalvia
- Order: Cardiida
- Superfamily: Tellinoidea
- Family: Semelidae; Stoliczka, 1870

Genera
- See text.

= Semelidae =

Family of bivalves

The Semelidae are a family of saltwater clams, marine bivalve molluscs in the order Cardiida.

== Description ==
Members of this family have rounded or oval, elongated shells, much flattened. The two valves are connected by an internal ligament in contrast to the closely related family Tellinidae where the ligament is external. The two separate siphons are very long, sometimes several times the length of the shell. These siphons have a characteristic cruciform muscle at their base.

== Selected genera ==
Genera of Semelidae (with some notable species also listed) include:

- Abra Lamarck, 1818
  - Abra aequalis (Say, 1822)
  - Abra alba (Wood W., 1802)
  - Abra californica Kundsen, 1970
  - Abra lioica (Dall, 1881)
  - Abra longicallis Sacchi, 1836
  - Abra nitida (O. F. Mueller, 1776)
  - Abra pacifica Dall, 1915
  - Abra prismatica
  - Abra profundorum E. A. Smith, 1885
  - Abra tenuis (Montagu, 1818)
  - Abra tepocana Dall, 1915
- Argyrodonax Dall, 1911
- Cumingia G. B. Sowerby I, 1833
  - Cumingia californica Conrad, 1837
  - Cumingia coarctata G. B. Sowerby I, 1833
  - Cumingia tellinoides (Conrad, 1831)
- Ervilia Turton, 1822
  - Ervilia bisculpta Gould, 1861
  - Ervilia castanea (Montagu, 1803)
  - Ervilia concentrica (Holmes, 1860)
  - Ervilia nitens (Montagu, 1808)
  - Ervilia producta Odhner, 1922
  - Ervilia purpurea (Smith, 1906)
  - Ervilia scaliola
- Iacra H. Adams & A. Adams, 1856
- Leptomya A. Adams, 1864
  - Leptomya retiara aucklandica Powell
  - Leptomya retiara retiara (Hutton, 1885)
- Leptomyaria Habe, 1960
- Lonoa Dall, Bartsch & Rehder, 1938
- Montrouzieria Souverbie, 1863
- Rochefortina Dall, 1924
- Scrobicularia Schumacher, 1815
  - Scrobicularia plana – Peppery furrow shell
- Semele Schumacher, 1817
  - Semele bellastriata (Conrad, 1837)
  - Semele brambleyae (Powell, 1967)
  - Semele decisa (Conrad, 1837)
  - Semele incongrua Carpenter, 1864
  - Semele proficua (Pulteney, 1799)
  - Semele pulchra (G. B. Sowerby I, 1832)
  - Semele purpurascens (Gmelin, 1791)
  - Semele rubicola Dall, 1915
  - Semele rubropicta Dall, 1871
  - Semele rupicola Dall, 1915
  - Semele venusta (Reeve, 1853)
- Semelina Dall, 1900
  - Semelina nuculoides (Conrad, 1841)
- †Septeuilia Cossmann, 1913
- Souleyetia Récluz, 1869
- Theora H. Adams and A. Adams, 1856
  - Theora lubrica Gould, 1861
  - Theora mesopotamica Annandale 1918
- Thyellisca H. E. Vokes, 1956
