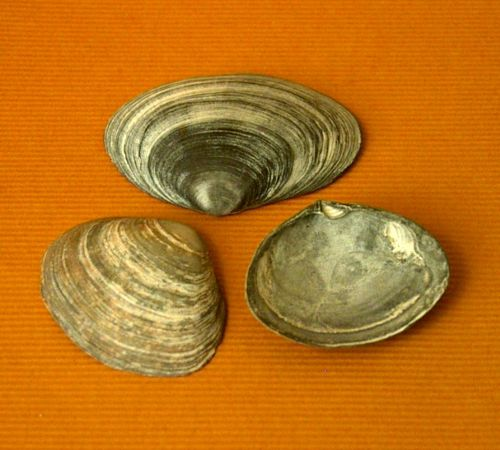

Scientific classification
- Kingdom: Animalia
- Phylum: Mollusca
- Class: Bivalvia
- Order: Cardiida
- Superfamily: Tellinoidea
- Family: Semelidae
- Genus: Scrobicularia
- Species: S. plana

Binomial name
- Scrobicularia plana (da Costa, 1778)

Synonyms
- Trigonella plana da Costa, 1778

= Scrobicularia plana =

Peppery furrow shell

Species of bivalve

Scrobicularia plana, the peppery furrow shell, is a bivalve mollusc belonging to the family Semelidae.

== Taxonomy ==
Although Scrobicularia plana is the only species currently recognized by ITIS in the genus Scrobicularia; World Register of Marine Species recognises another species, Scrobicularia cottardi as well as some nomen dubia, as does the BioLib.

The genus Scrobicularia is sometimes placed as the sole genus in a family, Scrobicularidae. It is now often placed instead in the related family Semelidae, as shown in the infobox. However this placement may change as molecular systematics provides new insights into the cladistics of the bivalves.

== Description ==
The shell can be anything from white through yellowish to a pale brownish-grey in colour, up to 6.5 cm in diameter. Its interior is nacreous and white or yellowish in colour. The shell is thin but quite deep, with circular closely packed growth ridges.

It is a filter feeder, with long siphons, burying itself up to 20 cm deep in sand or mud. When buried, it leaves star-shaped markings on the surface, and specimens can be found by looking for these. If the siphons are browsed by fish or other predators, they regenerate in a few days.

Right and left valve of the same specimen:
White form

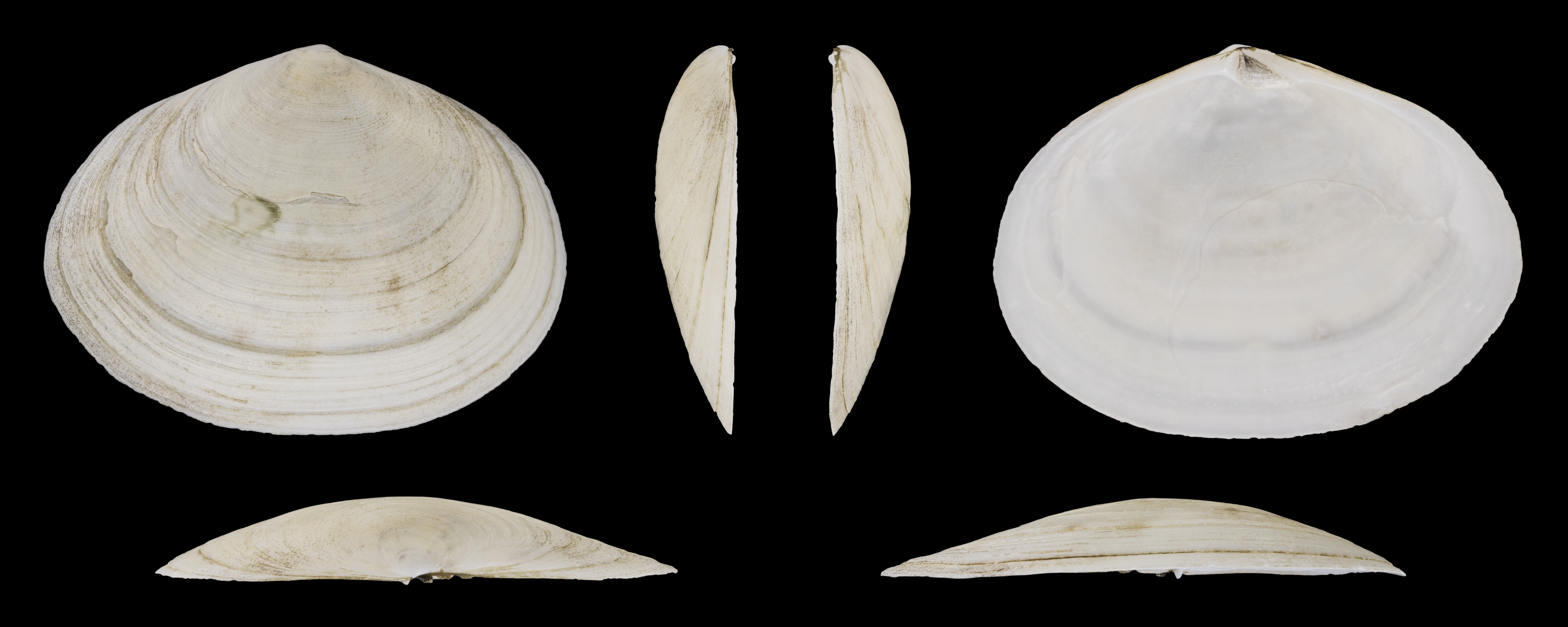
Right valve

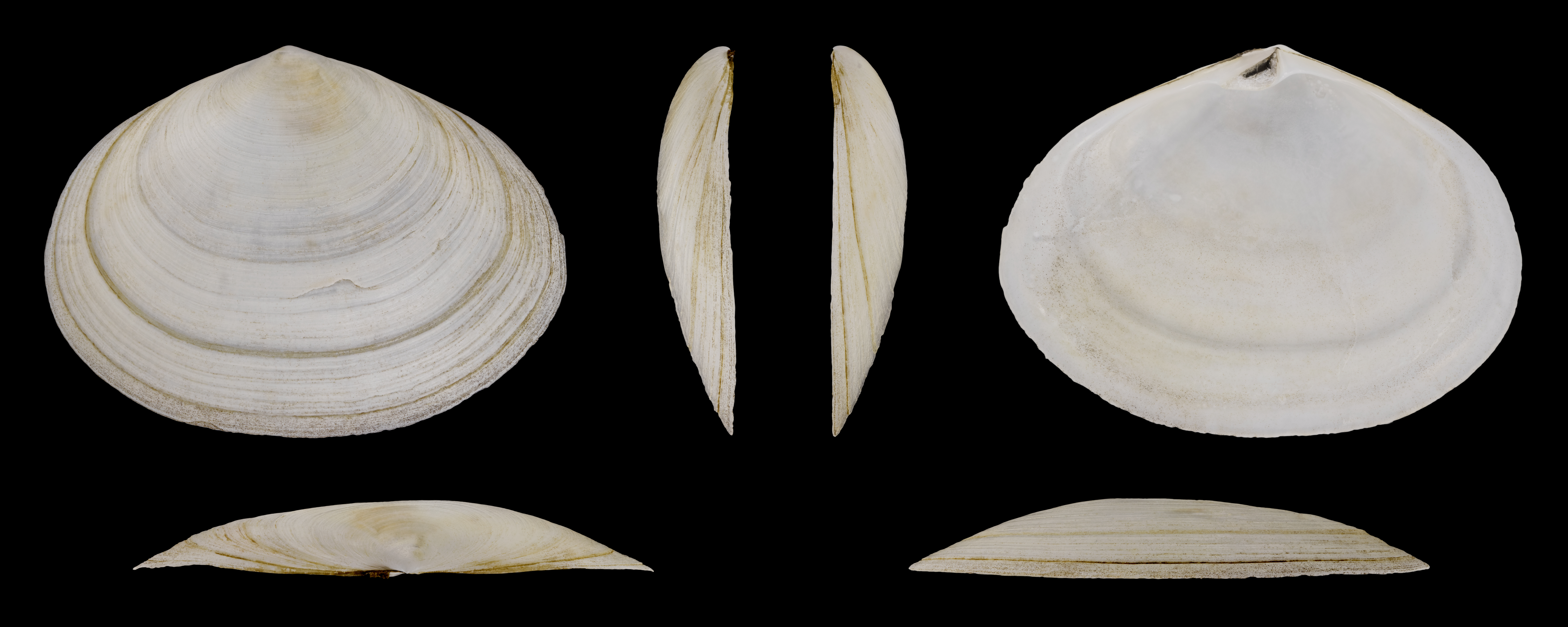
Left valve

Yellow form

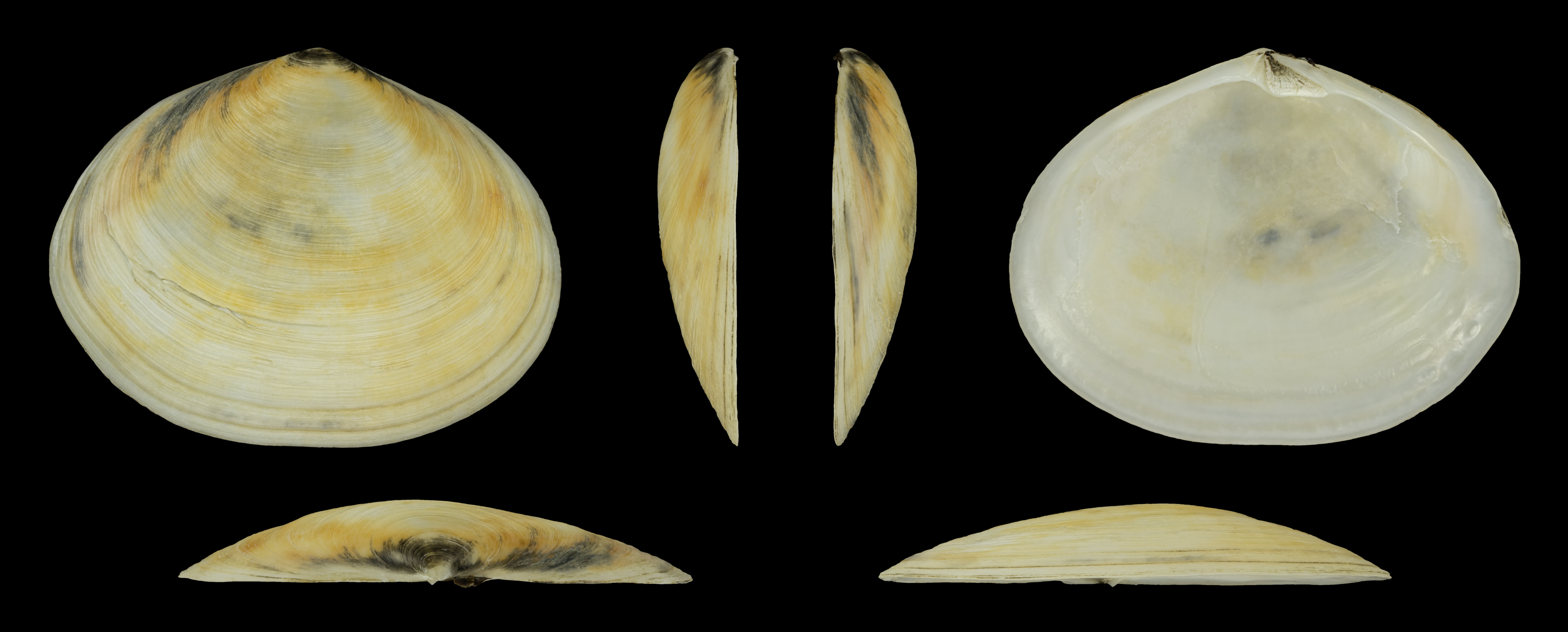
Right valve

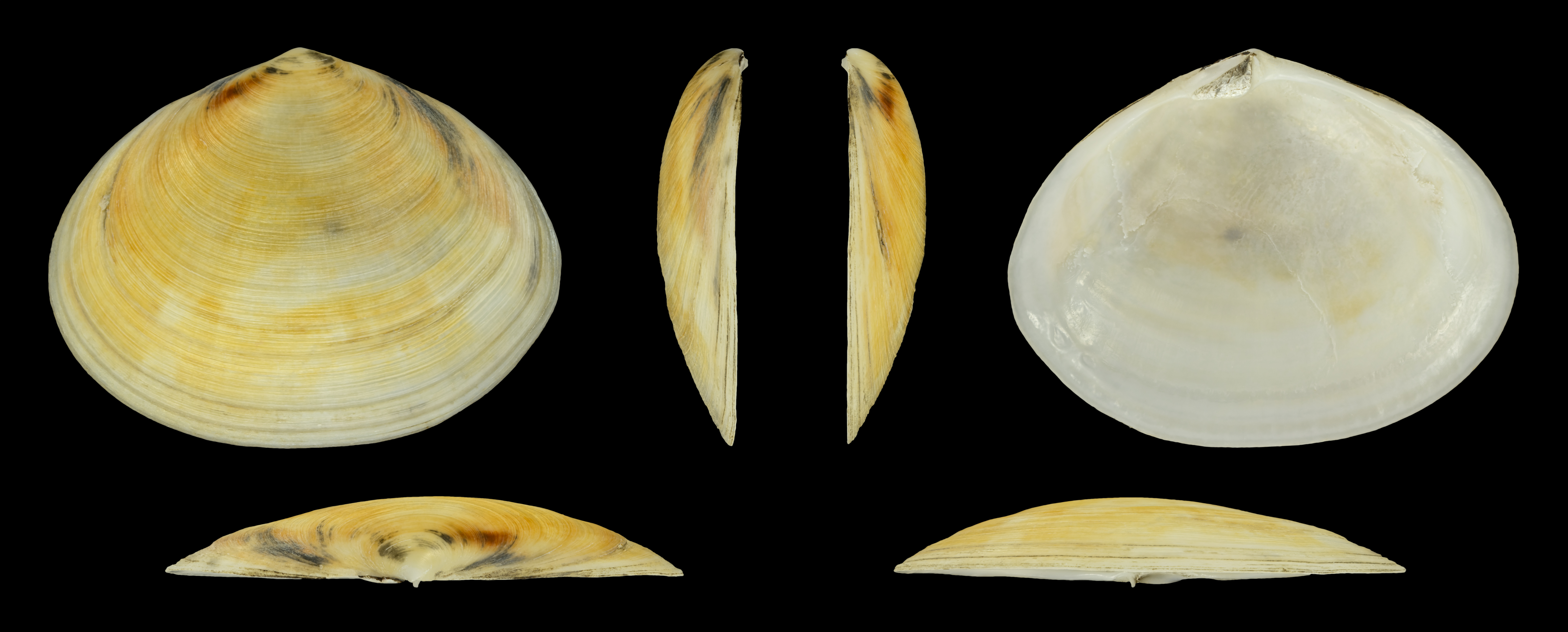
Left valve

== Distribution and habitat ==
This species is commonly found at quite high densities on sandy or muddy sea coasts and estuaries in northern Europe, the Mediterranean and West Africa.

== Commercial use ==
The peppery furrow shell is edible and can be found in some fish shops in France, where they are called lavignons.
