= Robert Parr Whitfield =

American invertebrate paleontologist and curator

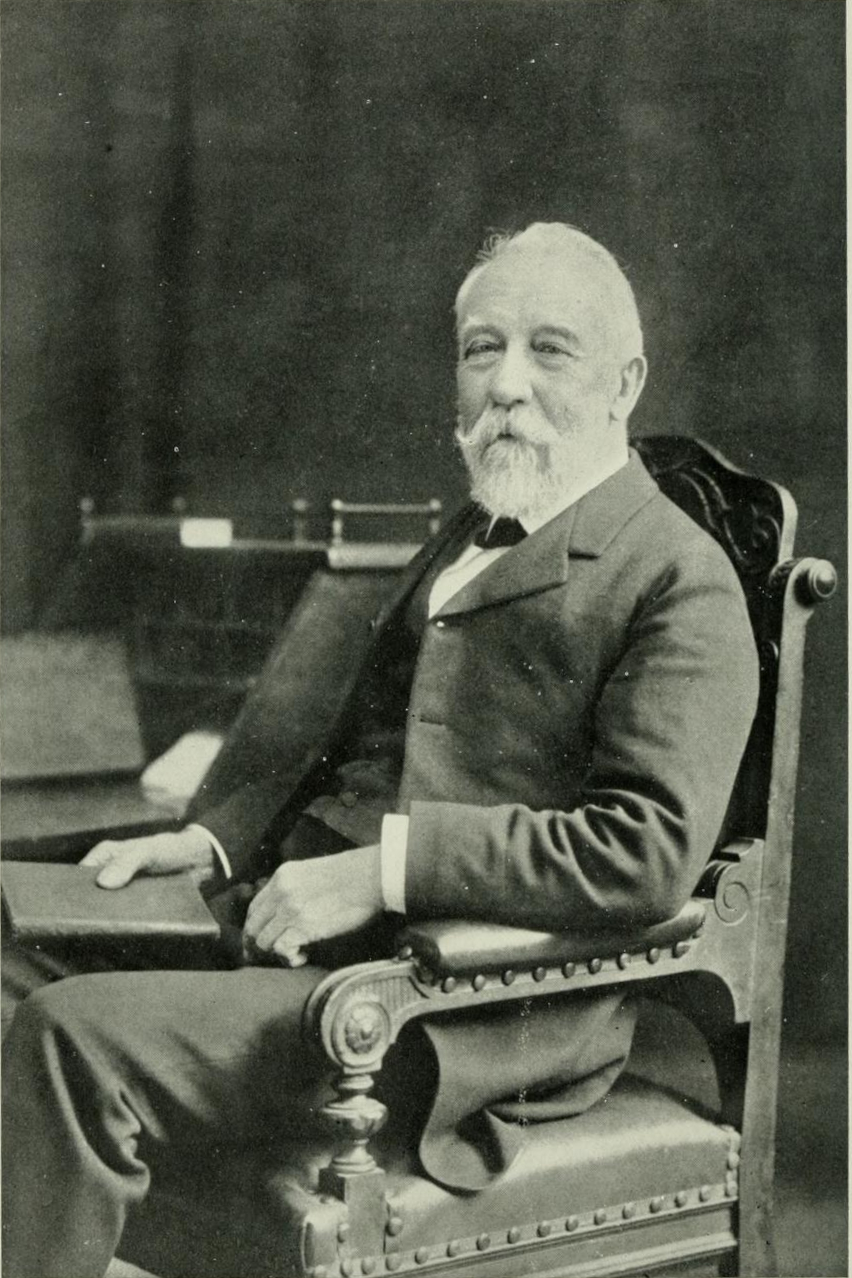

Robert Parr Whitfield (27 May 1828 – 6 April 1910) was an American invertebrate paleontologist and a curator of geology at the American Museum of Natural History. Largely self-educated Whitfield rose into paleontology as an assistant of James Hall and was known for his careful illustrations and descriptions.

== Biography ==
Whitfield was born in Willowvale, New York. His father William Fenton from England was a manufacturer of spindles for mills and young Whitfield had been initiated into skills in dealing with materials and manufacturing. His interest in nature was sparked as a child by an uneducated girl who was taking care of him and other children, taking them on walks into the woods to observe nature. From 1835 to 1840, the family moved back to England where young Whitfield would see and collect fossils from a nearby clay bank. The family returned to America and moved to a farm at Osceola where Whitfield worked with a Mr Chubbock who was involved in manufacturing scientific instruments. He also made use of the library of the Stockport Sunday School. He attended the meetings of the Utica Society of Naturalists. He examined the collections of Colonel Ezekiel Jewett and helped identify the molluscs. Jewett brought Whitfield to meet James Hall in Albany and this led Whitfield to work on his cabinet from 1850. He also began to illustrate fossils for the Paleontological Survey. He lectured on behalf of Hall at the Rensselaer Polytechnic Institute between 1872 and 1875 and after Hall's retirement, served there as a professor of geology. In 1876 he moved from Albany to the American Museum of Natural History, to which Hall's fossil collection had moved and where he became curator of geology. In 1898, he was elected to the American Philosophical Society.
