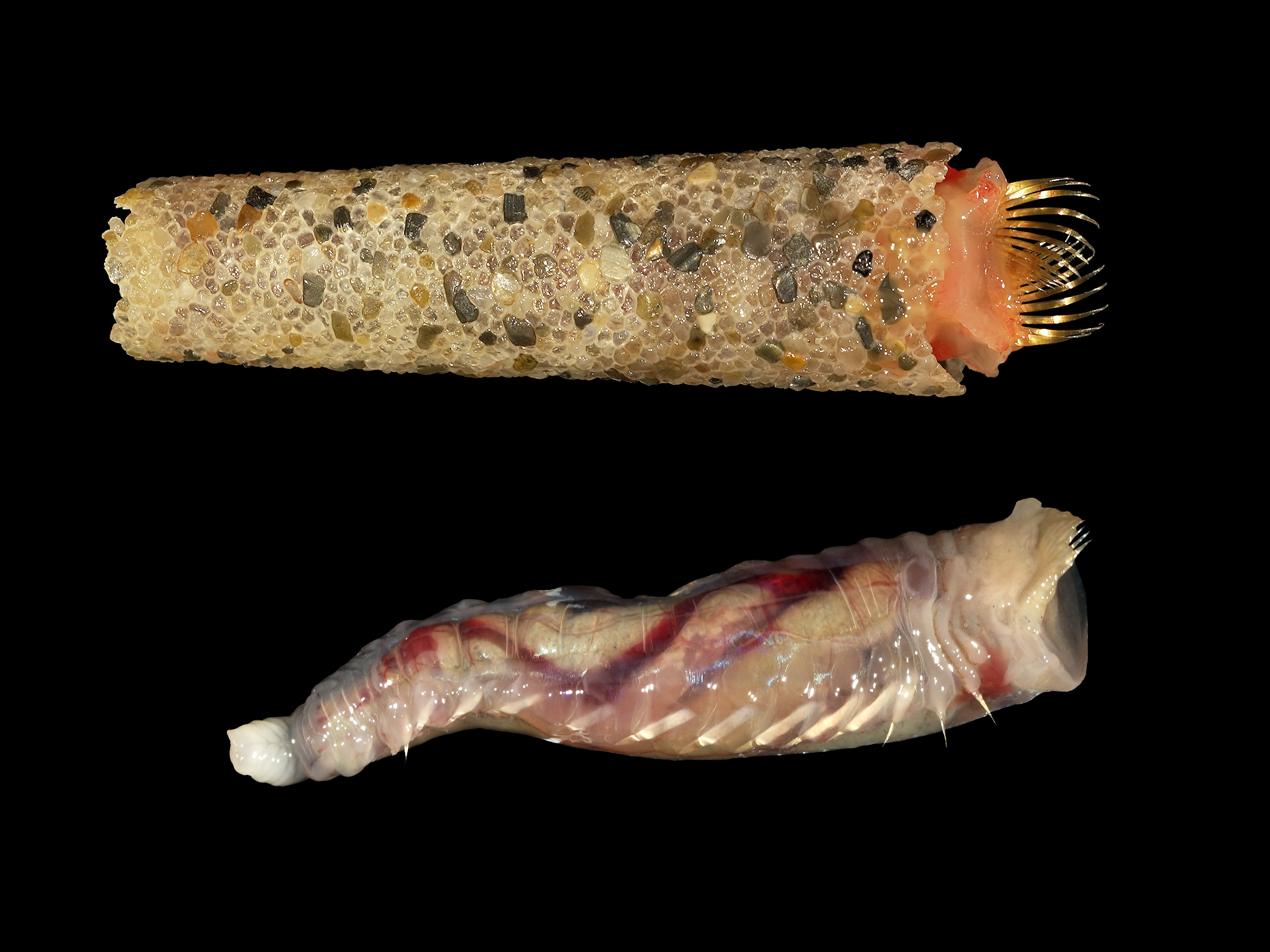
- Lagis koreni inside and out of its tube. Head is to the right.

Scientific classification
- Kingdom: Animalia
- Phylum: Annelida
- Clade: Pleistoannelida
- Clade: Sedentaria
- Order: Terebellida
- Family: Pectinariidae; Quatrefages, 1866

Genera
- 2-5, see text

= Pectinariidae =

Pectinariidae Temporal range: Jurassic–Holocene

Family of annelids

Pectinariidae, or the trumpet worms or ice cream cone worms, are a family of marine polychaete worms that build tubes using grains of sand roughly resembling ice cream cones or trumpets. These structures can be up to 5 centimetres (2 in) long. The earliest pectinariid fossils are known either from the Cretaceous or from the Middle Jurassic.

== Ecology ==
Pectinariids are sessile burrowing tube dwellers, which can be found in fine-grained sediment. They position the wider end of their tube downwards, and use their stout golden setae for digging while they use tentacles for sorting the particles which they ingest. Half of the particles which the worm digs through are excreted as pseudofaeces.

== Genera ==
The systematics of the pectinariids have been the subject of some debate. Previously, only two genera have been recognized, but three subgenera have been elevated to full genera by some scholars.

- Amphictene Savigny, 1818 - sometimes included as subgenus in Pectinaria
- Cistenides Malmgren, 1866 - sometimes included as subgenus in Pectinaria
- Lagis Malmgren, 1866 - sometimes included as subgenera in Pectinaria
- Pectinaria Savigny, 1818
- Petta Malmgren, 1866
