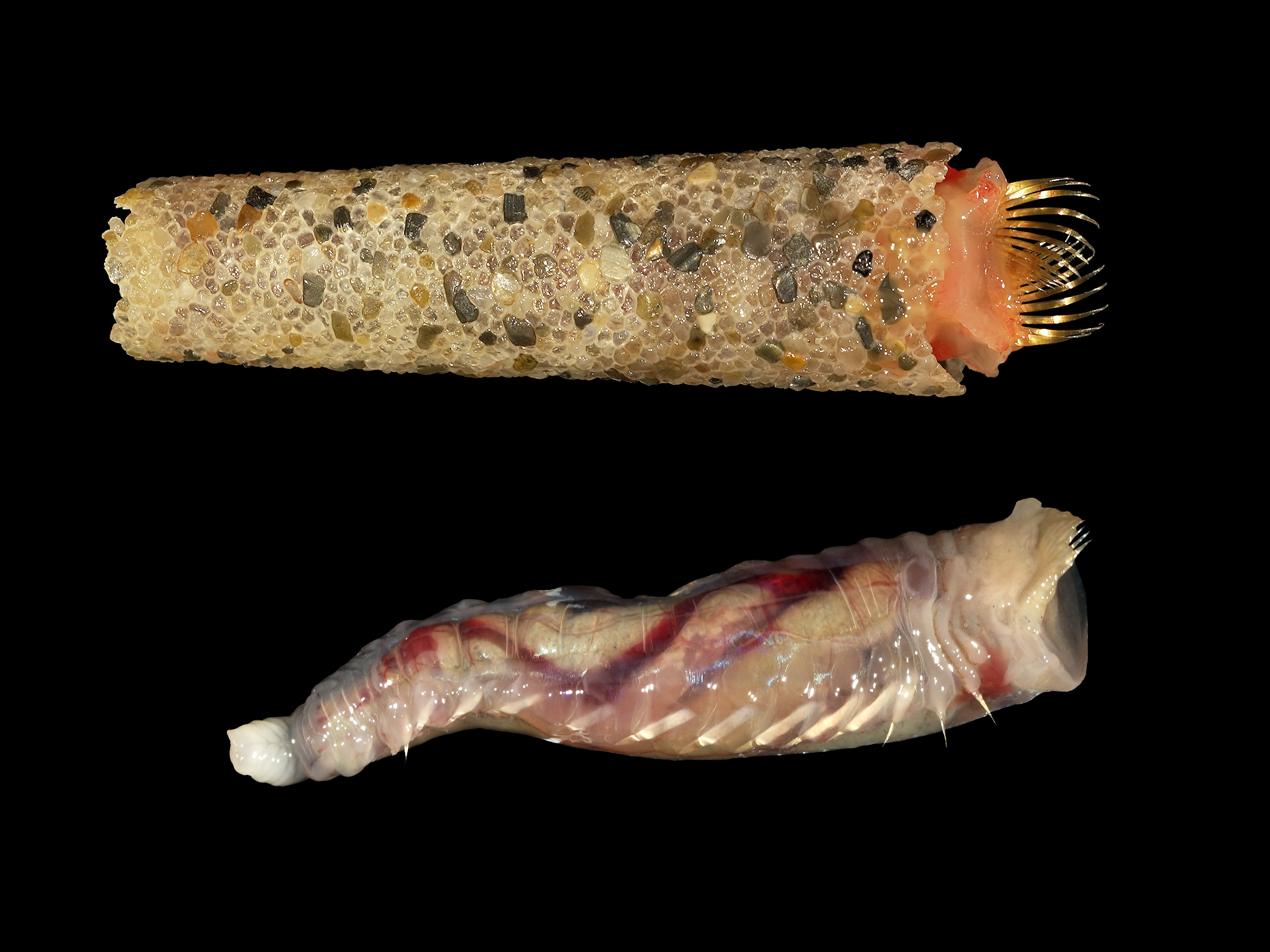
- Pectinaria koreni

Scientific classification
- Kingdom: Animalia
- Phylum: Annelida
- Clade: Pleistoannelida
- Clade: Sedentaria
- Order: Terebellida
- Family: Pectinariidae
- Genus: Pectinaria; Savigny in Lamarck, 1818

Species
- See text.

= Pectinaria (annelid) =

Genus of annelids

Pectinaria is a genus of sand tube-building annelid fanworms in the family Pectinariidae. One species, Pectinaria kiiensis, based on fossils from Japan is now considered a nomen dubium.

== Species ==
Species within this genus include:

- Pectinaria aegyptia (Savigny, 1822)
- Pectinaria antipoda Schmarda, 1861
- Pectinaria belgica (Pallas, 1766)
- Pectinaria bifurcata Blainville, 1828
- Pectinaria brevispinis Grube, 1878
- Pectinaria californiensis Hartman, 1941
- Pectinaria carnosa Wong & Hutchings, 2015
- Pectinaria chilensis Nilsson, 1928
- Pectinaria clava Grube, 1878
- Pectinaria conchilega Grube, 1878
- Pectinaria dimai Zachs, 1933
- Pectinaria dodeka Hutchings & Peart, 2002
- Pectinaria gouldii (Verrill, 1873)
- Pectinaria hartmanae (Reish, 1968)
- Pectinaria hiuchiensis Kitamori, 1965
- Pectinaria incerta (Chenu, 1842)
- Pectinaria kanabinos Hutchings & Peart, 2002
- Pectinaria kiiensis Katto, 1977
- Pectinaria nana Wesenberg-Lund, 1949
- Pectinaria ningalooensis Zhang & Hutchings, 2019
- Pectinaria nonatoi Nogueira, Ribeiro, Carrerette & Hutchings, 2019
- Pectinaria okudai (Imajima & Hartman, 1964)
- Pectinaria panava Willey, 1905
- Pectinaria papillosa Caullery, 1944
- Pectinaria parvibranchis Grube, 1878
- Pectinaria profunda Caullery, 1944
- Pectinaria regalis Verrill, 1901
- Pectinaria torquata Zhang & Qiu, 2017
