= Chaetopterus brevis =

Scientific classification
- Kingdom: Animalia
- Phylum: Annelida
- Family: Chaetopteridae
- Genus: Chaetopterus
- Species: C. brevis

Binomial name
- Chaetopterus brevis Lespés, 1872

Species of annelid worm

Chaetopterus brevis is a species of parchment worm, a marine polychaete in the family Chaetopteridae.

== Distribution ==
Chaetopterus brevis is endemic to the Mediterranean Sea.

== Taxonomy ==
Chaetopterus brevis was considered a junior synonym of C. variopedatus by Fauvel (1927), but it is now recognized as a distinct species.
