= Chaetopterus capensis =

Scientific classification
- Kingdom: Animalia
- Phylum: Annelida
- Family: Chaetopteridae
- Genus: Chaetopterus
- Species: C. capensis

Binomial name
- Chaetopterus capensis Stimpson, 1855

Synonyms
- C. hamatus Schmarda, 1861

Species of annelid worm

Chaetopterus capensis is a species of parchment worm, a marine polychaete in the family Chaetopteridae.

== Taxonomy ==
Chaetopterus capensis was formerly synonymized with C. variopedatus, but is now recognized as a distinct species.
