= Chaetopterus pugaporcinus =

Scientific classification
- Kingdom: Animalia
- Phylum: Annelida
- Family: Chaetopteridae
- Genus: Chaetopterus
- Species: C. pugaporcinus

Binomial name
- Chaetopterus pugaporcinus Osborn, 2007

Species of annelid worm

Chaetopterus pugaporcinus, commonly known as the pigbutt worm or flying buttocks, is a species of worm first described by scientists at the Monterey Bay Aquarium Research Institute in 2007. The worm is round in shape, approximately 10 to 20 millimeters in length (roughly the size of a hazelnut), and bears a strong resemblance to a disembodied pair of buttocks. Because of this, it was given a Latin species name that roughly translates to "resembling a pig's rear."

The worm has been observed residing just below the oxygen minimum zone (OMZ) between 875 and 1,200 meters (2,871 and 3,937 ft) deep — even when the sea floor is significantly deeper. The worms are neutrally buoyant, and have been observed floating along with their mouth parts facing downward, and their hind parts towards the ocean surface. As these worms have shown no ability to swim or otherwise propel themselves through the water, and have no long, protruding appendages to catch prey with, they must rely on filter feeding to survive. Current hypotheses suggest that they reside in the oxygen minimum zone because of its cornucopia of detritus and marine snow, and that the worms produce clouds of mucus to capture particles of food and "snow," which they later draw into their mouths and ingest. C. pugaporcinus has been found to feed mainly on pelagic phytoplankton, as well as pelagic foraminiferans, silicoflagellates, dinoflagellates, and marine protists.

The worm has a segmented body, but the middle segments are highly inflated, giving the animal a round shape. These morphological characteristics are unique among chaetopterids. It is unknown whether the specimens found to date were adult or larval forms. As chaetopterid worms do not spend a predetermined amount of time as planktonic larva, it is possible that the specimens found were actually larva that had simply been unable to settle in an appropriate benthic habitat for their species. Their unusual size (five to ten times larger than any known chaetopterid larvae) might indicate they were adults, but all currently known species of chaetopterid adults prefer to live in the benthic environment, and live in parchment-like tubes on the sea floor. Comparison to larval morphology has indicated that the specimens have a close relationship to either genus Chaetopterus or genus Mesochaetopterus, and a phylogenetic tree constructed from mitochondrial and ribosomal DNA sequences from twelve different Chaetopteridae worms found them to be most closely related to other worms of the genus Chaetopterus.

In laboratory settings, C. pugaporcinus has been found to produce bioluminescence when physically stimulated. This bioluminescence is produced as a bright blue light that endures for 3 to 6 seconds. Additionally, the worm will produce very small bioluminescent green particles that are dispersed into its mucous cloud, and glow for 1 to 2 seconds before fading.
