= Chaetopterus norvegicus =

Scientific classification
- Kingdom: Animalia
- Phylum: Annelida
- Family: Chaetopteridae
- Genus: Chaetopterus
- Species: C. norvegicus

Binomial name
- Chaetopterus norvegicus M. Sars, 1835

Species of annelid worm

Chaetopterus norvegicus is a species of parchment worm, a marine polychaete in the family Chaetopteridae.

It is found in the North Sea and Arctic waters around Norway and the west coast of Sweden at depths of 30 to 550 m (100 to 1,800 ft).

== Taxonomy ==
Chaetopterus norvegicus was formerly synonymized with C. variopedatus, but Moore et al. (2020) recognized it as a distinct species.
