= Chaetopterus luteus =

Scientific classification
- Kingdom: Animalia
- Phylum: Annelida
- Family: Chaetopteridae
- Genus: Chaetopterus
- Species: C. luteus

Binomial name
- Chaetopterus luteus Stimpson, 1855

Species of annelid worm

Chaetopterus luteus is a species of parchment worm, a marine polychaete in the family Chaetopteridae.

== Taxonomy ==
Chaetopterus luteus was formerly synonymized with C. variopedatus, but is now recognized as a distinct species.
