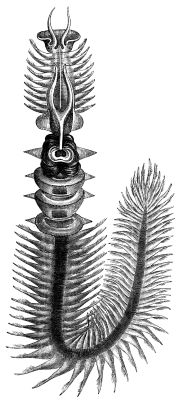
- Chaetopterus sp.
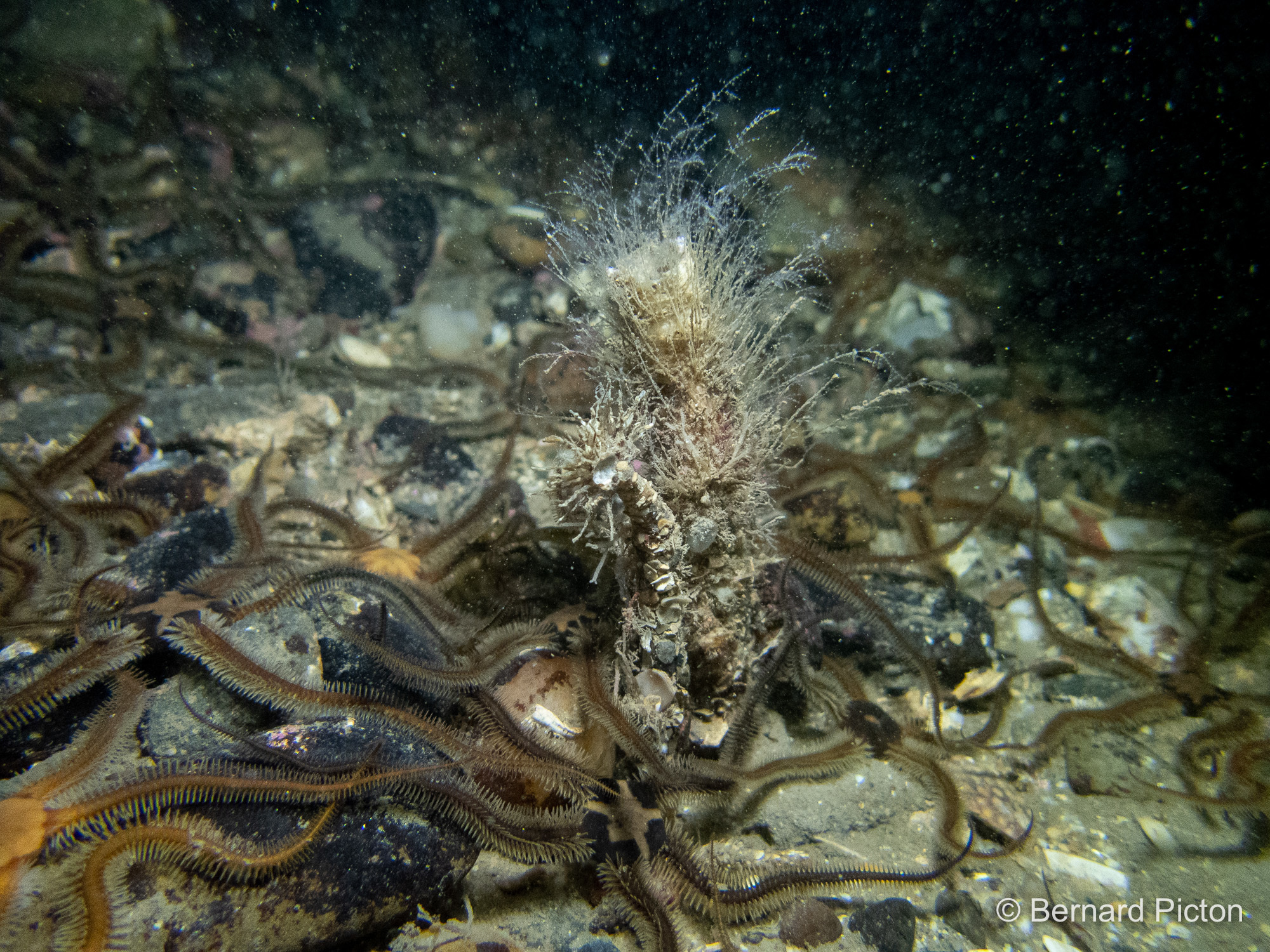
- Photo of Chaetopterus variopedatus (smaller Lanice conchilega in front)

Scientific classification
- Kingdom: Animalia
- Phylum: Annelida
- Family: Chaetopteridae
- Genus: Chaetopterus; Cuvier, 1827

= Chaetopterus =

Genus of annelid worms

Chaetopterus or the parchment worm or parchment tube worm is a genus of marine polychaete worm that lives in a tube it constructs in sediments or attaches to a rocky or coral reef substrate. The common name arises from the parchment-like appearance of the tubes that house these worms. Parchment tube worms are filter feeders and spend their adult lives in their tubes, unless the tube is damaged or destroyed. They are planktonic in their juvenile forms, as is typical for polychaete annelids. Species include the recently discovered deep water Chaetopterus pugaporcinus and the well-studied Chaetopterus variopedatus.

== Housing tubes ==
The tubes the worms live in are either attached to rocks, or, more commonly, buried in sandy bottoms in shallow waters. The worm has spines along its body segments that are modified for tunneling into the sandy substrate to create the u-shaped tube within which it lives. The tubes are upright u-shaped tunnels lined with mucous, then the parchment tube, with the worm living inside the parchment tube. Each parchment tube ends with a chimney of parchment that juts above the substrate. The tubes can be as long as 85 centimeters and up to 4 centimeters in diameter at the widest portion in the buried central part of the tube. The chimneys may be wider or much narrower than the rest of the tube.

== Worm morphology ==
The worms are unique among the polychaete worms in the highly derived parapodia of the mid-segments of its body that are used in its specialized filter feeding regime. The worm's parapodia are modified into the shape of fans and used to create suction and pump water through the worm's parchment living tube. The morphology of the structures are used in identifying species. The worm feeds by using modified structures on its midbody segments that create mucus nets to trap food passed through the net. A flow of water containing plankton and organic debris is created by "circular flaps" on three segments that create suction that draws water through the living tube.

== Bioluminescence ==
Members of the genus have no organs for detecting light and live their entire adult lives in their buried tubes. In spite of this, known members of the genera exhibit strong bioluminescence. When the worm is disturbed in its home it moves to the end of the tube away from the disturbance and near the disturbance it emits its feeding mucus with crystals that exhibit blue luminescence.

== Commensal animals ==
Two species of filter-feeding crustaceans from different families may make their homes in the Chaetopterus tube, Polyonyx gibbesi (family Porcellanidae) and Pinnixa chaetopterana (family Pinnotheridae); while a third species, Tumidotheres maculatus is known to sometimes inhabit the tubes. Polyonyx and Pinnixa are almost always present in the tubes, generally as a pair of crabs, and both species may inhabit the tubes at the same time. However, breeding pairs of either species do not share the tubes with adults of the other species. The crustaceans may live most of their lives in the tubes, leaving in the case of disturbance by exiting through the chimneys at either ends or, when the chimneys are too narrow, by biting through the parchment tube. A nudibranch, Tenellia chaetopterana also lives within the tubes of a species of Chaetopterus. It is hypothesised that this nudibranch feeds on the mucus net which Chaetopterus uses to trap its food or on the faeces of Chaetopterus. Tenellia rolleri is another nudibranch with similar flattened morphology which lives in muddy areas with no obvious food source, but abundant Chaetopterus tubes. It is possible that it lives and feeds in a similar manner.

== Species ==
The following species are assigned to this genus:

- Chaetopterus aduncus Nishi, Hickman & Bailey-Brock, 2009
- Chaetopterus antarcticus Kinberg, 1867
- Chaetopterus brevis Lespés, 1872
- Chaetopterus bruneli Moore, Gagnon & Petersen, 2020
- Chaetopterus capensis Stimpson, 1855
- Chaetopterus cautus Marenzeller, 1879
- Chaetopterus charlesdarwinii Nishi, Hickman & Bailey-Brock, 2009
- Chaetopterus dewysee Tilic & Rouse, 2020
- Chaetopterus djiboutiensis Gravier, 1906
- Chaetopterus galapagensis Nishi, Hickman & Bailey-Brock, 2009
- Chaetopterus gregarius Nishi, Arai & Sasanuma, 2000
- Chaetopterus izuensis Nishi, 2001
- Chaetopterus japonicus Nishi, 2001
- Chaetopterus kagosimensis Izuka, 1911
- Chaetopterus longipes Crossland, 1904
- Chaetopterus luteus Stimpson, 1855
- Chaetopterus macropus Schmarda, 1861
- Chaetopterus norvegicus M. Sars, 1835
- Chaetopterus pacificus Nishi, 2001
- Chaetopterus pergamentaceus Cuvier, 1830
- Chaetopterus pugaporcinus Osborn, Rouse, Goffredi & Robison, 2007
- Chaetopterus qiani Sun & Qiu, 2014
- Chaetopterus sarsii Boeck in Sars, 1861
- Chaetopterus takahashii Izuka, 1911
- Chaetopterus variopedatus (Renier, 1804)
