= Chaetopterus sarsii =

Scientific classification
- Kingdom: Animalia
- Phylum: Annelida
- Family: Chaetopteridae
- Genus: Chaetopterus
- Species: C. sarsii

Binomial name
- Chaetopterus sarsii Boeck , 1861

Species of annelid worm

Chaetopterus sarsii is a species of parchment worm, a marine polychaete in the family Chaetopteridae.

== Taxonomy ==
Genetic analysis by Moore et al. (2017) indicates that Chaetopterus sarsii is distinct from C. variopedatus.
