= Chaetopterus japonicus =

Scientific classification
- Kingdom: Animalia
- Phylum: Annelida
- Family: Chaetopteridae
- Genus: Chaetopterus
- Species: C. japonicus

Binomial name
- Chaetopterus japonicus Nishi, 2001

Species of annelid worm

Chaetopterus japonicus is a species of parchment worm, a marine polychaete in the family Chaetopteridae.

== Description and biology ==
Chaetopterus japonicus is distinguishable from other Chaetopterus species found in Japanese waters in being small (< 2 cm body length), and having characteristic ringed eyes. It inhabits U-shaped tubes.
