= Tumidotheres maculatus =

Scientific classification
- Kingdom: Animalia
- Phylum: Arthropoda
- Class: Malacostraca
- Order: Decapoda
- Suborder: Pleocyemata
- Infraorder: Brachyura
- Family: Pinnotheridae
- Genus: Tumidotheres
- Species: T. maculatus

Binomial name
- Tumidotheres maculatus (Say, 1818)

Synonyms
- Cancer parasiticus Linnaeus, 1763; Cancer pinnophylax Linnaeus, 1767; Pinnotheres maculatus Say, 1818

Species of crab

Tumidotheres maculatus is a species of crab that lives commensally or parasitically in the mantle cavity of molluscs. It is found along much of the western Atlantic Ocean and was first described by Thomas Say in 1818.

== Distribution ==
Tumidotheres maculatus has a wide range in the western Atlantic Ocean, extending from the seas of Martha's Vineyard (United States) to San Matías Gulf (Argentina).

== Description ==
There is conspicuous sexual dimorphism in T. maculatus which corresponds with the differing ecology of the two sexes. Males are typically less than 6 millimetres (0.24 in) in carapace width, and are able to leave the host. Females grow up to 16 mm (0.63 in) wide, and, having reached adulthood, spend their entire lives in the host.

== Ecology ==
Tumidotheres maculatus is an endosymbiont of molluscs; it is unclear whether the host is harmed by the crabs presence, that is whether the relationship is commensal or parasitic. It is associated with a wide range of mollusc hosts, most of which are bivalves. They include Argopecten irradians, Atrina rigida, Modiolus americanus, Mytilus edulis and Flexopecten felipponei. It has also been found in a tunicate of the genus Molgula, in the tubes of the tubeworm Chaetopterus variopedatus and on the asteroid (starfish) Asterias rubens.

In molluscan hosts, T. maculatus uses its legs to cling to the gills of its host, and feeds on strands of food aggregated by the host. Reported rates of infestation of T. maculatus on mollusc hosts vary widely, from 0%–20% on Argopecten irradians at St. Joseph Bay, Florida, to 97.6% on Mytilus edulis at Quicks Hole, Massachusetts.

== Taxonomy ==
Tumidotheres maculatus was first described by Thomas Say in 1818, under the name Pinnotheres maculatus. It was transferred to the new genus Tumidotheres, alongside T. margarita by Ernesto Campos in 1989. It may be the species referred to by Carl Linnaeus as Cancer parasiticus in his 1763 work Centuria Insectorum, and the one he called Cancer pinnophylax in the 1767 12th edition of Systema Naturae.
