= Chaetopterus antarcticus =

Scientific classification
- Kingdom: Animalia
- Phylum: Annelida
- Family: Chaetopteridae
- Genus: Chaetopterus
- Species: C. antarcticus

Binomial name
- Chaetopterus antarcticus Kinberg, 1866

Species of annelid worm

Chaetopterus antarcticus is a species of parchment worm, a marine polychaete in the family Chaetopteridae.
