= Chaetopterus qiani =

Scientific classification
- Kingdom: Animalia
- Phylum: Annelida
- Family: Chaetopteridae
- Genus: Chaetopterus
- Species: C. qiani

Binomial name
- Chaetopterus qiani Sun & Qiu, 2014

Species of annelid worm

Chaetopterus qiani is a species of parchment worm, a marine polychaete in the family Chaetopteridae.

== Distribution ==
Chaetopterus qiani is found in epibenthic sediments in Hong Kong.

== Description ==
Chaetopterus qiani differs from other Pacific species of Chaetopterus in having 9 chaetigers in region A, muddy eyes, and tubes, and neuropodia in region A9.
