= Chaetopterus pergamentaceus =

Scientific classification
- Kingdom: Animalia
- Phylum: Annelida
- Family: Chaetopteridae
- Genus: Chaetopterus
- Species: C. pergamentaceus

Binomial name
- Chaetopterus pergamentaceus Cuvier, 1830

Synonyms
- C. insignis Baird, 1864; C. valencinii Quatrefages, 1866

Species of annelid worm

Chaetopterus pergamentaceus is a species of parchment worm, a marine polychaete in the family Chaetopteridae.

== Taxonomy ==
Chaetopterus pergamentaceus was formerly synonymized with Chaetopterus variopedatus, but Moore et al. (2017) and Moore (2019) revalidated this species based on morphological and phylogenetic analysis.

== Distribution and biology ==
Chaetopterus pergamentaceus occurs in the intertidal and littoral zone in the North Atlantic.
