= Chaetopterus djiboutiensis =

Scientific classification
- Kingdom: Animalia
- Phylum: Annelida
- Family: Chaetopteridae
- Genus: Chaetopterus
- Species: C. djiboutiensis

Binomial name
- Chaetopterus djiboutiensis Gravier, 1906

Species of annelid worm

Chaetopterus djiboutiensis is a species of parchment worm, a marine polychaete in the family Chaetopteridae. It is endemic to Djibouti and the central to southern Red Sea.

== Taxonomy ==
Chaetopterus djiboutiensis was originally described as a variety of C. variopedatus, but recent study has demonstrated it to be a distinct species.
