= Chaetopterus takahashii =

Scientific classification
- Kingdom: Animalia
- Phylum: Annelida
- Family: Chaetopteridae
- Genus: Chaetopterus
- Species: C. takahashii

Binomial name
- Chaetopterus takahashii Izuka, 1911

Species of annelid worm

Chaetopterus takahashii is a species of parchment worm, a marine polychaete in the family Chaetopteridae.

== Description ==
Chaetopterus takahashii is distinguished by the higher number of chaetigers in region-A (12), the lack of eyes, and a larger body length (>1 foot).
