= Swima bombiviridis =

Scientific classification
- Kingdom: Animalia
- Phylum: Annelida
- Clade: Pleistoannelida
- Clade: Sedentaria
- Order: Terebellida
- Family: Acrocirridae
- Genus: Swima
- Species: S. bombiviridis

Binomial name
- Swima bombiviridis Osborn, Haddock, Pleijel, Madin & Rouse, 2009

Species of annelid

Swima bombiviridis is a worm species that lives in the deep ocean. It is also known as the green bomber worm or bombardier worm. This deep ocean pelagic (free-swimming) annelid has modified bioluminescent gills that can be cast off from an individual. These discarded gills somewhat resemble green "bombs" that remain illuminated for several seconds after they have been discarded. It is thought that this is a defensive mechanism rather than reproductive, as it is seen in both mature and juvenile individuals. This species was the first of its genus, Swima, to be discovered, and was the only one with a formal scientific name as of 2010. The genus name, Swima, is derived from the Latin, referring to the animal's ability to swim. The species name, bombiviridis, is derived from the Latin prefix bombus, meaning humming or buzzing (from which the English word bomb is derived), and the suffix viridis, which is Latin for the color green. Swima bombiviridis therefore translates to "swimming green bomber".

== Description ==
S. bombiviridis belongs to a clade that is morphologically distinct from other swimming acrocirrids by their transparent bodies, and single medial subulate branchiae. Acrocirridae is closely related to the Flabelligeridae. While species of Swima live in the ocean sediment, others remain suspended up to 444 meters above the sea floor. S. bombiviridis is further characterized by a gelatinous sheath and elliptical branchiae that it uses to drop 1mm long bioluminescent ‘bombs’ that luminesce for several seconds. They can grow over 30mm in length and 5 mm in width, making them relatively large in comparison to other acrocirrids. Acrocirridae contains 8 genera of tiny, benthic, sessile worms in addition to these pelagic forms.

=== Distribution and habitat ===
S. bombiviridis resides at depths up to 3600 meters and was first recorded off the coast of Monterey Bay, California. Since then, they have only been found between 1–450 meters above the sea floor. They are holopelagic, which means they remain pelagic throughout their entire life cycle, existing exclusively in the water column.

The worms are not uncommon; they travel in groups by the hundreds, however, the remoteness of their habitat renders them incredibly challenging to investigate. Greg Rouse notes that each of the seven species in its clade exhibits various intricate head appendages. These appendages contain “bombs”, spheres that burst into light when released. The bombs evolved from gills, since they are in the same location as the gills, which can fall off easily. It remains unclear why this adaptation may have occurred. The implications of this evolutionary benefit may provide insight about how the environment of the S. bombiviridis, shapes the nature of its anatomical features.

=== Morphology ===
S. bombiviridis are mobile deep sea acrocirrid worms that have 30 bristles made of chitin, or chaetae on each parapodium. They use these bristles to propel through the water by lateral undulation in combination with a power stroke and a recovery stroke.

S. bombiviridis only releases a few bioluminescent bombs at once upon mechanical stimulation along its length. Microscopy of the ‘bombs’ reveals that they contain hemolymph filled sacs separated by central chambers. These most likely evolved from homologous branchiae. Although it has not been confirmed, S. bombiviridis likely employs this ability as a mechanism of distraction, parallel to squid that release bioluminescent liquid to escape their predators. This is to be expected based on the many polychaetes that use bioluminescence for evasion. Furthermore, the bombs are unlikely to be used for reproduction due to the nature of this release, and due to the fact that these appendages are observed in both juvenile and adult forms.

== Discovery ==
S bombiviridis was first discovered in 2009 by scientists at the Scripps Institution of Oceanography at UC San Diego, and was initially reported in Science along with seven other new species of worm, forming a new clade of marine worms within Acrocirridae.
