= Chaetopterus charlesdarwinii =

Scientific classification
- Kingdom: Animalia
- Phylum: Annelida
- Family: Chaetopteridae
- Genus: Chaetopterus
- Species: C. charlesdarwinii

Binomial name
- Chaetopterus charlesdarwinii Nishi, Hickman & Bailey-Brock, 2009

Species of annelid worm

Chaetopterus charlesdarwinii is a species of parchment worm, a marine polychaete in the family Chaetopteridae.

Chaetopterus charlesdarwinii is named in honor of Charles Darwin.

== Description and biology ==
Chaetopterus charlesdarwinii is characterized by nine anterior region chaetigers and a brown hand on the lateral of the ventral shield and rear side of the anterior region notopodia. It occurs in irregularly curved tubes attached to the underside of rocks.

== Distribution ==
Chaetopterus charlesdarwinii is endemic to the Galapagos Islands.
