= Chaetopterus kagosimensis =

Scientific classification
- Kingdom: Animalia
- Phylum: Annelida
- Family: Chaetopteridae
- Genus: Chaetopterus
- Species: C. kagosimensis

Binomial name
- Chaetopterus kagosimensis Izuka, 1911

Species of annelid worm

Chaetopterus kagosimensis is a species of parchment worm, a marine polychaete in the family Chaetopteridae

== Taxonomy ==
Chaetopterus kagosimensis was formerly synonymized with C. variopedatus but recent papers have found it to be a valid species.
