= Chaetopterus gregarius =

Scientific classification
- Kingdom: Animalia
- Phylum: Annelida
- Family: Chaetopteridae
- Genus: Chaetopterus
- Species: C. gregarius

Binomial name
- Chaetopterus gregarius Nishi, Arai & Sasanuma, 2000

Species of annelid worm

Chaetopterus gregarius is a species of parchment worm, a marine polychaete in the family Chaetopteridae.

== Distribution and biology ==
Chaetopterus gregarius is known from coastal waters off Tokyo Bay in Japan. It tends to be gregarious and attaches itself to hard substrate.
