= Chaetopterus macropus =

Scientific classification
- Kingdom: Animalia
- Phylum: Annelida
- Family: Chaetopteridae
- Genus: Chaetopterus
- Species: C. macropus

Binomial name
- Chaetopterus macropus Schmarda, 1861

Species of annelid worm

Chaetopterus macropus is a species of parchment worm, a marine polychaete in the family Chaetopteridae.

== Description ==
Chaetopterus macropus is a solitary species which lives in a U-shaped tube on a sandy bottom. It has nine anterior region chaetigers and no brown bands in region-A.
