= Chaetopterus bruneli =

Scientific classification
- Kingdom: Animalia
- Phylum: Annelida
- Family: Chaetopteridae
- Genus: Chaetopterus
- Species: C. bruneli

Binomial name
- Chaetopterus bruneli Moore, Gagnon & Petersen, 2020

Species of annelid worm

Chaetopterus bruneli is a species of parchment worm, a marine polychaete in the family Chaetopteridae. The species is named in honor of Dr. Pierre Brunel of Montreal University.

== Distribution ==
Chaetopterus bruneli inhabits Atlantic waters off eastern Canada.
