= Chaetopterus galapagensis =

Scientific classification
- Kingdom: Animalia
- Phylum: Annelida
- Family: Chaetopteridae
- Genus: Chaetopterus
- Species: C. galapagensis

Binomial name
- Chaetopterus galapagensis Nishi, Hickman & Bailey-Brock, 2009

Species of annelid worm

Chaetopterus galapagensis is a species of parchment worm, a marine polychaete in the family Chaetopteridae.

== Description and biology ==
Chaetopterus galapagensis has 12-14 chaetigers in the anterior region and 7-8 teeth on the uncini of region A neuropodia. It inhabits a U-shaped tube in soft sand substrates.

== Distribution ==
Chaetopterus galapagensis is endemic to the Galapagos Islands.
