= Chaetopterus izuensis =

Scientific classification
- Kingdom: Animalia
- Phylum: Annelida
- Family: Chaetopteridae
- Genus: Chaetopterus
- Species: C. izuensis

Binomial name
- Chaetopterus izuensis Nishi, 2001

Species of annelid worm

Chaetopterus izuensis is a species of parchment worm, a marine polychaete in the family Chaetopteridae.

== Description ==
Chaetopterus izuensis is characterized by its lack of eyes, a small peristomium, a narrow, wing-like notopodium on the first chaetiger of the middle region, and long, straight posterior region notopodia with a knob-like tip. It resides in epibiotic, sand-formed tubes.
