= Chaetopterus longipes =

Scientific classification
- Kingdom: Animalia
- Phylum: Annelida
- Family: Chaetopteridae
- Genus: Chaetopterus
- Species: C. longipes

Binomial name
- Chaetopterus longipes Crossland, 1904

Species of annelid worm

Chaetopterus longipes is a species of parchment worm, a marine polychaete in the family Chaetopteridae.

== Biology and distribution ==
Chaetopterus longipes is a highly gregarious parchment worm that forms aggregations of hundreds of worms. It occurs in the Indian Ocean and the Red Sea.
