= Chaetopterus aduncus =

Scientific classification
- Kingdom: Animalia
- Phylum: Annelida
- Family: Chaetopteridae
- Genus: Chaetopterus
- Species: C. aduncus

Binomial name
- Chaetopterus aduncus Nishi, Hickman & Bailey-Brock, 2009

Species of annelid worm

Chaetopterus aduncus is a species of parchment worm, a marine polychaete in the family Chaetopteridae.

== Description ==
Chaetopterus aduncus differs from C. charlesdarwinii and C. galapagensis in having 10-11 anterior region chaetigers, a J-shaped tube with one blind end, and prominent dorsal bulbous inflations in the anterior region chaetigers.

== Distribution ==
Chaetopterus aduncus is endemic to the Galapagos Islands.
