= Flying buttocks =

Flying buttocks may refer to:

- Chaetopterus pugaporcinus, commonly known as the pigbutt worm
- The Hybrid Air Vehicles Airlander 10, affectionately called in U.S. English as "The Flying Buttocks"
