= Chaetopterus cautus =

Scientific classification
- Kingdom: Animalia
- Phylum: Annelida
- Family: Chaetopteridae
- Genus: Chaetopterus
- Species: C. cautus

Binomial name
- Chaetopterus cautus Marenzeller, 1879

Species of annelid worm

Chaetopterus cautus is a species of parchment worm, a marine polychaete in the family Chaetopteridae.

== Taxonomy ==
Chaetopterus cautus was formerly synonymized with Chaetopterus variopedatus, it has been elevated to a full species based on morphologic distinctiveness.
