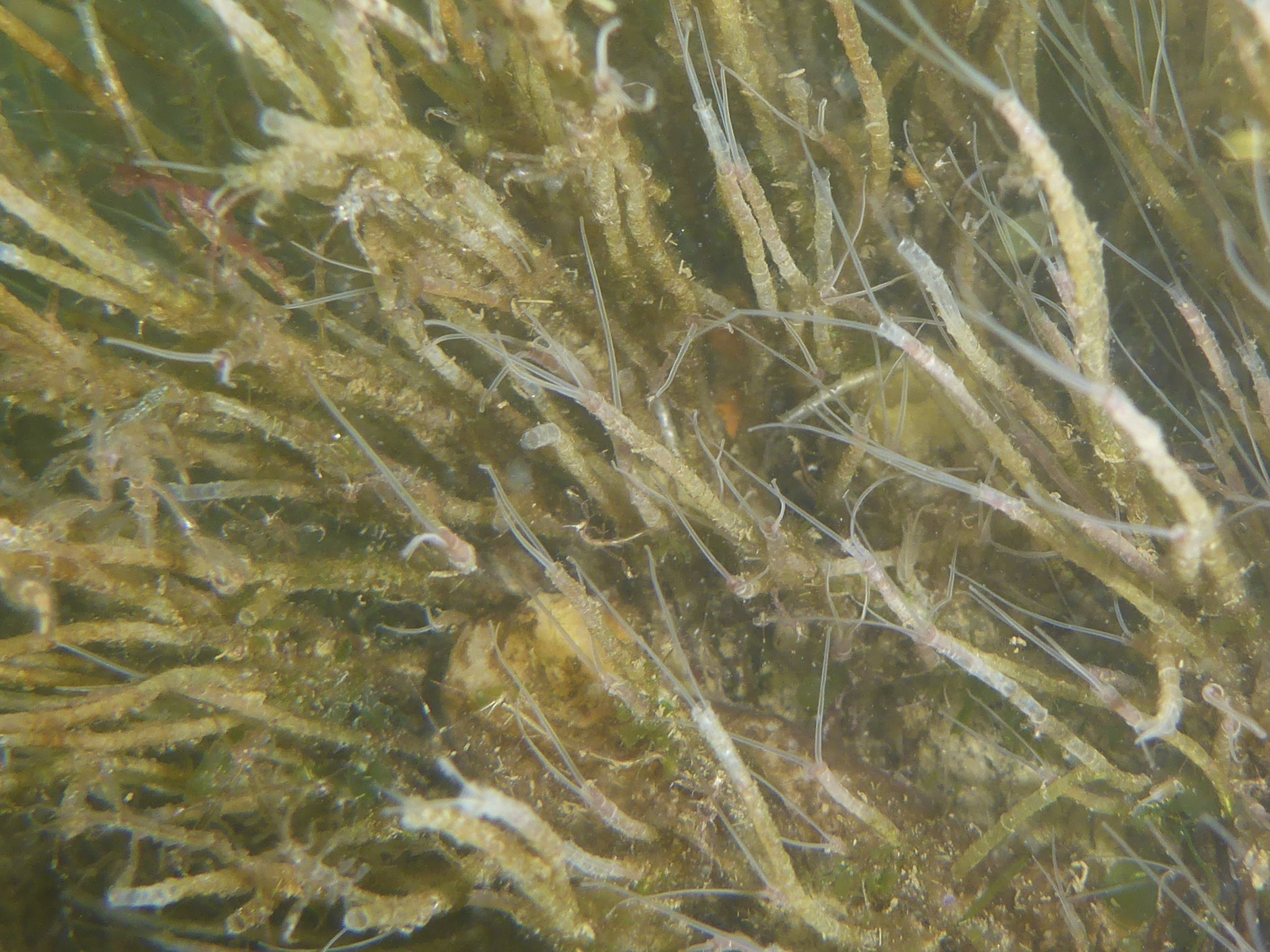

Scientific classification
- Domain: Eukaryota
- Kingdom: Animalia
- Phylum: Annelida
- Clade: Pleistoannelida
- Clade: Sedentaria
- Order: Spionida
- Family: Chaetopteridae
- Genus: Phyllochaetopterus
- Species: P. prolifica

Binomial name
- Phyllochaetopterus prolifica Potts, 1914

Synonyms
- Phyllochaetopterus pacificaMacGinitie & MacGinitie, 1949

= Phyllochaetopterus prolifica =

Species of annelid worm

Phyllochaetopterus prolifica is a species of marine polychaete worms that live in a tube that it constructs. It is native to shallow waters in the eastern Pacific Ocean and forms colonies of tubes on rocks and submerged objects.

== Description ==
Worms in the family Chaetopteridae have soft bodies and occupy permanent chitinous or parchment-like tubes that they create. P. prolifica is a colonial species which forms dense collections of tubes, many of which are branched. Clusters of these tubes may be 30 cm (12 in) high. At the anterior end of the worm is the prostomium which bears a pair of eyes and a pair of long palps but no antennae. The peristomium (area surrounding the mouth) has a pair of short tentacles. Below this, the segmented body is divided into three regions which differ in the arrangement of the parapodia (lateral lobes). On the first segment of the anterior region of the body is a pair of tentacular cirri and a pair of palps. The middle region consists of four to twelve segments and the posterior region consists of many short segments.

== Distribution and habitat ==
Phyllochaetopterus prolifica is native to the eastern Pacific Ocean. Its range extends from British Columbia to Baja California and from Ecuador to southern Chile. It is found in the subtidal zone with a depth range of 0 to 24 m (0 to 80 ft), typically on rocks, but also on pilings and floating docks.

== Ecology ==
Phyllochaetopterus prolifica is an opportunistic feeder, being a deposit feeder or a suspension feeder depending on circumstances. It can reproduce asexually by dividing to form new individuals, or can breed sexually by shedding sperm and eggs into the sea.

The dense colonies of branching tubes of this worm provide a habitat with an abundance of food and low risk of predation for the juveniles of some species of starfish. Researchers in Washington state found that the larvae of the vermillion sea star (Mediaster aequalis) preferentially settled on the tubes. They also found juveniles of the sand star (Luidia foliolata), the common sunstar (Crossaster papposus), the Pacific blood star (Henricia leviuscula), the sun star (Solaster stimpsoni), the morning sun star (Solaster dawsoni), and the slime star (Pteraster tesselatus) on the worm tubes but not in the surrounding environment.
