= Chaetopterus pacificus =

Scientific classification
- Kingdom: Animalia
- Phylum: Annelida
- Family: Chaetopteridae
- Genus: Chaetopterus
- Species: C. pacificus

Binomial name
- Chaetopterus pacificus Nishi, 2001

Species of annelid worm

Chaetopterus pacificus is a species of parchment worm, a marine polychaete in the family Chaetopteridae.

== Description and biology ==
Chaetopterus pacificus is known from sandy bottoms from the Izu Peninsula to the Boso Peninsula, in central Japan. It is distinct in having an extended flip-like peristomium, a higher number (11-12) of chaetigers (chitinous bristle) in the anterior region, and a U-shaped tube.
