= Chaetopterus dewysee =

Scientific classification
- Kingdom: Animalia
- Phylum: Annelida
- Family: Chaetopteridae
- Genus: Chaetopterus
- Species: C. dewysee

Binomial name
- Chaetopterus dewysee Tilic & Rouse, 2020

Species of annelid worm

Chaetopterus dewysee is a species of parchment worm, a marine polychaete in the family Chaetopteridae.

== Distribution ==
Chaetopterus dewysee is found in coastal waters off southern California.
