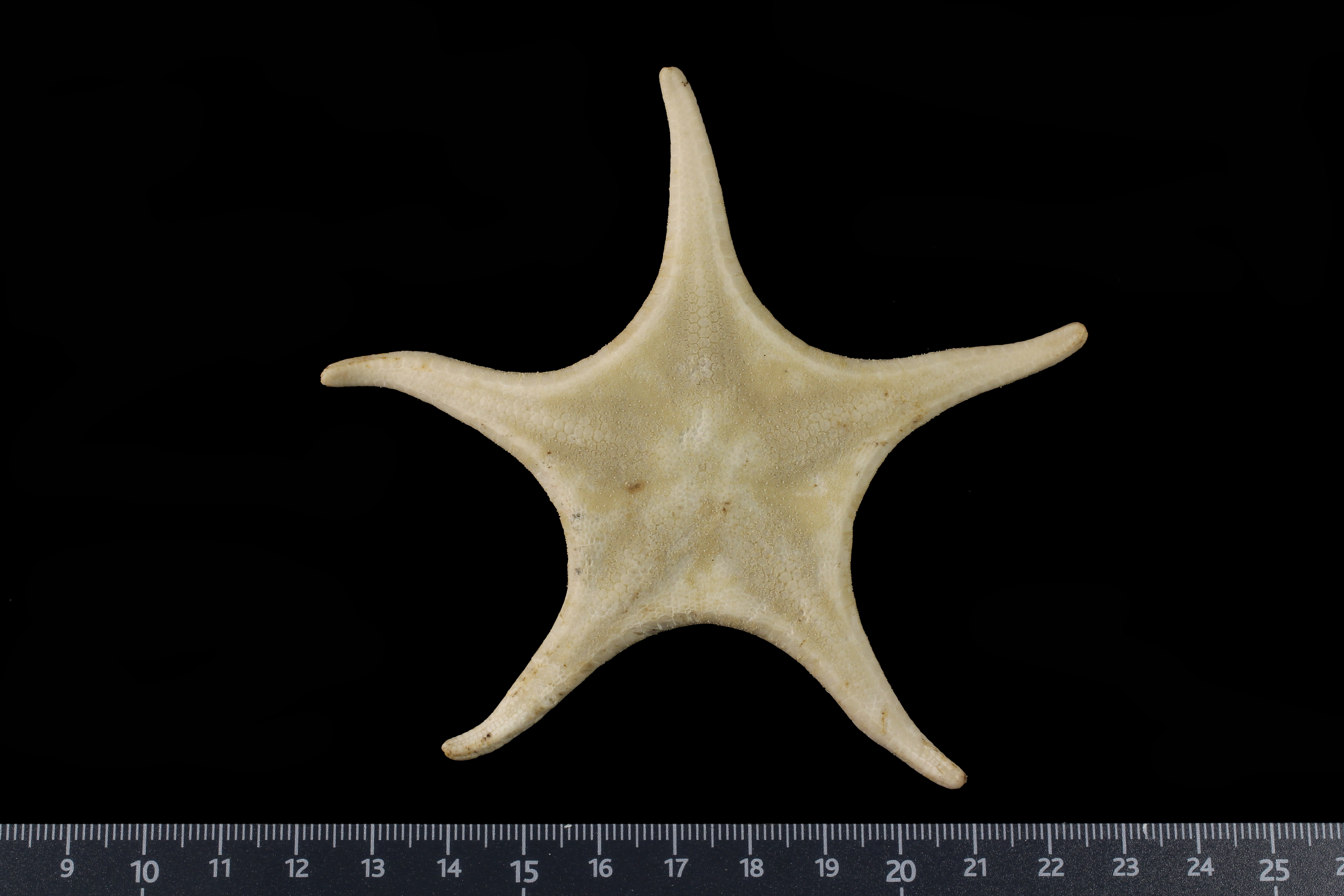
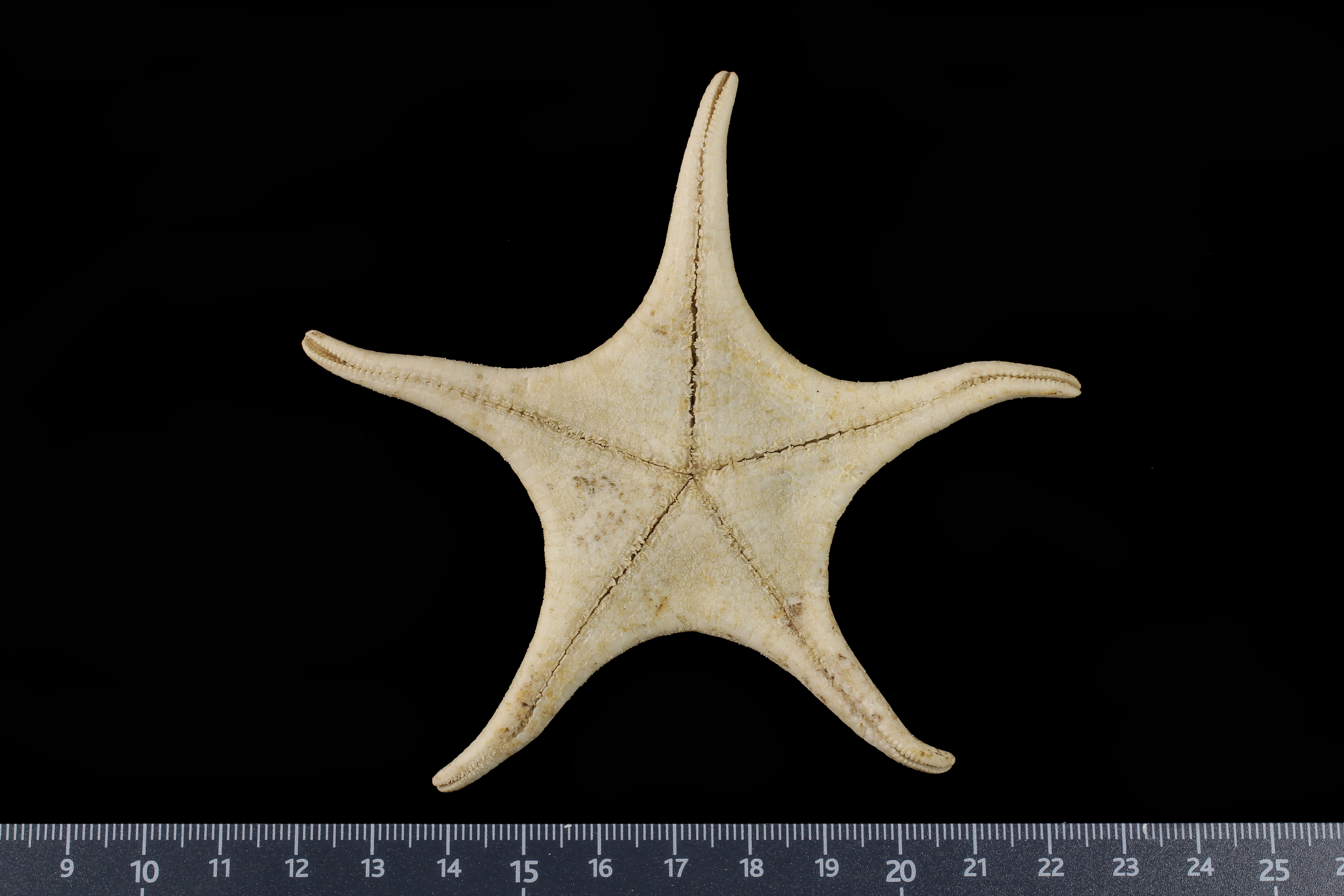
- The holotype of Mediaster mollis, viewed from above (top) and below (bottom)

Scientific classification
- Kingdom: Animalia
- Phylum: Echinodermata
- Class: Asteroidea
- Order: Valvatida
- Family: Goniasteridae
- Genus: Mediaster
- Species: M. mollis

Binomial name
- Mediaster mollis Mah, 2018

= Mediaster mollis =

Species of starfish

Mediaster mollis is a species of starfish in the family Goniasteridae.

== Taxonomy and etymology ==
The species was formally described by Christopher Mah in 2018. He gave it the specific name mollis (latin for "soft") in reference to the upper surface of the body wall, which is soft.

== Description ==
The holotype measures 5.4 centimeters from the center to the end of the arms and 2 centimeters from the center to the edge of the central disk. Mediaster mollis has a clear star shape and, when alive, has a bright yellow to orange coloration.

The upper surface is covered with rough, round granules (15 to 60 per plate) and pedicellariae resembling the jaws of an alligator (one to two on almost all plates). These are found in higher concentrations at the very edges, with 100 to 200 granules and up to three pedicellariae per plate.

There are 10 to 11 thin, short furrow spines with blunt tips on each plate of the furrows (the grooves on the underside that tube feet emerge from). Next to the furrow spines are two rows of subambulacral spines with 5 or 6 per plate. The first row has double the thickness of the furrow spines, and the second has one fourth the length of the others, with fine points and spaced farther apart from each other.

== Distribution ==
This species is known from the western Indian Ocean, at depths of 452 to 833 meters.
