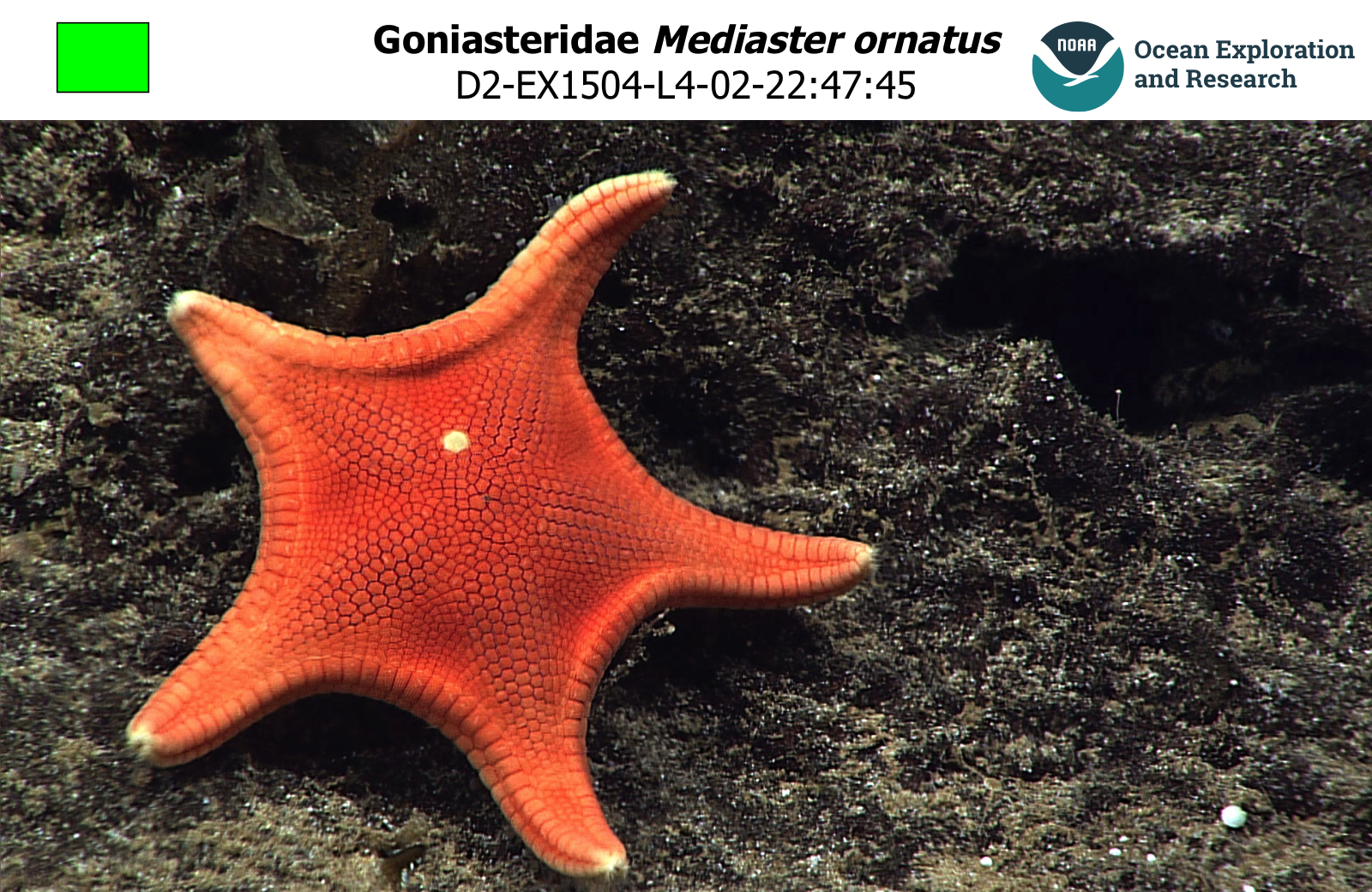
- Mediaster ornatus

Scientific classification
- Kingdom: Animalia
- Phylum: Echinodermata
- Class: Asteroidea
- Order: Valvatida
- Family: Goniasteridae
- Genus: Mediaster; Stimpson, 1857

Type species
- Mediaster aequalis Stimpson, 1857

Species
- See text.

Synonyms
- Isaster Verrill, 1894

= Mediaster =

Genus of starfishes

Mediaster is a genus of starfish in the family Goniasteridae. It was circumscribed in 1857 by William Stimpson for M. aequalis, the genus's type species. Its junior synonym is the genus Isaster, which was circumscribed in 1894 by Addison Emery Verrill for the species now known as M. bairdi. Verrill himself synonymized the two genus names in 1899.

== Species ==
As of 2018, the World Register of Marine Species lists the following species as being in the genus:

- Mediaster aequalis Stimpson, 1857
- Mediaster arcuatus (Sladen, 1889)
- Mediaster australiensis H.L. Clark, 1916
- Mediaster bairdi (Verrill, 1882)
- Mediaster boardmani (Livingstone, 1934)
- Mediaster brachiatus Goto, 1914
- Mediaster capensis H.L. Clark, 1923
- Mediaster gartrelli H.E.S. Clark, 2001
- Mediaster hayi Blake, 1986 †
- Mediaster mollis Mah, 2018
- Mediaster murrayi Macan, 1938
- Mediaster ornatus Fisher, 1906
- Mediaster pedicellaris (Perrier, 1881)
- Mediaster praestans Livingstone, 1933
- Mediaster roanae Mah, 2018
- Mediaster setosus Mah, 2018
- Mediaster sladeni Benham, 1909
- Mediaster tenellus Fisher, 1904
- Mediaster trapezium Mah, 2026
