= Pinnixa chaetopterana =

Scientific classification
- Kingdom: Animalia
- Phylum: Arthropoda
- Clade: Pancrustacea
- Class: Malacostraca
- Order: Decapoda
- Suborder: Pleocyemata
- Infraorder: Brachyura
- Family: Pinnotheridae
- Genus: Pinnixa
- Species: P. chaetopterana

Binomial name
- Pinnixa chaetopterana Stimpson, 1860

Species of crab

Pinnixa chaetopterana, the tube pea crab, is a small decapod crustacean that lives harmlessly within the tube of the polychaete worm, Chaetopterus variopedatus.

== Description ==
P. chaetopterana is a tiny, soft-bodied crab. The bodies of all species of Pinnixa are much wider than they are long. The adults are difficult to distinguish from each other and all live in the tubes or burrows of other invertebrates.

The larvae are quite dissimilar to the adults. They spends some time drifting in the zooplankton and there are five zoeal stages. The carapace is caltrop-shaped and has dorsal, rostral and lateral spines. The antennae are limited to a spinous process and a single seta. The length of the dorsal spine is less than 1.5 times the length of the rostral spine. The second and third abdominal somites have dorso-lateral knobs and the fifth somite has lateral knobs that project wing-like over the telson which has a median notch.

== Distribution ==
This crab is found on the western side of the Atlantic Ocean, including Brazil, the Gulf of Mexico, Florida, North Carolina and Massachusetts. It lives at depths of up to sixty metres.

== Ecology ==
Although Chaetopterus variopedatus is of cosmopolitan distribution, P. chaetopterana and another pea crab, Polyonyx gibbesi, are only found associated with it along the eastern seaboard of America from Massachusetts to Uruguay. The latter is an obligate commensal of the tube worm whereas P. chaetopterana is a facultative one. The latter is occasionally free living and also sometimes associates with other hosts such as another polychaete worm, Amphitrite ornata. The two species of crab are intolerant of each other and if placed together in a dish will fight and tear off each other's limbs. In the tube of C. variopedatus, a pair of crabs will take up a position posterior to the worm and if the worm turns round, they move so as to remain behind it. It is likely that the crabs gain protection from predators within the tubes and gather food in the form of plankton from the water pumped past them by the host worm. The crabs may bite holes in the tube to increase the size of the aperture and go in and out at will.

The ribbon worm, Carcinemertes pinnotheridophila, is a parasite found in the branchial chambers of this pea crab, and the worm's eggs can sometimes be seen attached to the hairs on the second abdominal appendage of the female crab alongside her own eggs.
