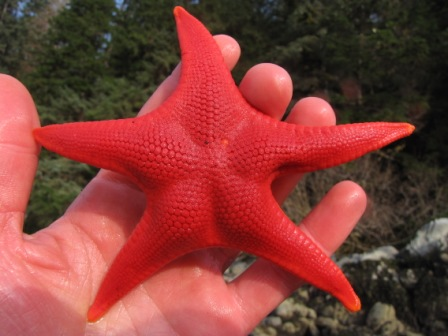

Scientific classification
- Kingdom: Animalia
- Phylum: Echinodermata
- Class: Asteroidea
- Order: Valvatida
- Family: Goniasteridae
- Genus: Mediaster
- Species: M. aequalis

Binomial name
- Mediaster aequalis Stimpson, 1857

Synonyms
- Ophidiaster aequalis Dujardin & Hupe, 1862

= Mediaster aequalis =

Vermilion sea star

Species of starfish

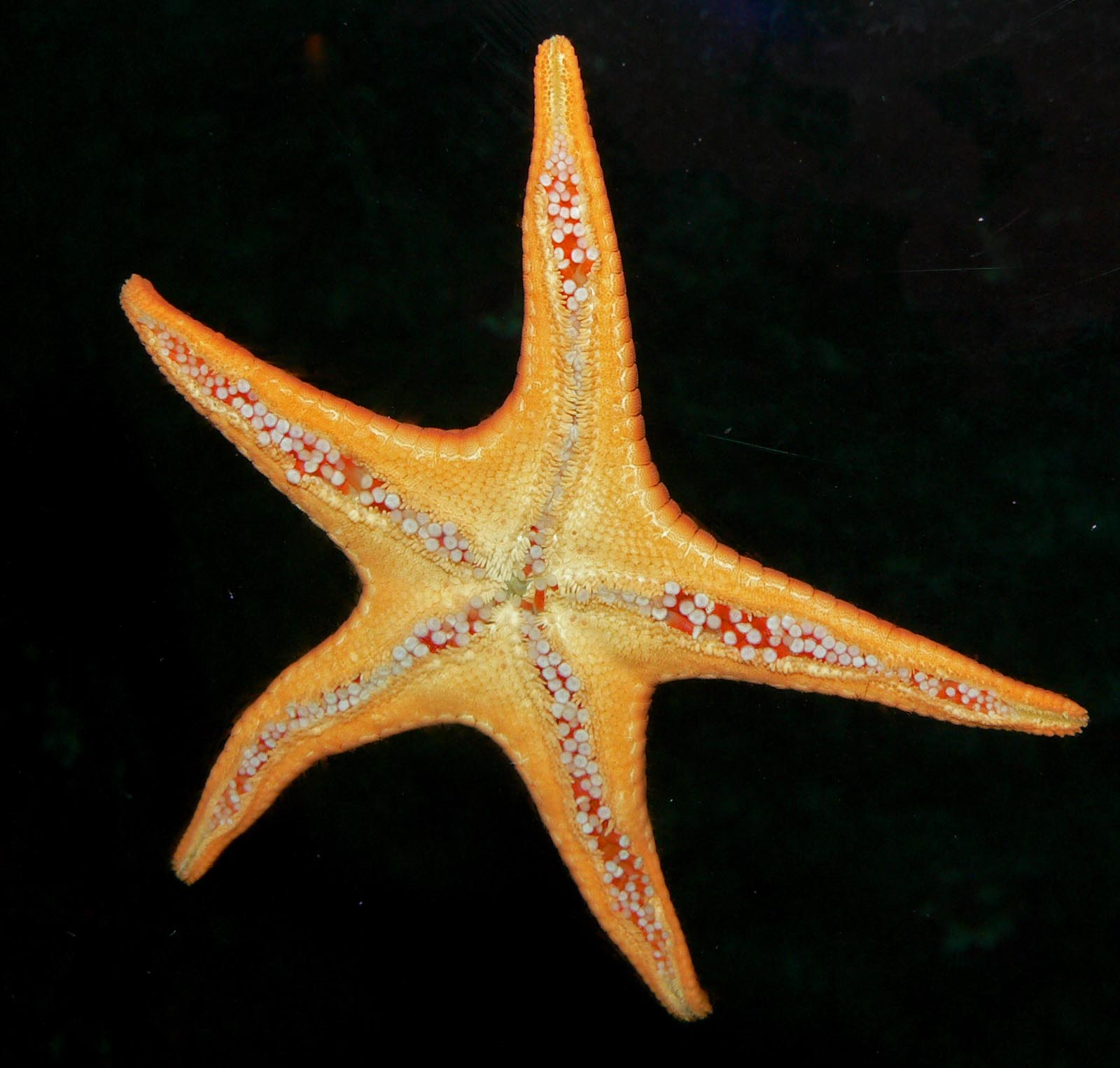
Oral surface seen through glass

Mediaster aequalis is a species of sea star in the family Goniasteridae. It is native to the west coast of North America, ranging from Alaska to California. It is found in various habitats including beaches during very low tides, and at depths down to about 500 m (1,600 ft). Also known as the vermilion sea star, it is the type species of the genus Mediaster and was first described in 1857 by the American zoologist William Stimpson.

== Description ==
M. aequalis has five (occasionally four or six) stumpy arms and grows to a diameter of up to 20 cm (8 in). The aboral (upper) surface is bright red while the oral (under) surface is an orangey-red. The tube feet are red. There is a row of conspicuous marginal plates along the edge of the arms on the aboral surface, and the central disc bears many flat-topped ossicles (platelike calcareous structures); these consist of a central group of granules surrounded by a ring of about twenty-five marginal granules.

== Distribution and habitat ==
M. aequalis is native to the western coast of North America, its range extending from Chignik Bay in Alaska southwards to Baja California. It often inhabits rocky substrates, at depths ranging from the low intertidal to around 500 m (1,600 ft).

== Ecology ==
M. aequalis is both an omnivore and a predator and will scavenge for dead animals and detritus. As well as feeding on algae, it preys on tunicates (such as sea pork), sea pens, sponges, bryozoans, brachiopods and polychaete worms. In its turn it is hunted by the larger morning sun star. It can move at the rate of 40 cm (16 in) per minute, which is fast for a starfish. Juvenile M. aequalis often congregate among the tubes of Phyllochaetopterus prolifica, a tube-dwelling worm, and research in Washington state has shown that the larvae are highly selective in where they settle, exclusively choosing to do so on these tubes.
