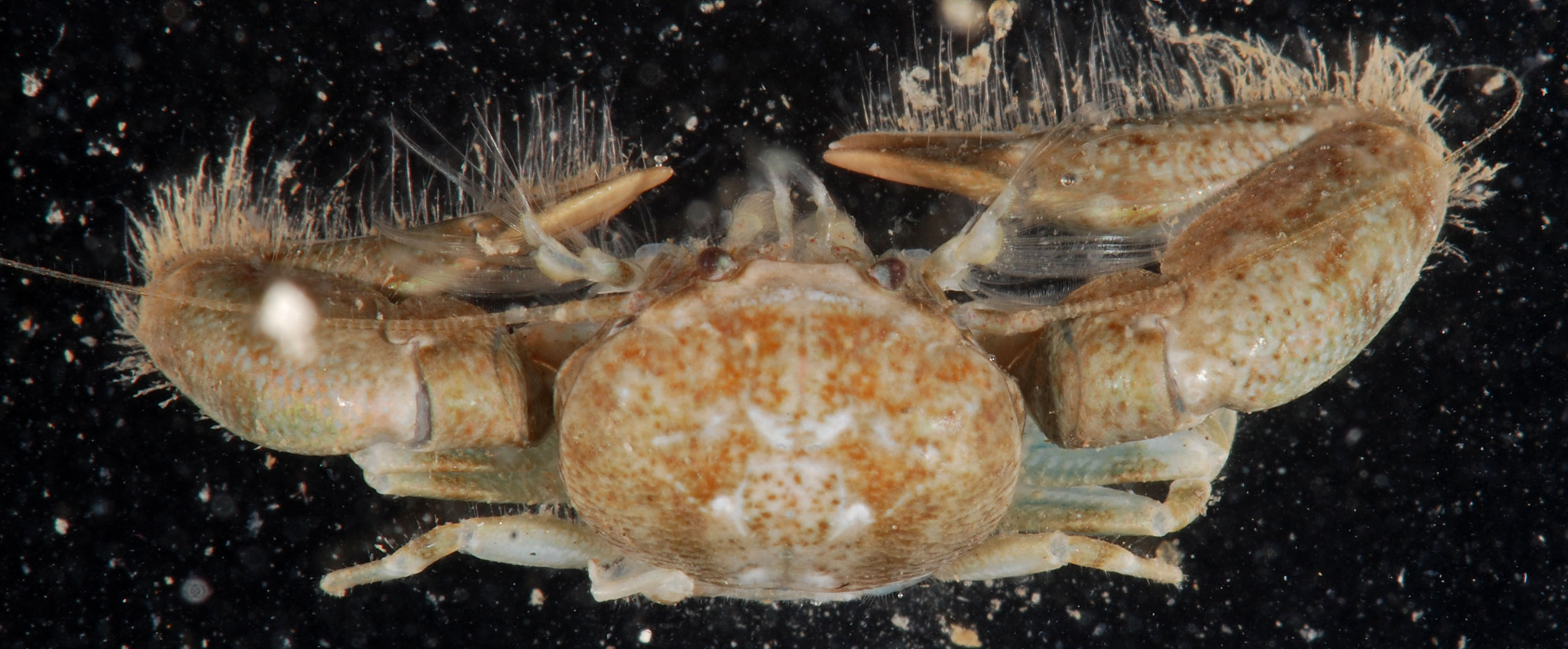
- Polyonyx gibbesi

Scientific classification
- Domain: Eukaryota
- Kingdom: Animalia
- Phylum: Arthropoda
- Class: Malacostraca
- Order: Decapoda
- Suborder: Pleocyemata
- Infraorder: Anomura
- Family: Porcellanidae
- Genus: Polyonyx; Stimpson, 1858

= Polyonyx =

Genus of crabs

Polyonyx is a genus of porcelain crabs in the family Porcellanidae. There are at least 42 described species in Polyonyx.

== Species ==
The species belonging to the genus Polyonyx include the following:

- Polyonyx angustus Osawa, 2018
- Polyonyx biunguiculatus (Dana, 1852)
- Polyonyx boucheti Osawa, 2007
- Polyonyx bouvieri de Saint Joseph, 1900
- Polyonyx confinis Haig, 1960
- Polyonyx deezi Osawa & Sato, 2022
- Polyonyx gibbesi Haig, 1956
- Polyonyx haigae McNeill, 1968
- Polyonyx hendersoni Southwell, 1909
- Polyonyx heok Osawa & Ng, 2016
- Polyonyx kumejima Osawa & Ng, 2016
- Polyonyx loimicola Sankolli, 1965
- Polyonyx maccullochi Haig, 1965
- Polyonyx nitidus Lockington, 1878
- Polyonyx obesulus Miers, 1884
- Polyonyx pedalis Nobili, 1906
- Polyonyx pilosibrachium Osawa, Naruse & Ng, 2018
- Polyonyx planus Osawa & Ng, 2016
- Polyonyx quadratus Chace, 1956
- Polyonyx sasekumari Osawa, Naruse & Ng, 2018
- Polyonyx senegalensis Chace, 1956
- Polyonyx similis Osawa, 2015
- Polyonyx sinensis Stimpson, 1858
- Polyonyx socialis Werding & Hiller, 2019
- Polyonyx spina Osawa, 2007
- Polyonyx splendidus Sankolli, 1966
- Polyonyx thai Werding, 2001
- Polyonyx transversus (Haswell, 1882)
- Polyonyx triunguiculatus Zehntner, 1894
- Polyonyx tulearis Werding, 2001
- Polyonyx utinomii Miyake, 1943
- Polyonyx vermicola Ng & Sasekumar, 1993
