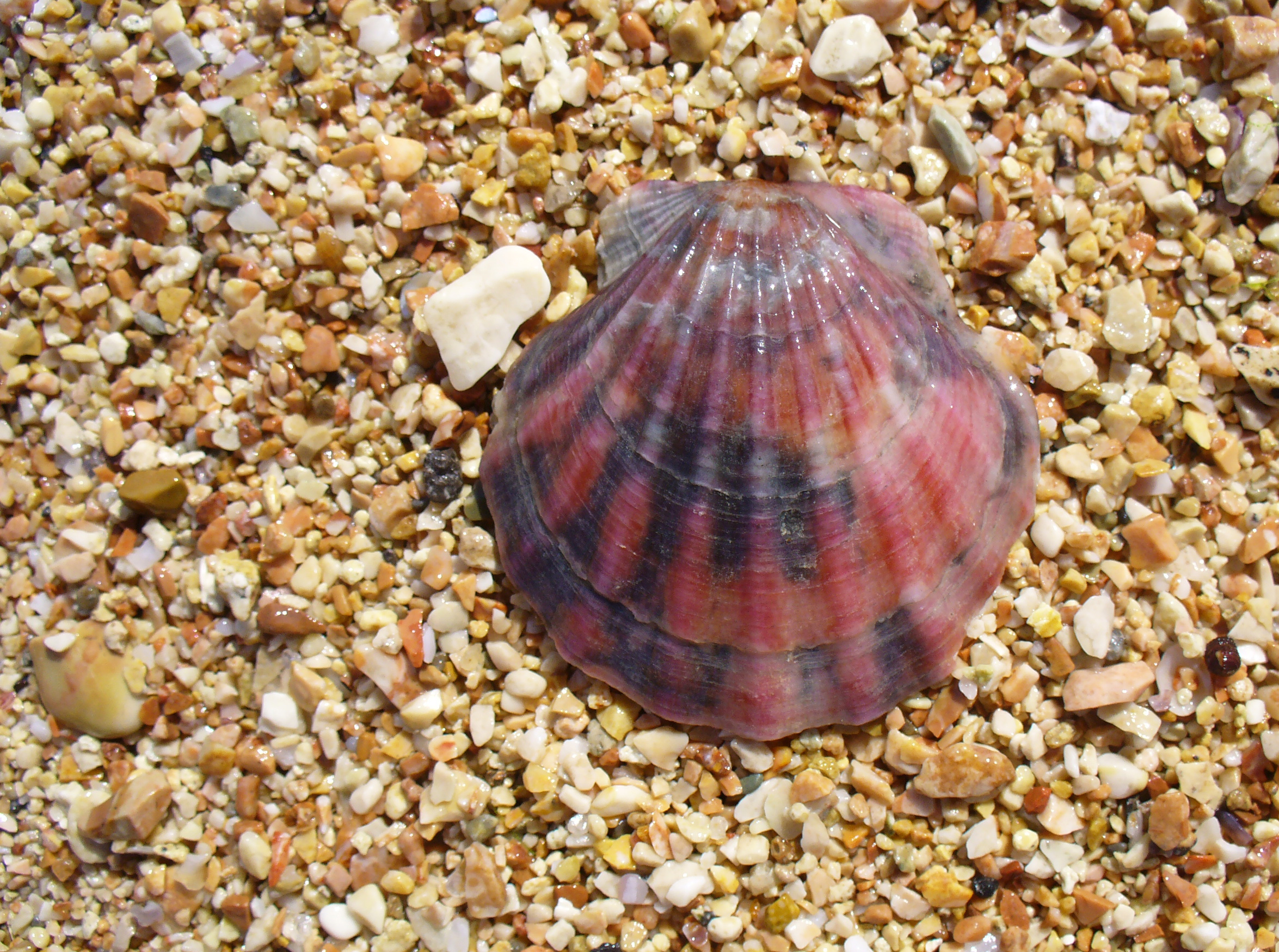
- A valve of Flexopecten glaber ponticus
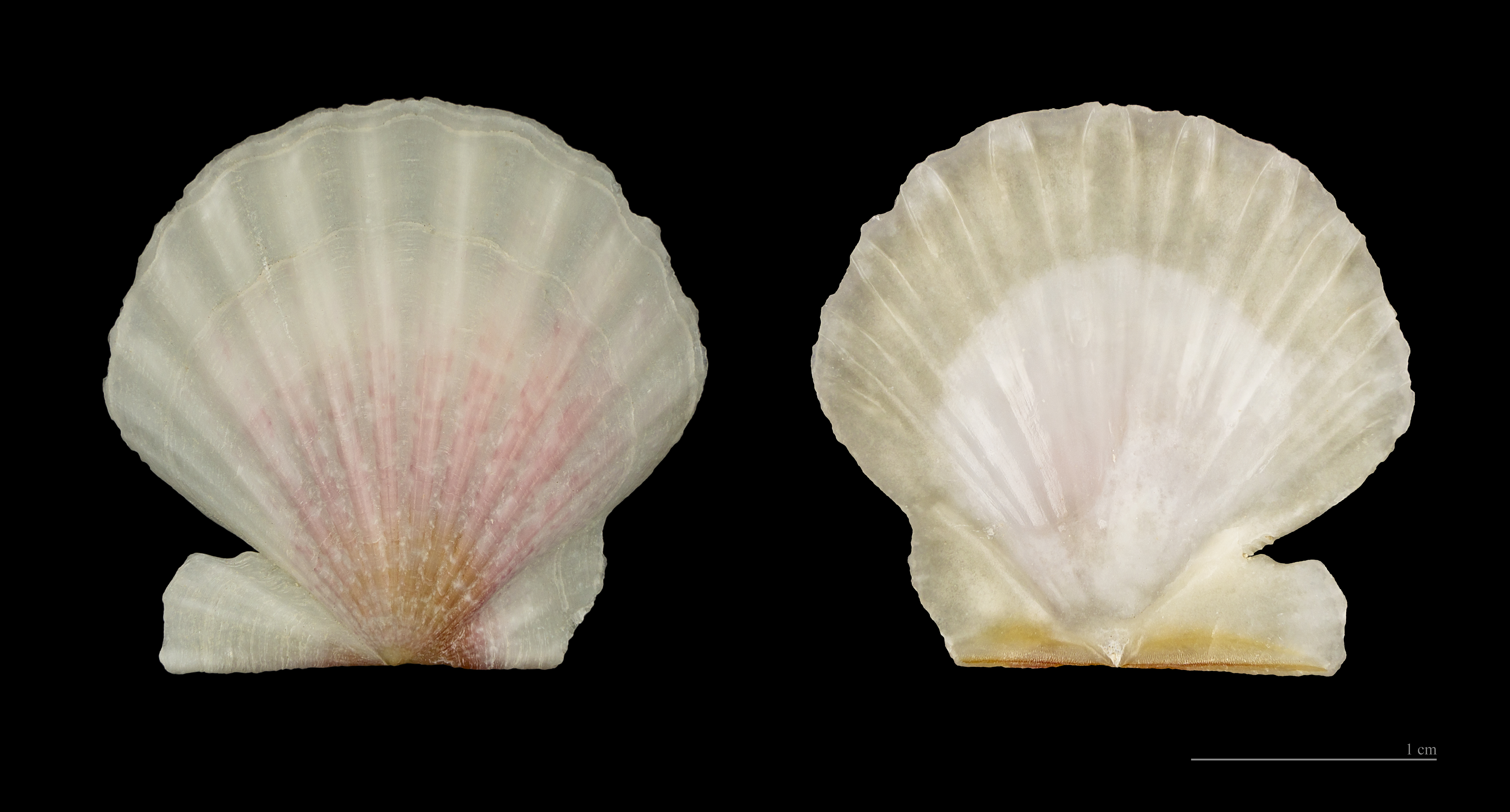
- Flexopecten glaber ponticus - MHNT

Scientific classification
- Kingdom: Animalia
- Phylum: Mollusca
- Class: Bivalvia
- Order: Pectinida
- Family: Pectinidae
- Genus: Flexopecten
- Species: F. glaber

Binomial name
- Flexopecten glaber (Linnaeus, 1758)

= Flexopecten glaber =

Species of bivalve

Flexopecten glaber is a species of saltwater clam, a scallop, a marine bivalve mollusks in the family Pectinidae, the scallops.

Flexopecten glaber distans
Right and left valve of the same specimen:

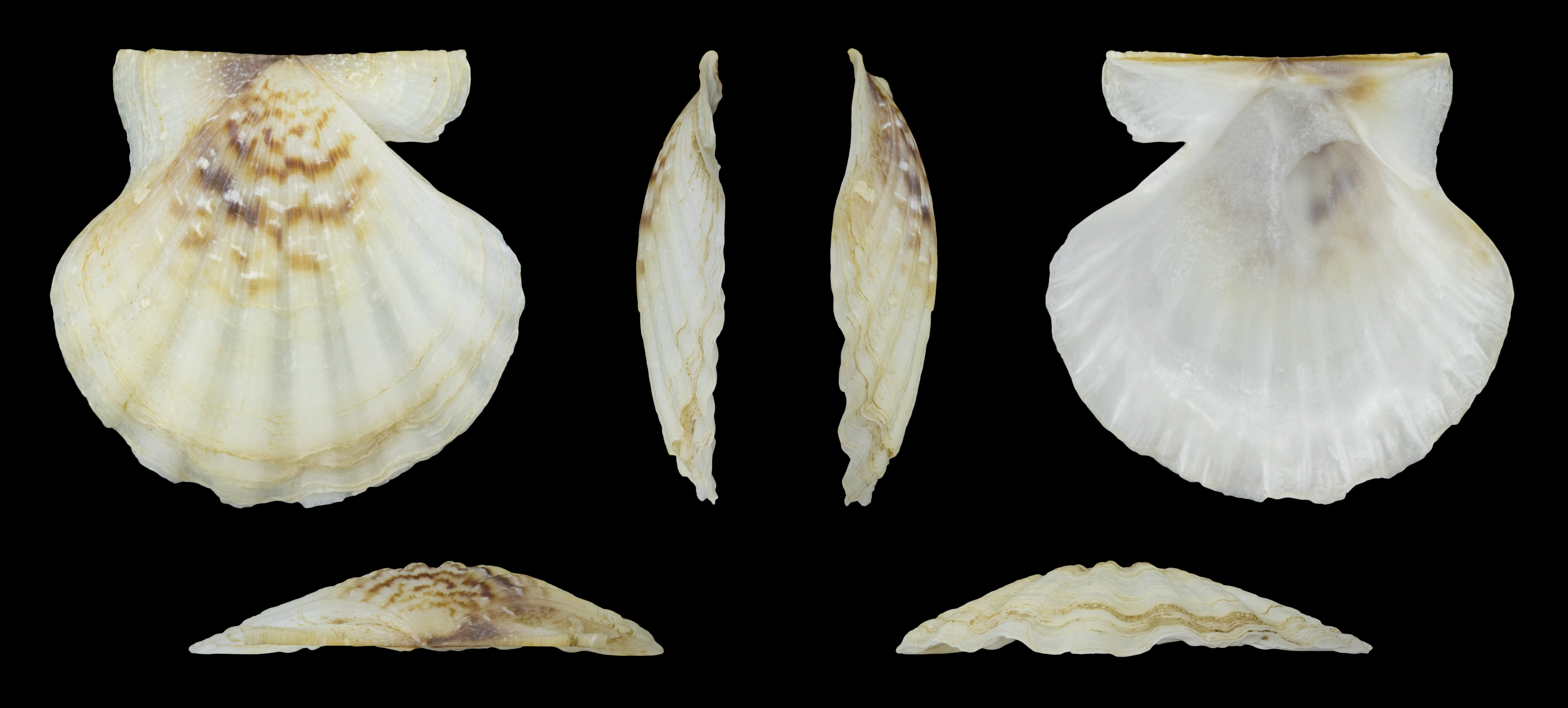
Right valve

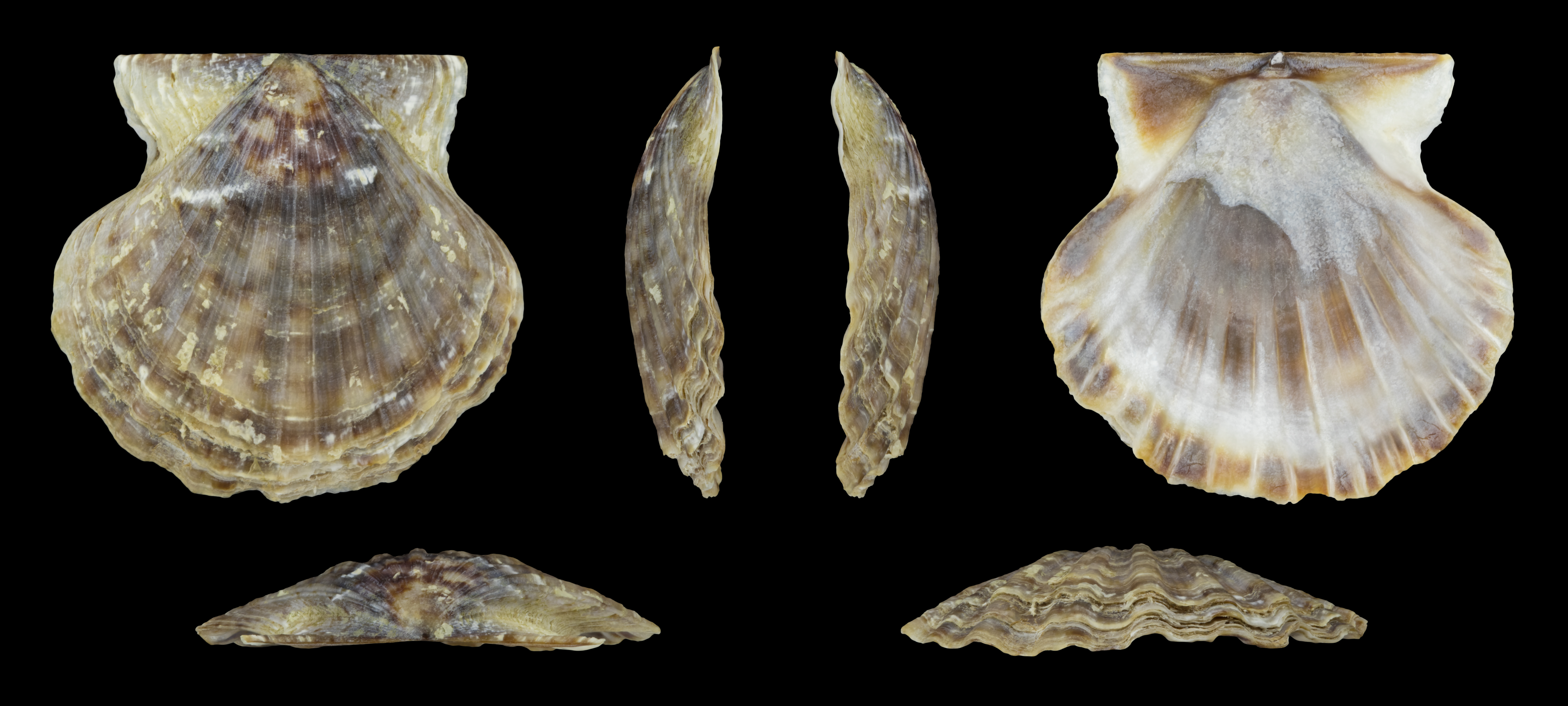
Left valve

== Subspecies ==
Subspecies of this species recognized by WoRMS include:

- Flexopecten glaber ponticus (Bucquoy, Dautzenberg & Dollfus, 1889), from the Black Sea

Synonyms:

- Flexopecten glaber glaber (Linnaeus, 1758) = Flexopecten glaber (Linnaeus, 1758)
- Flexopecten glaber proteus (Dillwyn, 1817) = Flexopecten glaber (Linnaeus, 1758)
- Flexopecten proteus (Dillwyn, 1817) = Flexopecten glaber (Linnaeus, 1758)
