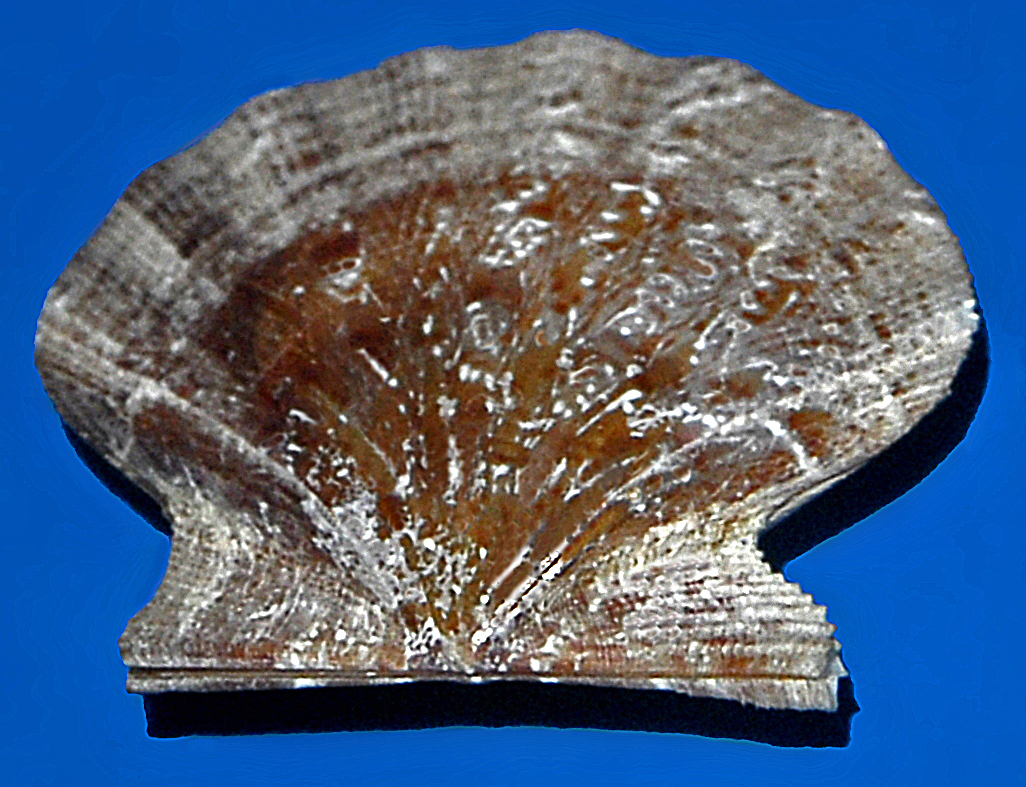
- A valve of Flexopecten hyalinus from Sicily on display at the Museo Civico di Storia Naturale di Milano

Scientific classification
- Domain: Eukaryota
- Kingdom: Animalia
- Phylum: Mollusca
- Class: Bivalvia
- Order: Pectinida
- Family: Pectinidae
- Genus: Flexopecten
- Species: F. hyalinus

Binomial name
- Flexopecten hyalinus (Poli, 1795)

Synonyms
- Lissopecten hyalinus (Poli, 1795); Ostrea hyalina Poli, 1795; Palliolum hyalinum (Poli, 1795); Pecten flagellatus Delessert, 1841; Pecten pellucidus Lamarck, 1819; Pecten pulcherrimus Risso, 1826; Pecten succineus Risso, 1826

= Flexopecten hyalinus =

Hyaline scallop

Species of bivalve

Flexopecten hyalinus, the hyaline scallop, is a species of saltwater clams, a scallop, a marine bivalve mollusc in the family Pectinidae, the scallops.

== Description ==
The shell of an adult Flexopecten hyalinus can be as large as 20–30 millimetres (0.79–1.18 in). This shell is delicate, with a brown or pale brown surface, almost translucent and has quite flat ribs.

Right and left valve of the same specimen:

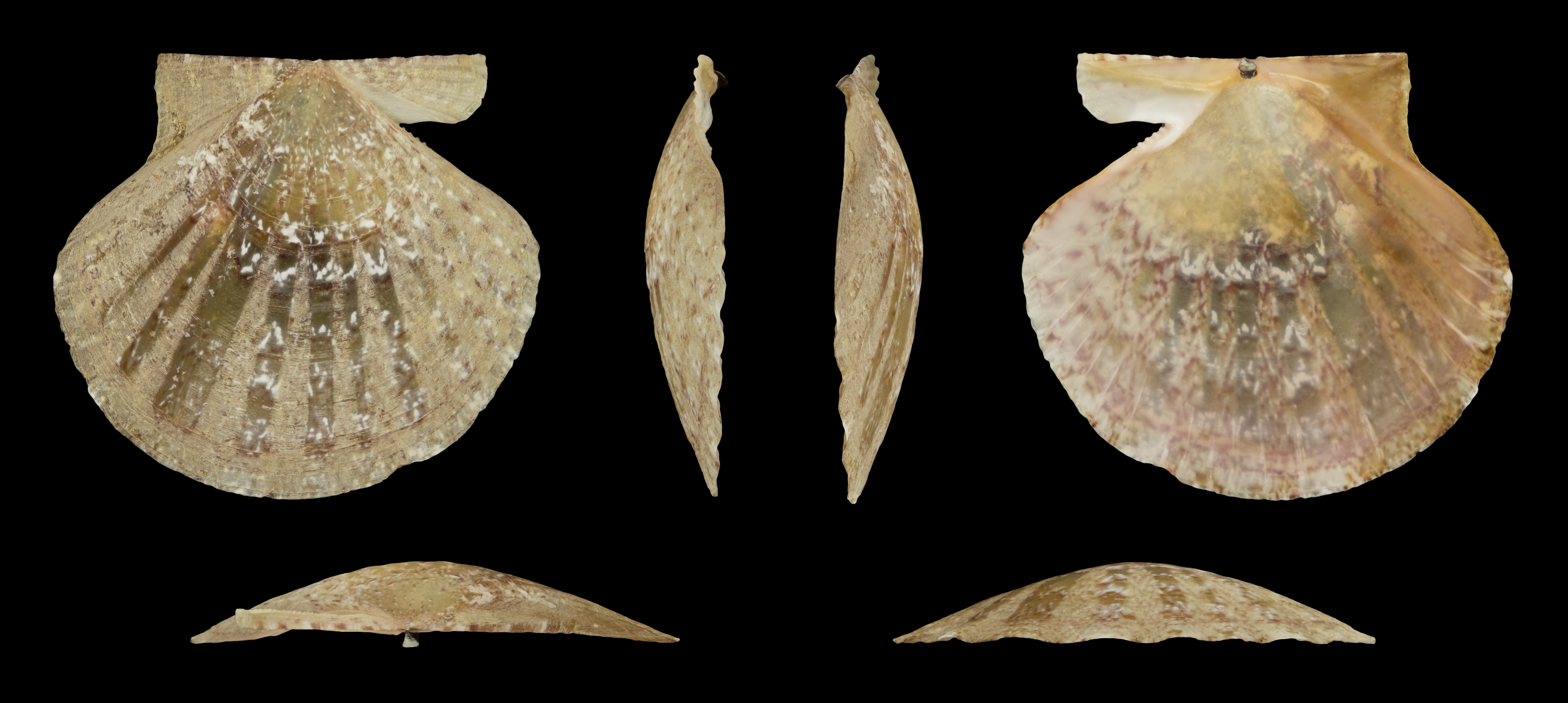
Right valve

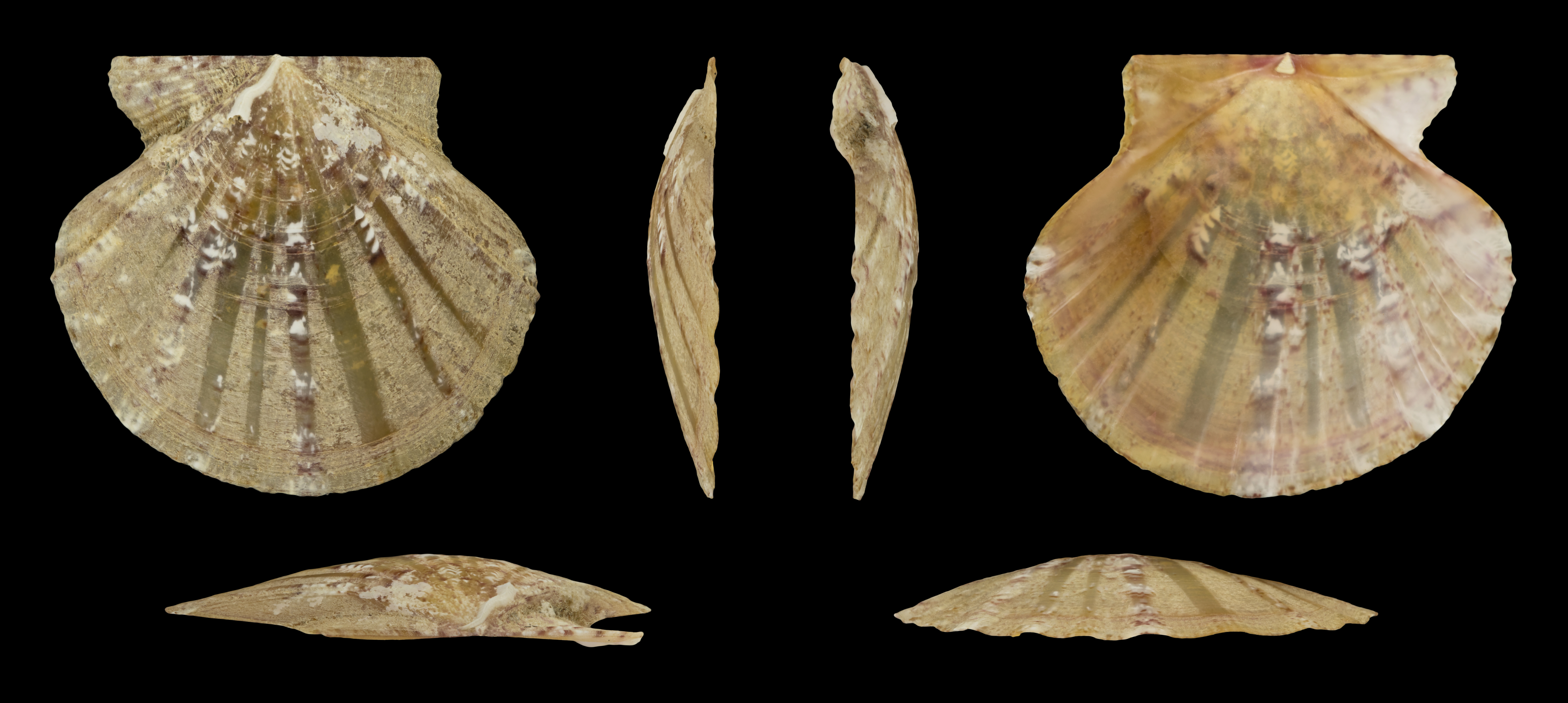
Left valve

== Distribution ==
This species can be found in the Mediterranean Sea, from Italy and Croatia to Greece, under rocks or dead leaves of algae, usually at depths of about 10 m.
