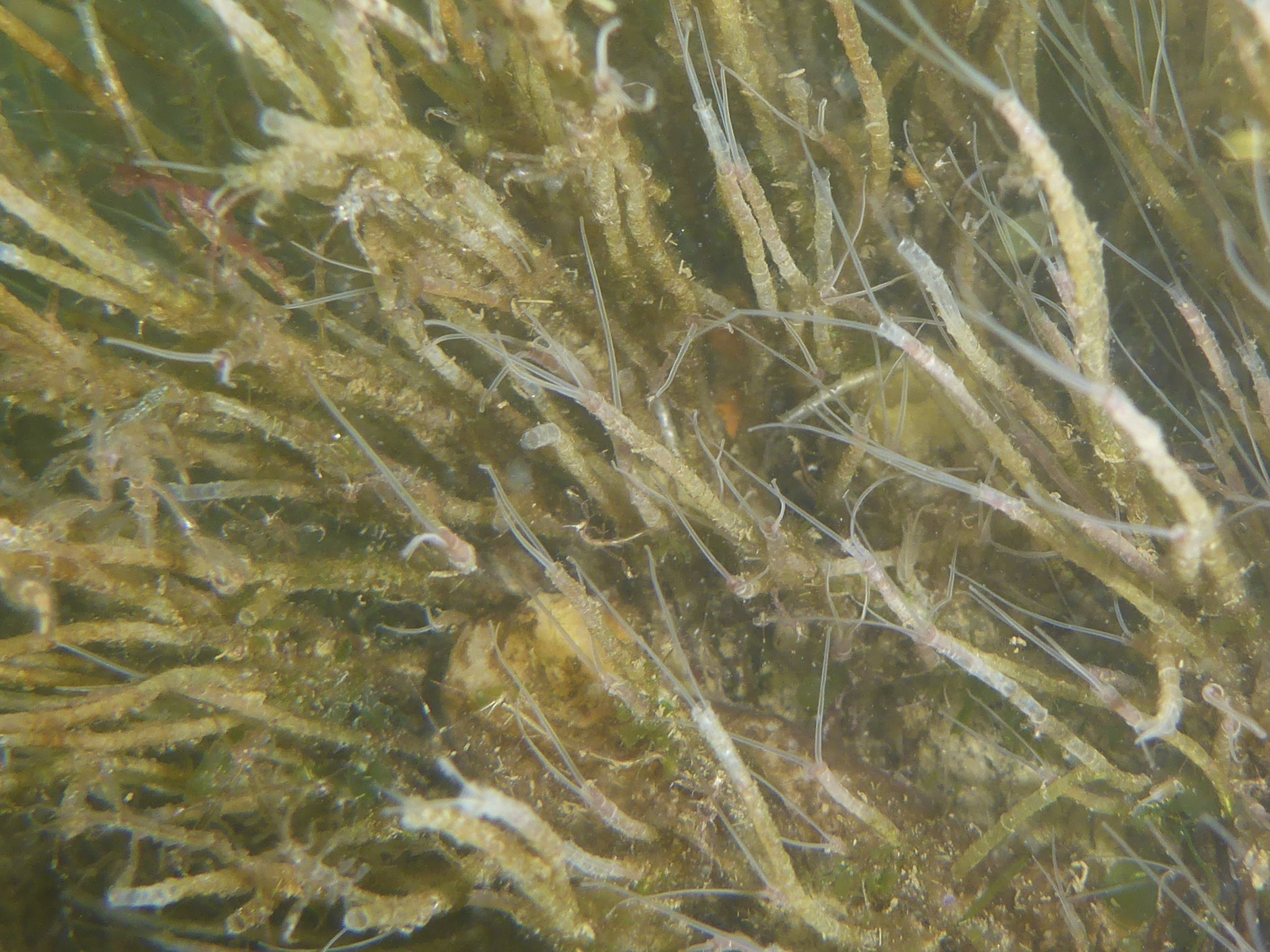
- Phyllochaetopterus prolifica

Scientific classification
- Kingdom: Animalia
- Phylum: Annelida
- Family: Chaetopteridae
- Genus: Phyllochaetopterus; Grube, 1863

Species
- See text

= Phyllochaetopterus =

Genus of annelid worms

Phyllochaetopterus is a genus of marine polychaete worms that live in tubes that they construct.

== Species ==
The following species are recognised in the genus Phyllochaetopterus:

- Phyllochaetopterus aciculigerus Crossland, 1904
- Phyllochaetopterus anglicus Potts, 1914
- Phyllochaetopterus arabicus Grube, 1870
- Phyllochaetopterus awasensis Nishi & Hsieh, 2009
- Phyllochaetopterus bhaudi Jirkov, 2001
- Phyllochaetopterus claparedii McIntosh, 1885
- Phyllochaetopterus elioti Crossland, 1903
- Phyllochaetopterus gardineri Crossland, 1904
- Phyllochaetopterus gigas Nishi & Rouse, 2014
- Phyllochaetopterus gracilis Grube, 1863
- Phyllochaetopterus hainanensis Wang & Li, 2017
- Phyllochaetopterus herdmani (Hornell in Willey, 1905)
- Phyllochaetopterus lauensis Nishi & Rouse, 2007
- Phyllochaetopterus limicolus Hartman, 1960
- Phyllochaetopterus major Claparède, 1869
- Phyllochaetopterus monroi Hartman, 1967
- Phyllochaetopterus polus Morineaux Nishi Ormos & Mouchel, 2010
- Phyllochaetopterus prolifica Potts, 1914
- Phyllochaetopterus ramosus Willey, 1905
- Phyllochaetopterus sibogae Caullery, 1944
- Phyllochaetopterus socialis Claparède, 1869
- Phyllochaetopterus verrilli Treadwell, 1943
