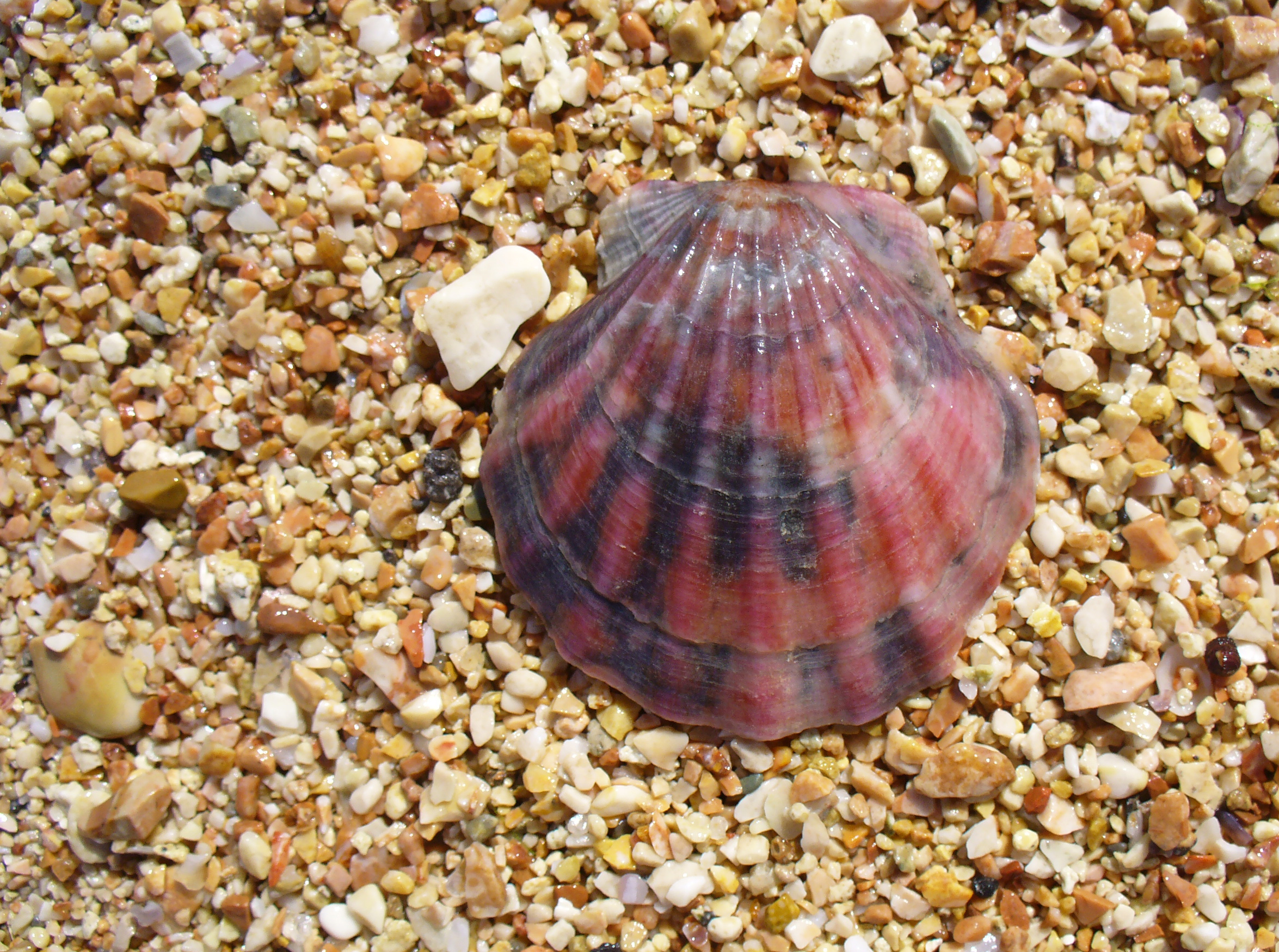
- A valve of Flexopecten glaber subspecies ponticus

Scientific classification
- Domain: Eukaryota
- Kingdom: Animalia
- Phylum: Mollusca
- Class: Bivalvia
- Order: Pectinida
- Family: Pectinidae
- Genus: Flexopecten; Sacco, 1897

= Flexopecten =

Genus of bivalves

Flexopecten is a genus of saltwater scallops, marine bivalve mollusks in the family Pectinidae, the scallops.

== Species ==
Species and subspecies within the genus Flexopecten include:

- Flexopecten felipponei (Dall, 1922)
- Flexopecten flexuosus (Poli, 1795)
- Flexopecten glaber (Linnaeus, 1758)
  - Flexopecten glaber ponticus (Bucquoy, Dautzenberg & Dollfus, 1889)
- Flexopecten hyalinus (Poli, 1795)

Synonyms:

- Flexopecten coarctatus (Born, 1778) = Flexopecten flexuosus (Poli, 1795)
- Flexopecten glaber glaber (Linnaeus, 1758) = Flexopecten glaber (Linnaeus, 1758)
- Flexopecten glaber proteus (Dillwyn, 1817) = Flexopecten glaber (Linnaeus, 1758)
- Flexopecten ponticus = Flexopecten glaber ponticus (Bucquoy, Dautzenberg & Dollfus, 1889)
- Flexopecten proteus (Dillwyn, 1817) = Flexopecten glaber (Linnaeus, 1758)
