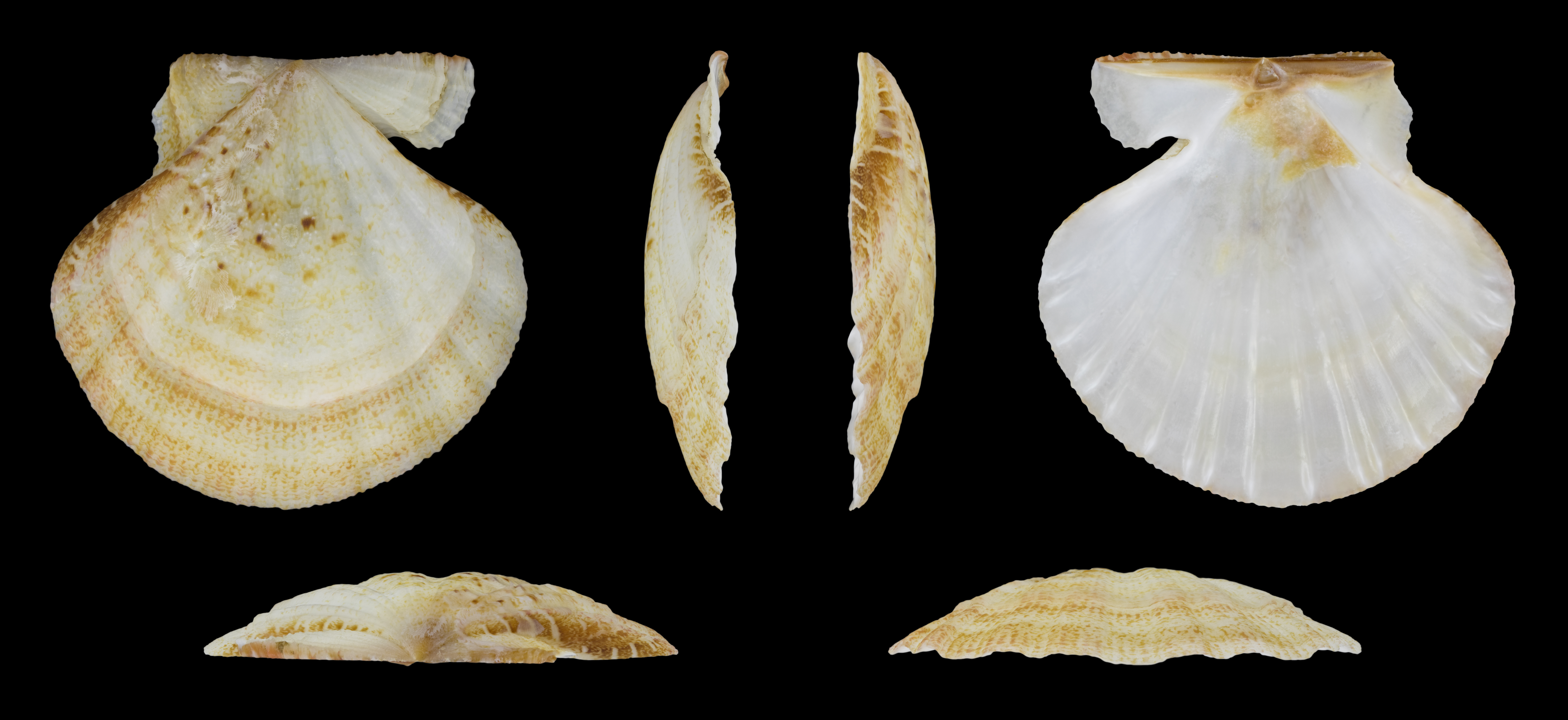

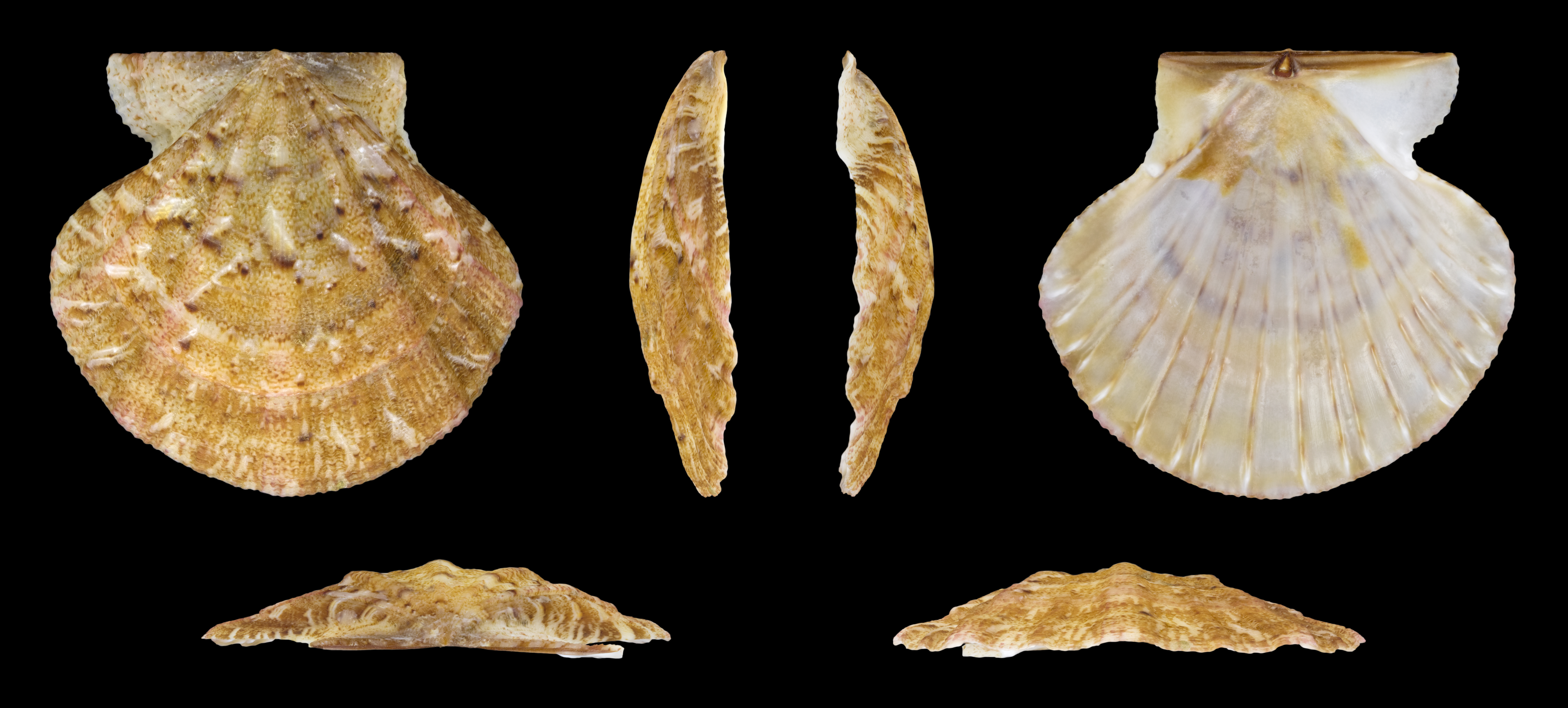

Scientific classification
- Domain: Eukaryota
- Kingdom: Animalia
- Phylum: Mollusca
- Class: Bivalvia
- Order: Pectinida
- Family: Pectinidae
- Genus: Flexopecten
- Species: F. flexuosus

Binomial name
- Flexopecten flexuosus (Poli, 1795)

= Flexopecten flexuosus =

Species of bivalve

Flexopecten flexuosus is a species of bivalve belonging to the family Pectinidae.

The species is found in numerous Western European and North African countries.
