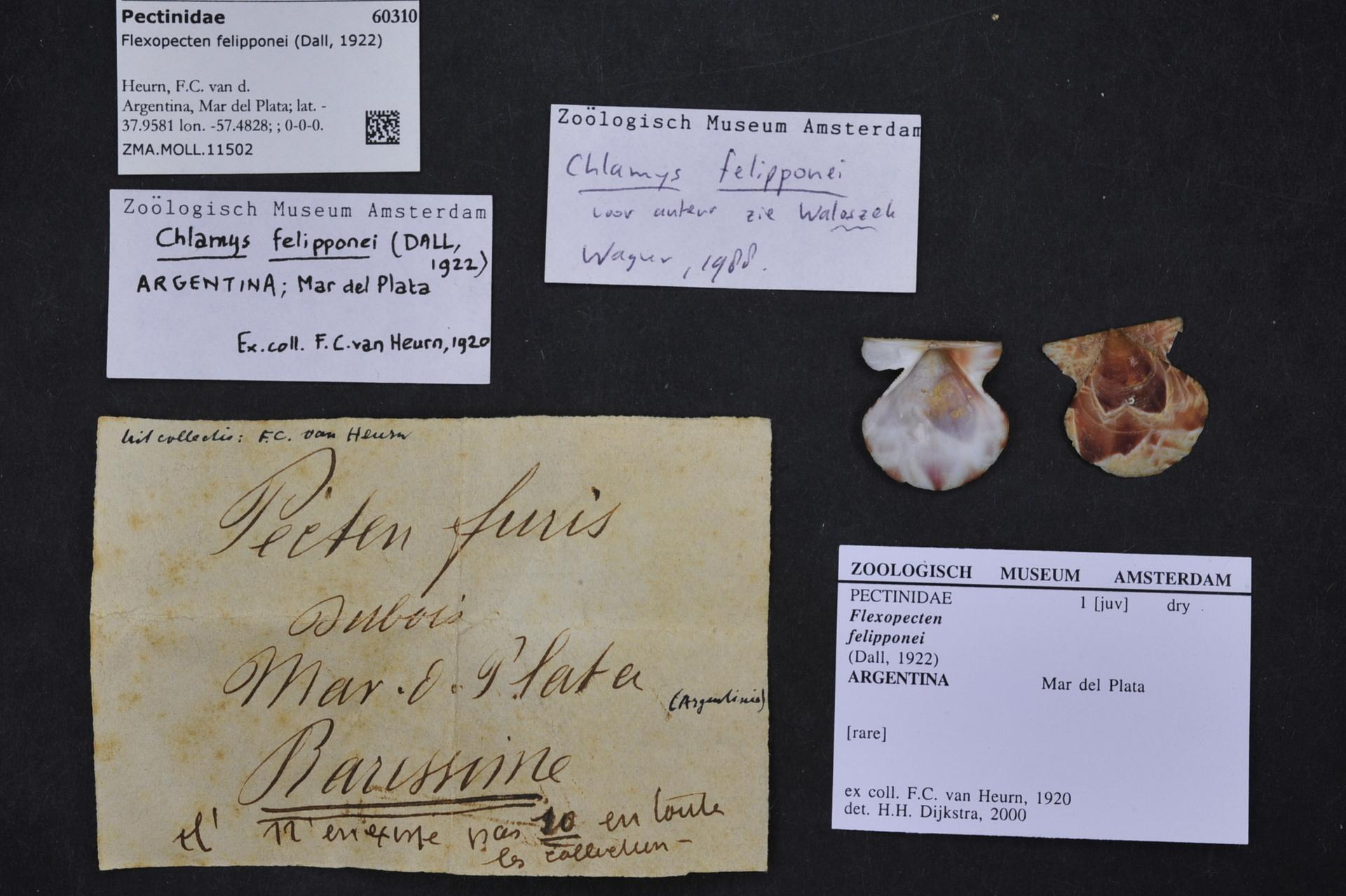

Scientific classification
- Kingdom: Animalia
- Phylum: Mollusca
- Class: Bivalvia
- Order: Pectinida
- Family: Pectinidae
- Genus: Flexopecten
- Species: F. felipponei

Binomial name
- Flexopecten felipponei (W. H. Dall, 1922)

Synonyms
- Pecten felipponei Dall, 1922

= Flexopecten felipponei =

Species of bivalve

Flexopecten felipponei is a species of saltwater scallop, a marine bivalve mollusk in the family Pectinidae, the scallops.

== Original description ==
The species Flexopecten felipponei was originally described as Pecten (Chlamys) felipponei by W. H. Dall in 1922.

The type locality is Mar de la Plata, Argentina.

Dall's original text (the type description) reads as follows:

Pecten (Chlamys) felipponei n. sp.

Shell rounded, the adult slightly oblique, rather compressed, polished, scarlet or rosaceus, usually with zigzag irregular streaks of white on the left valve; the ears paler; hinge line straight, the ears rather large, subequal, in the left valve with only incremental sculpture, in the right valve the anterior ear has four or five radial ridges more or less imbricated, and a ctenolium with five short teeth; sculpture of the left valve comprising five obscure flattened radial ribs with the interspaces obscurely radiately striate; there is no micro Dall, 1922scopic reticulation; on the right valve the ribbing is obsolete; length of shell 38; of hinge-line 28; height 40; diameter 8 mm.

The shell bears some resemblance to Kobelt's figure of P. danicus in the Conchylien Cabinet, but is on the whole a remarkably distinct species. The material studied comprises a well-known left valve (U. S. Nat. Mus. Cat. No. 333374) and in Dr. Felippone's collection another (1703) somewhat smaller, and a complete young pair (1709).
