= Mesochaetopterus =

Scientific classification
- Kingdom: Animalia
- Phylum: Annelida
- Class: Polychaeta
- Family: Chaetopteridae
- Genus: Mesochaetopterus; Potts, 1914

Genus of annelid worms

Mesochaetopterus is a genus of marine polychaete worm belonging to the family Chaetopteridae.

== Species ==
The following species are assigned to this genus:

- Mesochaetopterus alipes Monro, 1928
- Mesochaetopterus capensis (McIntosh, 1885)
- Mesochaetopterus crypticus Ben-Eliahu, 1976
- Mesochaetopterus ecuadorica Nishi, Hickman & Bailey-Brock, 2009
- Mesochaetopterus formosana Nishi & Hsieh, 2009
- Mesochaetopterus japonicus Fujiwara, 1934
- Mesochaetopterus laevis Hartmann-Schröder, 1960
- Mesochaetopterus malayensis (Caullery, 1944)
- Mesochaetopterus mexicanus Kudenov, 1975
- Mesochaetopterus minutus Potts, 1914
- Mesochaetopterus rickettsii Berkeley & Berkeley, 1941
- Mesochaetopterus rogeri Martin, Gil, Carreras-Carbonell & Bhaud, 2008
- Mesochaetopterus sagittarius (Claparède, 1870)
- Mesochaetopterus selangorus (Rullier, 1976)
- Mesochaetopterus stinapa Martin, Mecca, Meca, van Moorsel & Romano, 2022
- Mesochaetopterus taylori Potts, 1914
- Mesochaetopterus tingkokensis Zang, Rouse & Qui, 2015
- Mesochaetopterus xejubus Petersen & Fanta, 1969
- Mesochaetopterus xerecus Petersen & Fanta, 1969
