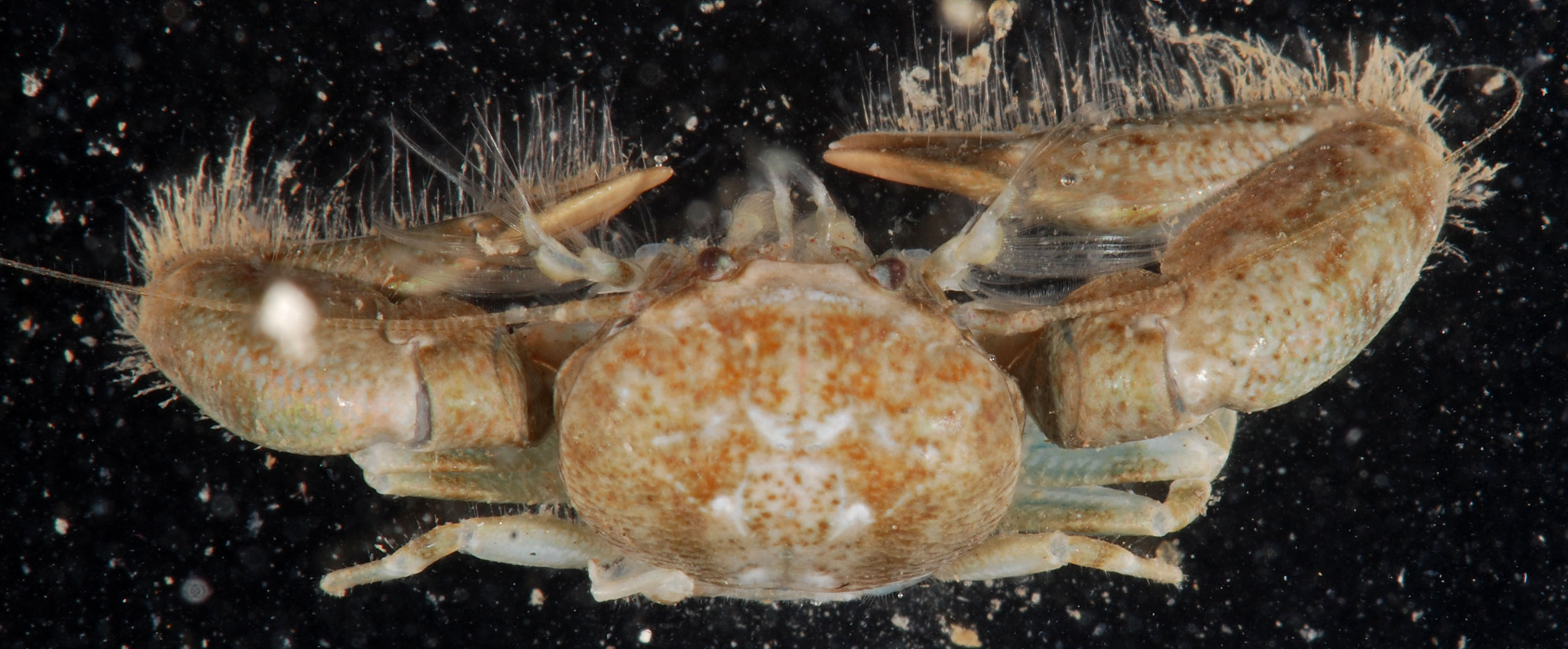

Scientific classification
- Kingdom: Animalia
- Phylum: Arthropoda
- Clade: Pancrustacea
- Class: Malacostraca
- Order: Decapoda
- Suborder: Pleocyemata
- Infraorder: Anomura
- Family: Porcellanidae
- Genus: Polyonyx
- Species: P. gibbesi

Binomial name
- Polyonyx gibbesi Haig, 1956

= Polyonyx gibbesi =

Species of crab

Polyonyx gibbesi, the eastern tube crab, is a species of porcelain crab in the family Porcellanidae. It is found in the western Atlantic Ocean.

== Distribution and habitat ==
P. gibbesi is mostly found along the western Atlantic Ocean, from Cape Cod, Massachusetts, to Uruguay. It has been found along the coast of Argentina in the stomach contents of a narrownose smooth-hound shark. Within the tropical region of this range, the porcelain crab is less common and only found sporadically.

The porcelain crab lives in sandy or muddy substrates. Once in the adult stage, they live in the tunnels of tube-dwelling annelids.

== Ecology ==
P. gibbesi has a symbiotic relationship with tube-dwelling annelid worms. They live in the tunnels of these annelids, such as those in the genus Chaetopterus, known as the parchment worms. The porcelain crabs typically live as male-female pairs within the tunnels.
