= Karen Osborn =

American annelidologist (born 1974)

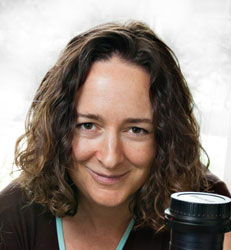
- Born: January 29, 1974 (age 52)
- Education: Andrews University; Western Washington University; University of California, Berkeley; Scripps Institution of Oceanography
- Scientific career
- Fields: Marine Invertebrate Zoology (Mid-water)
- Workplaces: Monterey Bay Aquarium Research Institute; National Museum of Natural History
- Thesis: Phylogenetics and ecology of pelagic munnopsid isopods (Crustacea, Asellota) (2007)
- Doctoral advisor: Roy Caldwell
- Author abbrev. (zoology): KJ Osborn

Karen Joyce Osborn (born January 29, 1974) is a marine scientist at the Smithsonian's National Museum of Natural History Invertebrate Zoology department. She is known for her work in marine biology specializing in mid-water invertebrates.

== Early life and education ==
During her time in high school, Osborn was interested in biology. She did not know what she wanted to study in college, but she knew she wanted to study something related to biology. At Andrews University Osborn was interested in biology and took a year long introductory course into the subject to find out what topic she was most interested in. She took a year off from college to teach in Micronesia. During her time in Micronesia she scuba dived often and became fascinated with the amount of diversity that existed in the coral reefs. She decided to study invertebrates like the ones she saw there. When she returned to college she graduated with a BS in Zoology and a minor in Chemistry. In 1999 she received her masters of science in biology from Western Washington University. For two years following this she worked at the Monterey Bay Aquarium Research Institute as a research technician. This is when she began to be interested in the midwater. In 2007 she graduated from the University of California, Berkeley with a Ph.D. in Integrative Biology. She completed her post doc at Scripps Institution of Oceanography at the University of California, San Diego.

== Career and research ==
In 2011, she became an Associate Curator at the Smithsonian's National Museum of Natural History in the invertebrate zoology department. Her work has also been recognized through several awards and honors. In 2019, Osborn received the Smithsonian Scholarly Studies Award.

Now at the National Museum of Natural History she focuses her research on marine invertebrates living in the mid water level of the ocean. She is interested in how these invertebrates have adapted to living in this environment. She enjoys incorporating art into her work and has helped train many people to make scientific illustrations. She helped create the National Museum of Natural History's exhibit called Life in One Cubic Foot, which explored the biodiversity that could be found in one cubic foot anywhere in the world, and other exhibits. She also helps organize polychaete day at the museum, an event to teach the public about polychaetes and their living environments. Most recently, in 2024, Osborn co-authored a study on the functional differences between the unusual eyes of deep-sea hyperiid amphipods.

== Select publications ==
- KJ Osborn, GW Rouse, SK Goffredi, BH Robison. 2007. Description and Relationships of Chaetopterus pugaporcinus, an Unusual Pelagic Polychaete (Annelida, Chaetopteridae). The Biological Bulletin 212 (1), 40-54.
- KJ Osborn, LA Kuhnz, IG Priede, M Urata, AV Gebruk, ND Holland. 2011. Diversification of acorn worms (Hemichordata, Enteropneusta) revealed in the deep sea. Proc. R. Soc. B, rspb20111916.
- KJ Osborn, SHD Haddock, F Pleijel, LP Madin, GW Rouse. 2009. Deep-sea, swimming worms with luminescent “bombs”. Science 325 (5943), 964-964.
- KJ Osborn. 2009. Relationships within the Munnopsidae (Crustacea, Isopoda, Asellota) based on three genes. Zoologica Scripta 38 (6), 617-635.
- IG Priede, KJ Osborn, AV Gebruk, D Jones, D Shale, A Rogacheva, ND Holland. 2012. Observations on torquaratorid acorn worms (Hemichordata, Enteropneusta) from the North Atlantic with descriptions of a new genus and three new species. Invertebrate Biology 131 (3), 244-257.
- RS Kaufmann, BH Robison, RE Sherlock, KR Reisenbichler, KJ Osborn. 2011. Composition and structure of macrozooplankton and micronekton communities in the vicinity of free-drifting Antarctic icebergs. Deep Sea Research Part II: Topical Studies in Oceanography 58 (11-12), 1469-1484.
- KJ Osborn, GW Rouse. 2011. Phylogenetics of Acrocirridae and Flabelligeridae (Cirratuliformia, Annelida). Zoologica Scripta 40 (2), 204-219.
- AG Collins, B Bentlage, GI Matsumoto, SHD Haddock, KJ Osborn, B Schierwater. 2006. Solution to the phylogenetic enigma of Tetraplatia, a worm-shaped cnidarian. Biology letters 2 (1), 120-124.
- KJ Osborn, GW Rouse. 2008. Multiple origins of pelagicism within Flabelligeridae (Annelida). Molecular Phylogenetics and Evolution 49 (2008) 386–392.
- RE Sherlock, KR Reisenbichler, SL Bush, KJ Osborn, BH Robison. 2011. Near-field zooplankton, ice-face biota and proximal hydrography of free-drifting Antarctic icebergs. Deep Sea Research Part II: Topical Studies in Oceanography 58 (11-12), 1457-1468.
