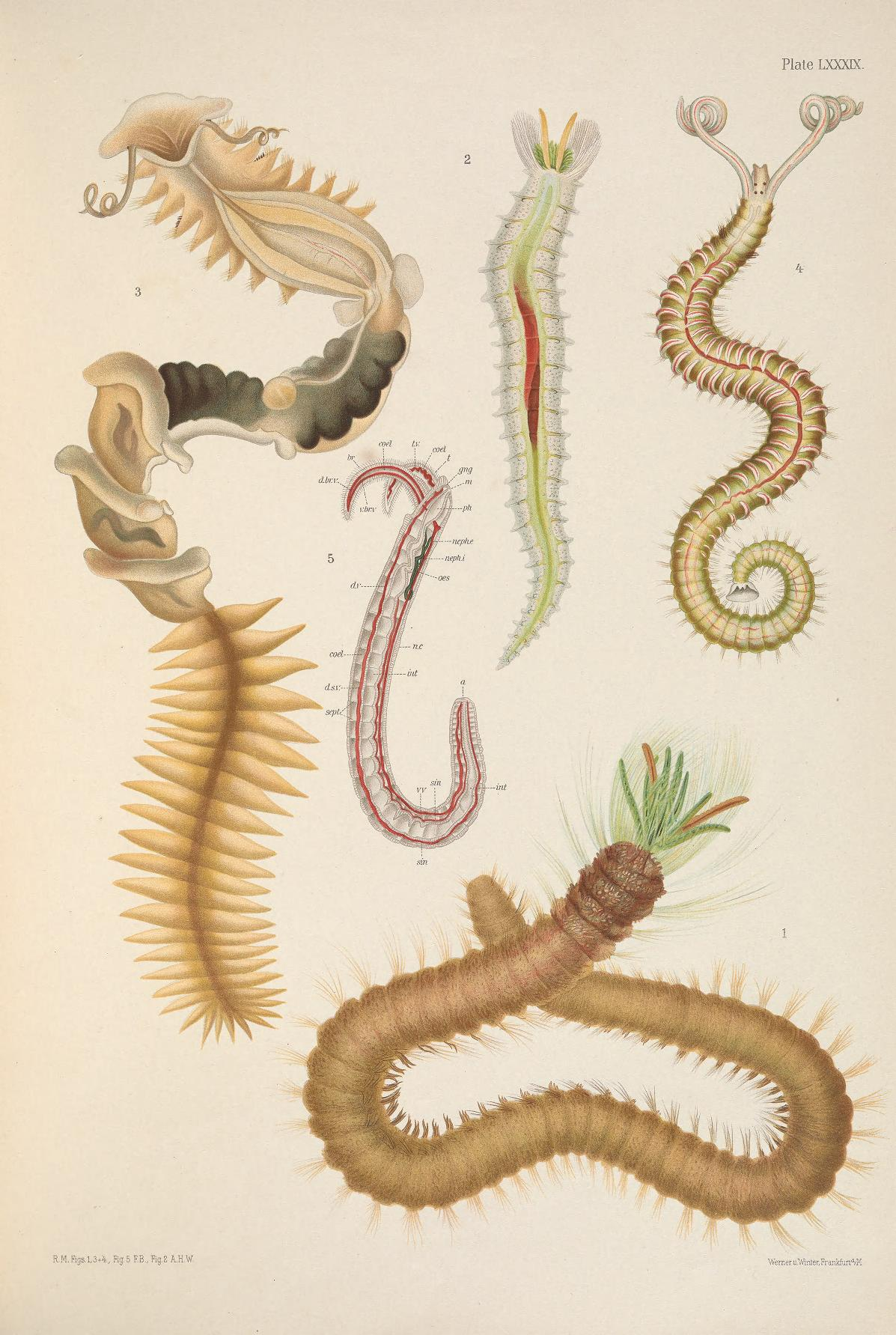
- C. variopedatus(figure 3)
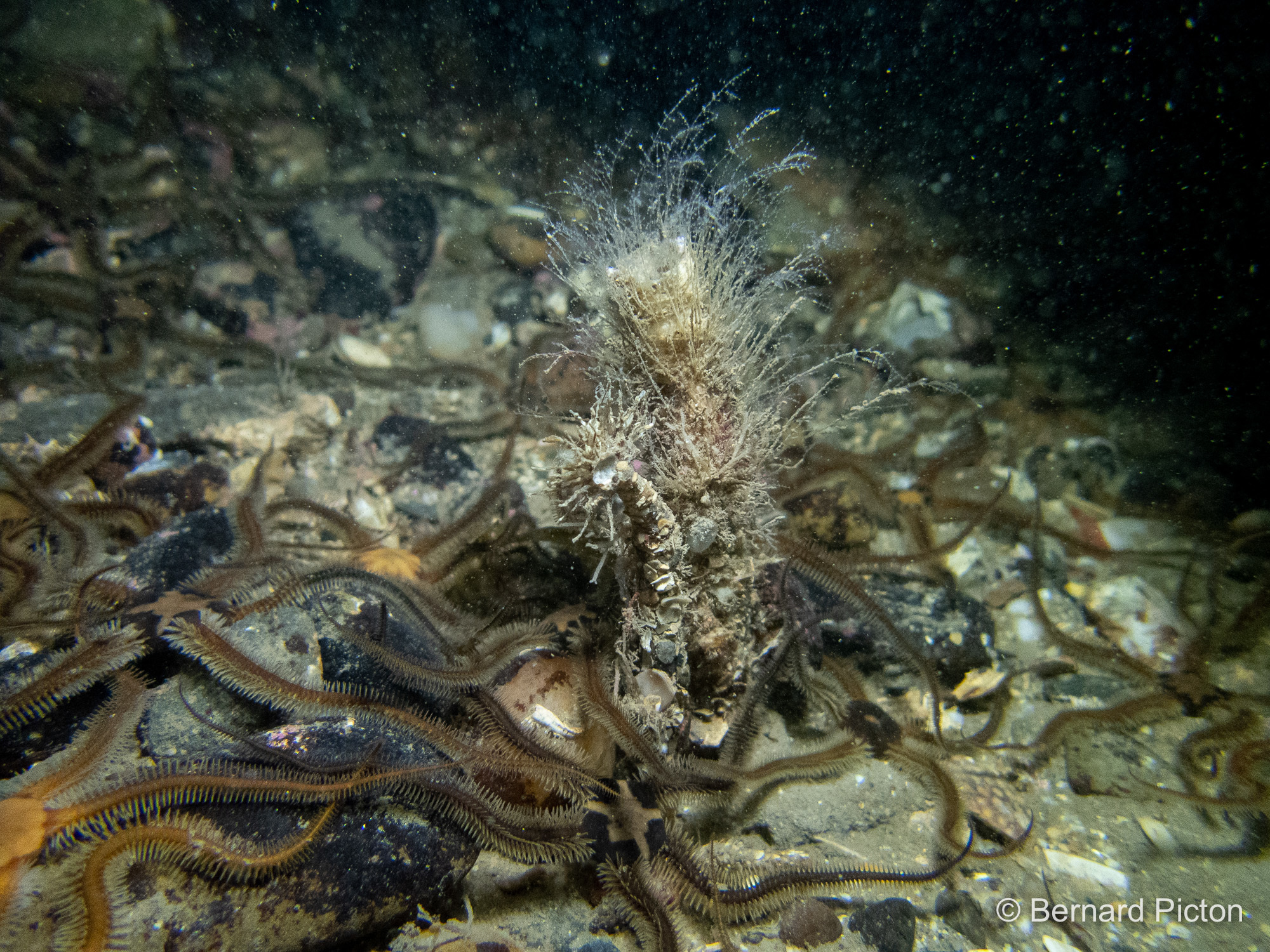
- Photo of Chaetopterus variopedatus behind the smaller Lanice conchilega

Scientific classification
- Kingdom: Animalia
- Phylum: Annelida
- Family: Chaetopteridae
- Genus: Chaetopterus
- Species: C. variopedatus

Binomial name
- Chaetopterus variopedatus Renier, 1804

Synonyms
- C. australis Quatrefages, 1866; C. crosslandi Caullery, 1944; C. insignis Baird, 1864; C. longimanus Crossland, 1904; C. valencinii Quatrefages, 1866; Tricoelia variopedatus Renier, 1804

= Chaetopterus variopedatus =

Species of annelid worm

Chaetopterus variopedatus is a species of parchment worm, a marine polychaete in the family Chaetopteridae. It is found worldwide. However, recent discoveries from molecular phylogeny analysis show that Chaetopterus variopedatus sensu Hartman (1959) is not a single species.

Polychaetes, or marine bristle worms, have elongated bodies divided into many segments. Each segment may bear setae (bristles) and parapodia (paddle-like appendages). Some species live freely, either swimming, crawling or burrowing, and these are known as "errant". Others live permanently in tubes, either calcareous or parchment-like, and these are known as "sedentary".

== Description ==
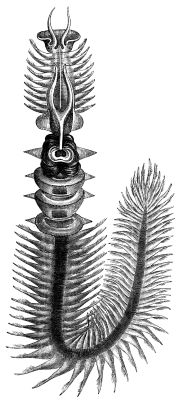
Chaetopterus sp.

Chaetopterus variopedatus builds and lives permanently in a tough, flexible, papery U-shaped tube buried in soft substrate with both ends protruding like little chimneys. The worm itself is segmented, pale coloured and up to twenty-five centimetres long. The anterior end is short and has bristle-bearing segments and a shovel-like mouth. The middle section bears parapodia. On the 12th segment these are modified into long wing-like structures which secrete mucus and form a bag. The parapodia on segments 13, 14 and 15 are fused into three paddle-shaped, piston-like structures, the purpose of which is to pump water through the tube. The water is drawn in through the anterior end and expelled through the posterior end, passing through the fine mesh of the mucus bag where food particles get trapped. The mucus bag is later rolled up and passed by a conveyor belt of whipping hairs in the ciliated dorsal groove to the mouth where it is swallowed whole. The posterior half of the worm is segmented and tapers towards the rear, bearing appendages on each segment.

== Distribution and habitat ==
Chaetopterus variopedatus has a cosmopolitan distribution, occurring in shallow coastal habitats in both temperate and tropical locations throughout the world. It is plentiful around the coasts of Britain and Ireland but is absent from the east coast of England south of the Tees estuary. The tough permanent tubes are found buried in sand and gravel in the littoral and sub-littoral zones. At greater depths they are found adhering to bedrock, in crevices and under boulders.

In New Zealand there have been many recent reports of the parchment-like tubes of Chaetopterus littering beaches, especially after storms. Since about 1995, large areas of shallow sea have been invaded by the worm, believed to be C. variopedatus. By covering the sandy bottom with a dense mat of tubes, the parchment worm makes life very difficult for the native bottom-dwelling fauna. Other marine worms, clams and starfish have been squeezed out, but the big-belly seahorse (Hippocampus abdominalis) has thrived as it finds extra prey in the tiny mysid shrimps and other crustaceans it finds between the tubes and can anchor itself by its tail to prevent itself being swept away.

== Biology ==
A female C. variopedatus can produce and liberate a batch of 150,000 to 1 million eggs into the sea. After fertilisation, the developing larvae become part of the plankton, drifting and feeding for some weeks until they settle out. The development of C. variopedatus follows an unusual pattern in that those segments destined to become part of the mid-body region have accelerated development as compared with the anterior segments. This heterochrony is not seen in other polychaete worms.

== Ecology ==
Several species of crabs have adopted the tubes of C. variopedatus as their home with Pinnixa chaetopterana, Polyonyx gibbesi and certain Pisidia species living almost exclusively within the tubes although they do not share a tube with each other. It is likely that the crabs gain protection from predators within the tubes and possibly food from the host worm.

Bottom-feeding fish and crustaceans probably prey on C. variopedatus but the worm is made less accessible by the fact that it never emerges from its tube which is safely buried beneath the surface of the substrate. If it becomes injured, this worm has the ability to regenerate its entire body from a single segment. Another anti-predator strategy involves emitting a luminescent cloud of mucus from its tube.
