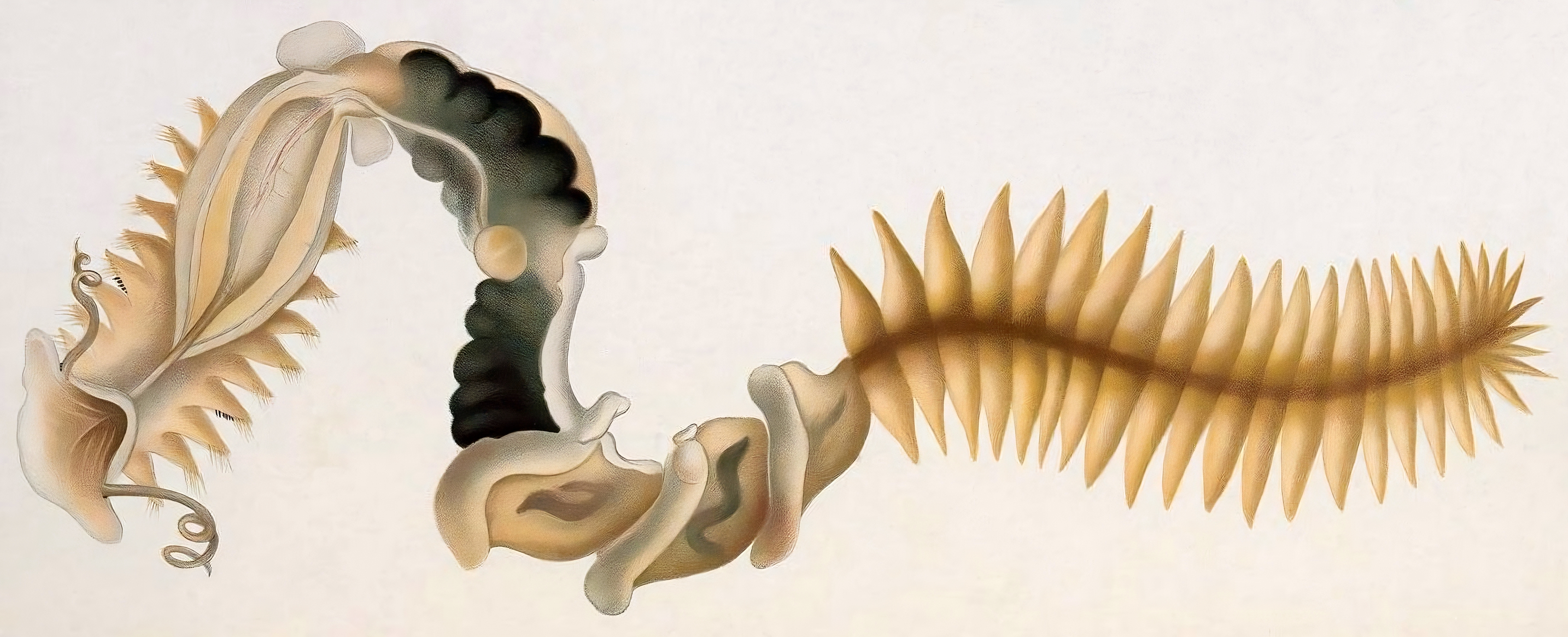
- Chaetopterus variopedatus (Renier, 1804)

Scientific classification
- Kingdom: Animalia
- Phylum: Annelida
- Family: Chaetopteridae; Audouin & Milne Edwards, 1833

Genera
- See text

= Chaetopteridae =

Family of annelid worms

The Chaetopteridae are a family of marine filter-feeding polychaete worms that live in vertical or U-shaped tubes in tunnels buried in the sedimentary or hard substrate of marine environments. The worms are highly adapted to the hard tube they secrete. Inside the tube the animal is segmented and regionally specialized, with highly modified appendages on different segments for cutting the tunnel, feeding, or creating suction for the flow of water through the tube home. The modified segments for feeding are on the 12th segment from the head for members of this family.

== Larvae ==
Chaetopteridae larvae are the largest among the polychaete worms. The larvae will range in size from 0.4 mm to 2.5 mm (largest polychaete larvae reported having a maximum length of 12 mm; the late stage of an unknown phyllodocid species). Chaetopteridae larvae are barrel-like in form with one to two ciliated bands at the midsection. They also have a large buccal funnel. These larvae are often long lived and effectively disseminate, although are constrained geographically to their appropriate ranges for successful adult growth. The most common form of larval developmental plan for polychaetes is the trochophore larvae. The trochophore will add segments sequentially from a posterior growth zone to produce a nectochaete larva. Chaetopterus represents a distinct deviation from this general design. At no point in larval growth stages does the metatrochophore take on the clearly segmented form of the typical nectochaete larva. The 15 segments of Chaetopterus are formed by subdivision of existing anlage.

== Feeding ==
The Chaetopteridae have several genera with peculiar and well-studied filter-feeding mechanisms. The genera Chaetopterus, Mesochaetopterus, and Spiochaetopterus feed using a thin mucus net suspended across the upper portion of their tube. The mucus net is secreted by a hooplike structure called the aliform notopodia arch. The net can grow at a rate as great as one millimeter per second as water currents generated by the notopodial fans pass plankton through the net. When the net grows large enough it contacts the ciliated cup, which rolls up the net. When the roll becomes large the net is disconnected from the aliform notopodia and is rolled into a ball before the ciliated mid-dorsal groove transports it to the mouth.

== Affinity ==
Molecular analysis suggests that this group is basal within the annelids, below the sipunculid worms.

== Genera ==
The World Register of Marine Species lists the following genera as being in the family:

- Chaetopterus Cuvier, 1830
- Mesochaetopterus Potts, 1914
- Mesotrocha Leuckart & Pagenstecher in Leuckart, 1855
- Phyllochaetopterus Grube, 1863
- Spiochaetopterus M Sars, 1856
