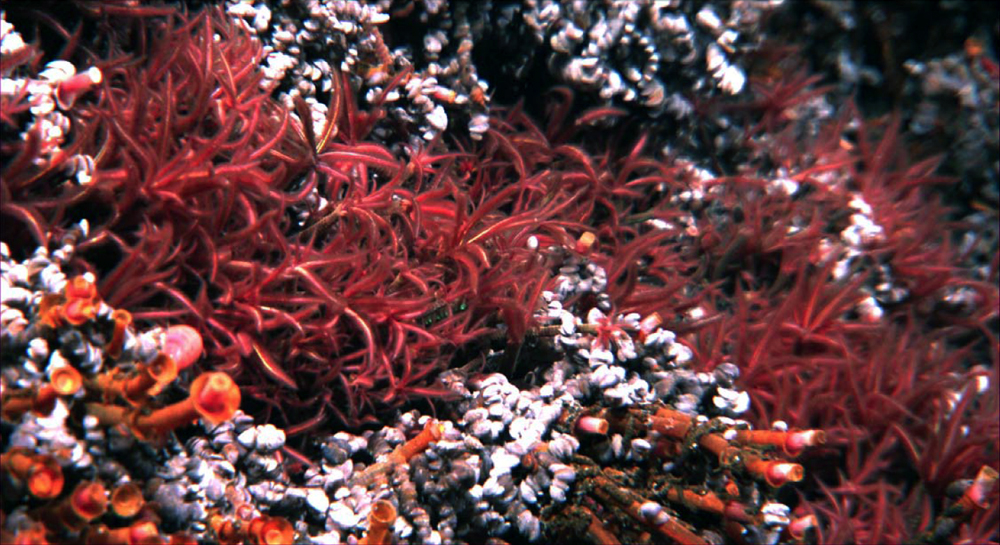

Scientific classification
- Kingdom: Animalia
- Phylum: Annelida
- Clade: Pleistoannelida
- Clade: Sedentaria
- Order: Terebellida
- Family: Alvinellidae
- Genus: Paralvinella
- Species: P. sulfincola

Binomial name
- Paralvinella sulfincola Desbruyères & Laubier, 1993

= Paralvinella sulfincola =

Species of annelid

Paralvinella sulfincola, also known as the Sulfide worm, is a species of polychaete worm of the Alvinellidae family that thrives on undersea hot-water vents. It dwells within tubes in waters surrounding hydrothermal vents, close to super-heated fluids reaching over 300 °C (572 °F). The upper thermal limit for this polychaete is unknown; however, it is unlikely they can survive in constant temperatures over 50 °C (122 °F). It may tentatively be named a metazoan extremophile or, more specifically, a thermophile.

Their unique abilities to withstand high temperatures close to hydrothermal fluids enables them to prey upon sulphur-oxidising bacterial mats which grow close to the metal rich vent plume.

== Morphology ==
Paralvinella sulfincola colonizes smoker chimneys found near deep sea ridges in aggregations or singly upon vents. They grow up to a length of about 20-70 mm and secrete mucus in the form of a tube with two openings. This tube serves as a home, not only for the worm, but also for a whole host of microbial organisms on which the worm feeds. The worm has a crown of branchial filaments on the anterior side of its body that it uses for gas exchange. Among polychaetes, P. sulfincola’s crown has the largest surface area. The branchial crown usually peeks out when the worm is inside its tube in what is thought to be its resting state. The worm also has buccal tentacles, which it uses for feeding.

== Behavior ==
While the worms spend most of their time inside of their tubes with their branchial crowns peeking out, they do engage in various behaviors such as the exploration of the environment surrounding their tube and occasional contact with surrounding worms. Exploration of the environment surrounding their tube involves the worm partially inside its tube. It utilizes its branchial filaments to brush across the surface of the chimney, and sometimes extends the upper parts of its body to sweep out across the tube entrance. Other times, the worm can be almost fully extended, with only its tail-end hidden inside the tube. This exploration behavior is mainly for the purpose of finding food. During these explorations, the worm’s buccal tentacles are extended over the surface of the chimney or the worm’s tube. The sweeping motion the worm exhibits is thought to free up particles from these surfaces.

Direct contact with other worms comes in the form of either one worm brushing its branchial filaments against another worm or an instigator worm using its body to strike its con-specific. This contact is usually interpreted as aggressive, as both worms withdraw to their respective tubes afterwards, and is likely a way for the worms to maintain their feeding territory. In this respect, it seems that size matters, as bigger worms are able to maintain a larger area than their smaller conspecifics. The worms hardly leave their tubes, and when they did, it was mostly in response to habitat disturbance. One other possibility for worm migration is the decrease in food availability in the worm’s general area.

== Habitat ==
Paralvinella sulfincola are mostly found on the chimneys that form near the Juan de Fuca Ridge on the Northwestern Pacific. Chimney formation happens in two main phases. In the first phase, hot seawater that is intensely saturated with calcium sulfate emerges from the seafloor and deposits anhydrite minerals into a porous, chimney-like structure. In the second phase, sulfide minerals replace the initial anhydrite minerals as the chimney gets thicker. P. sulfincola starts to colonize the chimney during this second phase and it contributes to the chimney’s chemical environment by forming a marcasite crust on the chimney as the worms build their tubes. It is thought that the elemental sulfur found in the worms’ tube mucus react with the sulfides present to form this marcasite material.

The temperatures generated on and surrounding the hydrothermal vent limit the kinds of species that can live on it: the surrounding water nears freezing temperatures, but the vent itself is a source of extreme heat. As a result, the species living on the vents must be able to tolerate a wide range of temperatures. P. sulfincola is among the most eurythermal of the marine invertebrates, with the worm remaining active at a range of 3–37 °C (37–99 °F). It is also able to survive up to temperatures as high as 55 °C (131 °F). Activity in this species seems to decrease as temperature increases. One theory for this is that food is more abundant in warmer temperatures, and so the worm does not need to forage much and can remain stationary.

== See also ==
- Pompeii worm
