= Diplochaetetes longitubus =

Scientific classification
- Kingdom: Animalia
- Phylum: Annelida
- Clade: Pleistoannelida
- Clade: Sedentaria
- Order: Terebellida
- Family: Cirratulidae
- Genus: †Diplochaetetes
- Species: †D. longitubus

Binomial name
- †Diplochaetetes longitubus Weissermel, 1913

Species of annelid worms

Diplochaetetes longitubus is an extinct species of cirratulid polychaete within the genus Diplochaetetes known from Namibian sedimentary rocks dating back to the Eocene. It was initially described as a tabulate coral, but research carried out on present-day Dodecaceria aggregates and Diplochaetetes mexicanus fossils from the pacific coasts of the Americas has led researchers to classify the entire genus as cirratulid polychaetes. For many decades, they've also been erroneously attributed to sponges.

A subspecies named Diplochaetetes longitubus vermicularis was also later described from Eocene Namibian sediments.

Although present-day Dodecaceria and fossil Diplochaetetes aggregates from Peru have been confirmed to show identical double-phased biomineralization characteristics, no detailed analysis has been performed on their Namibian counterparts so it's unclear whether the trait is shared on a broad genus basis.
