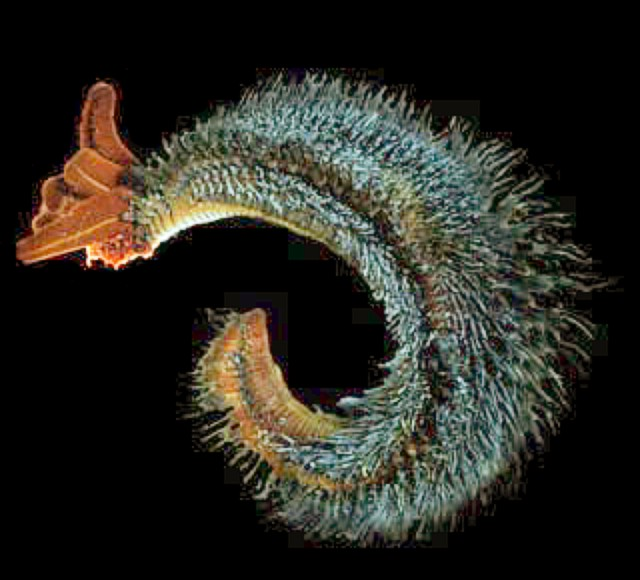
- Alvinella pompejana

Scientific classification
- Kingdom: Animalia
- Phylum: Annelida
- Clade: Pleistoannelida
- Clade: Sedentaria
- Order: Terebellida
- Family: Alvinellidae
- Genus: Alvinella; Desbruyères & Laubier, 1980

= Alvinella =

Genus of annelids

Alvinella is a genus of annelids belonging to the family Alvinellidae.

The species of this genus are found in Southeastern Asia and Northern America.

Species:

- Alvinella caudata Desbruyères & Laubier, 1986
- Alvinella pompejana Desbruyères & Laubier, 1980
