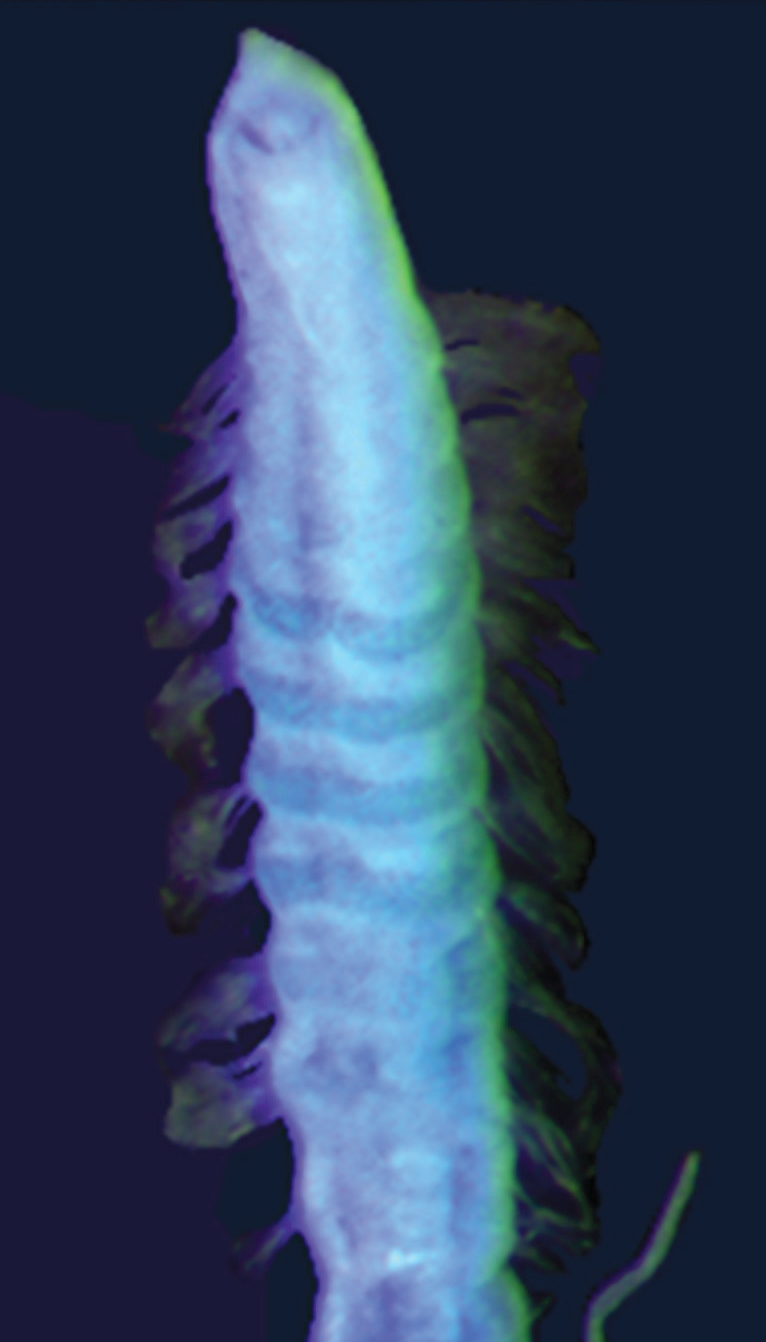

Scientific classification
- Kingdom: Animalia
- Phylum: Annelida
- Clade: Pleistoannelida
- Clade: Sedentaria
- Order: Terebellida
- Family: Cirratulidae
- Genus: Aphelochaeta
- Species: A. striata

Binomial name
- Aphelochaeta striata Dean & Blake, 2016

= Aphelochaeta striata =

Species of annelid worm

Aphelochaeta striata is a species of bitentaculate cirratulidan first found in the Pacific coast of Costa Rica, at a shallow subtidal depth of about 11 to 28 metres (36 to 92 ft) in the Gulf of Nicoya. It is characterised by possessing a narrow body and transverse blue stripes across the venter of its setigers 5 through 8 (visible via methyl green staining).
