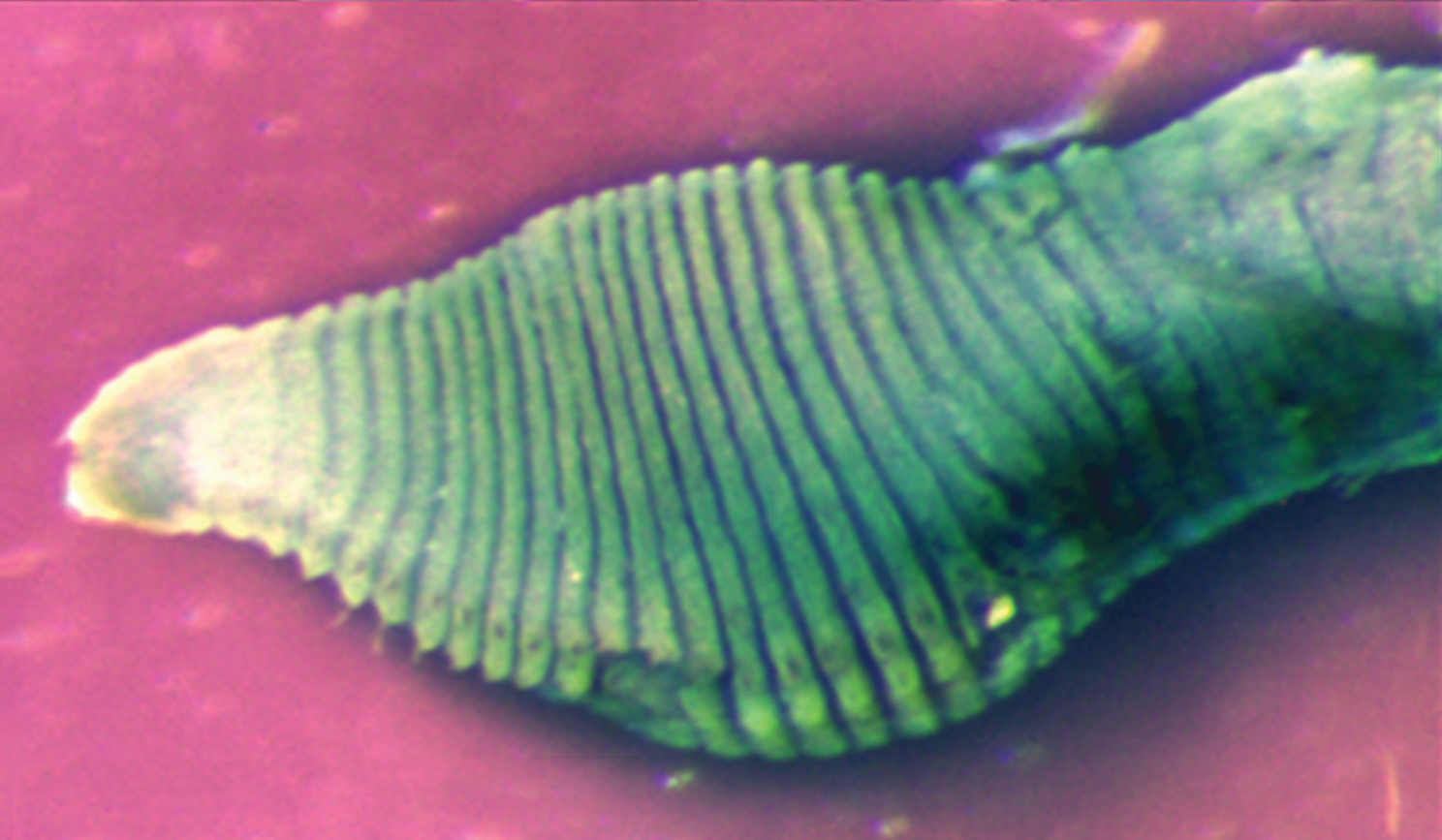

Scientific classification
- Kingdom: Animalia
- Phylum: Annelida
- Clade: Pleistoannelida
- Clade: Sedentaria
- Order: Terebellida
- Family: Cirratulidae
- Genus: Aphelochaeta
- Species: A. zebra

Binomial name
- Aphelochaeta zebra Dean & Blake, 2016

= Aphelochaeta zebra =

Species of annelid worm

Aphelochaeta zebra is a species of bitentaculate cirratulidan first found in the Pacific coast of Costa Rica, at a coral reef in Golfo Dulce. It is characterised by possessing an expanded posterior end and by its darkly-staining intersegmental regions (via methyl green staining).
