= Cirriformia tentaculata =

Scientific classification
- Kingdom: Animalia
- Phylum: Annelida
- Clade: Pleistoannelida
- Clade: Sedentaria
- Order: Terebellida
- Family: Cirratulidae
- Genus: Cirriformia
- Species: C. tentaculata

Binomial name
- Cirriformia tentaculata (Montagu, 1808)

Species of annelid worm

Cirriformia tentaculata, is a species of marine polychaete worm in the family Cirratulidae.

== Description ==
Cirriformia tentaculata grows to up to 10 cm in total length. They are soft bodied worms which lie buried in sand or mud or between mussels. Only the long tangled red gills and soft food gathering tentacles are visible.

== Distribution ==
These animals are found off the southern African coast from Angola to Mozambique and are found subtidally to 20m underwater.

== Synonyms ==
The following species are synonyms of Cirriformia tentaculata:

- Audouinia tentaculata (Montagu, 1808) (junior synonym)
- Cirratulus atrocollaris Grube, 1877 (subjective synonym)
- Cirratulus borealis Rathke, 1843
- Cirratulus comosus Marenzeller, 1879 (subjective synonym)
- Cirratulus lamarckii Audouin & Milne Edwards, 1834 (subjective synonym)
- Cirratulus pallidus Treadwell, 1931 (subjective synonym)
- Cirrhatulus lamarckii Audouin & Milne Edwards, 1834 (subjective synonym)
- Terebella tentaculata Montagu, 1808 (synonym)
