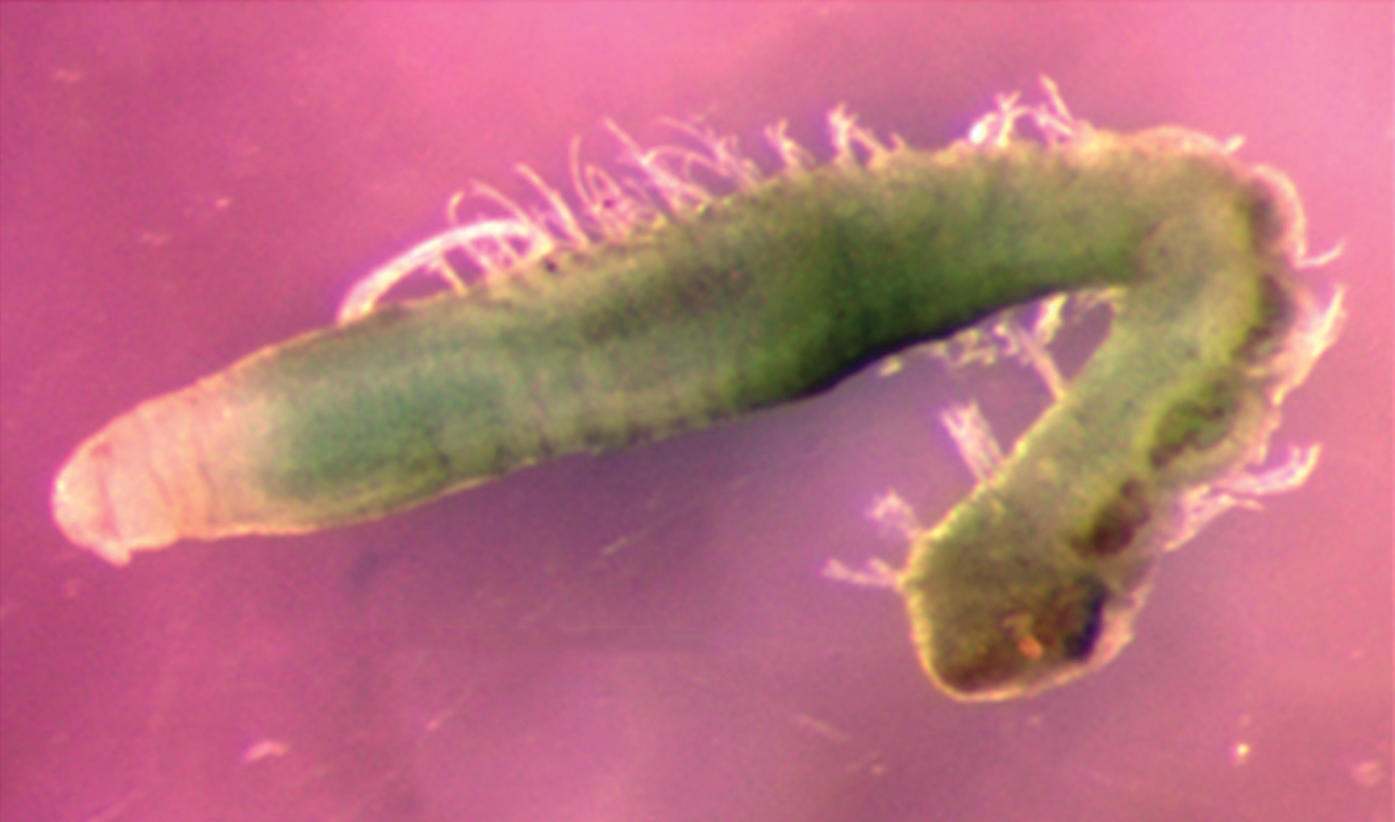

Scientific classification
- Kingdom: Animalia
- Phylum: Annelida
- Clade: Pleistoannelida
- Clade: Sedentaria
- Order: Terebellida
- Family: Cirratulidae
- Genus: Aphelochaeta
- Species: A. antelonga

Binomial name
- Aphelochaeta antelonga Dean & Blake, 2016

= Aphelochaeta antelonga =

Bitentaculate cirratulidan

Aphelochaeta antelonga is a species of bitentaculate cirratulidan first found in the Pacific coast of Costa Rica, at a shallow subtidal depth of about 11 to 18 metres (36 to 59 ft) in the Gulf of Nicoya. It is characterised by possessing a long biannulate peristomium and fibrillated capillary setae.
