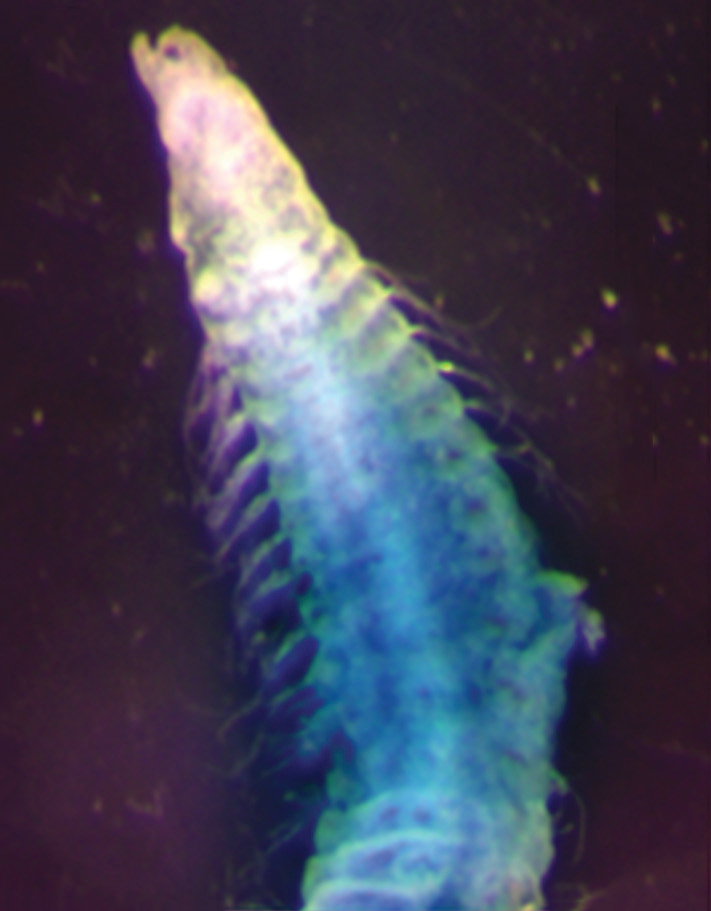

Scientific classification
- Kingdom: Animalia
- Phylum: Annelida
- Clade: Pleistoannelida
- Clade: Sedentaria
- Order: Terebellida
- Family: Cirratulidae
- Genus: Aphelochaeta
- Species: A. guimondi

Binomial name
- Aphelochaeta guimondi Dean & Blake, 2016

= Aphelochaeta guimondi =

Species of annelid worm

Aphelochaeta guimondi is a species of bitentaculate cirratulidan first found in the Pacific coast of Costa Rica, at a shallow subtidal depth of about 11 to 26 metres (36 to 85 ft) in the Gulf of Nicoya. It is characterised by possessing a wide dorsal trough in its thorax and hirsute capillaries.
