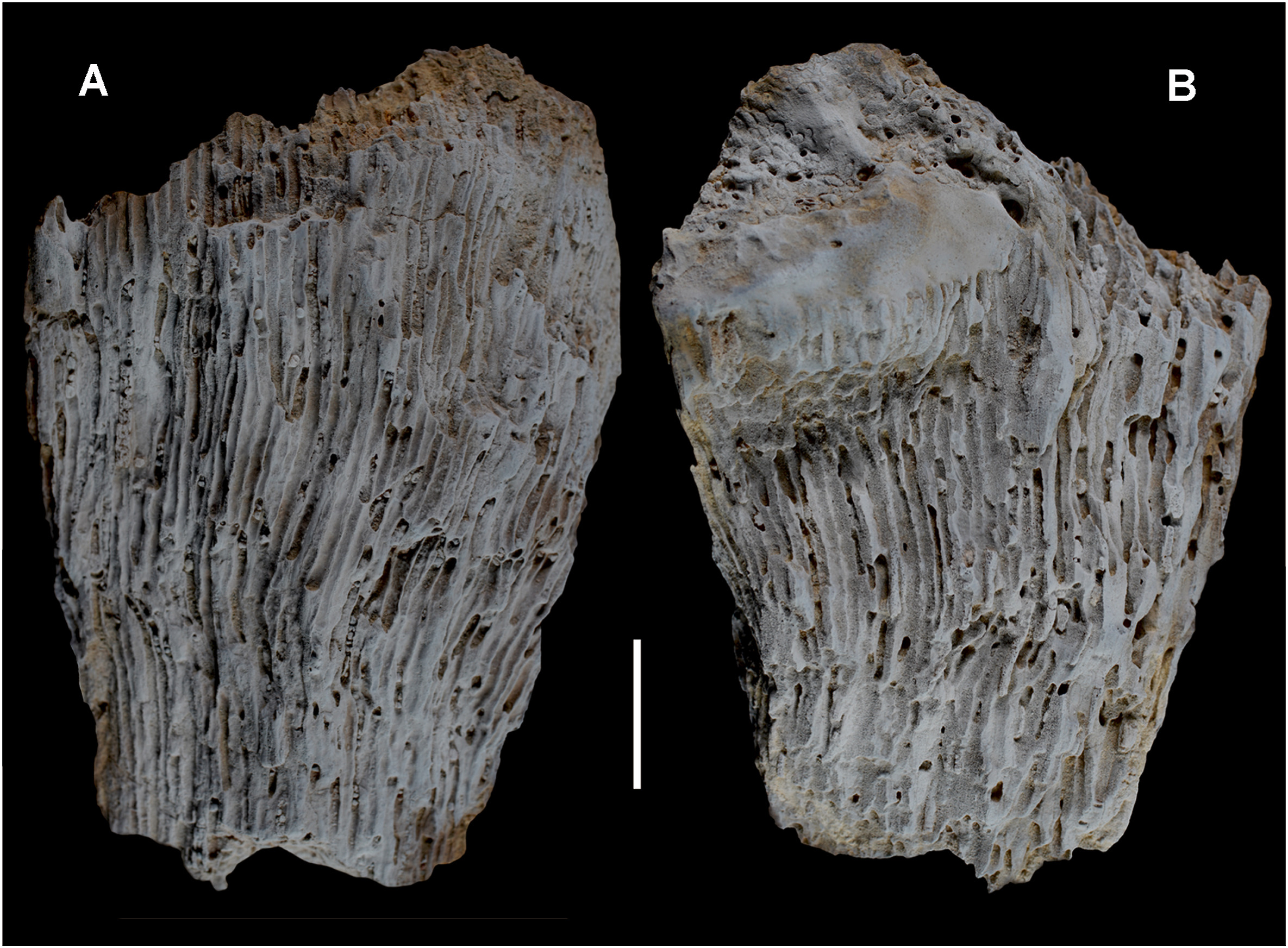
- Diplochaetetes mexicanus

Scientific classification
- Kingdom: Animalia
- Phylum: Annelida
- Clade: Pleistoannelida
- Clade: Sedentaria
- Order: Terebellida
- Family: Cirratulidae
- Genus: †Diplochaetetes
- Species: †D. mexicanus

Binomial name
- †Diplochaetetes mexicanus Wilson, 1986

= Diplochaetetes mexicanus =

Species of annelid worms

Diplochaetetes mexicanus is an extinct species of cirratulid polychaete within the genus Diplochaetetes from the Pacific coasts of the Americas, found mostly in Oligocene and Miocene sedimentary rocks. Its first reported occurrence was in Baja California sediments, hence the name. Later findings have extended its paleogeographic distribution up to Peru. Initially described as a sponge, the similarity of these aggregates with present-day Dodecaceria bioconstructions from the exact same areas has led researchers to classify these fossils as cirratulid bioconstructions. Both fossil Diplochaetetes and recent Dodecaceria bioconstructions retain identical double-phased biomineralization characteristics, but the possible synonymity of these species is currently subject to debate.

Up until the discovery of Diplochaetetes mexicanus, fossil cirratulid bioconstructions were only known from Eocene sediments in Namibia.
