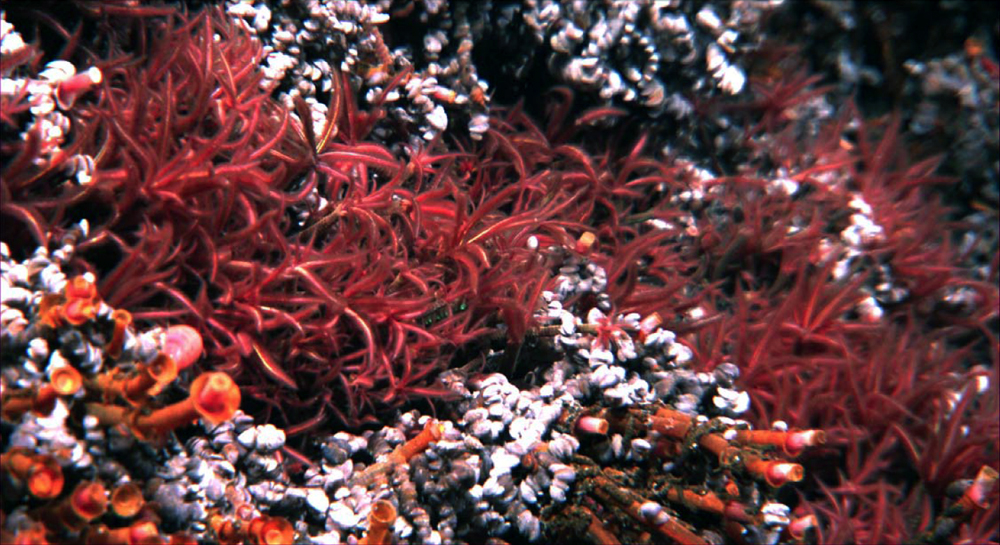
- Paralvinella sulfincola

Scientific classification
- Kingdom: Animalia
- Phylum: Annelida
- Clade: Pleistoannelida
- Clade: Sedentaria
- Order: Terebellida
- Family: Alvinellidae; Desbruyères & Laubier, 1986

Genera
- Alvinella; Paralvinella

= Alvinellidae =

Family of annelid worms

The Alvinellidae are a family of small, deep-sea polychaete worms endemic to hydrothermal vents in the Pacific Ocean. Belonging to the order Terebellida, the family contains two genera, Alvinella and Paralvinella; the former genus contains two valid species and the latter eight. Members of the family are termed alvinellids.

The family was first described in 1979 after discoveries made off the Galápagos Islands by the crew of the DSV Alvin. The ship subsequently lent its name to the family and genera within it.

The worms build mucus tubes and extend red feathery gills. Members of the Alvinellidae are noted for their exceptional heat tolerance: one species, Alvinella pompejana, is thought to be the most heat-tolerant complex organism on Earth. Mitochondria start to break down at temperatures of 122–131 °F (50–55 °C), apparently providing an upper limit for eukaryotes. Under laboratory conditions, in a pressurized aquarium with a heat gradient, worms of the species Paralvinella sulfincola, chose water heated to 122 °F (50 °C) and made brief forays into water as hot as 131 °F (55 °C). Unlike other (chemosynthetic) vent-dwelling worms, alvinellid worms possess a digestive tract. However, they do rely on an episymbiotic relationship with thermophilic bacteria; hair-like growths of the bacteria living on the worm's back are thought to offer thermal protection to the worm.

== Family Alvinellidae ==
- Genus Alvinella
  - Species Alvinella caudata
  - Species Alvinella pompejana
- Genus Paralvinella
  - Species Paralvinella bactericola
  - Species Paralvinella fijiensis
  - Species Paralvinella grasslei
  - Species Paralvinella hessleri
  - Species Paralvinella palmiformis
  - Species Paralvinella pandorae
  - Species Paralvinella sulfincola
  - Species Paralvinella unidentata
