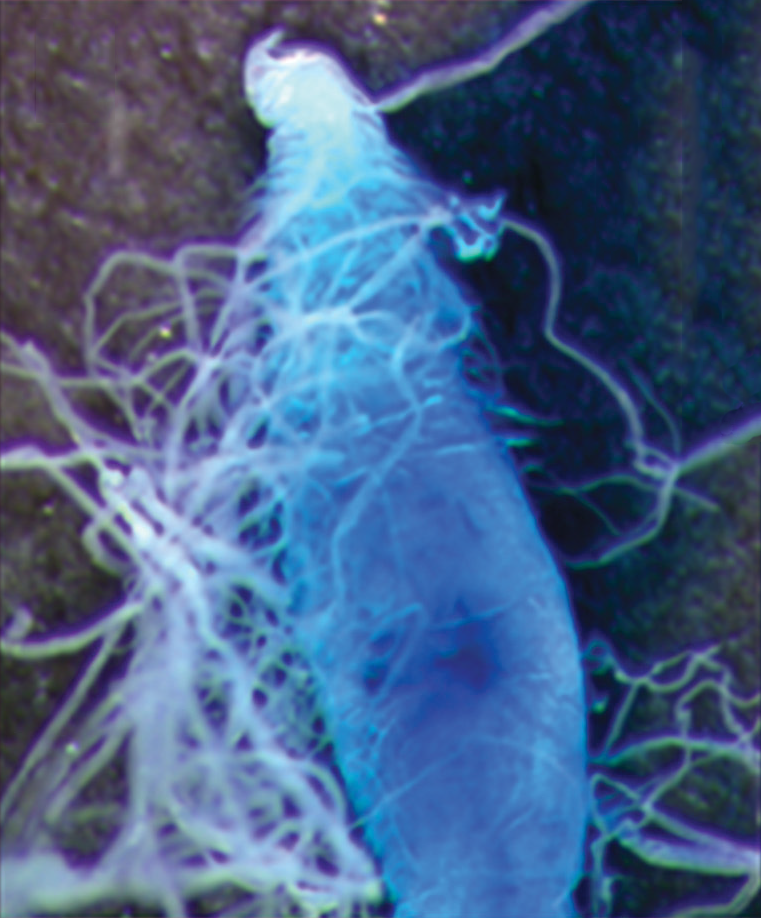

Scientific classification
- Kingdom: Animalia
- Phylum: Annelida
- Clade: Pleistoannelida
- Clade: Sedentaria
- Order: Terebellida
- Family: Cirratulidae
- Genus: Aphelochaeta
- Species: A. praeacuta

Binomial name
- Aphelochaeta praeacuta Dean & Blake, 2016

= Aphelochaeta praeacuta =

Species of annelid worm

Aphelochaeta praeacuta is a species of bitentaculate cirratulidan first found in the Pacific coast of Costa Rica, at a shallow subtidal depth of about 11 to 28 metres (36 to 92 ft) in Bahia Culebra. It is characterised by possessing a first peristomial annulation that extends as a dorsal crest over the second annulation and first setiger.
