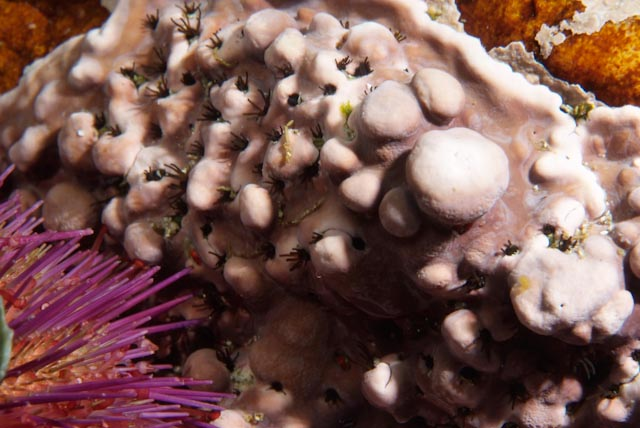

Scientific classification
- Kingdom: Animalia
- Phylum: Annelida
- Clade: Pleistoannelida
- Clade: Sedentaria
- Order: Terebellida
- Family: Cirratulidae
- Genus: Dodecaceria
- Species: D. pulchra

Binomial name
- Dodecaceria pulchra Day, 1955

= Dodecaceria pulchra =

Species of annelid worm

Dodecaceria pulchra, commonly known as the black boring worm, is a species of marine polychaete worm in the family Cirratulidae, native to South Africa.

== Description ==
Black boring worms grow to up to 1 cm in total length. They are small black worms which infest encrusting algae and have protruding gills and palps. They look like black stars studding the algae.

== Distribution ==
These animals are found off the southern African coast from Luderitz in Namibia to Port Elizabeth in South Africa and have been seen from the intertidal and down to 10m underwater.

== Ecology ==
The gills of these animals protrude to absorb oxygen from water, while their palps grasp any available floating food.
