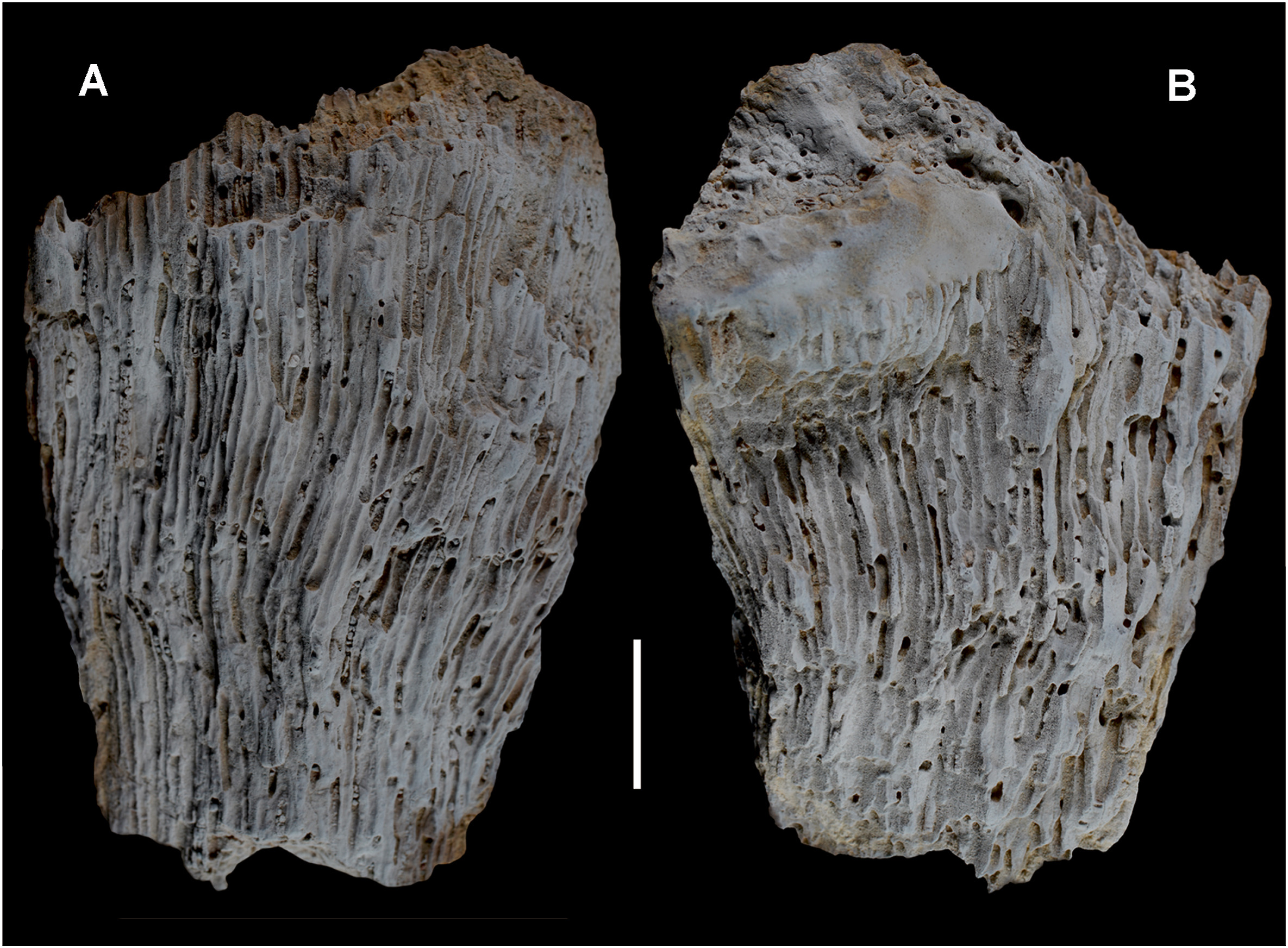
- Diplochaetetes mexicanus

Scientific classification
- Kingdom: Animalia
- Phylum: Annelida
- Clade: Pleistoannelida
- Clade: Sedentaria
- Order: Terebellida
- Family: Cirratulidae
- Genus: †Diplochaetetes; Weissermel, 1913

= Diplochaetetes =

Genus of annelid worms

Diplochaetetes is an extinct genus of marine polychaete worms in the family Cirratulidae. It was initially described as a tabulate coral, and later classified as a sponge. Later studies provided significant evidence that Diplochaetetes fossils are bioconstructions attributable to cirratulid polychaetes due to their strong similarity with modern Dodecaceria aggregates. Both fossil Diplochaetetes and recent Dodecaceria bioconstructions retain identical double-phased biomineralization characteristics, but the possible synonymity of these genera is currently subject to debate.

== Fossil record ==
The first Diplochaetetes fossils were discovered in Namibian sediments dating back to the Eocene. No known Paleocene record has been described, but from the Oligocene onwards, aggregates are found in the pacific coasts of the Americas. It's worth noting that recent bioconstructions are attributed to the genus Dodecaceria.

== Species ==
The following species are currently recognised in the genus Diplochaetetes:

- Diplochaetetes longitubus † Weissermel, 1913
  - Diplochaetetes longitubus vermicularis † Weissermel, 1926
- Diplochaetetes mexicanus † Wilson, 1986
