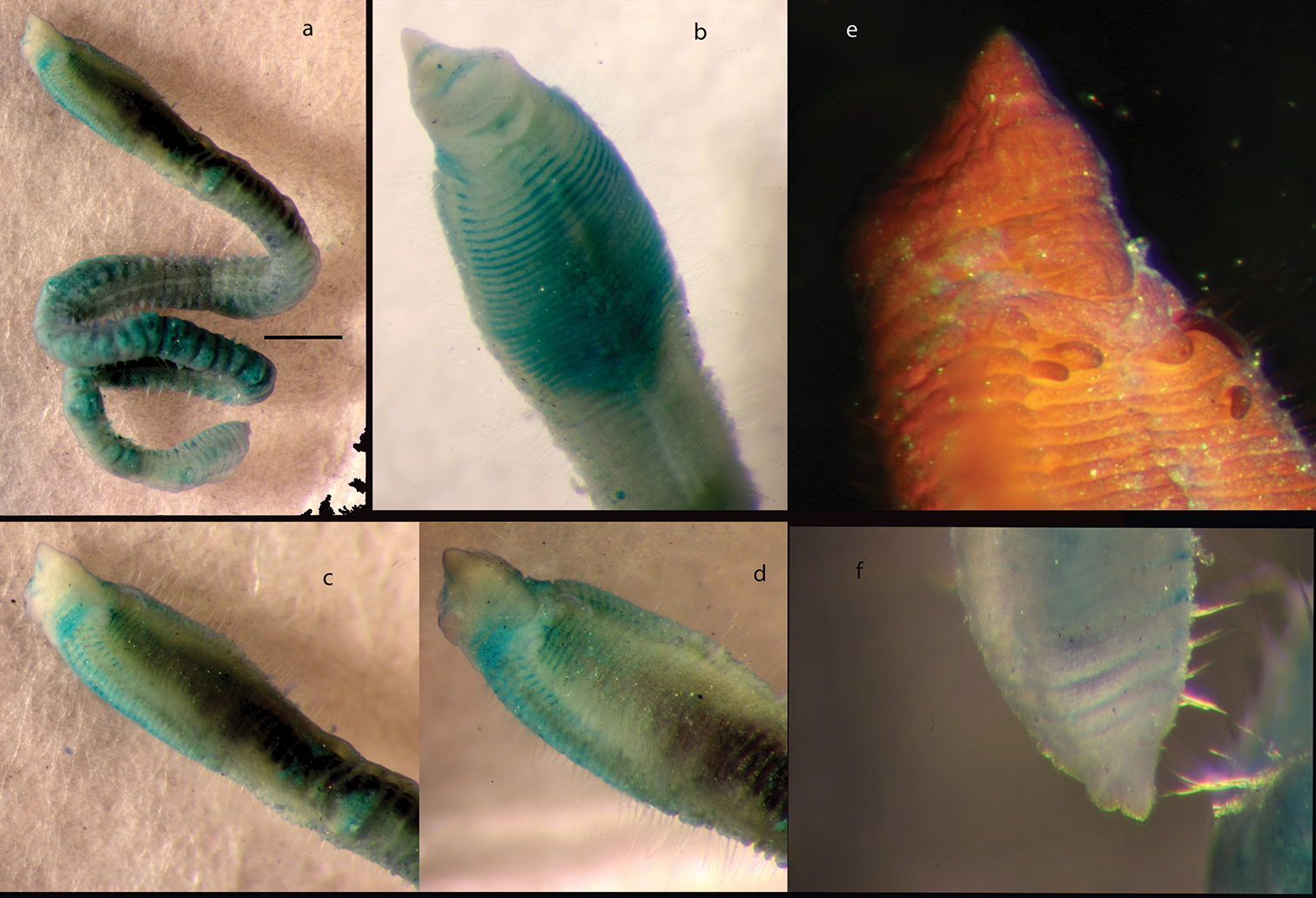
- Aphelochaeta falklandica

Scientific classification
- Kingdom: Animalia
- Phylum: Annelida
- Clade: Pleistoannelida
- Clade: Sedentaria
- Order: Terebellida
- Family: Cirratulidae
- Genus: Aphelochaeta; Blake, 1991

Species
- See text

= Aphelochaeta =

Genus of annelids

Aphelochaeta is a genus of bitentaculate cirratulidan, or two-tentacled marine worms.

== Species ==
- Aphelochaeta antelonga Dean & Blake, 2016
- Aphelochaeta arizonae Magalhaes & Bailey-Brock, 2013
- Aphelochaeta caribbeanensis Blake & Dean, 2019
- Aphelochaeta falklandica Paterson & Neal, 2020
- Aphelochaeta guimondi Dean & Blake, 2016
- Aphelochaeta honouliuli Magalhaes & Bailey-Brock, 2013
- Aphelochaeta praeacuta Dean & Blake, 2016
- Aphelochaeta saipanensis Magalhaes & Bailey-Brock, 2013
- Aphelochaeta striata Dean & Blake, 2016
- Aphelochaeta zebra Dean & Blake, 2016
