= Philip Morris =

Phil(l)ip or Phil Morris may refer to:

== Companies ==
- Altria, a conglomerate company previously known as Philip Morris Companies Inc., named after the tobacconist
  - Philip Morris USA, a tobacco company wholly owned by Altria Group
  - Philip Morris International, a tobacco company that spun off from Altria Group in 2008
  - Philip Morris (cigarette)

== Film and TV ==
- Philip Morris (1893–1949), American actor, known for his role in Home on the Range
- Phil Morris (actor) (born 1959), American actor, best known for his role on Seinfeld
- Philip Morris (archivist) (born 1968), English media recovery expert, known for recovering Doctor Who episodes

== Sportspeople ==
- Philip Morris (English cricketer) (1877–1945), English cricketer
- Philip Morris (New Zealand cricketer) (born 1952), New Zealand cricketer
- Philip Morris (racing driver) (born 1965), American short track racing racer
- Phil Morris (speedway rider) (born 1975), British motorcycle speedway rider and TV game show participant

== Others ==
- Philip Morris (tobacconist) (1835–1873), British tobacconist and importer of cigarettes
- Philip Morris (priest) (born 1950), Archdeacon of Margam
- Philip Richard Morris (1836–1902), English painter
- Phillip Morris, prisoner, and lover of conman and escape artist Steven Jay Russell
- Phillip Morris Napier, American politician in the state of Maine
- Naugle v. Philip Morris, a 2009 court case

== See also ==
- I Love You Phillip Morris, a 2009 film adaptation of a book inspired by the lives of Morris and Russell
