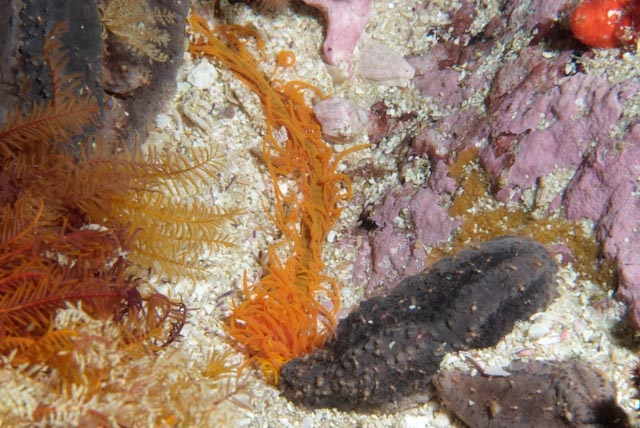
- Cirriformia capensis

Scientific classification
- Kingdom: Animalia
- Phylum: Annelida
- Clade: Pleistoannelida
- Clade: Sedentaria
- Order: Terebellida
- Family: Cirratulidae
- Genus: Cirriformia; Hartman, 1936

= Cirriformia =

Genus of annelid worms

Cirriformia is a genus of marine polychaete worms in the family Cirratulidae.

== Species ==
The following species are classified in this genus:

- Cirriformia afer (Ehlers, 1908)
- Cirriformia capensis (Schmarda, 1861)
- Cirriformia capillaris (Verrill, 1900)
- Cirriformia chefooensis (Grube, 1877)
- Cirriformia chefooensis Grube, 1877
- Cirriformia chrysoderma (Claparède, 1869)
- Cirriformia chrysodermoides Pillai, 1965
- Cirriformia crassicollis (Kinberg, 1866)
- Cirriformia filigera (Delle Chiaje, 1828)
- Cirriformia limnoricola Kirkegaard & Santhakumaran, 1967
- Cirriformia luxuriosa (Moore, 1904)
- Cirriformia maryae Silva, 1961
- Cirriformia melanacantha (Grube, 1872)
- Cirriformia moorei Blake, 1996
- Cirriformia multitentaculata Hartmann-Schröder & Rosenfeldt, 1989
- Cirriformia nasuta (Ehlers, 1897)
- Cirriformia pentatentaculata Hartmann-Schröder & Rosenfeldt, 1989
- Cirriformia punctata (Grube, 1859)
- Cirriformia quetalmahuensis Hartmann-Schröder, 1962
- Cirriformia saxatilis (Gravier, 1906)
- Cirriformia semicincta (Ehlers, 1905)
- Cirriformia spirabrancha (Moore, 1904)
- Cirriformia spirabranchia (Moore, 1904)
- Cirriformia tentaculata (Montagu, 1808)
- Cirriformia tortugaensis (Augener, 1922)
- Cirriformia violacea Westheide, 1981

== Synonyms ==
The following genera are accepted as Cirriformia:

- Audouina [auctt.] (misspelling of Audouinia Quatrefages)
- Audouinia Quatrefages, 1865 (junior homonym)
