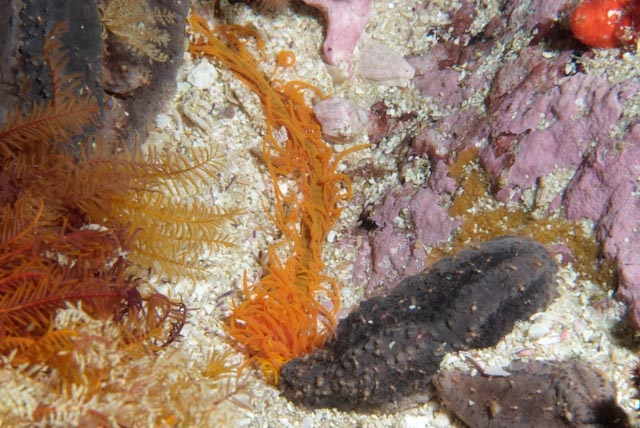

Scientific classification
- Kingdom: Animalia
- Phylum: Annelida
- Clade: Pleistoannelida
- Clade: Sedentaria
- Order: Terebellida
- Family: Cirratulidae
- Genus: Cirriformia
- Species: C. capensis

Binomial name
- Cirriformia capensis (Schmarda, 1861)

= Cirriformia capensis =

Species of annelid worm

Cirriformia capensis, commonly known as the orange thread-gilled worm, is a species of marine polychaete worm in the family Cirratulidae.

== Description ==
Orange thread-gilled worms grow to up to 10 cm in total length. They are soft bodied worms which lie buried in sand or mud or between mussels. Only the long tangled orange gills and soft food gathering tentacles are visible.

== Distribution ==
These animals are found off the southern African coast from Angola to Durban in South Africa and are found subtidally to 20m underwater.

== Synonyms ==
The following species are synonyms of Cirriformia capensis:

- Cirratulus australis Stimpson, 1856 (subjective synonym)
- Cirratulus capensis Schmarda, 1861 (objective synonym)
