= P. fulgida =

P. fulgida may refer to:

- Perna fulgida, a saltwater mussel
- Promenia fulgida, a marine bristle worm
- Psiloptera fulgida, a jewel beetle
- Pyreneola fulgida, a dove snail
