= Cirratulus =

Scientific classification
- Kingdom: Animalia
- Phylum: Annelida
- Clade: Pleistoannelida
- Clade: Sedentaria
- Order: Terebellida
- Family: Cirratulidae
- Genus: Cirratulus; Lamarck, 1818

Genus of segmented worms

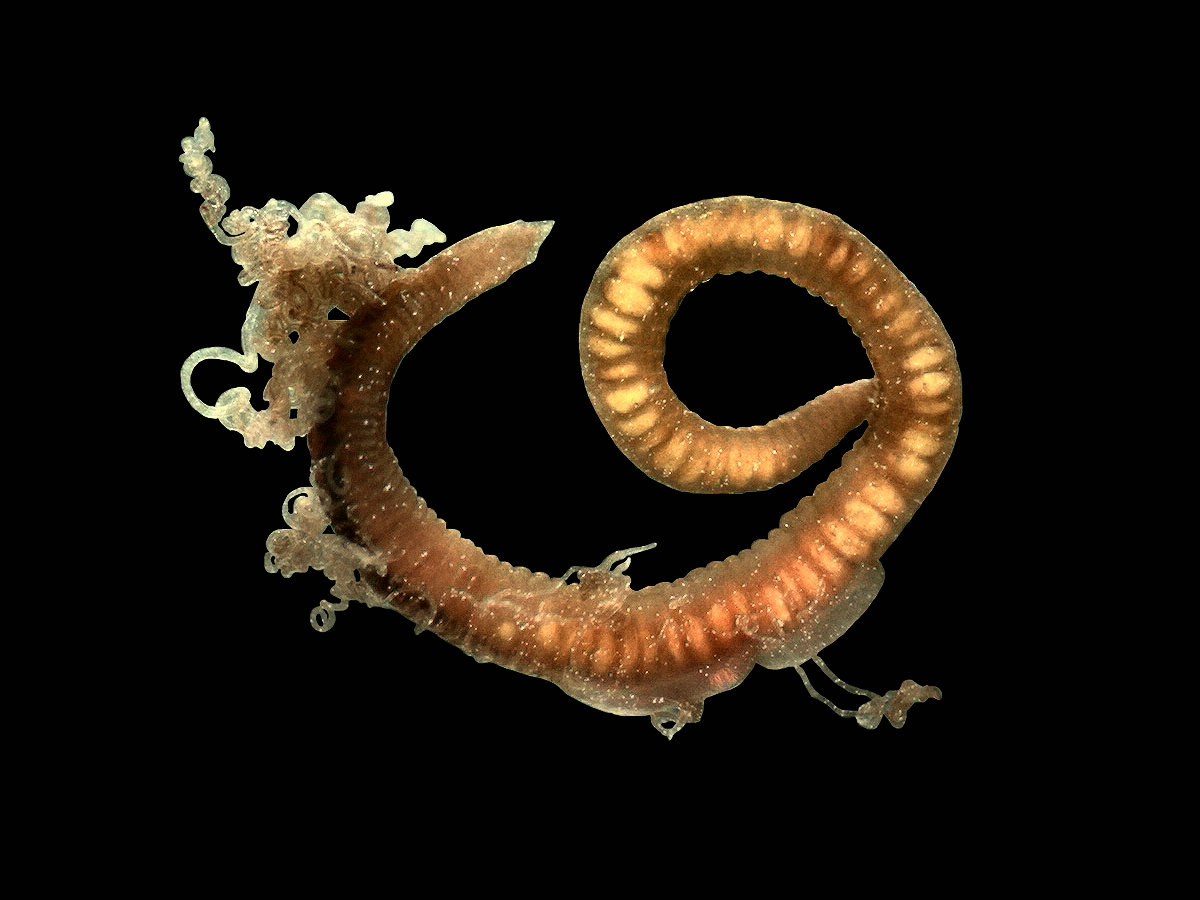
Cirratulus cirratus

Cirratulus is a genus of annelids belonging to the family Cirratulidae.

The genus has cosmopolitan distribution.

Species:

- Cirratulus abranchiatus Hansen, 1878
- Cirratulus abyssorum Hansen, 1878
- Cirratulus africanus Gravier, 1906
- Cirratulus alfonsinae Saracho-Bottero & Elías, 2019
- Cirratulus annamensis Gallardo, 1968
- Cirratulus assimilis McIntosh, 1885
- Cirratulus australis Quatrefages, 1866
- Cirratulus balaenophilus Taboada, Doner, Blake & Avila, 2012
- Cirratulus blainvillei Grube, 1855
- Cirratulus borealis Grube, 1851
- Cirratulus branchioculatus Chlebovitsch, 1959
- Cirratulus caudatus Levinsen, 1893
- Cirratulus cingulatus Johnson, 1901
- Cirratulus cirratus (O.F.Müller, 1776)
- Cirratulus concinnus Ehlers, 1908
- Cirratulus dillonensis Blake, 1996
- Cirratulus elongatus Treadwell, 1901
- Cirratulus exuberans Chamberlin, 1919
- Cirratulus flavescens Grube, 1872
- Cirratulus fuscescens Johnston, 1825
- Cirratulus gilchristi Day, 1961
- Cirratulus glandularis (Langerhans, 1884)
- Cirratulus hedgpethi Hartman, 1951
- Cirratulus incertus McIntosh, 1916
- Cirratulus indicus Day, 1973
- Cirratulus jucundus (Kinberg, 1866)
- Cirratulus knipovichana Saracho-Bottero & Elías, 2019
- Cirratulus longicephalus Imajima, 1964
- Cirratulus longisetis Möbius, 1874
- Cirratulus medusa Johnston, 1833
- Cirratulus megalus Chamberlin, 1919
- Cirratulus mianzanii Saracho Bottero, Elias & Magalhães, 2017
- Cirratulus miniatus Schmarda, 1861
- Cirratulus multioculatus (Hartman, 1961)
- Cirratulus norvegicus
- Cirratulus obscurus Quatrefages, 1866
- Cirratulus orensanzii Saracho-Bottero & Elías, 2019
- Cirratulus pallidus Grube, 1872
- Cirratulus parafiliformis Hartmann-Schröder & Rosenfeldt, 1989
- Cirratulus parvus Moore, 1906
- Cirratulus patagonicus (Kinberg, 1866)
- Cirratulus revillagigedoensis Rioja, 1961
- Cirratulus robustus Johnson, 1901
- Cirratulus serratus Hartmann-Schröder, 1974
- Cirratulus sinincolens Chamberlin, 1919
- Cirratulus spectabilis (Kinberg, 1866)
- Cirratulus tumbesiensis Carrasco, 1977
- Cirratulus wladislavi Buzhinskaja, 1985
- Cirratulus zebuensis McIntosh, 1885
- Cirrhatulus auricapillus Ehrenberg, 1870
