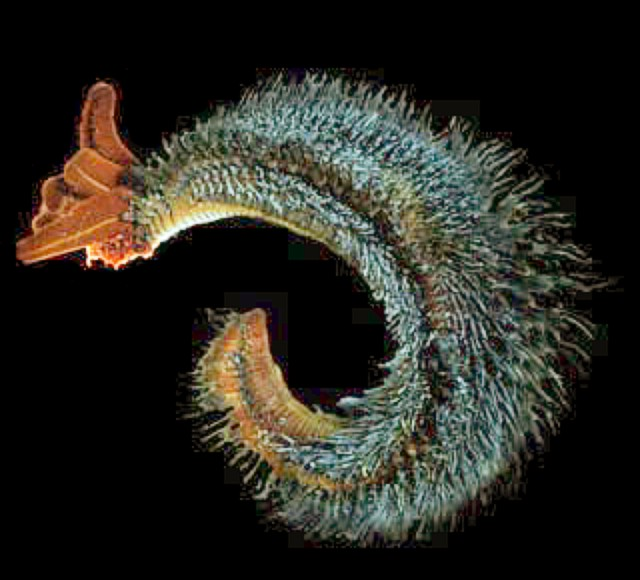

Scientific classification
- Kingdom: Animalia
- Phylum: Annelida
- Clade: Pleistoannelida
- Clade: Sedentaria
- Order: Terebellida
- Family: Alvinellidae
- Genus: Alvinella
- Species: A. pompejana

Binomial name
- Alvinella pompejana Desbruyères and Laubier, 1980

= Alvinella pompejana =

Species of annelid

Alvinella pompejana, the Pompeii worm, is a species of deep-sea polychaete worm (commonly referred to as "bristle worms"). It is an extremophile found only at hydrothermal vents in the Pacific Ocean, discovered in the early 1980s off the Galápagos Islands by French marine biologists.

Alvinella worms live in tubes and cultivate the chemosynthetic bacteria that they feed on. Their symbiotic relationship with epibiotic bacteria allows the worm to withstand extreme temperatures and conditions. The physiology of the worm and the internal chemistry help it to survive in the deep-sea hydrothermal vent environment. The Pompeii worm's physiology, symbiotic relationships, thermal adaptations, life cycle, and unique habitat are all characteristics that lead the worm to be able to survive in such extreme conditions.

== Name ==
The family name Alvinellidae and genus name Alvinella both derive from DSV Alvin, the three-person submersible vehicle used during the discovery of hydrothermal vents and their fauna during the late 1970s. The family Alvinellidae contains over eight other species, but none matches the Pompeii worm's heat tolerance. The genus Alvinella also includes Alvinella caudata, the segmented worm.

Pompeii worms get their specific name pompejana from the Roman city of Pompeii that was destroyed during an eruption of Mount Vesuvius in AD 79.

== Discovery ==
In 1980 Daniel Desbruyères and Lucien Laubier, just a few years after the discovery of the first hydrothermal vent system, identified one of the most heat-tolerant animals on Earth—Alvinella pompejana, the Pompeii worm. It was described as a deep-sea polychaete that resides in tubes near hydrothermal vents, along the seafloor. In 1997, marine biologist Craig Cary and colleagues found the same worms in a new section of Pacific Ocean, near Costa Rica, also attached to hydrothermal vents. The new discovery and subsequent work led to important progress in the scientific knowledge of these special worms.

== Description ==
=== Physiology ===
Pompeii worms are usually around 10 centimetres (3.9 in) in length, but can reach up to 13 cm (5.1 in). They have a diameter of less than 1 cm (0.39 in). They are pale gray, with red tentacle-like gills on their heads. Perhaps most fascinating, their tail ends are often resting in temperatures as high as 50 °C (122 °F), while their feather-like heads stick out of the tubes into water that is much cooler, 22 °C (72 °F). The gills of A. pompejana are pinnate with many thin outgrowths. This organ is ultrastructurally similar to the gills of Terebellidae and the epidermis is irregularly folded inwards. This gives the blood access to a space very close to the skin of A. pompejana, thus allowing more effective oxygen diffusion. Secretory cells of the goblet type have also been observed, along with hairlike receptor cells known as bipolar ciliary receptor cells. The Pompeii worm's epibiotic bacteria are absent from both the gills and tentacles.

Alvinella pompejana has relatively simple organ systems centering around its rod-like heart. Its outermost organ is the gills along its feather-shaped head, four external gills present as leaf-like structures with a red color due to their hemoglobin. The heart provides blood to these organs using contractions, pushing blood along the dorsal and ventral vessels. Beneath the heart lies the animal's stomach which connects to an oesophagus that is used to consume food. Finally, surrounding the organs is a coelom filled with coelomocytes, a type of phagocyte that acts as an immune system for the animal.

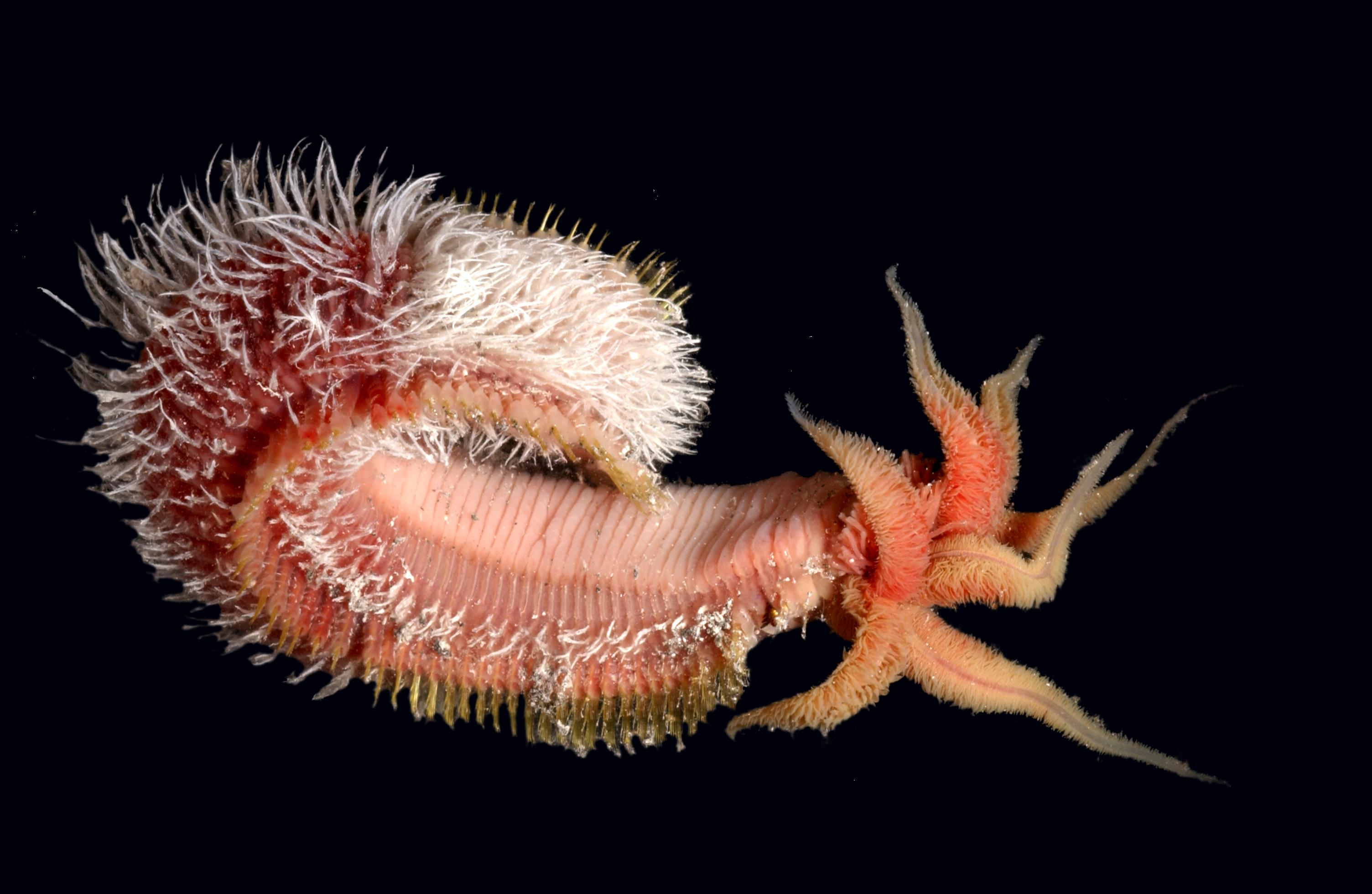
The white filaments on the worm's body are symbiotic bacteria

Alvinella pompejana's blood is abnormally cool at 20–30 °C (68–86 °F). This is due to their blood's high positive cooperativity at these temperatures, thus haemoglobin is more likely to gain oxygen, an essential feature in an environment with sparse oxygen levels. Additionally, A. pompejana's gills have the highest specific surface area of any polychaete and small diffusion distances between the circulatory system and external seawater further assist in oxygenation.

Studies are hampered by the difficulties of sampling; It is currently quite difficult for Pompeii worms to survive decompression.

==== Internal chemistry ====
Alvinellidae have an exceptionally high congenital oxygen affinity, in addition to a high heat requirement for oxygenation (𝚫H). Therefore, to allow adequate release of oxygen within the body, the Pompeii worm has acidic blood with a pH range of 6.6–6.9. A lower pH decreases the energy required to unbind oxygen from hemoglobin by utilizing the Bohr effect. The effect gradually compounds as the hemoglobin's 4 O_{2} binding sites are emptied, and it is reaches its maximum when the hemoglobin is fully deoxygenated. As a result, they can release all possible oxygen without expending excessive energy. To further compound this effect, A. pompejana's vascular hemoglobin has a lower oxygen affinity when compared to coelomic hemoglobin. When it is time to rebind oxygen to the hemoglobin, the blood must be cooled to 20–30 °C (68–86 °F) to regain optimal cooperativity. However, hydrothermal vents reach much higher temperatures. This makes the low blood temperature strange and seemingly hard to maintain.

The current hypothesis is that the polychaete worm maintains an "external microenvironment" that does not exceed this 20–30 °C (68–86 °F) limit, possibly through cold water being pulled into the tube during the worms repeated exit and entry in addition to the bacteria circulating this water around the worms body. This is supported by evidence that A. pompejana's mitochondria break down when 30 °C (86 °F) is exceeded. Despite this, the worm still manages to live in vents that exceed 50 °C (122 °F). Furthermore, an inverse relationship is drawn between 𝚫H value and the temperature range of an environment; a higher 𝚫H means a habitat has a smaller range of temperatures with fewer fluctuations. As A. pompejana has a high 𝚫H, it is reasonable to theorize that their habitable temperature range is quite small with few fluctuations.

==== Symbionts ====
Pompeii worms have "hairy" backs; these "hairs" are actually colonies of bacteria such as Nautilia profundicola, which form a "fleece-like" covering on their backs that may be up to 1 cm (0.39 in) thick; these layers are thought to afford the worm some degree of thermal insulation. The bacteria may possess special proteins, "eurythermal enzymes", providing the bacteria—and by extension the worms—protection from a wide range of temperatures.

Glands on the worm's back secrete a mucus on which the bacteria feed, a form of symbiosis. The bacteria have also been discovered to be chemolithotrophic, contributing to the ecology of the vent community. Recent research suggests the bacteria might play an important role in the feeding of the worms.

The bacteria are known to live in a mutualistic relationship with A. pompejana, making them both symbiotrophs. The main nutrition for the Pompeii worm is derived from chemosynthetic bacteria, this is why it chooses to live in such intense environments. This is due to the toxic metal levels of hydrothermal vent fluid, a factor chemosynthetic bacteria require. Unfortunately, the low pH, low oxygen levels and aforementioned metals within the fluid create an environment only fit for extremophiles; A. pompejana has physiological traits to assist in combating this but they are not enough. As a result, they have developed a strong relationship with the bacteria. The bacteria detoxify the fluid; this allows the worm to feed and live. Then, as the worm lives it respires, thus giving the bacteria a carbon source to feed upon. As an additional benefit, the bacteria gain shelter and surfaces to multiply upon due to the worm's tubes.

Study of the Pompeii worm's seemingly life-sustaining bacteria could lead to significant advances in the biochemical, pharmaceutical, textile, paper, and detergent industries.

=== Habitat ===
Pompeii worms are endemic of the East Pacific Rise, specifically within the latitudinal range 21°N to 32°S and at a depth of around 2,500 metres (8,200 ft). They exclusively live on the surface of high-temperature, active hydrothermal vents. The worms and their symbionts rely on the sulfide produced by the vents.

Living among Pompeii worms at the vents are several other polychaete species. They are found living near other alvinellids, polynoids, nereidids, and hesionids. Other taxa frequently found near them are amphipods and brachyuran crabs.

=== Thermal tolerance ===
The Pompeii worm is one of the most thermal tolerant animals on Earth. The Pompeii worm lives in water that can change massively in temperature over just a few centimeters. Temperatures near the worms have been found to be between 50 and 2 °C (122 and 36 °F), which is a stark difference. Temperatures between 50 and 55 °C (122 and 131 °F) for more than 2 hours was fatal for the Pompeii worms. The ideal temperature for the worms is between 20 and 42 °C (68 and 108 °F). Previous literature claimed that A. pompejana could thrive in temperatures up to 80 °C (176 °F). However, it was found that A. pompejana proteins started to denature at above 50 °C (122 °F). This drastic change in literature is likely due to the fact that researchers previously punctured the worms to get a temperature reading inside, causing a change in the flow of water throughout the body of the worm and giving inaccurate results.

The extreme thermal limit of A. pompejana is due to its internal chemistry. The proteins inside the Pompeii worm contain many small charged amino acids, which are hydrophobic. This helps the worm to regulate its temperature. A. pompejana also contains a large amount of collagen in its tissues. Collagen is the most heat resistant fiber and therefore allows the Pompeii worm to survive in these temperatures. It was found that the collagen in the Pompeii worm has high Proline concentration. Gly-X-Y triplets of the proline lead to a triple helical structure which greatly helped with stability. Proteins were less likely to be denatured at high temperatures due to this stability. The worm also uses tubes that surround it as a barrier to the hot water. Additionally, epibiotic bacteria coat the back of the worm and help protect from extreme temperatures.

=== Tubes ===
The Pompeii worm is known for the tubes that it inhabits. Further research has uncovered that these tubes are unusually stable glycoprotein structures with high sulfur levels. Their construction was originally unknown but it is now hypothesized that the structure is made from a secretion from the epidermis of Alvinella pompejana. The fibril layers of the tubing are layered in a similar manner to plywood with each layer being slightly random. Within these tubes a layer of filamentous and rod-shaped bacteria are present, strangely these same bacteria can be found embedded within the walls of the tubes. It has been assumed that these are the bacteria that live in the worm's tubing, they seem to become trapped when the mucus is secreted. Additionally, bacteria have been found to be a source of elemental sulfur which explains the sulfur detected within their tube walls.

== Biology ==
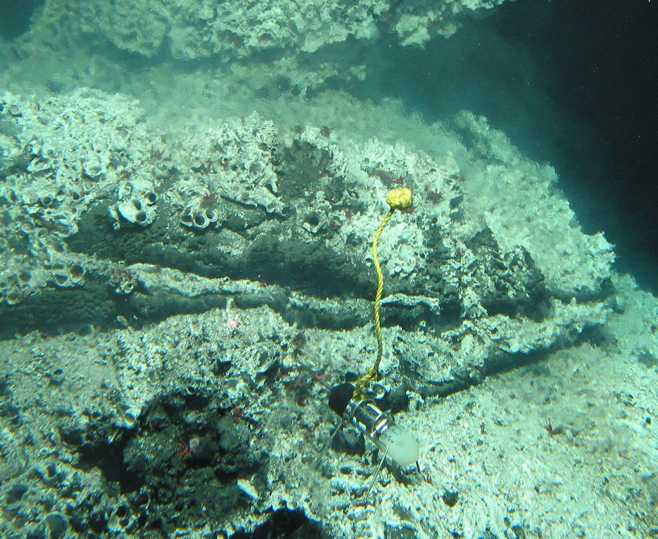
Research apparatus anchored on a colony of Pompeii worms

Pompeii worms form large, aggregate colonies enclosed in long tubes. Attaching themselves to black smokers, the worms have been found to thrive at sustained temperatures of from 45 to 60 °C (113 to 140 °F) and even 105 °C (221 °F) for a short time, making the Pompeii worm the most heat-tolerant complex animal known to science after tardigrades (or water bears), which are able to survive temperatures over 150 °C (302 °F). Pompeii worms simultaneously keep their heads (including the gills) in much cooler water while their tails are exposed to hot water. Since their internal temperature has yet to be measured, a Pompeii worm may survive exposure to hot water by dissipating heat through its head to keep its internal temperature within the realm previously known to be compatible with animal survival.

The Pompeii worm feeds upon their chemosynthetic bacteria, using retractable, ciliated feeding tentacles to scoop them up or absorbing their organic matter within the hydrothermal vent fluid. These tentacles are coated with 4 types of secretory cells along the entire epidermis. The tentacle's muscle cells seem to be filled with homogenous blood cells and individual hat-shaped cells, the hat-shaped cells have a condensed nucleus and it is hypothesized that these are heavily modified sperm cells.

=== Life cycle ===
Alvinella pompejana are a gonochoric species with distinct differences between the male and female genital pores (located at the base of the gills). Males have a pair of tentacles near the mouth that are absent in females. However, females possess a genital tract consisting of oviducts and spermathecae. The exact method of reproduction is unknown but it is believed that it is a complex multi-step process. However, it is known that the Pompeii worm's habitat rapidly changes and is extremely unstable, and thus their reproduction has adapted accordingly.

The size of the female oocytes suggests that the embryo is lecithotrophic meaning the only nutrition is within the yolk of the egg. Prior to fertilisation these oocytes are flattened spheres with an undulating membrane and a slightly off centre germinal vesicle that is less dense than the surrounding cytoplasm. Upon dilution in seawater, they become spherical and the GV disappears, at this point the whole oocyte appears homogeneous. This process does not require sperm.

The current hypothesis for egg synthesis and spawning is as follows: first the yolk is formed through a long process within the animal's coelom, next, the mature eggs are stored and finally, the eggs are spawned when either an environmental or biological change occurs (eg. sperm transfer). The method for transfer of spermatozoa it is likely achieved through pseudo-copulatory behavior as the worms have been observed diving head-first into tubes in a display that may be mating.

When it is deemed appropriate to fertilize the eggs they are seemingly selected based upon size and then individually passed through the spermathecae. This method of fertilization is more efficient than having all eggs be passed through at once.

Between 30 minutes and several hours after fertilization has been achieved, the fertilization envelope progressively elevates. This begins at a single point along the periphery of the oocyte. Then, prior to the first cleavage, a polar lobe forms thus resulting in asymmetrical cleavages. The diameter ratio between the asymmetrical blastomeres remains fairly constant (1:1.5) with "4 cell" embryos typically possessing 1 cell bigger than the other 3. This is a similar to the pattern observed in other polychaetes.

==== Early development ====
Although in situ observations are yet to be made of Alvinella pompejana's early development, experiments have been conducted in order to hypothesize the embryonic and early stages of this polychaete's life.

Embryos of the Pompeii worm are unable to tolerate both low and high temperatures, only developing in temperatures higher than 2 °C (36 °F) and lower than 20 °C (68 °F). At 2 °C (36 °F), the temperature of the abyssal sea, embryos enter a state of arrested development and, at 20 °C (68 °F), the embryos die. Therefore, they cannot develop in hydrothermal vent colonies as temperatures by these vents are typically much higher than 20 °C (68 °F).

Both in vitro and in situ incubation supported the hypothesis that embryonic development within an adult colony is impossible. To test their theory, researchers placed embryos in 3 areas, (I1) at the base of the chimney, (I2) in a Riftia pachyptila colony and (I3) in an adult colony. Results are presented in the below table with the highest survival and development rate coming from the (I1) and (I2) placements. Although the max temperature directly next to the (I3) incubator was 17 °C (63 °F), temperatures as high as 27 °C (81 °F) were recorded 20 cm (7.9 in) away.

	Survival (%)	Embryos with cleavage after 5 days (%)	Mean temp (°C)	Max temp (°C)	Min pH	Mean pH
I1	≤100%	70%	4±2 °C	9 °C	7.3	7.7
I2	≤100%	70%	6±2 °C	11 °C	7.3	7.5
I3	10%	0%	13±4 °C	17 °C	7.1	7.2

After considering all results, as well as prior studies, it was concluded that the 3 most likely hypotheses are as follows.

1. Embryos develop within a Riftia pachyptila colony (often near hydrothermal vents)
2. Embryos develop at the base of hydrothermal chimneys
3. Embryos enter a state of arrest and float in the abyssal column until a warm environment is found before resuming development (this would allow the dispersal of the species)

However, new evidence of an ecosystem underneath hydrothermal vents has suggested that the worm larvae may instead travel underground to colonize new vent systems.
