= Ctenodrilidae =

Scientific classification
- Domain: Eukaryota
- Kingdom: Animalia
- Phylum: Annelida
- Clade: Pleistoannelida
- Clade: Sedentaria
- Order: Terebellida
- Family: Ctenodrilidae

Family of annelids

Ctenodrilidae is a family of polychaetes belonging to the order Terebellida.

Genera:

- Zeppelina Vaillant, 1890
