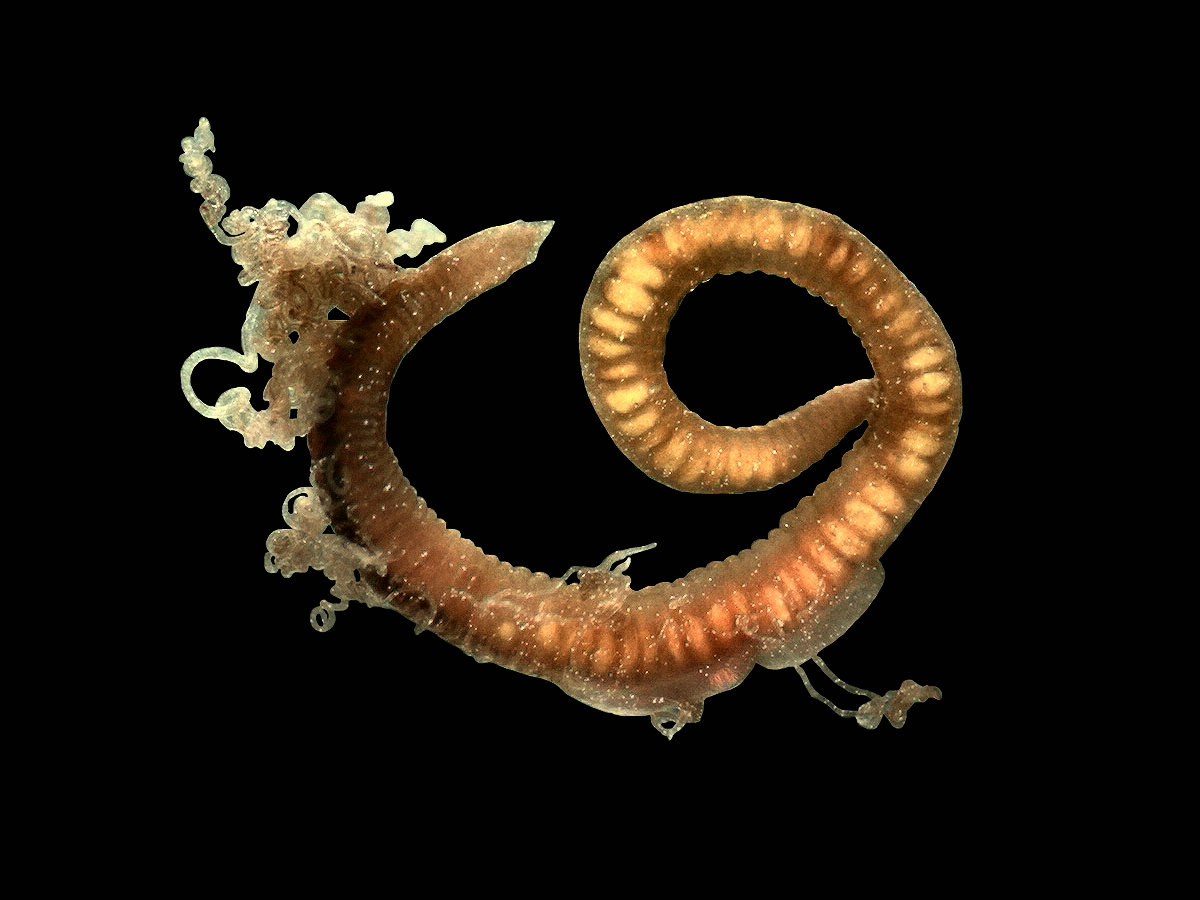

Scientific classification
- Kingdom: Animalia
- Phylum: Annelida
- Clade: Pleistoannelida
- Clade: Sedentaria
- Order: Terebellida
- Family: Cirratulidae
- Genus: Cirratulus
- Species: C. cirratus

Binomial name
- Cirratulus cirratus (O. F. Müller, 1776)

Synonyms
- Lumbricus cirratus Müller, 1776; Promenia fulgida Ehlers, 1897

= Cirratulus cirratus =

Species of annelid worm

Cirratulus cirratus is a species of marine polychaete worm in the family Cirratulidae. It occurs in the littoral and sub-littoral zones of the Atlantic Ocean.

Polychaetes, or marine bristle worms, have elongated bodies divided into many segments. Each segment may bear setae (bristles) and parapodia (paddle-like appendages). Some species live freely, either swimming, crawling or burrowing, and these are known as "errant". Others live permanently in tubes, either calcareous or parchment-like, and these are known as "sedentary".

== Description ==
Cirratulus cirratus grows to up to thirty centimetres long with up to 150 segments. It has a slender, orange, pinkish or brownish body. The prostomium or head is a blunt cone with a row of 4 to 8 large black eyes on either side. The first segment bears two groups of up to eight feeding tentacles. At intervals along the body there are pairs of long slender gills which look like a mass of reddish threads. Short, blunt bristles are found on segments 10 to 12 and more on segments 20 to 23.

== Distribution and habitat ==
Cirratulus cirratus is found along the coasts of north west Europe and also in the south Atlantic Ocean. It mostly occurs living in burrows on the lower shore in mud or muddy sand, often underneath or between rocks.

== Biology ==
Cirratulus cirratus is a filter feeder, catching particles floating past with its tentacles and conveying them to its mouth.

The sexes are separate and the worms become sexually active spasmodically at intervals of one to two years. The males are white at this time and the females yellowish due to the oocytes in their coelom. Once the oocytes have been fertilised, they are stuck to rocks in a jelly-like mass. They hatch after six days into ciliated post-trochophore larvae. These live off the yolk sac for about twenty-four days before settling and starting filter feeding. Asexual reproduction by means of clones growing from the posterior of the worm have been recorded, but the taxonomic status of Cirratulus is under constant review and this report may refer to a different species.
