= Lawrence Eckhoff =

New Zealand cricketer

Larry Eckhoff
Personal information
- Full name: Lawrence Raymond James Eckhoff
- Born: 19 May 1952 (age 74); Dunedin, Otago, New Zealand
- Batting: Right-handed
- Bowling: Right-arm fast-medium

Domestic team information
- Years: Team
- 1975/76: Otago
- Source: CricketArchive, 27 February 2024

Lawrence Raymond James Eckhoff (born 19 May 1952) is a former New Zealand cricketer. He was born at Dunedin in Otago in 1952 and educated at Otago Boys' High School where he played cricket.

An "energetic" right-arm fast-medium bowler who was described by The Press as "an interesting recruit" ahead of his senior debut in November 1975, Eckhoff played one first-class and one List A cricket match for Otago during the 1975–76 season. On debut, in a List A match against Canterbury, he took the only two Canterbury wickets to fall, those of Barry Hadlee and Peter Coman, his "explosive action" generating out-swing which caused the opposing batsmen difficulties, although he was "plagued by no balls, and sometimes erred in length and line".

Writing in The Press after the match Dick Brittenden considered that "more, surely, will be heard of him", but in the event Eckhoff only played in one more representative match for Otago. After taking a single wicket opening the bowling against Canterbury in mid-December in his first-class debut, he was injured and unable to play in the following match against Wellington, his place taken by Philip Morris, and Eckhoff did not regain his place in the team. He had previously played age-group and Second XI cricket for the team during the 1972–73 season.

In ten years of A grade cricket in Dunedin, he took 427 wickets at a bowling average of 17.20 runs per wicket. He moved to Australia after accepting an offer from the Sturt Cricket Club in Adelaide and was a member of the Sturt team that won the premiership in 1979. He left Sturt in 1981 to take up a playing coach position at Port Adelaide Cricket Club but returned to Sturt in 1985.
