= Ethyl Green =

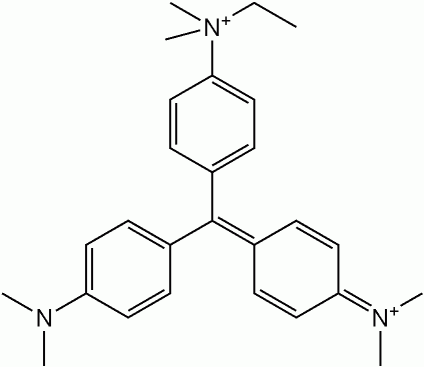

Identifiers
CAS Number	14855-76-6
3D model (JSmol)	Interactive image
ChemSpider	76382
ECHA InfoCard	100.027.651
PubChem CID	84672
UNII	QFQ95SNB21
CompTox Dashboard (EPA)	DTXSID60991440
- InChI: InChI=1S/C27H35N3/c1-8-30(6,7)26-19-13-23(14-20-26)27(21-9-15-24(16-10-21)28(2)3)22-11-17-25(18-12-22)29(4)5/h9-20H,8H2,1-7H3/q+2 Key: ZRJYQNPSWSGCMS-UHFFFAOYSA-N
- SMILES: CC[N+](C)(C)C1=CC=C(C=C1)C(=C2C=CC(=[N+](C)C)C=C2)C3=CC=C(C=C3)N(C)C

Properties
Chemical formula	C_{27}H_{35}N^{2+}_{3}
Melting point	decomposes
- Except where otherwise noted, data are given for materials in their standard state (at 25 °C [77 °F], 100 kPa). verify (what is ?) Infobox references

Ethyl Green (C.I. 42590; C_{27}H_{35}BrClN_{3}) is a water-soluble triarylmethane dye.

It is derived from crystal violet by adding a N-ethyl group; crystal violet is therefore a possible contaminant. Changing the N-ethyl group to N-methyl yields methyl green. All three dyes are used as histological stains.
