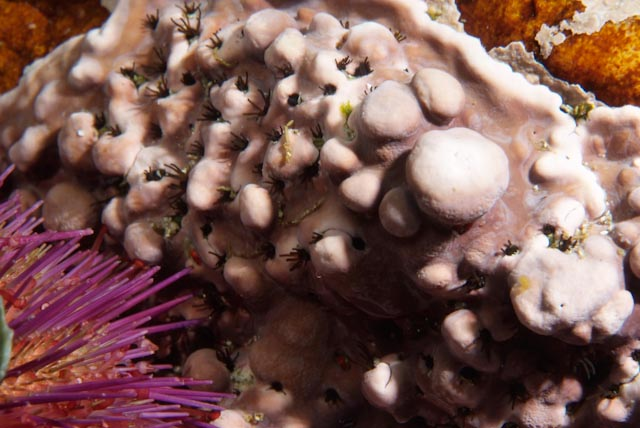
- Dodecaceria pulchra

Scientific classification
- Kingdom: Animalia
- Phylum: Annelida
- Clade: Pleistoannelida
- Clade: Sedentaria
- Order: Terebellida
- Family: Cirratulidae
- Genus: Dodecaceria; Örsted, 1843

Synonyms
- Heterocirrus Grube, 1855; Naraganseta Leidy, 1855

= Dodecaceria =

Genus of annelid worms

Dodecaceria is a genus of marine polychaete worms in the family Cirratulidae. It's also one of the very few polychaete genera with a verified fossil record.

The genus contains bioluminescent species.

== Fossil record ==
The earliest species on record, Dodecaceria cretacea (Voigt, 1971), later reclassified as the ichnofossil Caulostrepsis cretacea, was responsible for leaving boring traces on Late Cretaceous coral reefs. Authors such as Fischer et al. (1989, 2000) have proposed that Diplochaetetes fossil bioconstructions may be attributed to Dodecaceria due to synonymity. A research by Guido et al. (2024) reported very similar double-phased biomineralization processes in bioconstructions attributed to these genera.

== Species ==
The following species are recognised in the genus Dodecaceria:

- Dodecaceria alphahelixae Blake & Dean, 2019
- Dodecaceria ater (Quatrefages, 1866)
- Dodecaceria berkeleyi Knox, 1972
- Dodecaceria capensis Day, 1961
- Dodecaceria carolinae Aguilar-Camacho & Salazar-Vallejo, 2011
- Dodecaceria choromytilicola Carrasco, 1977
- Dodecaceria concharum Örsted, 1843
- Dodecaceria coralii (Leidy, 1855)
- Dodecaceria cretacea † (currently accepted name: Caulostrepsis cretacea) (Voigt, 1971)
- Dodecaceria dibranchiata Blake & Dean, 2019
- Dodecaceria diceria Hartman, 1951
- Dodecaceria fistulicola Ehlers, 1901
- Dodecaceria gallardoi Carrasco, 1977
- Dodecaceria inhamata (Hoagland, 1919)
- Dodecaceria joubini Gravier, 1905
- Dodecaceria laddi Hartman, 1954
- Dodecaceria meridiana Elias & Rivero, 2009
- Dodecaceria multifiligera Hartmann-Schröder, 1962
- Dodecaceria opulens Gravier, 1908
- Dodecaceria pacifica (Fewkes, 1889)
- Dodecaceria pulchra Day, 1955
- Dodecaceria saeria Paterson & Neal, 2020
- Dodecaceria saxicola (Grube, 1855)
- Dodecaceria sextentaculata (Delle Chiaje, 1822-1826)
