= Naugle v. Philip Morris USA, Inc. =

2009 Florida circuit court case

Naugle v. Philip Morris
- Court: Broward County Circuit Court, Florida
- Decided: 19/11/2009

Case history
- Appealed to: 4th District Court of Appeal in West Palm Beach

Court membership
- Judge sitting: Judge Jeffrey Streitfeld

Naugle v. Philip Morris was a landmark 2009 court case in which a jury awarded the plaintiff Lucinda Naugle $300 million. The award included $56.6 million in compensatory damages for medical expenses and $244 million in punitive damages. At the time, the verdict was the largest award given to an individual suing a tobacco company, and was featured on NBC, ABC, 60 Minutes, and The New York Times. In 2012, the verdict amount for punitive damages was reduced to $36.8 million.

== Background ==
In 1968, Lucinda Naugle, an office manager from Fort Lauderdale, Florida and sister of former Ft. Lauderdale mayor Jim Naugle, began smoking at the age of 20. She quit when she was 45. As a result of smoking, Naugle suffered from severe emphysema.

At trial, Naugle claimed Philip Morris directly concealed the fact that cigarettes were harmful to health and addictive. Philip Morris was also sued on the basis that the cigarettes manufactured and sold by the company were unreasonably dangerous. The case was an Engle-progeny case, resulting from the Engle v. Liggett Group class action suit in 2006, where the Florida Supreme Court upheld a jury’s finding that cigarettes were dangerous to health and addictive.

Naugle v. Phillip Morris was tried in Broward County Circuit Court, Ft. Lauderdale, FL, and a verdict was returned by the jury on November 20, 2009. The plaintiff was represented by Robert W. Kelley of Kelley/Uustal PLC.

== Appeal ==
In 2010, a final judgment by Circuit Court Judge Jeffrey Streitfeld reduced the punitive damages to $36.8 million in a post-verdict motion. Philip Morris USA later appealed this award, stating that the punitive damages were still excessive. The appeal was considered at the 4th District Court of Appeal in West Palm Beach, which upheld Philip Morris USA’s liability in the case, but decided that a new jury would consider the final amount to be awarded to the plaintiff.
