= Philip Morris (New Zealand cricketer) =

New Zealand cricketer (born 1952)

Personal information
- Full name: Philip Robert Morris
- Born: 15 May 1952 (age 74); Dunedin, Otago, New Zealand
- Batting: Left-handed
- Bowling: Right-arm medium

Domestic team information
- Years: Team
- 1975/76–1976/77: Otago
- Source: ESPNcricinfo, 18 May 2016

Philip Robert Morris (born 15 May 1952) is a New Zealand former cricketer. He played 11 first-class matches for Otago during the 1975–76 and 1976–77 seasons.

Morris was born at Dunedin in 1952 and educated at King's High School in the city. He played for an Otago under-23 team during the 1974–75 season before making his senior representative debut for the team the following season, taking two wickets on debut against Wellington at the Basin Reserve in December 1975 after breaking in to the team following an injury to Larry Eckhoff.

Going on to play four more matches for Otago during the season and six during the following season, as well as playing a single List A match for the team, Morris took a total of 16 first-class wickets. He played club cricket for Albion Cricket Club in Dunedin and coached at the club, including helping to coach future New Zealand players Brendon and Nathan McCullum.
