= Methyl green =

Chemical compound

Identifiers
- IUPAC name: [4-([4-(Dimethylamino)phenyl]{4-[ethyl(dimethyl)ammonio]phenyl}methylene)-2,5-cyclohexadien-1-ylidene](dimethyl)ammonium bromide chloride dichlorozinc (1:1:1:1)
- CAS Number: 82-94-0 36148-59-1 (zinc chloride salt)
- PubChem CID: 6727
- UNII: 6P7U4T9BXA
- CompTox Dashboard (EPA): DTXSID00914092 DTXSID60889419, DTXSID00914092
- ECHA InfoCard: 100.001.316

Chemical and physical data
- Formula: C_{26}H_{33}Cl_{2}N_{3}
- Molar mass: 458.47 g·mol^{−1}

Methyl green (CI 42585) is a cationic or positive charged stain related to Ethyl Green that has been used for staining DNA since the 19th century. It has been used for staining cell nuclei either as a part of the classical Unna-Pappenheim stain or as a nuclear counterstain ever since.
In recent years, its fluorescent properties, when bound to DNA, have positioned it as useful for far-red imaging of live cell nuclei. Fluorescent DNA staining is routinely used in cancer prognosis. Methyl green also emerges as an alternative stain for DNA in agarose gels, fluorometric assays, and flow cytometry. It has also been shown that it can be used as an exclusion viability stain for cells. Its interaction with DNA has been shown to be non-intercalating, in other words, not inserting itself into the DNA, but instead electrostatic with the DNA major groove. It is used in combination with pyronin in the methyl green–pyronin stain, which stains and differentiates DNA and RNA.

When excited at 244 or 388 nm in a neutral aqueous solution, methyl green produces a fluorescent emission at 488 or 633 nm, respectively. The presence or absence of DNA does not affect these fluorescence behaviors. When binding DNA under neutral aqueous conditions, methyl green also becomes fluorescent in the far red with an excitation maximum of 633 nm and an emission maximum of 677 nm.

Commercial Methyl green preparations are often contaminated with Crystal violet. Crystal violet can be removed by chloroform extraction.
