= Daniel Desbruyères =

French oceanographer and deep-sea researcher

- Born: 29 May 1945 (age 81); Paris (3rd), France
- Education: Pierre and Marie Curie University
- Known for: Research on deep-sea hydrothermal vents and their associated organisms
- Awards: Philip Morris Scientific Prize (1993)
- Scientific career
- Fields: Oceanography; Deep-sea ecosystems
- Workplaces: French Research Institute for Exploitation of the Sea (IFREMER)

Daniel Desbruyères (born 29 May 1945) is a French marine biologist and oceanographer specialising in deep-sea ecosystems, particularly hydrothermal vent ecology and the taxonomy of marine annelids. He worked as a senior researcher at the French Research Institute for Exploitation of the Sea (IFREMER), where he was responsible for directing research programmes on deep-sea hydrothermal ecosystems.

== Scientific career ==
Desbruyères began his scientific career in 1970, studying the continental shelf off Catalonia, Spain. He subsequently spent six years investigating marine fauna around the Kerguelen Islands in the southern Indian Ocean. In 1976, he joined the deep-sea biology team at the Centre national pour l'exploitation des océans (CNEXO), one of the predecessor organisations of IFREMER. Between 1977 and 1985, he led numerous oceanographic expeditions devoted to studying the abyssal basin of the Bay of Biscay. During this period, he developed an experimental method for investigating the effects of disturbances in deep-sea environments.

From 1982 onwards, Desbruyères led numerous research expeditions using IFREMER's crewed submersibles, including Cyana and Nautile, to investigate deep-sea hydrothermal vents in the eastern and western Pacific and the Atlantic Ocean southwest of the Azores. He participated in 37 dives in research submersibles at depths exceeding 1,000 metres.

His taxonomic research resulted in the description of numerous hydrothermal vent invertebrates, particularly polychaete annelids. His contributions included one new family, seven new genera, 25 new species and one new subspecies. He also conducted ecological studies of hydrothermal vent communities and investigated the biology of the Pompeii worm (Alvinella pompejana), a species inhabiting the walls of hydrothermal vent chimneys.

Between 1995 and 1998, Desbruyères directed the European AMORES research programme, which brought together 19 laboratories from five countries to investigate active submarine volcanism along the Mid-Atlantic Ridge near the Azores. He was also involved in the European VENTOX programme, which investigated the effects of naturally occurring toxic substances, including heavy metals and natural radioactivity, from hydrothermal vents on surrounding fauna and microbial communities.

== Awards ==
- 1993: Philip Morris Scientific Prize for research on biodiversity in extreme environments.

== Bibliography ==
- Desbruyères, Daniel (October 2010). Les trésors des abysses [The Treasures of the Abyss] (in French). Versailles: Éditions Quae. p. 184. ISBN 978-2-7592-0605-6.
