= Lucien Laubier =

French oceanographer (1936-2008)

- Born: 22 September 1936; Lille
- Died: 15 June 2008 (aged 71); Marseille
- Scientific career
- Fields: oceanographer

Lucien Laubier (22 September 1936 – 15 June 2008) was a French oceanographer. He began his scientific career at the Arago Laboratory in Banyuls-sur-Mer (now the Oceanological Observatory) where he conducted underwater studies of coral resources at depths between 20 and 42 metres. He was appointed director of the Marseilles Centre of Oceanology in 1996 and, after serving his term of office, was appointed a director of the Oceanographic Institute in 2001.

== Publications ==
- Laubier, Julien (1992). Odile Jacob (ed.). Vingt Mille Vies Sous La Mer. ISBN 2-7381-0164-X.
