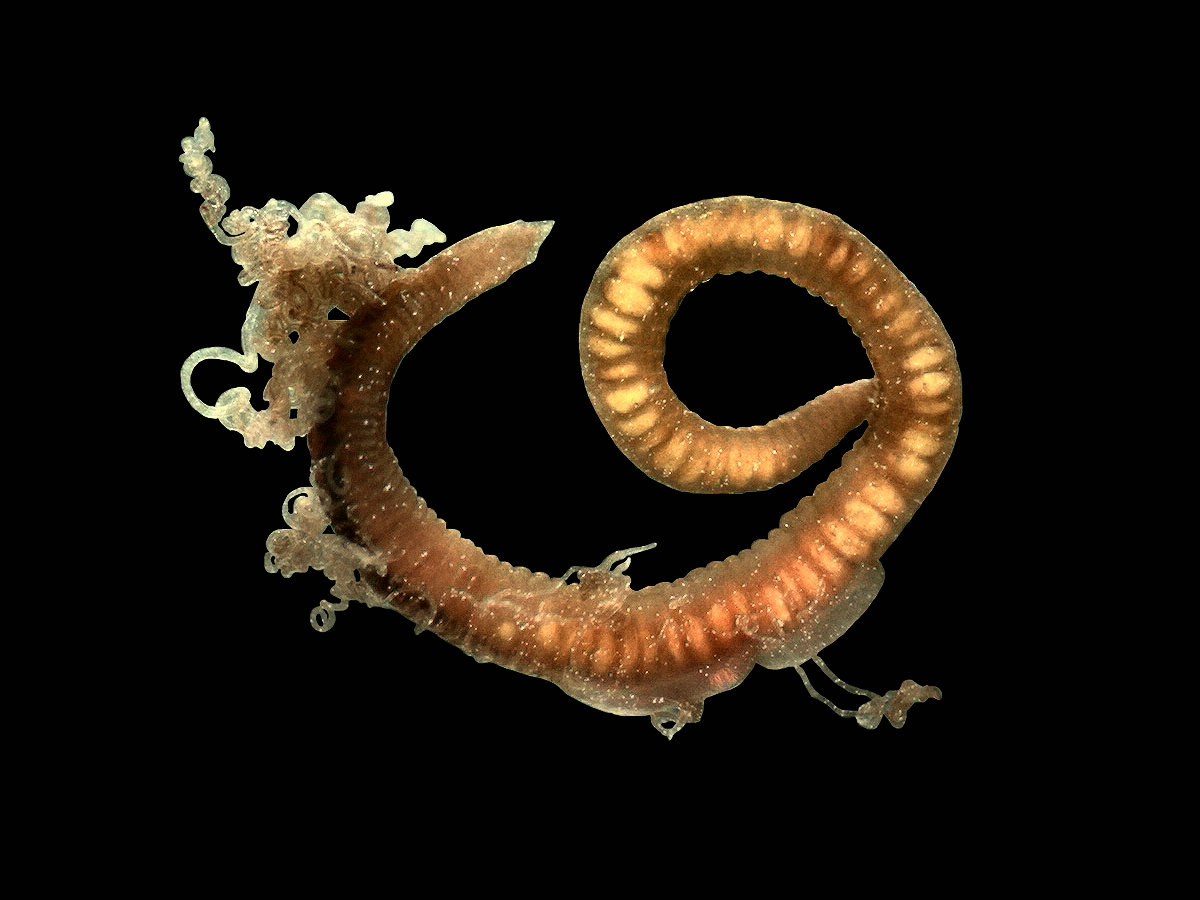
- Cirratulus cirratus

Scientific classification
- Kingdom: Animalia
- Phylum: Annelida
- Clade: Pleistoannelida
- Clade: Sedentaria
- Order: Terebellida
- Family: Cirratulidae; Ryckholt, 1851

Genera
- See text

= Cirratulidae =

Family of annelid worms

Cirratulidae is a family of marine polychaete worms. Members of the family are found worldwide, mostly living in mud or rock crevices. Most are deposit feeders, but some graze on algae or are suspension feeders. Although subject to multiple revisions over time, cirratulids are among the few polychaete clades with a verified fossil record.

== Description ==
Cirratulids vary in size from one to twenty centimetres long. They are mostly burrowers in soft sediments but some live in rock crevices. The head is conical or wedge-shaped and has no antennae. The body is generally cylindrical, tapering at both ends. Cirratulids are characterised by a large number of simple elongate filaments along the body. Some of these occur as an anterior cluster of tentacles, grooved for deposit-feeding, but the majority, the branchiae, are found one pair per segment, and do not have grooves. The chaetae (bristles) are simple capillaries, usually with hooks, and emerge directly from the body wall. There are no anal cirri (slender sensory appendages). The worm is usually buried with only the writhing branchial filaments visible. Some cirratulids can build tubes of calcium carbonate. A study by Guido et al. (2024) reported cirratulid aggregates as the first known example in the animal kingdom of the so called double-phased biomineralization process.

When alive, the body, branchiae and tentacular filaments are often red, orange or yellow, though species of Dodecaceria are dark green or black. Terebellidae and other worm families may superficially look similar to cirratulids with a mass of filaments. However, in terebellids, the filaments arise from the mouth or are restricted to the anterior three segments, whereas cirratulid branchiae occur throughout the body, one pair per segment.

== Taxonomy ==
The genera are poorly defined and Blake undertook a partial revision in 1996. He divided them into three groups, the multi-tentaculate genera such as Cirratulus and Cirriformia, the bi-tentaculate soft-substrate genera such as Caulleriella, Chaetozone, Tharyx and the bi-tentaculate hard substrate genera such as Dodecaceria.

There is considerable confusion as to the phylogenetic relationships in the family and Blake suggests that many species with global distributions will be found to represent species complexes within which some species are presently undescribed.

== Fossil record ==
The earliest cirratulid on record, Dodecaceria cretacea (Voigt, 1971), later reclassified as the ichnofossil Caulostrepsis cretacea, was responsible for leaving boring traces on Late Cretaceous coral reefs. There's no known Paleocene record, but from the Eocene onwards, reports of cirratulid bioconstructions in South Africa and the Americas are relatively frequent. Two species within Diplochaetetes, D. longitubus (Weissermel, 1913) and D. longitubus vermicularis (Weissermel, 1926), are known from Namibian sites. The species D. mexicanus (Wilson, 1986) was reported in Oligocene to Miocene fossiliferous sites across multiple locations in the pacific coasts of the Americas, from Mexico to Peru. Recent cirratulid bioconstructions found in the same areas are attributed to the genus Dodecaceria.

Several authors, such as Reish (1952), Fischer et al. (1989, 2000) and Guido et al. (2024) have reported many similarities between Dodecaceria and Diplochaetetes bioconstructions, but whether the two genera should be considered synonyms or not remains unresolved.

== Genera ==
- Ambo
- Aphelochaeta Blake, 1991
- Caulleriella Chamberlin, 1919
- Chaetozone Malmgren, 1867
- Cirratulispio
- Cirratulus Lamarck, 1801
- Cirrhatula
- Cirrhatulus
- Cirriformia Hartman, 1936
- Diplochaetetes † Weissermel, 1913
- Dodecaceria Örsted, 1843
- Heterocirrus Grube, 1855
- Labranda
- Monticellina Laubier, 1961
- Naraganseta
- Pentacirrus
- Promenia
- Protocirrineris Czerniavsky, 1881
- Pseudocirratulus
- Tharyx Webster & Benedict, 1887
- Timarete Kinberg, 1866
- Audouina Hartman, 1936
- Audouinia Quatrefages, 1865
- Cirrineris misspelling of Cirrhineris Blainville, 1828
- Cirrhineris Blainville, 1828 (nomen dubium)
