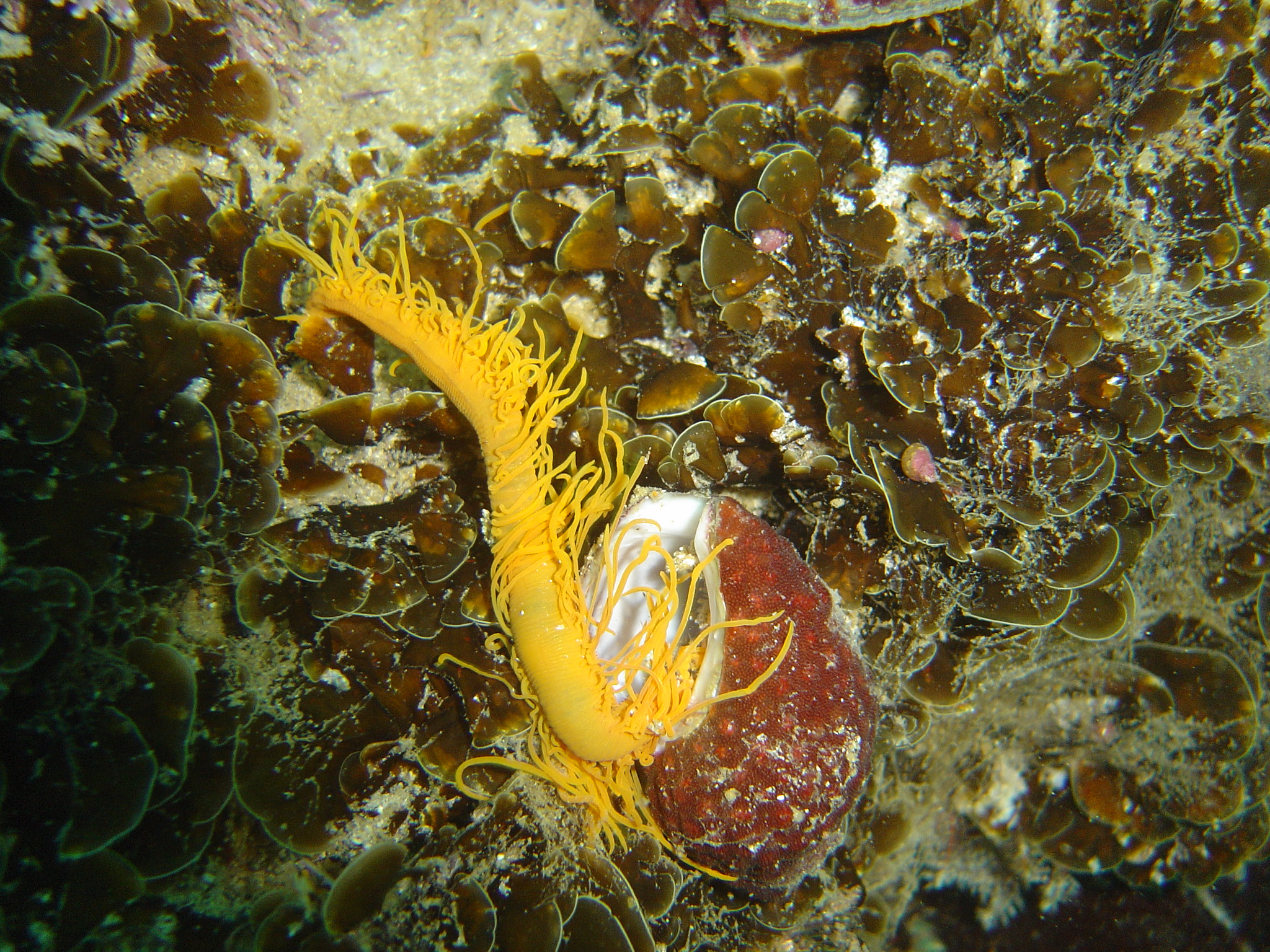
- Cirriformia capensis (Cirratulidae)

Scientific classification
- Kingdom: Animalia
- Phylum: Annelida
- Clade: Pleistoannelida
- Clade: Sedentaria
- Infraclass: Canalipalpata
- Order: Terebellida

Families
- Several, see text

= Terebellida =

Order of annelid worms

Terebellida make up an order of the Polychaeta class, commonly referred to as "bristle worms". Together with the Sabellida, the Spionida and some enigmatic families of unclear taxonomic relationship (e.g. the Saccocirridae), they make up the subclass Canalipalpata, one of the three main clades of polychaetes. Like most polychaetes, almost all members of the Terebellida are marine organisms. Most are small, sessile detritivores (deposit feeders) which live in small tubes they build from mud or similar substrate, or burrow in the sand. Their central nervous system displays characteristic apomorphies.

== Systematics ==
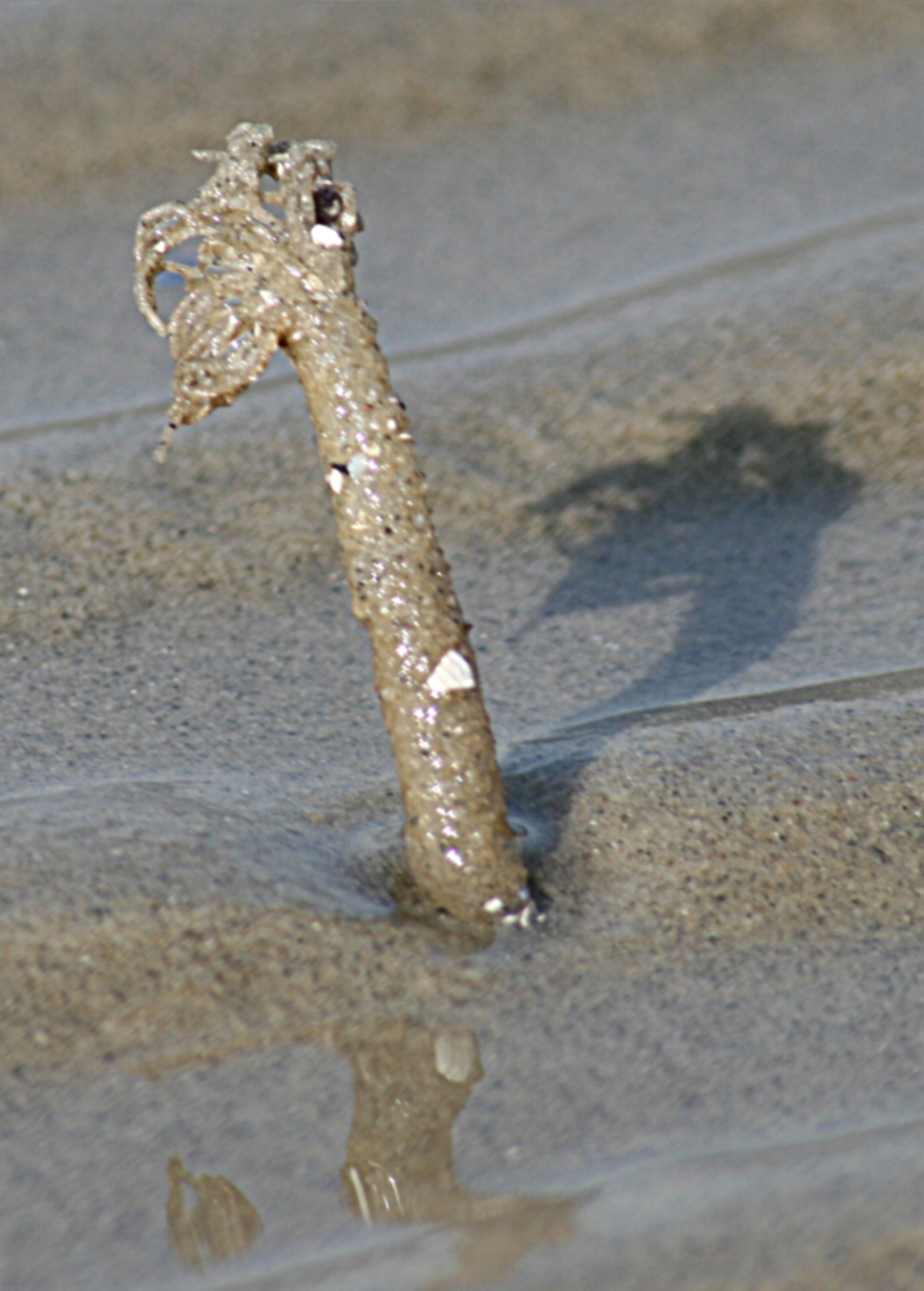
Living tube of Lanice conchilega (Terebellidae) in the Wadden Sea at low tide. Such structures can be preserved as fossils.

There is little consensus on the number of families. Some treatments accept as little as five, while other authors list over a dozen. Here, the more inclusive view of the Terebellida is followed, based on a major review of polychaete systematics. Cladistic studies have hitherto only analyzed a rather small proportion of polychaetes; hence it may be that some of the families today included in Terebellida by most authors will eventually be again recognized to belong elsewhere.

- Acrocirridae (acrocirrids, sometimes placed in Spionida suborder)
- Alvinellidae (alvinellids)
- Ampharetidae (ampharetids)
  - Ampharetinae (ampharetines, a subfamily)
- Cirratulidae (cirratulids, sometimes placed in Spionida suborder)
- Ctenodrilidae (ctenodrilids, sometimes own suborder Ctenodrilida)
- Fauveliopsidae (fauveliopsids, sometimes own suborder Fauveliopsida)
- Flabelligeridae (flabelligerids, sometimes Flabelligerida suborder)
- Flotidae (flotids, sometimes included in Flabelligeridae)
- Pectinariidae (pectinariids, commonly referred to as trumpet worms or ice cream cone worms)
- Poeobiidae (poeobiids, sometimes own suborder Poeobiida or included in Flabelligerida suborder)
- Sternaspidae (sternaspids, sometimes own suborder Sternaspida)
- Terebellidae (terebellids, commonly referred to as spaghetti worms)
- Trichobranchidae (trichobranchids)
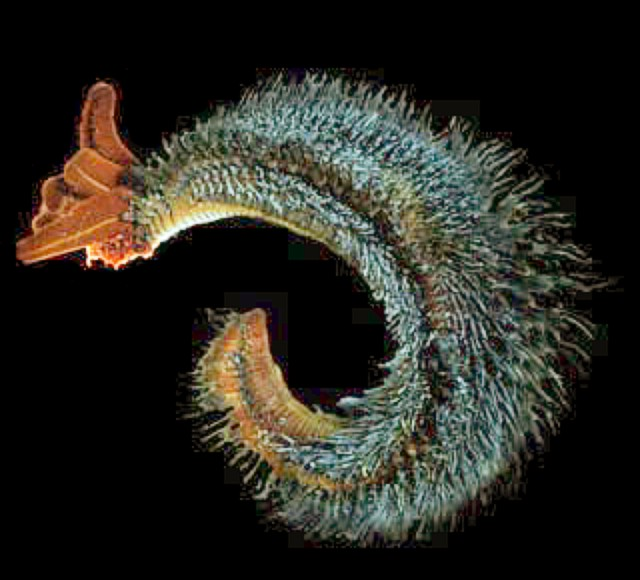
Alvinella pompejana, an Alvinellidae

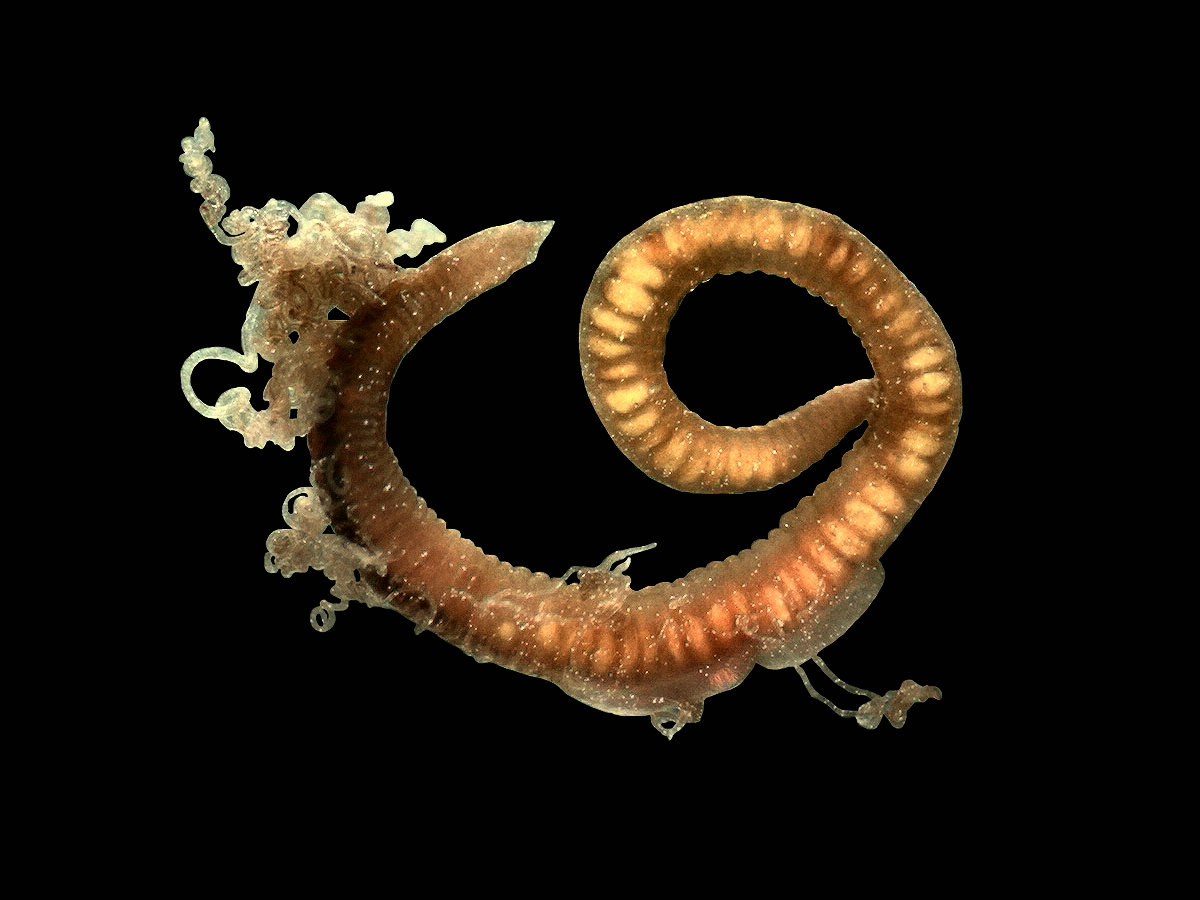
Cirratulus cirratus, a Cirratulidae

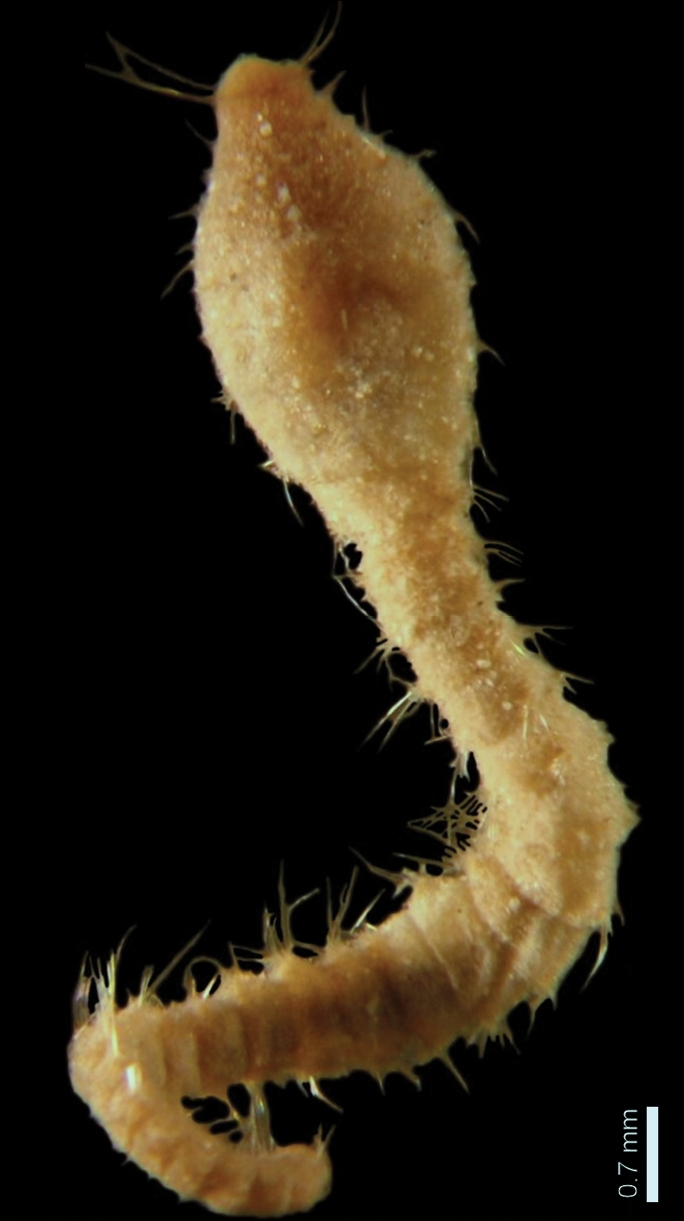
Diplocirrus incognitus, a Flabelligeridae

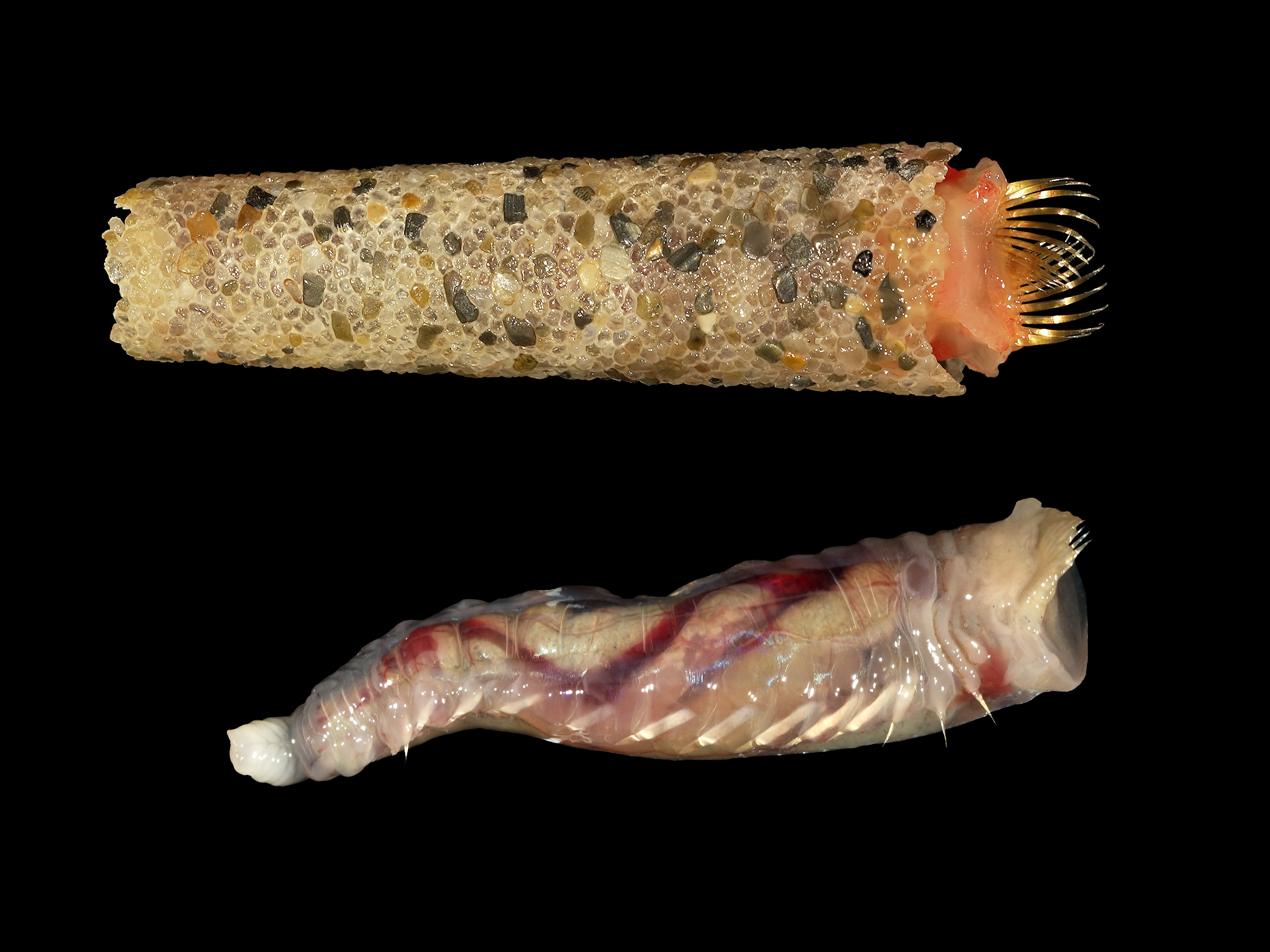
Lagis koreni, a Pectinariidae (with its tube)

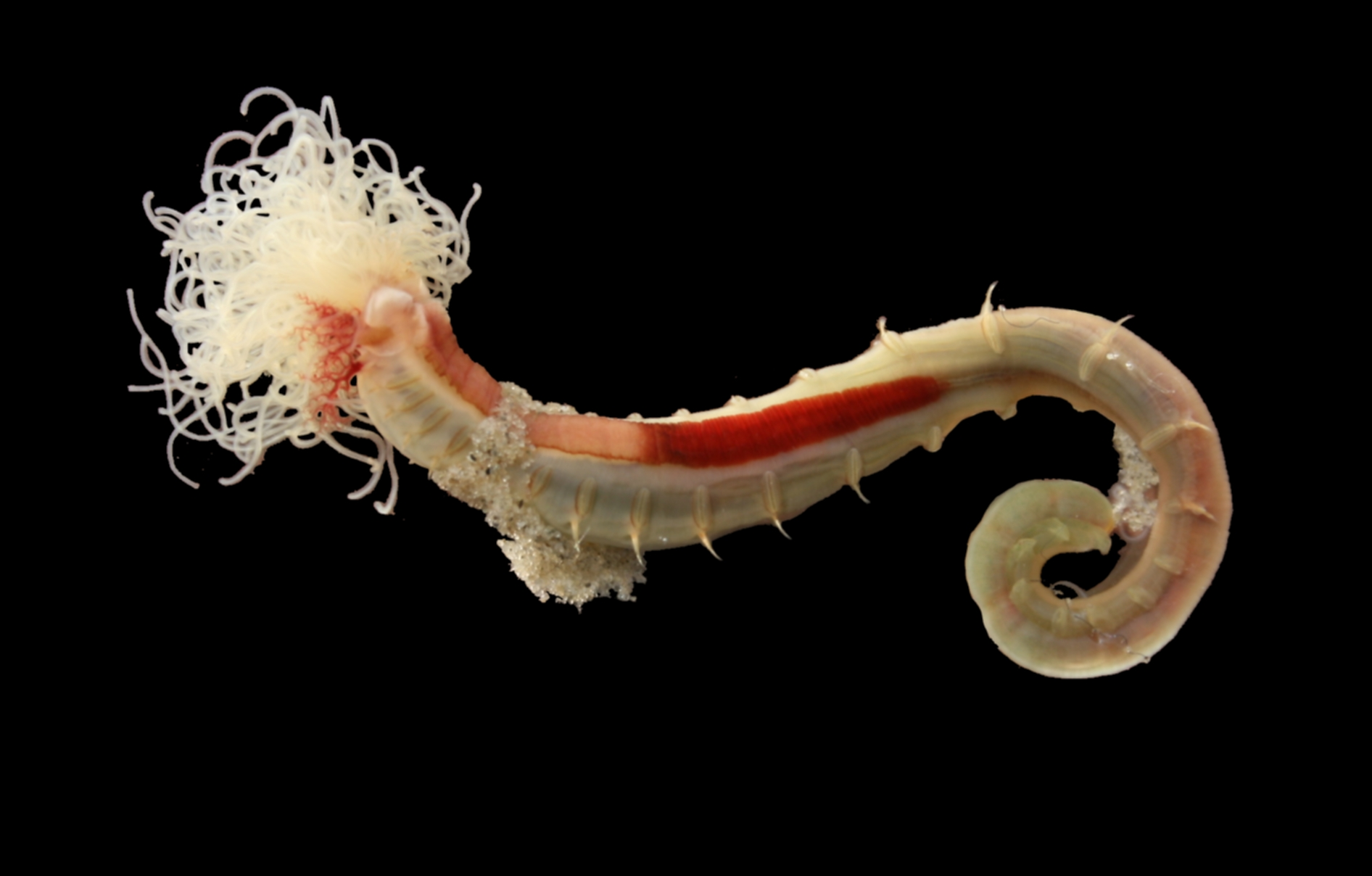
Lanice conchilega, a Terebellidae

== Notable species ==
A notable terebellid is the Pompeii worm (Alvinella pompejana), an alvinellid. It is the most heat-tolerant complex organism known on Earth. Found near hydrothermal vents deep in the Pacific Ocean, it thrives at a temperature of 50 °C (122 °F). This is near the theoretical limit for eukaryotes, whose mitochondria disintegrate at about 55 °C (131 °F).

Seven species of pelagic (free-swimming) terebellids have recently been discovered, including Swima in 2009 and Teuthidodrilus in 2010. These seven species have been assigned to four new genera, forming a phylogenetic clade within the Acrocirridae family.

== Fossil record ==
Polychaetes lack a firm skeleton, so they do not fossilize well. For this reason, only a small number of prehistoric bristle worms have been described. Several of these have been placed in the Terebellida suborder, though often only tentatively so, owing to the ongoing uncertainties about polychaete phylogeny. However, as the terebellid habit of constructing characteristic tubes in which to live seems quite ancient, such structures are occasionally found in conservation Lagerstätten. Polychaete remains associated with such ichnofossils can therefore be quite certainly be allocated to the Terebellida. Prehistoric polychaete genera historically presumed to be Terebellida include the following, though most are now recognized as trace fossils of uncertain makers:

- Arthrophycus Hall, 1852
- Cryptosiphon Prantl, 1948
- Granularia Pomel, 1849
- Harlania Goppert, 1852
- Lepidenteron Fritsch, 1878
- Paraterebella Howell, 1955 (= Terebellopsis Howell, 1953)
- Proterebella Howell, 1953
- Psammosiphon Vine, 1882
- Scalarituba Weller, 1899
- Scolecoderma Salter, 1855
- Terebellites Howell, 1943
- Terebelloides Desio, 1940
- Terebellolites Desio, 1940
- Terebellopsis Leymerie, 1844 (see also Paraterebella)
