= List of annelid families =

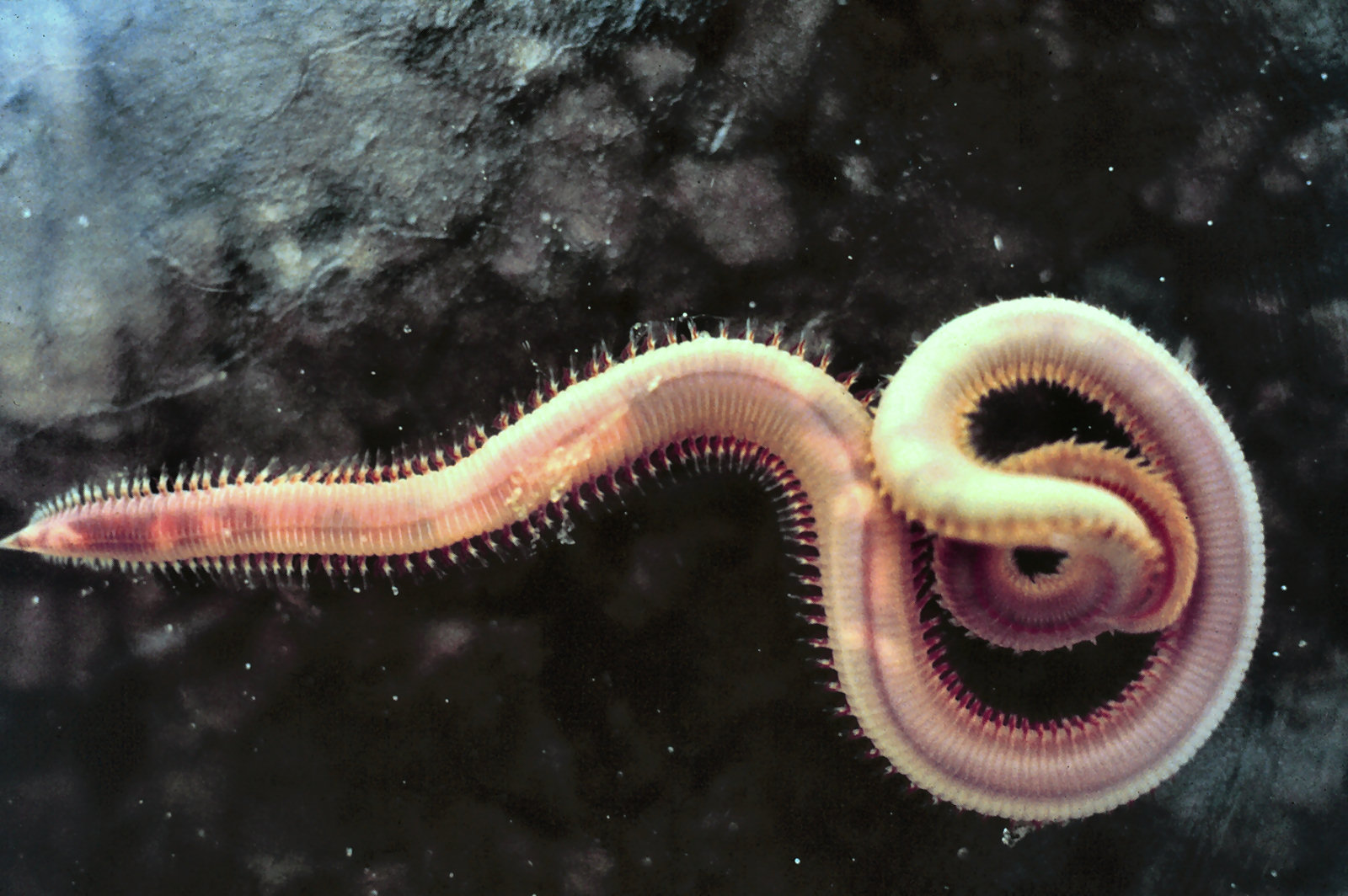
Bloodworm Glycera

List of annelid families describes the taxa relationships in the phylum Annelida, which contains more than 17,000 extant species including ragworms, earthworms, and leeches.

== Class Polychaeta ==
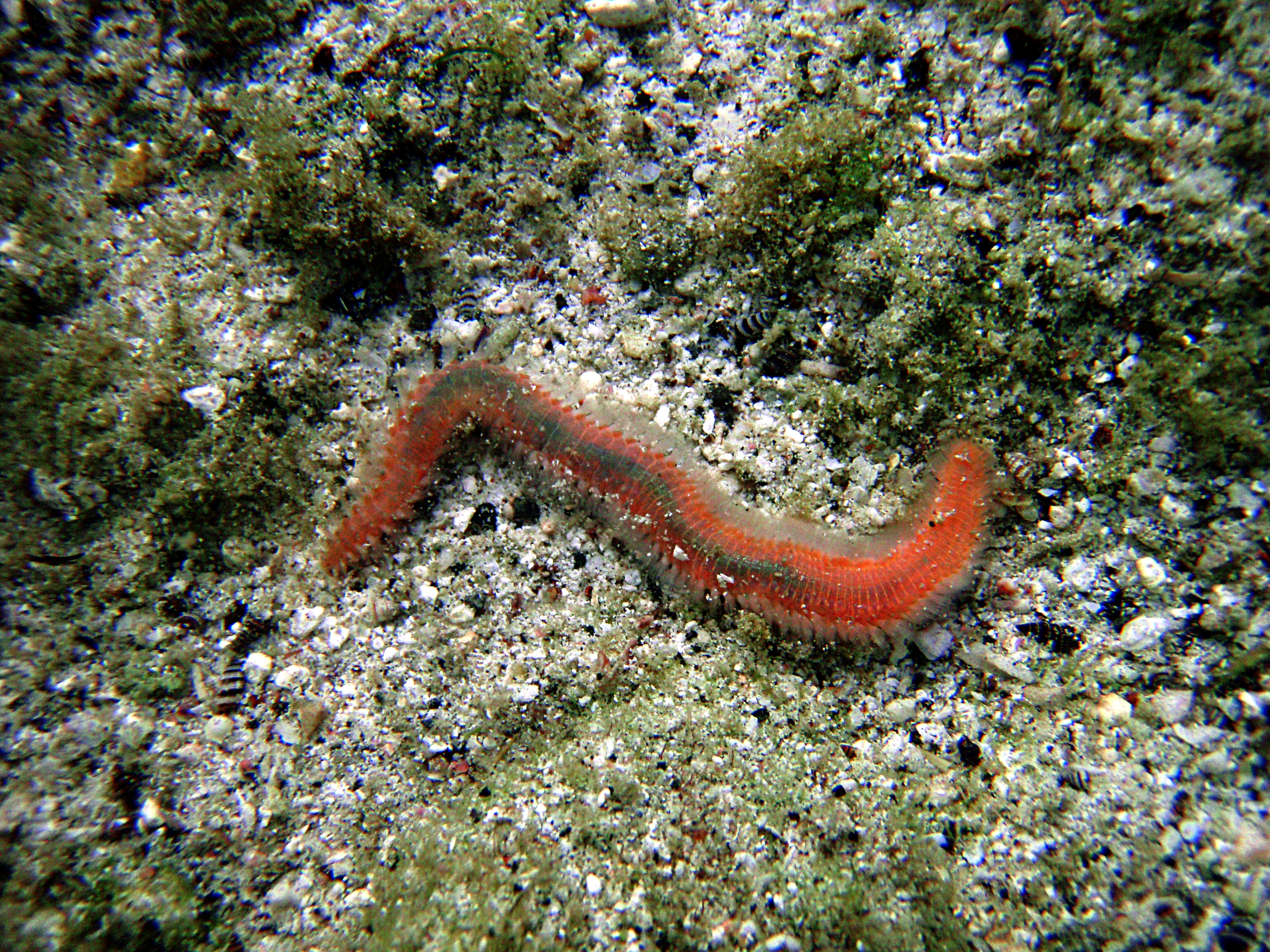
Hesionidae Eurythoe complanata

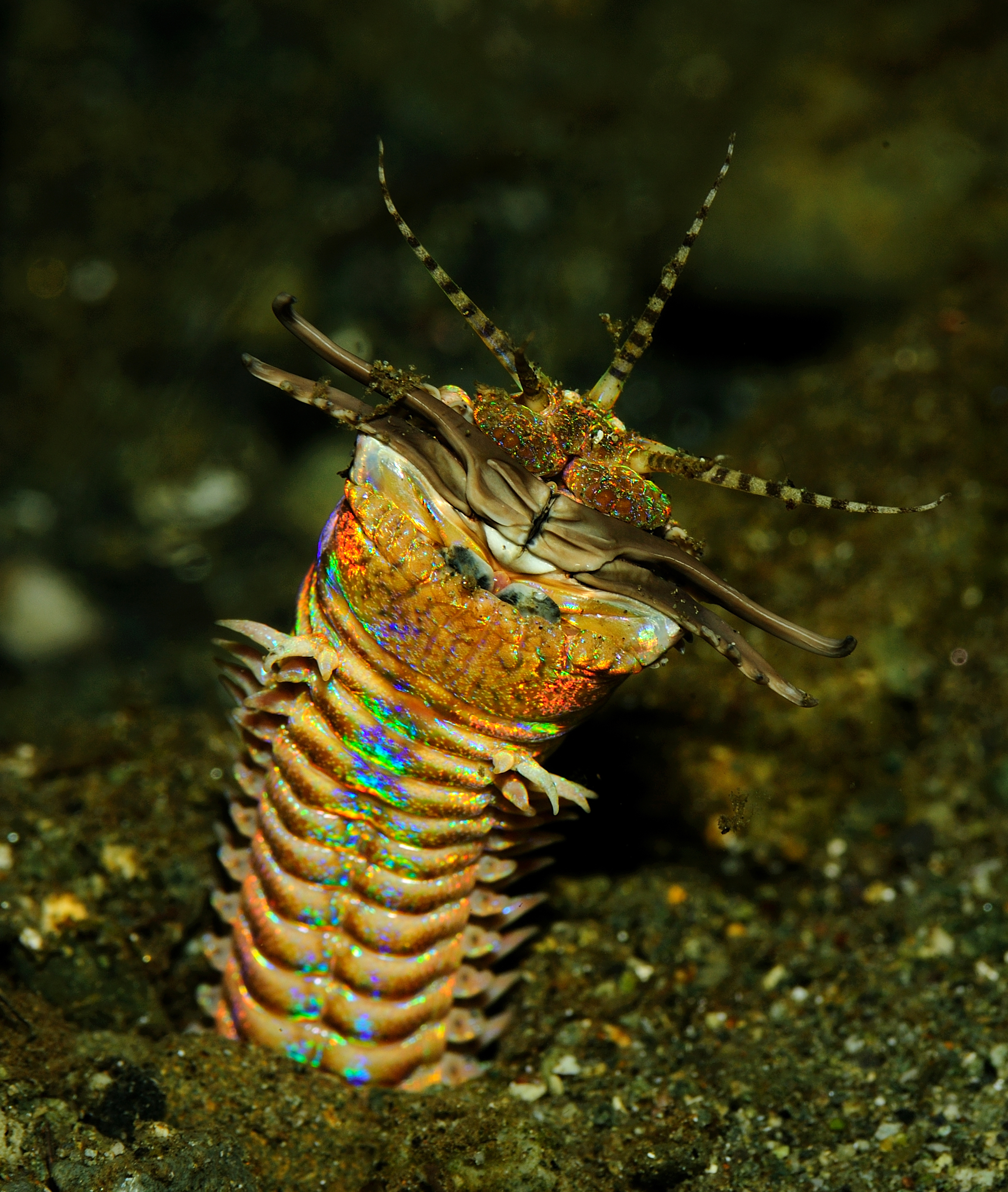
Opheliidae Eunice aphroditois

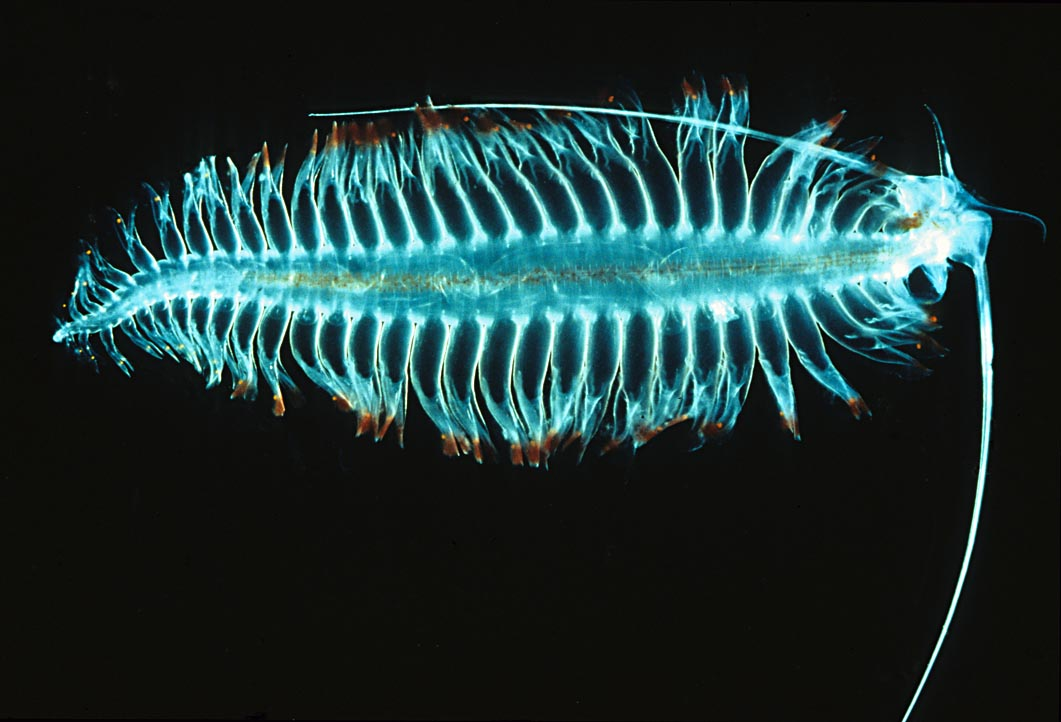
Tomopteriskils

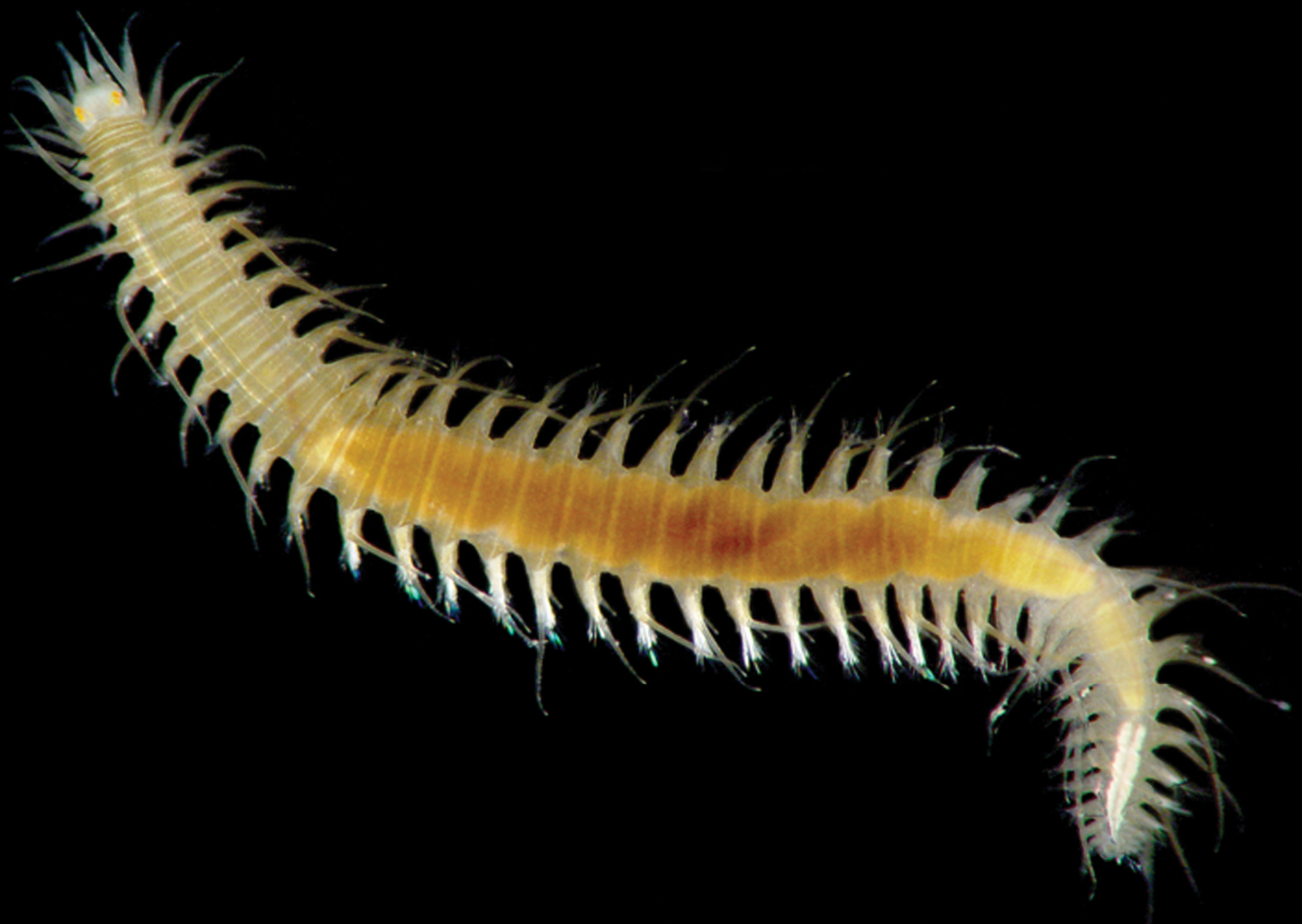
Hesionidae Oxydromus pugettensis

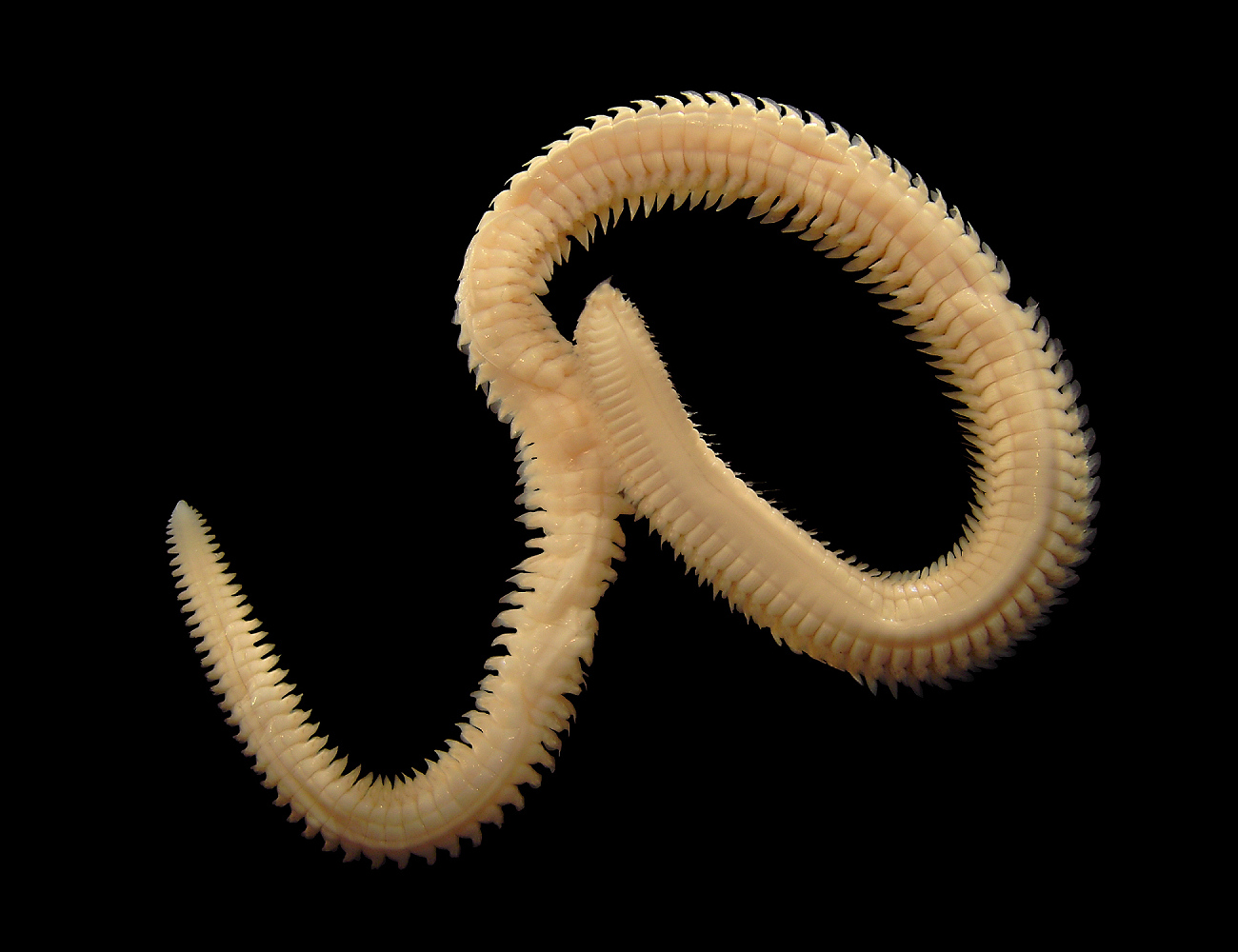
Nephtys hombergii

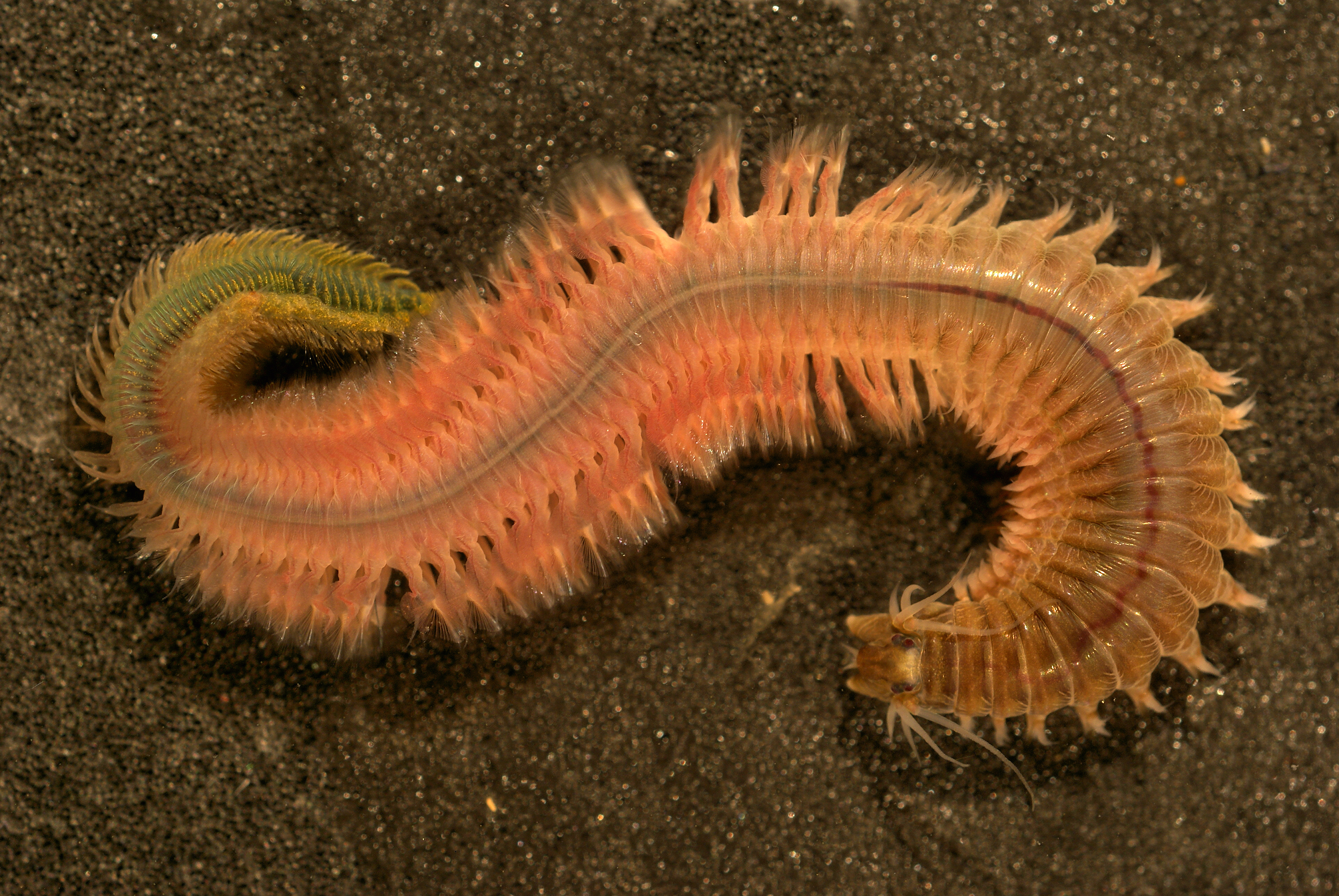
Nerididae Alitta succinea

=== Palpata ===
- Sub-class Errantia

Order Amphinomida

  - Family Amphinomidae Savigny in Lamarck, 1818 нЖсн
  - Family Euphrosinidae Williams, 1851

Order Eunicida

  - Family Dorvilleidae Chamberlin, 1919
  - Family Eunicidae Berthold, 1827
  - Family Hartmaniellidae Imajima, 1977
  - Family Lumbrineridae Schmarda, 1861
  - Family Oenonidae Kinberg, 1865
  - Family Onuphidae Kinberg, 1865

Order Phyllodocida

  - Family Acoetidae Kinberg, 1856
  - Family Alciopidae Ehlers, 1864
  - Family Aphroditidae Malmgren, 1867
  - Family Chrysopetalidae Ehlers, 1864
  - Family Eulepethidae Chamberlin, 1919
  - Family Glyceridae Grube, 1850
  - Family Goniadidae Kinberg, 1866
  - Family Hesionidae Grube, 1850
  - Family Ichthyotomidae Eisig, 1906
  - Family Iospilidae Bergstroem, 1914
  - Family Lacydoniidae Bergstroem, 1914
  - Family Lopadorrhynchidae Claparede, 1868
  - Family Myzostomatidae Benham, 1896
  - Family Nautiliniellidae Miura and Laubier, 1990
  - Family Nephtyidae Grube, 1850
  - Family Nereididae Johnston, 1865
  - Family Paralacydoniidae Pettibone, 1963
  - Family Pholoidae Kinberg, 1858
  - Family Phyllodocidae Oersted, 1843
  - Family Pilargidae Saint-Joseph, 1899
  - Family Pisionidae Southern, 1914
  - Family Polynoidae Malmgren, 1867
  - Family Pontodoridae Bergstroem, 1914
  - Family Sigalionidae Malmgren, 1867
  - Family Sphaerodoridae Malmgren, 1867
  - Family Syllidae Grube, 1850
  - Family Tomopteridae Johnston, 1865
  - Family Typhloscolecidae Uljanin, 1878

Incertae sedis

  - Family Aberrantidae Wolf, 1987
  - Family Nerillidae Levinsen, 1883
  - Family Spintheridae Johnston, 1865
- Canalipalpata

=== Scolecida ===
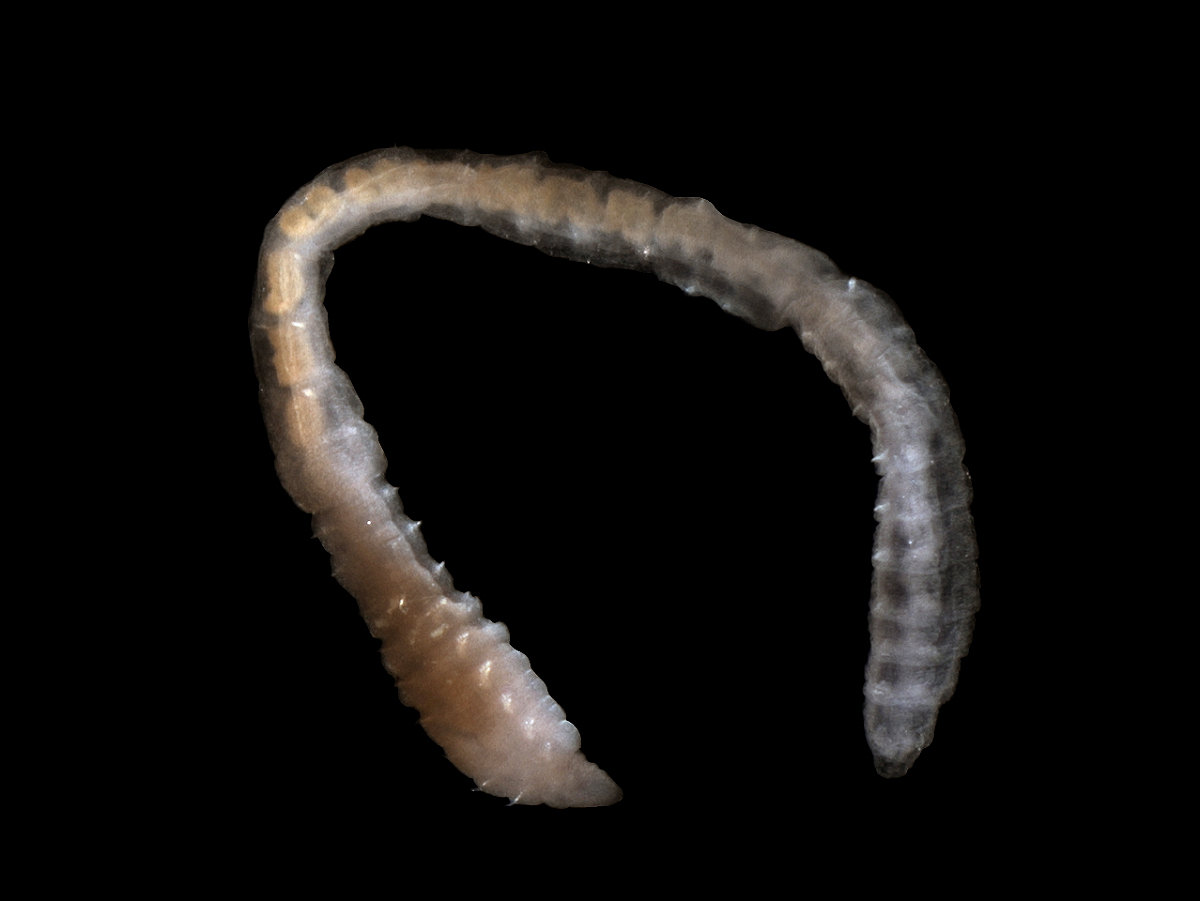
Capitellidae Capitella capitata

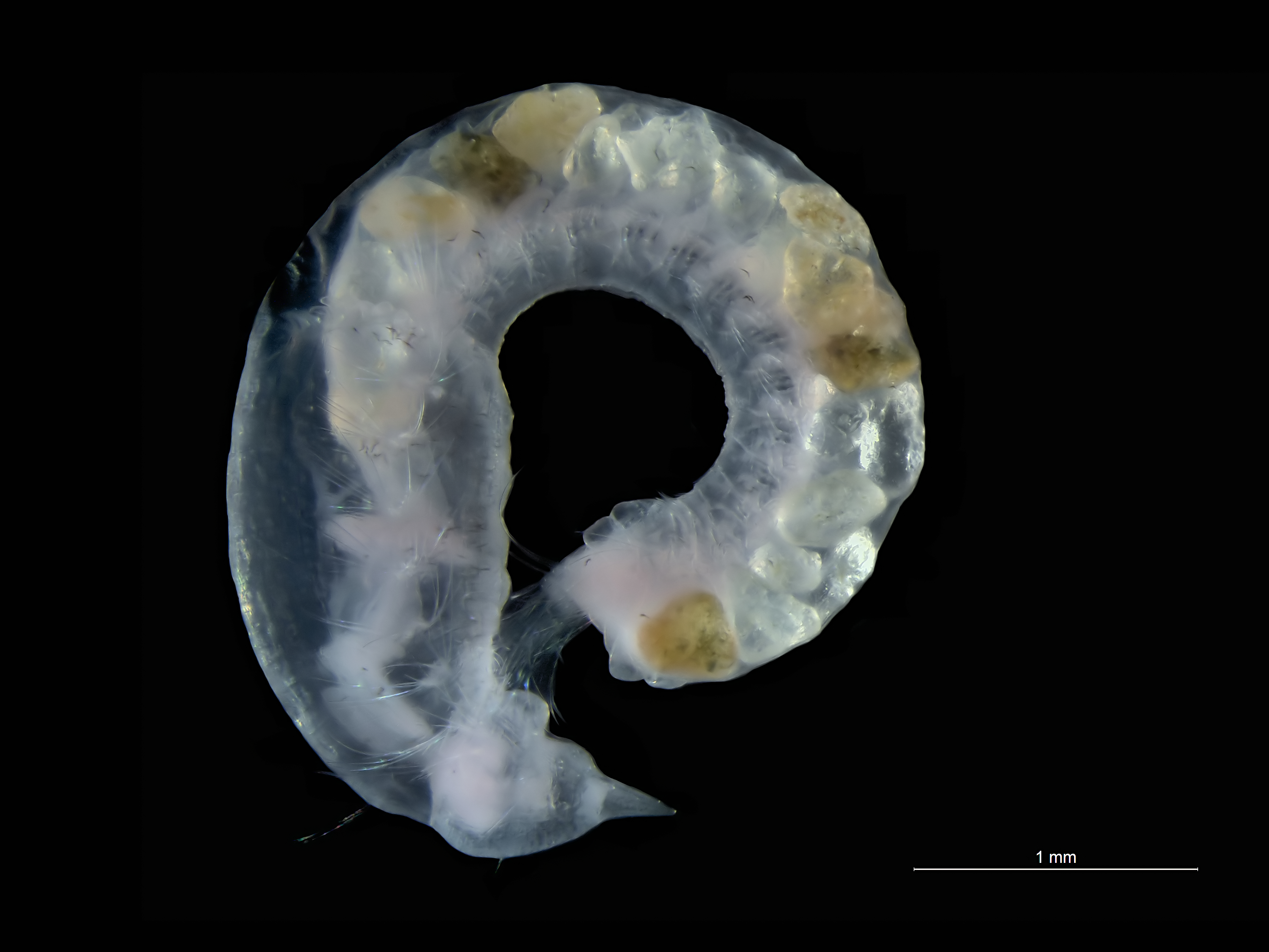
Opheliidae Euzonus flabelligerus

- Family Aeolosomatidae
- Family Arenicolidae
- Family Capitellidae
- Family Cossuridae
- Family Maldanidae
- Family Opheliidae
- Family Orbiniidae
- Family Paraonidae
- Family Parergodrilidae
- Family Potamodrilidae
- Family Psammodrilidae
- Family Questidae
- Family Scalibregmatidae

=== Echiura ===
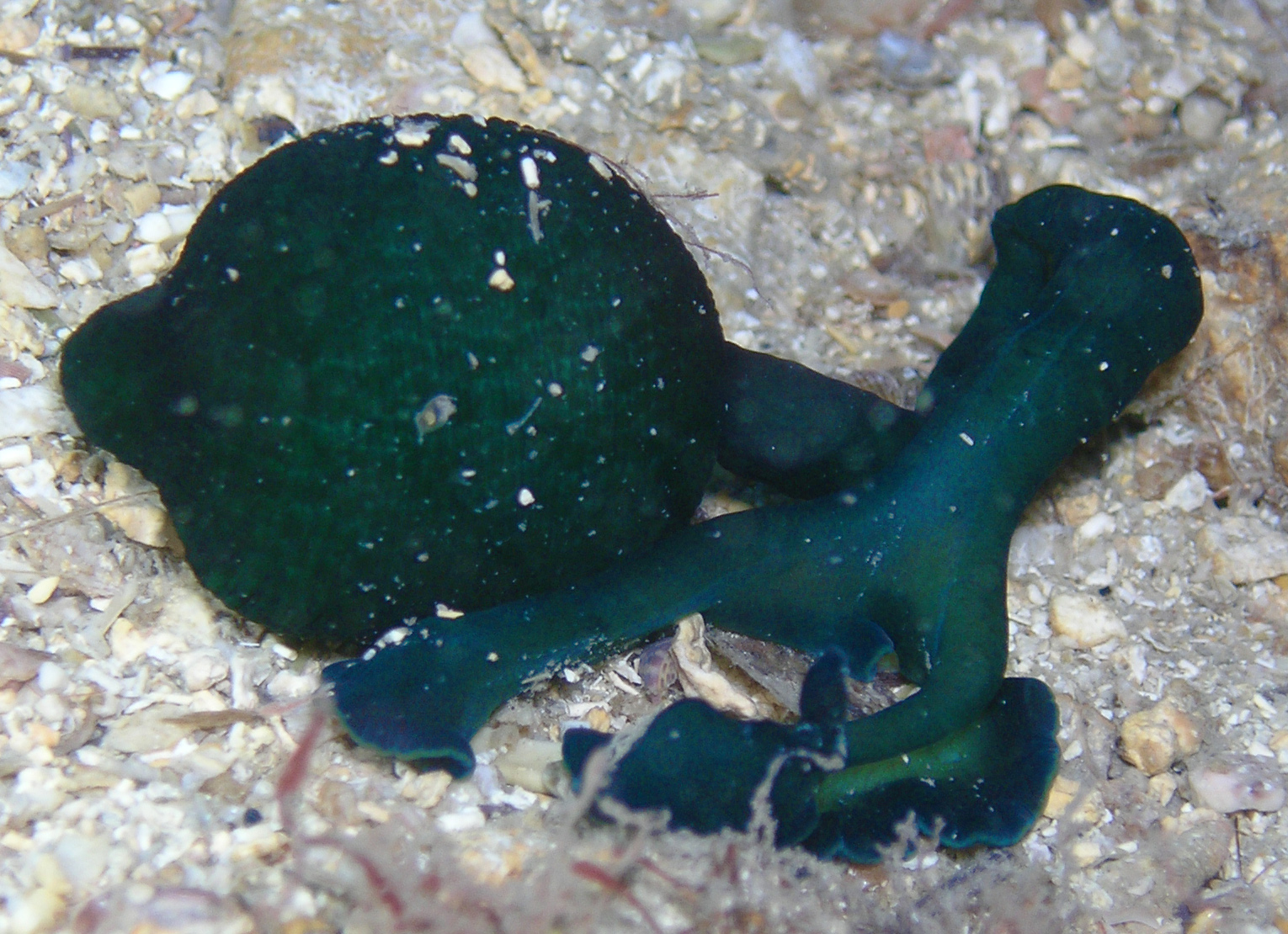
Bonellia viridis

Order Echiuroidea

- Suborder Bonelliida
  - Family Bonelliidae
  - Family Ikedidae
- Suborder Echiurida
  - Family Echiuridae
  - Family Thalassematidae
  - Family Urechidae

== Class Clitellata ==
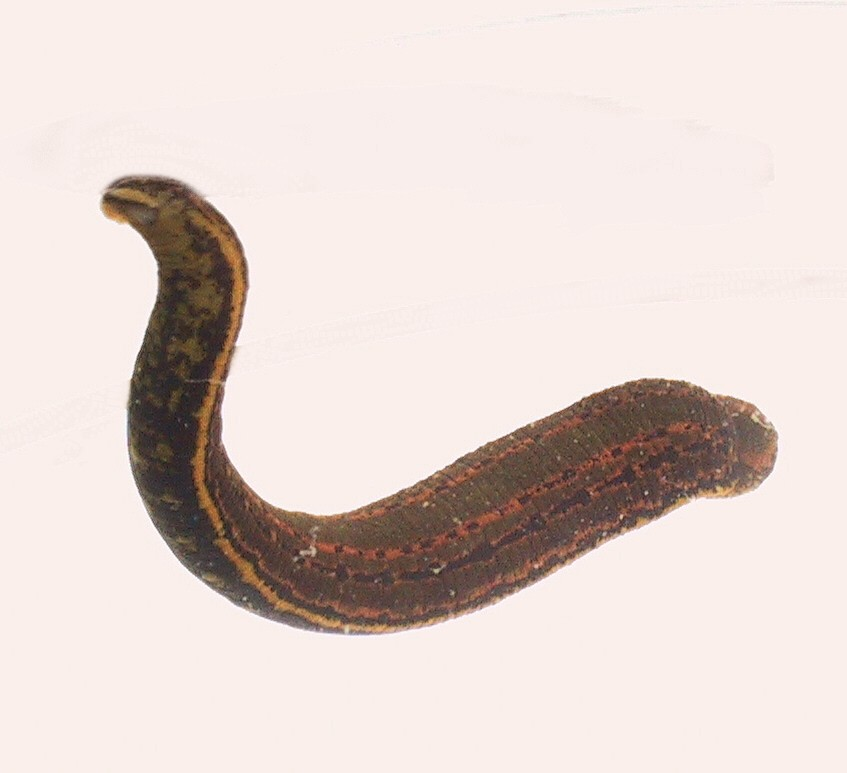
Hirudo medicinalis leech

    - Order Branchiobdellida
- Subclass Hirudinea (Leech)
  - Infraclass Acanthobdellidea
  - Infraclass Euhirudinea
    - Order Arhynchobdellida
      - Suborder Erpobdelliformes
        - Family Erpobdellidae Blanchard, 1894
        - Family Gastrostomobdellidae Richardson, 1971
        - Family Orobdellidae Nakano, Ramlah & Hikida, 2012
        - Family Salifidae Johansson, 1910
      - Suborder Hirudiniformes
        - Family Cylicobdellidae
        - Family Haemadipsidae
        - Family Haemopidae
        - Family Hirudinidae
        - Family Semiscolecidae
        - Family Xerobdellidae
    - Order Rhynchobdellida
        - Family Glossiphoniidae
        - Family Ozobranchidae (disputed)
        - Family Piscicolidae
    - Order Haplotaxida
      - Suborder Haplotaxina
        - Family Haplotaxidae
      - Suborder Moniligastrina
        - Family Moniligastridae
      - Suborder Lumbricina
        - Family Alluroididae
        - Family Eudrilidae
        - Family Glossoscolecidae
        - Family Lumbricidae
        - Family Hormogastridae
        - Family Ailoscolidae
        - Family Lutodrilidae
        - Family Sparganophilidae
        - Family Criodrilidae
        - Family Ocnerodrilidae
        - Family Acanthodrilidae
        - Family Octochaetidae
        - Family Exxidae
        - Family Megascolecidae
        - Family Microchaetidae
      - Suborder Tubificina
        - Family Dorydrilidae
        - Family Enchytraeidae
        - Family Naididae
        - Family Opstocystidae
        - Family Phreodrilidae

== Class Machaeridia † ==
- Family †Plumulitidae
- Family †Turrilepadidae
- Family †Lepidocoleidae

== Subphylum Sipuncula ==
- Class Phascolosomatidea
  - Order Aspidosiphoniformes
    - Family Aspidosiphonidae
  - Order Phascolosomatiformes
    - Family Phascolosomatidae
- Class Sipunculidea
  - Order Golfingiiformes
    - Family Golfingiidae
    - Family Phascolionidae
    - Family Themistidae
  - Order Sipunculiformes
    - Family Sipunculidae
