= Vanadis (annelid) =

Scientific classification
- Kingdom: Animalia
- Phylum: Annelida
- Clade: Pleistoannelida
- Subclass: Errantia
- Order: Phyllodocida
- Family: Alciopidae
- Genus: Vanadis; Claparède, 1870

Species
- See text

Genus of annelid worms

Vanadis is a genus of polychaetes belonging to the family Phyllodocidae.

The genus has cosmopolitan distribution. It is notable for representing a fourth phylum to have evolved high-resolution vision, namely eyes able to focus on and interact with specific objects against the background.

Species:

- Vanadis antarctica (McIntosh, 1885)
- Vanadis brevirostris Støp-Bowitz, 1991
- Vanadis crystallina Greeff, 1876
- Vanadis formosa Claparède, 1870
- Vanadis longissima (Levinsen, 1885)
- Vanadis macrophthalma Greeff, 1876
- Vanadis melanophthalmus Greeff, 1885
- Vanadis minuta Treadwell, 1906
- Vanadis nans (Chamberlin, 1919)
- Vanadis studeri Apstein, 1893
- Vanadis tagensis Dales, 1955
- Vanadis violacea Apstein, 1893
