= Microphthalmidae =

Scientific classification
- Kingdom: Animalia
- Phylum: Annelida
- Clade: Pleistoannelida
- Subclass: Errantia
- Order: Phyllodocida
- Suborder: Nereidiformia
- Family: Microphthalmidae; Hartmann-Schröder, 1971

Family of segmented worms (annelids) in the suborder Nereidiformia

Microphthalmidae is a family of segmented worms (annelids) in the suborder Nereidiformia. According to WoRMS, Microphthalmidae was originally named Microphthalminae, and was raised to the family rank in 2019 by Salazar-Vallejo et al.

== Etymology ==
The name of this family originated from the genus Microphthalmus Mecznikow, 1865, which in turn is composed of micro- (small) and ophthalmus (eye).

== Taxonomy ==
As of 21 August 2025, WoRMS included the following genera in this family:

- Fridericiella Hartmann-Schröder, 1959
- Hesionella Hartman, 1939
- Hesionides Friedrich, 1937
- Microphthalmus Mecznikow, 1865
- Pleijelius Salazar-Vallejo & Orensanz, 2006
- Struwela Hartmann-Schröder, 1959
- Uncopodarke Uchida in Uchida, Lopéz & Sato, 2019
- Westheideius Salazar-Vallejo, de León-González & Carrera-Parra, 2019: Include only one species, namely Westheideius hamosus (Westheide, 1982)by Professor Dr. Wilfried Westheide, who discovered and named this species.
