= Maupasia =

Scientific classification
- Domain: Eukaryota
- Kingdom: Animalia
- Phylum: Annelida
- Clade: Pleistoannelida
- Subclass: Errantia
- Order: Phyllodocida
- Family: Lopadorrhynchidae
- Genus: Maupasia; Viguier, 1886

Type species
- Maupasia coeca Viguier, 1886

Species
- Maupasia brodskyi Uschakov, 1957; Maupasia coeca Viguier, 1886; Maupasia gracilis (Reibisch, 1893); Maupasia isochaeta (Reibisch, 1895); Maupasia magna Southern, 1909; Maupasia rufa Giard, 1890

Synonyms
- Haliplanella Treadwell, 1943 (senior homonym suppressed by ICZN in favour of Haliplanella Hand, 1956); Haliplanes [genus misspelling] (Spelling variation of Halyplanes); Halyplanes Reibisch, 1893 (subjective synonym)

Genus of annelids

Maupasia is a genus of polychaete worms.

The name is a tribute to French librarian, zoologist and botanist Émile Maupas (1842–1916).
