= Yndolaciidae =

Scientific classification
- Kingdom: Animalia
- Phylum: Annelida
- Clade: Pleistoannelida
- Subclass: Errantia
- Order: Phyllodocida
- Family: Yndolaciidae

Genera
- Paryndolacia; Yndolacia; Yndolaciella

Family of annelid worms

Yndolaciidae is a family of polychaetes belonging to the order Phyllodocida.

Genera:

- Paryndolacia Buzhinskaja, 2004
- Yndolacia Støp-Bowitz, 1987
- Yndolaciella Buzhinskaja, 2004
