= Sagitella =

Scientific classification
- Domain: Eukaryota
- Kingdom: Animalia
- Phylum: Annelida
- Clade: Pleistoannelida
- Subclass: Errantia
- Order: Phyllodocida
- Family: Typhloscolecidae
- Genus: Sagitella; Wagner, 1872

Genus of annelids

Sagitella is a genus of annelids belonging to the family Typhloscolecidae.

The genus has almost cosmopolitan distribution.

Species:

- Sagitella bobretzkii Wagner, 1872
- Sagitella kowalewskii Wagner, 1872
- Sagitella praecox Uljanin, 1878
