= Antonbruunidae =

Scientific classification
- Kingdom: Animalia
- Phylum: Annelida
- Clade: Pleistoannelida
- Subclass: Errantia
- Order: Phyllodocida
- Family: Antonbruunidae

Family of annelid worms

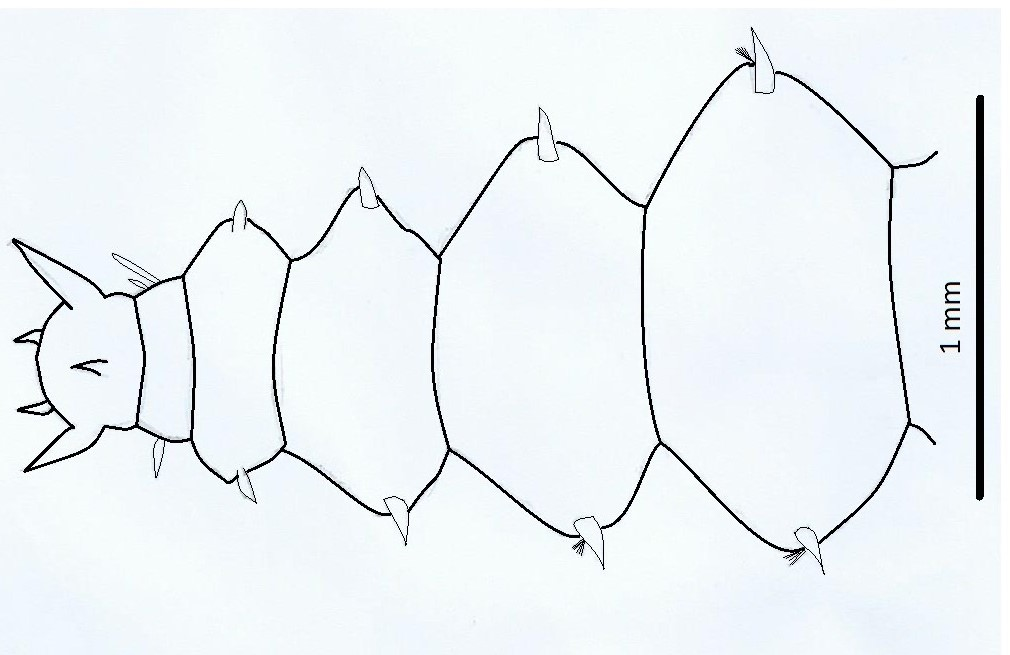
Illustration of the species Antonbruunia sociabilis, family Antonbruunidae. Anterior dorsal view.

Antonbruunidae is a family of polychaetes belonging to the order Phyllodocida.

Genera:

- Antonbruunia Hartman & Boss, 1966
