= Pholoidae =

Scientific classification
- Kingdom: Animalia
- Phylum: Annelida
- Clade: Pleistoannelida
- Subclass: Errantia
- Order: Phyllodocida
- Family: Pholoidae; Kinberg, 1858

Family of annelid worms

Pholoidae is a family of polychaetes belonging to the order Phyllodocida. It is classified as a subfamily of Sigalionidae (Annelida: Phyllodocida) by the WoRMS database.

Genera:

- Imajimapholoe Pettibone, 1992
- Laubierpholoe Pettibone, 1992
- Metaxypsamma Wolf, 1986
- Pholoe Johnston, 1839
- Taylorpholoe Pettibone, 1992
