= Ichthyotomidae =

Scientific classification
- Domain: Eukaryota
- Kingdom: Animalia
- Phylum: Annelida
- Clade: Pleistoannelida
- Subclass: Errantia
- Order: Phyllodocida
- Family: Ichthyotomidae

Family of annelids

Ichthyotomidae is a family of polychaetes belonging to the order Phyllodocida.

Genera:

- Ichthyonomis
- Ichthyotomus Eisig, 1906
