= Paralacydoniidae =

Scientific classification
- Domain: Eukaryota
- Kingdom: Animalia
- Phylum: Annelida
- Clade: Pleistoannelida
- Subclass: Errantia
- Order: Phyllodocida
- Family: Paralacydoniidae

Family of annelid worms

Paralacydoniidae is a family of polychaetes belonging to the order Phyllodocida.

Genera:

- Paralacydonia Fauvel, 1913
