= Iphionidae =

Scientific classification
- Domain: Eukaryota
- Kingdom: Animalia
- Phylum: Annelida
- Clade: Pleistoannelida
- Subclass: Errantia
- Order: Phyllodocida
- Family: Iphionidae

Family of annelid worms

Iphionidae is a family of polychaetes belonging to the order Phyllodocida.

Genera:

- Iphione Kinberg, 1856
- Iphionella McIntosh, 1885
- Iphionides Hartmann-Schröder, 1977
- Thermiphione Hartmann-Schröder, 1992
