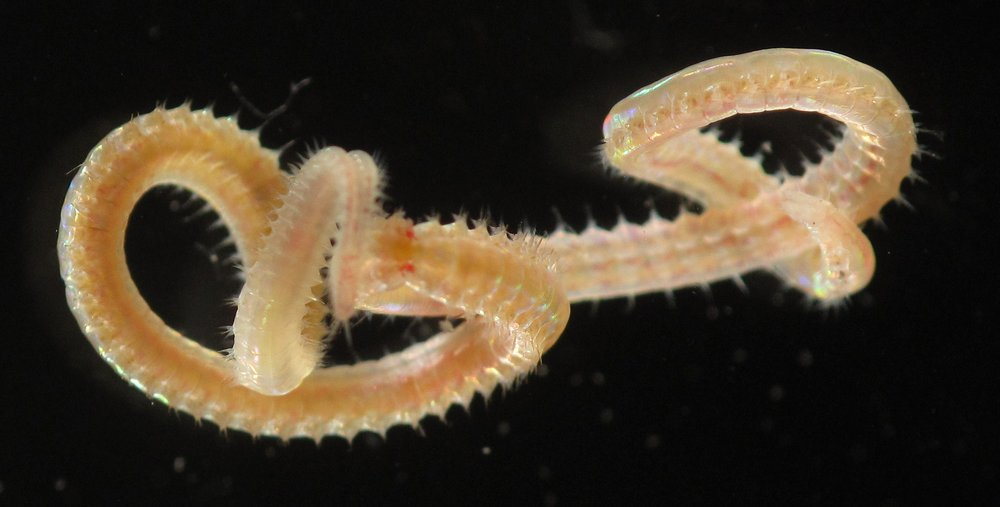
- A Synelmis Pilargid worm

Scientific classification
- Kingdom: Animalia
- Phylum: Annelida
- Clade: Pleistoannelida
- Subclass: Errantia
- Order: Phyllodocida
- Suborder: Nereidiformia
- Family: Pilargidae; Saint-Joseph, 1899

Genera
- Cabira; Glyphohesione; Hermundura; Otopsis; Ancistrosyllis; Harpochaeta; Pilargis; Sigambra; Pseudexogone; Sigatargis; Kynephorus; Litocorsa; Synelmis; Parandalia

= Pilargidae =

Family of annelids

Pilargidae is a family of polychaetes. These marine worms are cylindrical, somewhat flattened, and can be ribbon-like. They can be found free-living on sediment, or shallowly in sediment. Some species within the genera Hermundura and Litocorsa are known to burrow, having reduced heads and parapodia. Two species are known to be commensal with other polychaetes. Pilargis berkeleyae will live in the tubes of Chaetopteridae, and Ancistrosyllis commensalis will live in Capitellidae burrows. Pilargid worms are almost all exclusively predators, classified as carnivore omnivores. They are similar in appearance to Hesionidae, with a peristomium often with two pairs of tentacular cirri (with 1 pair or 0 in some species), reduced or absent notopodia, and a lack of pharyngeal jaws. The first few segments bearing setigers are also somewhat fused. They can have 0 to 3 antennae, and palps. These polychaetes are rarely the most abundant polychaete.

== Contested genera ==
Some genera have been redescribed under a new genus, which some consider junior synonyms of existing genera. Parandalia tricuspis is a redescription of Hermundura tricuspis, which provided more reliable characteristics for identification.
