= Hartmaniellidae =

Scientific classification
- Domain: Eukaryota
- Kingdom: Animalia
- Phylum: Annelida
- Clade: Pleistoannelida
- Subclass: Errantia
- Order: Eunicida
- Family: Hartmaniellidae

Family of annelids

Hartmaniellidae is a family of polychaetes belonging to the order Eunicida.

Genera:

- Hartmaniella Imajima, 1977
