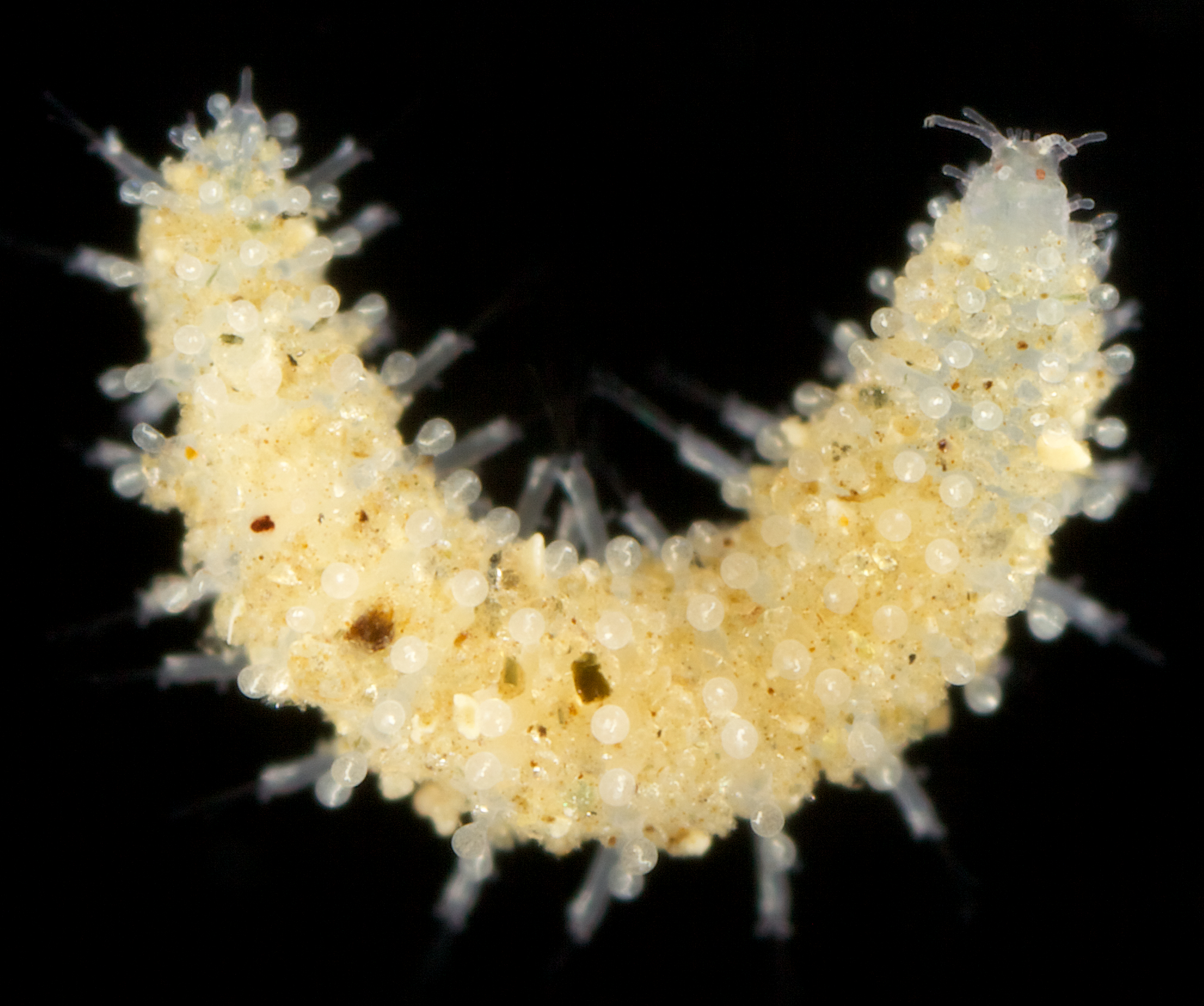

Scientific classification
- Domain: Eukaryota
- Kingdom: Animalia
- Phylum: Annelida
- Clade: Pleistoannelida
- Subclass: Errantia
- Order: Phyllodocida
- Family: Sphaerodoridae

= Sphaerodoridae =

Family of polychaetes

Sphaerodoridae is a family of polychaetes belonging to the order Phyllodocida.

== Genera ==
Genera:

- Amocrodorum Kudenov, 1987
- Clavodorum Hartman & Fauchald, 1971
- Commensodorum Fauchald, 1974
- Ephesiella Chamberlin, 1919
- Ephesiopsis Hartman & Fauchald, 1971
- Euritmia Sarda-Borroy, 1987
- Geminofilum Capa, Nygren, Parapar, Bakken, Meissner & Moreira, 2019
- Hypephesia Perrier, 1897
- Sphaerephesia Fauchald, 1972
- Sphaerodoridium Lützen, 1961
- Sphaerodoropsis Hartman & Fauchald, 1971
- Sphaerodorum Örsted, 1843
- Thysanoplea Schmidt, 1857
