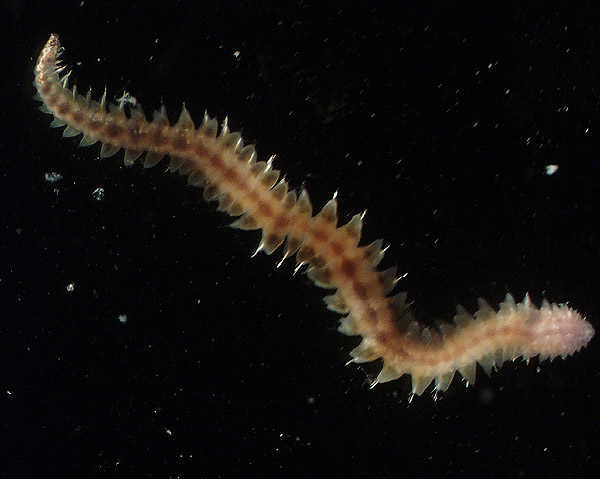

Scientific classification
- Domain: Eukaryota
- Kingdom: Animalia
- Phylum: Annelida
- Clade: Pleistoannelida
- Subclass: Errantia
- Order: Phyllodocida
- Family: Nautiliniellidae

Synonyms
- Nautilinidae

= Nautiliniellidae =

Family of polychaetes

Nautiliniellidae is a family of polychaetes belonging to the order Phyllodocida.

Genera:

- lascarpia
- Iheyomytilidicola
- Laubierus
