= Alciopidae =

Scientific classification
- Kingdom: Animalia
- Phylum: Annelida
- Clade: Pleistoannelida
- Subclass: Errantia
- Order: Phyllodocida
- Family: Alciopidae

Family of annelids

Alciopidae, also known as the camera eyed worms, is a family of polychaetes belonging to the order Phyllodocida. Alciopids are notable for representing the fourth phylum — besides arthropods, chordates, and mollusks — to have evolved high-resolution vision, namely vision that can distinguish objects from the visual background, enabling interaction with said objects. This has been demonstrated in particular in Vanadis cf. formosa, Torrea candida, and Naiades cantrainii.

Genera:

- Alciopa Audouin & Milne Edwards, 1833
- Alciopina Claparède & Panceri, 1867
- Krohnia Quatrefages, 1866
- Naiades Delle Chiaje, 1830
- Plotohelmis Chamberlin, 1919
- Pseudalciopa Støp-Bowitz, 1991
- Rhynchonereella Costa, 1864
- Torrea Quatrefages, 1850
- Vanadis Claparède, 1870
- Watelio Støp-Bowitz, 1948
