= Pontodoridae =

Scientific classification
- Domain: Eukaryota
- Kingdom: Animalia
- Phylum: Annelida
- Clade: Pleistoannelida
- Subclass: Errantia
- Order: Phyllodocida
- Family: Pontodoridae

Family of annelid worms

Pontodoridae is a family of polychaetes belonging to the order Phyllodocida.

Genera:

- Epitoka Treadwell, 1943
- Pontodora Greeff, 1879
