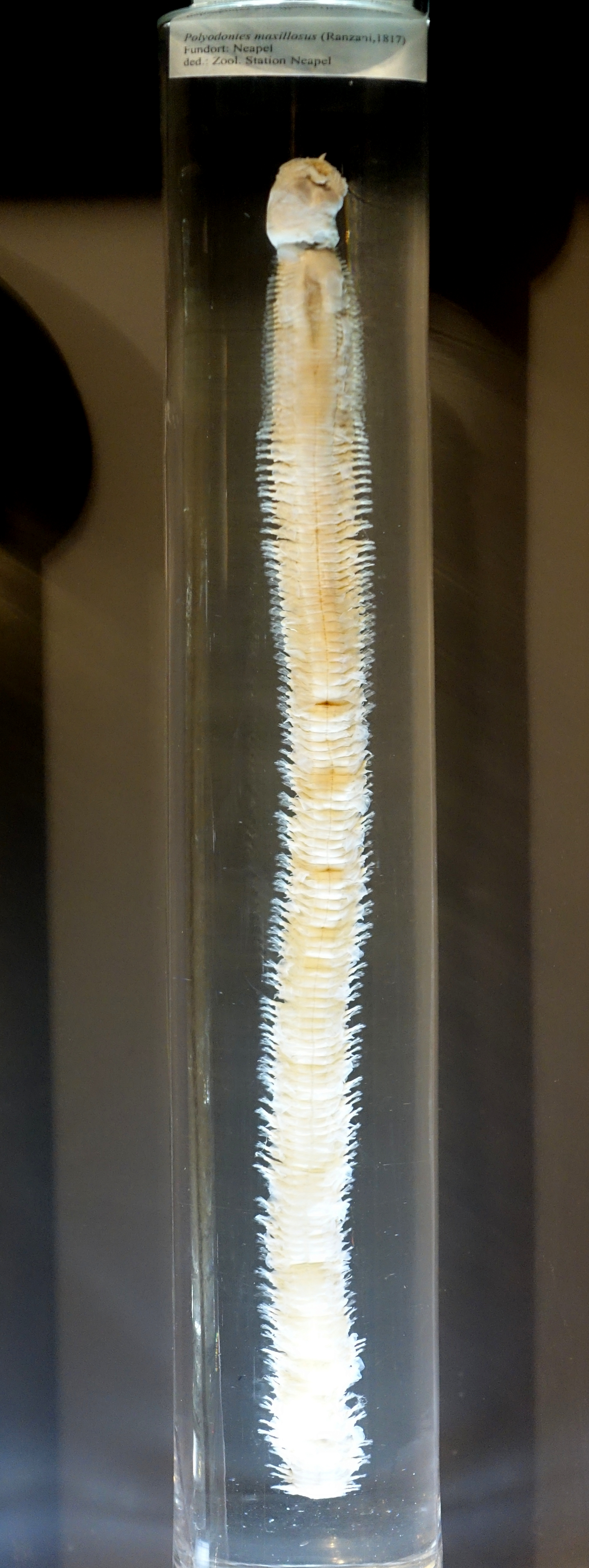
- Polyodontes maxillosus

Scientific classification
- Kingdom: Animalia
- Phylum: Annelida
- Clade: Pleistoannelida
- Subclass: Errantia
- Order: Phyllodocida
- Suborder: Aphroditiformia
- Family: Acoetidae; Kinberg, 1856

= Acoetidae =

Family of annelid worms

Acoetidae is a family of polychaete worms in the order Phyllodocida.

== Genera ==
- Acoetes Audouin & Milne Edwards, 1832
- Euarche Ehlers, 1887
- Eupanthalis McIntosh, 1876
- Eupolyodontes Buchanan, 1894
- Neopanthalis Strelzov, 1968
- Panthalis Kinberg, 1856
- Polyodontes Renieri in Blainville, 1828
- Zachsiella Buzhinskaja, 1982
