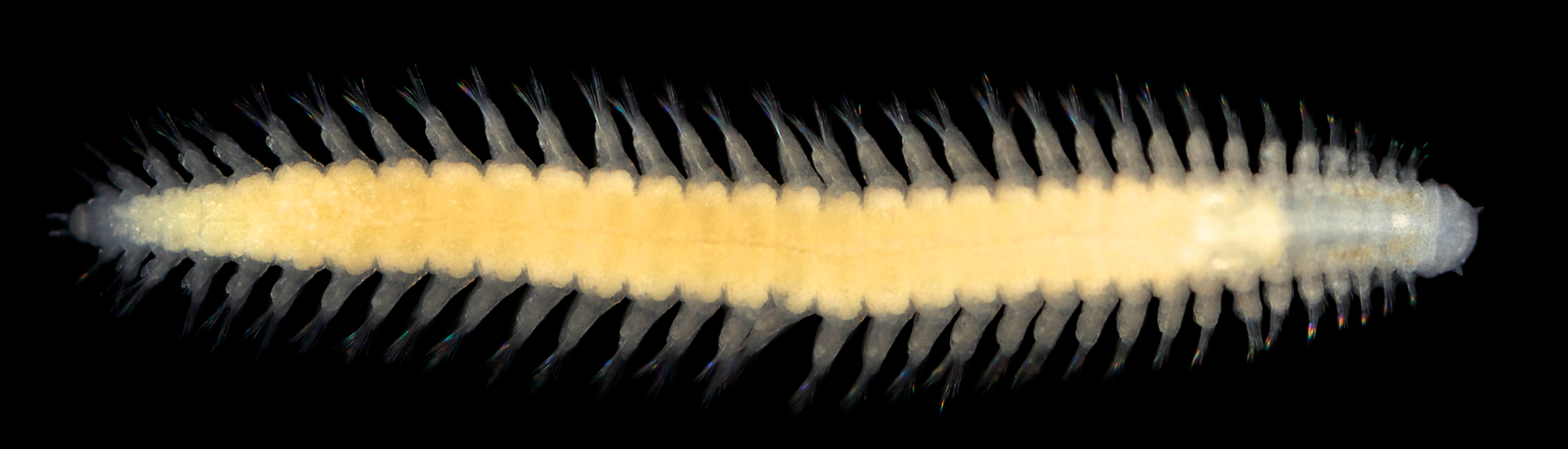
- Lacydonia eliasoni

Scientific classification
- Domain: Eukaryota
- Kingdom: Animalia
- Phylum: Annelida
- Clade: Pleistoannelida
- Subclass: Errantia
- Order: Phyllodocida
- Family: Lacydoniidae

= Lacydoniidae =

Family of polychaete worms

Lacydoniidae is a family of polychaetes belonging to the order Phyllodocida.

Genera:

- Lacydonia Marion, 1874
