= Goniadidae =

Scientific classification
- Kingdom: Animalia
- Phylum: Annelida
- Clade: Pleistoannelida
- Subclass: Errantia
- Order: Phyllodocida
- Suborder: Glyceriformia
- Family: Goniadidae; Kinberg, 1866

Family of annelid worms

Goniadidae is a family of marine worms within the Polychaeta. Goniadids have long, slender bodies and can grow up to 260mm in length, although most are less than 50mm long. Goniadids have an eversible proboscis with a circlet of chitinous jaws around the terminal end.

Goniadids are highly mobile, burrowing predators which inhabit soft sediments, including sand and mud. Goniadids tolerate a sediment mud content up to 60%, with an optimum range of 50-55%. They are usually distributed within the intertidal and subtidal zones, from shallow water to offshore continental shelf sediments.
