= Typhloscolecidae =

Scientific classification
- Domain: Eukaryota
- Kingdom: Animalia
- Phylum: Annelida
- Clade: Pleistoannelida
- Subclass: Errantia
- Order: Phyllodocida
- Family: Typhloscolecidae

Genera
- See below

Family of annelids

Typhloscolecidae is a family of polychaetes belonging to the order Phyllodocida.

Genera:

- Acicularia Langerhans, 1877
- Nuchubranchia Treadwell, 1928
- Plotobia Chamberlin, 1919
- Sagitella Wagner, 1872
- Travisiopsis Levinsen, 1885
- Typhloscolex Busch, 1851
