= Potamodrilus =

Scientific classification
- Domain: Eukaryota
- Kingdom: Animalia
- Phylum: Annelida
- Class: Polychaeta
- Order: incertae sedis
- Family: Potamodrilidae
- Genus: Potamodrilus; Lastochkin, 1935

Species
- Potamodrilus fluviatilus; Potamodrilus rivularis

Genus of annelid worms

Potamodrilidae is a family of meiofaunal annelids, monotypically containing only the genus Potamodrilus.

Potamodrialidae is the sister group to Aeolosomatidae, by all accounts. Beyond that, its phylogenetic position is uncertain.

The species of this genus are found in Europe.

Species:

- Potamodrilus fluviatilus (Lastockin, 1935)
- Potamodrilus rivularis Lastočkin, 1935
