= Sigalionidae =

Scientific classification
- Kingdom: Animalia
- Phylum: Annelida
- Clade: Pleistoannelida
- Subclass: Errantia
- Order: Phyllodocida
- Family: Sigalionidae; Kinberg, 1856

Synonyms
- Peisidicidae; Pholoididae

Family of polychaetes

Sigalionidae is a family of polychaetes belonging to the order Phyllodocida.

== Genera ==
Accepted genera and subfamilies according to WoRMS as of October 2023 are:

- Labioleanira Pettibone, 1992
- Labiosthenolepis Pettibone, 1992
- Leanira Kinberg, 1856
- Leanithalessa Hartmann-Schröder, 1965
- Mayella Hartmann-Schröder, 1959
- Mustaquimsthenelais Wehe, 2007
- Neoleanira Pettibone, 1970
- Pholoides Pruvot, 1895
- Sigalion Audouin & Milne Edwards, 1832
- Sthenelais Kinberg, 1856

Subfamily Pelogeniinae Chamberlin, 1919

- Claparedepelogenia Pettibone, 1997
- Dayipsammolyce Pettibone, 1997
- Hartmanipsammolyce Pettibone, 1997
- Heteropelogenia Pettibone, 1997
- Neopsammolyce Pettibone, 1997
- Pelogenia Schmarda, 1861
- Pottsipelogenia Pettibone, 1997
- Psammolyce Kinberg, 1856

Subfamily Pholoinae Kinberg, 1858 (synonym of unaccepted family Pholoidae Kinberg, 1858)

- Imajimapholoe Pettibone, 1992
- Laubierpholoe Pettibone, 1992
- Metaxypsamma Wolf, 1986
- Pholoe Johnston, 1839
- Taylorpholoe Pettibone, 1992

Subfamily Pisioninae Ehlers, 1901

- Anoplopisione Laubier, 1967
- Pisione Grube, 1857
- Pisionella Hartman, 1939
- Pisionidens Aiyar & Alikunhi, 1943

Subfamily Sigalioninae Kinberg, 1856

- Ehlersileanira Pettibone, 1970
- Euthalenessa Darboux, 1899
- Fimbriosthenelais Pettibone, 1971
- Horstileanira Pettibone, 1970

Subfamily Sthenelanellinae Gonzalez, Martínez, Borda, Iliffe, Eibye-Jacobsen & Worsaae, 2018

- Sthenelanella Moore, 1910
- Sthenolepis Willey, 1905
- Willeysthenelais Pettibone, 1971
