= Eulepethidae =

Scientific classification
- Domain: Eukaryota
- Kingdom: Animalia
- Phylum: Annelida
- Clade: Pleistoannelida
- Subclass: Errantia
- Order: Phyllodocida
- Family: Eulepethidae

Synonyms
- Eulepidae; Pareulepidae

Family of polychaetes

Eulepethidae is a family of polychaetes belonging to the order Phyllodocida.

Genera:

- Eulepethus Chamberlin, 1919
- Grubeulepis Pettibone, 1969
- Lamelleulepethus Pettibone, 1986
- Lammeleulepethus Pettibone, 1986
- Mexieulepis Rioja, 1962
- Pareulepis Darboux, 1900
- Proeulepethus Pettibone, 1986
