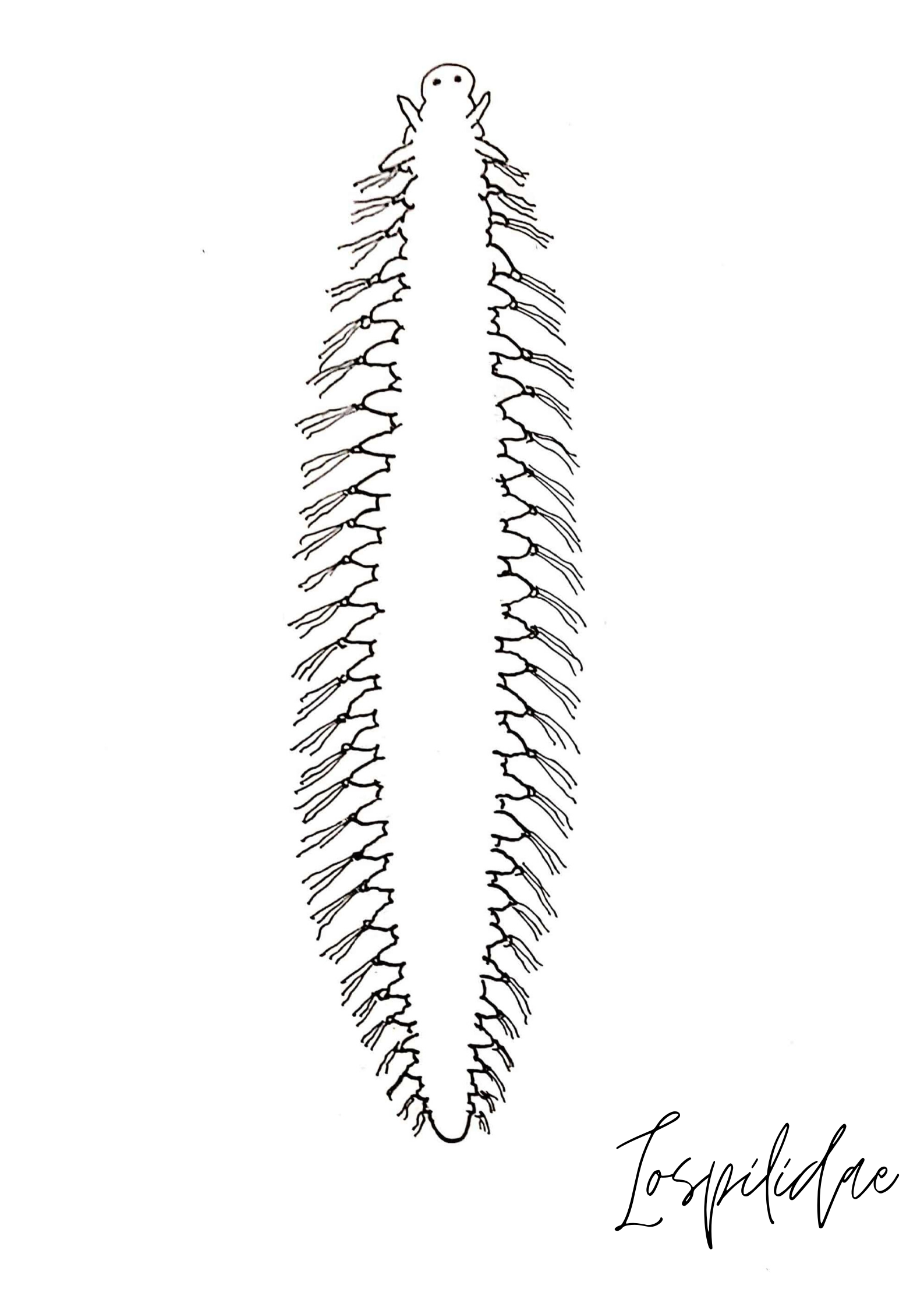
- Iospilidae

Scientific classification
- Kingdom: Animalia
- Phylum: Annelida
- Clade: Pleistoannelida
- Subclass: Errantia
- Order: Phyllodocida
- Family: Iospilidae

Synonyms
- Iopsilidae; Isopilidae

= Iospilidae =

Family of annelids

Iospilidae is a family of polychaetes belonging to the order Phyllodocida.

Genera:

- Iospilopsis Augener, 1922
- Iospilus Viguier, 1886
- Paraiospilus Viguier, 1911
- Phalacrophorus Greeff, 1879
