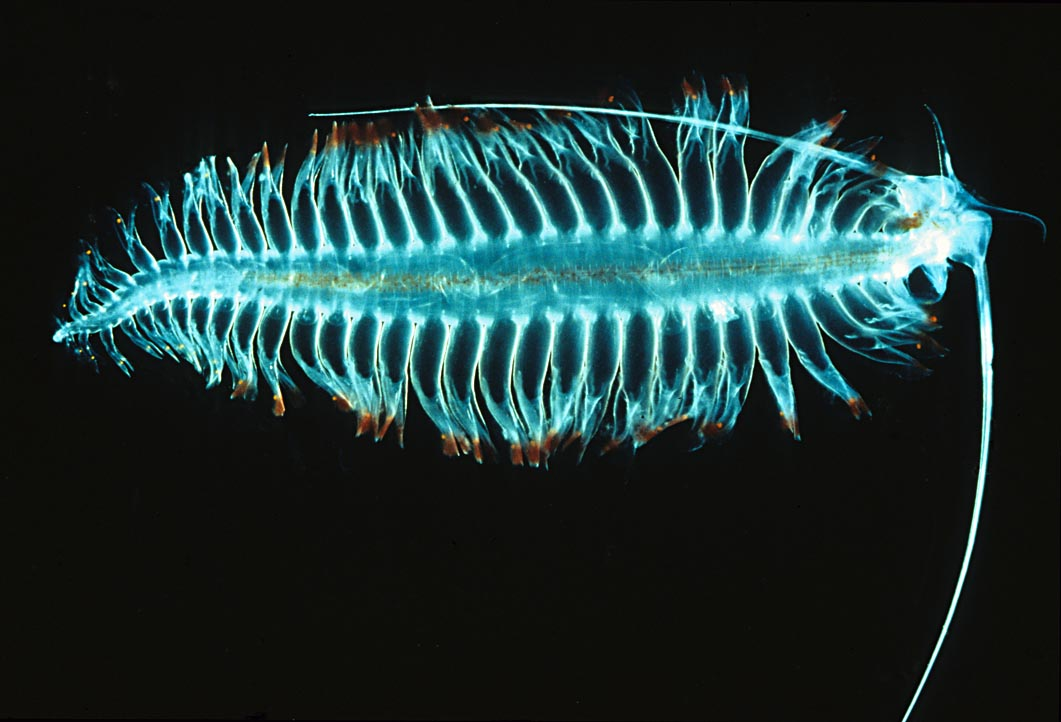
- Tomopteris kils

Scientific classification
- Kingdom: Animalia
- Phylum: Annelida
- Clade: Pleistoannelida
- Subclass: Errantia
- Clade: Aciculata
- Family: Tomopteridae

Genera
- Briaraea; Enapteris; Escholtzia; Tomopteris

= Tomopteridae =

Family of annelids

Tomopteridae is a family of holopelagic polychaetes belonging to the order Phyllodocida. The genus Tomopteris consist of about 70 species, and the three other genera of one known species each. Length varies from just 1-2 cm to 30 cm. These are very active swimmers, and have some of the highest metabolic rate among annelids. To increase buoyancy they have a large body cavity (coelom) filled with body fluid of a density similar to seawater. With the coelom taking up much of the inner space, the muscular system has been reduced to a mesh just below the epidermis. The circulatory system has been lost, and the coelomic fluid has taken over the role of transporting oxygen, nutrients and gametes. Instead of a heart the inner surface of the worm is covered with cilia that moves the fluid around inside the body. The absence of septa between the segments makes the circulation more efficient. A series of extretory organs called metanephridia consists of ciliated funnels which opens to the coleomic cavity and connects with the exterior though a nephridiopore. Some species are bioluminescent, and produce a yellow light.

Their sperm differ from other annelids in having two tails. Females produce gelatinous egg cases that floats in the water column.

The animals use a type of propulsion called metachronal paddling, a sequential movement of multiple appendages. It is also able to change the surface area of each parapodia by spreading and contracting its two fleshy ends, which creates differences in drag between power and recovery strokes.

Genera:

- Briaraea Quoy & Gaimard, 1827
- Enapteris Rosa, 1908
- Escholtzia Quatrefages, 1866
- Tomopteris Eschscholtz, 1825
