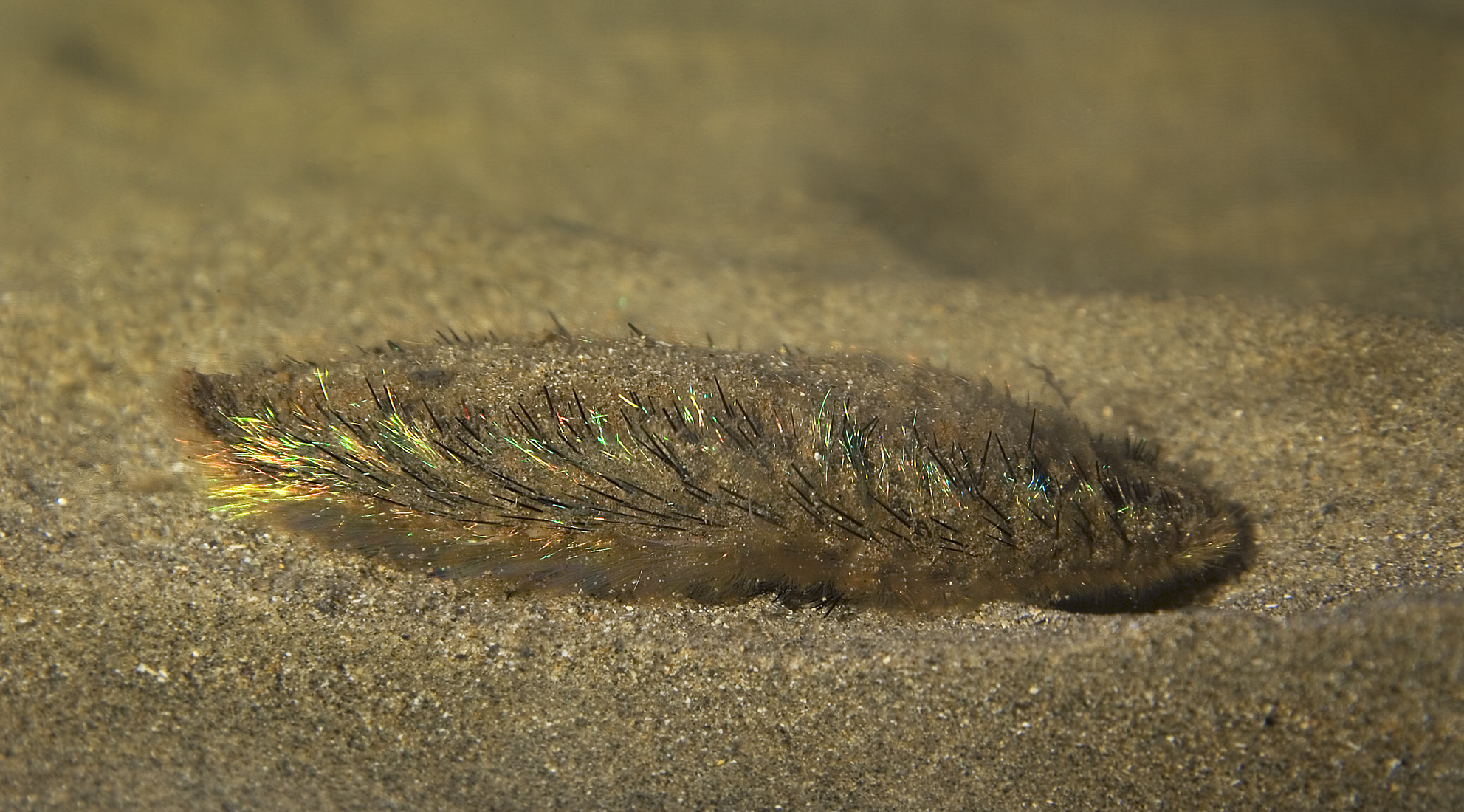
- Aphrodita aculeata

Scientific classification
- Kingdom: Animalia
- Phylum: Annelida
- Clade: Pleistoannelida
- Subclass: Errantia
- Order: Phyllodocida
- Suborder: Aphroditiformia
- Family: Aphroditidae; Malmgren, 1867

= Aphroditidae =

Family of marine worms

Aphroditidae is a family of annelids belonging to the order Phyllodocida.

== Genera ==
Genera:

- Aphrodita Linnaeus, 1758
- Aphrogenia Kinberg, 1856
- Cyanippa Lucas, 1840
- Halogenia Horst, 1916
- Hermione Blainville,1828
- Hermionopsis Seidler, 1923
- Hermonia Hartman, 1959
- Heteraphrodita Pettibone, 1966
- Homaphrodite Gall & Grauvogel, 1966
- Laetmonice Kinberg, 1856
- Palaeoaphrodite Alessandrelli & Teruzzi, 1986
- Palmyra Savigny, 1818
- Pholoicola
- Pontogenia Claparède, 1868
