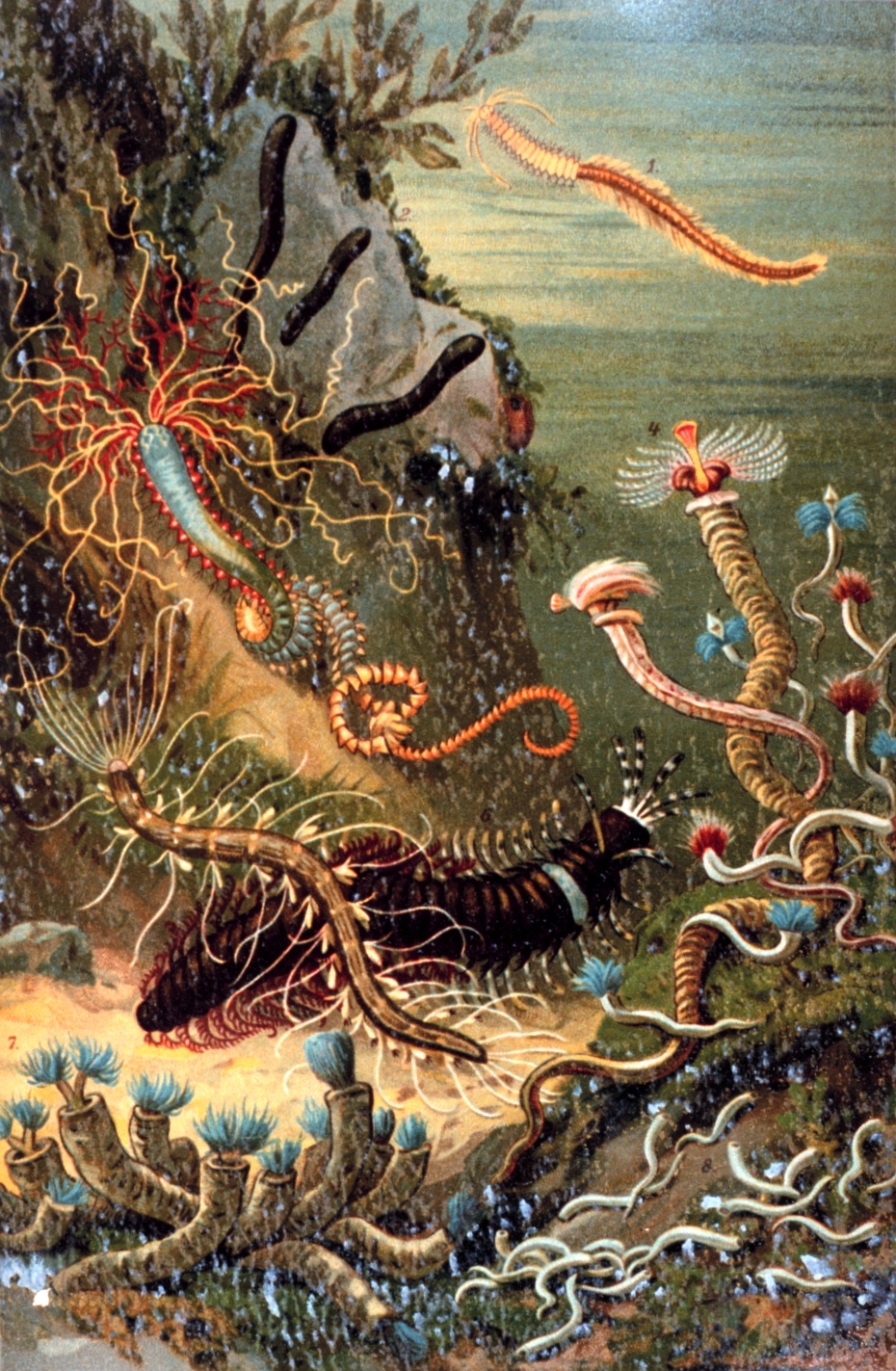
- Plate titled "A variety of marine worms" from M. J. Schleiden's Das Meer

Scientific classification
- Kingdom: Animalia
- Phylum: Annelida
- Class: Polychaeta; Grube, 1850

Groups included
- Palaeoannelida; Chaetopteridae; Amphinomida; Errantia; Myzostomida; Sedentaria (without Clitellata)

Cladistically included but traditionally excluded taxa
- Sipuncula; Clitellata

= Polychaete =

Polychaetes Temporal range: Cambrian (or earlier?) – present

Class of annelid worms

Polychaeta (/ˌpɒlɪˈkiːtə/) is a paraphyletic class of generally marine annelid worms, commonly called bristle worms or polychaetes (/ˈpɒlɪˌkiːts/). Each body segment has a pair of fleshy protrusions called parapodia which bear many chitinous bristles called chaetae, hence their name.

More than 10,000 species have been described in this diverse and widespread class; in addition to inhabiting all of the world's oceans, polychaetes occur at all ocean depths, from planktonic species living near the surface, to a small undescribed species observed through a ROV at the deepest region in the Earth's oceans, Challenger Deep. In addition, many species live on the abyssal plains, coral reefs, parasitically, and a few within fresh water.

Commonly encountered representatives include the lugworms, bloodworms, and species of Alitta such as the clam worm and sandworm or ragworm; these species inhabit shallow water marine environments and coastlines of subtropical and temperate regions around the world and may be used as fishing bait. More exotic species include the stinging fireworms, the predatory and large-bodied bobbit worm, the culturally important palolo worm, the bone-eating worms, and giant tube worms, which are extremophiles that tolerate near-boiling water near hydrothermal vents.

== Description ==
Polychaetes are segmented worms, generally less than 10 cm (4 in) in length, although ranging at the extremes from 1 mm (0.04 in) to 3 m (10 ft), in Eunice aphroditois. They can sometimes be brightly coloured, and may be iridescent or even luminescent. Each segment bears a pair of paddle-like and highly vascularized parapodia, which are used for movement and, in many species, act as the worm's primary respiratory surfaces. Bundles of bristles, the chaetae, project from the parapodia.

However, polychaete body plans vary widely from this generalized pattern, and can display a range of different body forms. The most generalised polychaetes are those that crawl along the bottom, but others have adapted to many different ecological niches, including burrowing, pelagic swimming, dwelling in self-created tubes or ones bored out of a substrate, commensalism, and parasitism; such varied lifestyles requires a divergence from the basic body plan of the common ancestor.

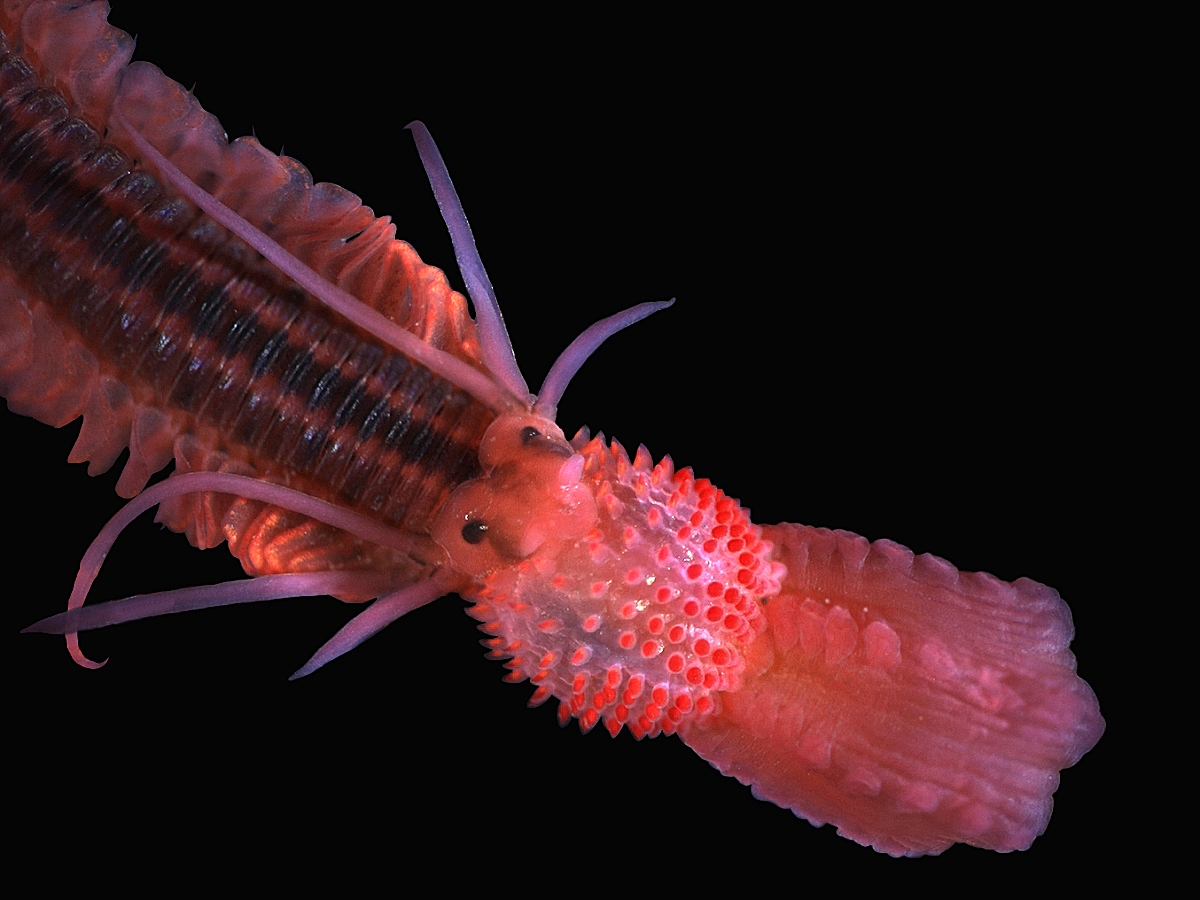
Pharynx eversion in Phyllodoce lineata

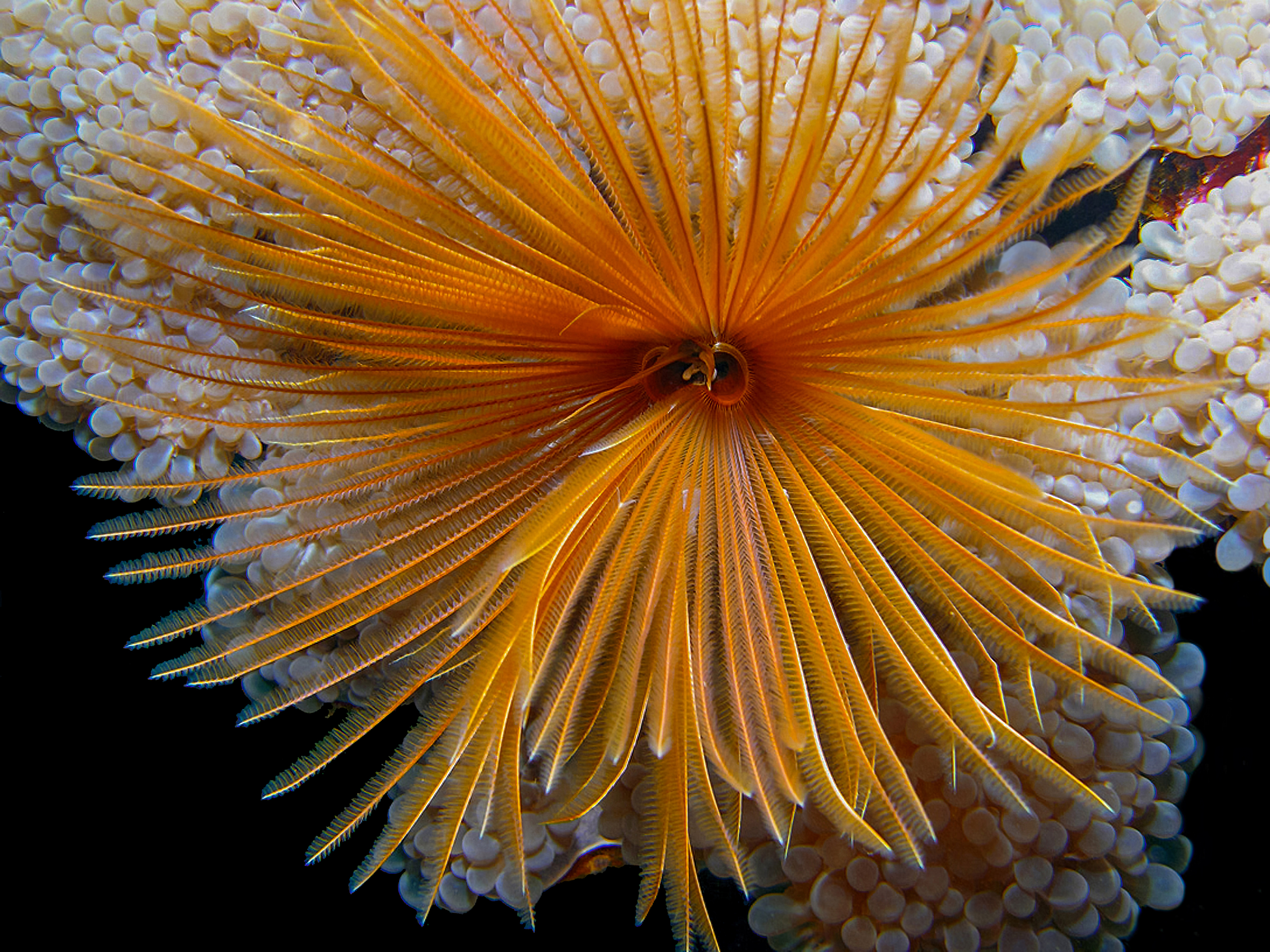
The plumes of a feather duster worm are known as radioles

The head, or prostomium, is relatively well developed, compared with other annelids. It projects forward over the mouth, which is located on the succeeding section; the peristomium. The mouthparts vary in form depending on their diets, since the group includes predators, herbivores, filter feeders, scavengers, and parasites. In general, however, they possess a pair of jaws and a pharynx that can be rapidly everted, allowing the worms to grab food and pull it into their mouths. In some species, the pharynx is modified into a lengthy proboscis. Their jaws are formed from sclerotised collagen. The digestive tract is a simple tube, usually with a stomach partway along.

The head may include two to four pairs of eyes, although some species are eyeless. The eyes are typically fairly simple structures, capable of distinguishing only light and dark, although some species have large eyes with lenses that may be capable of more sophisticated vision, an example being the complex eyes of Alciopidae, which rival those of cephalopods and vertebrates. The head also includes a pair of antennae, tentacle-like palps, and a pair of pits lined with cilia known as nuchal organs, which are chemoreceptors that help the worm to seek out food.

Polychaete cross section

The outer surface of the body wall consists of a simple columnar epithelium covered by a thin cuticle, constructed from cross-linked collagen fibers and may be 2 to 13 millimetres (0.079 to 0.512 in) thick. Sclerotized collagen makes up their setae.

The papillae of polychaetes are tiny, fleshy projections on the worm's body or parapodia, often associated with sensory and locomotive functions. Some papillae have sensory receptors to help the worm detect environmental changes, such as touch, water currents, or chemical signals, and support movement by working with parapodia to aid grip and friction during crawling or burrowing. Other papilla types play a protective role, specifically in the secretion of mucus used to deter predators.

Underneath the cuticle, in order, are a thin layer of connective tissue, a layer of circular muscle, a layer of longitudinal muscle, and a peritoneum surrounding the coelom (body cavity). Additional oblique muscles move the parapodia. In most species, the body cavity is divided into separate compartments by sheets of peritoneum between each segment, but in some species it is more continuous.

=== Physiology ===
A simple but well-developed circulatory system is usually present. The two main blood vessels furnish smaller vessels to supply the parapodia and the gut. Blood flows forward in the dorsal vessel, above the gut, and returns down the body in the ventral vessel, beneath the gut. The blood vessels themselves are contractile, helping to push the blood along, so most species have no need of a heart. In a few cases, however, muscular pumps analogous to a heart are found in various parts of the system. Conversely, some species have little or no circulatory system at all, transporting oxygen in the coelomic fluid that fills their body cavities. The blood may be colourless, or have any of three different respiratory pigments. The most common of these is hemoglobin, but some groups have haemerythrin or the green-coloured chlorocruorin, instead.

The smallest species, and those adapted to burrowing, lack gills, breathing only through their body surfaces (by diffusion). Most other species have external gills, often associated with the parapodia.

The nervous system consists of a single or double ventral nerve cord running the length of the body, with ganglia and a series of small nerves in each segment. The brain is relatively large, compared with that of other annelids, and lies in the upper part of the head. An endocrine gland is attached to the ventral posterior surface of the brain, and appears to be involved in reproductive activity. In addition to the sensory organs on the head, photosensitive eye spots, statocysts, and numerous additional sensory nerve endings, most likely involved with the sense of touch, also occur on the body.

Polychaetes have a varying number of protonephridia or metanephridia for excreting waste, which in some cases can be relatively complex in structure. The body also contains greenish "chloragogen" tissue, similar to that found in oligochaetes, which appears to function in metabolism, in a similar fashion to that of the vertebrate liver.

Many species exhibit bioluminescence; eight families have luminous species.

== Ecology ==
Polychaetes are extremely variable in both form and lifestyle, and include a few taxa that swim among the plankton or above the abyssal plain. Most burrow or build tubes in the sediment, and some live as commensals. A few species, roughly 80 (less than 0.5% of species), are parasitic. They are predominantly marine, but 168 species (nearly 2% of total species) also live in freshwater, and a few in semiterrestrial environments and even in caves. The mobile forms (Errantia) tend to have well-developed sense organs and jaws, while the stationary forms (Sedentaria) lack them, but may have specialized gills or tentacles used for respiration and deposit or filter feeding, e.g., fanworms. Polychaete mouthparts are reversible and used to capture prey.

The parasitic forms include both ectoparasites and endoparasites. Ectoparasitic polychaetes feed on skin, blood, and other secretions, and some are adapted to bore through hard, usually calcerous surfaces, such as the shells of mollusks. These "boring" polychaetes may be parasitic, but may be opportunistic or even obligate symbionts (commensals).

- The Pompeii worm (Alvinella pompejana) is endemic to the hydrothermal vents of the Pacific Ocean. Pompeii worms are among the most heat-tolerant complex animals known.
- Osedax, such as the "bone-eating snot flower", is a decomposer that infests the surface of marine vertebrate bones, such as whales.
- Hesiocaeca methanicola lives on methane clathrate deposits.
- Lamellibrachia luymesi is a cold seep tube worm that reaches lengths of over 3 m (9.8 ft) and may be the most long-lived annelid, being able to live to over 250 years old.
- A still unclassified predatory polychaete worm around 1 in (2.5 cm)-long was observed from the ROV Nereus at the bottom Challenger Deep, the greatest depth in the oceans, near 10,902 m (35,768 ft) in depth. The probe failed to capture it, so it could not be studied in detail.
- The Bobbit worm (Eunice aphroditois) is a predatory species that can achieve a length of 3 m (10 ft), with an average diameter of 25 mm (1 in).
- Dimorphilus gyrociliatus has the smallest known genome of any annelid. The species shows extreme sexual dimorphism; females measure ~1 mm long and have simplified bodies containing six segments, a reduced coelom, and no appendages, parapodia, or chaetae. The males are only 50 μm long and consist of just a few hundred cells; with just 68 neurons and no digestive system, they live around just a week before dying.
- The Namanereidinae may inhabit semi-terrestrial environments, though they are restricted to humid areas with associated plant matter. Some have even adapted to live in caves, becoming stygofaunas.
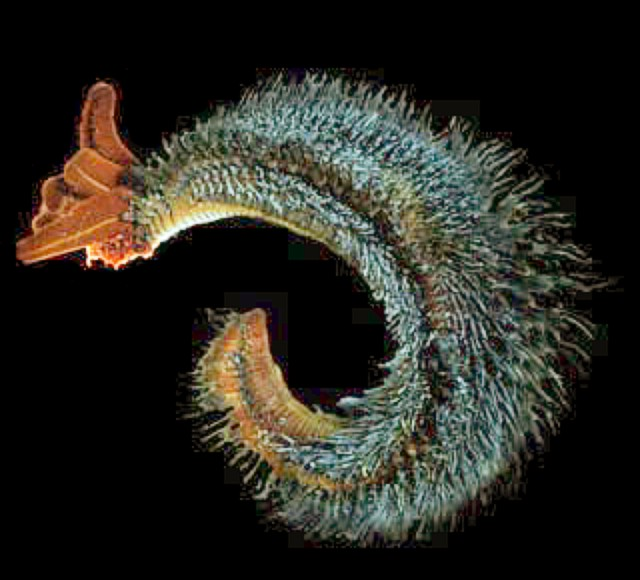
The Pompeii worm lives at great depths by hydrothermal vents at temperatures up to 80 °C (176 °F).

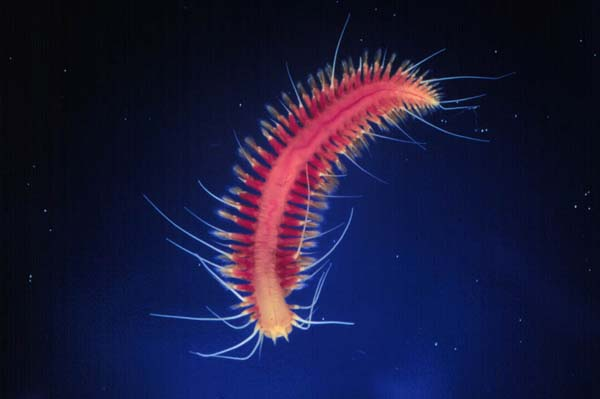
Hesiocaeca methanicola lives at great depths on methane ice

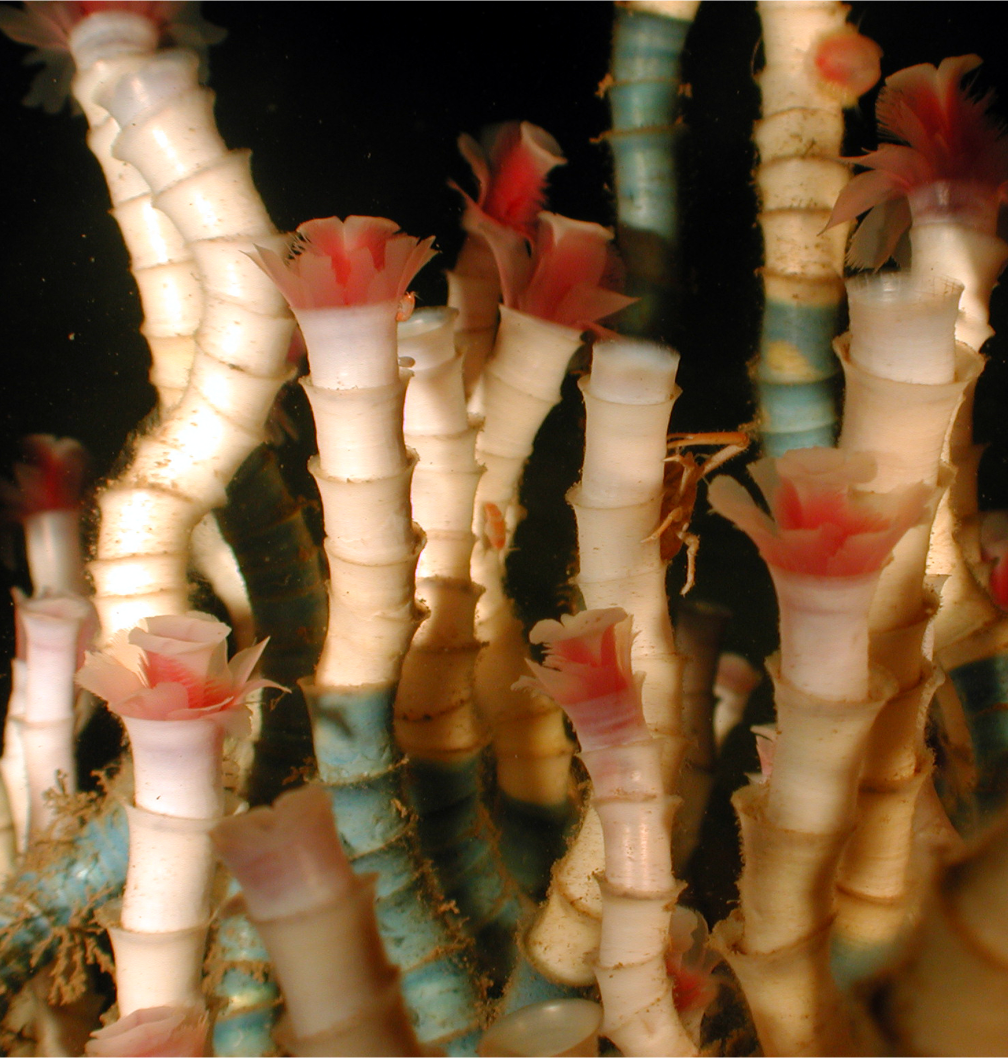
The cold seep tube worm Lamellibrachia can live over 250 years

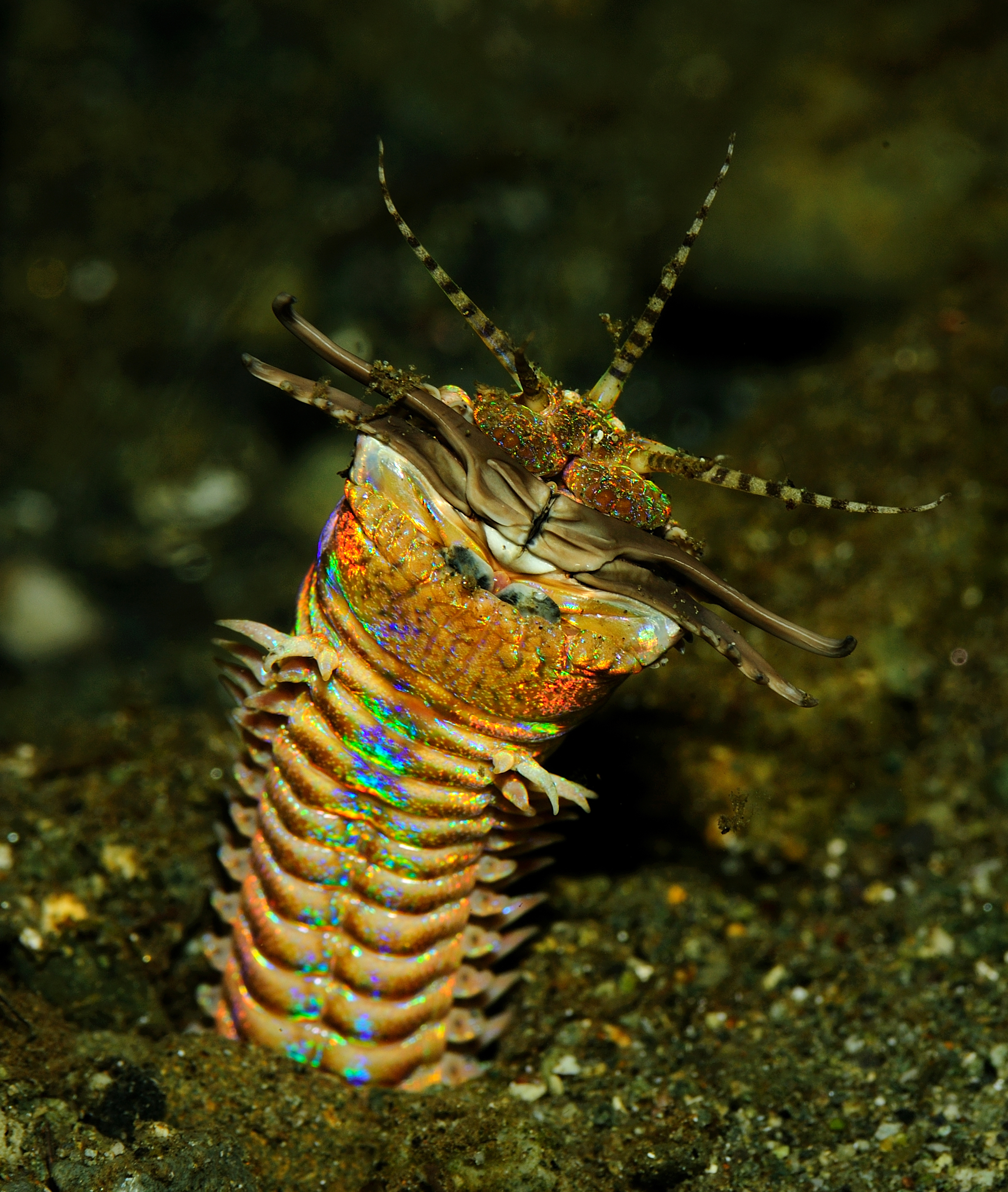
The predatory bobbit worm

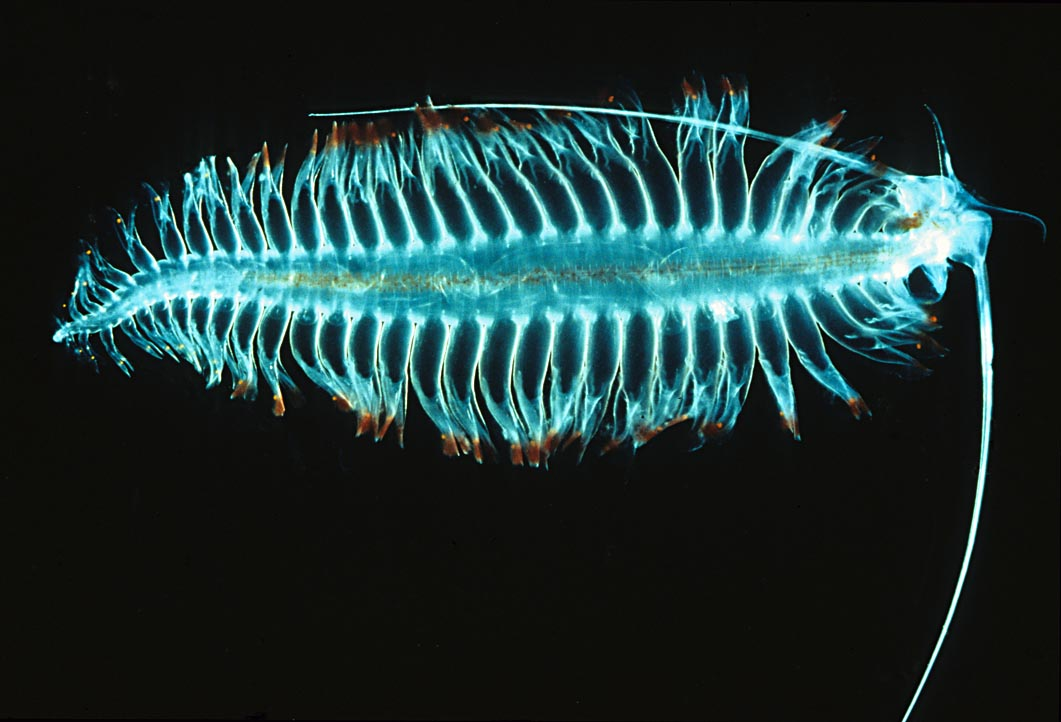
Pelagic gossamer worm

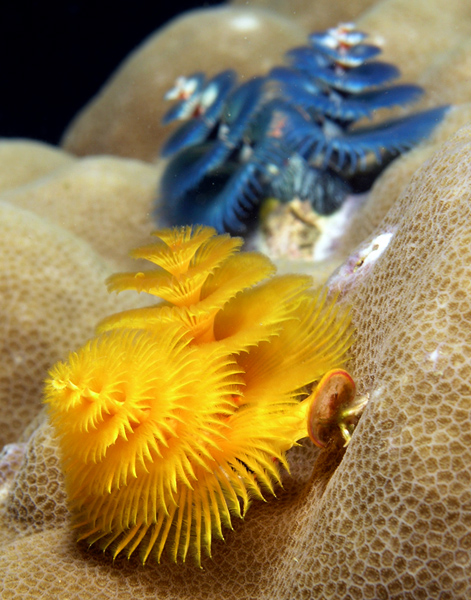
Christmas tree worms bore into living coral

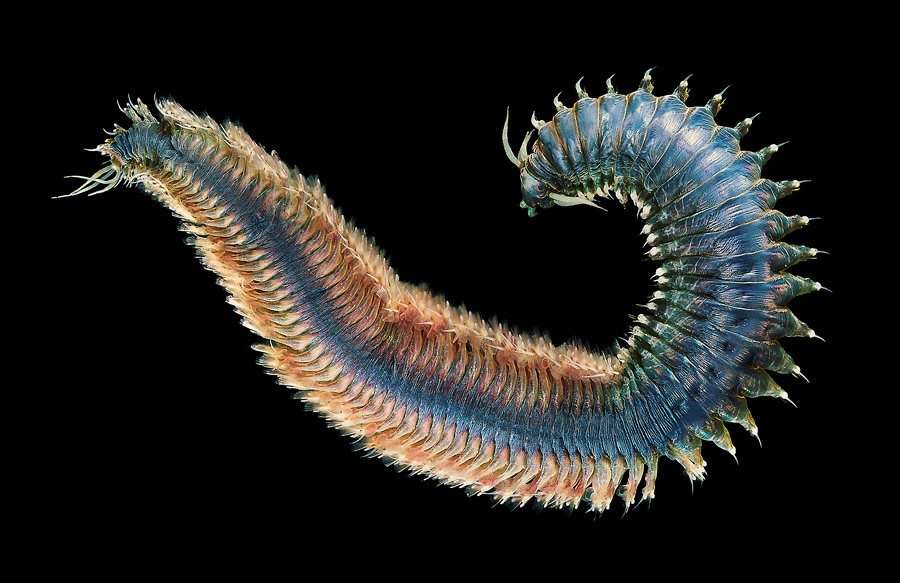
Rag worms are used as fishing bait

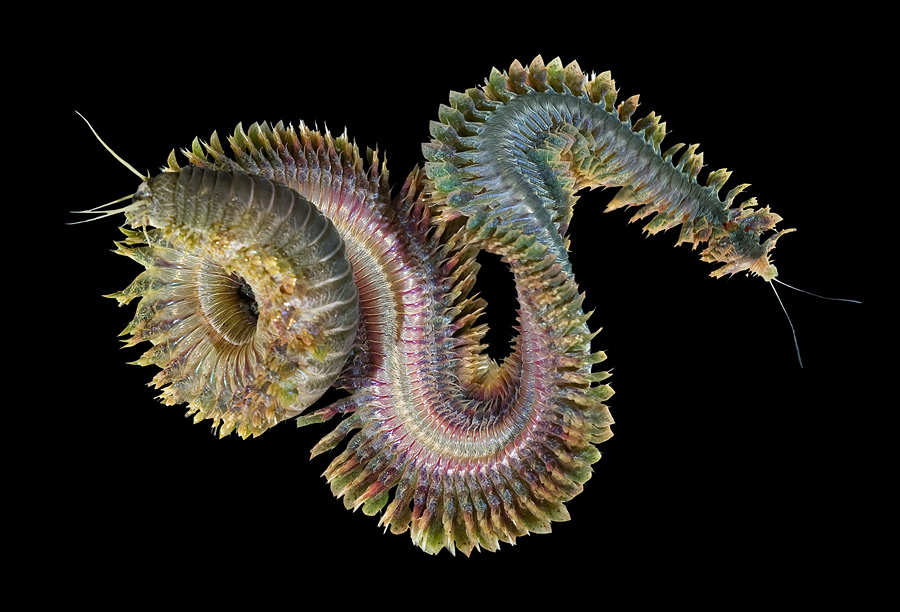
Sandworms eat seaweed and microorganisms and can be over 4 feet (1.2 m) long

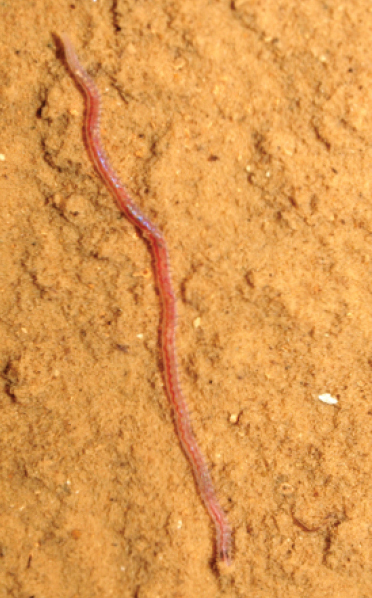
Namanereis canariarum is one of the multiple polychaete species which inhabit caves

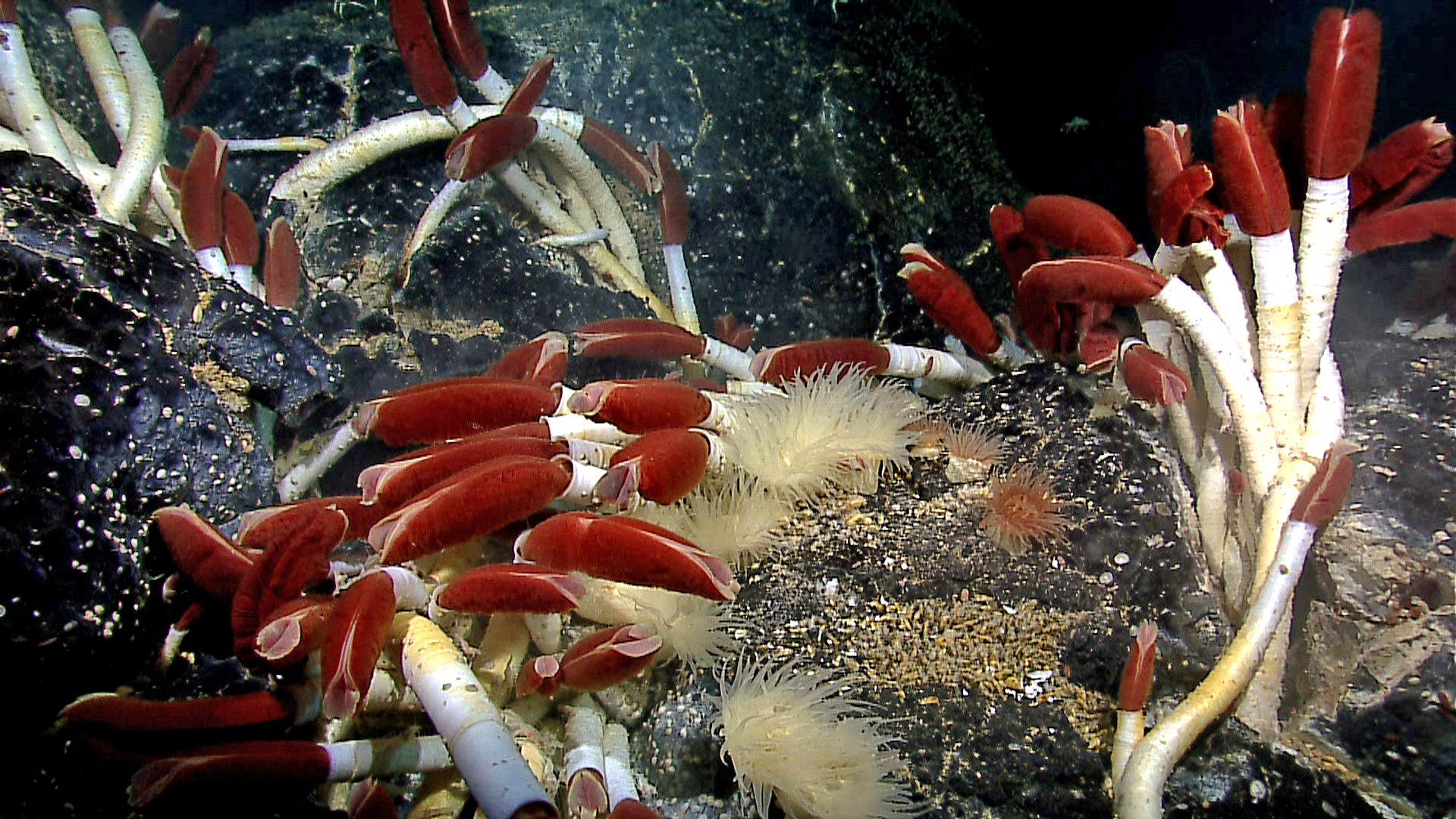
Giant tube worms are another hydrothermal vent specialist

== Reproduction ==
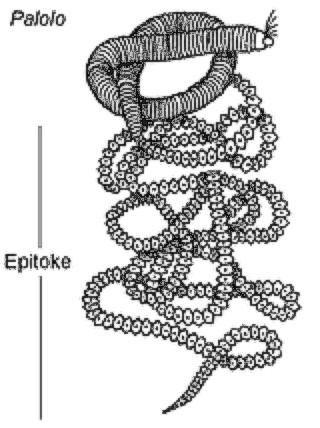
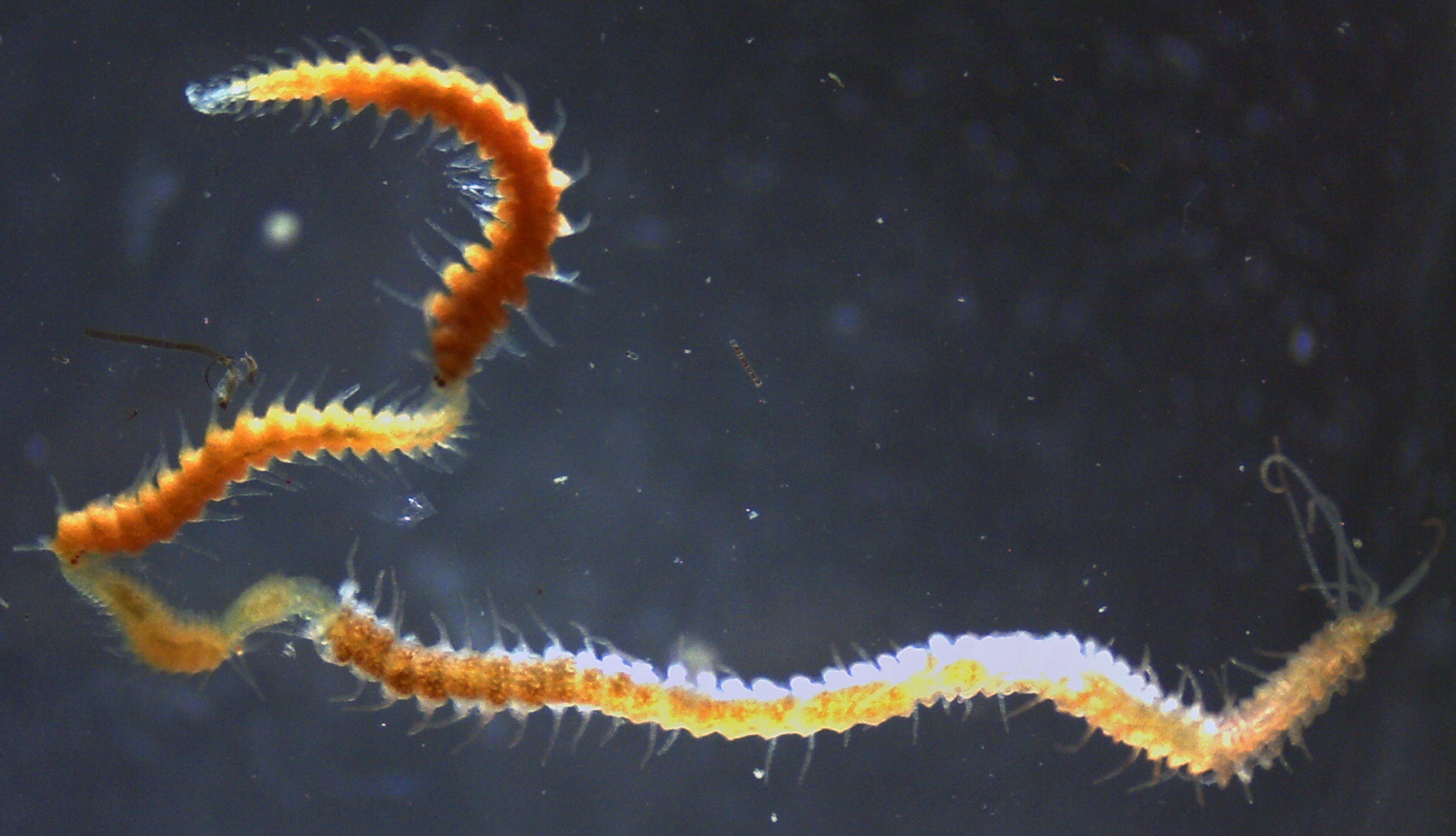
Two examples of epitoky in progress;

Top: Palola viridis (Eunicida)

Bottom: Syllidae sp. (Phyllodocida)

Most polychaetes have separate sexes, rather than being hermaphroditic. The most primitive species have a pair of gonads in every segment, but most species exhibit some degree of specialisation. The gonads shed immature gametes directly into the body cavity, where they complete their development. Once mature, the gametes are shed into the surrounding water through ducts or openings that vary between species, or in some cases by the complete rupture of the body wall (and subsequent death of the adult). A few species copulate, but most fertilize their eggs externally.

The fertilized eggs typically hatch into trochophore larvae, which float among the plankton, and eventually metamorphose into the adult form by adding segments. A few species have no larval form, with the egg hatching into a form resembling the adult, and in many that do have larvae, the trochophore never feeds, surviving off the yolk that remains from the egg.

However, some polychaetes exhibit remarkable reproductive strategies. Some species reproduce by epitoky. For much of the year, these worms look like any other burrow-dwelling polychaete, but as the breeding season approaches, the worm undergoes a remarkable transformation as new, specialized segments begin to grow from its rear end until the worm can be clearly divided into two halves. The front half, the atoke, is asexual. The new rear half, responsible for breeding, is known as the epitoke. Each of the epitoke segments is packed with eggs and sperm and features a single eyespot on its surface. The beginning of the last lunar quarter is the cue for these animals to breed, and the epitokes break free from the atokes and float to the surface. The eye spots sense when the epitoke reaches the surface and the segments from millions of worms burst, releasing their eggs and sperm into the water.

A similar strategy is employed by the branching deep sea worm Syllis ramosa, which lives inside a sponge; the worm develop "stolons" containing eggs or sperm from one of their many rear ends; these stolons detach from the parent worm and rise to the sea surface, where fertilisation takes place.

== Evolution ==
Stem-group polychaete fossils are known from the Sirius Passet Lagerstätte, a rich, sedimentary deposit in Greenland tentatively dated to the late Atdabanian (early Cambrian). The oldest known polychaete as of 2025 is Dannychaeta tucolus, dated to approximately 514 million years ago. Many of the more famous Burgess Shale organisms, such as Canadia, may also have polychaete affinities. Wiwaxia, long interpreted as an annelid, is now considered to represent a mollusc. An even older fossil, Cloudina, dates to the terminal Ediacaran period; this has been interpreted as an early polychaete, although consensus is absent.

Being soft-bodied organisms, the fossil record of polychaetes is dominated by their fossilized jaws, known as scolecodonts, and the mineralized tubes that some of them secrete. Most important biomineralising polychaetes are serpulids, sabellids, and cirratulids. Polychaete cuticle does have some preservation potential; it tends to survive for at least 30 days after a polychaete's death. Although biomineralisation is usually necessary to preserve soft tissue after this time, the presence of polychaete muscle in the nonmineralised Burgess shale shows this need not always be the case. Their preservation potential is similar to that of jellyfish.

=== Taxonomy and systematics ===
Taxonomically, polychaetes are thought to be paraphyletic, meaning the group excludes some descendants of its most recent common ancestor. Groups that may be descended from the polychaetes include the clitellates (earthworms and leeches), sipunculans, and echiurans. The Pogonophora and Vestimentifera were once considered separate phyla, but are now classified in the polychaete family Siboglinidae.

Much of the classification below matches Rouse & Fauchald, 1998, although that paper does not apply ranks above family.

Older classifications recognize many more (sub)orders than the layout presented here. As comparatively few polychaete taxa have been subject to cladistic analysis, some groups which are usually considered invalid today may eventually be reinstated.

These divisions were shown to be mostly paraphyletic in recent years.

- Basal or incertae sedis
  - Family Diurodrilidae
  - Family Histriobdellidae
  - Family Nerillidae
  - Family Parergodrilidae
  - Family Potamodrilidae
  - Family Psammodrilidae
  - Family Spintheridae
  - Family Protodriloididae
  - Family Saccocirridae
  - Order Haplodrili
  - Order Myzostomida
    - Family Endomyzostomatidae
    - Family Asteromyzostomatidae
    - Family Myzostomatidae
- Subclass Palpata
  - Family Protodrilidae
  - Family Polygordiidae
- Subclass Echiura
  - Order Bonelliida
    - Family Bonelliidae
    - Family Ikedidae
  - Order Echiurida
    - Family Echiuridae
    - Family Thalassematidae
    - Family Urechidae
- Subclass Aciculata
  - Family Levidoridae
  - Order Amphinomida
    - Family Amphinomidae
    - Family Euphrosinidae
  - Order Eunicida
    - Family Dorvilleidae
    - Family Eunicidae
    - Family Hartmaniellidae
    - Family Ichthyotomidae
    - Family Lumbrineridae
    - Family Oenonidae
    - Family Onuphidae
  - Order Phyllodocida
    - Suborder Aphroditiformia
      - Family Acoetidae
      - Family Aphroditidae
      - Family Eulepethidae
      - Family Iphionidae
      - Family Pholoidae
      - Family Polynoidae
      - Family Sigalionidae
    - Suborder Glyceriformia
      - Family Glyceridae
      - Family Goniadidae
      - Family Lacydoniidae
      - Family Paralacydoniidae
    - Suborder Nereidiformia
      - Family Antonbruunidae
      - Family Chrysopetalidae
      - Family Hesionidae
      - Family Nereididae
      - Family Pilargidae
      - Family Syllidae
    - Suborder Phyllodocida incertae sedis
      - Family Iospilidae
      - Family Nautiliniellidae
      - Family Nephtyidae
      - Family Typhloscolecidae
      - Family Tomopteridae
    - Suborder Phyllodociformia
      - Family Alciopidae
      - Family Lopadorrhynchidae
      - Family Phyllodocidae
      - Family Pontodoridae
- Subclass Sedentaria
  - Family Chaetopteridae
  - Infraclass Canalipalpata
    - Order Sabellida
      - Family Caobangidae
      - Family Fabriciidae
      - Family Oweniidae
      - Family Sabellariidae
      - Family Sabellidae
      - Family Serpulidae
      - Family Siboglinidae
    - Order Spionida
      - Suborder Spioniformia
        - Family Apistobranchidae
        - Family Longosomatidae
        - Family Magelonidae
        - Family Poecilochaetidae
        - Family Spionidae
        - Family Trochochaetidae
        - Family Uncispionidae
    - Order Terebellida
      - Suborder Cirratuliformia
        - Family Acrocirridae
        - Family Cirratulidae
        - Family Ctenodrilidae
        - Family Fauveliopsidae
        - Family Flabelligeridae
        - Family Flotidae
        - Family Poeobiidae
        - Family Sternaspidae
      - Suborder Terebellomorpha
        - Family Alvinellidae
        - Family Ampharetidae
        - Family Pectinariidae
        - Family Terebellidae
        - Family Trichobranchidae
  - Infraclass Scolecida
    - Family Arenicolidae
    - Family Capitellidae
    - Family Cossuridae
    - Family Maldanidae
    - Family Opheliidae
    - Family Orbiniidae
    - Family Paraonidae
    - Family Scalibregmatidae
    - Order Capitellida (nomen dubium)
    - Order Cossurida (nomen dubium)
    - Order Opheliida (nomen dubium)
    - Order Orbiniida (nomen dubium)
    - Order Questida (nomen dubium)
    - Order Scolecidaformia (nomen dubium)

Below is a phylogenetic tree of annelids from a 2021 review of annelid diversity (clades labeled × are not considered polychaetes);

- Annelida
  - Palaeoannelida
  - - Chaetopteridae
    - - - Amphinomida
        - Sipuncula ×
      - - - Eunicida
          - Phyllodocida
        - - - Siboglinidae
            - - Cirratuliformia
              - Orbiniida
          - - - Sabellida
              - - Sabellariidae
                - Spionida
            - - - Opheliida
                - Scalibregmatidae + Travisia
                - Capitellida
              - - Clitellata ×
                - - Terebelliformia
                  - Arenicolida

== See also ==
- Aeolosoma
- Edith Berkeley
