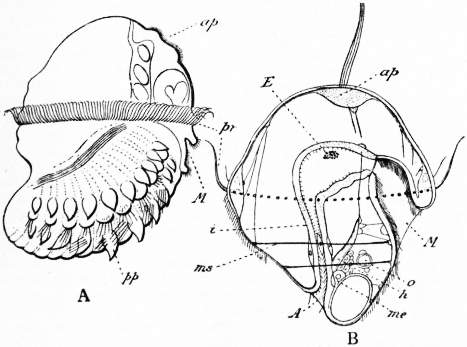
- A, Side view of the larva of Lopadorhynchus (from Kleinenberg), showing the developing trunk region. in Encyclopædia Britannica 1911 - Chaetopoda article - Anonymous author.

Scientific classification
- Kingdom: Animalia
- Phylum: Annelida
- Clade: Pleistoannelida
- Subclass: Errantia
- Order: Phyllodocida
- Suborder: Phyllodociformia
- Family: Lopadorrhynchidae; Claparède, 1870

Genera
- Hydrophanes Claparède, 1870; Lopadorrhynchus Grube, 1855; Mastigethus Chamberlin, 1919; Maupasia Viguier, 1886; Nans Chamberlin, 1919; Pedinosoma Reibisch, 1895; Pelagobia Greeff, 1879

Synonyms
- Lopadorhynchidae (misspelling); Lopadorrhynchinae Claparède, 1870 (rank upgrade to family status)

= Lopadorrhynchidae =

Family of annelids

Lopadorrhynchidae is a family of polychaete worms.
