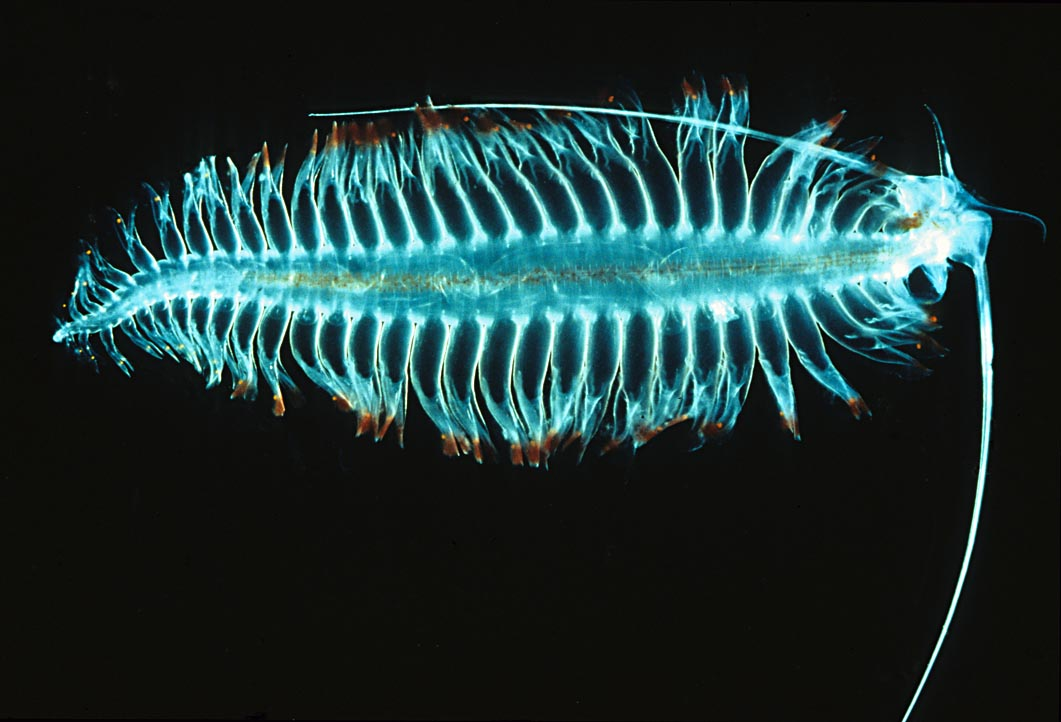
- The planktonic polychaete Tomopteris

Scientific classification
- Kingdom: Animalia
- Phylum: Annelida
- Clade: Pleistoannelida
- Subclass: Errantia
- Clade: Aciculata
- Order: Phyllodocida

Suborders
- Aphroditiformia; Glyceriformia; Nereidiformia; Phyllodociformia

= Phyllodocida =

Phyllodocida Temporal range: Ordovician–Recent

Order of annelid worms

Phyllodocida is an order of polychaete worms in the subclass Errantia. These worms are mostly marine, though some are found in brackish water. Most are active benthic creatures, moving over the surface or burrowing in sediments, or living in cracks and crevices in bedrock. A few construct tubes in which they live and some are pelagic, swimming through the water column. There are estimated to be more than 4,600 accepted species in the order.

== Characteristics ==
Phyllodocida are segmented worms and range in size from a few millimetres long to over a metre. Each segment bears a pair of paddle-like parapodia. The prostomium generally has one or two pairs of eyes, a dorsal pair of antennae, a ventral pair of sensory palps and a pair of organs on the neck. The peristomium is a ring, often hidden dorsally by the prostomium and the first segment. There is a muscular proboscis with one or more pairs of jaws. The next few segments tend to differ from those further back in having enlarged dorsal and ventral cirri (fine appendages) and reduced parapodial lobes and chaetae (bristles). Some species have appendages with specialised functions but most have many segments that are similar to each other but which vary in size and shape along the length of the body without abrupt changes in the chaetae and parapodia from one to the next.

== Biology ==
Worms in this order are generally predators or scavengers.

== Phylogenetic relationships ==
The three main subgroups are Aphroditiformia, Glyceriformia and Nereidiformia. The Aphroditiformia are characterised by the presence of elytrae or scales on alternating segments. The Glyceriformia are characterised by the presence of unique cone-shaped and ringed prostomiums. The Nereidiformia are more problematic, having no universally distinguishing common features. There is agreement on the monophyly of a group including the Hesionidae, Nereididae and Chrysopetalidae families but opinions differ about Pilargidae, and molecular and morphological studies continue.

== Families ==
Recognised families:

Suborder Aphroditiformia

Superfamily Aphroditoidea

Acoetidae
Aphroditidae
Eulepethidae
Iphionidae
Polynoidae
Sigalionidae

Superfamily Chrysopetalacea

Chrysopetalidae

Clade †Machaeridia

Lepidocoleidae
Plumulitidae
Turrilepadidae

Superfamily Pisionacea

Pisionidae

Suborder Glyceriformia

Glyceridae
Goniadidae
Lacydoniidae
Paralacydoniidae

Suborder Nereidiformia

Antonbruuniidae
Hesionidae
Nereididae
Pilargidae
Syllidae

Suborder Phyllodocida incertae sedis

Arkonips
Iospilidae
Nephtyidae
Sphaerodoridae
Tomopteridae
Typhloscolecidae
Yndolaciidae

Suborder Phyllodociformia

Alciopidae
Lopadorrhynchidae
Phyllodocidae
Pontodoridae

Incertae sedis

Nautiliniellidae
