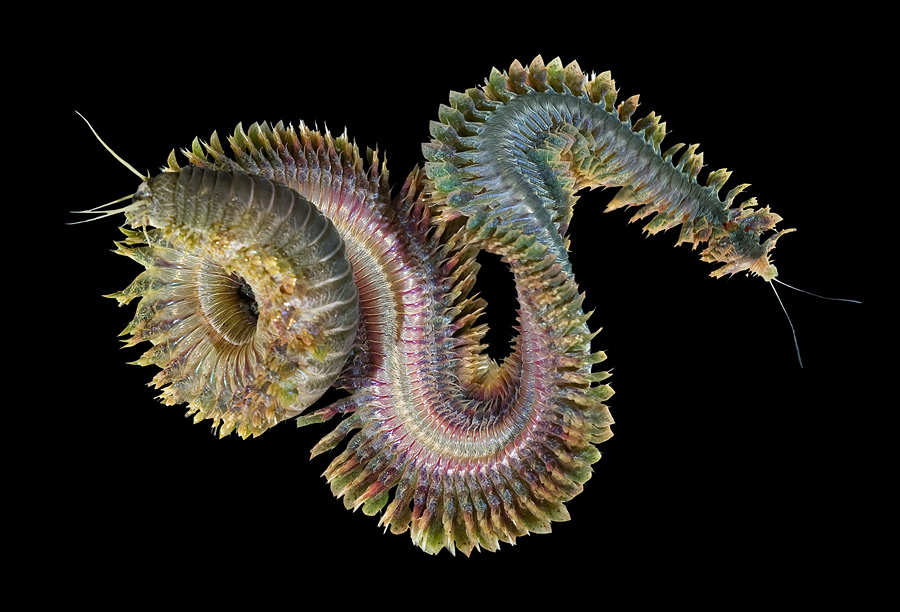
- Alitta virens

Scientific classification
- Kingdom: Animalia
- Phylum: Annelida
- Clade: Pleistoannelida
- Subclass: Errantia; Audouin & H Milne Edwards 1832

Orders
- Aciculata; Eunicida; Phyllodocida; Protodriliformia; Polygordiidae; Protodrilida

= Errantia =

Errantia Temporal range: Cambrian Stage 4–Recent

Subclass of annelid worms

Errantia is a diverse group of marine polychaete worms in the phylum Annelida. Traditionally a subclass of the paraphyletic class Polychaeta, it is currently regarded as a monophyletic group within the larger Pleistoannelida, composed of Errantia and Sedentaria. These worms are found worldwide in marine environments and brackish water.

== Phylogeny ==
The phylogeny of polychaetes is slowly being resolved. Errantia and Sedentaria are the two biggest clades of polychaetes, and together they compose clade Pleistoannelida. Two groups are nested within Errantia: Aciculata (Eunicida + Phyllodocida) and Protodriliformia (small meiofaunal worms such as the Protodrilida).

Historically, the order Amphinomida was part of this subclass. However, phylogenetic analyses place Amphinomida inside a basal clade with Sipunculida and Lobatocerebrum, and this clade is the sister group to Pleistoannelida.

- - Amphinomida
  - - Lobatocerebrum
    - Sipunculida
- Pleistoannelida
  - Errantia
    - Aciculata
      - Eunicida
      - Phyllodocida
    - Protodriliformia
      - Protodrilida
      - Polygordiidae
  - Sedentaria

Some taxa, such as Spintheridae and Myzostomida, are still difficult to place due to their long branching, but they likely belong to either Errantia or Sedentaria.

== Classification ==
=== Historical ===
Errantia is, along with Sedentaria, one of the two old orders of the paraphyletic class "Polychaeta". In 1977 the zoologist Kristian Fauchald split Errantia into three orders: Phyllodocida, Amphinomida and Eunicida, giving way to this classification.

- Order Amphinomida – 2 families (Amphinomidae, Euphrosinidae)
- Order Eunicida
  - Superfamily Eunicea – 7 families (Onuphidae, Eunicidae, Lumbrineridae, Iphitimidae, Arabellidae, Lysaretidae, Dorvilleidae)
  - Superfamily incertae sedis – 2 families (Histriobdellidae, Ichthytomidae)
- Order Phyllodocida
  - Suborder Phyllodociformia – 4 families (Phyllodocidae, Alciopidae, Lopadorrhynchidae, Pontodoridae)
  - Suborder Aphroditiformia
    - Superfamily Aphroditacea – 6 families (Acoetidae, Aphroditidae, Polynoidae, Iphionidae, Eulepethidae, Sigalionidae)
    - Superfamily Chrysopetalacea – 2 families (Chrysopetalidae, Palmyridae)
    - Superfamily Pisionacea – 1 family (Pisionidae)
  - Suborder Nereidiformia – 6 families (Hesionidae, Pilargiidae, Syllidae, Calamyzidae, Nereididae, Antonbmunidae)
  - Suborder Glyceriformia – 3 families (Glyceridae, Goniadidae, Lacydoniidae)
  - Suborder incertae sedis – 5 families (Iospilidae, Nephtyidae, Sphaerodoridae, Tomopteridae, Typhloscolecidae)
