= Foliosum =

The botanical Latin word foliosum is a specific epithet used in the name of several species. The word "foliosum" comes from the Latin "foliosus" which refers to a leaf.

== Flowering plants ==
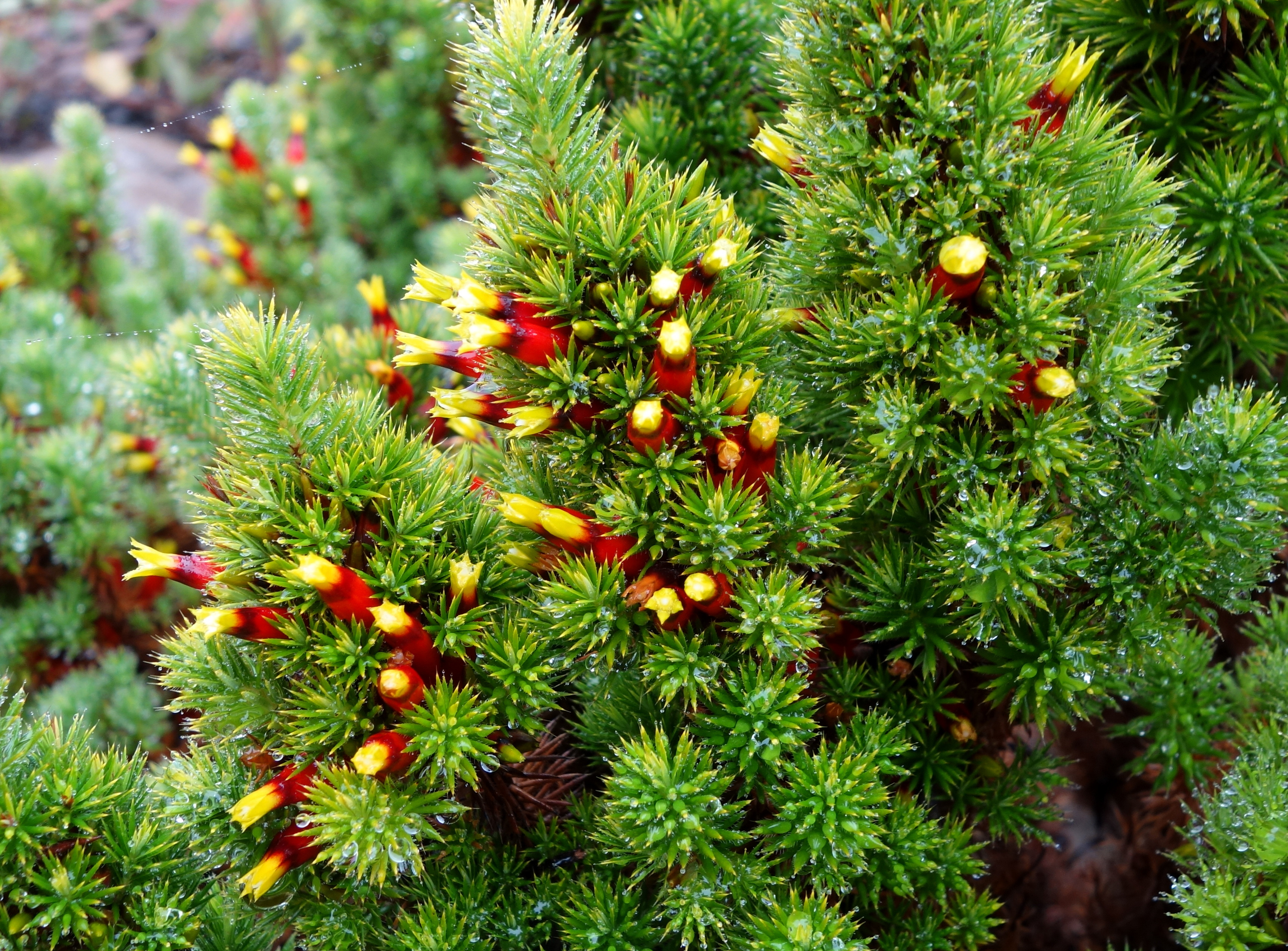
Astroloma foliosum

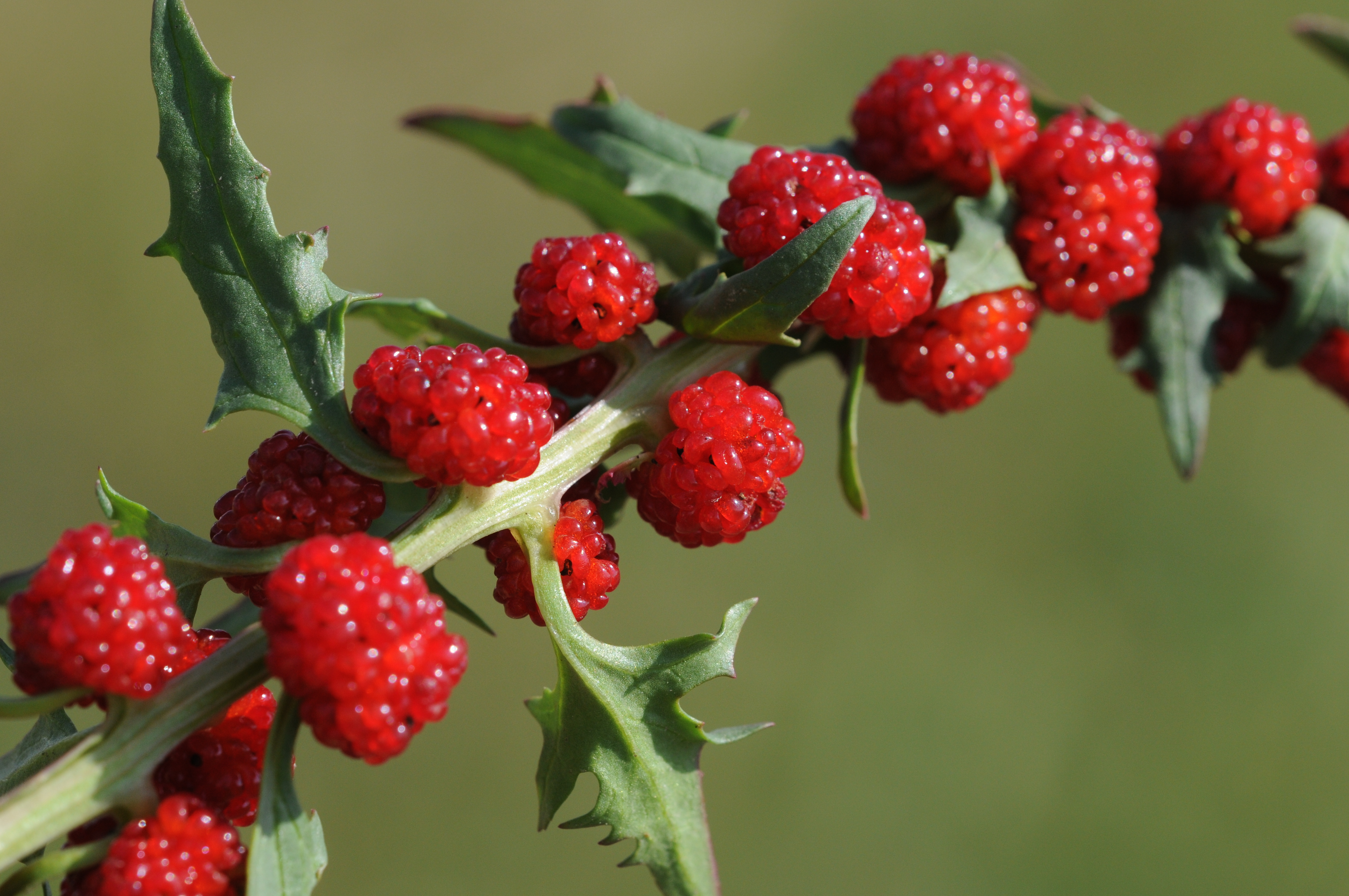
Chenopodium foliosum

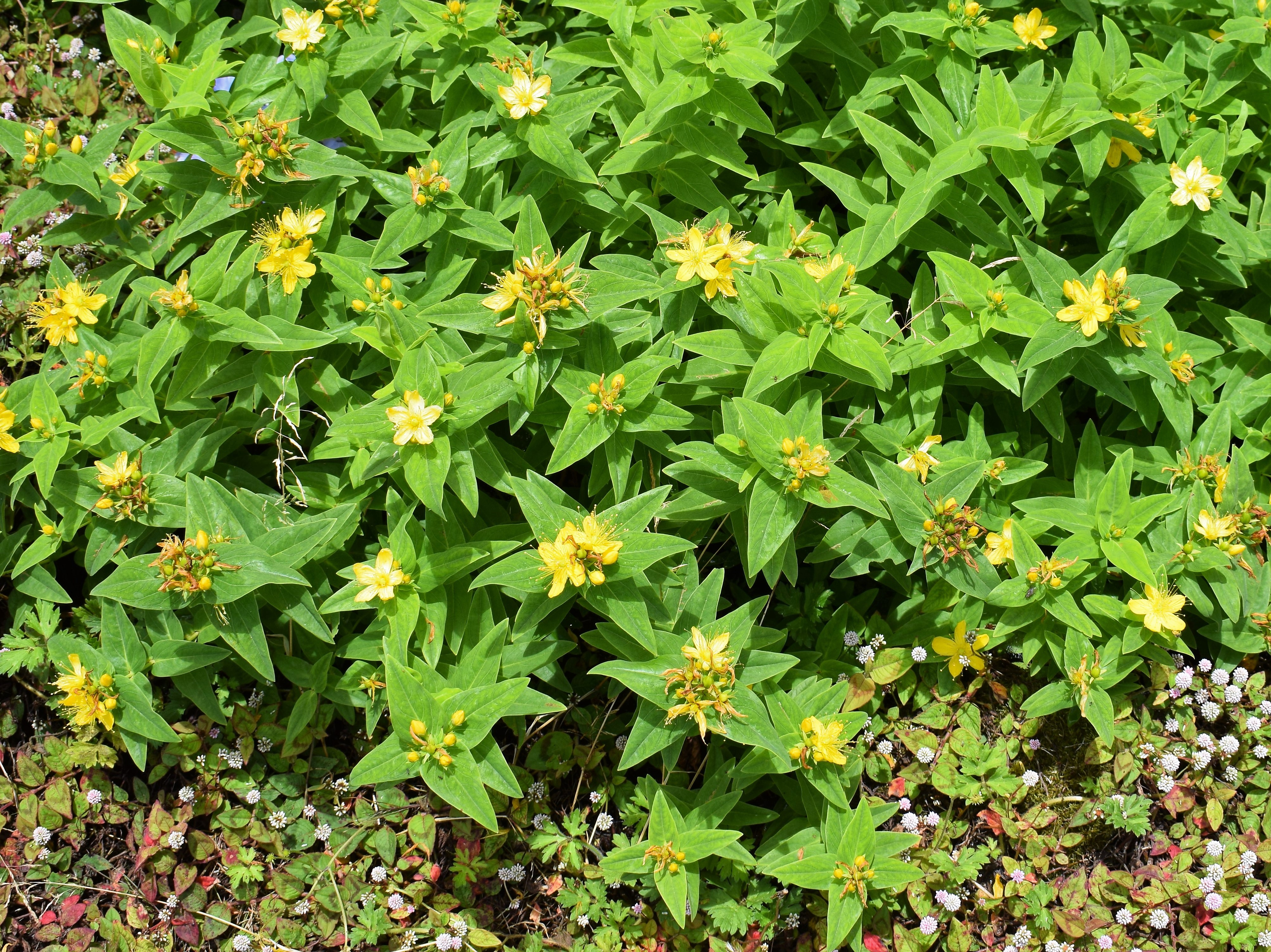
Hypericum foliosum

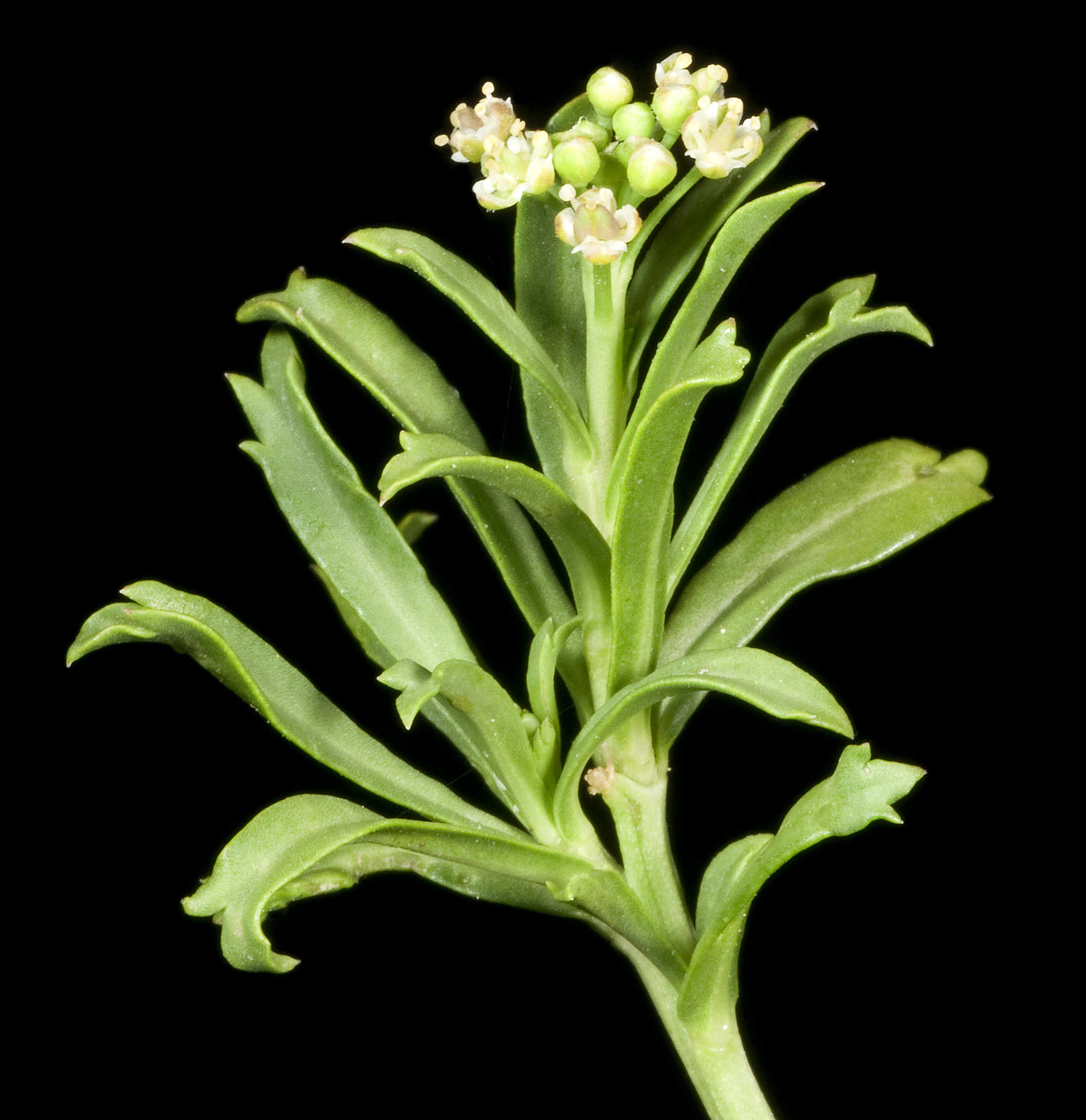
Lepidium foliosum

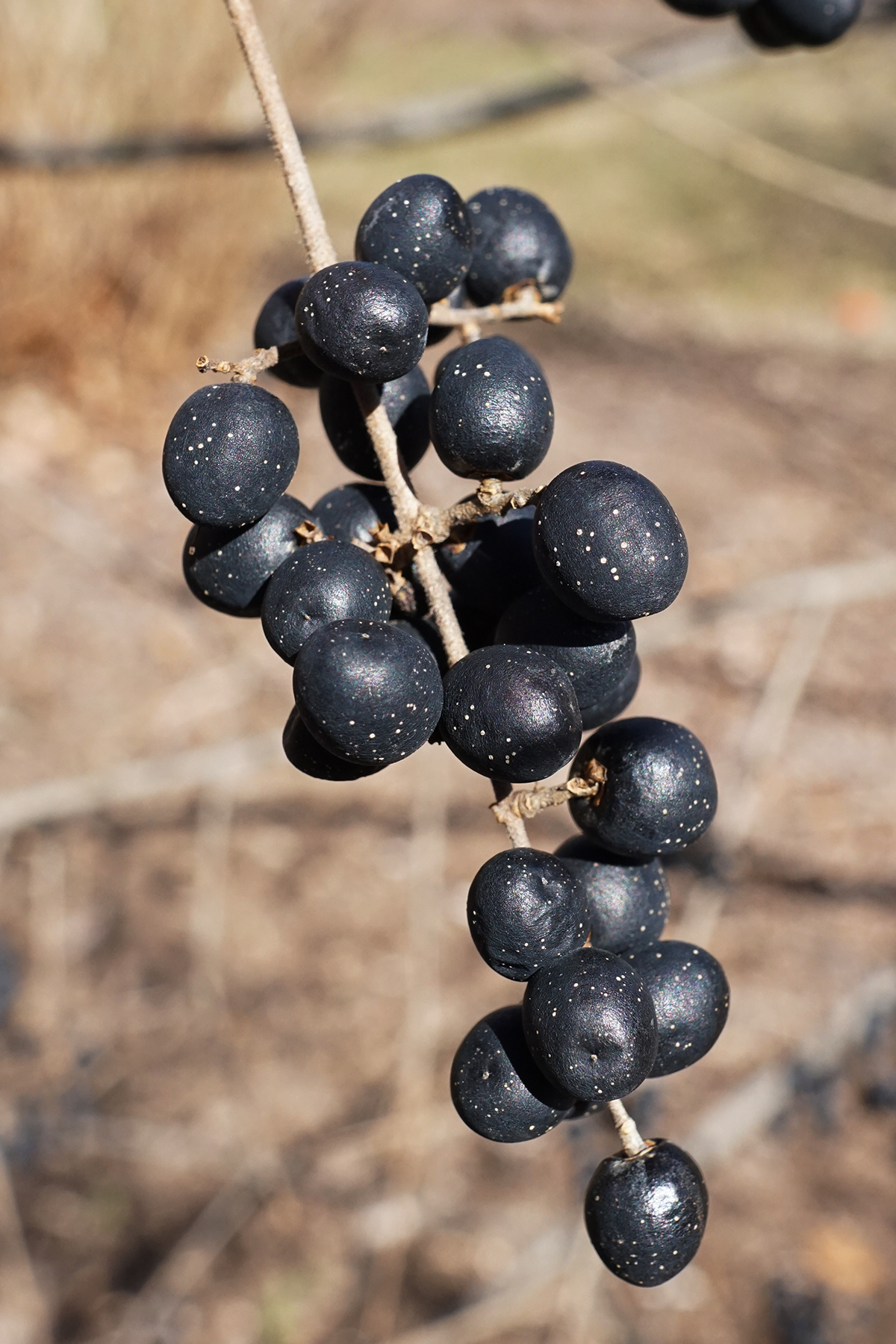
Ligustrum foliosum

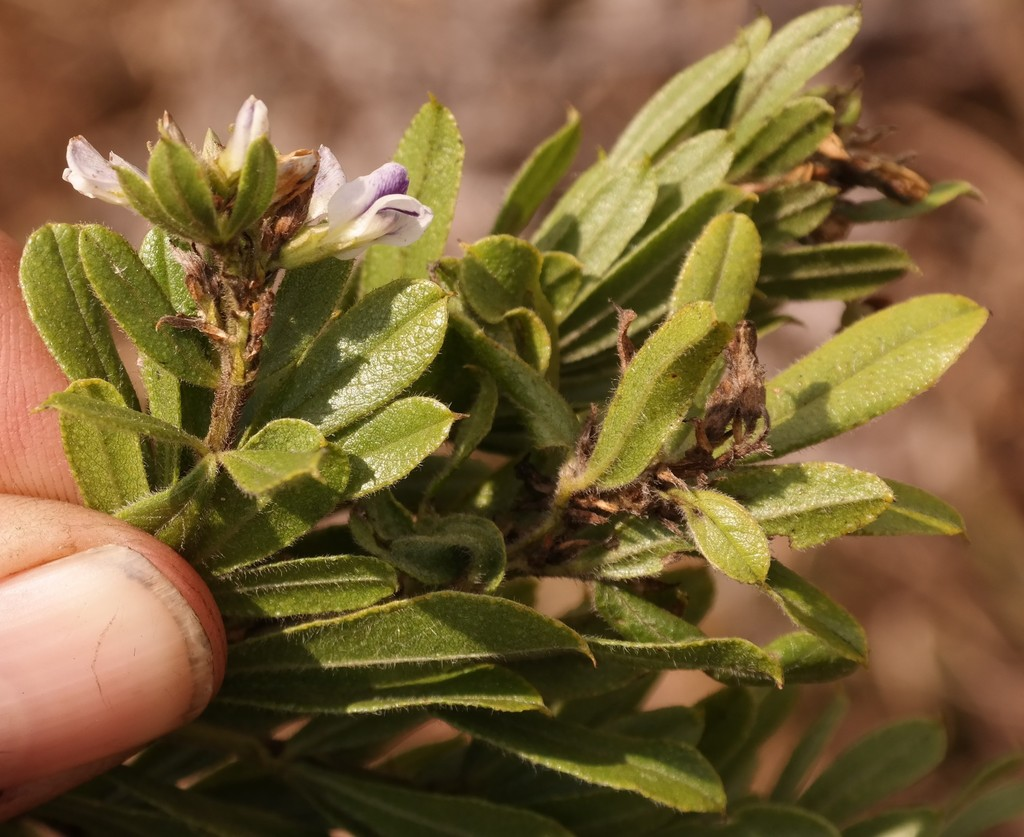
Otholobium foliosum

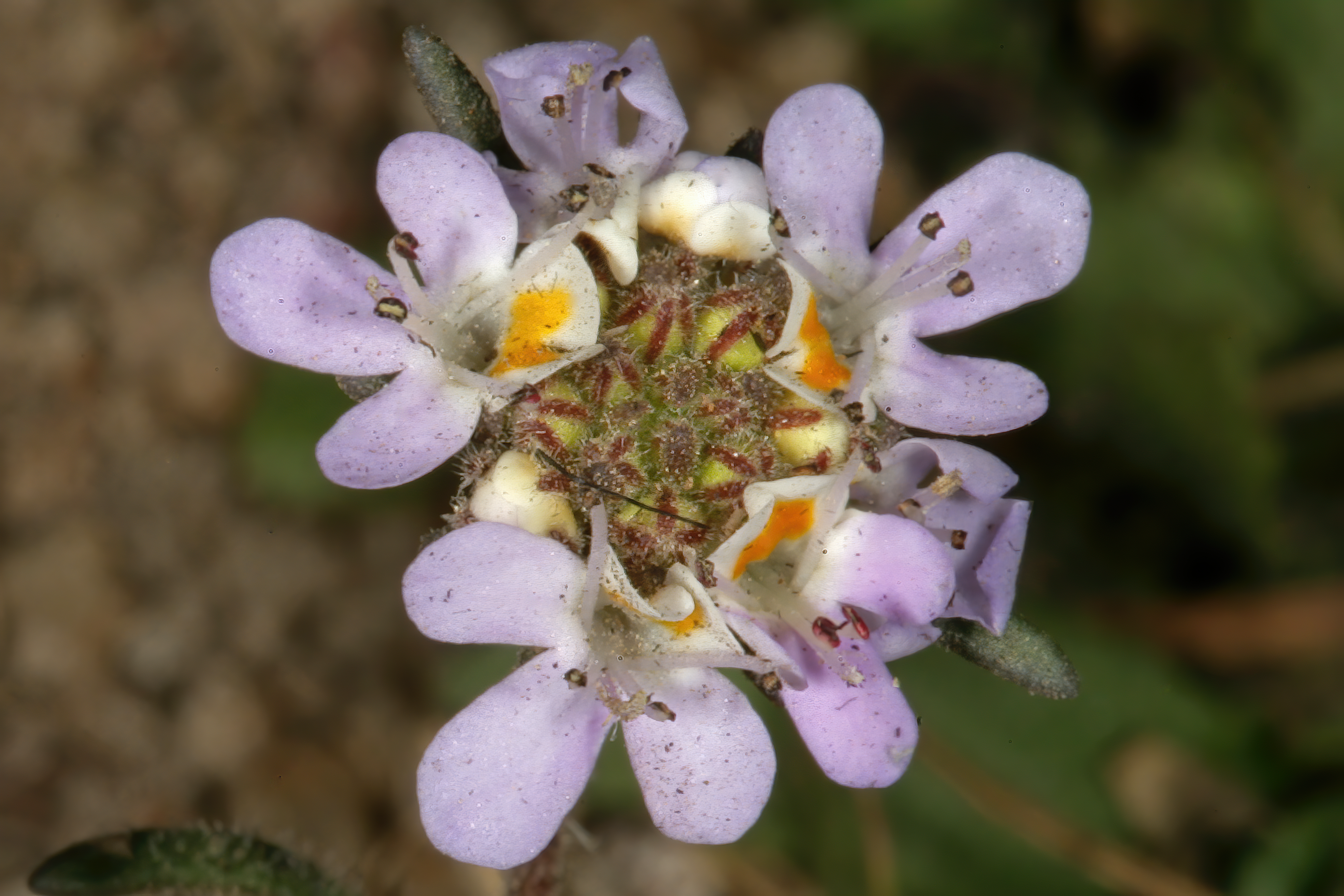
Melanospermum foliosum

The following list consists of flowering plant species names given by the Royal Botanic Garden Kew's Plants of the World Online.

Name		Family	Description			Status
Scientific	Common	Family	Author	Source	Year	Status
Allium foliosum	Chives	Amaryllidaceae	Augustin Pyramus de Candolle	Flore Française	1805	Synonym of Allium schoenoprasum
Alyssum foliosum	Leafy Alyssum	Brassicaceae	Jean-Baptiste Bory, Louis Athanase Chaubard	Expédition Scientifique de Morée Botanique	1832	Accepted
Aneilema foliosum		Commelinaceae	Justus Carl Hasskarl	Plantae Junghuhnianae	1852	Synonym of Murdannia nudiflora
Anomostephium foliosum		Asteraceae	George Gardner	London Journal of Botany	1848	Synonym of Aspilia foliosa
Arctium foliosum		Asteraceae	Otto Kuntze	Revisio Generum Plantarum	1891	Synonym of Cousinia foliosa
Astroloma foliosum	Candle cranberry	Ericaceae	Otto Wilhelm Sonder	Plantae Preissianae	1845	Synonym of Styphelia foliosa
Bechium foliosum		Asteraceae	Friedrich Wilhelm Klatt	Linnaea	1872	Synonym of Vernonia diversifolia
Bupleurum foliosum		Apiaceae	Augustin Pyramus de Candolle	Prodromus Systematis Naturalis Regni Vegetabilis	1830	Accepted
Chenopodium foliosum	Leafy goosefoot	Amaranthaceae	Paul Friedrich August Ascherson	Flora der Provinz Brandenburg	1864	Synonym of Blitum virgatum
Chiropetalum foliosum		Euphorbiaceae	Johannes Müller Argoviensis	Das Pflanzenreich	1912	Accepted
Chrysanthemum foliosum	Paris daisy	Asteraceae	Pierre Marie Auguste Broussonet	Elenchus Plantarum Horti Botanici Monspeliensis	1805	Synonym (Note: Nomen nudum) of Argyranthemum frutescens
Cirsium foliosum	Leafy thistle	Asteraceae	Augustin Pyramus de Candolle	Prodromus Systematis Naturalis Regni Vegetabilis	1838	Accepted
Crossostephium foliosum	California sagebrush	Asteraceae	Per Axel Rydberg	North American Flora	1916	Synonym of Artemisia californica
Cynoglossum foliosum		Boraginaceae	Werner Greuter	Willdenowia	1981	Synonym of Trachelanthus foliosus
Desmodium foliosum		Fabaceae	William Hemsley	Biologia Centrali-Americana	1880	Accepted
Diplostephium foliosum		Asteraceae	Henry Hurd Rusby	Bulletin of the New York Botanical Garden	1912	Synonym of Gynoxys foliosa
Echium foliosum		Boraginaceae	Johann Georg Christian Lehmann	Plantae e Familia Asperifoliarum Nuciferae	1818	Synonym of Echium strictum
Epilobium foliosum	Leafy willowherb	Onagraceae	Wilhelm Nikolaus Suksdorf	Deutsche botanische Monatsschrift	1900	Synonym (Note: Nomen illegitimum) of Epilobium ravenii
Eritrichium foliosum		Boraginaceae	Rodolfo Amando Philippi	Anales de la Universidad de Chile	1895	Synonym of Cryptantha clandestina
Eryngium foliosum		Apiaceae	George Heinrich Adolf Scheele	Linnaea	1843	Accepted
Erysimum foliosum		Brassicaceae	Joseph Dalton Hooker & Samuel Thomson	Journal of the Proceedings of the Linnean Society	1861	Synonym of Erysimum virgatum
Erythrocephalum foliosum		Asteraceae	Karl August Otto Hoffmann	Botanische Jahrbücher für Systematik	1893	Synonym of Erythrocephalum dianthiflorum
Gnaphalium foliosum		Asteraceae	Jean Louis Marie Poiret	Encyclopédie Méthodique, Botanique, Supplément	1812	Synonym of Helichrysum cespitosum
Gymnophyton foliosum		Apiaceae	Rodolfo Amando Philippi	Florula Atacamensis	1860	Accepted
Helenium foliosum		Asteraceae	Ángel Lulio Cabrera	Notas del Museo de La Plata Botánica	1944	Synonym of Helenium glaucum
Helichrysum foliosum		Asteraceae	Jean-Henri Humbert	Les Composées de Madagascar	1923	Accepted
Heliotropium foliosum		Boraginaceae	Carl Ludwig Willdenow	Systema Vegetabilium	1819	Synonym of Euploca polyphylla
Hieracium foliosum	Queendevil	Asteraceae	Ernst Gottlieb von Steudel	Nomenclator Botanicus	1821	Synonym (Note: not validly published) of Hieracium gronovii
Hypericum foliosum	Shining St John's wort	Hypericaceae	William Aiton	Hortus Kewensis	1789	Accepted
Isostigma foliosum		Asteraceae	Gustaf Oskar Andersson Malme	Acta Holmensia	1899	Synonym of Isostigma scorzonerifolium
Leontopodium foliosum		Asteraceae	Gustave Beauverd	Bulletin de la Société Botanique de Genève	1909	Synonym of Leontopodium dedekensi
Lepidium foliosum	Leafy peppercress	Brassicaceae	Nicaise Auguste Desvaux	Journal de Botanique Appliquée	1814	Accepted
Macrachaenium foliosum		Asteraceae	Nikolai Albov	Revista del Museo de La Plata	1896	Synonym of Macrachaenium gracile
Marilaunidium foliosum	Sand bells	Boraginaceae	Elmer Ottis Wooton, Paul Carpenter Standley	Contributions from the United States National Herbarium	1913	Synonym of Nama hispida
Mesembryanthemum foliosum		Aizoaceae	Adrian Hardy Haworth	Miscellanea Naturalia	1803	Synonym of Ruschia foliosa
Monechma foliosum	Rhebuckbush	Acanthaceae	Charles Baron Clarke	Flora Capensis	1901	Synonym of Justicia cuneata
Nasturtium foliosum	Leafy peppercress	Brassicaceae	Otto Kuntze	Revisio Generum Plantarum	1891	Synonym of Lepidium foliosum
Ornithogalum foliosum		Liliaceae	Adrian Hardy Haworth	Zeitschrift für Sukkulentenkunde	1927	Synonym of Gagea foliosa
Orthophytum foliosum		Bromeliaceae	Lyman Bradford Smith	Arquivos de botânica do estado de São Paulo	1938	Accepted
Oxypetalum foliosum		Apocynaceae	Carl Friedrich Philipp von Martius	Nova Genera et Species Plantarum	1824	Accepted
Phyteuma foliosum		Campanulaceae	Pauli Kitaibelii	Linnaea	1864	Synonym (Note: Nomen illegitimum) of Asyneuma canescens
Psilocaulon foliosum		Aizoaceae	Louisa Bolus	Notes Mesembryanthemum	1929	Synonym of Mesembryanthemum neofoliosum
Rapuntium foliosum		Campanulaceae	Carl Borivoj Presl	Prodromus Monographiae Lobeliacearum	1836	Synonym of Lobelia decurrens
Sempervivum foliosum		Crassulaceae	Christen Smith	Horae Physicae Berolinenses	1820	Synonym of Aeonium smithii
Seseli foliosum		Apiaceae	Stephano Sommier, Emilio Levier	Zametki po Sistematike i Geografii Rasteniĭ	1941	Accepted
Silaum foliosum		Apiaceae	Stephano Sommier, Emilio Levier	Flora Kavkaza	1932	Synonym of Seseli foliosum
Sisymbrium foliosum		Brassicaceae	Joseph Dalton Hooker & Samuel Thomson	Journal of the Proceedings of the Linnean Society	1861	Synonym of Olimarabidopsis pumila
Symphytum foliosum	Tuberous comfrey	Boraginaceae	Anton Rehmann	Verhandlungen der Kaiserlich-Königlichen Zoologisch-Botanischen Gesellschaft in Wien	1868	Synonym of Symphytum tuberosum
Thaspium foliosum		Apiaceae	John Forbes Royle	Illustrations of the Botany of the Himalayan Mountains	1833	Synonym of Seseli petrosciadium
Trachycalymma foliosum		Apocynaceae	Karl Moritz Schumann	Kew Bulletin	2001	Synonym of Asclepias foliosa

== Other plants ==
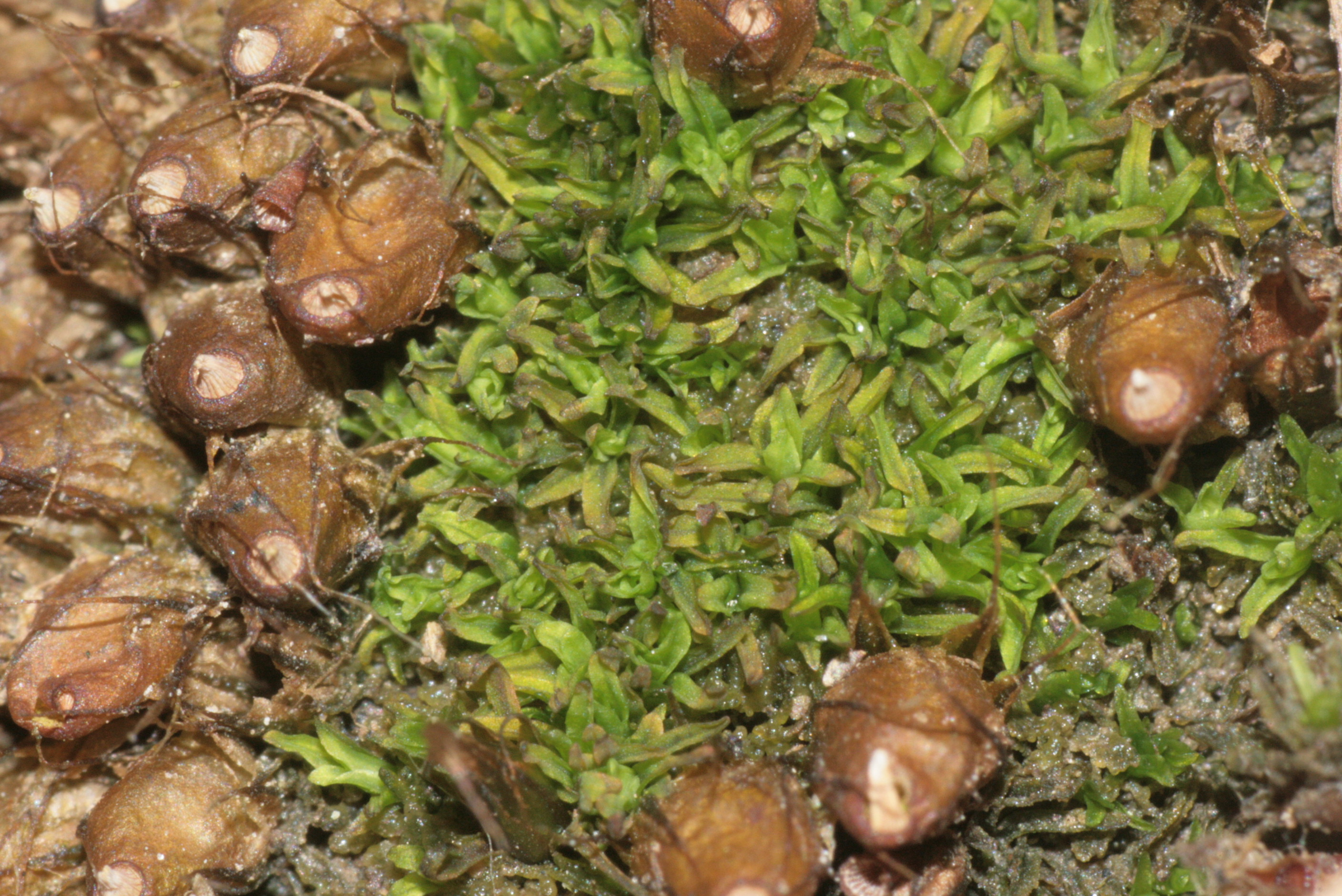
Diphyscium foliosum

The following list consists of non-flowering plant species names given by Flora of North America and the Global Biodiversity Information Facility.

Name		Classification		Description			Status
Scientific	Common	Type	Family	Author	Source	Year	Status
Asplenium foliosum	Bird's Nest Fern	Fern	Athyriaceae				Synonym of Athyrium fimbriatum
Diphyscium foliosum	Nut-moss	Moss	Diphysciaceae	Daniel Matthias Heinrich Mohr	Observationes Botanicae	1891	Accepted
Gymnostomum foliosum		Moss	Pottiaceae	Johann Christoph Röhling		1810	Accepted

== Marine animals ==
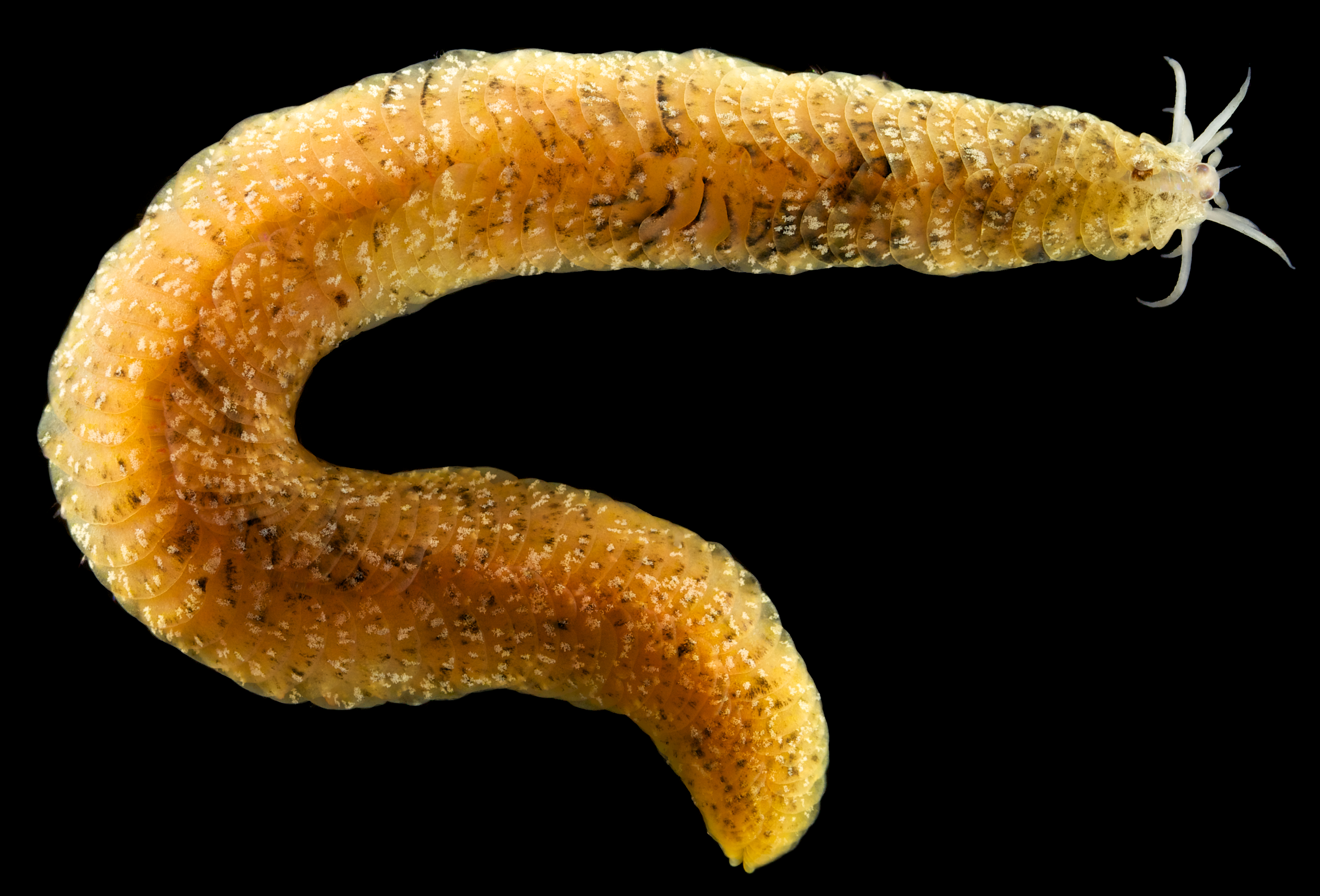
Notophyllum foliosum

The following list consists of marine animal names given by the World Register of Marine Species.

Name		Classification		Description			Status
Scientific	Common	Type	Family	Author	Source	Year	Status
Buccinum foliosum	Mutable nassa	Mollusc	Nassariidae	William Wood	Index Testaceologicus	1818	Synonym of Tritia mutabilis
Notophyllum foliosum		Annelid	Phyllodocidae	Michael Sars	Beskrivelser og Iagttagelser	1835	Accepted
Plesiocleidochasma foliosum		Bryozoan	Phidoloporidae	Judith Winston, Leandro Vieira & Robert Woollacott	Bulletin of the Museum of Comparative Zoology	2014	Accepted
Sinoeremoceras foliosum†		Mollusc	Plectronoceratidae†	T. Chen & D. Qi	Acta Palaeontologica Sinica	1979	Synonym of Sinoeremoceras bullatum†

== See also ==
- Foliosa
- Foliosus
- Foliatus
- Foliaceus
