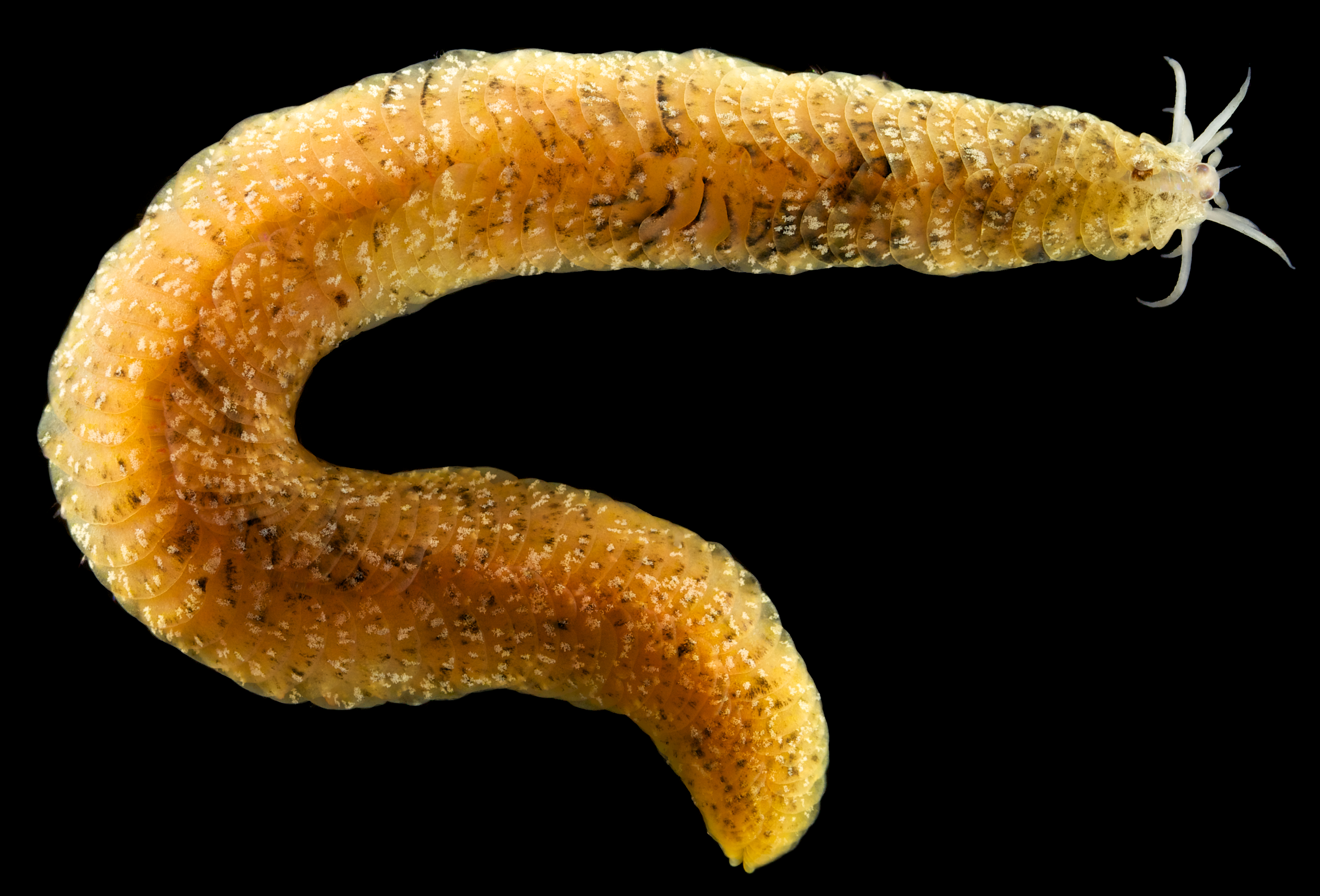

Scientific classification
- Kingdom: Animalia
- Phylum: Annelida
- Clade: Pleistoannelida
- Subclass: Errantia
- Order: Phyllodocida
- Family: Phyllodocidae
- Genus: Notophyllum
- Species: N. foliosum

Binomial name
- Notophyllum foliosum (Sars, 1835)

Synonyms
- Eulalia obtecta Ehlers, 1864; Notophyllum alatum Langerhans, 1880; Notophyllum longum Örsted, 1843; Notophyllum polynoide Örsted, 1845; Notophyllum viride Örsted, 1843; Phyllodoce foliosa Sars, 1835; Trachelophyllum luetkeni Levinsen, 1883

= Notophyllum foliosum =

Species of annelid

Notophyllum foliosum is a species of annelid in the family Phyllodocidae. Roughly 12 millimeters long, the annelid is bristly and covered in scale-like cirri. The species is found in shallow areas of the seafloor of the Mediterranean, Scandinavia, and Madeira. It was originally described as Phyllodoce foliosa in 1835 and was moved to the genus Notophyllum in 1923. The species was split in two in 2010, with the deeper-dwelling Notophyllum crypticum being designated its own species.

== Description ==
Notophyllum foliosum is approximately 12 millimeters long, and has many bristly segments followed by a pygidium. It has wide dorsal cirri that overlap one another like scales. Like Nereis pelagica, the species' palps are located further back on the body than the paired antennae. At the end of its pharynx is a ring of simple papillae. Notophyllum foliosum is the only Scandinavian species of Phyllodocidae that has double-branched parapodia.

Notophyllum foliosum has one pair of eyes attached directly to the brain. It is similar to those of Phyllodoce species and Paranaitis wahlbergi. However, it does not possess ganglia at the bottom of its central antenna, and its front four ganglia are much smaller. The nuchal organs take the form of outgrowths called "epaulettes" and the nuchal ganglia are similar in structure along the length of its body. The positioning of these nuchal ganglia are similar to those of Eulalia. Each nuchal organ has four joints, which on the top side are dispersed into the front ganglion and on the bottom side into the rear ganglion.

Notophyllum foliosum is smaller and has more rounded dorsal cirri than the related species Notophyllum imbricatum.

== Taxonomy and etymology ==
The specific epithet "foliosum" comes from the Latin "foliosus" which refers to something leaf-like.

The species was originally described under the name Phyllodoce foliosa by Michael Sars in 1835. It was moved to the genus Notophyllum in 1923 by Pierre Fauvel. In 2010, the species was redefined and split in two. Previously, two color morphs of Notophyllum foliosum were known, with one found in deep water among coral, and the other in shallower areas of the seabed. The shallow form retained the name N. foliosum, but the deeper form was split off and given the new name Notophyllum crypticum. It was suggested in 2017 that it was incorrect to treat N. alatum and N. frontale, two formerly accepted species from Madeira, as synonyms of N. foliosum.

A 2007 Bayesian analysis of phylogenetic data found that Notophyllum foliosum was more closely related to Phyllodoce groenlandica than any other species in Phyllodoce.

== Distribution and habitat ==
Notophyllum foliosum was originally described from a holotype collected in Norway, and can be found in the Mediterranean Sea, around the island of Madeira, and off the coasts of Scandinavia. Its habitat is the seafloor in shallow areas of 20–125 metres (66–410 ft) among gravel and stones, and occasionally near the coral Lophelia pertusa.

== Reproduction ==
Female Notophyllum foliosum incubate their eggs underneath lamellae that are towards their rear. The eggs form a yellow gelatinous mass that are joined together to create a long ribbon-like structure, which wraps around the rear end of the annelid. This method of incubation is similar to the related species Harmothoe imbricata and Polynoe antarctica.
