= Eulalia clavigera =

Scientific classification
- Kingdom: Animalia
- Phylum: Annelida
- Clade: Pleistoannelida
- Subclass: Errantia
- Order: Phyllodocida
- Family: Phyllodocidae
- Genus: Eulalia
- Species: E. clavigera

Binomial name
- Eulalia clavigera (Audouin & Milne Edwards, 1833)

Synonyms
- Phyllodoce clavigera Audouin & Milne Edwards, 1833

Species of annelid worm

Eulalia clavigera is a species of polychaete worm in the family Phyllodocidae, native to the coasts around Britain, through Western France, and to the Iberian Peninsula. It closely resembles Eulalia viridis, and there has been confusion in the past as to the identification of the two species.

== Description ==
Eulalia clavigera is a slender worm growing to a length of about 10 cm (4 in). The prostomium (head) has a rounded triangular shape and is rather wider than it is long. It has a pair of palps and three antennae, the central one being located in front of the large eyes. The eversible proboscis is scattered with small conical papillae. There are four pairs of tentacular cirri on body segments one to four. The parapodia of the body segments bear large, paddle-shaped dorsal cirri, about twice as long as they are broad, while the ventral cirri are oval. This worm is bright green, sometimes with black spots on the underside of the base of the parapodia. E. clavigera is very similar in appearance to its close relative Eulalia viridis. The chief differences between the two lie in the shape and size of the dorsal cirri.

== Distribution and habitat ==
Before the 1990s, E. viridis was thought to have a wide range in the northeastern Atlantic including the waters around the United Kingdom, but morphological and biochemical studies led to the southern populations being recognised as a separate species E. clavigera, part of a species complex with E. viridis. This means that the distribution of E. clavigera is not well understood, with references in the literature referring to E viridis possibly being misapplied; however, E. clavigera is present around the coasts of Britain and southwards to France and the Iberian Peninsula, and possibly into the Mediterranean Sea. Its depth range is from the middle shore to the sublittoral zone. It typically lives in crevices, under stones, among the holdfasts of large seaweeds and among mussels and barnacles.

== Biology ==
Eulalia clavigera is predominantly a scavenger and feeds on dead or damaged invertebrates such as barnacles and mussels. Sexually mature individuals have been observed during July and August, while sexually mature E. viridis are generally seen between February and May.
