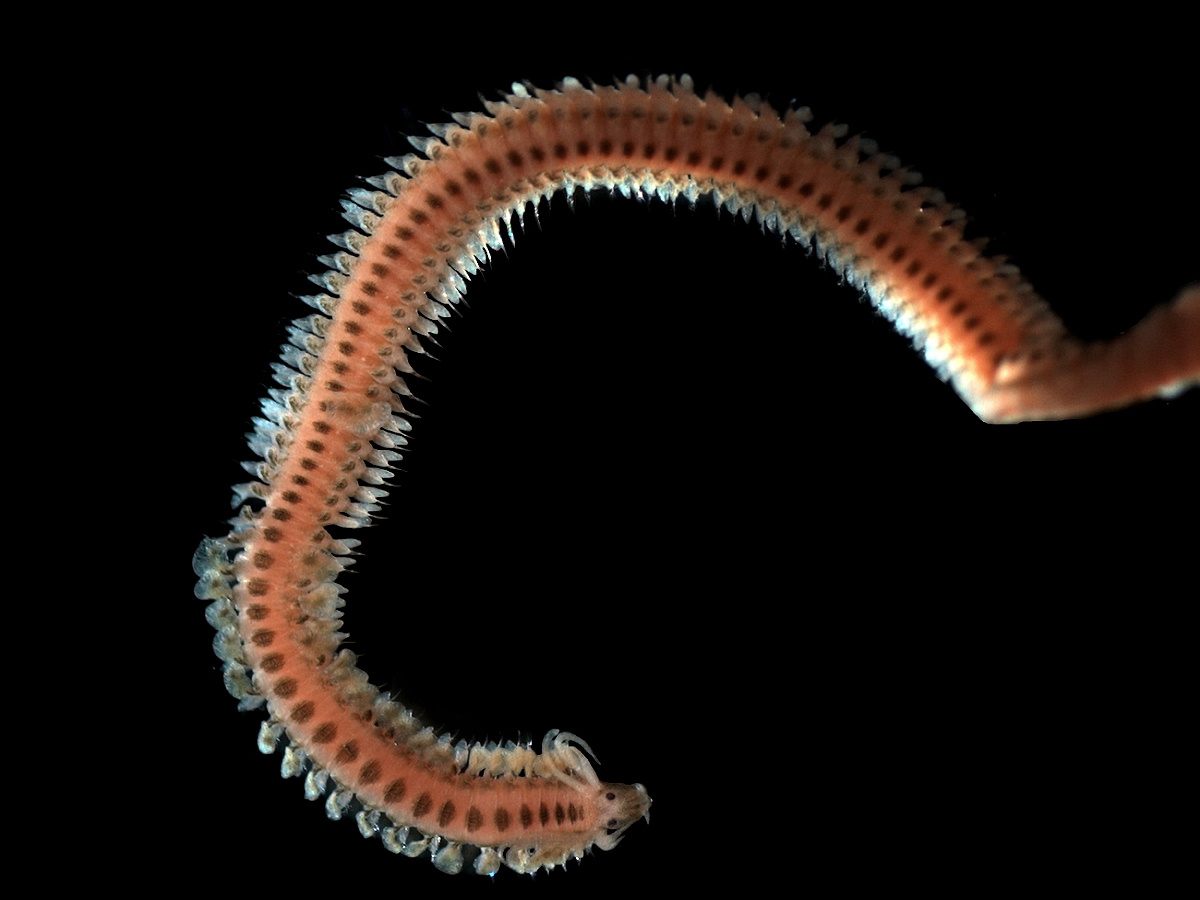

Scientific classification
- Kingdom: Animalia
- Phylum: Annelida
- Clade: Pleistoannelida
- Subclass: Errantia
- Order: Phyllodocida
- Family: Phyllodocidae
- Genus: Phyllodoce
- Species: P. mucosa

Binomial name
- Phyllodoce mucosa Örsted, 1843

Synonyms
- Anaitides mucosa (Örsted, 1843)

= Phyllodoce mucosa =

Species of annelid worm

Phyllodoce mucosa is a species of polychaete worm in the family Phyllodocidae. It is found intertidally in both the Pacific and Atlantic Oceans, typically on sandy or muddy seabeds.

== Description ==
Phyllodoce mucosa is a long and slender worm, growing to a maximum length of about 15 cm (6 in) and some 275 segments. The head and first segment (only visible from below) are dark-coloured, with some yellow pigment at the back of the head and the front of segment 2. The next two segments are colourless, and the remaining segments have a large dark spot dorsally, placed across the segment boundary. In the posterior part of the animal these tend to coalesce into a continuous dark band; additionally there are a pair of small yellow spots on each segment of this region. The ventral surface is also spotted with dark pigment, but less distinctly so.

Like other members of its family, P. mucosa has a reversible pharynx which can be turned inside out and which is used to catch prey or engulf food fragments. It has no jaws. The head has a pair of antennae at the front, a central antenna known as a "nuchal papilla" a pair of eyes and a pair of palps underneath. The body has both dorsal and ventral branched cirri, the dorsal ones being the larger.

== Distribution and habitat ==
The species is sometimes confused with Phyllodoce maculata so its precise range is unclear, but it is present in the Arctic Ocean, the North Pacific Ocean, the North Atlantic Ocean, the Gulf of Mexico, the North Sea, the Mediterranean Sea and the Black Sea. It is present on intertidal sand and mud flats, stones and shelly gravels, at depths down to about 20 m (70 ft).

== Biology ==
Phyllodoce mucosa is a scavenger, carnivore and feeder on carrion. As mud and sand flats are uncovered during falling tides at night, the worms emerge from the sediment and move rapidly towards any dead animal, such as a mollusc, crab, or worm, lying on the surface. They can detect the corpse from 15 m (50 ft) or more. As each worm crawls it leaves a copious trail of mucus behind it and other worms are guided by this and form "roads" as they also move towards the carcass. There the worms suck at the dead tissue and may increase their body weight by a third before retreating back into the sediment.

At breeding time, swarms of mature adults form in surface waters. Females produce gelatinous egg masses containing more than 10,000 eggs which are attached to fronds of seaweed. The developing larvae pass through one or two trochophore stages and two further metatrochophore stages before settling on the seabed as larvae with five to nine segments. The larval stage lasts for up to about nine weeks.
