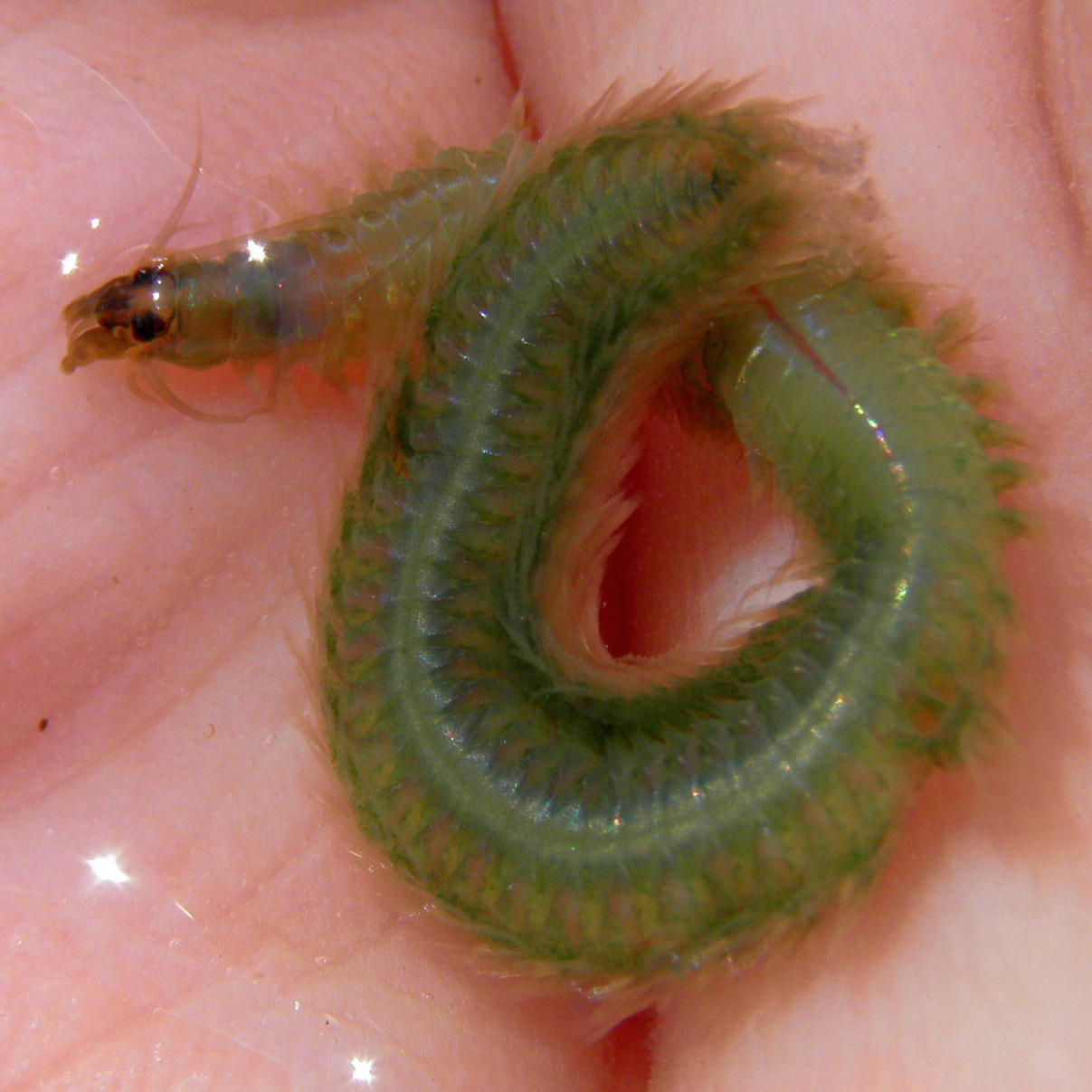

Scientific classification
- Kingdom: Animalia
- Phylum: Annelida
- Clade: Pleistoannelida
- Subclass: Errantia
- Order: Phyllodocida
- Family: Phyllodocidae
- Genus: Eulalia
- Species: E. viridis

Binomial name
- Eulalia viridis (Linnaeus, 1767)

Synonyms
- Eulalia (Eumida) microceros Claparède, 1868; Eulalia annulata Verrill, 1873; Eulalia brevisetis Saint-Joseph, 1899; Eulalia virens Ehlers, 1864; Eumidia vivida Verrill, 1873; Nereis viridis Linnaeus, 1767 (basonym); Phyllodoce gervillei Audouin & Milne Edwards, 1833

= Eulalia viridis =

Species of annelid worm

Eulalia viridis is a species of bright-green polychaete worm in the family Phyllodocidae. It can range from 5 to 15 cm (2 to 6 in) in length and is usually found in shallow north Atlantic water under rocks or in mussel beds.

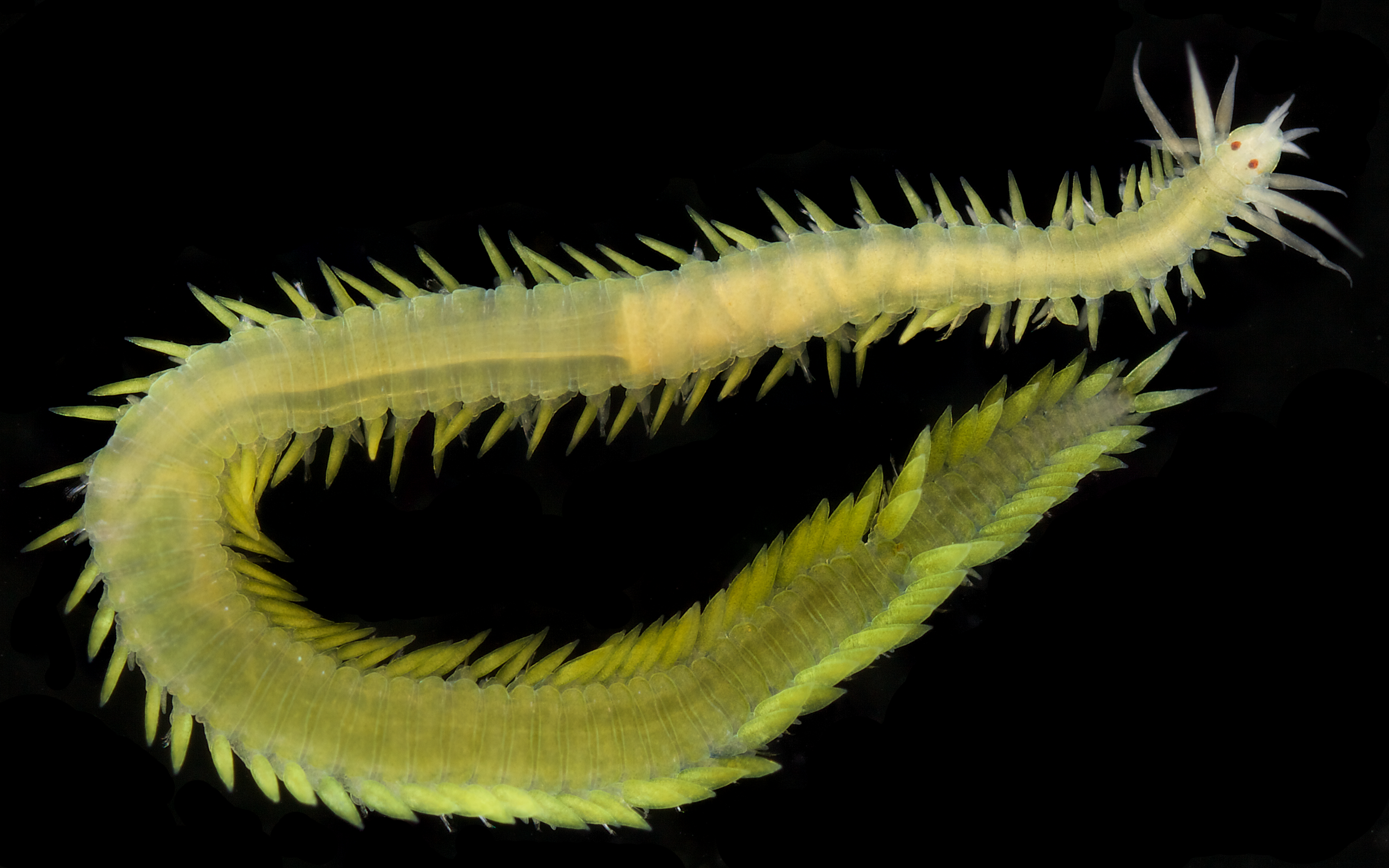

== Description ==
Eulalia viridis is a dorsally flattened, slender worm with up to 200 segments. It grows to a length of 15 cm (6 in) and is mid-green or bright green in colour. The head bears five antennae, two eyes and four pairs of tentacular cirri; the eversible proboscis is cylindrical and dotted with rounded papillae. Each body segment has a pair of parapodia, and the cirri on these are long, thin and pointed. They project outwards, forming a fringe down each side of the body.

== Distribution and habitat ==
Before the 1990s, E. viridis was thought to have a wide range in the northeastern Atlantic including the waters around the United Kingdom, but morphological and biochemical studies led to the southern populations being recognised as a separate species Eulalia clavigera, part of a species complex with E. viridis.

As now recognised, E. viridis is native to the northeastern Atlantic Ocean where it is found in the waters off Norway, Sweden, Denmark and Germany, as well as the Faroe Islands, Iceland and Disko Island at depths from the mid-shore down to about 150 m (500 ft). It is typically found on rocky coasts and on shelly gravel, in rock crevices and mussel beds.

== Biology ==
Although many worms in this family are predators and actively hunt prey, E. viridis seems to be more selective in its diet, and researchers found that it only consumed moribund or dead animal tissue. Breeding does not take place until the worms are at least two years old, and they are not thought to form swarms as do some other related species. The greenish gelatinous egg mass is attached to brown algae, but some populations seem not to have egg masses. The larvae pass through one or two trochophore stages and two other stages before settling on the sea bed as a five- to nine-segmented larva, after up to nine weeks.
