= Eulalia microphylla =

Scientific classification
- Kingdom: Animalia
- Phylum: Annelida
- Clade: Pleistoannelida
- Subclass: Errantia
- Order: Phyllodocida
- Family: Phyllodocidae
- Genus: Eulalia
- Species: E. microphylla

Binomial name
- Eulalia microphylla Schmarda, 1861

Synonyms
- Eulalia (Porroa) microphylla Schmarda, 1861; Eulalia caeca Quatrefages, 1866; Porroa microphylla (Schmarda, 1861)

Species of annelid worm

Eulalia microphylla, also known as the New Zealand paddle worm, is a species of polychaete worm in the family Phyllodocidae, native to the coasts around New Zealand, Australia and New Caledonia.

== Description ==
Eulalia microphylla has a strongly convex dorsum, and is dark green in colour. The species has four eyes, two frontal tentacles, two lateral tentacles, and a single nuchal tentacle.

== Taxonomy ==
The species was first described by Ludwig Karl Schmarda in 1861.

== Distribution and habitat ==
The species is found in the waters surrounding New Zealand, New Caledonia, and Australia in the Bass Strait and central west coast, often found on stones embedded in mud.

== Gallery ==
Close-up of E. microphylla

Close-up of E. microphylla
