= Foliaceus =

The word foliaceus is a specific epithet used in the name of several species. Foliaceus is Latin and is used to describe something that is leafy or looks like a leaf. It is applied to plants with large or showy foliage, and to animals with features that resemble leaves (such as the wings of the fly Exilibittacus foliaceus).

== Plants ==
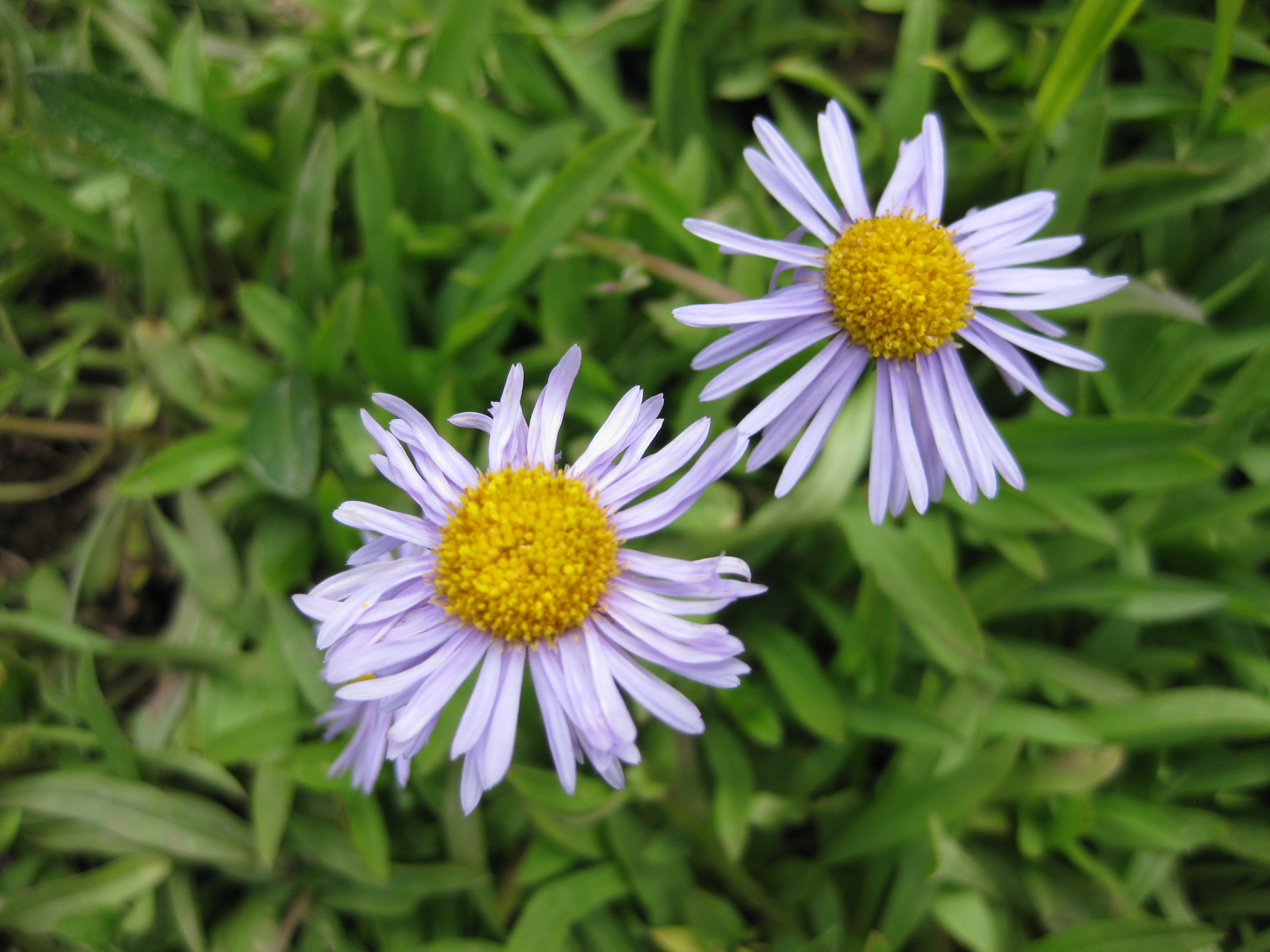
Aster foliaceus

The following list consists of flowering plant species names that include foliaceus. Species are included based on the Royal Botanic Garden Kew's Plants of the World Online.

Name		Family	Description			Status
Scientific	Common	Family	Author	Source	Year	Status
Aster foliaceus	Leafy aster	Asteraceae	John Lindley	Prodromus Systematis Naturalis Regni Vegetabilis	1836	Synonym of Symphyotrichum foliaceum

== Marine animals ==
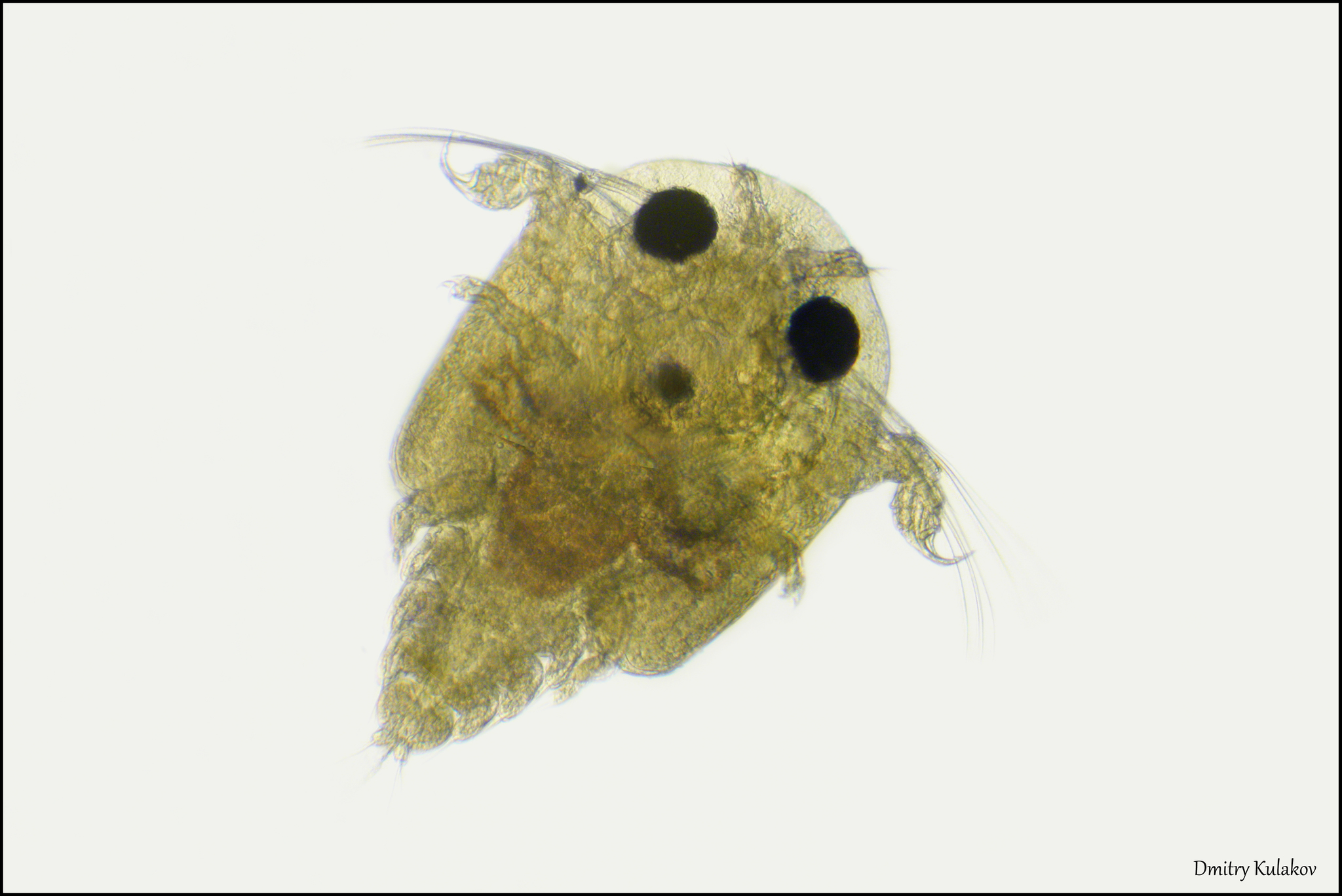
Argulus foliaceus

The following list consists of marine animal species names that include foliaceus. Species are included based on the World Register of Marine Species.

Name		Classification		Description			Status
Scientific	Common	Type	Family	Author	Source	Year	Status
Argulus foliaceus	Common fish louse	Arthropod	Argulidae	Carl Linnaeus		1758	Accepted

== Other animals ==
The following list consists of animal species names that include foliaceus. Species are included based on the Global Biodiversity Information Facility database.

Name		Classification		Description			Status
Scientific	Common	Type	Family	Author	Source	Year	Status
Exilibittacus foliaceus		Arthropod	Bittacidae	Sulin Liu, Chungkun Chih, Ren Dong	ZooKeys	2014	Accepted

== See also ==
- Foliosa
- Foliosum
- Foliosus
- Foliatus
