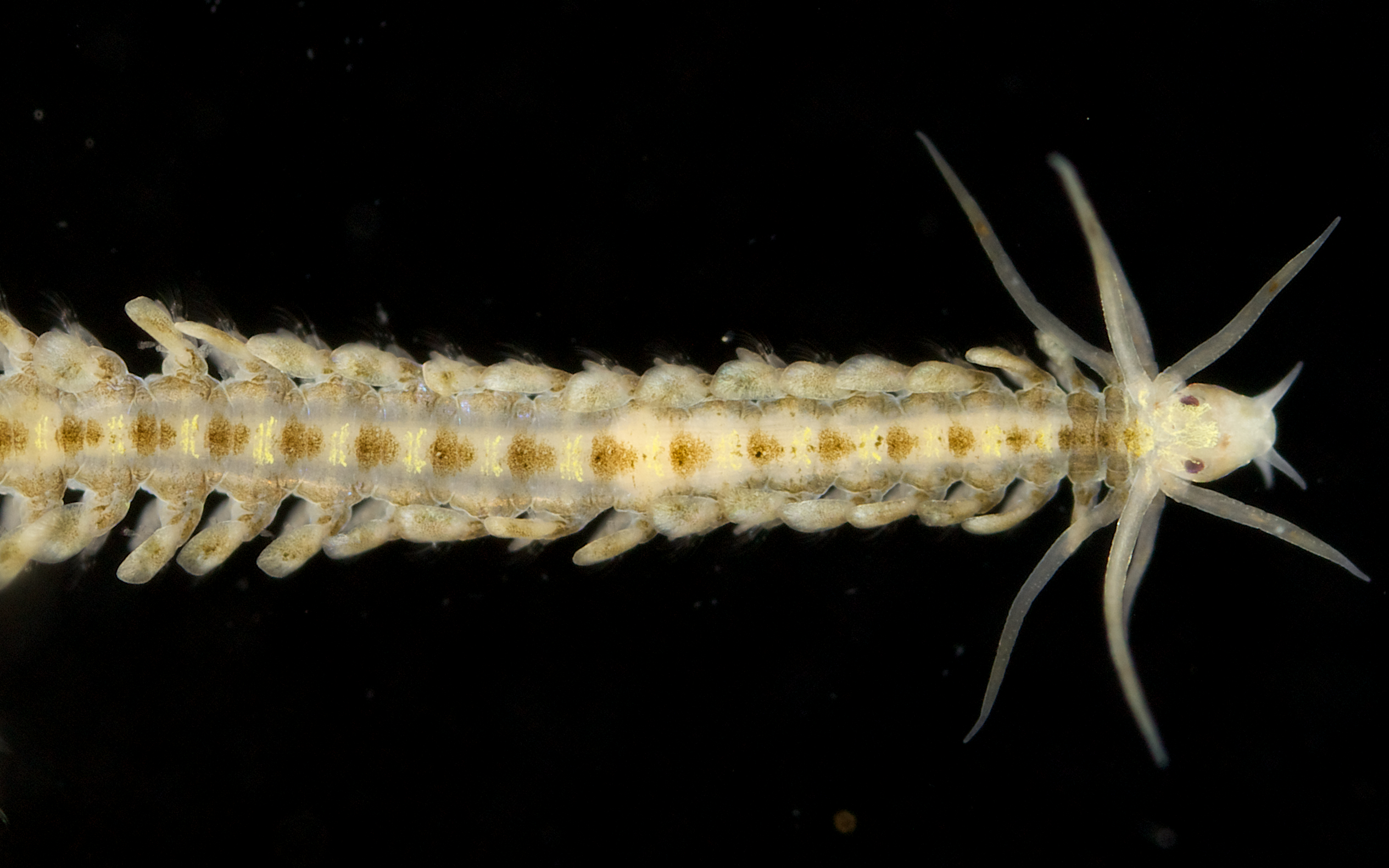

Scientific classification
- Kingdom: Animalia
- Phylum: Annelida
- Clade: Pleistoannelida
- Subclass: Errantia
- Order: Phyllodocida
- Family: Phyllodocidae
- Genus: Phyllodoce
- Species: P. maculata

Binomial name
- Phyllodoce maculata (Linnaeus, 1767)

= Phyllodoce maculata =

Species of annelid worm

Phyllodoce maculata is a species of Polychaete worm in the family Phyllodocidae. It is native to the northeastern Atlantic Ocean where it inhabits shallow water areas of sand, mud and stones.

== Description ==
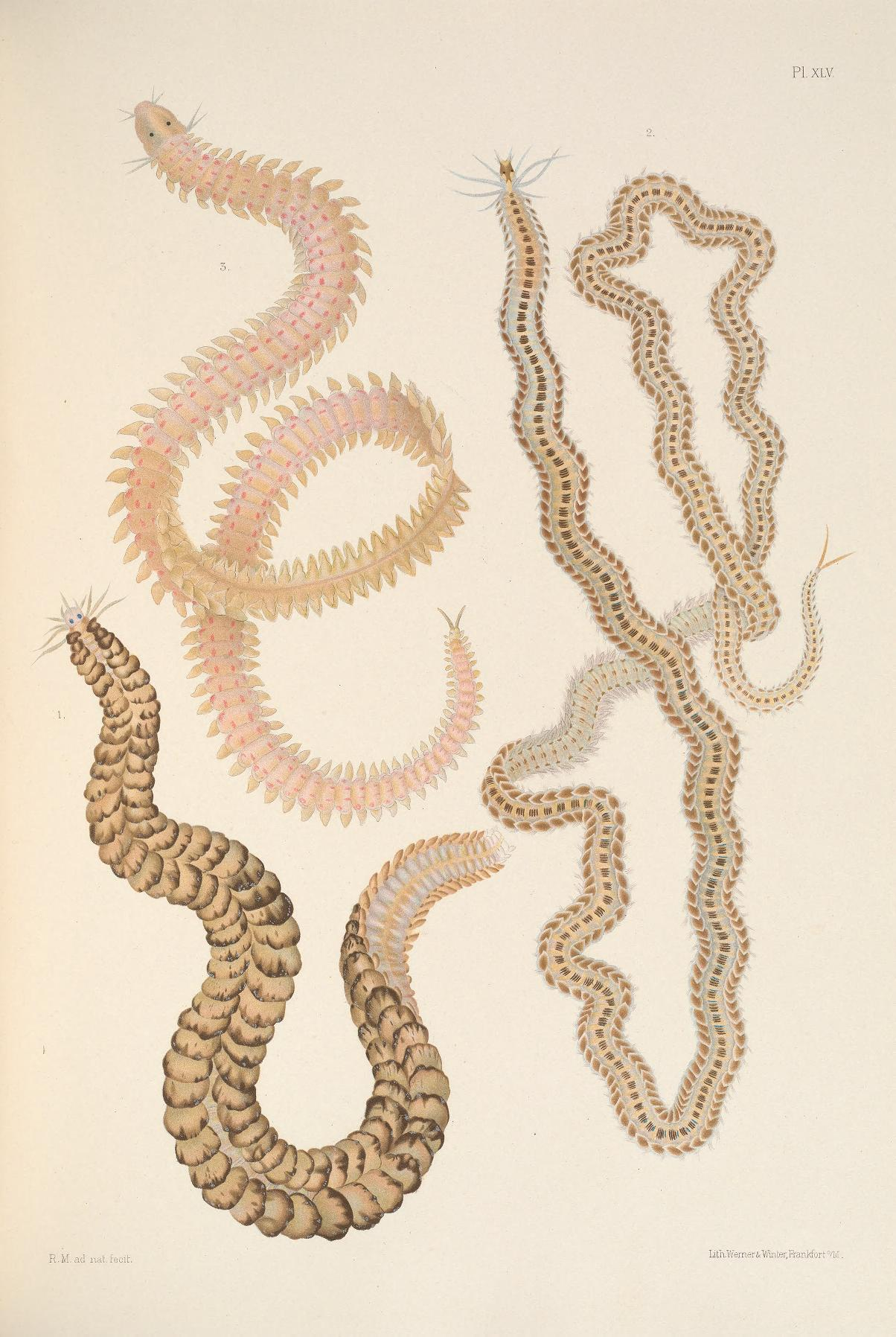
"A monograph of the British marine annelids", 1908. Phyllodoce maculata is on the right

Phyllodoce maculata is an elongated slender worm, tapering slightly towards the posterior. The prostomium (head) bears a pair of antennae, a pair of eyes, two small palps and a large eversible proboscis. The first few body segments bear four pairs of long, tentacular cirri. Other body segments bear parapodia with flattened cirri, the dorsal ones being heart-shaped and conspicuous. The prostomium, the first body segment (which cannot be seen from above) and the second segment are colourless, the third and fourth segments are dark, and the fifth and remaining segments have dark spots centred on the overlap of the segments, as well as some dark colour at the side of the segments. The posterior of the prostomium has some yellow colouring, and there are yellow spots between the dark spots on the dorsal surface of the body. This worm can have as many as 250 segments and be up to 100 mm (4 in) long.

== Distribution and habitat ==
This worm can be confused with other species, particularly the closely related Phyllodoce mucosa, so its precise range is unclear; it is present in the Arctic and North Atlantic Oceans, the Skagerrak and Kattegat, the western Baltic Sea, the North Sea and the English Channel. Its depth range is from the intertidal zone down to about 400 m (1,300 ft), and it is found on sand, muddy-sand, shelly gravel and rock bottoms.

== Biology ==
Phyllodoce maculata is a predator and scavenger, feeding on invertebrate prey and the bodies of small dead animals. During breeding, several males may sometimes be seen swarming around a female on the sediment surface, and the greenish, gelatinous egg masses produced are attached to stones or other underwater objects.
