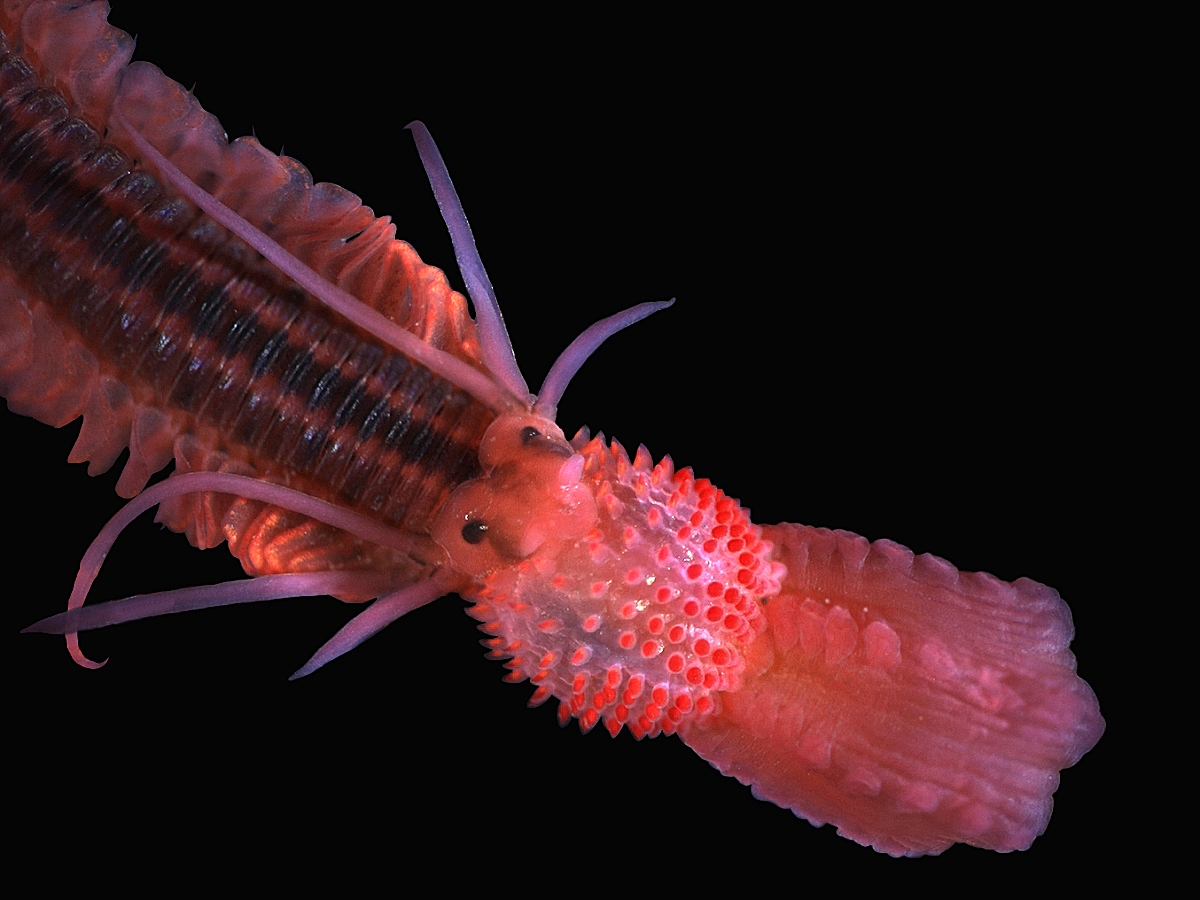
- Individual stained to show prostomium with tentacular cirri and everted proboscis

Scientific classification
- Kingdom: Animalia
- Phylum: Annelida
- Clade: Pleistoannelida
- Subclass: Errantia
- Order: Phyllodocida
- Family: Phyllodocidae
- Genus: Phyllodoce
- Species: P. lineata

Binomial name
- Phyllodoce lineata (Claparède, 1870)

Synonyms
- Anaitides lineata (Claparède, 1870); Anaitis lineata Claparède, 1870; Paranaitis lineata (Claparède, 1870); Phyllodoce callirhynchus Michaelsen, 1897; Phyllodoce papulosa Saint-Joseph, 1898

= Phyllodoce lineata =

Species of annelid worm

Phyllodoce lineata is a species of polychaete worm in the family Phyllodocidae. It is native to the northeastern Atlantic Ocean and the Mediterranean Sea where it occurs in the intertidal and shallow sub-tidal zones on soft sediment.

== Description ==
This is a colorful, multi-segmented worm of variable length, a worm with 300 segments being about 200 mm (8 in) long. The prostomium is roughly pentagonal. Like other members of the genus, the prostomium bears two pairs of antennae, a pair of eyes and a pair of large, retractile, nuchal organs. The proboscis is eversible and is divided into two distinct parts. The proximal part of the proboscis bears about 25 longitudinal rows of tiny papillae, and the distal part bears 6 longitudinal rows of larger, knob-like protuberances, and a ring of papillae at the tip. The body is elongated and of even width, apart from a tapering tip. Long tentacle-like cirri are borne on the first 7 body segments, and fleshy paddle-like parapodia are borne on the remainder. The eyes are red and there is some dark pigmentation in front of them and along the sides of the body.

== Distribution ==
Phyllodoce lineata occurs in the northeastern Atlantic Ocean, its range including the North Sea, the west coast of Scotland and Ireland, the Bay of Biscay, the Iberian peninsula and the Mediterranean Sea. It is found in the intertidal and shallow sub-tidal zones on sandy and muddy substrates.

== Ecology ==
A predator and scavenger, P. lineata feeds mostly on other polychaete worms. The sexes are separate and fertilisation is external. Eggs typically hatch into trochophore larvae, which are planktonic, and when sufficiently developed, undergo metamorphosis into segmented juveniles.
