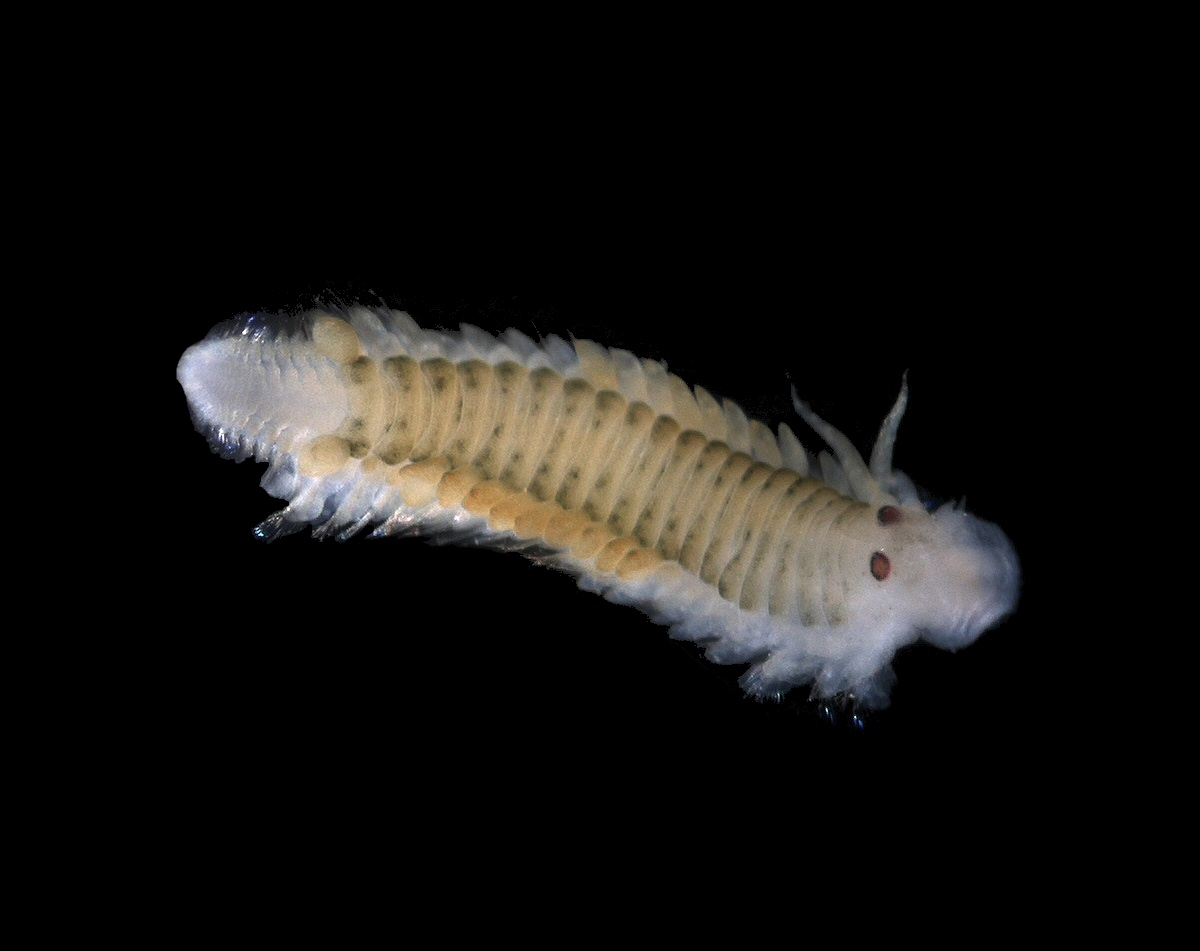
- Eumida sanguinea

Scientific classification
- Kingdom: Animalia
- Phylum: Annelida
- Clade: Pleistoannelida
- Subclass: Errantia
- Order: Phyllodocida
- Family: Phyllodocidae
- Subfamily: Eteoninae
- Genus: Eumida; Malmgren, 1865

= Eumida =

Genus of polychaetes

Eumida is a genus of polychaetes belonging to the family Phyllodocidae.

The genus has cosmopolitan distribution.

Species:

- Eumida albopicta (Marenzeller, 1879)
- Eumida alkyone Nygren & Pleijel, 2010
- Eumida alvini Eibye-Jacobsen, 1991
- Eumida angolensis Böggemann, 2009
- Eumida arctica (Annenkova, 1946)
- Eumida asterope Nygren & Pleijel, 2010
- Eumida bahusiensis Bergstrom, 1914
- Eumida caspersi Hartmann-Schröder, 1965
- Eumida delicata Oliveira, Eibye-Jacobsen & Lana, 2015
- Eumida dracodermica Oliveira, Eibye-Jacobsen & Lana, 2015
- Eumida elektra Nygren & Pleijel, 2010
- Eumida fenwicki
- Eumida fuscoculata Eibye-Jacobsen, 1991
- Eumida hawksburyensis Eibye-Jacobsen, 1991
- Eumida kelaino Nygren & Pleijel, 2010
- Eumida longicirrata Hartmann-Schröder, 1975
- Eumida longicornuta (Moore, 1906)
- Eumida mackiei Teixeira, Vieira, Pleijel et al., 2019
- Eumida macrophthalma Oliveira, Eibye-Jacobsen & Lana, 2015
- Eumida maia Nygren & Pleijel, 2010
- Eumida merope Nygren & Pleijel, 2010
- Eumida minuta (Grube, 1880)
- Eumida muriatica Eibye-Jacobsen, 1991
- Eumida notata (Langerhans, 1880)
- Eumida nuchala (Uschakov, 1972)
- Eumida ockelmanni Eibye-Jacobsen, 1987
- Eumida ophiuricola Britayev, Doignon & Eeckhaut, 1999
- Eumida parva (Saint-Joseph, 1888)
- Eumida punctifera (Grube, 1860)
- Eumida quadrocula (Haswell, 1886)
- Eumida sanguinea (Örsted, 1843)
- Eumida schanderi
- Eumida strigata (Ehlers, 1901)
- Eumida taygete Nygren & Pleijel, 2010
- Eumida thunbergi
- Eumida trifasciata Eibye-Jacobsen, 1991
- Eumida tubiformis Moore, 1909
- Eumida uschakovi Kudenov, 1979
