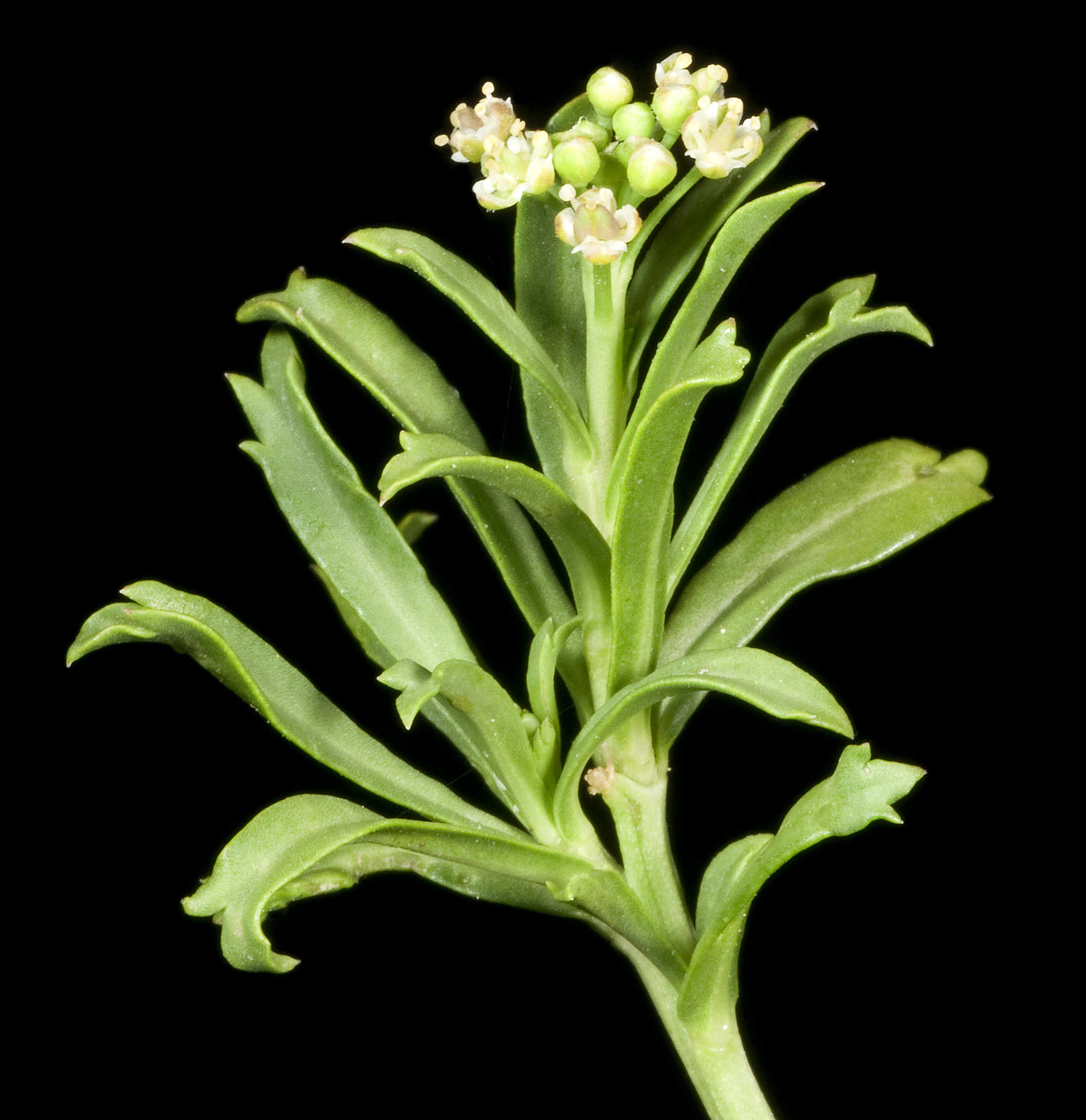

Scientific classification
- Kingdom: Plantae
- Clade: Tracheophytes
- Clade: Angiosperms
- Clade: Eudicots
- Clade: Rosids
- Order: Brassicales
- Family: Brassicaceae
- Genus: Lepidium
- Species: L. foliosum

Binomial name
- Lepidium foliosum Desv.

= Lepidium foliosum =

Species of shrub

Lepidium foliosum, commonly known as leafy peppercress, is a shrubby species of plant found in southern regions of Australia, usually close to the coast. The herbaceous species is shrubby in form, with hairless leaves and stem, and resembles others plants of the mustard family Brassicaceae.

== Taxonomy ==
First examined in Europe by the French botanist Nicaise Auguste Desvaux, a description of the species was published in 1815.

== Description ==
A species of Lepidium, with white flowers that appear around May. The height of the shrub-like perennial is most often recorded as 15–30 cm, but may reach up to one metre. Leaves are only persistent the stem, glabrous and with a form that is triangular or rounded and lanceolate or obovate. Flowers are presented in a corymbose arrangement, this inflorescence becomes extended through the flowering period.

== Distribution and habitat ==
A coastal favouring species which grows on sand, Lepidium foliosum occurs at soils over granitic or sandstone outcrops.

The distribution range includes southern regional coast of the states of Western Australia, where it is well represented in the Southwest Australia regions, and South Australia and Victoria, it also occurs on the island of Tasmania. The previously recorded extension of this range once included New South Wales, the species is now recorded as extinct in that eastern state of Australia.
