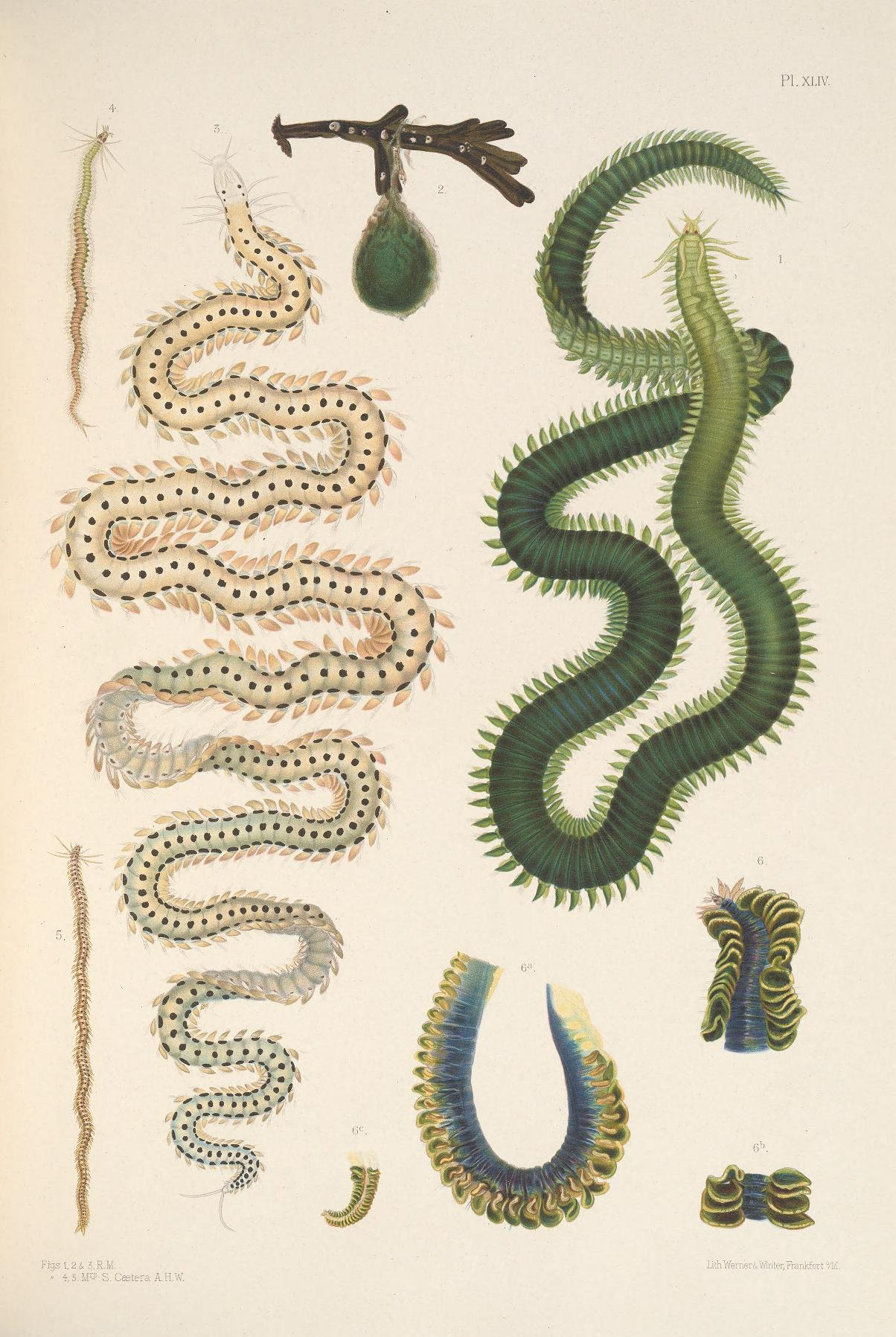
- Eumida sanguinea, Eulalia tripunctata Eulalia viridis, Nereiphylla paretti

Scientific classification
- Domain: Eukaryota
- Kingdom: Animalia
- Phylum: Annelida
- Clade: Pleistoannelida
- Subclass: Errantia
- Order: Phyllodocida
- Family: Phyllodocidae
- Subfamily: Eteoninae
- Genus: Eulalia; Savigny, 1822

Type species
- Eulalia viridis (Linnaeus, 1767)

Species
- See text

= Eulalia (annelid) =

Genus of annelids

Eulalia is a genus of polychaete worms.

== Species ==
The World Register of Marine Species includes the following species in the genus :

- Eulalia anoculata Hartman & Fauchald, 1971
- Eulalia artica Annenkova, 1946
- Eulalia aurea Gravier, 1896
- Eulalia austrophylliformis Uschakov, 1972
- Eulalia bilineata (Johnston, 1840)
- Eulalia brevicornis (Moore, 1894)
- Eulalia brunnea (Hartmann-Schröder, 1963)
- Eulalia clavigera (Audouin & Milne Edwards, 1833)
- Eulalia dubia Webster & Benedict, 1884
- Eulalia ellipsis (Dalyell, 1853)
- Eulalia eos Michaelsen, 1897
- Eulalia expusilla Pleijel, 1987
- Eulalia gemina Kato & Mawatari, 2001
- Eulalia gracilior (Chamberlin, 1919)
- Eulalia gravieri Uschakov, 1972
- Eulalia hanssoni Pleijel, 1987
- Eulalia havaica Kinberg, 1866
- Eulalia hutchinsonensis (Perkins, 1984)
- Eulalia impostii Quatrefages, 1865
- Eulalia incompleta Quatrefages, 1866
- Eulalia lanceolata Hartmann-Schröder, 1981
- Eulalia lapsus Pleijel, 1991
- Eulalia levicornuta Moore, 1909
- Eulalia lobocephala Schmarda, 1861
- Eulalia lobulata Moore, 1894
- Eulalia longocirrata Støp-Bowitz, 1948
- Eulalia magalaensis Kinberg, 1866
- Eulalia megalops Verrill, 1900
- Eulalia meniceros Pruvot, 1883
- Eulalia meteorensis Böggemann, 2009
- Eulalia mexicana Fauchald, 1972
- Eulalia microoculata Pleijel, 1987
- Eulalia microphylla Schmarda, 1861
- Eulalia mucosa Quatrefages, 1866
- Eulalia mustela Pleijel, 1987
- Eulalia myriacyclum (Schmarda, 1861)
- Eulalia novaezelandiae (Grube, 1880)
- Eulalia ornata Saint-Joseph, 1888
- Eulalia pachycirra Hartman, 1978
- Eulalia pacifica (Imajima, 1964)
- Eulalia personata Gravier, 1907
- Eulalia pulchra Langerhans, 1884
- Eulalia pusilla Ørstedt, 1843
- Eulalia quadricornis Örsted, 1843
- Eulalia quadrioculata Moore, 1906
- Eulalia rubiginosa Saint-Joseph, 1888
- Eulalia sandwichensis Uschakov, 1975
- Eulalia saxicola Quatrefages, 1866
- Eulalia semenovi Averincev, 1972
- Eulalia sigeformis Annenkova, 1937
- Eulalia subulifera Ehlers, 1897
- Eulalia tenax (Grube, 1878)
- Eulalia thileniusi Augener, 1927
- Eulalia tjalfiensis Ditlevsen, 1917
- Eulalia trilineata de Saint-Joseph, 1888
- Eulalia tripunctata McIntosh, 1874
- Eulalia varia Ehlers, 1908
- Eulalia venusta de Saint Joseph, 1888
- Eulalia viridis (Linnaeus, 1767)
