= Epilobium foliosum =

Scientific classification
- Kingdom: Plantae
- Clade: Embryophytes
- Clade: Tracheophytes
- Clade: Spermatophytes
- Clade: Angiosperms
- Clade: Eudicots
- Clade: Rosids
- Order: Myrtales
- Family: Onagraceae
- Genus: Epilobium
- Species: E. foliosum

Binomial name
- Epilobium foliosum (Torr. & A.Gray) Suksd.

Species of flowering plant

Epilobium foliosum is a species of flowering plant in the evening primrose family known by the common names leafy willowherb and California willowherb. It is native to parts of western North America from British Columbia through California to Arizona, where it grows in many types of habitat, including disturbed areas.

Epilobium foliosum is an annual herb producing a thin, spindly stem approaching 40 centimeters (16 in) in height. The linear to lance-shaped leaves are up to 3 centimeters long, sometimes folded longitudinally and borne alternately or in clusters. The inflorescence is an open raceme of flowers, each with four small white petals which are notched at the tip, sometimes deeply. Each petal is only 2 or 3 millimeters long. The fruit is a slightly hairy capsule up to 2 centimeters in length.
