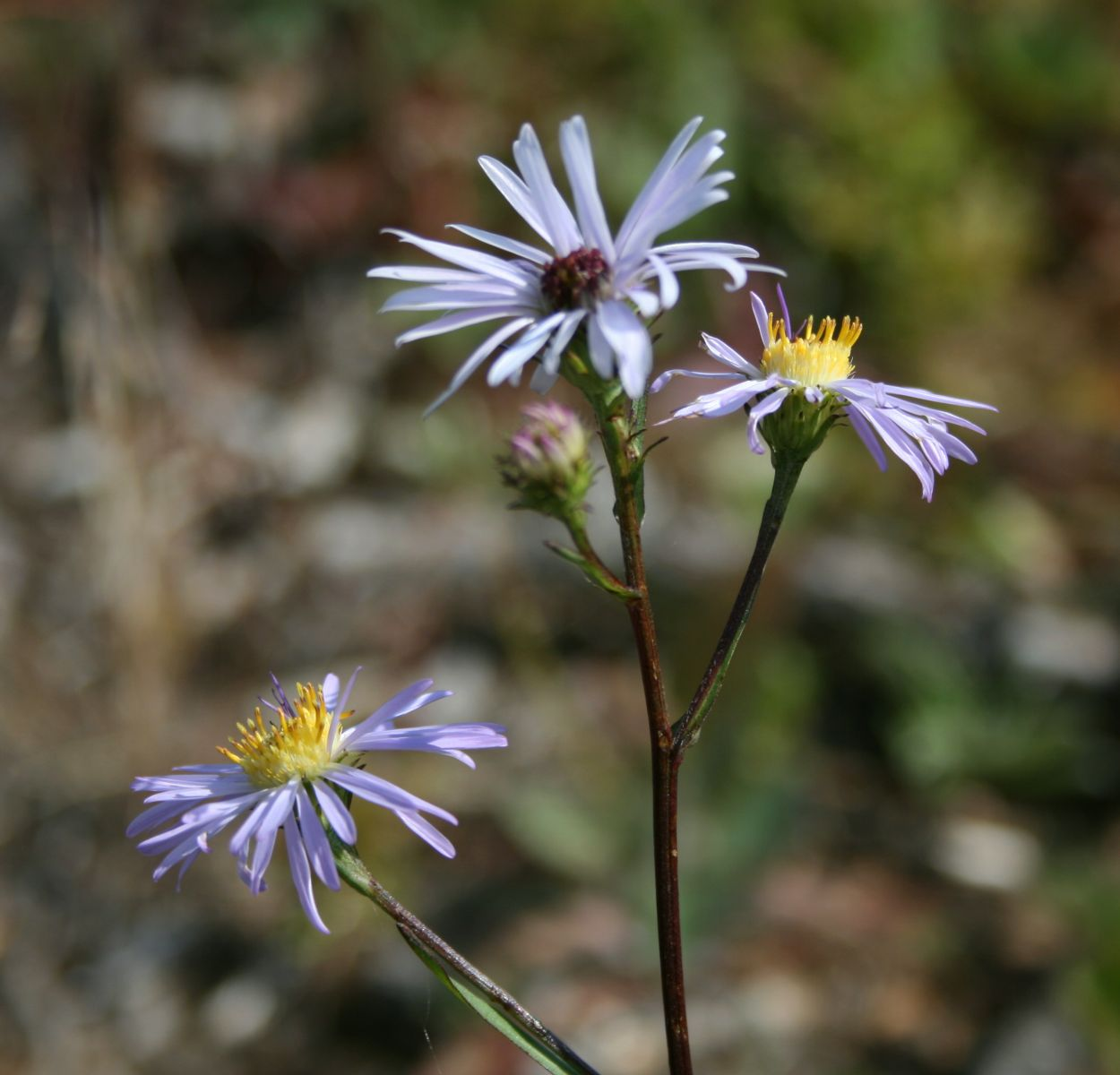
- British Columbia

Conservation status
- Secure (NatureServe)

Scientific classification
- Kingdom: Plantae
- Clade: Tracheophytes
- Clade: Angiosperms
- Clade: Eudicots
- Clade: Asterids
- Order: Asterales
- Family: Asteraceae
- Genus: Symphyotrichum
- Subgenus: Symphyotrichum subg. Symphyotrichum
- Section: Symphyotrichum sect. Occidentales
- Species: S. foliaceum

Binomial name
- Symphyotrichum foliaceum (Lindl. ex DC.) G.L.Nesom

Varieties
- List: S. foliaceum var. foliaceum; S. foliaceum var. apricum (A.Gray) G.L.Nesom; S. foliaceum var. canbyi (A.Gray) G.L.Nesom; S. foliaceum var. cusickii (A.Gray) G.L.Nesom; S. foliaceum var. parryi (D.C.Eaton) G.L.Nesom
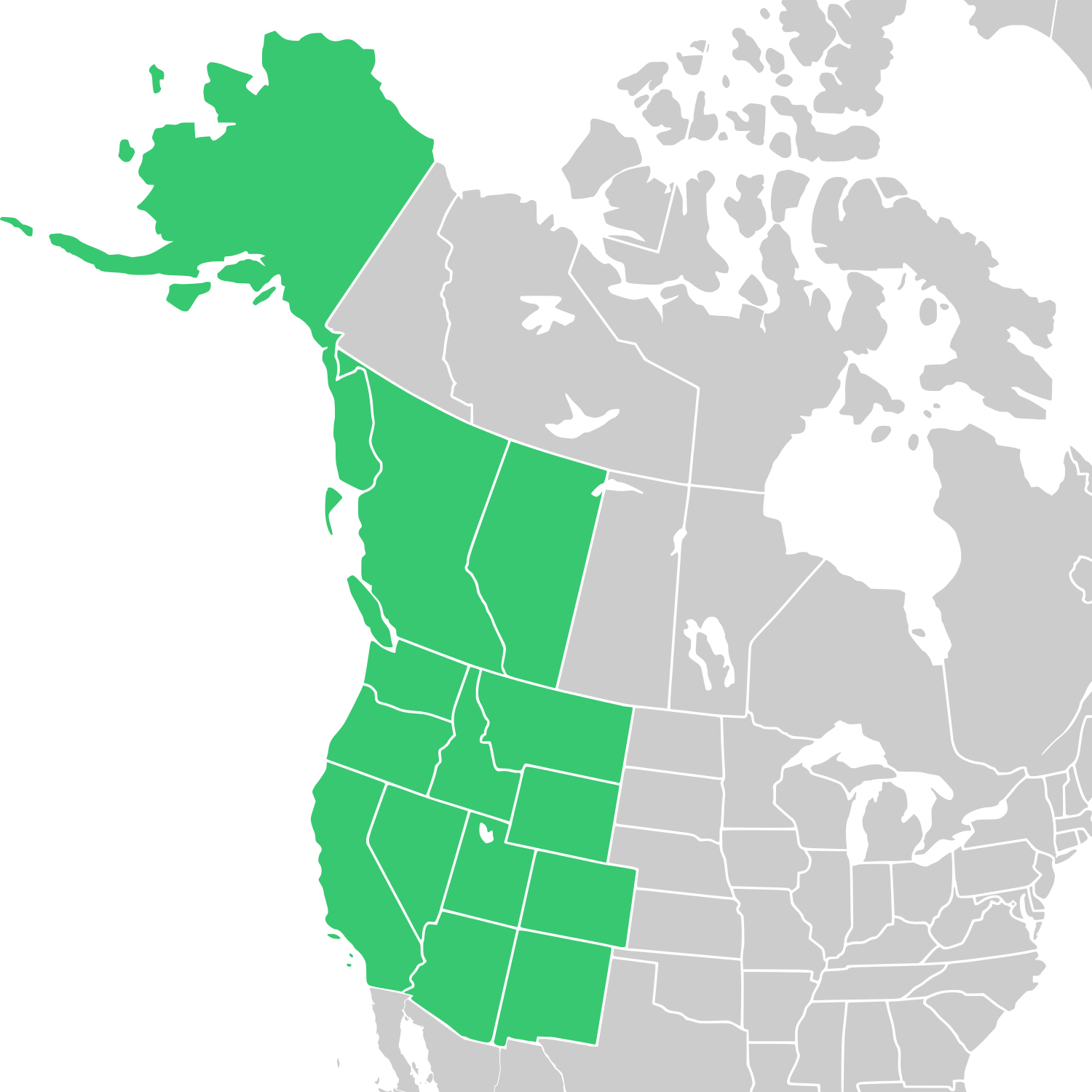
- Native distribution

Synonyms
- Basionym: Aster foliaceus Lindl. ex DC.; Varieties: var. foliaceum; Aster botryanthus K.Koch; Aster canbyi Vasey ex A.Gray; Aster douglasii D.C.Eaton; Aster foliaceus var. diabolicus Onno; Aster foliaceus var. typicus Onno; Aster peregrinus Less.; var. apricum; Aster apricus Rydb.; Aster foliaceus subsp. apricus (A.Gray) Piper; Aster foliaceus var. apricus A.Gray; Aster phyllodes Rydb.; Aster subspicatus var. apricus (A.Gray) B.Boivin; Aster tweedyi Rydb.; var. canbyi; Aster foliaceus var. burkei A.Gray; Aster foliaceus var. canbyi A.Gray; var. cusickii; Aster cusickii A.Gray; Aster cusickii var. lyallii A.Gray; Aster foliaceus var. cusickii (A.Gray) Cronquist; Aster foliaceus var. lyallii (A.Gray) Cronquist; Aster kootenayi A.Nelson & J.F.Macbr.; Symphyotrichum cusickii (A.Gray) G.L.Nesom; var. parryi; Aster ascendens var. parryi D.C.Eaton; Aster diabolicus Piper; Aster foliaceus var. frondeus A.Gray; Aster foliaceus subsp. frondeus (A.Gray) Piper; Aster foliaceus var. parryi A.Gray; Aster frondeus Greene

= Symphyotrichum foliaceum =

Species of flowering plant

Symphyotrichum foliaceum (formerly Aster foliaceus) is a species of flowering plant in the family Asteraceae native to western North America. Its common names are leafy aster, leafy-bracted aster, and alpine leafybract aster, and it is a perennial, herbaceous plant that may reach heights from 10 to 60 centimeters (4 to 24 inches). Its flowers have violet to purple ray florets and yellow disk florets.

Four varieties were accepted as of July 2021 by Plants of the World Online (POWO), as follows: S. foliaceum var. apricum, S. foliaceum var. canbyi, S. foliaceum var. cusickii, and S. foliaceum var. parryi. The autonym is S. foliaceum var. foliaceum.

== Description ==
Symphyotrichum foliaceum is a perennial, herbaceous plant that may reach heights from 10 to 60 centimeters (4 to 24 inches). Its flowers have violet to purple ray florets and yellow disk florets.

== Distribution and habitat ==
The species is native to western North America. It can be found in mountainous regions with forests of conifers and in the meadows of the same.

== Conservation ==
NatureServe has given the species a global conservation status of Secure (G5). This was last reviewed 25 July 2016. In Yukon, it is Critically Imperiled (S1), and in Nevada, it is Vulnerable (S3).

== Gallery ==
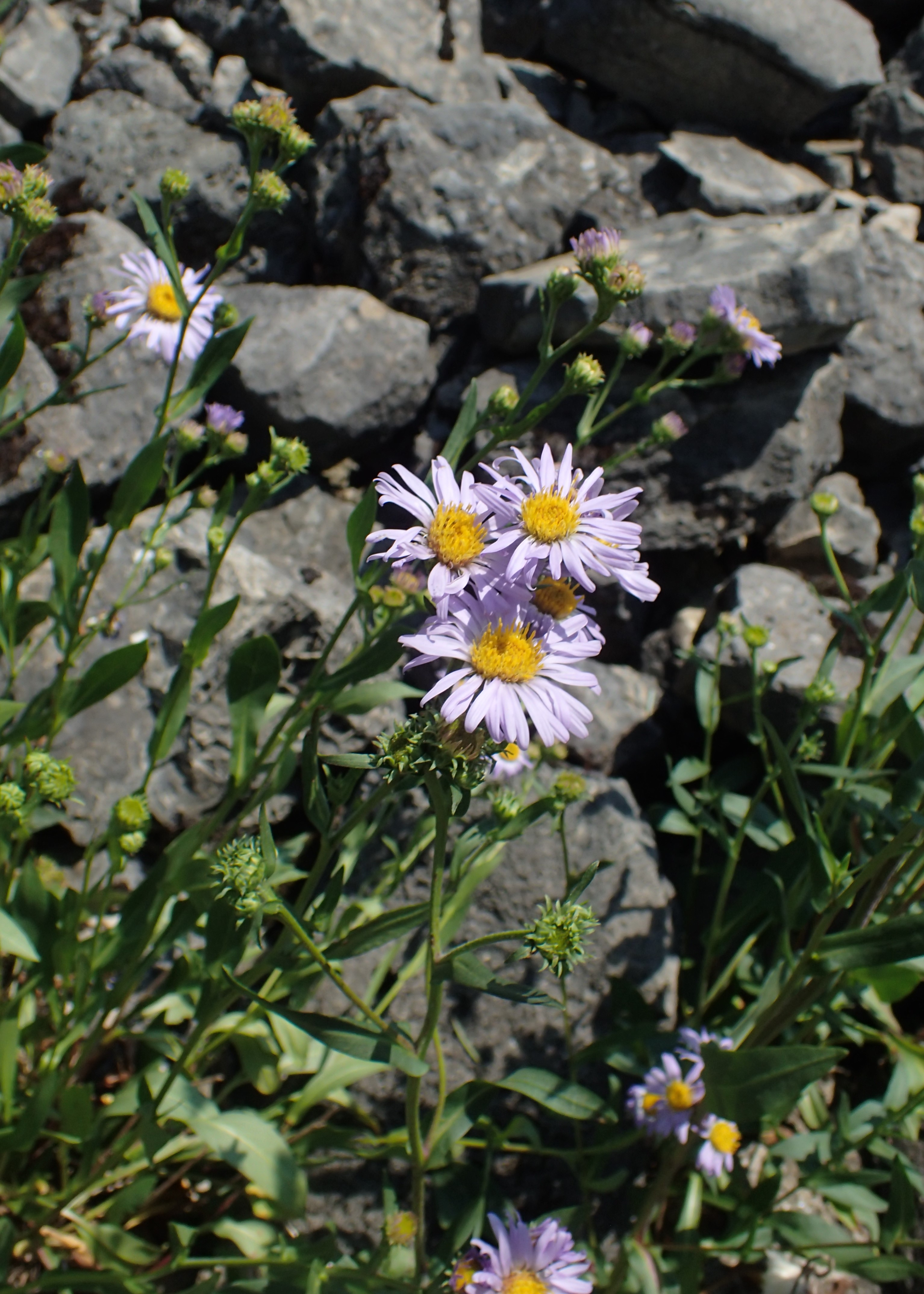
S. foliaceum var. parryi

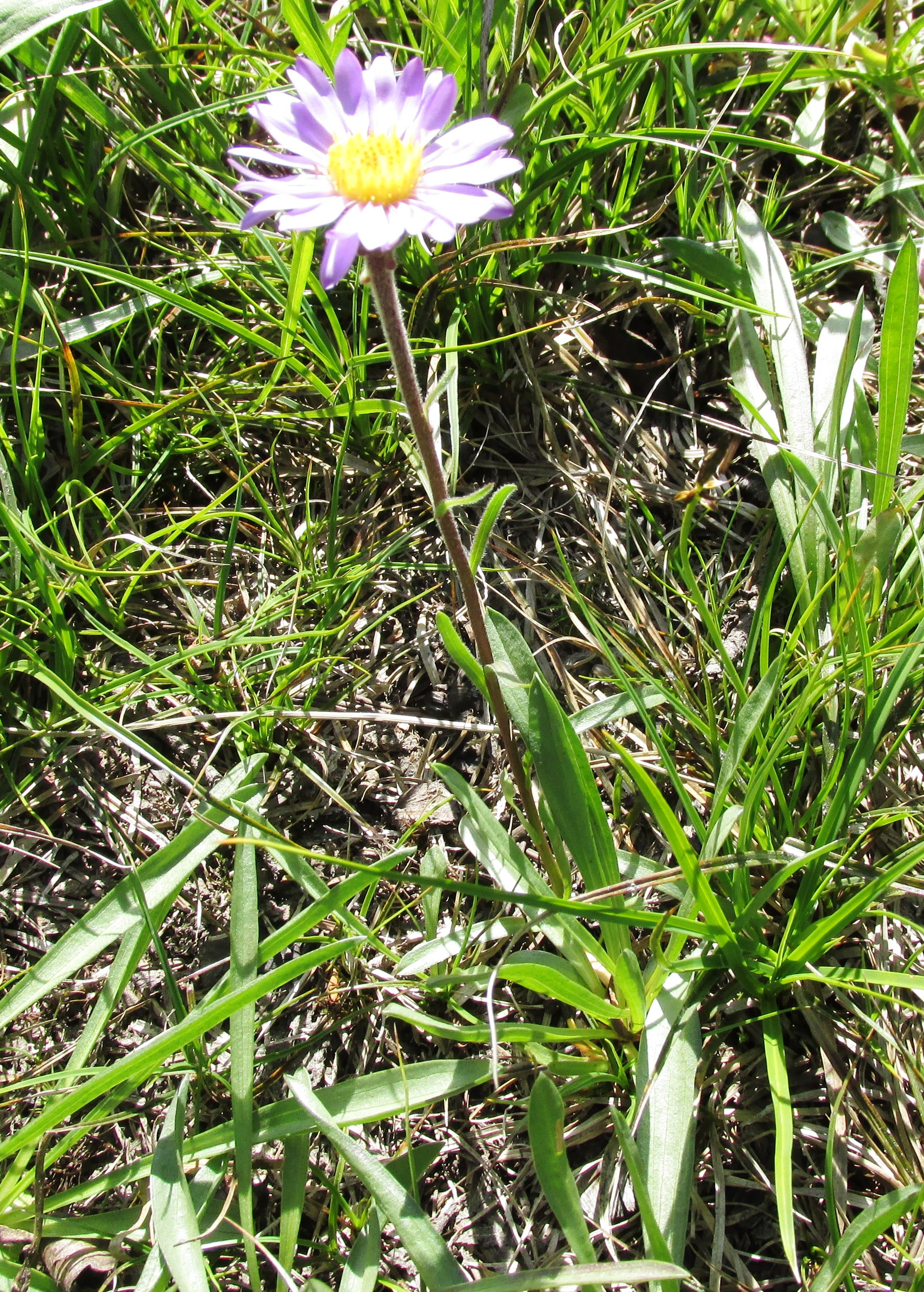
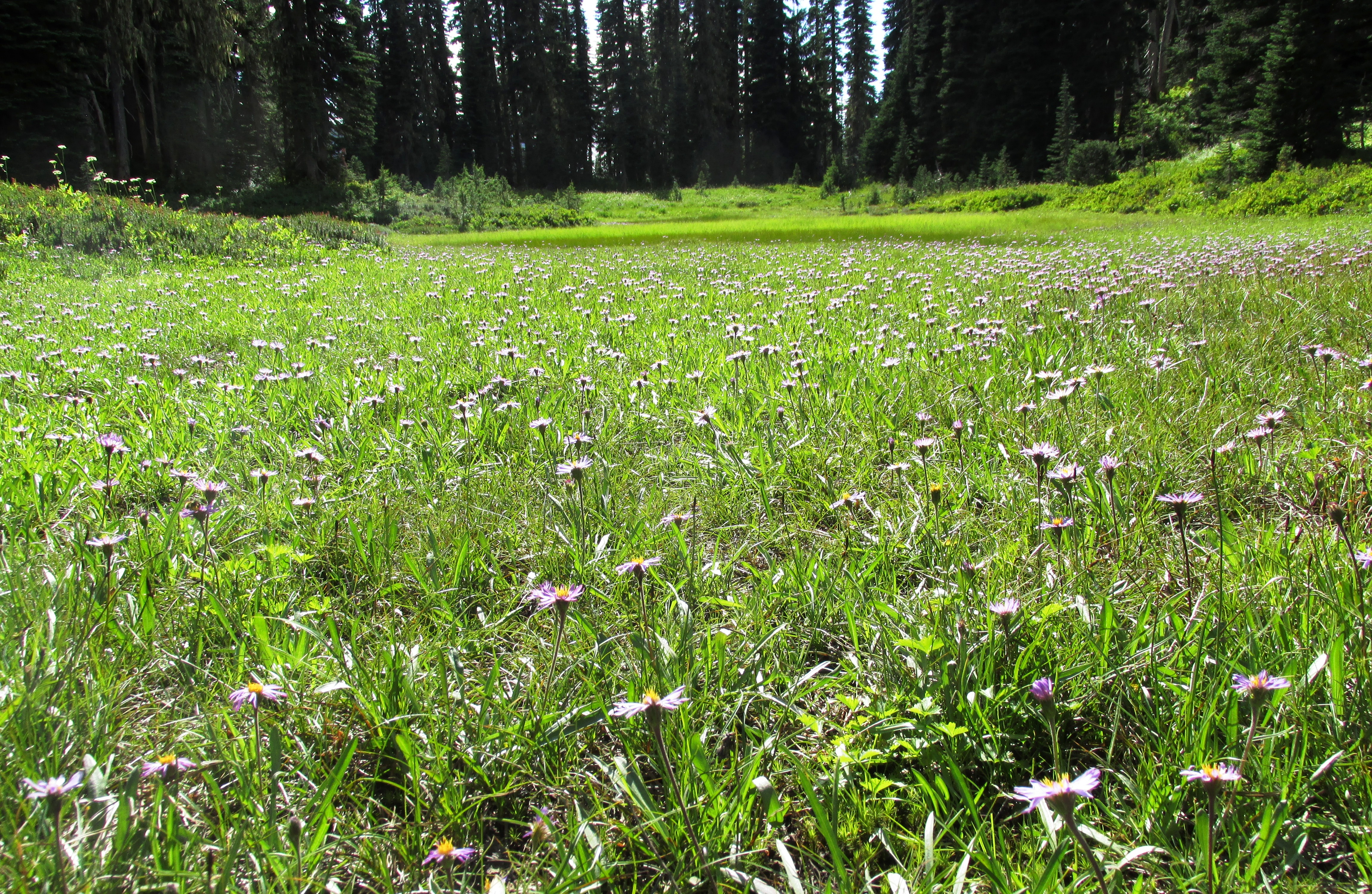
