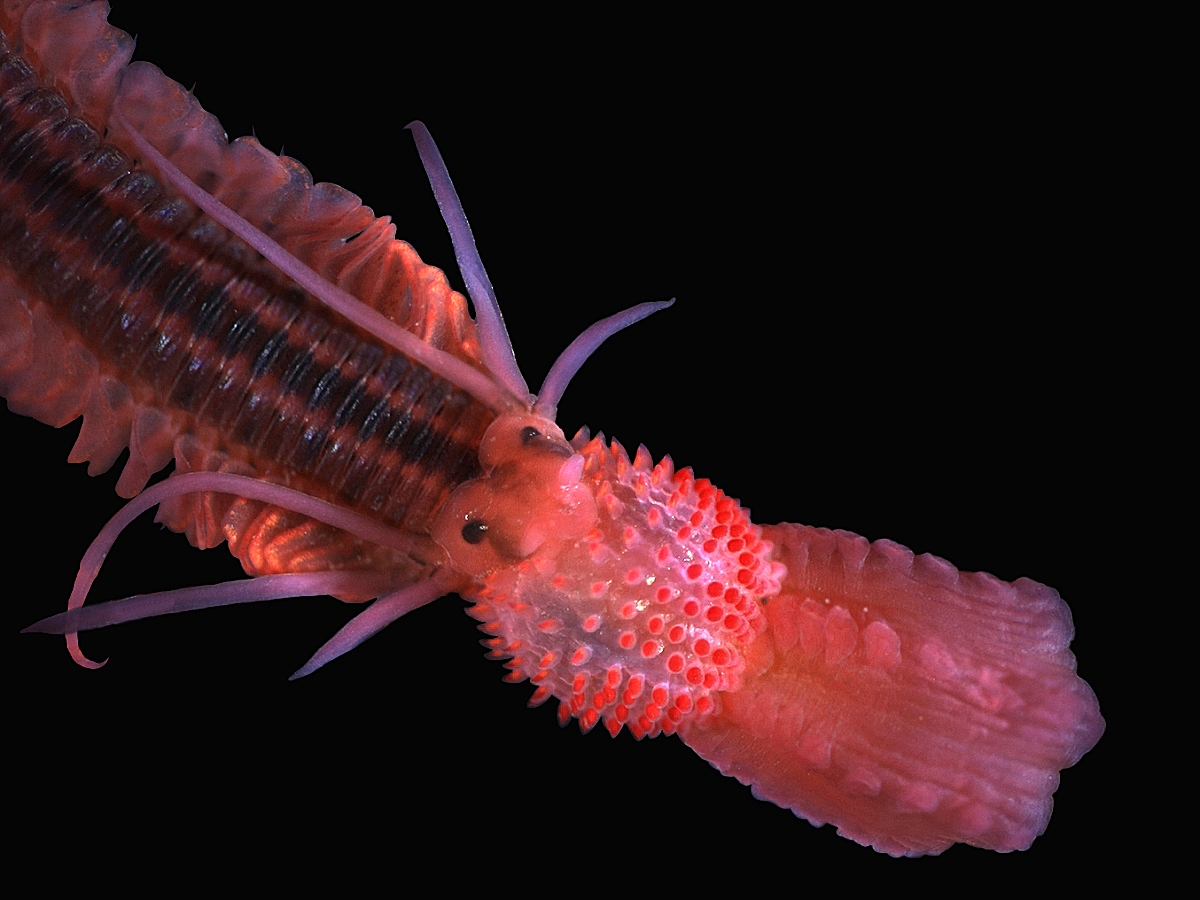
- Phyllodoce lineata with everted proboscis

Scientific classification
- Kingdom: Animalia
- Phylum: Annelida
- Clade: Pleistoannelida
- Subclass: Errantia
- Order: Phyllodocida
- Family: Phyllodocidae
- Subfamily: Phyllodocinae
- Genus: Phyllodoce; Lamarck, 1818

Type species
- Phyllodoce laminosa Savigny in Lamarck, 1818

Species
- See text

= Phyllodoce (annelid) =

Genus of annelids

Phyllodoce is a genus of polychaete worms, which contains about 200 species. The prostomium bears eyes, two pairs of antennae and a pair of large retractile nuchal organs. The eversible proboscis is clearly divided into two parts.

== Species ==
The World Register of Marine Species includes the following species in the genus :

- Phyllodoce adarensis Benham, 1927
- Phyllodoce agassizi Nolte, 1938
- Phyllodoce albovittata Grube, 1860
- Phyllodoce algerensis Nolte, 1938
- Phyllodoce arenae Webster, 1879
- Phyllodoce armigera (Blake, 1988)
- Phyllodoce australis Day, 1975
- Phyllodoce basalis (Hartmann-Schröder, 1965)
- Phyllodoce benedenii (Hansen, 1882)
- Phyllodoce berrisfordi (Hartmann-Schröder, 1974)
- Phyllodoce bimaculata Saint-Joseph, 1898
- Phyllodoce breviremis Quatrefages, 1866
- Phyllodoce bruneoviridis Saint-Joseph, 1898
- Phyllodoce bulbosa Wesenberg-Lund, 1962
- Phyllodoce callaona Grube, 1857
- Phyllodoce canariensis Nolte, 1938
- Phyllodoce capreensis Nolte, 1938
- Phyllodoce catenula Verrill, 1873
- Phyllodoce chalybeia Grube, 1880
- Phyllodoce chinensis Uschakov & Wu, 1959
- Phyllodoce citrina Malmgren, 1865
- Phyllodoce clava Carrington, 1865
- Phyllodoce colmani Day, 1949
- Phyllodoce cordifolia Johnston, 1865
- Phyllodoce cortezi (Kudenov, 1975)
- Phyllodoce costata Grube, 1850
- Phyllodoce cuspidata McCammon & Montagne, 1979
- Phyllodoce digueti Fauvel, 1943
- Phyllodoce dissotyla Willey, 1905
- Phyllodoce diversiantennata (Hartmann-Schröder, 1986)
- Phyllodoce dubia (Fauchald, 1972)
- Phyllodoce duplex McIntosh, 1885
- Phyllodoce elongata (Imajima, 1967)
- Phyllodoce erythraeensis Gravier, 1900
- Phyllodoce erythraensis Gravier, 1900
- Phyllodoce erythrophylla (Schmarda, 1861)
- Phyllodoce fakaravana Chamberlin, 1919
- Phyllodoce faroensis Nolte, 1938
- Phyllodoce ferruginea Moore, 1909
- Phyllodoce flavescens Grube, 1857
- Phyllodoce foliosopapillata Willey, 1905
- Phyllodoce fristedti Bergström, 1916
- Phyllodoce geoffroyi Audouin & Milne Edwards, 1833
- Phyllodoce gravida Gravier, 1900
- Phyllodoce griffithsii Johnston, 1865
- Phyllodoce groenlandica Örsted, 1842
- Phyllodoce hartmanae Blake & Walton, 1977
- Phyllodoce hawaiia (Hartman, 1966)
- Phyllodoce helderensis Nolte, 1938
- Phyllodoce helgolandica Nolte, 1938
- Phyllodoce heterocirrus (Chamberlin, 1919)
- Phyllodoce hiatti Hartman, 1966
- Phyllodoce impostii Audouin & Milne Edwards in Quatrefages, 1866
- Phyllodoce incisa Örsted, 1842
- Phyllodoce japonica Imajima, 1967
- Phyllodoce jeffreysii (McIntosh, 1908)
- Phyllodoce koreana (Lee & Jae, 1985)
- Phyllodoce lamelligera (Gmelin in Linnaeus, 1788)
- Phyllodoce laminosa Savigny in Lamarck, 1818
- Phyllodoce latifrons Hartmann-Schröder, 1960
- Phyllodoce lineata (Claparède, 1870)
- Phyllodoce longicirris Grube, 1857
- Phyllodoce longifrons Ben-Eliahu, 1972
- Phyllodoce longipes Kinberg, 1866
- Phyllodoce macrolepidota Schmarda, 1861
- Phyllodoce macropapillosa Saint-Joseph, 1895
- Phyllodoce macrophthalmos Grube, 1857
- Phyllodoce maculata (Linnaeus, 1767)
- Phyllodoce madeirensis Langerhans, 1880
- Phyllodoce magnaoculata Treadwell, 1901
- Phyllodoce malmgreni Gravier, 1900
- Phyllodoce marquesensis Monro, 1939
- Phyllodoce medipapillata Moore, 1909
- Phyllodoce megareme Quatrefages, 1844
- Phyllodoce melaena Monro, 1939
- Phyllodoce mernoensis Knox, 1960
- Phyllodoce minuta (Treadwell, 1937)
- Phyllodoce modesta Quatrefages, 1866
- Phyllodoce monroi (Hartman, 1964)
- Phyllodoce mucosa Örsted, 1843
- Phyllodoce multicirris Grube, 1878
- Phyllodoce multipapillata (Kravitz & Jones, 1979)
- Phyllodoce multiseriata Rioja, 1941
- Phyllodoce nana Saint-Joseph, 1906
- Phyllodoce neapolitana Nolte, 1938
- Phyllodoce nicoyensis Treadwell, 1928
- Phyllodoce noronhensis Nolte, 1938
- Phyllodoce novaehollandiae Kinberg, 1866
- Phyllodoce oerstedii Quatrefages, 1866
- Phyllodoce panamensis Treadwell, 1917
- Phyllodoce papillosa Uschakov & Wu, 1959
- Phyllodoce parva (Hartmann-Schröder, 1965)
- Phyllodoce parvula Gravier, 1907
- Phyllodoce patagonica (Kinberg, 1866)
- Phyllodoce pellucida Quatrefages, 1844
- Phyllodoce pettiboneae Blake, 1988
- Phyllodoce ponticensis Nolte, 1938
- Phyllodoce pseudopatagonica Augener, 1922
- Phyllodoce pseudoseriata Hartmann-Schröder, 1959
- Phyllodoce pulla Treadwell, 1926
- Phyllodoce punctata Schmarda, 1861
- Phyllodoce puntarenae Grube, 1857
- Phyllodoce quadraticeps Grube, 1878
- Phyllodoce rathkei Quatrefages, 1866
- Phyllodoce rosea (McIntosh, 1877)
- Phyllodoce salicifolia Augener, 1913
- Phyllodoce sanctaevincentis McIntosh, 1885
- Phyllodoce sanctijosephi Gravier, 1900
- Phyllodoce schmardaei Day, 1963
- Phyllodoce stigmata Treadwell, 1925
- Phyllodoce tahitiensis Monro, 1939
- Phyllodoce tenera Grube, 1878
- Phyllodoce tenuissima Grube, 1878
- Phyllodoce tergestinensis Nolte, 1938
- Phyllodoce tortugae Treadwell, 1917
- Phyllodoce transatlantica Blanchard in Gay, 1849
- Phyllodoce truncata (Hartmann-Schröder, 1965)
- Phyllodoce tuberculosa Kudenov, 1975
- Phyllodoce tubicola Day, 1963
- Phyllodoce undata Pruvot, 1883
- Phyllodoce varia Treadwell, 1928
- Phyllodoce variabilis (Hartmann-Schröder, 1965)
- Phyllodoce violacea Treadwell, 1926
- Phyllodoce williamsi (Hartman, 1936)
