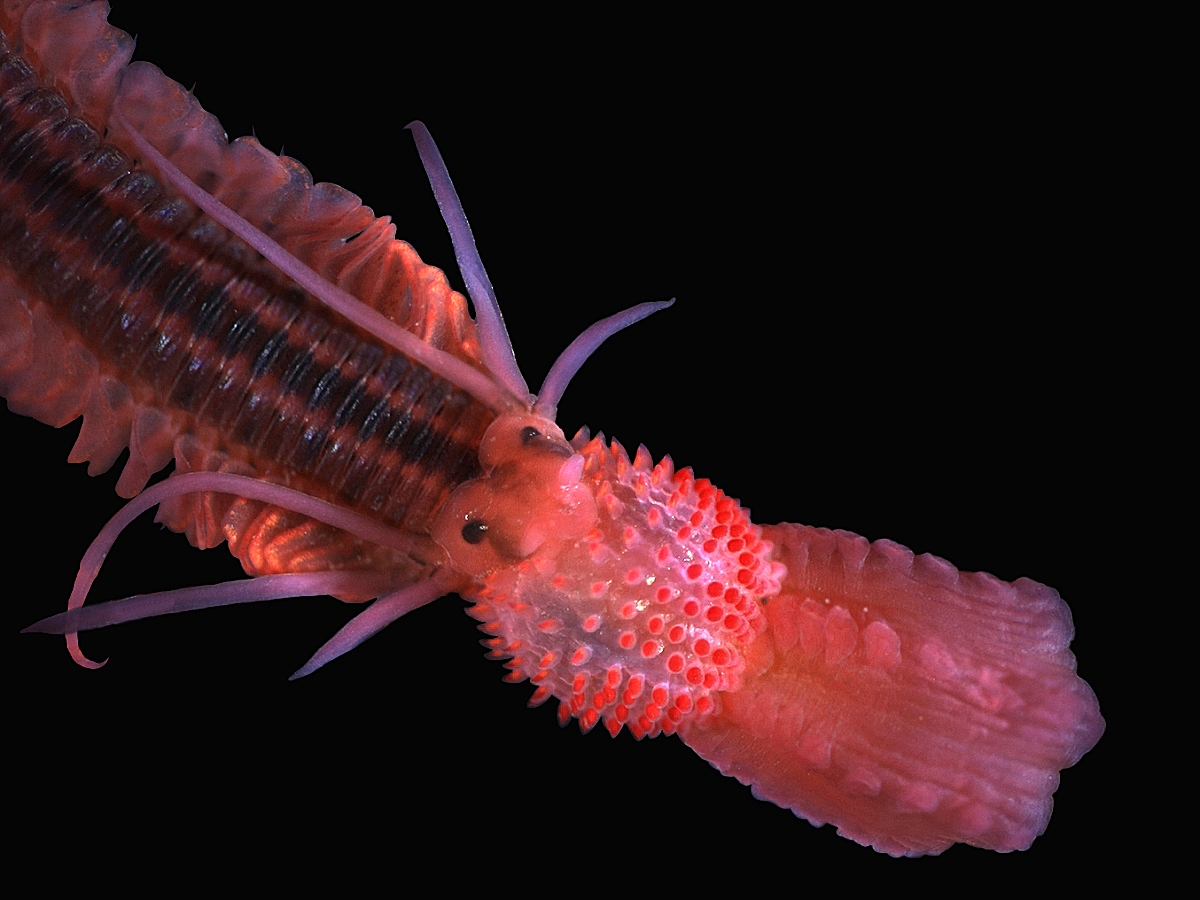
- Phyllodoce lineata with everted pharynx

Scientific classification
- Kingdom: Animalia
- Phylum: Annelida
- Clade: Pleistoannelida
- Subclass: Errantia
- Order: Phyllodocida
- Suborder: Phyllodociformia
- Family: Phyllodocidae; Ørsted, 1843

Genera
- See text

= Phyllodocidae =

Family of annelids

Phyllodocidae is a family of polychaete worms. Worms in this family live on the seabed and may burrow under the sediment.

== Characteristics ==
Members of the Phyllodocidae are characterised by an eversible pharynx and leaf-like dorsal cirri. The head has a pair of antennae at the front, a pair of ventral palps and a single median antenna known as a "nuchal papilla". There is a pair of nuchal organs and there may or may not be a pair of eyes. The first two or three body segments may be part-fused and bear up to four pairs of tentacular cirri. The remaining body segments each bear leaf-like dorsal and ventral cirri, the dorsal ones being larger. The parapodia are uniramous or biramous, and chaetae are present on all but the first segment.

== Genera ==
The World Register of Marine Species includes the following genera :

- Subfamily Eteoninae Bergström, 1914
  - Genus Eteone Savigny, 1818
  - Genus Eulalia Savigny, 1822
  - Genus Eumida Malmgren, 1865
  - Genus Galapagomystides Blake, 1985
  - Genus Hesionura Hartmann-Schröder, 1958
  - Genus Hypereteone Bergström, 1914
  - Genus Mystides Théel, 1879
  - Genus Protomystides Czerniavsky, 1882
  - Genus Pseudomystides Bergström, 1914
  - Genus Pterocirrus Claparède, 1868
  - Genus Sige Malmgren, 1865
- Subfamily Notophyllinae Pleijel, 1991
  - Genus Austrophyllum Bergström, 1914
  - Genus Clavadoce Hartman, 1936
  - Genus Nereiphylla Blainville, 1828
  - Genus Notophyllum Örsted, 1843
- Subfamily Phyllodocinae Örsted, 1843
  - Genus Chaetoparia Malmgren, 1867
  - Genus Levisettius Thompson, 1979 †
  - Genus Paranaitis Southern, 1914
  - Genus Phyllodoce Lamarck, 1818
