= List of Annelida of Ireland =

This is a list of the Annelida recorded from Ireland.

In Ireland, the number of species is:

- Class Polychaeta: 404 species
- Class Clitellata
- Subclass Oligochaeta: 179 species
- Subclass Hirudinea: 32 species

Here, the leeches and oligochaetes are placed together in the Class Clitellata. The marine Polychaeta are ranked as a Class. These groups (and the Annelida) may be monophyletic, paraphyletic, or polyphyletic. (Rouse and Pleijel, 2001).

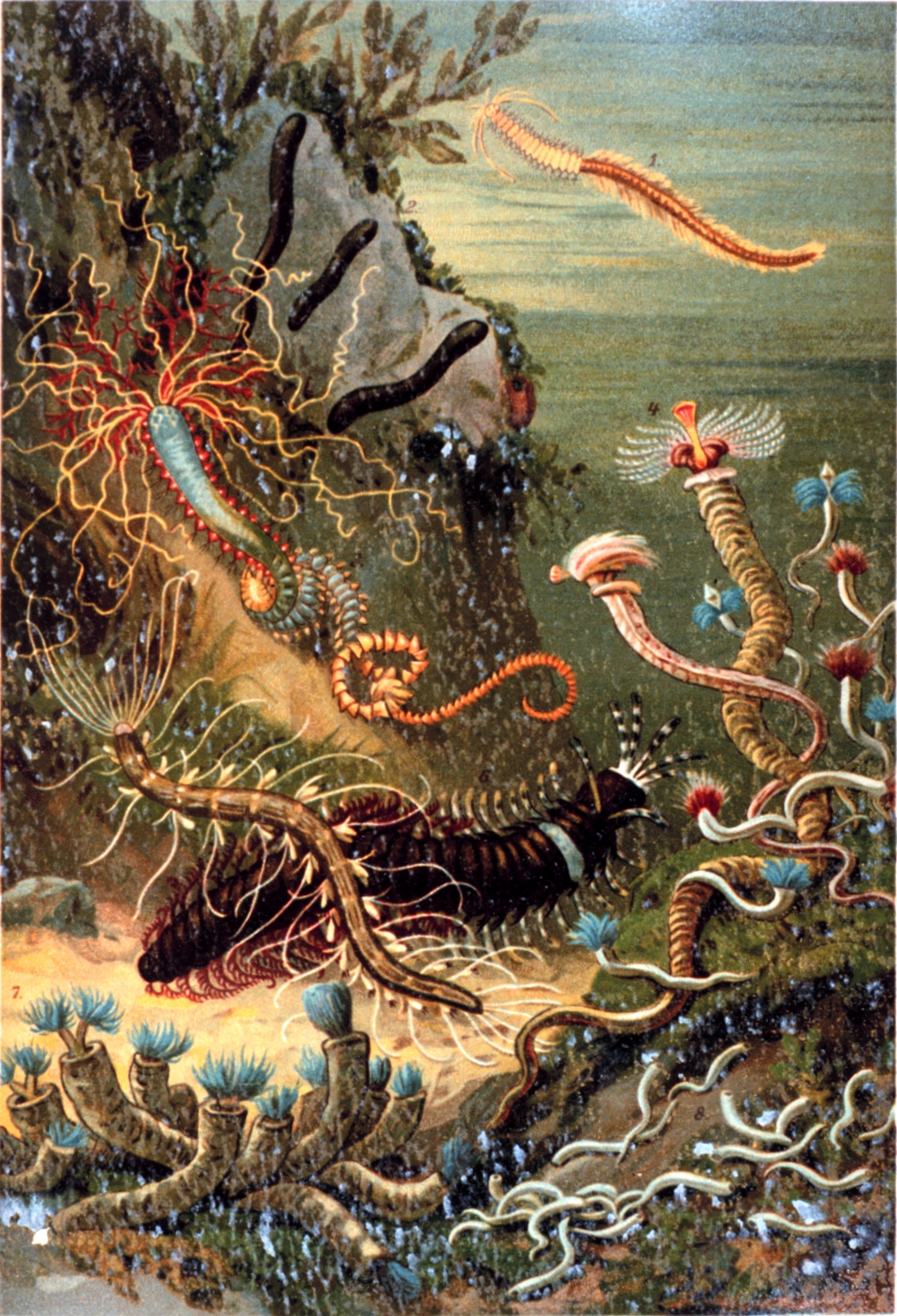
A variety of Polychaeta

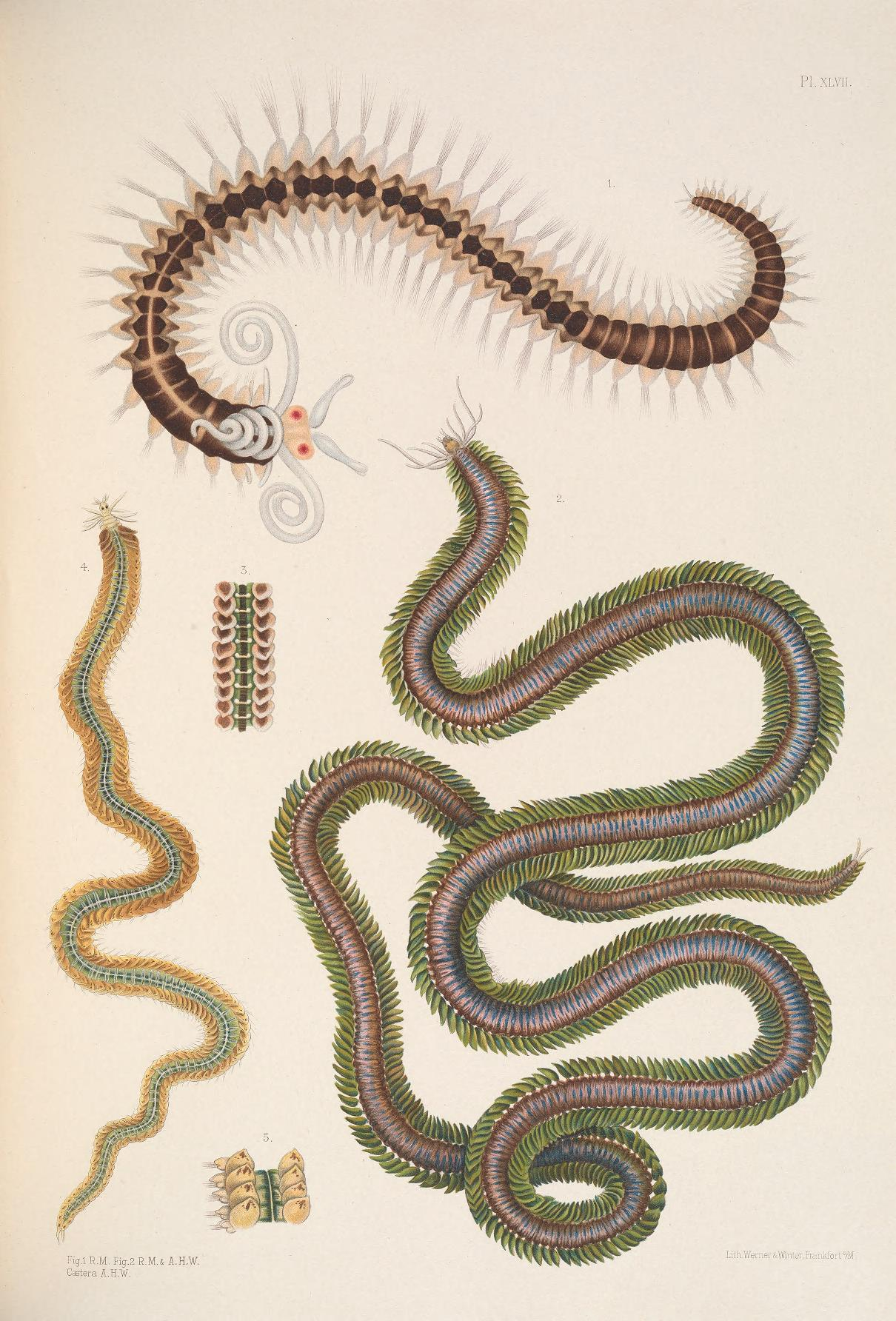
Polychaeta:1 Autolytus pictus Ehlers, 1864 Syllidae;2 Phyllodoce lamelligera (Gmelin in Linnaeus, 1788) Phyllodocidae;3 Phyllodoce maculata (Linnaeus, 1767) Phyllodocidae;4,5 Nereiphylla rubiginosa (Saint-Joseph, 1888) Phyllodocidae

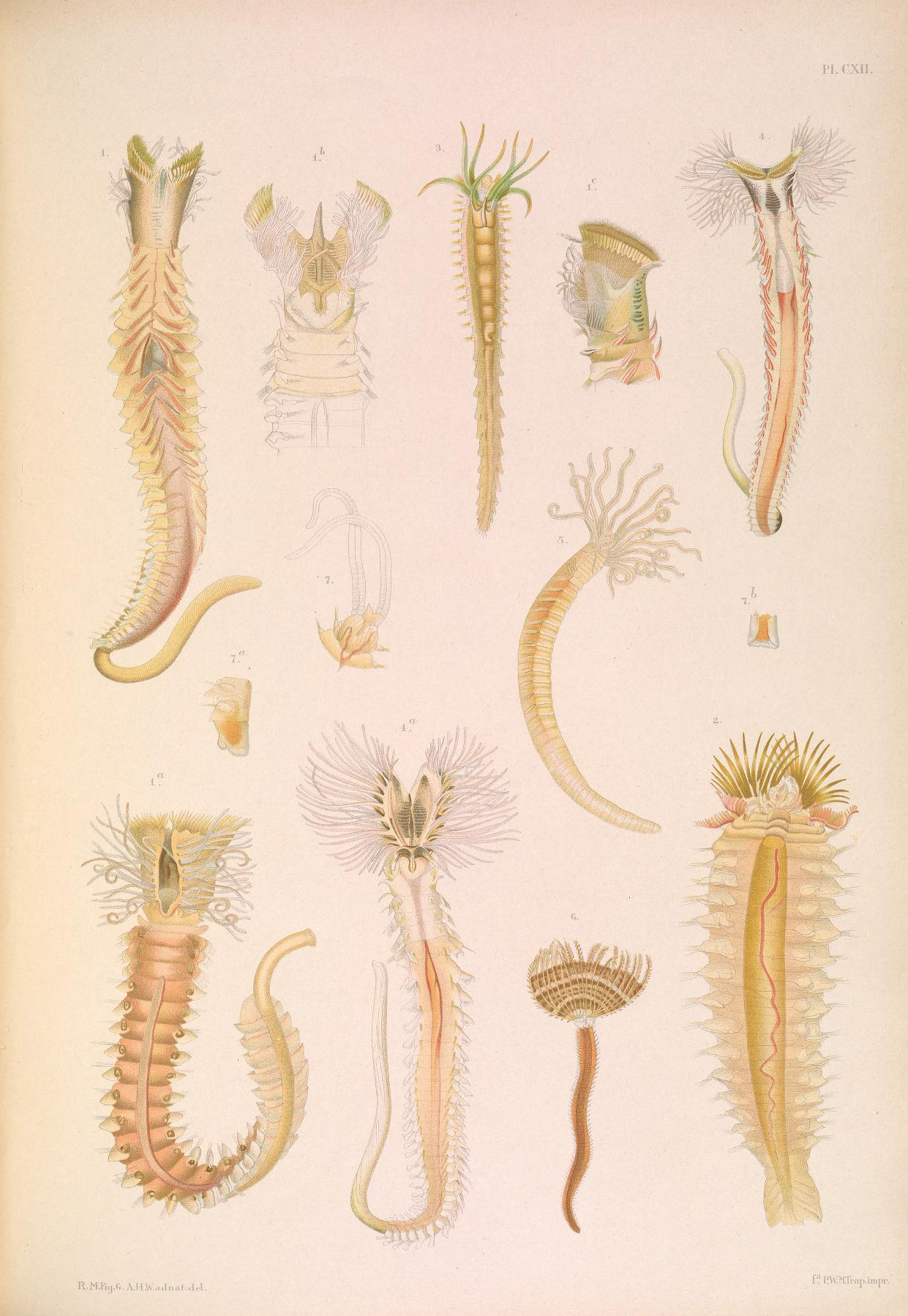
Polychaeta:1 Sabellaria spinulosa Leuckart, 1849 Sabellariidae;2 Lagis koreni Malmgren, 1866 Pectinariidae;3 Ampharete acutifrons (Grube, 1860) Ampharetidae;4 Sabellaria alveolata Linnaeus, 1767 Sabellariidae;5 Nicolea venustula (Montagu, 1819) Terebellidae;6 Branchiomma argus (Sars, 1862) Sabellidae;7 Dipolydora flava (Claparède, 1870) Spionidae

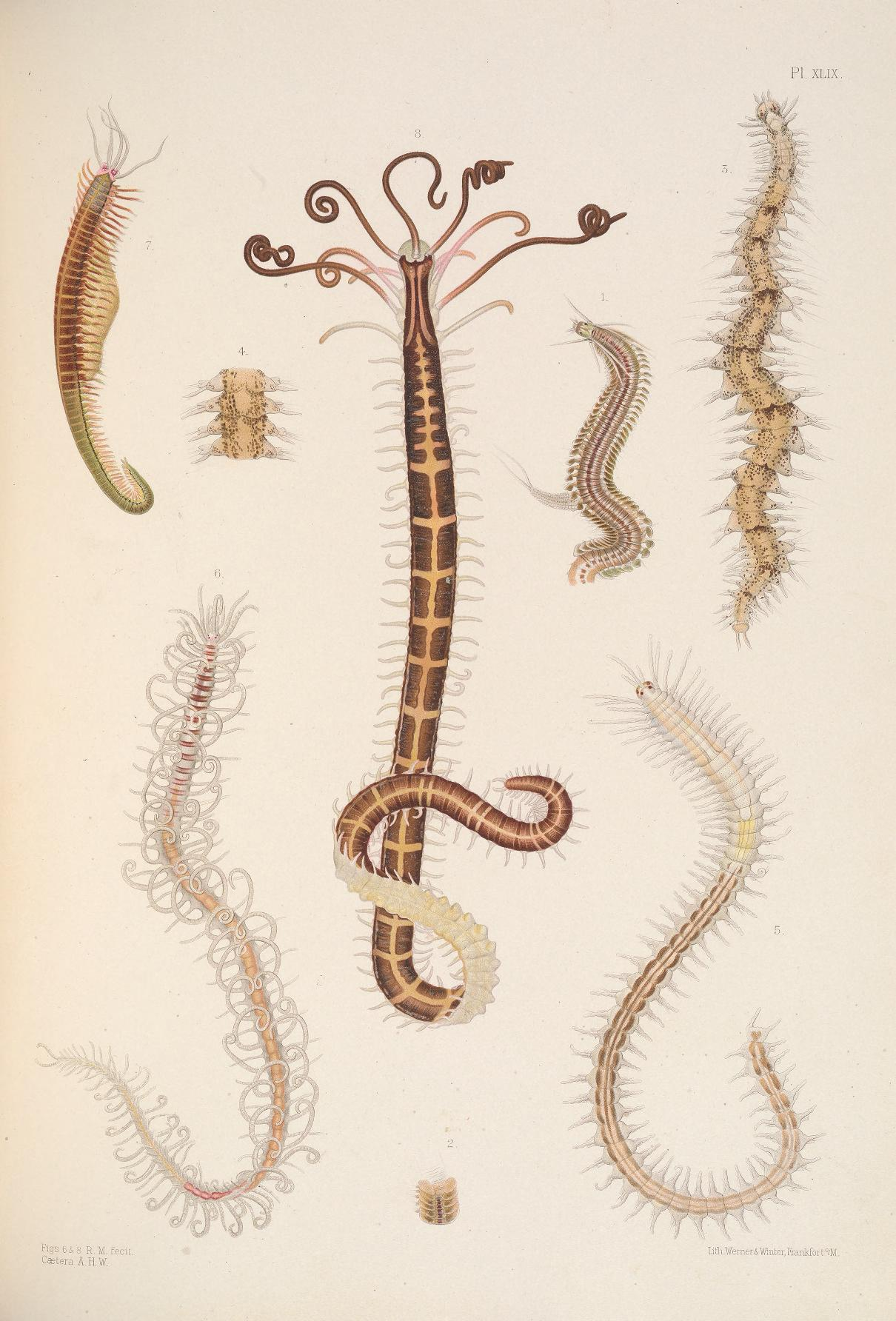
Polychaeta:*1, 2 Phyllodoce lamelligera (Gmelin in Linnaeus, 1788) Phyllodocidae;*3,4. Odontosyllis gibba (Claparède, 1863) Syllidae;*5. Odontosyllis fulgurans (Audouin & Milne Edwards, 1833) Syllidae;*6. Syllis krohnii Ehlers, 1864 Syllidae;*7. Myrianida prolifera (O.F. Müller, 1788) Syllidae;*8. Proceraea picta Ehlers, 1864 Syllidae.

== Order Phyllodocida ==
=== Family Chrysopetalidae ===
2 species

=== Family Pisionidae ===
First segment projects forward of the head. Pisione.

1 species

=== Family Aphroditidae ===
"Felt"-covered scale worms. Aphrodita, Laetmonice, Palmyra (Palmyridae)

4 species including

- Aphrodita aculeata (sea mouse)

=== Family Polynoidae ===
29 species including

- Alentia gelatinosa
- Gattyana cirrhosa
- Lepidonotus squamatus

=== Family Pholoidae ===
Minute scale worms. Dorsal scales ringed. Pholoe, Pholoides

4 species

=== Family Sigalionidae ===
Scale worms (with dorsal scales) and compound neurosetae. Sigalion, Psammolyce, Sthenelais.

8 species including

- Sigalion mathildae

=== Family Phyllodocidae ===
Active predators with leaf-like dorsal cirri, notopodia otherwise reduced. Phyllodoce, Eumida Eteone and many others.

38 species including

- Eulalia viridis
- Eteone foliosa
- Eteone longa
- Eumida sanguinea
- Hesionura elongata
- Phyllodoce lineata
- Phyllodoce maculata
- Phyllodoce rosea

=== Family Chaetopteridae ===
1 species

- Chaetopterus variopedatus

=== Family Lacydoniidae ===
A small obscure family, perhaps with hesionid affinities. Short body and proboscis unarmed. Lacydonia.

1 species

=== Family Alciopidae ===
Slender pelagic forms with giant eyes. Vanadis, Alciopa.

3 species

=== Family Lopadorrhynchidae ===
Short pelagic forms. Lopadorrhynchus.

5 species

=== Family Typhloscolecidae ===
Transparent pelagic group with tapering bodies and foliaceous segmental cirri. Sagitella, Typhloscolex, Travisiopsis.

2 species

=== Family Tomopteridae ===
Flattened pelagic forms with long cirri on segment-two. Tomopteris

2 species

=== Family Glyceridae ===
Cylindrical forms with a conical prostomium and four jaws. Glycera, Hemipodus.

1 species

- Glycera alba

=== Family Goniadidae ===
Similar to Glyceridae with the anterior parapodia uniramous, multiple jaw- pieces, and chevron structures on the proboscis. Goniada, Glycinde.

3 species

=== Family Sphaerodoridae ===
Dorsal rows of spherical tubercles. Sphaerodorum.

4 species

=== Family Hesionidae ===
10 species

=== Family Pilargidae ===
1 species

=== Family Syllidae ===
38 species including

- Haplosyllis spongicola (sponge worm)
- Sphaerosyllis levantina
- Syllis prolifera

=== Family Nereididae ===
10 species including

- Alitta succinea (cinder worm)
- Alitta virens (sandworm)
- Hediste diversicolor (ragworm)
- Platynereis dumerilii
- Eunereis longissima

=== Family Nephtyidae ===
11 species including

- Nephtys cirrosa

== Order Amphinomida ==
=== Family Amphinomidae ===
3 species

== Order Spintherida ==
=== Family Spintheridae ===
1 species

== Order Eunicida ==
=== Family Onuphidae ===
1 species

=== Family Eunicidae ===
8 species

=== Family Lumbrineridae ===
A Eunicida group lacking notopodia and with reduced or absent dorsal head appendages. Lumbrineris, Ninoe, Lysarete.

5 species

=== Family Oenonidae ===
Similar to Lumbrineridae with long maxillary carriers. Arabella, Drilonereis, Oenone.

3 species

=== Family Dorvilleidae ===
A Eunicida group with multiple jaw elements. Dorvillea, Ophryotrocha

6 species including

- Protodorvillea kefersteini

== Order Orbiniida ==
=== Family Orbiniidae ===
3 species

=== Family Paraonidae ===
Resembling Spionidae (but unrelated). With or without a single antenna, with gills, and without palps. Paraonis, Aricidea.

13 species

=== Family Apistobranchidae ===
1 species

=== Family Poecilochaetidae ===
Fragile forms with stiff parapodial lobes and multiple simple setal types. Poecilochaetus.

1 species

=== Family Spionidae ===
31 species including

- Aonides paucibranchiata
- Scolelepis bonnieri
- Scolelepis squamata
- Spiophanes bombyx

=== Family Magelonidae ===
Small forms with a shovel-like head and papillose palp pair. Magelona.

5 species

=== Family Cirratulidae ===
12 species including

- Cirratulus cirratus

== Order Cossurida ==
=== Family Cossuridae ===
Slender forms with a single median palp on dorsal side of one anterior setiger.

1 species

== Order Terebellida ==
=== Family Flabelligeridae ===
Papillated body and cross-barred setae. Flabelligera, Diplocirrus, Brada.

4 species including

- Diplocirrus glaucus
- Diplocirrus incognitus

=== Family Acrocirridae ===
1 species

== Order Capitellida ==
=== Family Capitellidae ===
9 species including

- Heteromastus filiformis

=== Family Arenicolidae ===
3 species including

- Arenicola marina (blow lungworm)

=== Family Maldanidae ===
Bamboo worms. Long and cylindrical and truncate at one or both ends. Most with long, cylindrical segments with a pair of nuchal slits and a median cephalic keel. Maldane, Axiothella, Rhodine, Nicomache.

10 species

== Order Opheliida ==
=== Family Opheliidae ===
9 species including

- Ophelina acuminata
- Thoracophelia flabellifera
- Ophelia limacina

=== Family Scalibregmatidae ===
Maggot-like or anteriorly inflated group with a small T-shaped prostomium. Scalibregma, Hyboscolex.

4 species including

- Scalibregma inflatum

== Order Nerillida ==
=== Family Nerillidae ===
1 species

- Nerilla antennata

== Order Polygordiida ==
=== Family Polygordiidae ===
Elongate nematode-like forms without setae, and with a stiff frontal tentacle pair. Polygordius.

2 species

== Order Protodrilida ==
=== Family Protodrilidae ===
Minute forms without setae and with a flexible tentacle pair (near-frontal, but separated). They live in spaces between sediment grains. Protodrilus.

1 species

== Order Polychaeta incertae sedis ==
=== Family Dinophilidae ===
- Dinophilus taeniatus

=== Family Saccocirridae ===
1 species

== Order Oweniida ==
=== Family Oweniidae ===
2 species

== Order Terebellida ==
=== Family Pectinariidae ===
3 species

=== Family Sabellariidae ===
3 species, including

- Sabellaria alveolata (honeycomb worm)
- Sabellaria spinulosa (Ross worm)
- Sabella spallanzanii (feather duster worm)

=== Family Ampharetidae ===
Forms with no posterior notosetae and usually with simple, transversely-arranged gills. Ampharete, Melinna

5 species including

- Ampharete acutifrons

=== Family Trichobranchidae ===
Resemble Terebellidae but have long-handled hooks. Terebellides.

2 species

=== Family Terebellidae ===
23 species, including

- Lanice conchilega
- Thelepus cincinnatus
- Lagis koreni (trumpet worm)

== Order Sabellida ==
=== Family Sabellidae ===
19 species including

- Sabella pavonina (peacock worm)

=== Family Serpulidae ===
8 species, including

- Janua pagenstecheri
- Ficopomatus enigmaticus (Australian tubeworm)
- Serpula vermicularis (red tubeworm)
- Spirobranchus triqueter
- Spirobranchus lamarckii

=== Family Spirorbidae ===
Small asymmetric fan worms with coiled calcareous tubes cemented to algae and rock. Spirorbis.

8 species, including

- Spirorbis spirorbis (sinistral spiral tubeworm)

== Order Myzostomida ==
=== Family Myzostomatidae ===
1 species

Class Aphanoneura

=== Family Aeolosomatidae ===
- Aeolosoma hemprichi
- Aeolosoma variegatum

Class Clitellata

Subclass Oligochaeta

== Order Opisthopora ==
=== Family Acanthodrilidae ===
1 species

=== Family Octochaetidae ===
1 species

=== Family Lumbricidae ===
26 species

- Allolobophora chlorotica (green worm)
- Allolobophoridella eiseni
- Aporrectodea caliginosa (grey worm)
- Aporrectodea cupulifera
- Aporrectodea icterica
- Aporrectodea limicola
- Aporrectodea longa
- Aporrectodea rosea (rosy-tipped worm)
- Dendrobaena attemsi
- Dendrobaena hortensis (European nightcrawler)
- Dendrobaena octaedra
- Dendrobaena veneta
- Dendrodrilus rubidus (red wiggler)
- Dendrodrilus subrubicundus
- Eisenia fetida (brandling worm)
- Eisenia parva
- Eiseniella tetraedra
- Helodrilus oculatus
- Lumbricus castaneus
- Lumbricus festivus (Quebec worm)
- Lumbricus friendi
- Lumbricus rubellus (red earthworm)
- Lumbricus terrestris (common earthworm)
- Murchieona minuscula
- Octolasion cyaneum
- Octolasion lacteum
- Satchellius mammalis

== Order Enchytraeida ==
=== Family Enchytraeidae ===
96 species

== Order Tubificida ==
=== Family Naididae ===
50 species

== Order Lumbriculida ==
=== Family Lumbriculidae ===
5 species

Class Clitellata

Subclass Hirudinea

== Order Arhynchobdellida ==
=== Family Erpobdellidae ===
5 species

=== Family Hirudinidae ===
1 species

- Hirudo medicinalis (European medicinal leech)

== Order Rhynchobdellida ==
=== Family Glossiphoniidae ===
7 species

=== Family Ozobranchidae ===
2 species

=== Family Piscicolidae ===
17 species
