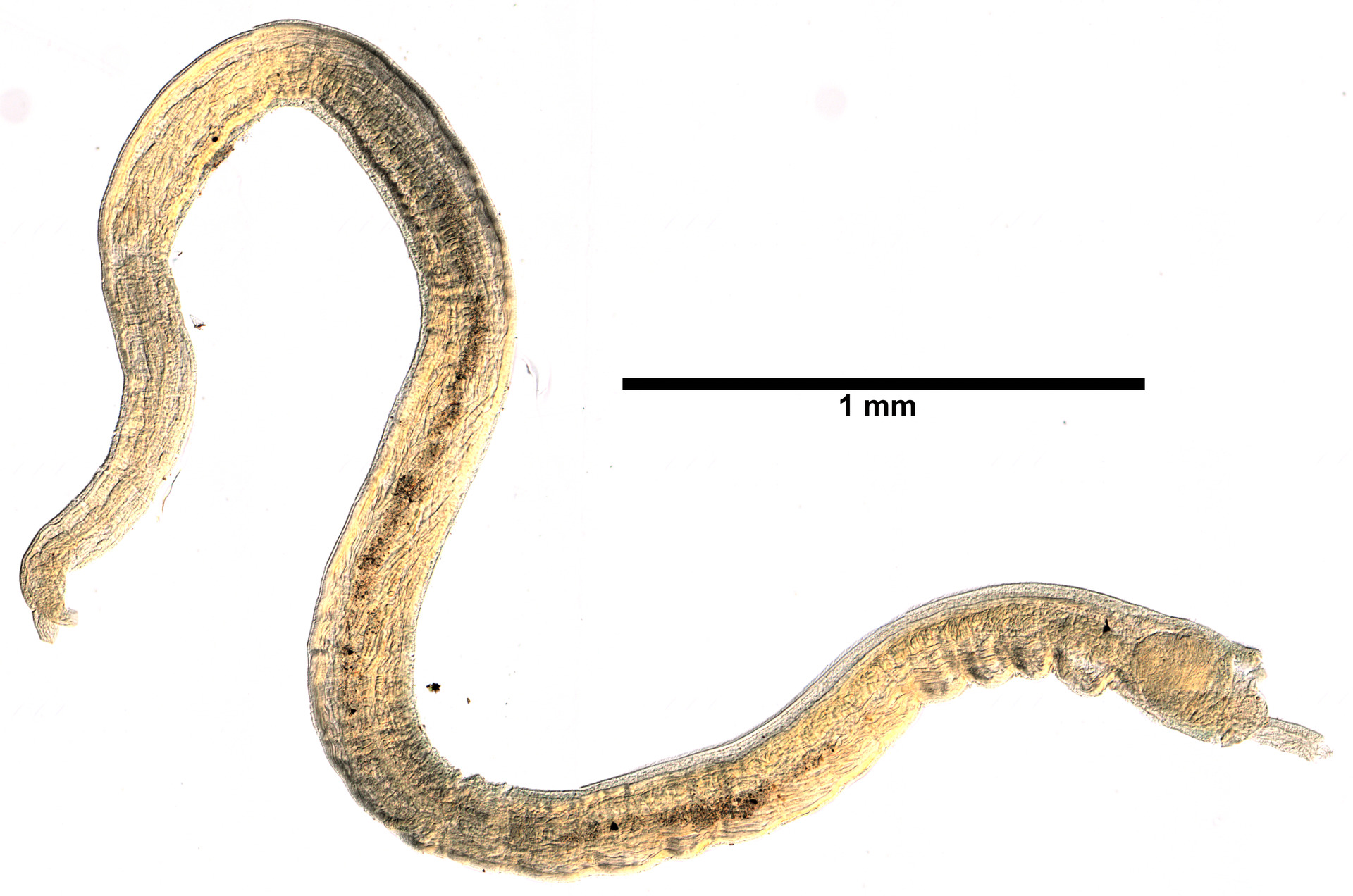
- Protodrilus mirabilis

Scientific classification
- Kingdom: Animalia
- Phylum: Annelida
- Clade: Pleistoannelida
- Subclass: Errantia
- Clade: Protodriliformia; Struck et al. 2015

Orders and families
- Polygordiidae; Protodrilida; Protodrilidae; Protodriloididae; Saccocirridae

= Protodriliformia =

Group of segmented worms

Protodriliformia is a clade of small marine polychaetes, comprised by the groups of meiofaunal interstitial worms Protodrilida and Polygordiidae, formerly considered "archiannelids". It is the most basal clade of Errantia.

== Evolutionary history ==
Phylogenetic analysis of annelids has found Protodriliformia to be the earliest diverging clade of Errantia. At the same time, the other half of "archiannelid" worms, Orbiniida, was found to be the earliest diverging clade of Sedentaria. The convergence between these two groups occurred through progenesis and miniaturization, as a way to adapt to the marine interstitial ecosystem between sand grains (i.e. interstitium). This means that the larval or juvenile stages of a larger pleistoannelid ancestor temporarily inhabiting the interstitium stopped their somatic growth, became sexually mature and stayed in the interstitium permanently.

- Pleistoannelida
  - Errantia
    - Aciculata
    - Protodriliformia
      - Protodrilida
        - - Protodriloididae
          - Protodrilidae
        - Saccocirridae
      - Polygordiidae
  - Sedentaria
    - Orbiniida
    - other Sedentaria
