= Mesonerilla prospera =

Conservation status
- Critically Endangered (IUCN 2.3)

Scientific classification
- Kingdom: Animalia
- Phylum: Annelida
- Clade: Pleistoannelida
- Clade: Sedentaria
- Order: Orbiniida
- Family: Nerillidae
- Genus: Mesonerilla
- Species: M. prospera

Binomial name
- Mesonerilla prospera Sterrer & Iliffe, 1982

Species of annelid

Mesonerilla prospera is a species of invertebrate in the Nerillidae family endemic to Bermuda. In 2000, M. prospera was put on the IUCN Red List under the critically endangered category. The IUCN states that "there are problems with the Order name and the correct placement of the family."
