= Orbiniella =

- O. spinosa

Scientific classification
- Kingdom: Animalia
- Phylum: Annelida
- Clade: Pleistoannelida
- Clade: Sedentaria
- Order: Orbiniida
- Family: Orbiniidae
- Subfamily: Microrbiniinae
- Genus: Orbiniella; Day, 1954

Genus of worms

Orbiniella is a genus of segmented worms in the family Orbiniidae. It was first described and established by John Hemsworth Osborne-Day in 1954. The genus has 26 different species.

== Species ==
- Orbiniella abyssalis Blake, 2020
- Orbiniella aciculata Blake, 1985
- Orbiniella acsara Blake, 2021
- Orbiniella andeepia Narayanaswamy & Blake, 2005
- Orbiniella annulata (Hartman, 1967)
- Orbiniella armata Blake, 2021
- Orbiniella dayi Branch, 1998
- Orbiniella eugeneruffi Blake, 2020
- Orbiniella grasslei Blake, 2020
- Orbiniella griegi Meca & Budaeva In Meca et al., 2024
- Orbiniella hobsonae Blake & Hilbig, 1990
- Orbiniella landrumae Blake, 2017
- Orbiniella longilobata Blake, 2020
- Orbiniella marionensis Gillet, 1999
- Orbiniella mayhemi Meca & Budaeva In Meca et al., 2024
- Orbiniella mimica Blake, 2021
- Orbiniella minima (Rullier, 1972)
- Orbiniella minuta Day, 1954
- Orbiniella nuda Hobson, 1974
- Orbiniella parapari Meca & Budaeva In Meca et al., 2024
- Orbiniella petersenae Parapar, Moreira & Helgason, 2015
- Orbiniella plumisetosa Buzhinskaya, 1993
- Orbiniella rugosa Blake, 2020
- Orbiniella spinosa Blake, 2017
- Orbiniella tumida Blake, 2020
- Orbiniella uniformis Hartman, 1967
