= Orbiniella mayhemi =

Scientific classification
- Kingdom: Animalia
- Phylum: Annelida
- Clade: Pleistoannelida
- Clade: Sedentaria
- Order: Orbiniida
- Family: Orbiniidae
- Genus: Orbiniella
- Species: O. mayhemi

Binomial name
- Orbiniella mayhemi Budaeva & Meca, 2024

Species of segmented worm

Orbiniella mayhemi is a species of segmented worm in the family Orbiniidae. It was named after Norwegian black metal band Mayhem and is found in the northeast Atlantic Ocean.

== Distribution ==
They are found in deep-sea water in the northeast Atlantic Ocean and Nordic Seas.

== See also ==
- List of organisms named after famous people (born 1975 - present)
