= Parergodrilus =

Scientific classification
- Domain: Eukaryota
- Kingdom: Animalia
- Phylum: Annelida
- Clade: Pleistoannelida
- Clade: Sedentaria
- Order: Orbiniida (?)
- Family: Parergodrilidae
- Genus: Parergodrilus; Reisinger, 1925

Genus of annelid worms

Parergodrilus is a genus of annelids belonging to the family Parergodrilidae.

The species of this genus are found in Europe and Japan.

Species:

- Parergodrilus heideri Reisinger, 1925
