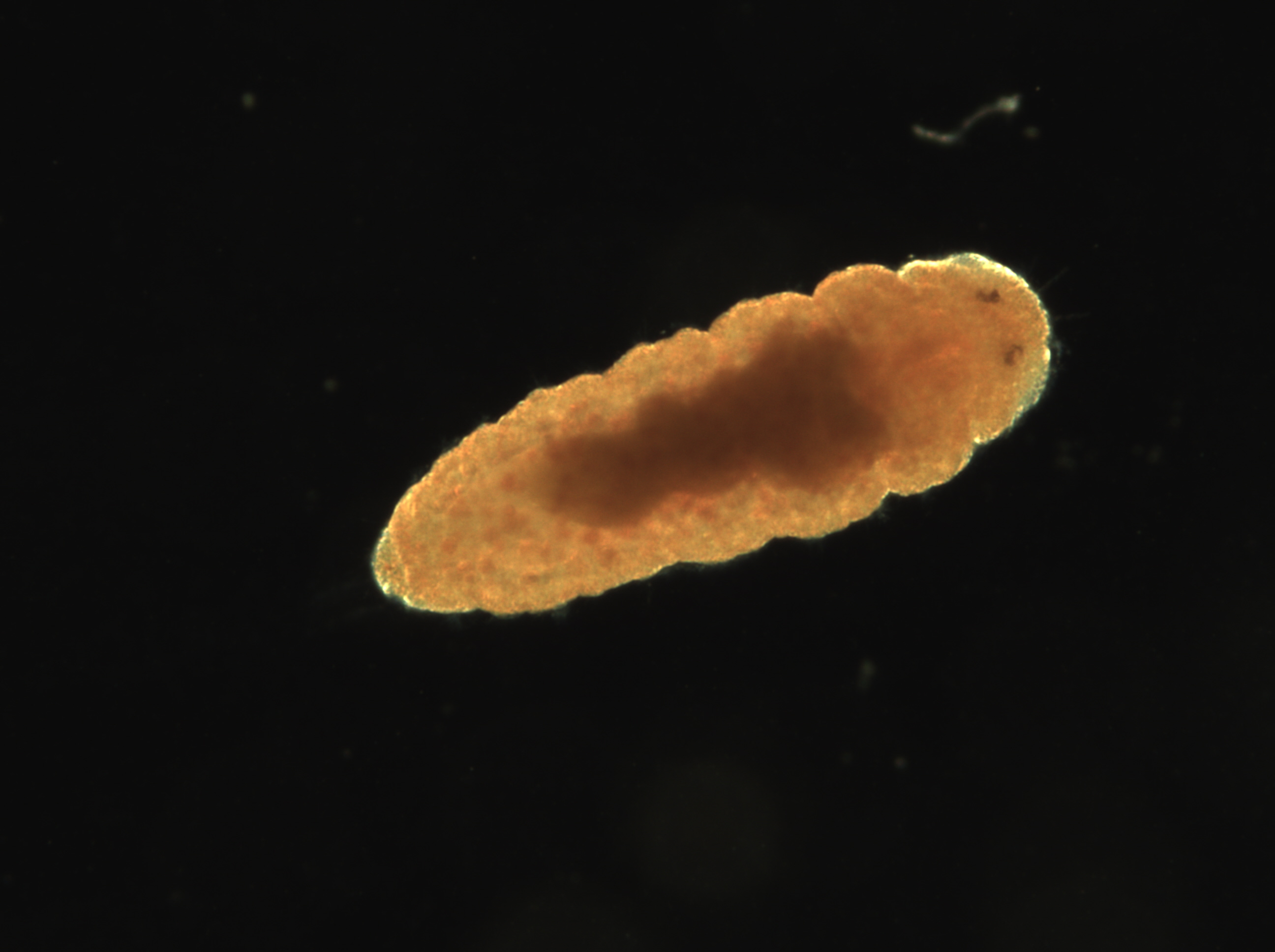

Scientific classification
- Kingdom: Animalia
- Phylum: Annelida
- Clade: Pleistoannelida
- Clade: Sedentaria
- Order: Orbiniida
- Family: Dinophilidae
- Genus: Dinophilus
- Species: D. taeniatus

Binomial name
- Dinophilus taeniatus Harmer, 1889

= Dinophilus taeniatus =

Species of annelid worm

Dinophilus taeniatus is a small annelid worm which lives in tidal pools. It is 1.5 – 2.5 mm long and about 150 μm wide, orange in colour, with two distinct dark pigmented eyes on its prostomium. The anterior part of prostomium has four large and many small bristles and sensory cilia. The trunk consist of 11 rings where the first nine rings are distinctly separate. The ventral trunk is densely covered with cilia. It is widely distributed around the UK coast, from the Irish Sea through to the Barents Sea. It has also been reported in 2021 in the salt marshes on the coast of New England, USA.

== Ecology ==
Free swimming Dinophilus taeniatus are found from October to June in tidal pools with the diatom Enteromorpha spp. and Ulva lactuca. Numbers peak March to April and decline with rising temperature and lesser diatom abundances, the decline is due to death of reproducing adults and obligatory encystment of juveniles.

== Distribution ==
It is found in the North Sea (Scottish and English east coast, Belgian coast, and Heligoland), English Channel (Plymouth, Roscoff), Irish Sea (North Wales, Isle of Man), Atlantic (Irish coasts, Faroe Islands), Spanish coast (Valencia), Baltic (Kiel Bay), Skagerrak (Swedish west coast), the White and Barents Sea, and in the salt marshes of New England, USA.

== Reproduction ==
Females produces a maximum of 4 cocoons with up to 16 eggs each in a sequence of 2–3 months. Excysted worms mature, feed and reproduce sexually until May.
