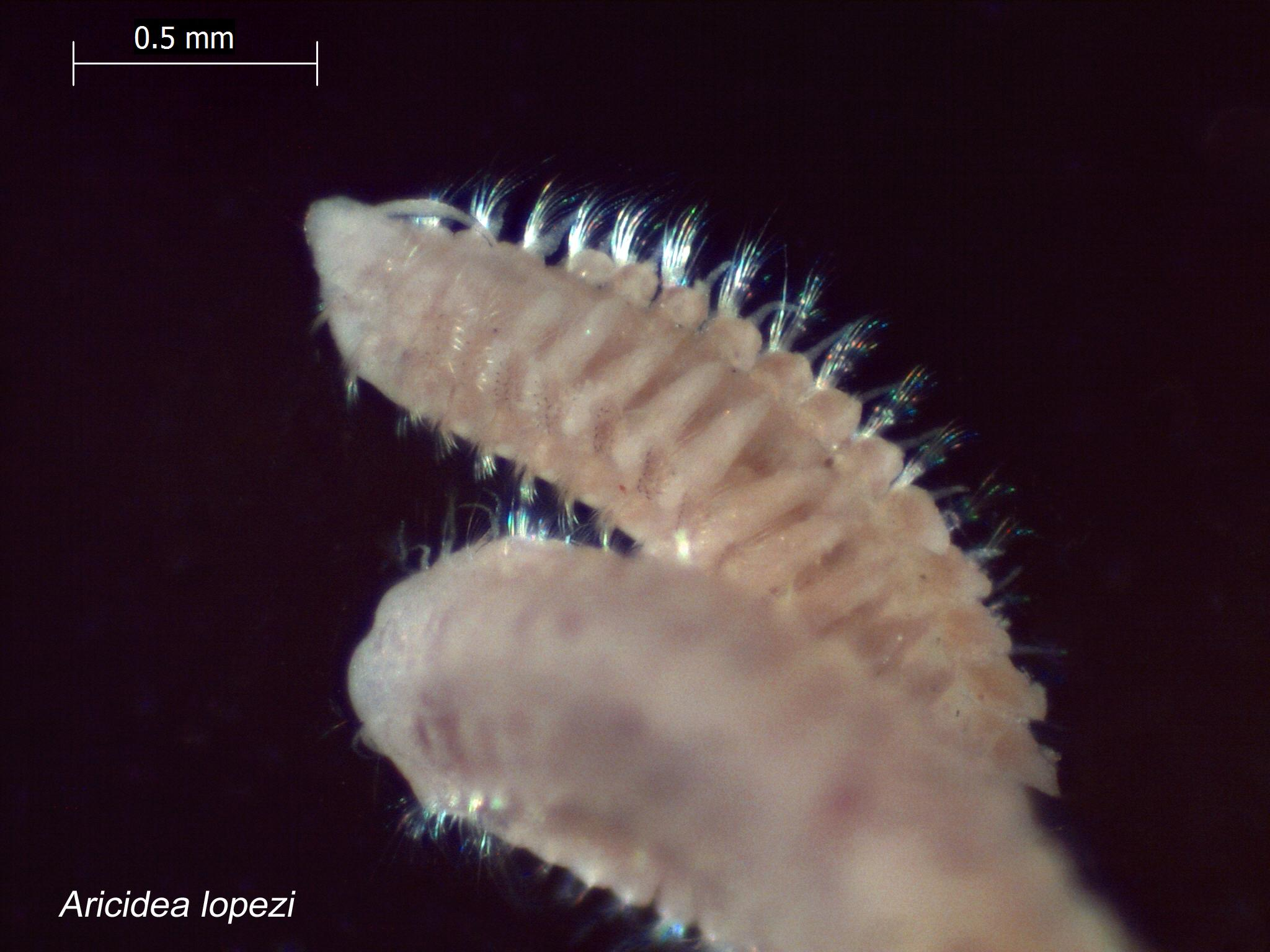
- Aricidea lopezi Berkeley & Berkeley, 1956

Scientific classification
- Domain: Eukaryota
- Kingdom: Animalia
- Phylum: Annelida
- Class: Polychaeta
- Order: Cirratulida
- Family: Paraonidae
- Genus: Aricidea; Webster, 1879

= Aricidea =

Genus of annelid worms

Aricidea is a genus of small paraonid worms, which are sub-surface deposit feeders and bioturbators. Aricidea worms have a prostomial antenna, with all Aricidea species (except those in the subgenus Aedicira) possessing neuropodial thickened chaetae.
