= Troglochaetus =

Scientific classification
- Domain: Eukaryota
- Kingdom: Animalia
- Phylum: Annelida
- Class: Polychaeta
- Order: Haplodrili
- Family: Nerillidae
- Genus: Troglochaetus; Delachaux, 1921

Genus of annelid worms

Troglochaetus is a genus of polychaetes belonging to the family Nerillidae.

The species of this genus are found in Europe and Northern America.

Species:

- Troglochaetus beranecki Delachaux, 1921
- Troglochaetus simplex (Levi, 1953)
