= Trilobodrilus =

Scientific classification
- Domain: Eukaryota
- Kingdom: Animalia
- Phylum: Annelida
- Class: Polychaeta
- Order: Haplodrili
- Family: Dinophilidae
- Genus: Trilobodrilus; Remane, 1925

Genus of annelid worms

Trilobodrilus is a genus of bristle worms in the family Dinophilidae. There are about five described species in Trilobodrilus.

== Species ==
These five species belong to the genus Trilobodrilus:

- Trilobodrilus axi Westheide, 1967
- Trilobodrilus heideri Remane, 1925
- Trilobodrilus hermaphroditus Riser, 1999
- Trilobodrilus nipponicus Uchida & Okuda, 1943
- Trilobodrilus windansea Kerbl, Vereide, Gonzalez, Rouse & Worsaae, 2018
