= Mesonerilla =

Scientific classification
- Domain: Eukaryota
- Kingdom: Animalia
- Phylum: Annelida
- Class: Polychaeta
- Order: Haplodrili
- Family: Nerillidae
- Genus: Mesonerilla

Genus of annelids

Mesonerilla is a genus of polychaetes in the Nerillidae family. It contains the following species:

- Mesonerilla armoricana Swedmark, 1959
- Mesonerilla biantennata Jouin, 1963
- Mesonerilla fagei Swedmark, 1959
- Mesonerilla intermedia Wilke, 1953
- Mesonerilla luederitzi Remane, 1949
- Mesonerilla prospera Sterrer & Iliffe, 1982
- Mesonerilla roscovita Levi, 1953
