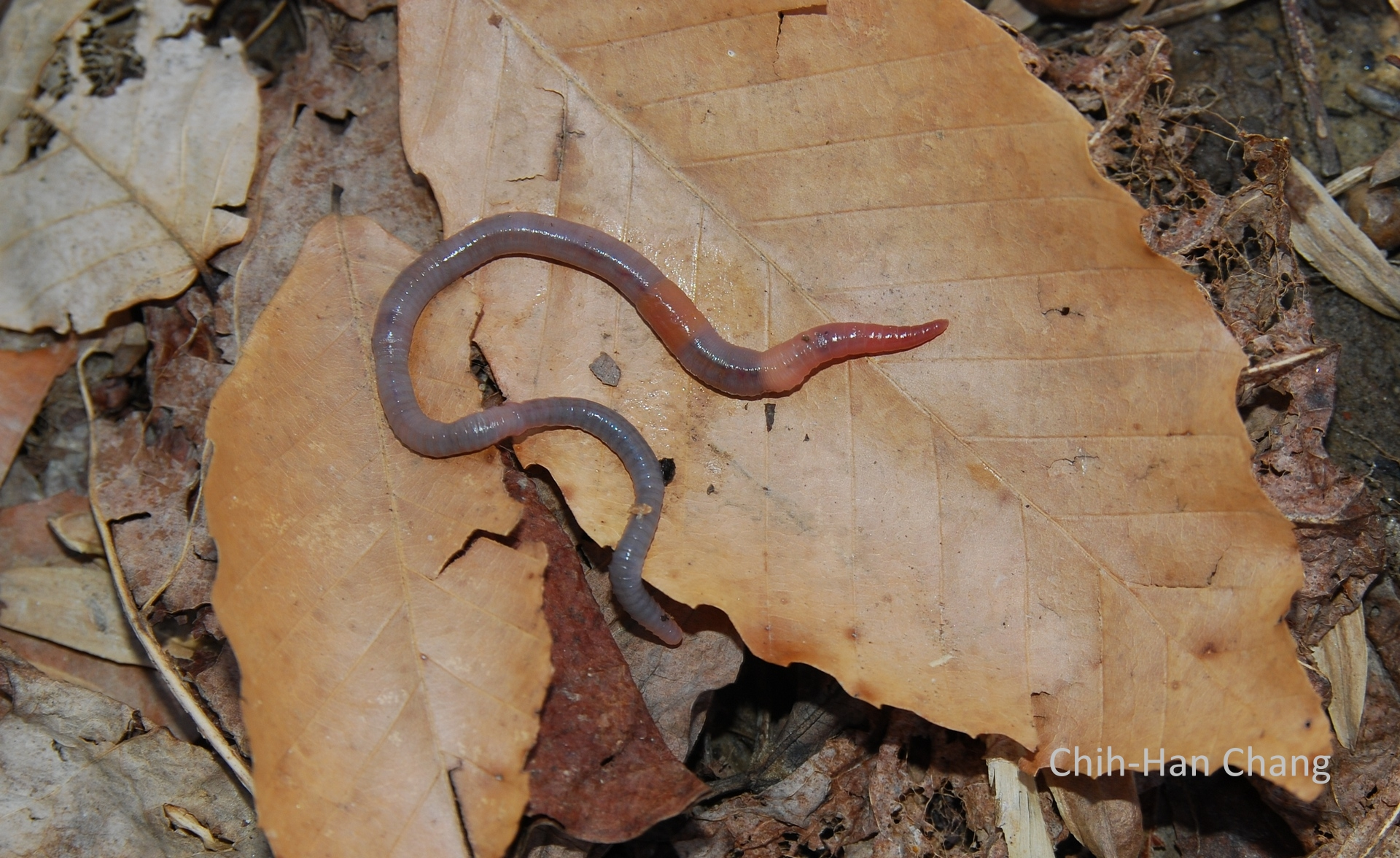
- Aporrectodea caliginosa

Scientific classification
- Domain: Eukaryota
- Kingdom: Animalia
- Phylum: Annelida
- Clade: Pleistoannelida
- Clade: Sedentaria
- Class: Clitellata
- Order: Opisthopora
- Family: Lumbricidae
- Genus: Aporrectodea; Orley, 1885

Species
- See text

= Aporrectodea =

Genus of annelid worms

Aporrectodea is a genus of earthworms in the family Lumbricidae. The genus includes some of the most common earthworms in the Palearctic realm and in agricultural soils across the temperate regions of the world.

Several species are found throughout the world today, having been widely introduced via agriculture. One of these widespread species, A. trapezoides, was also transported across continents as a popular fishing bait.

Some species of this genus are known to be important in the process of soil formation.

Among the most familiar species is Aporrectodea caliginosa, which has been known as a species complex made up of several very similar taxa whose relationships were not clear. A phylogenetic analysis confirmed that these taxa are separate species, including A. trapezoides, A. tuberculata, A. longa, and A. nocturna.

== Species ==
Species include:

- Aporrectodea alavanensis
- Aporrectodea alba
- Aporrectodea anamariae
- Aporrectodea andorranensis
- Aporrectodea annula
- Aporrectodea aragonensis
- Aporrectodea ariadne
- Aporrectodea arverna
- Aporrectodea atlantica
- Aporrectodea balisa
- Aporrectodea bohiniana
- Aporrectodea borellii
- Aporrectodea bulgarica
- Aporrectodea burgosana
- Aporrectodea byanensis
- Aporrectodea caliginosa
- Aporrectodea catalaunensis
- Aporrectodea cemernicensis
- Aporrectodea chitae
- Aporrectodea cuendeti
- Aporrectodea cupulifera
- Aporrectodea cyanea
- Aporrectodea diazi
- Aporrectodea dinarica
- Aporrectodea dubiosa
- Aporrectodea edwardsi
- Aporrectodea eurytanica
- Aporrectodea eurytrichos
- Aporrectodea faeculentes
- Aporrectodea georgii
- Aporrectodea gogna
- Aporrectodea graffi
- Aporrectodea haymozi
- Aporrectodea haymoziformis
- Aporrectodea hongae
- Aporrectodea hrabei
- Aporrectodea iberica
- Aporrectodea icterica
- Aporrectodea jassyensis
- Aporrectodea jenensis
- Aporrectodea joffrei
- Aporrectodea kioniona
- Aporrectodea kozjekensis
- Aporrectodea lanzai
- Aporrectodea ligra
- Aporrectodea limicola
- Aporrectodea longa
- Aporrectodea lopezi
- Aporrectodea macvensis
- Aporrectodea mediterranea
- Aporrectodea micella
- Aporrectodea microcoprodomas
- Aporrectodea microendogea
- Aporrectodea molleri
- Aporrectodea monticola
- Aporrectodea morenoe
- Aporrectodea mrsici
- Aporrectodea multitheca
- Aporrectodea navarrensis
- Aporrectodea opisthopora
- Aporrectodea opisthosellata
- Aporrectodea pannoniella
- Aporrectodea papukiana
- Aporrectodea predalpina
- Aporrectodea pseudoantipai
- Aporrectodea pseudoeiseni
- Aporrectodea pulvinus
- Aporrectodea retropuberta
- Aporrectodea riparia
- Aporrectodea rosea
- Aporrectodea rubicunda
- Aporrectodea sardonica
- Aporrectodea smaragdina
- Aporrectodea smaragdinoides
- Aporrectodea subterrestris
- Aporrectodea terrestris
- Aporrectodea thaleri
- Aporrectodea tiginosa
- Aporrectodea vasconensis
- Aporrectodea velox
- Aporrectodea zhongi
- Aporrectodea zicsii
