= Parergodrilidae =

Scientific classification
- Domain: Eukaryota
- Kingdom: Animalia
- Phylum: Annelida
- Clade: Pleistoannelida
- Clade: Sedentaria
- Order: Orbiniida (?)
- Family: Parergodrilidae

Family of worms

Parergodrilidae is an enigmatic family of polychaetes with only two genera, Stygocapitella, which lives on the coast; and Parergodrilus, which is terrestrial.

They share much in common with the clitellates, but molecular data place them with Questa and Orbiniidae.
