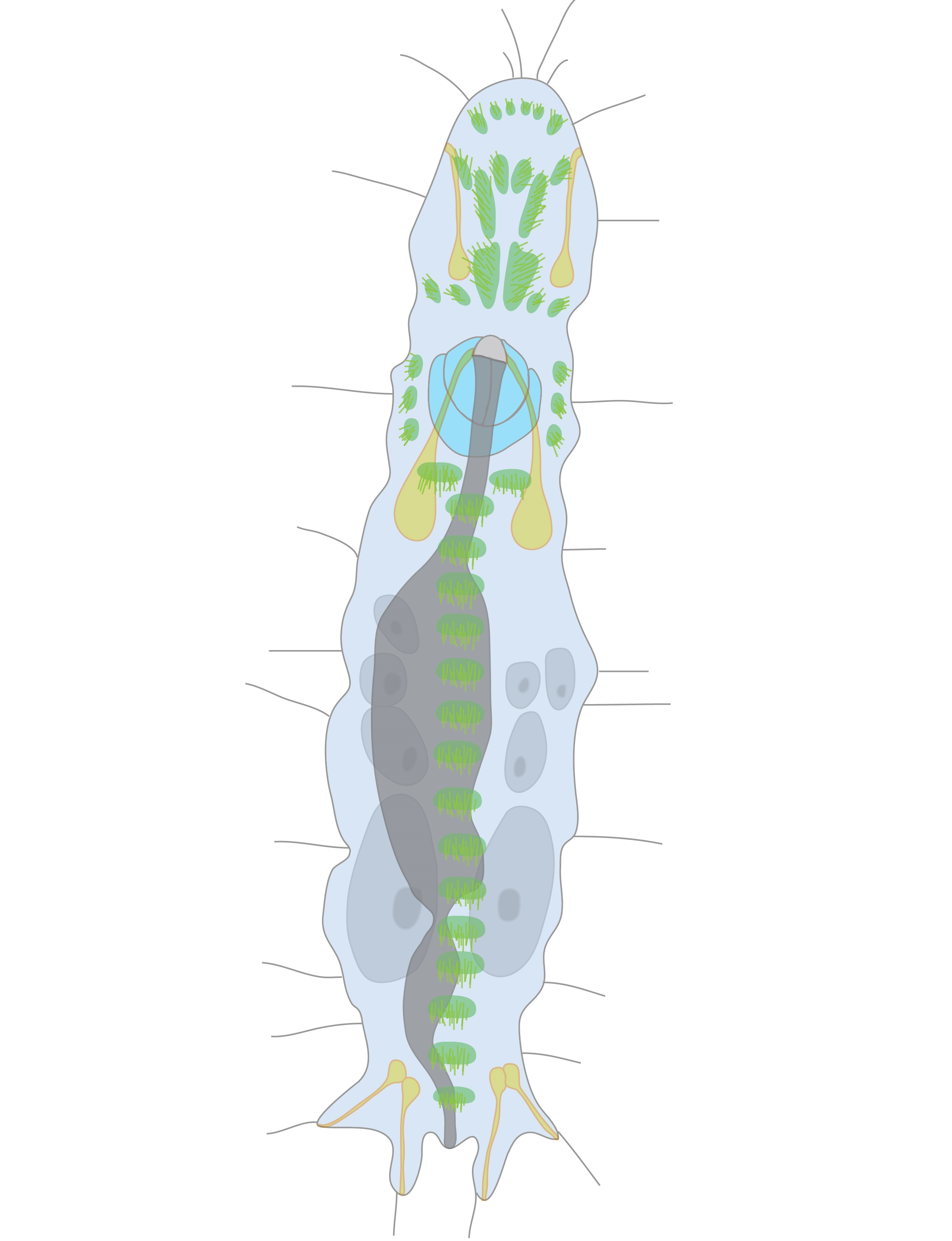

Scientific classification
- Kingdom: Animalia
- Phylum: Annelida
- Clade: Pleistoannelida
- Clade: Sedentaria
- Order: Orbiniida
- Family: Diurodrilidae; Kristensen & Niilonen, 1982
- Genus: Diurodrilus; Remane, 1925

Type species
- Diurodrilus minimus Remane, 1925

Species
- D. minimus Remane, 1925; D. ankeli Ax, 1967; D. benazzii Gerlach, 1953; D. dohrni Gerlach, 1952; D. subterraneus Remane, 1934; D. westheidei Kristensen & Niilonen, 1982

= Diurodrilus =

Genus of annelid worms

Diurodrilus is a genus of tiny marine animals classified as orbiniid annelid worms. With a maximum length of 0.45 mm, it has an unusual morphology with many traits not found in other annelids, including a ventral creeping foot. Analyses of DNA have both refuted and supported placement within the annelids, with the unusual morphology perhaps due to evolutionary progenesis, in which organisms develop sexual maturity while retaining the larval traits of their ancestors.

The following species are recognised:

- Diurodrilus minimus Remane, 1925
- Diurodrilus ankeli Ax, 1967
- Diurodrilus benazzii Gerlach, 1953
- Diurodrilus dohrni Gerlach, 1952
- Diurodrilus subterraneus Remane, 1934
- Diurodrilus westheidei Kristensen & Niilonen, 1982
