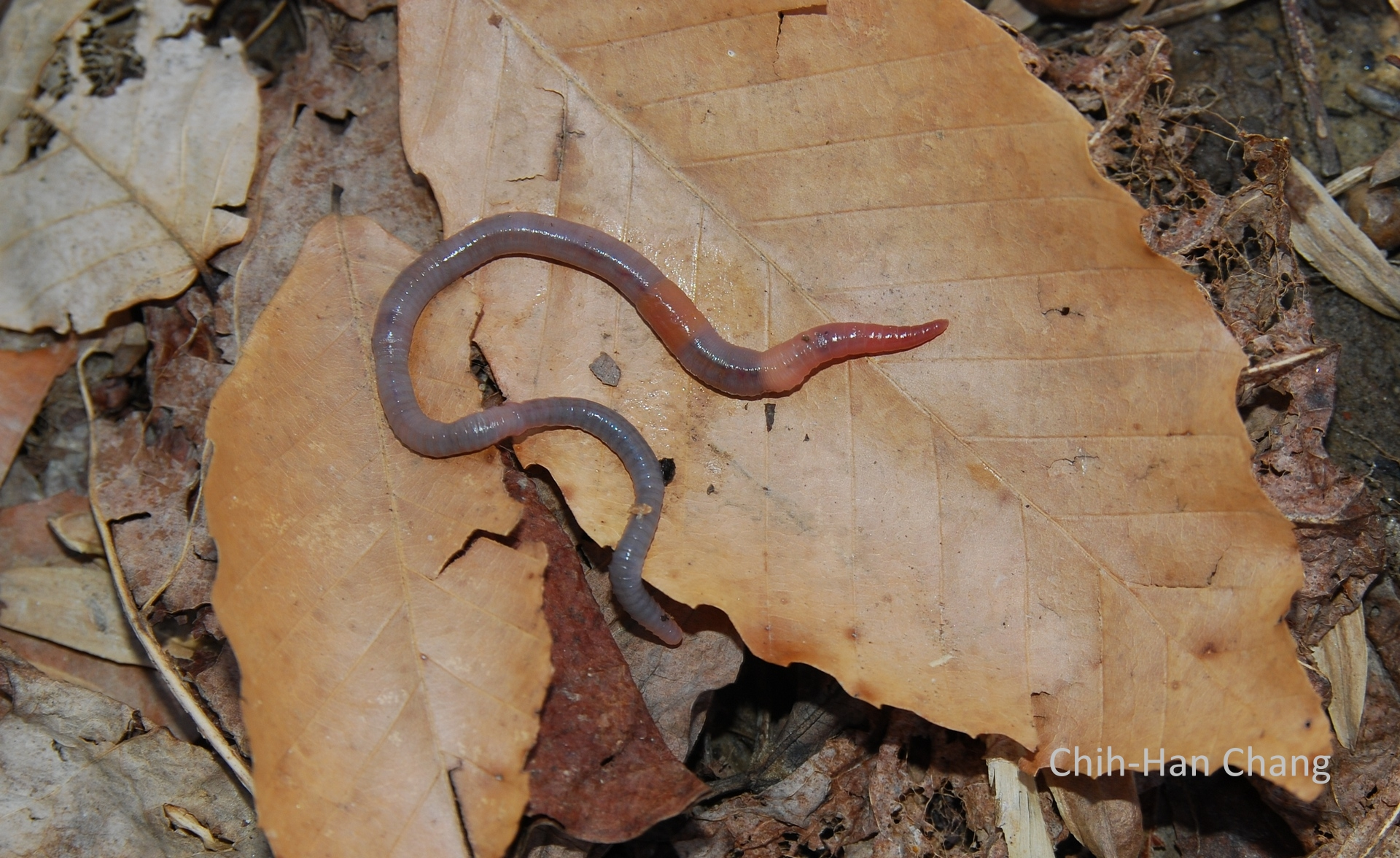

Scientific classification
- Kingdom: Animalia
- Phylum: Annelida
- Clade: Pleistoannelida
- Clade: Sedentaria
- Class: Clitellata
- Order: Opisthopora
- Family: Lumbricidae
- Genus: Aporrectodea
- Species: A. caliginosa

Binomial name
- Aporrectodea caliginosa (Savigny, 1826)

= Aporrectodea caliginosa =

Species of annelid

Aporrectodea caliginosa (also known as Allolobophora similis or the grey worm) is an earthworm commonly found in Great Britain. It is recognizable by the three distinct shades of colour at its front end, and it is 6 centimetres (2.4 in) in length when not moving. Its saddle pads usually form a two humped ridge across three segments along the length of the saddle, however this is not clearly visible. The worm mostly lies in non-permanent horizontal burrows in topsoil, and is rarely found in leaf litter. Like most worms, its diet consists only of soil.
