= Protodriloides =

Scientific classification
- Kingdom: Animalia
- Phylum: Annelida
- Clade: Pleistoannelida
- Subclass: Errantia
- Order: Protodrilida
- Family: Protodriloididae; Purschke & Jouin, 1988
- Genus: Protodriloides; Jouin, 1966

Genus of annelids

Protodriloides is a genus of polychaetes belonging to the monotypic family Protodriloididae.

The species of this genus are found in Europe and Northern America.

Species:

- Protodriloides chaetifer (Remane, 1926)
- Protodriloides symbioticus (Giard, 1904)
