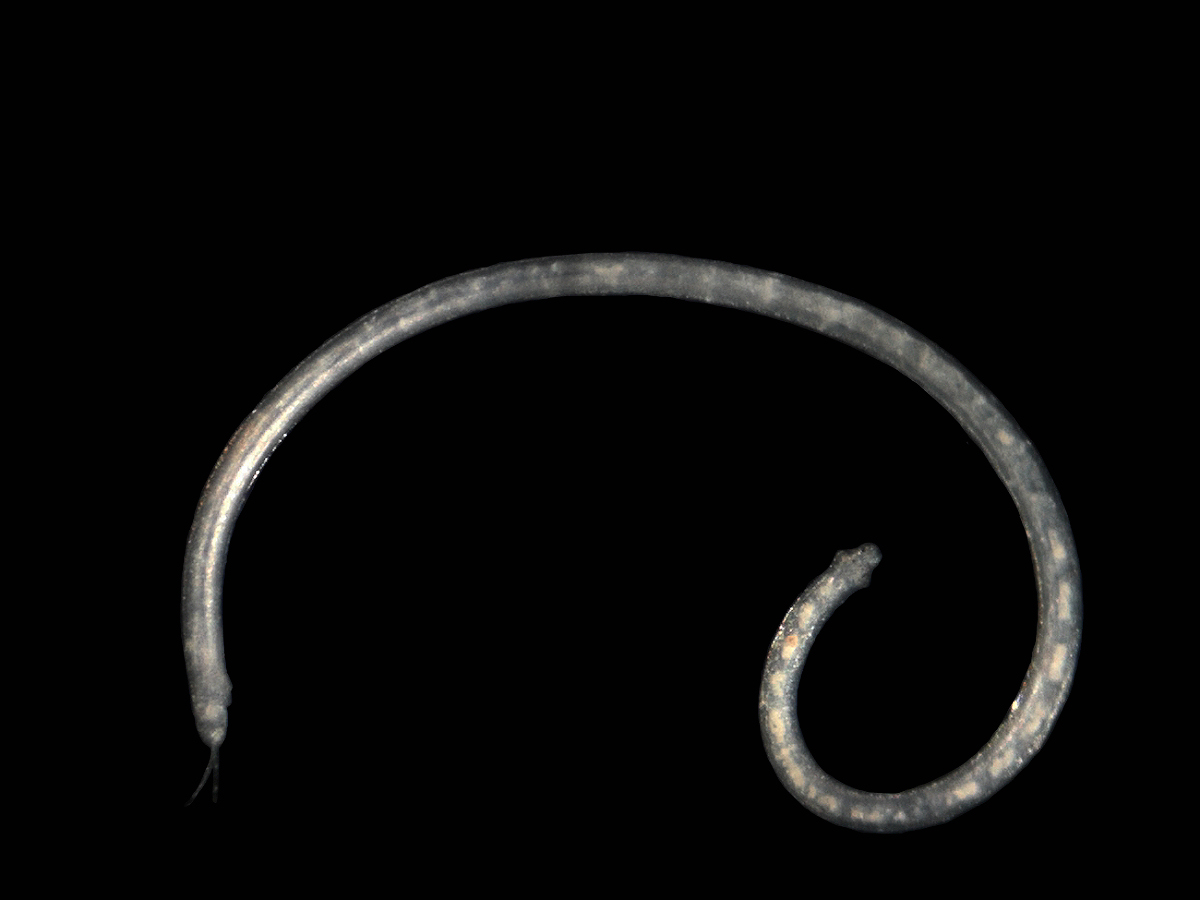
- An image of Polygordius appendiculatus, an archiannelid species.

Scientific classification
- Kingdom: Animalia
- Phylum: Annelida
- Class: Polychaeta
- Order: Haplodrili; Lankester, unknown date

Families
- Dinophilidae; Nerillidae; Polygordiidae; Protodrilidae; Saccocirridae

Synonyms
- Archiannelida Hatschek, 1878

= Haplodrili =

Haplodrili Temporal range: 530–0 Ma Cambrian (or earlier?) - present

Order of annelids

Haplodrili, or Archiannelida, is an order of primitive polychaete worms. Zoologist Ray Lankester gave it the name haplodrili, while zoologist Berthold Hatschek later named it Archiannelida. Once considered to be a class under Annelida, and even a separate phylum, Haplodrili is now widely accepted to be an order under Polychaeta. Species in this order are known for completely lacking external segments.

== Overview ==
Polygordius and Protodrilus live in sand, but while the former moves by means of the contraction of its body-wall muscles, Protodrilus can progress by the action of the bands of cilia surrounding its segments, and of the longitudinal ciliated ventral groove. Saccocirrus, which also lives in sand, and more closely resembles the Polychaeta, has throughout the greater length of its body on each segment a pair of small uniramous parapodia bearing a bunch of simple setae. No other member of the group is known to have any trace of setae or parapodia at any stage of development.

== Commonality ==
These three genera have the following characters in common. The body is small and resembles polychaete larvae; the epidermis is ciliated; the number of segments varies from five and up, or can be completely absent; small prostomium with or without appendages; parapodia absent; septa reduced or absent; the nervous system consists of a brain and longitudinal ventral nerve cords closely connected with the epidermis (without distinct ganglia); this is widely separated in Saccocirrus, closely approximated in Protodrilus, and fused together in Polygordius; the coelom is well developed and the dorsal and ventral longitudinal mesenteries are complete; the nephridia are simple, and open into the coelom. Polygordius differs from Protodrilus and Saccocirrus in the absence of a distinct suboesophageal muscular pouch, and in the absence of a peculiar closed cavity in the head region, which is especially well developed in Saccocirrus, and probably represents the specialized coelom of the first segment. Moreover, in Saccocirrus the genital organs, present in the majority of the trunk segments, have become much more complicated. In the female, every fertile segment has a pair of spermathecae opening at the nephridiopores. In the male, every genital segment has a right and a left protrusible penis, into which both the nephridium and a sperm-sac open. The wide funnels of the nephridia of this region are possibly of coelomic origin.

== See also ==
- Appendiculata
