= Aberranta =

Scientific classification
- Domain: Eukaryota
- Kingdom: Animalia
- Phylum: Annelida
- Class: Polychaeta
- Order: incertae sedis
- Family: Aberrantidae
- Genus: Aberranta

Genus of annelid worms

Aberranta is a genus of polychaete thought to be related to the Nerillidae.
