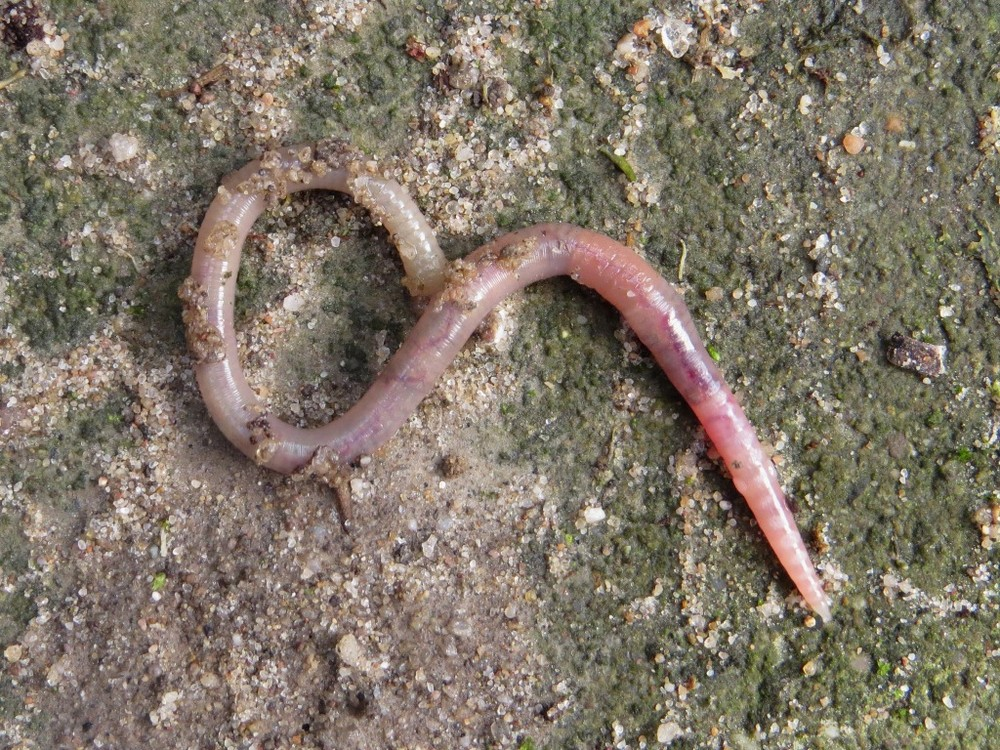
- The Aporrectodea Rosea earthworm

Scientific classification
- Domain: Eukaryota
- Kingdom: Animalia
- Phylum: Annelida
- Clade: Pleistoannelida
- Clade: Sedentaria
- Class: Clitellata
- Order: Opisthopora
- Family: Lumbricidae
- Genus: Aporrectodea
- Species: A. rosea

Binomial name
- Aporrectodea rosea (Savigny, 1826)

= Aporrectodea rosea =

Species of annelid

Aporrectodea rosea, the rosy-tipped worm, is a species of earthworm commonly found in Europe especially in Ukraine.
