= Aberrantidae =

Scientific classification
- Kingdom: Animalia
- Phylum: Annelida
- Class: Polychaeta
- Order: incertae sedis
- Family: Aberrantidae

Family of polychaete worms

Aberrantidae is a family of polychaetes belonging to the clade Aciculata. They are present in marine aquatic environments such as coasts, continental shelves, deep sea and soft substrates such as marine sand or muddy sediment. Records state ranges from inshore sediments in the Northwest Atlantic Florida Peninsula and Gulf of Mexico, Eastern USA, the Bering Sea in Saint Paul Island, Southeastern Brazil, the Gulf of Lion in Southern France, French Polynesia in Mo'orea, Hong Kong in China and the Antarctic Peninsula. Documented species have only been recorded from Brazil, Eastern USA, the Mediterranean and China. Due to size and fragility, the specimens often lacked significant appendages (such as antennae) which led to misidentification and a lack of analysis on the family. Females produce rounded-cuboid eggs throughout their body cavity, and males produce sperm structure consisting of spherical heads, an acrosome along with four rounded mitochondria and a 9 + 2 axoneme. This suggests broadcast spawning as a likely method of reproduction.

== Morphology ==
The members of this family all exhibit similar morphology and characteristics to each other, with only minor differences. The adults have tiny, threadlike and slender body plans and typically measure between approximately 4 to 6 mm and have 30-40 chaetigers (bristle bearing segments). The surface of the body is highly ciliated, such as a mid-ventral ciliated band which allows the worms to glide more easily across surfaces.

The prostomium is rounded and usually has at least one antenna dorsally while some species also have lateral antennae and simple eyes. They possess heavily ciliated, ventrolateral grooved palps which connect to a longitudinal mouth slit surrounded by a semicircular or U shaped lower lip. They lack a mandible or jaws, instead utilising a muscular ventral pharyngeal organ and ciliated folds, which is followed by a straight muscular pharynx.

They lack chaetae on 3 peristomial annuli (rings) behind the head; the first annulus is small and only visible dorsally, the other two annuli are longer and more cylindrical. They possess biramous parapodia (two branched feet) with fusiform post-chaetal lobes which contain bacillary glands, which open through skin pores and can stain bright red if treated with Rose Bengal dye. They typically have branchiae (gills) above the parapodia from segments 3 or 4 to the middle body region. They lack aciculae (internal rods) for the parapodia, instead using 3 to 4 capillary bristles for each foot for support.

They possess 3 types of chaetae: the notopodium (upper branch) of the parapodium has hair-like capillary chaetae, the neuropodium (lower branch) carries 2 to 4 lyriform (lyre shaped) chaetae, with curved and long hooked-tipped chaetae right below them. The small pygidium (rear end) has a terminal anus, a conical papilla (single middle ventral bump) and lateral anal cirri.

Genera:

- Aberranta Hartman, 1965

Species:

- Aberranta banyulensis
- Aberranta enigmatica
- Aberranta magnumlanai
- Aberranta palpata
- Aberranta sulcata
