= John H. Day =

South African marine biologist

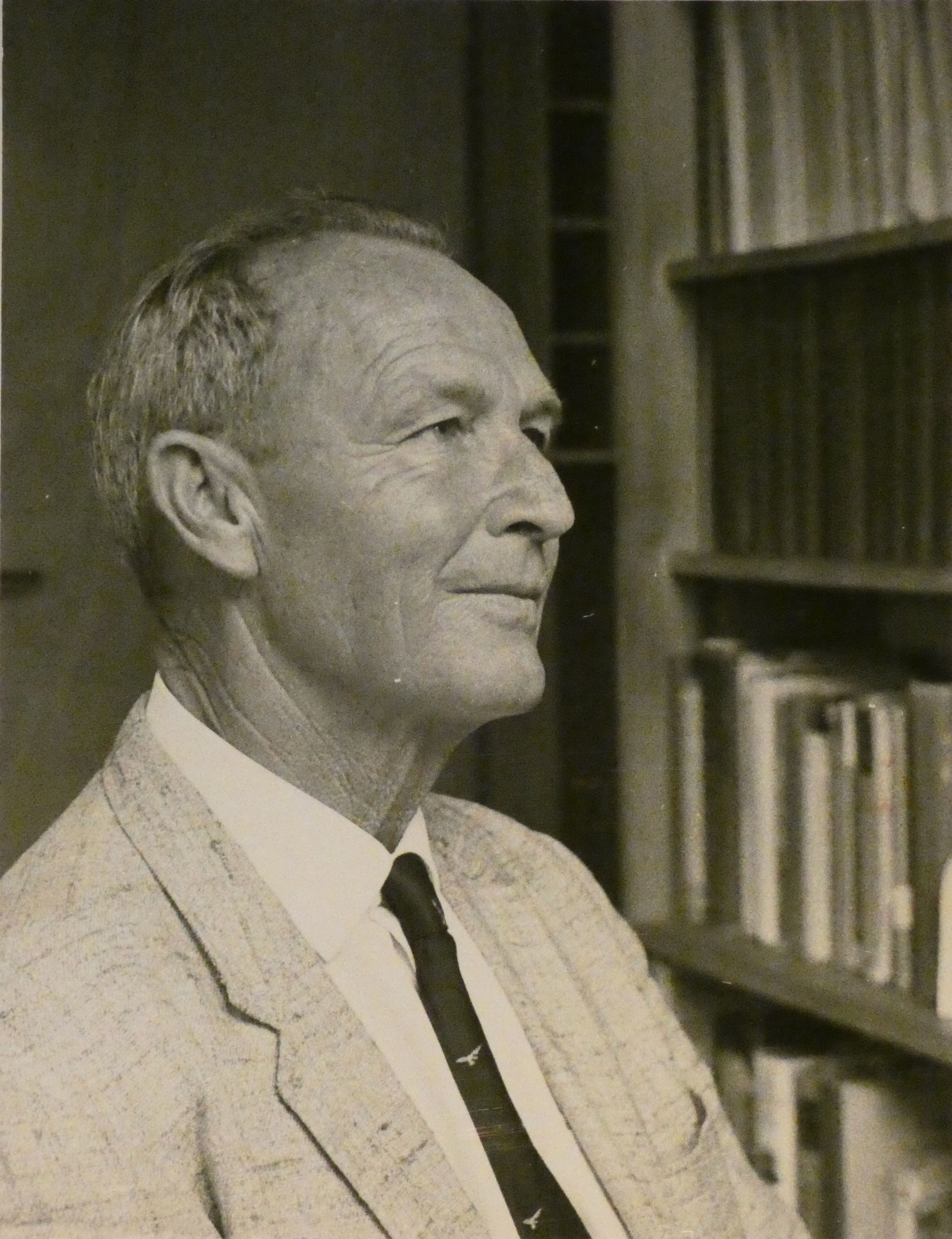
- John H Day at the University of Cape Town
- Born: August 25, 1909; Sussex
- Died: April 24, 1989 (aged 79); Knysna
- Citizenship: South African
- Education: University of Liverpool, Rhodes University
- Scientific career
- Fields: marine biologist, zoologist
- Workplaces: University of Cape Town
- Author abbrev. (zoology): Day

John Hemsworth Osborne-Day (25 August 1909 – 24 April 1989 ) was a South African marine biologist and invertebrate zoologist who was born in Sussex and who died in Knysna. He is best known for his work on the taxonomy of Polychaeta and for his studies on the ecology of South African estuaries.

== Career ==
John Day received his BSc from Rhodes University in 1931, his PhD from the University of Liverpool and subsequently lectured at Durham University. In 1938 he was appointed as research assistant to Professor T. A. Stephenson in the Zoology Department of the University of Cape Town.

During World War 2 he joined the Royal Air Force and become squadron leader in Bomber Command. He lost a leg after a bombing raid and received the Distinguished Flying Cross (United Kingdom) and bar.

Following the War, John Day returned to the University of Cape Town and in 1947 was appointed head of the Zoology Department, a position he held until his retirement in 1974. He was a Fellow of the Linnean Society of London and Fellow of the Royal Society of South Africa. In 1967 John Day published his two volume Monograph on the Polychaeta of Southern Africa, and this publication is still a widely used identification tool to the major groups of these common and diverse marine worms. He also authored books on South African marine life and on estuarine ecology in South Africa as well as numerous journal articles.

John Day described 189 species of polychaetes.
