= Appendiculata =

Obsolete term for annelid worm taxon

Appendiculata is a zoological name introduced by E. Ray Lankester (preface to the English edition of C. Gegenbaur's Comparative Anatomy), and employed by the same writer in the 9th edition of Encyclopædia Britannica (article "Zoology") to denote the eighth phylum, or major division, of coelomate animals.

The animals thus associated, the Rotifera, Annelida and Arthropoda, are composed of a larger or smaller number of hollow rings, each ring possessing typically a pair of hollow lateral appendages, moved by intrinsic muscles and penetrated by blood-spaces.

The term appendiculata is now more properly the specific name of many different species of both plants and animals.

== See also ==
- Scientific classification
