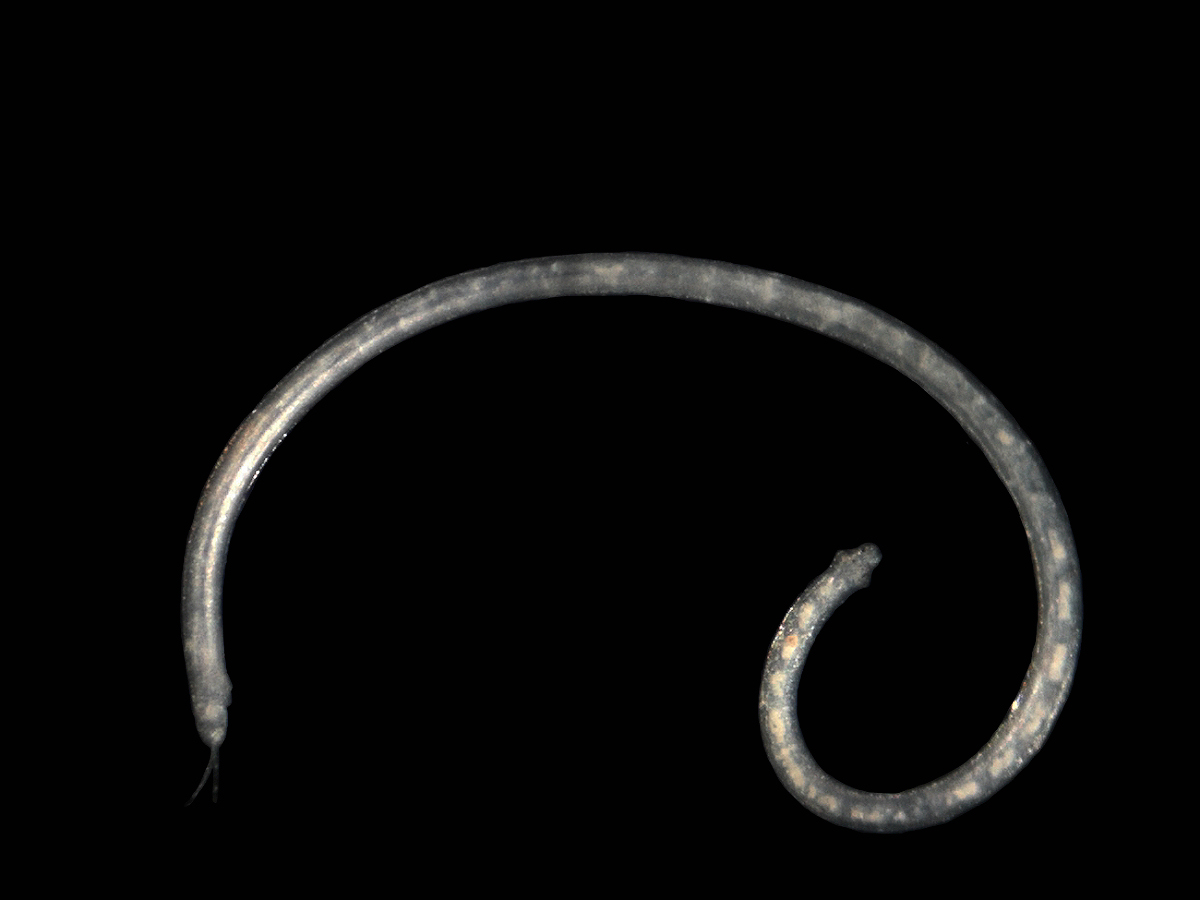
- Polygordius appendiculatus

Scientific classification
- Domain: Eukaryota
- Kingdom: Animalia
- Phylum: Annelida
- Clade: Pleistoannelida
- Subclass: Errantia
- Clade: Protodriliformia
- Family: Polygordiidae

= Polygordiidae =

Family of annelid worms

Polygordiidae is a family of polychaetes belonging to the class Polychaeta, order unknown.

Genera:

- Chaetogordius Moore, 1904
- Polycoryna
- Polygordius Schneider, 1868
