= Paraonidae =

Scientific classification
- Kingdom: Animalia
- Phylum: Annelida
- Class: Polychaeta
- Order: Cirratulida
- Family: Paraonidae; Cerruti, 1909

Family of polychaetes

Paraonidae is a family of polychaetes belonging to the order Cirratulida.

== Genera ==
Genera:

- Aedicira Hartman, 1957
- Aparaonis Hartman, 1965
- Aricidea Webster, 1879
