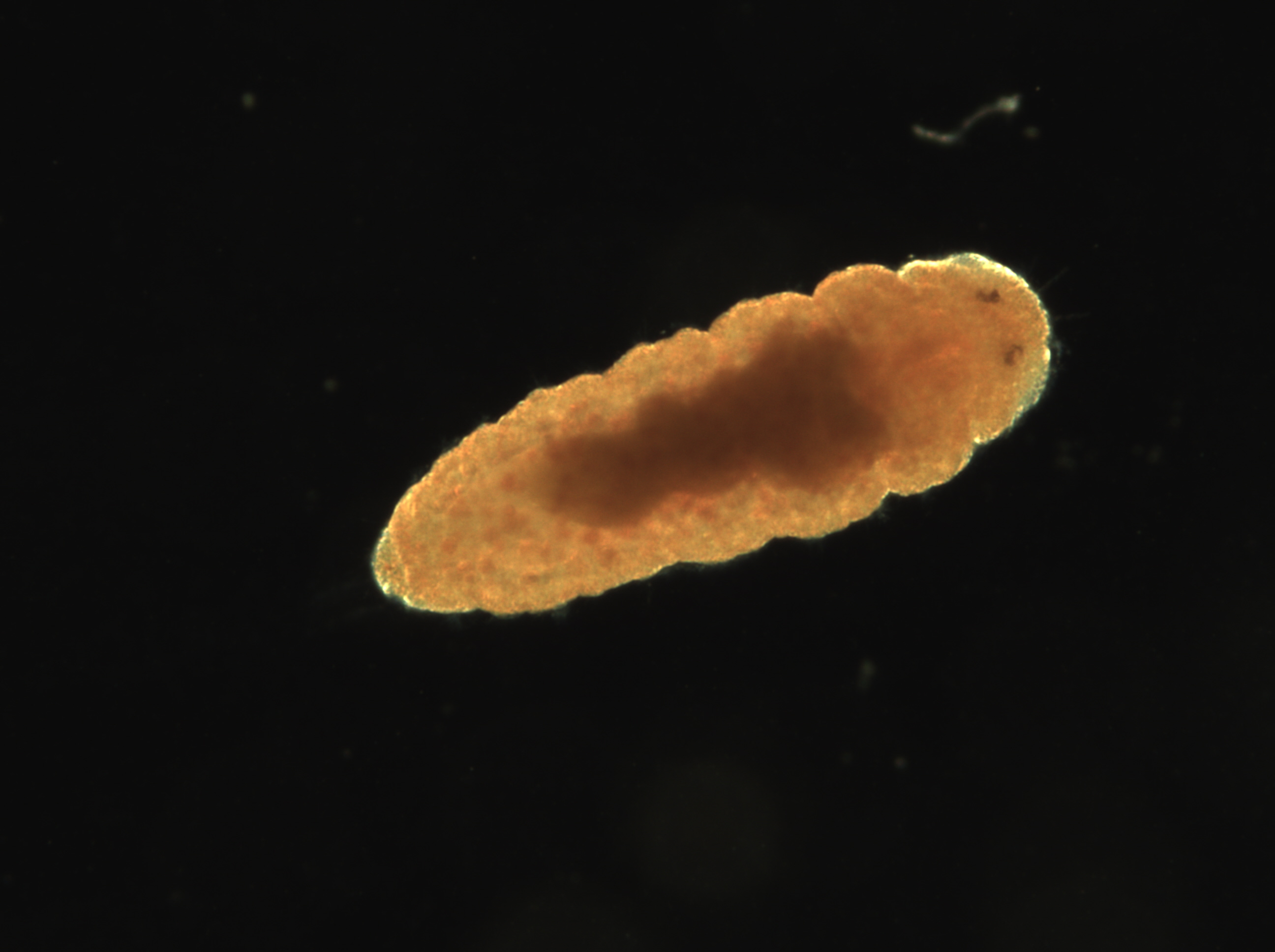
- Dinophilus taeniatus

Scientific classification
- Kingdom: Animalia
- Phylum: Annelida
- Clade: Pleistoannelida
- Clade: Sedentaria
- Order: Orbiniida
- Family: Dinophilidae; Macalister, 1876

Genera
- Dinophilus; Trilobodrilus

= Dinophilidae =

Family of annelids

Dinophilidae is a family of orbiniid annelids comprising the two genera Dinophilus and Trilobodrilus, first linked based on their sperm morphology.
