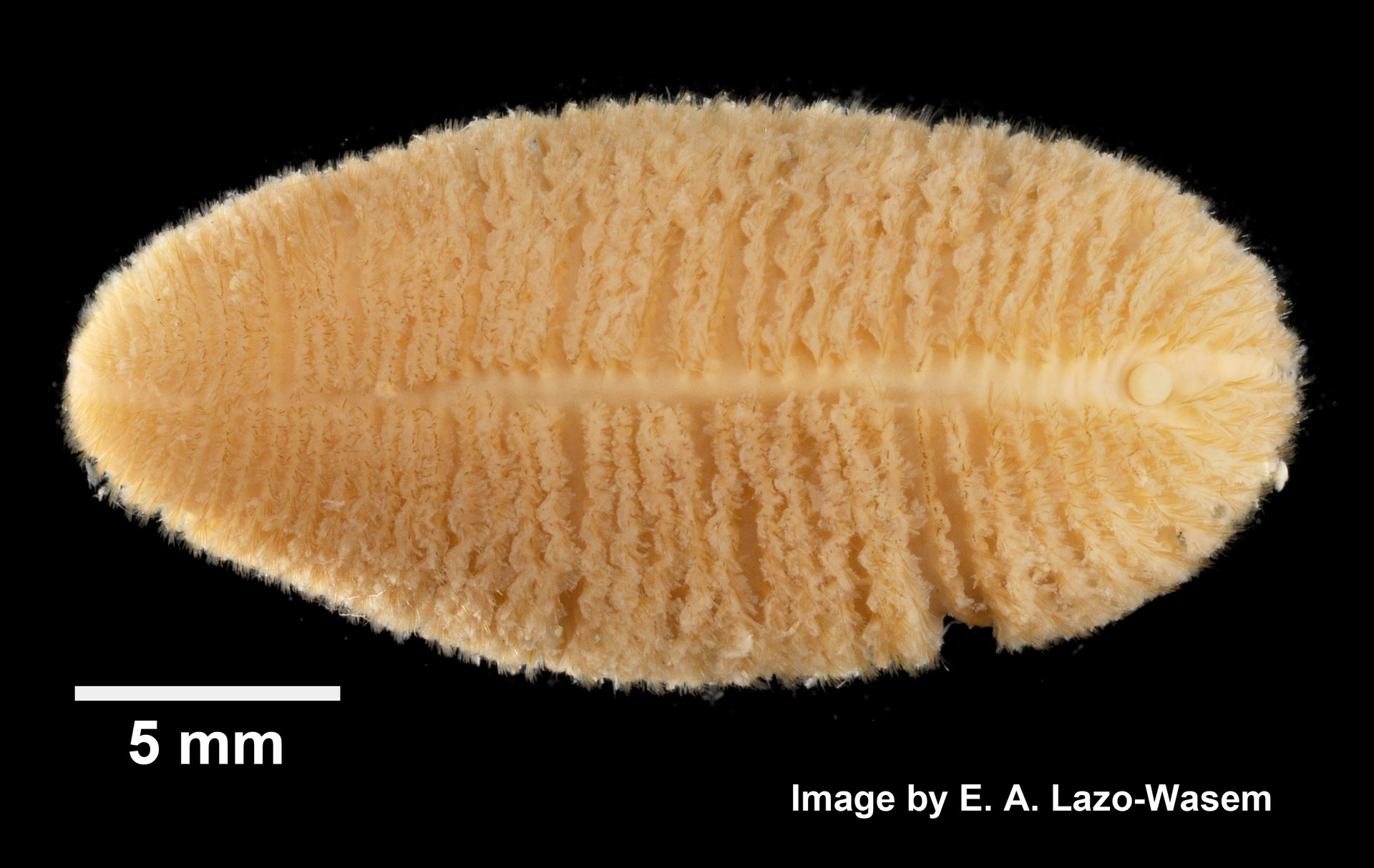
- Spinther citrinus

Scientific classification
- Kingdom: Animalia
- Phylum: Annelida
- Class: Polychaeta
- Order: incertae sedis
- Family: Spintheridae; Augener, 1913
- Genus: Spinther; Johnston, 1845

Species
- See text

= Spinther =

Genus of annelids

Spintheridae is a family of marine polychaete worms with a single genus, Spinther, containing these species:

- Spinther alaskensis Hartman, 1948
- Spinther arcticus (M. Sars, 1851) (includes Spinther miniaceus Grube, 1860)
- Spinther australiensis Augener, 1913
- Spinther citrinus (Stimpson, 1854)
- Spinther ericinus Yamamoto & Imajima, 1985
- Spinther hystrix Uschakov, 1950
- Spinther japonicus Imajima and Hartman, 1964
- Spinther oniscoides Johnston, 1845
- Spinther sagamiensis Imajima, 2003
- Spinther usarpia Hartman, 1967
- Spinther vegae Augener, 1928 (includes Spinther wireni Hartman, 1948)

The animal lives as a symbiont on sponges.

Johnston's paper does not explain the choice of the name, but ancient Greek σπινθήρ means "spark." In images of the living animal, it appears to be surrounded by a cloud of pinpoints of light.
