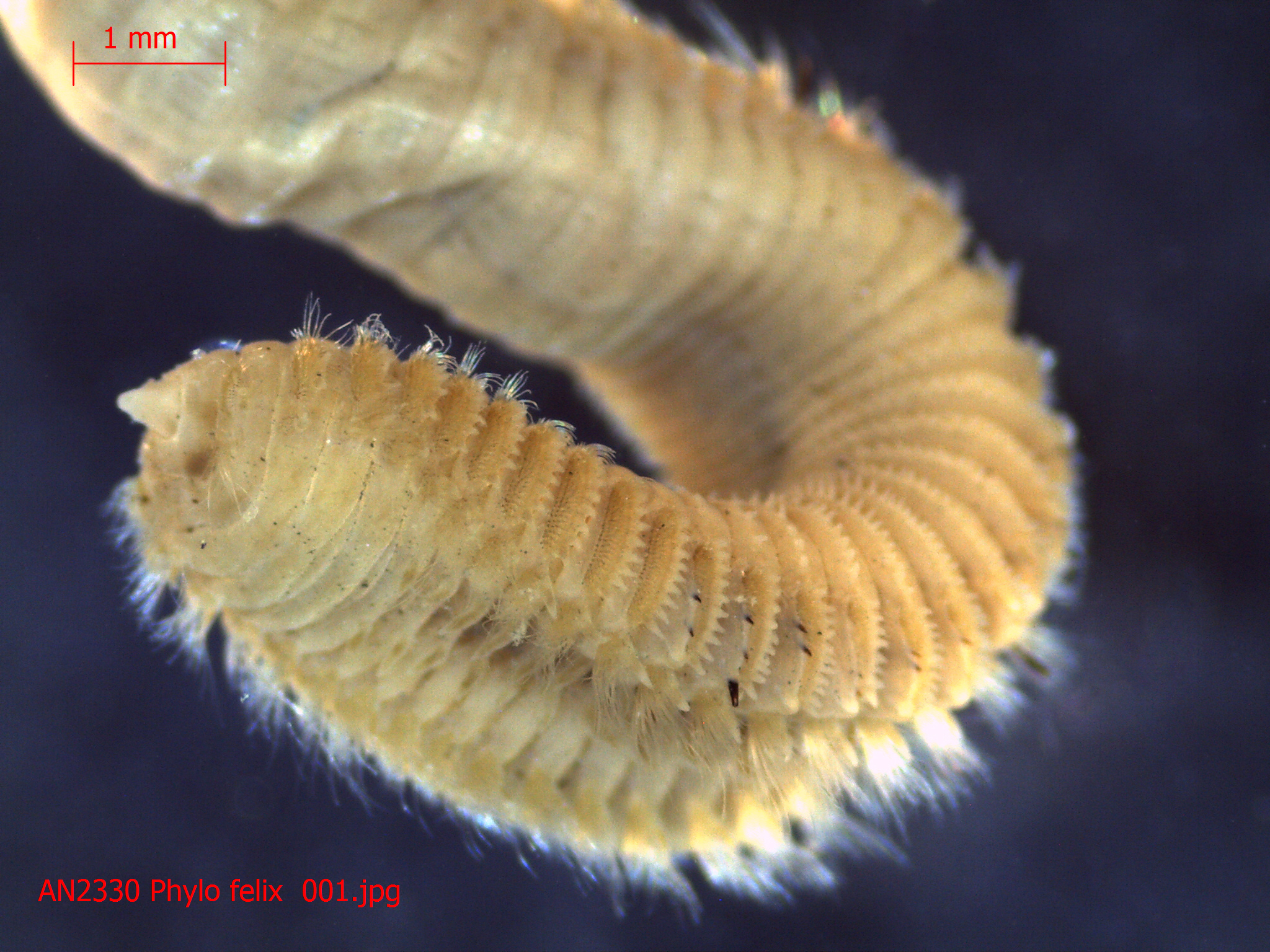
- The orbiniid worm Phylo felix

Scientific classification
- Kingdom: Animalia
- Phylum: Annelida
- Clade: Pleistoannelida
- Clade: Sedentaria
- Order: Orbiniida; Fauchald 1977 sensu Struck et al. 2015

Families
- Apharyngtus; Dinophilidae; Diurodrilidae; Nerillidae; Orbiniidae; Parergodrilidae

= Orbiniida =

Order of annelid worms

Orbiniida is an order of small polychaete worms in the phylum Annelida. It is the earliest diverging clade in Sedentaria. Along with Protodriliformia (in Errantia), this order is composed of meiofaunal marine worms formerly known as "archiannelids". These worms inhabit the marine interstitial ecosystem, the space between sand grains.

== Classification ==
First mentioned in 1977, Orbiniida was an order of the polyphyletic infraclass "Scolecida" of the class "Polychaeta". It was composed of the families Orbiniidae, Paraonidae and Questidae, all of which share in common the lack of antennae and palps, and the presence of an eversible pharynx and biramous parapodia with simple chaetae.

However, through phylogenetic analysis it was found that Questidae and Paraonidae are more closely related to Clitellata and Cirratulida respectively. Because of this, the taxonomic composition of Orbiniida was changed to exclude these two families and include several interstitial groups previously belonging to the polyphyletic "Archiannelida": Orbiniidae, Parergodrilidae, Nerillidae, Diurodrilidae, and Apharyngtus, and possibly Dinophilidae too.

== Evolutionary history ==
Phylogenetic analysis of annelids has found Orbiniida to be the earliest diverging clade of Sedentaria. At the same time, the other half of "archiannelid" worms, Protodriliformia, was found to be the earliest diverging clade of Errantia. The convergence between these two groups occurred through progenesis and miniaturization, as a way to adapt to the marine interstitial ecosystem between sand grains (i.e. interstitium). This means that the larval or juvenile stages of a larger pleistoannelid ancestor temporarily inhabiting the interstitium stopped their somatic growth, became sexually mature and stayed in the interstitium permanently.

- Pleistoannelida
  - Errantia
    - Aciculata
    - Protodriliformia
  - Sedentaria
    - Orbiniida
      - - - Orbiniidae
          - Parergodrilidae
        - - Diurodrilidae
          - Apharyngtus
      - - Dinophilidae
        - Nerillidae
    - other Sedentaria

Although Dinophilidae possibly belongs to Orbiniida, a more recent analysis recovered several times the clade Dinophiliformia, containing the genera in Dinophilidae, as sister group to Sedentaria+Errantia. This would imply a third separate lineage of interstitial, miniaturized worms.
