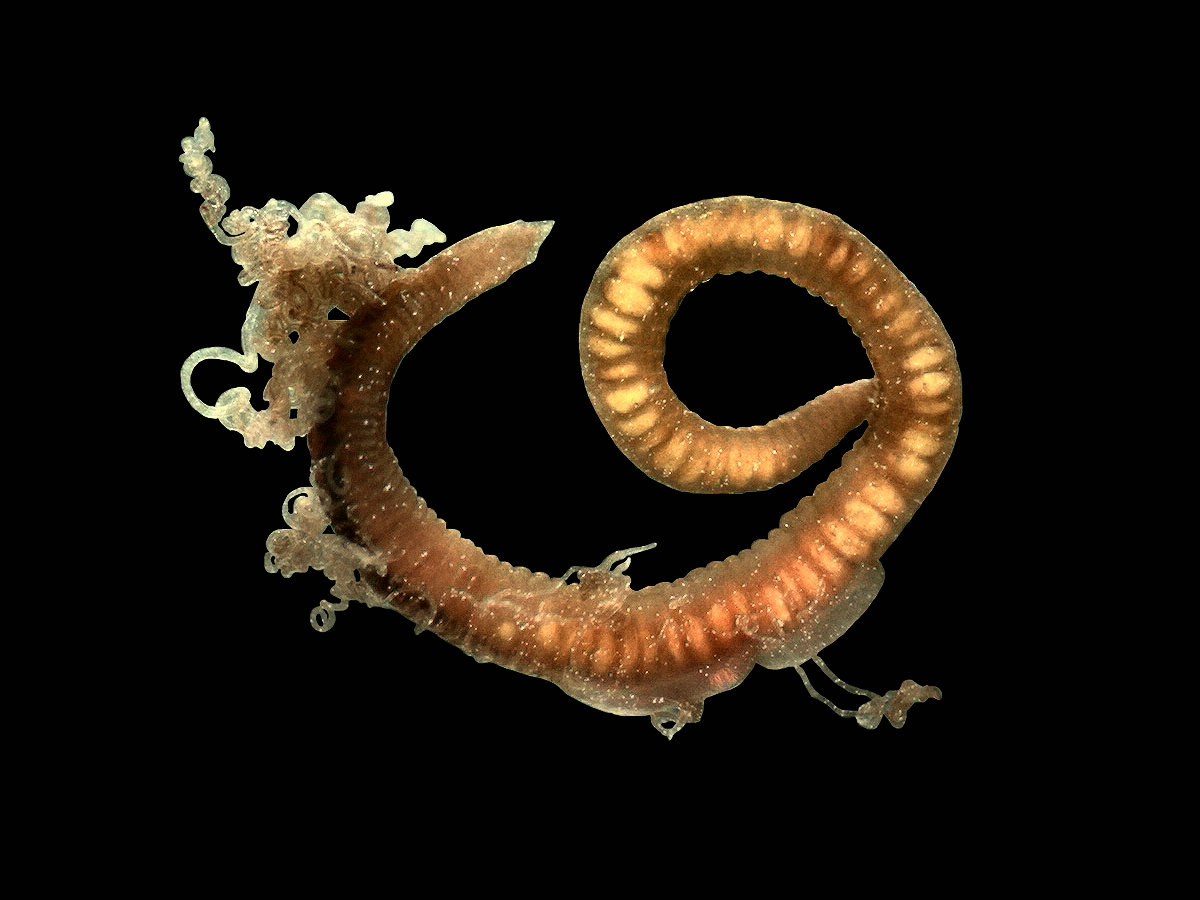
- Cirratulus cirratus

Scientific classification
- Kingdom: Animalia
- Phylum: Annelida
- Class: Polychaeta
- Order: Cirratulida

= Cirratulida =

Order of worms

Cirratulida is an order of polychaetes belonging to the class Polychaeta.

Families:

- Cirratulidae Carus, 1863
- Paraonidae Cerruti, 1909
