= Saccocirridae =

Scientific classification
- Domain: Eukaryota
- Kingdom: Animalia
- Phylum: Annelida
- Class: Polychaeta
- Order: incertae sedis
- Family: Saccocirridae; Czerniavsky, 1881

Genera
- Pharyngocirrus Di Domenico, Martínez, Lana & Worsaae, 2014; Saccocirrus Bobretzky, 1872

Family of annelids

The Saccocirridae are small interstitial polychaetes common in coarse sand on reflective, surf beaches, usually within the zone of retention. Saccocirridae have a worldwide distribution and many more species likely remain to be described. These polychates are usually between 2 and 10 millimetres (0.08 and 0.39 in) in length and 500 μm wide. They have reduced parapodia and are considered a true interstitial species, incapable of burrowing through finer sediments.

== Morphology ==
Based on Saccocirrus sonomacus from the Pacific Coast of the Americas, the prostomium supports a pair of grooved palps that have a primarily sensory purpose. A pair of eyes are also present. The peristomium is probably reduced to a circumoral ring. The pygidium is usually bilobed.
