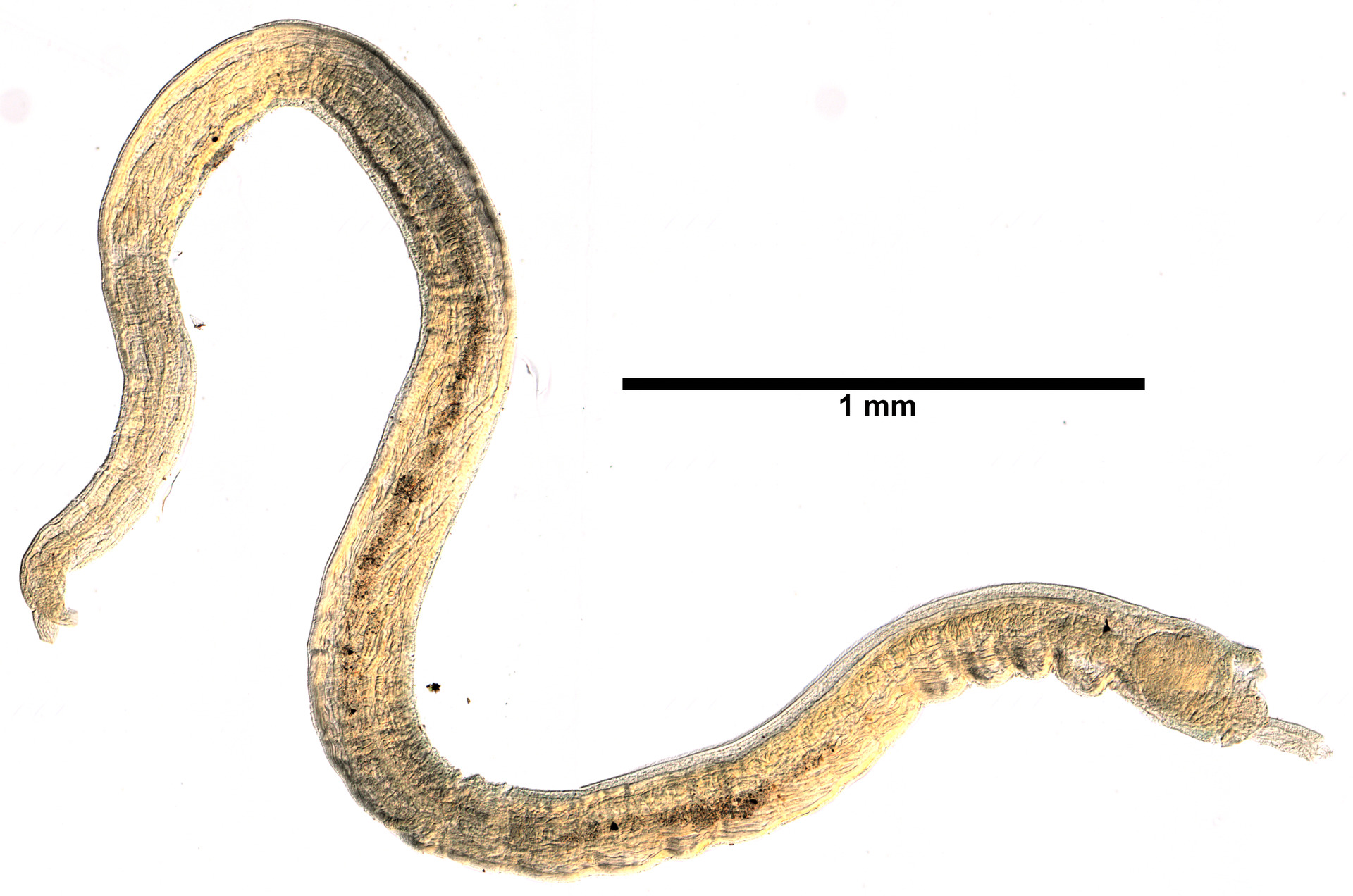
- Protodrilus mirabilis

Scientific classification
- Domain: Eukaryota
- Kingdom: Animalia
- Phylum: Annelida
- Class: Polychaeta
- Order: Protodrilida

= Protodrilida =

Order of annelid worms

Protodrilida is an order of polychaetes belonging to the class Polychaeta.

Families:

- Protodrilidae Czerniavsky, 1881
- Protodriloididae Purschke & Jouin, 1988
