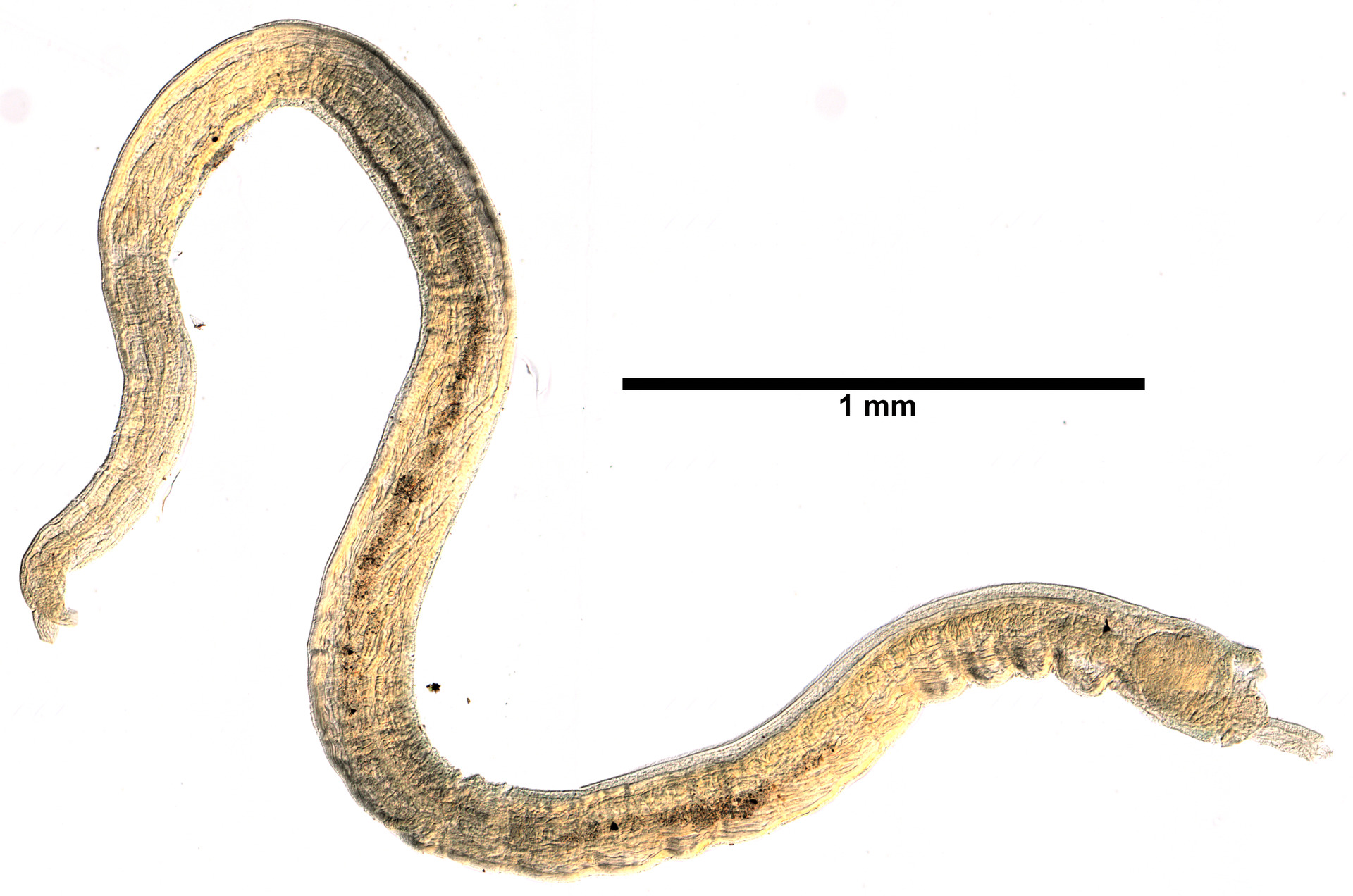
- Protodrilus mirabilis

Scientific classification
- Domain: Eukaryota
- Kingdom: Animalia
- Phylum: Annelida
- Class: Polychaeta
- Order: Protodrilida
- Family: Protodrilidae

= Protodrilidae =

Family of annelid worms

Protodrilidae is a family of polychaetes belonging to the order Protodrilida.

Genera:

- Astomus Jouin, 1979
- Claudrilus Martínez, Di Domenico, Rouse & Worsaae, 2015
- Lindrilus Martínez, Di Domenico, Rouse & Worsaae, 2015
- Megadrilus Martınez, Di Domenico, Rouse & Worsaae, 2015
- Meiodrilus Martínez, Di Domenico, Rouse & Worsaae, 2015
- Parentodrilus Jouin, 1992
- Protannelis Lam, 1922
- Protodrilus Czerniavsky, 1881
- Protodrilus Hatschek, 1881
