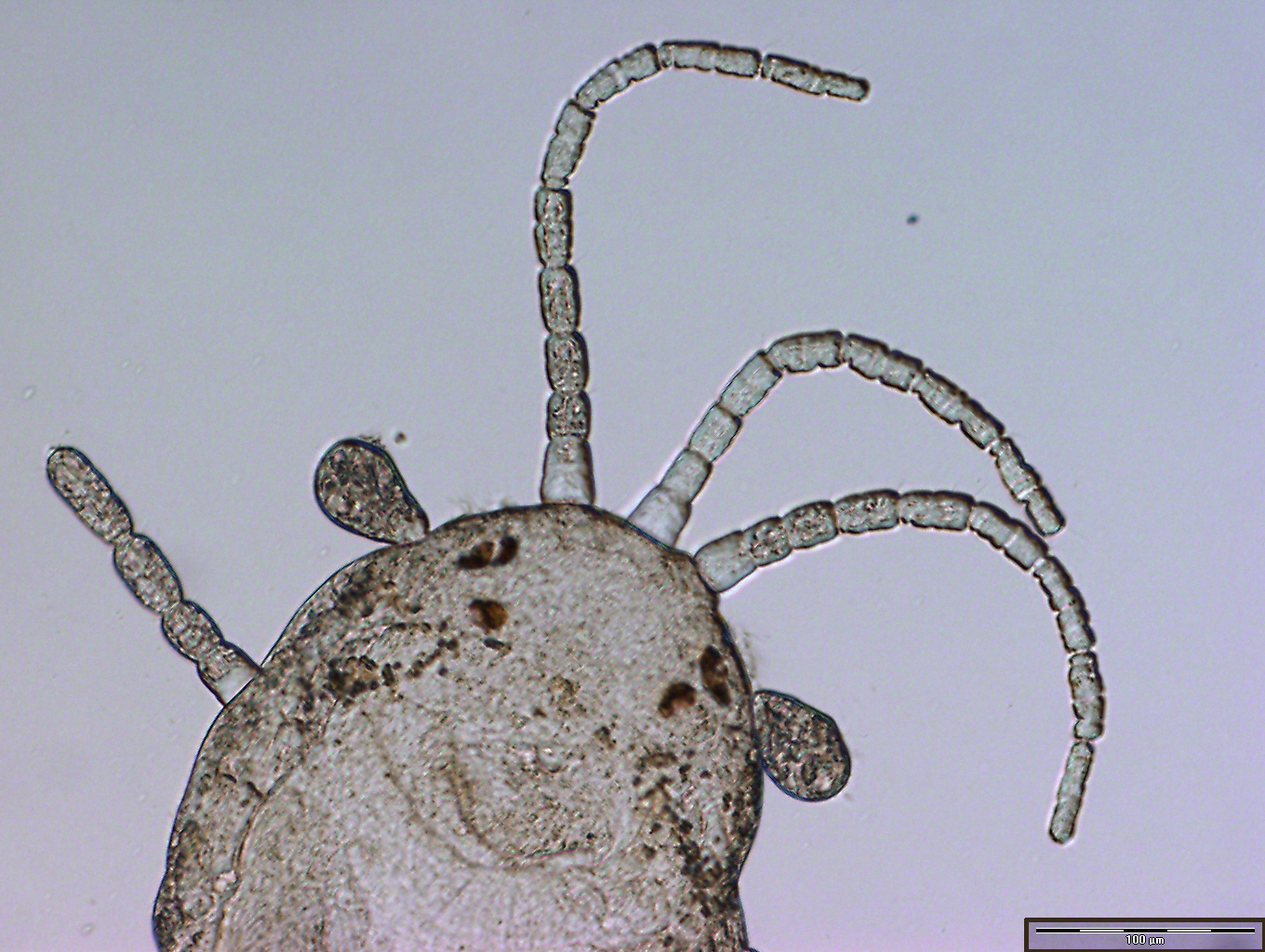

Scientific classification
- Domain: Eukaryota
- Kingdom: Animalia
- Phylum: Annelida
- Class: Polychaeta
- Order: Haplodrili
- Family: Nerillidae; Levinsen, 1883

Genera
- see text

= Nerillidae =

Family of annelids

The Nerillidae are a family of invertebrates containing these genera:

- Meganerilla
- Mesonerilla
- Nerilla
- Nerillidium
- Nerillidopsis
- Paranerilla
- Psammoriedlia
- Thalassochaetus
- Troglochaetus
