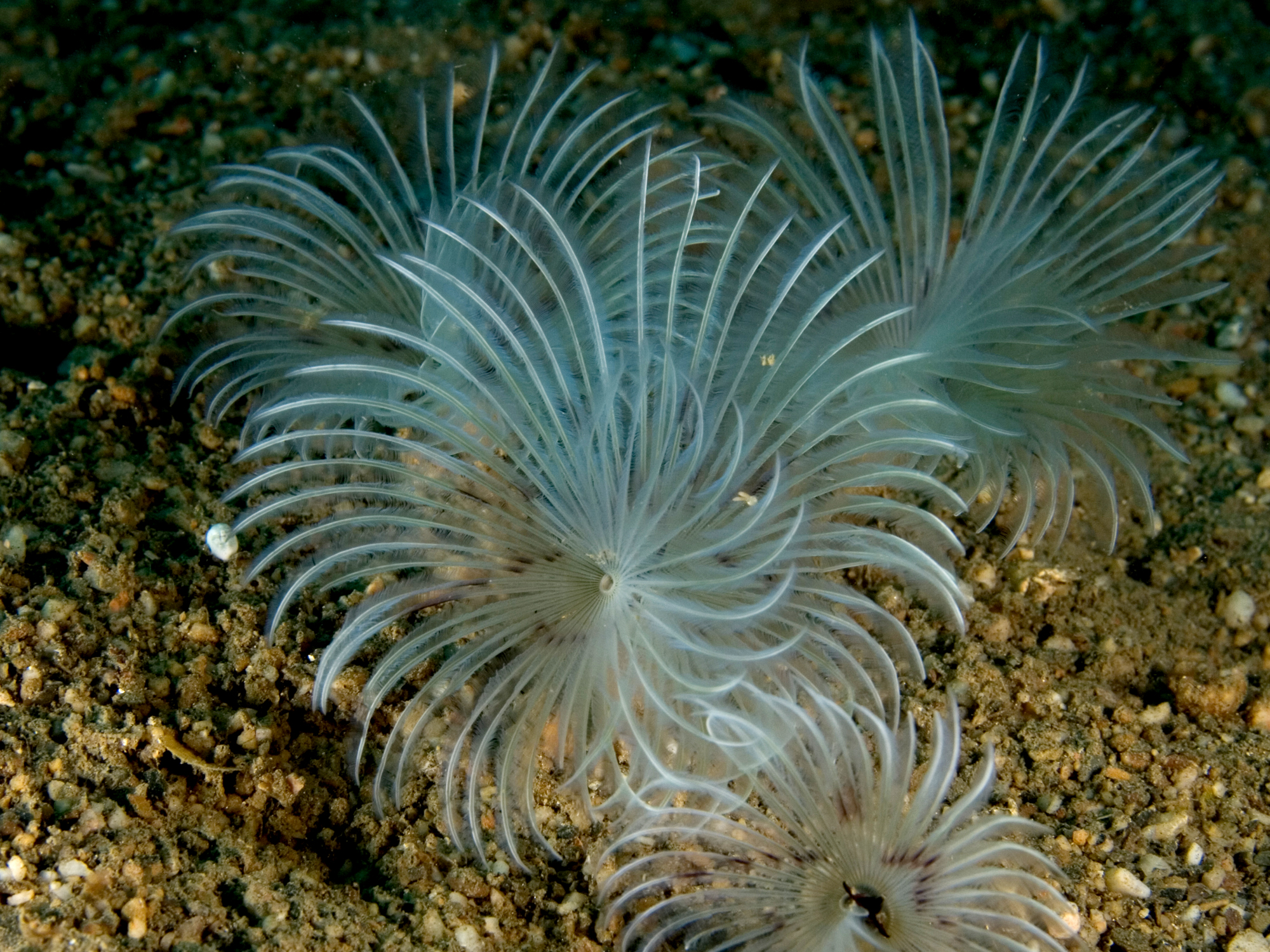
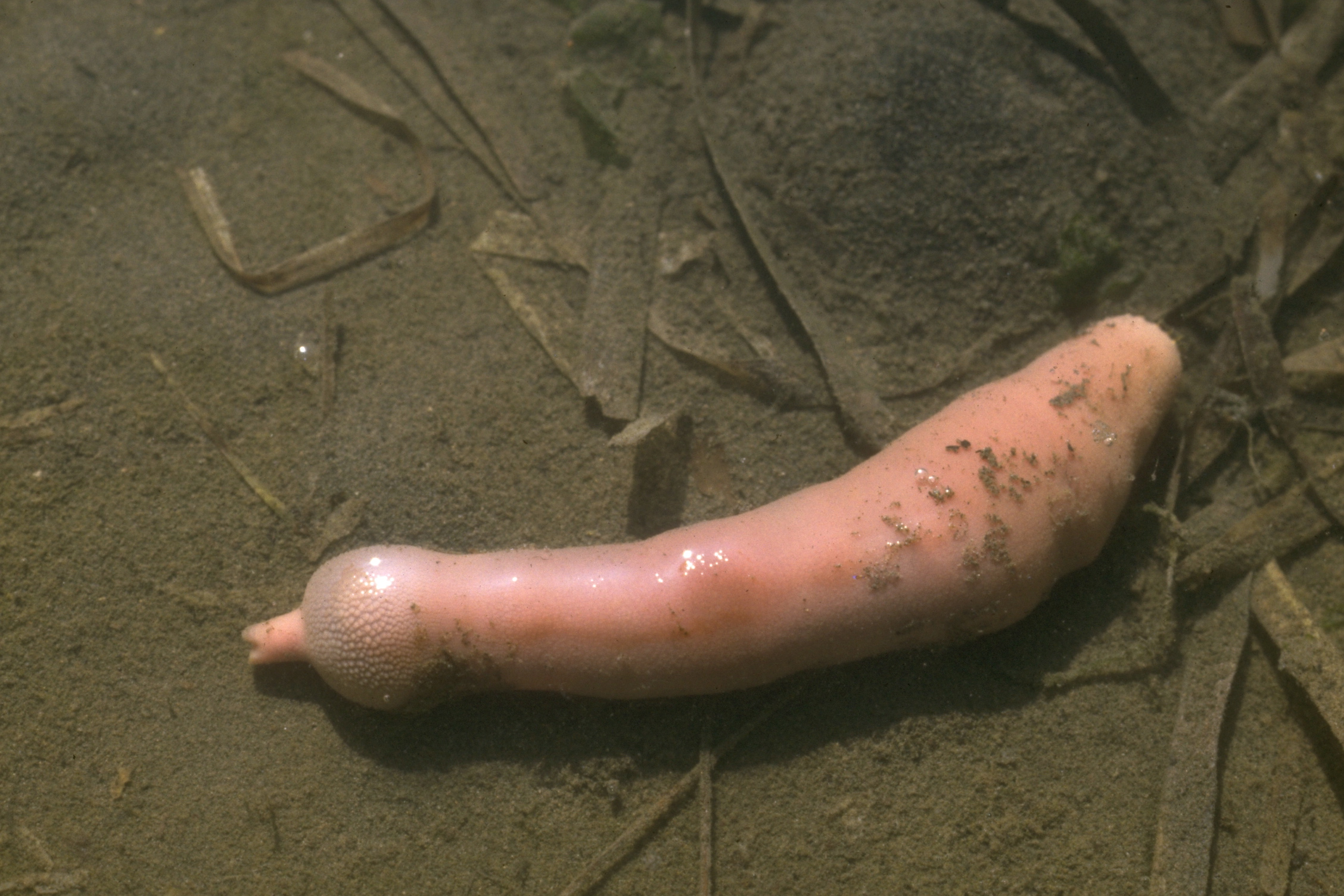
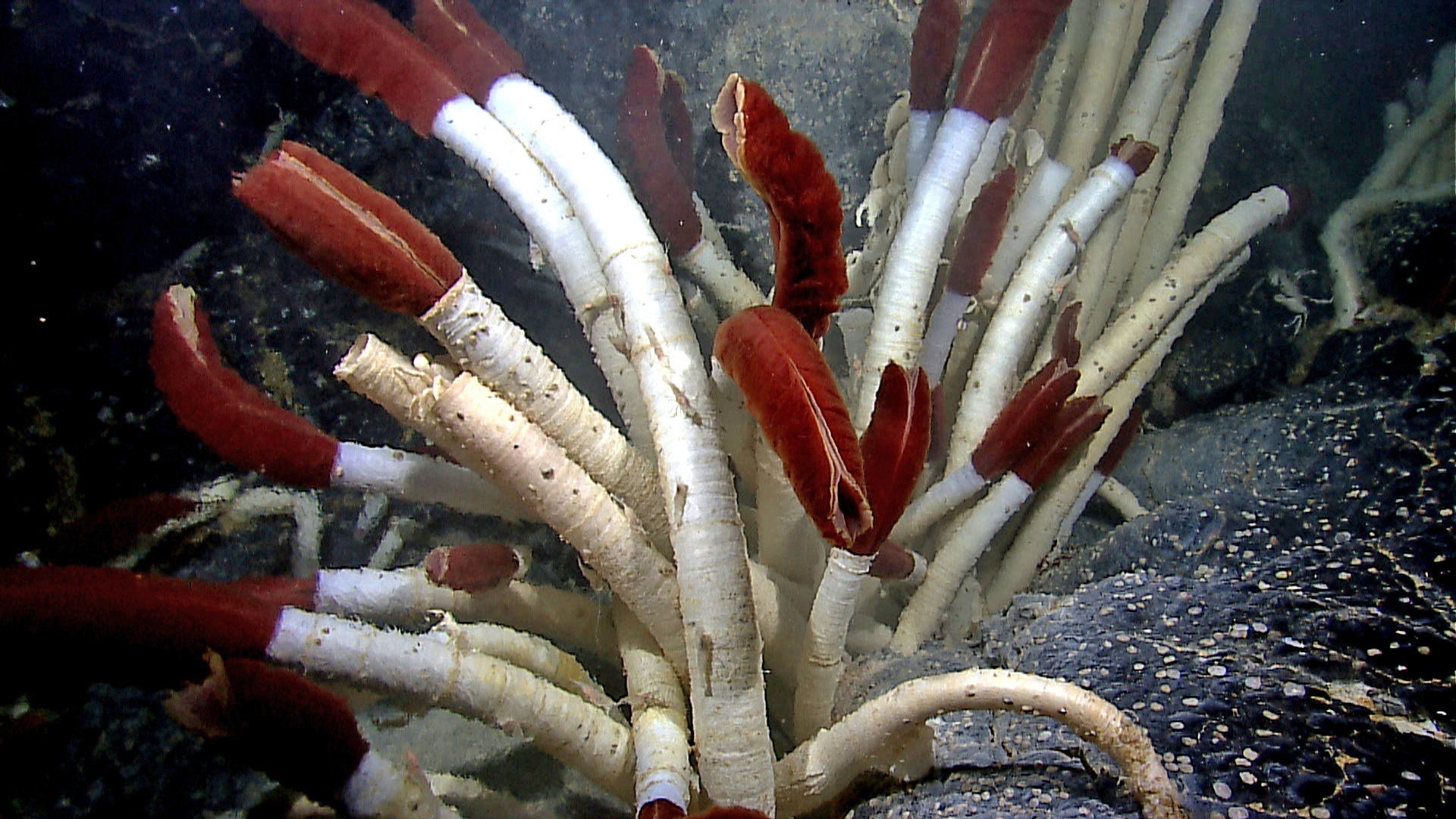
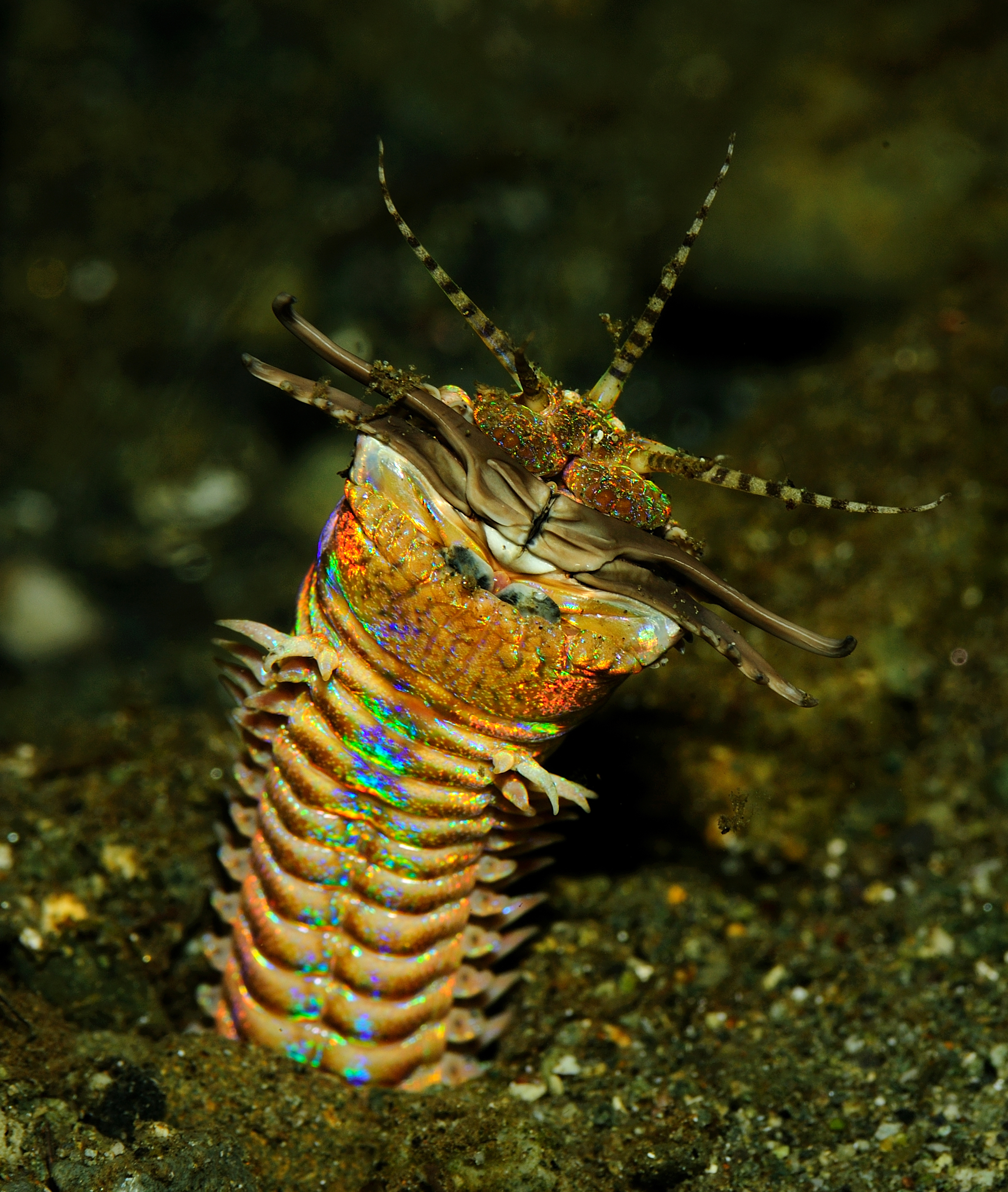
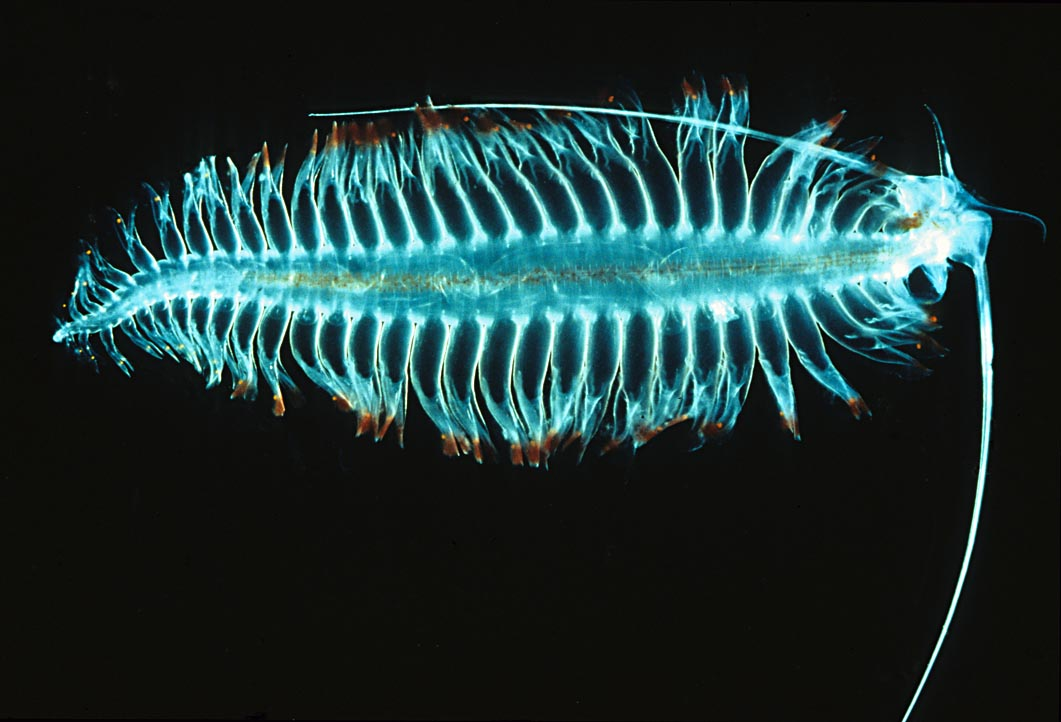
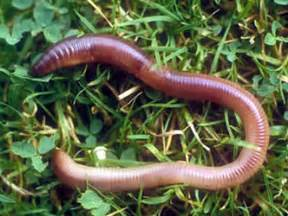
- Examples of Pleistoannelida (clockwise from upper left corner): Sabellida, Echiura, Eunicida, Clitellata, Phyllodocida, Siboglinidae.

Scientific classification
- Kingdom: Animalia
- Clade: Spiralia
- Superphylum: Lophotrochozoa
- Phylum: Annelida
- Clade: Pleistoannelida; Struck 2011

Clades
- Errantia; Aciculata; Eunicida; Phyllodocida; Protodriliformia; Polygordiidae; Protodrilida; Sedentaria; Orbiniida; Cirratuliformia; Siboglinidae (=Pogonophora); Sabellida; Spionida; Opheliida; Capitellida; Echiura; Capitellidae; Terebelliformia; Maldanomorpha; Psammodrilidae; Clitellata; Incertae sedis: Myzostomida; Spinther; Aberranta

= Pleistoannelida =

Pleistoannelida Temporal range: Cambrian Stage 3–Present

Clade of annelid worms

Pleistoannelida is a group of annelid worms that comprises the vast majority of the diversity in phylum Annelida. Discovered through phylogenetic analyses, it is the largest clade of annelids, comprised by the last common ancestor of the highly diverse sister groups Errantia and Sedentaria (Clitellata and related polychaetes) and all the descendants of that ancestor. Most groups in the clade find their ancestors within the Cambrian explosion when Annelid diversity expanded dramatically. The Pleistoannelida clade covers a variety of traits. However, the evolution of simple to complex eyes, developed papillae for burrowing, and for some specialized radioles for feeding can be seen universally across every species. New findings have discovered the range of Annelid diversity have led to uncertainty if groups with developed ancestral traits should remain within the clade. Furthermore, there's been a lack of recently discovered Annelid traits being used in the categorization of groups within the clade, leading to many hypotheses on how to do so and which should remain within the clade. Currently three smaller clades that were originally a part of the groups Errantia and Sedentaria have been proven to fall outside while still being connected to the basal groups.

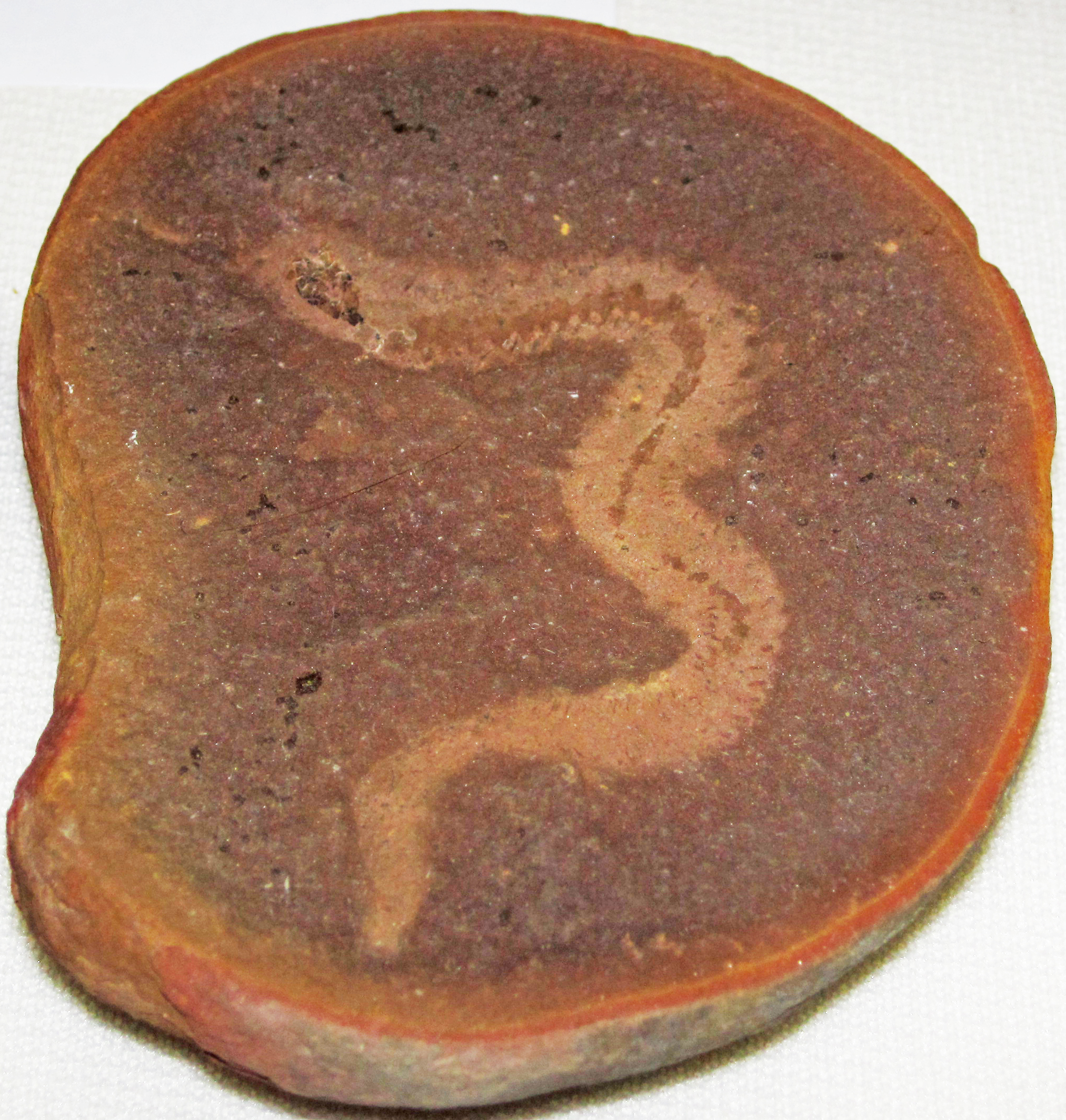
Half of a fossil containing the species of worm Esconites zelus.

== Etymology ==
Pleisto ("Most") + annelid ("little rings"), "Most of the segmented worms." Pleisto is the superlative of "poly," meaning "many," and annelid is the phylum containing segmented ("ringed") worms. As mentioned above, the vast diversity of the annelid phylum mostly fall within this clade- hence why it was given this name.

== Phylogeny ==
Pleistoannelida is composed by two big clades: Errantia (eunicids, phyllodocids and related polychaetes) and Sedentaria (spoon worms, tubeworms, clitellates and related polychaetes). There are also smaller groups of difficult placement, such as Myzostomida and Spintheridae, that belong to either one of them. Closely related to Pleistoannelida is a grade of basal annelids: the Amphinomida/Sipunculida/Lobatocerebrum clade, Chaetopterida (Chaetopteridae, Psammodrilidae and Apistobranchidae) and Palaeoannelida. The clade Amphinomida was once originally included within Errantia, but has since been removed into its own taxa.

A possible, closer sister group to Pleistoannelida could be Dinophiliformia, a clade containing interstitial (meiofaunal) genera previously found in Orbiniida (Sedentaria).

- Annelida
  - Palaeoannelida
  - - Chaetopterida
    - - - Amphinomida
        - - Lobatocerebrum
          - Sipunculida
      - - ?
          Dinophiliformia
        - Pleistoannelida
          - Errantia
            - Aciculata
              - Eunicida
              - Phyllodocida
            - Protodriliformia
          - ?
            Myzostomida
          - ?
            Spinther
          - ?
            Aberranta
          - Sedentaria
            - Orbiniida
            - - - - Cirratuliformia
                  - Siboglinidae
                - - Sabellida
                  - Spionida
              - - - Opheliida
                  - Capitellida
                    - Echiura
                    - Capitellidae
                - - - Terebelliformia
                    - Maldanomorpha
                  - Clitellata

A 2019 analysis recovered the mesozoan group Orthonectida as the sister group to Pleistoannelida. However, a more recent 2022 analysis found a monophyletic Mesozoa (Orthonectida+Dicyemida clade) localized outside of the annelids, between Gnathifera and Platyhelminthes.

== Research ==
=== Morphological ===
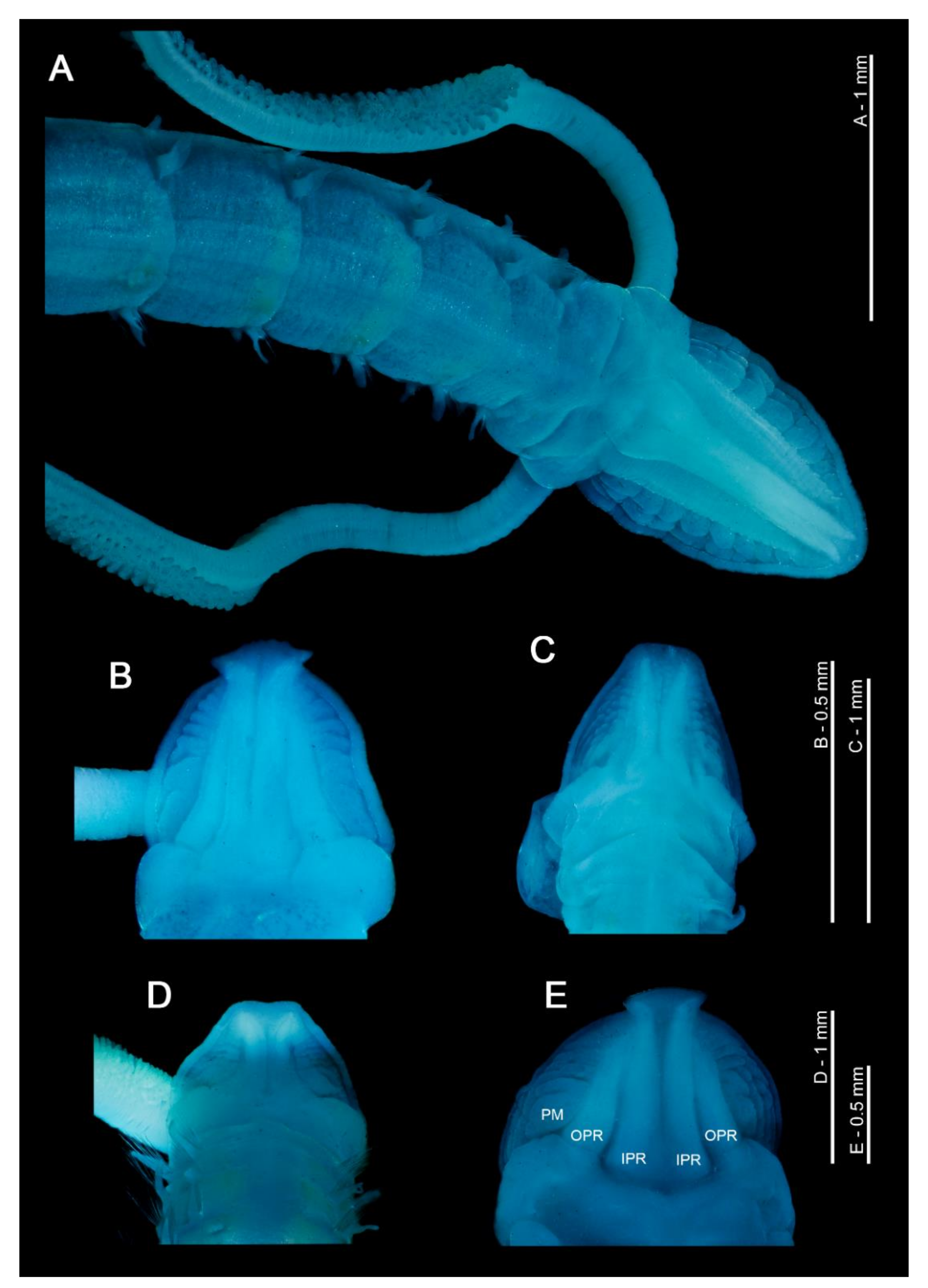
(A) Anterior end of Magelona mirabilis, showing prostomium, palps, achaetous first segment and first five chaetigers (dorsal view)

There has been research conducted to help determine the taxonomy of the clade Pleistoannelida. The research includes the morphological characteristics of the clade as well as the phylum Annelida as a whole. For example, there are studies of gene expression in annelids. It was supported that larval eyes of annelids are considered homologous to pigmented eyes of other bilaterians. It is believed that annelid adult eyes evolved in a common ancestor of Pleistoannelida. Besides the eyes, it has also been studied that commissures in the brain, glanglia, and nuchal organs were to have also evolved in the lineage of Pleistonannelida by observing Magelona mirabilis.

=== Genetic ===
There has been much research done on the genetics of Pleistoannelida and Annelida as a whole to determine the phylogeny of the clade, because many taxa do not share ancestral characteristics. Genetic studies have led to the current phylogenetic tree, which separates the clade into the two sister groups of Errantia and Sedentaria. Genetic data was also used in the placement of groups of Myzostomida, Nerilliade, and Aberranta within Pleistoannelida. These groups were previously thought to be anywhere from annelids to flatworms, but genetics studies have found strong evidence to place them solidly in Annelida, with the closest relations to groups in the clade Pleistoannelida. The most current research puts Myzostomida in Errantia, however the data is not strong enough to make this a certainty. Research places Nerillidae closest to Eunicida (supported by certain morphology) and places Aberranta near Nerillidae or syllids and nereidids.

At a cellular level, it was found that the highly conserved mitochondrial gene order could be only depicted to the clade Pleistoannelida.
