= Salvatoria koorineclavata =

Scientific classification
- Kingdom: Animalia
- Phylum: Annelida
- Clade: Pleistoannelida
- Subclass: Errantia
- Order: Phyllodocida
- Family: Syllidae
- Genus: Salvatoria
- Species: S. koorineclavata

Binomial name
- Salvatoria koorineclavata San Martín, 2005

Species of annelid

Salvatoria koorineclavata is a species belonging to the phylum Annelida, a group known as the segmented worms. A related species in Australia has been described as Brania clavata and subsequently as Salvatoria clavata. While similar, the Australian species has a longer pharynx and proventricle; at the same time, blades of chaetae are present in the Australian species, with longer and upwards curved spines, which are straight in S. clavata; its pharyngeal tooth is located more anteriorly than in S. clavata. Other global species, like those in the genus Brania, are also similar to S. koorineclavata. Salvatoria californiensis has similar chaetae, with shorter spines and less developed teeth. Its acicula lacks a defined acute tip, and the proventricle is quite shorter, running through 5 segments in S. koorineclavata, with fewer rows of muscle cells (21–22 in koorineclavata). The species name comes from an Aboriginal word, Koorine, meaning "daughter", due to the similarity of the Australian species to the European species of S. clavata.

== Description ==
The species' body is small, its holotype possesses natatory chaetae, with a total length of 2 millimetres (0.079 in) and width of 0.27 millimetres (0.011 in), including about 27 chaetigers. Its prostomium is ovate, showing 4 thick eyes in a trapezoidal arrangement, as well as 2 eyespots. Its antennae are spindle-shaped, its median antenna longer than its lateral antennae. The palps are similar in length to the prostomium or somewhat shorter, dorsally fused by a membrane, and containing a small distal notch, sometimes folded.

It carries two ciliated nuchal organs between its prostomium and peristomium, the latter being similar in length to the adjacent segments. Its tentacular cirri and antennae are alike, but longer, the dorsal pair relatively the same in length to the lateral antennae. The species' dorsal cirri are spindle-shaped, present on all chaetigers, with those of chaetiger 1 being slightly longer.

It shows bidentate blades within compound chaetae, both teeth with long, distally directed thin spines, which are longer in the dorsalmost chaetae. Its anterior parapodia count with about 9–10 compound chaetae, exhibiting dorsoventral gradation in length, being 26μm above and 12–13 μm below. The number of posterior compound chaetae declines to a number of 5–6 on the posterior parapodia. Salvatoria koorineclavata shows ventral simple chaetae on the majority of posterior parapodia of some specimens. Its anterior parapodia possess 2 aciculae each, one straight and one acuminate, while simultaneously showing solitary acicula in its midbody.

The pharynx is long, spanning approximately 4 to 5 segments. Its pharyngeal tooth is small and rhomboidal, without papillae on its opening. Its proventricle is similar in length to the pharynx, with 21–22 muscle cell rows. Its pygidium is small, with 2 anal cirri, similar to its dorsal cirri but rather longer.

== Distribution ==
Salvatoria koorineclavata is thought to habitat the entire Australian continent, however the holotypes were initially found throughout the southern coast of Australia, from Jervis Bay, New South Wales to Kalbarri, Western Australia. It is common in shallow waters on several substrates, up to a depth of 29 metres (95 ft).
