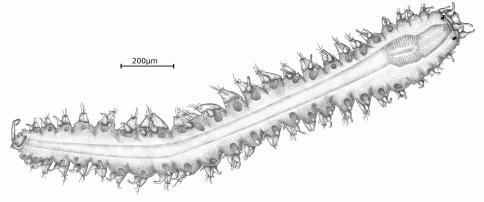
- Sphaerosyllis levantina holotype, dorsal view

Scientific classification
- Kingdom: Animalia
- Phylum: Annelida
- Clade: Pleistoannelida
- Subclass: Errantia
- Order: Phyllodocida
- Family: Syllidae
- Genus: Sphaerosyllis
- Species: S. levantina

Binomial name
- Sphaerosyllis levantina Faulwetter et al., 2011

= Sphaerosyllis levantina =

Species of annelid worm

Sphaerosyllis levantina is a species belonging to the phylum Annelida, a group known as the segmented worms. It was first described from Haifa Bay in the eastern Mediterranean. It is similar to Sphaerosyllis hystrix, and is thought to show a cosmopolitan distribution. Its name derives from its type locality (Levantine Basin), levantina being the feminine form of a Neo-Latin adjective meaning "pertaining to the region where the sun raises"; the adjective is feminine to agree with the feminine genus name, Syllis being a river nymph in Greek mythology.

While Faulwetter et al. researched the soft bottom benthos of Haifa Bay, several individuals of the Sphaerosyllis exhibited features which did not correspond to any known Sphaerosyllis species. These characteristics were: falcigers with prominent serration and with a subdistal spine present in all chaetigers; a subdistal spine on the blades of some of its falcigers (also found in S. hystrix and S. boeroi). The authors then re-examined material of Sphaerosyllis hystrix from previous finds, which revealed some individuals possessed a subdistal spine on the blades of anterior falcigers and also in posterior chaetigers. To clarify the relationship between the new specimens and the 2 described species possessing falcigers with a subdistal spine, the scientists conducted a morphometric analysis.

== Description ==
The animal counts with 25 chaetigers over a length of 1.9 millimetres (0.075 in) with palps but without anal cirri. Its width at its sixth chaetiger is 250μm without parapodia. It has a small and thin body, widest at its proventricle. It shows irregular dorsal papillation on its anterior chaetigers, while its ventrum does not show papillation. Its prostomium is wider than long, with 4 coalescent lensed eyes arranged trapezoidally; anterior eyespots are absent. It counts with pyriform antennae with bulbous bases and elongated tips, its median antenna measuring 40 μm long, while lateral ones measure 33 μm, which is longer than its prostomium and palps together. Its median antenna is inserted between its anterior pair of eyes, the lateral ones attached on the anterior margin of its prostomium. The animal's palps are ventrally-directed, fused along their length and with a dorsal notch and few small papillae.

Its peristomium shows a dorsal fold partly covering the prostomium. It counts with one pair of tentacular cirri, which are shaped like the antennae but are shorter. Its second chaetiger lacks dorsal cirri but has a large papilla instead. The dorsal cirri are shaped similarly to the tentacular cirri. Its ventral cirri are conical and half as long as its parapodial lobe. Its anterior parapodia possess 4 to 5 (in rare cases 6) falcigers per fascicle; its blades are thin and unidentate, with their lengths showing dorso-ventral gradation, dorsal ones measuring a maximum of 14 μm, while ventral ones 10 μm. Posterior dorsal blades have a similar length 13 μm.

Sphaerosyllis levantina's ventral simple chaeta on the posterior chaetigers are sigmoid and smooth. Anteriorly, the parapodium exhibit two aciculae, one distally bent at a right angle, with an acuminate tip, the other being straight and blunt; posterior parapodium shows only one acicula as previously described. Its pharynx occupies three chaetigers, with a width spanning more than ¾ of the width of the proventricle. Its pharyngeal tooth is located on its anterior margin, surrounded by a crown of soft papillae. The proventricle possesses 15 to 17 muscle cell rows. The pygidium is papillated, with two anal cirri twice as long as the dorsal cirri.

Sphaerosyllis levantina and Sphaerosyllis minima are alike, by having serrated blades of falcigers throughout the body. S. minima, however has a stronger dorso-ventral gradation of the falcigers' blades. Sphaerosyllis capensis, Sphaerosyllis taylori, and Sphaerosyllis sandrae also show similarities with S. levantina, especially with regards to the shape and serration of the falcigers' blades, but S. capensis has all antennae positioned in line, and S. taylori shows no dorso-ventral gradation of the falciger blade length, while S. sandrae has smooth falcigerous blades posteriorly and parapodial glands with hyaline material. All of these species differ from Sphaerosyllis levantina by lacking a subdistal spine on the falcigers' blades. Three species of Sphaerosyllis are known to possess this spine: S. hystrix, Sphaerosyllis parabulbosa and S. boeroi. S. parabulbosa differs from S. levantina by carrying minuscule dorsal cirri and antennae, by the exhibiting a subdistal spine only the posterior falcigers' blades and by the smooth blades of its posterior falcigers. S. boeroi, in turn, differs from S. levantina in having significantly longer falciger blades, which simultaneously show more pronounced dorso-ventral gradation. S. hystrix can be distinguished from S. levantina by showing smooth or finely serrated posterior falcigers, even when the spine is present. Concomitantly, blades of the dorsalmost falcigers show anteroposterior gradation in length in hystrix, whereas in levantina they are of similar length throughout its body. S. hystrix also possesses a considerably narrower pharynx.

== Distribution ==
Sphaerosyllis levantina was found in fine to medium sands in Haifa Bay, at a depth of 10.5 metres (34 ft). Its distribution includes the Israeli coast (Levantine Basin).
