= Pionosyllis serratisetosa =

Scientific classification
- Kingdom: Animalia
- Phylum: Annelida
- Clade: Pleistoannelida
- Subclass: Errantia
- Order: Phyllodocida
- Family: Syllidae
- Genus: Pionosyllis
- Species: P. serratisetosa

Binomial name
- Pionosyllis serratisetosa López, San Martín & Jiménez, 1997

Species of annelid

Pionosyllis serratisetosa is a polychaete from the family Syllidae. The body of the worm exists as a head, a cylindrical, segmented body ending in a tail. The head consists of a prostomium and peristomium and a pair of appendages (palp, antennae and cirri).

Pionosyllis serratisetosa was first described by Lòpez, San Martín & Jiménez.
