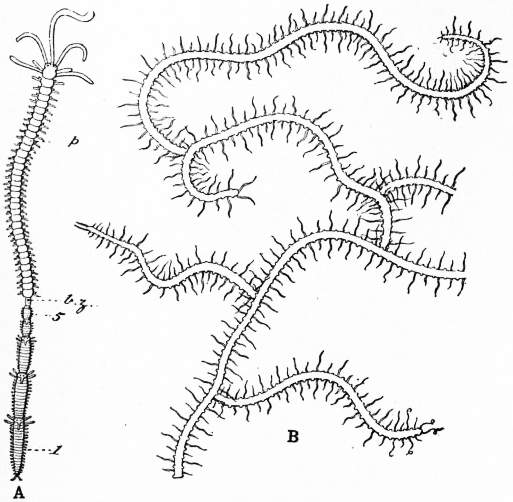
- Syllis ramosa (on right)

Scientific classification
- Kingdom: Animalia
- Phylum: Annelida
- Clade: Pleistoannelida
- Subclass: Errantia
- Order: Phyllodocida
- Family: Syllidae
- Genus: Cladosyllis; Aguado, Ponz-Segrelles, Schulze, Jimi, Tilic, Helm, van der Sprong, de Voogd, 2006
- Species: C. ramosa

Binomial name
- Cladosyllis ramosa (McIntosh, 1879)

= Cladosyllis =

Monotypic genus of annelid worm

Cladosyllis is a monotypic genus of polychaete worm belonging to the family Syllidae. Cladosyllis is closely related to Ramisyllis, together with which it displays a branching body plan with a single head and multiple posterior ends.

The genus contains only the species Cladosyllis ramosa, formerly known as Syllis ramosa, the first species of branching syllid discovered, and is thought to include more species that are yet to be described.

The species is found in the deep sea where it lives within the tissues of a sponge. It was the first branching polychaete worm to be discovered, with each worm having a single head and multiple anuses.

== History ==
During the period 1872 to 1876, the Royal Navy's HMS Challenger was used in the Challenger expedition to survey and explore the world's oceans. One of the unknown animals dredged from the ocean depths near the Philippines was a species of sponge which was found to contain numerous branching worms inside its cavities. In 1879, one of these worms was formally described by the Scottish marine biologist William Carmichael McIntosh, who named it Syllis ramosa. Branching polychaete worms were previously unknown.

== Distribution and ecology ==
Worms belonging to the genus Cladosyllis inhabit hexactinellid sponges of the genus Crateromorpha at depths between 165 and 1000m. They have been recorded in several Indo-Pacific regions including the Philippines, Tayandu Islands in the Arafura Sea, Okinawa, Sagami, Suruga Bay and Fukutoku seamount (Japan) and in the Tasman Sea.

=== Distribution ===
This bristle worm was first discovered living commensally with a sponge at a depth of about 250 m (820 ft) near the Philippines and at a depth of 170 m (560 ft) in the Arafura Sea. Further branching worms have occasionally been found in different locations and have been ascribed to S. ramosa despite subtle differences in morphology; they are hard to examine because of the difficulty of extracting them from the sponge tissue. However a new species of branching worm (Ramisyllis multicaudata) was described in 2012.

=== Ecology ===
The heads of the two individual S. ramosa brought to the surface by the Challenger were located in the bases of glass sponges of the class Hexactinellida. The rest of the worms' bodies were in the passages of the sponges. The bodies branched repeatedly so that each worm had a single head and many anuses.

S. ramosa is a "stolonate" worm and has an unusual life cycle. The terminal portion of a branch is known as a "stolon", and develops an extra head with large eyes and no mouth. The gut in this part of the animal is absorbed, the muscles are rearranged to facilitate swimming and the stolon becomes a storage receptacle for the eggs or sperm. When the breeding period arrives, the stolon becomes detached and swims to the surface of the sea, in a process termed "epitoky". Here the gametes are released and the stolon dies. Meanwhile, the parent worm remains safely in its sponge home and produces more stolons.

== Description ==
Branching segments in Cladosyllis emerge from the side of the segment, at the usual placement of a parapodium, unlike in Ramisyllis where branching regions emerge from the region between segments. A member of the "Ribbon-Clade" (flattened Syllidae including also genera Trypanobia and Trypanosyllis), the anterior region and some branches have a flattened shape in Cladosyllis.
