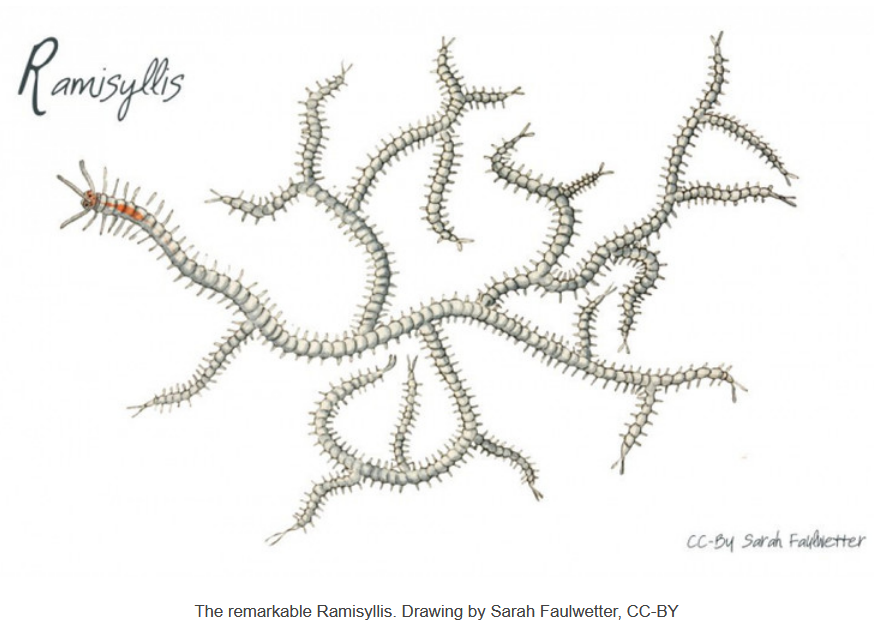

Scientific classification
- Kingdom: Animalia
- Phylum: Annelida
- Clade: Pleistoannelida
- Subclass: Errantia
- Order: Phyllodocida
- Family: Syllidae
- Genus: Ramisyllis
- Species: R. multicaudata

Binomial name
- Ramisyllis multicaudata Glasby, Schroeder & Aguado, 2012

= Ramisyllis multicaudata =

Species of annelid worm

Ramisyllis multicaudata is a species of polychaete worm in the family Syllidae. It was found in Darwin Harbour, Australia, where it was living within the tissues of a sponge of the genus Petrosia. It was the second branching species of polychaete worm to have been discovered, the first having been Syllis ramosa, a deep water species, more than a century earlier. In 2022, a second species in R. multicaudata's genus, Ramisyllis kingghidorahi, was described from specimens taken off the coast of Sado Island, Japan.

== Description ==
This worm inhabits the interior of a sponge and except for the tips of its branches, is not visible to the naked eye. It is cylindrical, about 1mm in diameter and up to 4 cm (1.6 in) in length. The head is buried deep in the sponge and is difficult to locate during a dissection of the sponge. It has three antennae, two pairs of eyes, a pair of palps and two pairs of tentacular cirri. The body is fragile and easily broken in pieces. The dorsal cirri (thread-like growths) on the body segments are elongated and sometimes of unequal length; they are articulated while the ventral cirri are short and conical and not articulated. The chaetae (bristles) are simple and shaped somewhat like tomahawks. Some branches of the worm develop into stolons, reproductive elements that contain the eggs or sperm and which later become detached from the parent worm. Molecular evidence from rDNA indicates that R. multicaudata and S. ramosa have evolved a branching habit independently of each other; in the latter case, the worm initiates branching from a parapodium whereas in the former, an area between the parapodia is involved.

== Distribution ==
Ramisyllis multicaudata was found living symbiotically inside both white and purple sponges of the genus Petrosia in Darwin Harbour, Australia, by Christopher Glasby, who works at the Museum and Art Gallery of the Northern Territory. The depth ranges from low tide level down to about 20 m (66 ft). The worm was discovered in 2006 and first described in 2012, being given the name multicaudata from the Latin multus for "many", and caudata for "tailed".

== Ecology ==
Ramisyllis multicaudata is a branching worm with its head hidden deep inside the sponge. The worm branches repeatedly, forming a tree-like structure. The side branches occupy the channels in the sponge, and their tips sometimes emerge into the open water, making the sponge appear to have white, hairy tentacles.

Researchers are puzzled as to how this worm obtains enough nourishment; the head may be eating the sponge tissues, but the worm is not thought to be able to move around inside the sponge and it is difficult to envisage how it could obtain enough nourishment through its mouth to sustain its much-branched body. The gut is continuous throughout the branches, but has been found to contain very few of the sponge's spicules. One possible solution to this puzzle is that the worm may be surviving on dissolved organic carbon absorbed through its integument, as some other invertebrates, including polychaete worms, do.
