= Parapionosyllis winnunga =

Scientific classification
- Kingdom: Animalia
- Phylum: Annelida
- Clade: Pleistoannelida
- Subclass: Errantia
- Order: Phyllodocida
- Family: Syllidae
- Genus: Parapionosyllis
- Species: P. winnunga

Binomial name
- Parapionosyllis winnunga San Martín, 2005

Species of annelid worm

Parapionosyllis winnunga is a species belonging to the phylum Annelida, a group known as the segmented worms. Parapionosyllis winnunga is characterized by the shape of the blades of its compound chaetae, which have a long subdistal spine, in turn much longer than in other cogenerate species. Its species name is derived from the Aboriginal word winnunga, meaning "small".

== Description ==
The species' body is minute, with a total length of 1.8 millimetres (0.071 in) and width of 0.11 millimetres (0.0043 in), including 27 chaetigers. Its prostomium is ovate, showing 4 eyes in a trapezoidal arrangement and 2 anterior eyespots. Its antennae are short and thin, spindle-shaped, its median antenna being shorter than the length of its prostomium and palps put together. Its palps are fused for their basal half. Its peristomium is shorter than its succeeding segments, while the parapodial glands are small, the animal possessing about 2 glands per parapodium.

Its dorsal cirri are similar in length to the lateral antennae, albeit longer than the parapodial lobes. Its ventral cirri are digitiform. Its anterior parapodia have about 7 compound chaetae each, 2 with long and slender blades 20μm long, with thin marginal spines; and 5 with shorter blades that diminish in length, being 10 μm long above, and 5 μm below. Posterior parapodia, on the other hand, possess 6 compound chaetae with thicker shafts and blades with dorsoventral gradation in length as well.

The dorsal simple chaetae from chaetiger 1 are unidentate and show 4 to 5 short serrations. Its ventral simple chaetae on each parapodium from about chaetiger 18 are sigmoid and smooth. Its acicula is solitary on each parapodium, having an enlarged tip which is also rounded.

The pharynx spans approximately 3-4 segments and is longer than the proventricle. Its pharyngeal tooth is conical and located on its anterior margin. Its proventricle is short and spans through 2-2.5 segments, with 13 muscle cell rows. Its pygidium is small and bilobed, with 2 long anal cirri, which are longer than the animal's median antenna.

== Distribution ==
P. winnunga was found in areas near Halifax Bay, near Townsville at a depth of between 5 and 16 metres (16 and 52 ft) in algae and ascidians. Its distribution is thought to include the whole of New South Wales and Queensland.
