= Erinaceusyllis =

Scientific classification
- Kingdom: Animalia
- Phylum: Annelida
- Clade: Pleistoannelida
- Subclass: Errantia
- Order: Phyllodocida
- Family: Syllidae
- Subfamily: Exogoninae
- Genus: Erinaceusyllis; San Martín, 2005

Species
- Erinaceusyllis belizensis (Russel, 1989); Erinaceusyllis bidentata (Hartmann-Schröder, 1974); Erinaceusyllis centroamericana (Hartmann-Schröder, 1959); Erinaceusyllis cirripapillata San Martín, 2005; Erinaceusyllis cryptica (Ben-Eliahu, 1977); Erinaceusyllis erinaceus (Claparède, 1863); Erinaceusyllis ettiennei San Martín, 2005; Erinaceusyllis hartmannschroederae San Martín, 2005; Erinaceusyllis horrocksensis (Hartmann-Schröder, 1981); Erinaceusyllis kathrynae San Martín, 2005; Erinaceusyllis opisthodentata (Hartmann-Schröder, 1987); Erinaceusyllis serratosetosa (Hartmann-Schröder, 1982)

Genus of annelid worms

Erinaceusyllis is a genus belonging to the phylum Annelida, a group known as the segmented worms. Erinaceusyllis is a marine genus, while some of its species are possibly cosmopolitan. Its type species is Erinaceusyllis erinaceus, formerly Sphaerosyllis erinaceus (Claparède, 1863). As of 2015, at least 12 species have been described, namely E. belizensis, E. bidentata, E centroamericana, E. cirripapillata, E. cryptica, E. erinaceus, E ettiennei, E. hartmannschroederae, E horrocksensis, E. kathrynae, E. opisthodentata, E. serratosetosa. The family contains two other genera, Sphaerosyllis (48 species) and Prosphaerosyllis.
