= Sphaerosyllis goorabantennata =

Scientific classification
- Kingdom: Animalia
- Phylum: Annelida
- Clade: Pleistoannelida
- Subclass: Errantia
- Order: Phyllodocida
- Family: Syllidae
- Genus: Sphaerosyllis
- Species: S. goorabantennata

Binomial name
- Sphaerosyllis goorabantennata San Martín, 2005

Species of annelid worm

Sphaerosyllis goorabantennata is a species belonging to the phylum Annelida, a group known as the segmented worms. Sphaerosyllis goorabantennata is distinct by its small size, small and unevenly distributed papillae, as well as by its particularly long antennae and tentacular cirri. Sphaerosyllis minima and S. minima magnapapillata are also small, but their antennae and tentacular cirri are significantly shorter, like its cogenerate species. The species' name is derived from the Aboriginal word gooraba, meaning "big", alluding to its long antennae.

== Description ==
The species' body is small, with a total length of 2.5 millimetres (0.098 in) and width of 0.11 millimetres (0.0043 in), including 26 chaetigers. It possesses few small papillae, somewhat longer on chaetiger 2. Its prostomium is rectangular and wide, showing 4 small eyes in a trapezoidal arrangement. Its antennae are long, longer than the combined length of its prostomium and palps; they have bulbous bases and slender filiform tips. The palps are blunt, longer than its prostomium, fused along their length, possessing a dorsal furrow and few papillae.

Its peristomium measures the same as its succeeding segments. Its tentacular cirri are long, however shorter than the antennae; the dorsal cirri are similar to its cogenerates', with bulbous bases and thin tips, being shorter than the tentacular cirri, with slender tips. Its anterior parapodia have 5-6 compound chaetae each, with unidentate blades provided with short spines exhibiting dorsoventral gradation. Posterior parapodia, on the other hand, possess 4 compound chaetae each, with unidentate blades provided with short spines as well.

The dorsal simple chaetae from the proventricular segments are unidentate and show marginal spines. Its ventral simple chaetae on the posterior parapodia are sigmoid, smooth and unidentate. Its acicula is bent to a right angle. Sphaerosyllis goorabantennata does not show parapodial glands.

The pharynx spans approximately 3 segments and is relatively slender. Its proventricle spans through 1 or 2 segments, with 15 muscle cell rows. Its pygidium is small, with a few small papillae and 2 anal cirri, which are similar to its dorsal cirri but longer.

== Distribution ==
S. goorabantennata was found in Western Australia, at a depth of between 6 and 24 metres (20 and 79 ft) in dead corals. Its distribution is thought to include the whole of WA.
