= Salvatoria pilkena =

Scientific classification
- Kingdom: Animalia
- Phylum: Annelida
- Clade: Pleistoannelida
- Subclass: Errantia
- Order: Phyllodocida
- Family: Syllidae
- Genus: Salvatoria
- Species: S. pilkena

Binomial name
- Salvatoria pilkena San Martín, 2005

Species of annelid

Salvatoria pilkena is a species belonging to the phylum Annelida. It is known to inhabit the tidal mud- and sandflats of the Hinchinbrook Channel in Queensland.
