= Sphaerosyllis voluntariorum =

Scientific classification
- Kingdom: Animalia
- Phylum: Annelida
- Clade: Pleistoannelida
- Subclass: Errantia
- Order: Phyllodocida
- Family: Syllidae
- Genus: Sphaerosyllis
- Species: S. voluntariorum

Binomial name
- Sphaerosyllis voluntariorum San Martín, 2005

Species of annelid worm

Sphaerosyllis voluntariorum is a species belonging to the phylum Annelida, a group known as the segmented worms. This species is closely related to Sphaerosyllis bifurcata, Sphaerosyllis bifurcatoides and Sphaerosyllis rotundipapillata, all endemic species to Australia, characterized by having large dorsal papillae, sometimes trilobed, and with shafts of compound chaetae distally bifid. S. voluntariorum is more densely papillated on its anterior segments and has a long subdistal spine on the ventral simple chaetae. This species' name alludes to the volunteers of the Marine Invertebrate section of The Australian Museum, who sorted specimens of syllids that led to the description of this animal.

== Description ==
The species' body is small, with a total length of 1.4 millimetres (0.055 in) and width of 0.14 millimetres (0.0055 in), including 26 chaetigers. It possesses numerous papillae on its dorsum and a few on its parapodia, and none on its prostomium and palps; the papillae are long, with trilobed tips and dark inclusions. Its prostomium is ovate, showing 4 large eyes in a trapezoidal arrangement. Its antennae are long, with bulbous bases and long tips, similar to the combined length of its prostomium and palps. The palps are similar in length than its prostomium, fused along their length, ventrally folded.

Its peristomium measures the same as its succeeding segments, covering the posterior half of the prostomium. Its tentacular cirri are shorter than its antennae, the dorsal cirri being the same length as the tentacular cirri, with slender tips. Its parapodial lobes are conical, with 2 subdistal papillae. Its ventral cirri are long and slender, while its parapodial glands are very small.

It shows anterior parapodia with 5 compound chaetae each, with unidentate blades. The blades of the dorsal compound chaetae possess marginal spines about 12μm long, while the blades of ventral compound chaetae are smooth, measuring about 9 μm long. Sphaerosyllis voluntariorum shows dorsal simple chaetae from chaetiger 1, unidentate with few spines. The ventral simple chaetae on posterior parapodia are smooth, sigmoid and distally hooked, provided with a long subdistal spine. Its parapodia count with a single acicula each, bent to a right angle.

The pharynx spans approximately 3 segments. Its pharyngeal tooth is probably located on its anterior rim. Its proventricle spans through 1 or 2 segments, with 12 muscle cell rows. Its pygidium is small, with numerous rounded papillae and 2 anal cirri, which are similar to its dorsal cirri but quite longer.

== Distribution ==
Sphaerosyllis voluntariorum was found in Cape Range National Park, Western Australia, at a depth of 2 metres (6.6 ft) in mixed algae. Its distribution is thought to include the whole of WA.
