= Sphaerosyllis georgeharrisoni =

Scientific classification
- Kingdom: Animalia
- Phylum: Annelida
- Clade: Pleistoannelida
- Subclass: Errantia
- Order: Phyllodocida
- Family: Syllidae
- Genus: Sphaerosyllis
- Species: S. georgeharrisoni

Binomial name
- Sphaerosyllis georgeharrisoni San Martín, 2005

Species of annelid worm

Sphaerosyllis georgeharrisoni is a species belonging to the phylum Annelida, a group known as the segmented worms. Sphaerosyllis georgeharrisoni is distinct by its large parapodial glands with hyaline material; by its small size; short proventricle; a median antenna that is inserted posteriorly to the lateral antennae; as well as long pygidial papillae. Juveniles of S. hirsuta are very similar to this species. Sphaerosyllis pygipapillata has all of its antennae aligned, a smooth dorsum, while its pygidial papillae are longer and slender. The species' name honours George Harrison, musician who died prior to the species' describing article's publication.

== Description ==
The species' body is small, with a total length of 2.3 millimetres (0.091 in) and width of 0.12 millimetres (0.0047 in), including 26 chaetigers. It possesses small papillae that cover its dorsum, extending to its palps and parapodia, being quite numerous on its midbody. Its prostomium is rectangular and is mostly covered by the peristomium, showing 4 eyes in a trapezoidal arrangement. Its antennae are similar in length to the prostomium; they have bulbous bases and moderate tips.

Its tentacular cirri are similar but shorter than the antennae; the dorsal cirri are short, similar in length to its tentacular cirri. Its parapodial glands are large, with hyaline material present. Its anterior parapodia have about 5 compound chaetae each, with unidentate blades provided with long spines which are longer on dorsal chaetae, exhibiting dorsoventral gradation in length. Posterior parapodia, on the other hand, possess 3 compound chaetae with larger shafts and shorter blades which are slightly hooked.

The dorsal simple chaetae from chaetiger 1 are unidentate and show long marginal spines. Its ventral simple chaetae on the posterior parapodia are sigmoid, smooth and unidentate. Its acicula is solitary, with tips bent to a right angle.

The pharynx spans approximately 3 segments and is relatively slender, its pharyngeal tooth located anteriorly. Its proventricle spans through 1 segments, with 13-14 muscle cell rows. Its pygidium is small, with a few long papillae and 2 anal cirri, which are similar in shape to the dorsal cirri but longer.

== Distribution ==
S. georgeharrisoni was found in areas near or at the Houtman Abrolhos up until Carnarvon, Western Australia, at a depth of between 2 and 8 metres (6.6 and 26.2 ft) in dead corals and sand on coral reefs in shallow waters. Its distribution is thought to include the whole of WA.
