= Parapionosyllis elegans =

Scientific classification
- Domain: Eukaryota
- Kingdom: Animalia
- Phylum: Annelida
- Clade: Pleistoannelida
- Subclass: Errantia
- Order: Phyllodocida
- Family: Syllidae
- Genus: Parapionosyllis
- Species: P. elegans

Binomial name
- Parapionosyllis elegans (Pierantoni, 1903)

Synonyms
- Pionosyllis elegans Pierantoni, 1903

Species of annelid worm

Parapionosyllis elegans is a species of polychaete annelid worm. It is found in the Atlantic and the Mediterranean.
