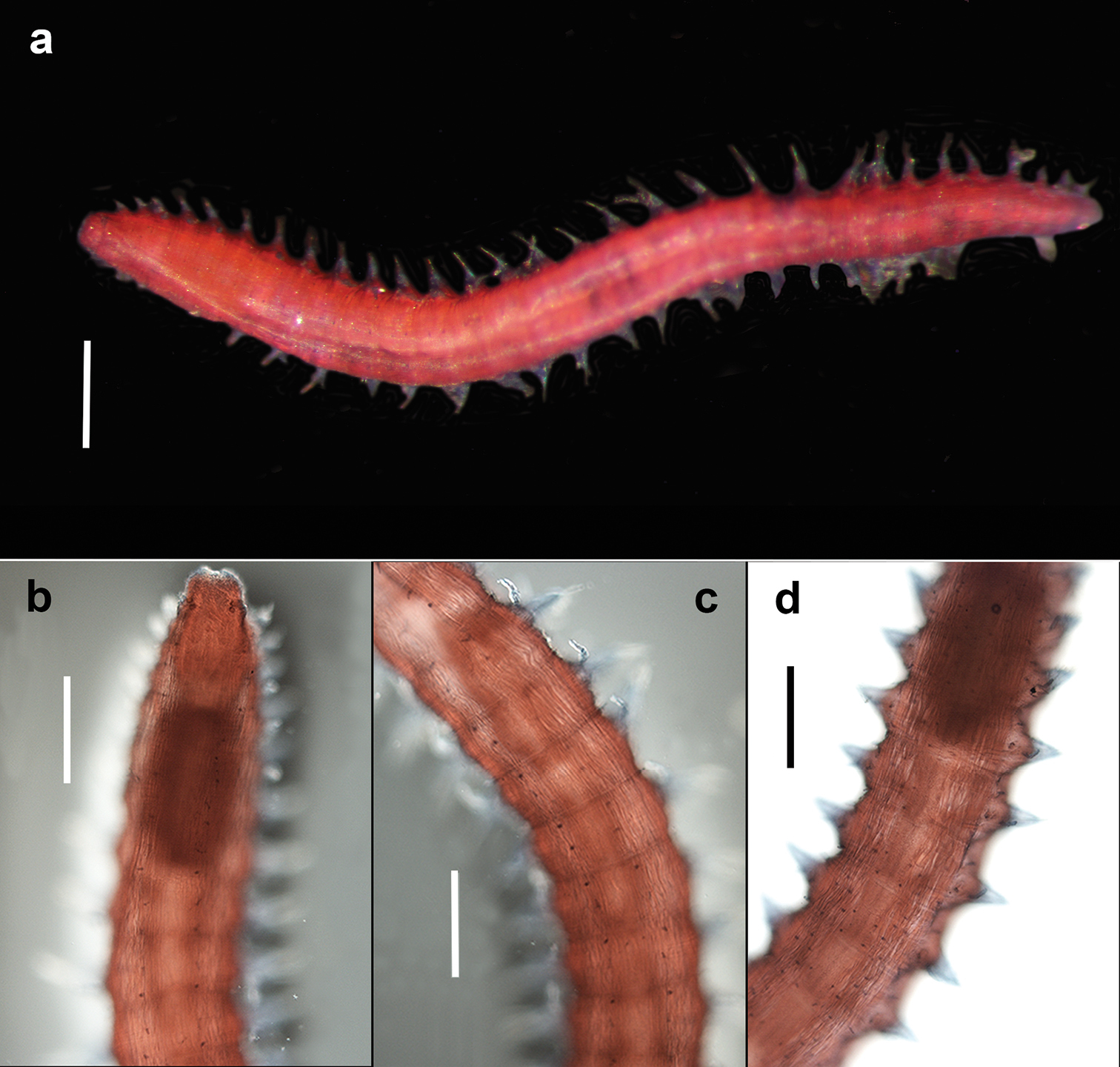

Scientific classification
- Domain: Eukaryota
- Kingdom: Animalia
- Phylum: Annelida
- Clade: Pleistoannelida
- Subclass: Errantia
- Order: Phyllodocida
- Family: Syllidae
- Genus: Prosphaerosyllis
- Species: P. modinouae

Binomial name
- Prosphaerosyllis modinouae Neal & Paterson, 2020

= Prosphaerosyllis modinouae =

Species of marine worm

Prosphaerosyllis modinouae is a small marine worm which belongs to the Annelida phylum. It was originally found in the North Falklands Basin, at a depth of 450 m. The species is named after Ivvet Modinou, a volcanologist and science communicator.

Specimen ranging from 2.8–4.5 millimetres (0.11–0.18 in) in length have been found. The species has protrusions along the sides of its body in between the parapodia. It has three small pear-shaped antennae, as well as two pairs of red eyes.
