= Scytodes kumonga =

Scientific classification
- Kingdom: Animalia
- Phylum: Arthropoda
- Subphylum: Chelicerata
- Class: Arachnida
- Order: Araneae
- Infraorder: Araneomorphae
- Family: Scytodidae
- Genus: Scytodes
- Species: S. kumonga

Binomial name
- Scytodes kumonga Zamani & Marusik, 2020

Species of spider

Scytodes kumonga is a species of spider in the Scytodidae family native to Iran and Oman. It was described in 2020. The specific name kumonga refers to the spider kaiju Kumonga, a recurring monster in the Godzilla franchise by Toho which can spit silk in a similar manner to spitting spiders to ensnare opponents, whose name in turn is derived from the Japanese word for 'spider', kumo (クモ). Kumonga's binomial name in Godzilla Singular Point, Kumonga scytodes, pays homage to this species.

== See also ==
- Agroeca angirasu, a species of sac spider named after the kaiju Anguirus also native to Iran, classified in 2021
- Ramisyllis kingghidorahi, a species of Polychaete native to the Sea of Japan named after the kaiju King Ghidorah, classified in 2022
