= Syllis castroviejoi =

Scientific classification
- Kingdom: Animalia
- Phylum: Annelida
- Clade: Pleistoannelida
- Subclass: Errantia
- Order: Phyllodocida
- Family: Syllidae
- Genus: Syllis
- Species: S. castroviejoi

Binomial name
- Syllis castroviejoi Capa, San Martín & López, 2001

Species of annelid worm

Syllis castroviejoi is a species of polychaete from the family Syllidae. The body of this worm consists of a head, a cylindrical, segmented body and a tail piece. The consists of a prostomium (a section for the mouth opening) and a peristomium (section around the mouth) and has paired appendages (palps, cirri and antennae).

The scientific name of this species was first published in 2001 by Capa, San Martín & López.
