= Sphaerosyllis bardukaciculata =

Scientific classification
- Kingdom: Animalia
- Phylum: Annelida
- Clade: Pleistoannelida
- Subclass: Errantia
- Order: Phyllodocida
- Family: Syllidae
- Genus: Sphaerosyllis
- Species: S. bardukaciculata

Binomial name
- Sphaerosyllis bardukaciculata San Martín, 2005

Species of annelid worm

Sphaerosyllis bardukaciculata is a species belonging to the phylum Annelida, a group known as the segmented worms. Sphaerosyllis bardukaciculata is similar to Sphaerosyllis aciculata from Florida; its chaetae are almost identical; the former, however, differs by having longer antennae and anal cirri, as well as parapodial glands with granular material. The animal's name is derived from the Aboriginal word barduk, meaning "near", alluding to the aforementioned likeness with S. aciculata.

== Description ==
The species' body is small, with a total length of 2.3 millimetres (0.091 in) and width of 0.15 millimetres (0.0059 in), including 24 chaetigers. It possesses short papillae on its dorsum. Its prostomium is ovate, covered dorsally in part by the peristomium, showing 4 large eyes in a trapezoidal arrangement. Its antennae are longer than the prostomium, shorter than the combined length of its prostomium and palps. The palps are fused along their length, eliciting a dorsal furrow.

Its dorsal cirri are short on its anterior segments, while a bit longer on its midbody and posterior segments; cirri are absent on chaetiger 2. Its parapodial glands are small, present from chaetigers 4–5.

It shows anterior parapodia with 3-4 compound chaetae, with short and unidentate blades. The blades of these compound chaetae possess short, marginal spines which are longer on the most dorsal chaetae. Sphaerosyllis bardukaciculata shows four simple chaetae on the posterior parapodia. It counts with a single acicula, bent distally to a right angle.

The pharynx spans approximately three segments. Its pharyngeal tooth is long, located on the anterior margin. Its proventricle spans through two segments, with 23 muscle cell rows. Its pygidium is small, with long papillae and two anal cirri.

== Distribution ==
Sphaerosyllis bardukaciculata was found in Halifax Bay, north of Townsville, Queensland at a depth of 5 metres (16 ft), and Heron Island, in intertidal coarse sand. Its distribution is thought to include the whole of Queensland.
