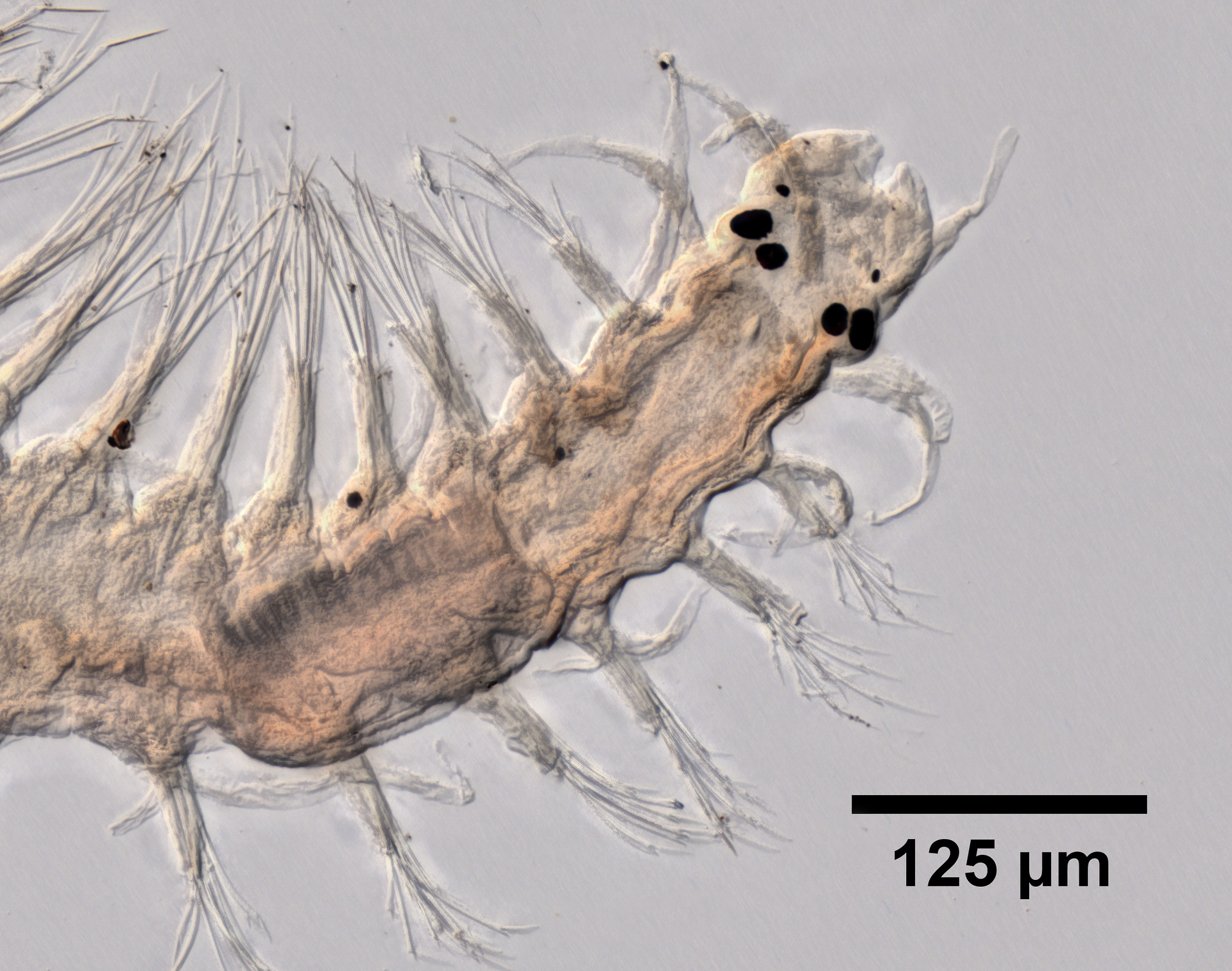
- Salvatoria clavata

Scientific classification
- Kingdom: Animalia
- Phylum: Annelida
- Clade: Pleistoannelida
- Subclass: Errantia
- Order: Phyllodocida
- Family: Syllidae
- Genus: Salvatoria; McIntosh, 1885

= Salvatoria =

Genus of annelid worms

Salvatoria is a genus of polychaetes belonging to the family Syllidae.

The genus has cosmopolitan distribution.

Species:

- Grubea protandrica du Plessis, 1908
- Salvatoria alvaradoi (San Martín, 1984)
- Salvatoria balani (Hartmann-Schröder, 1960)
- Salvatoria californiensis (Kudenov & Harris, 1995)
- Salvatoria celiae (Parapar & San Martín, 1992)
- Salvatoria clavata (Claparède, 1863)
- Salvatoria concinna (Westheide, 1974)
- Salvatoria euritmica (Sardá, 1984)
- Salvatoria heterocirra (Rioja, 1941)
- Salvatoria kerguelensis McIntosh, 1885
- Salvatoria koorineclavata San Martín, 2005
- Salvatoria limbata (Claparède, 1868)
- Salvatoria longisetosa (Hartmann-Schröder, 1979)
- Salvatoria mediodentata (Westheide, 1974)
- Salvatoria neapolitana (Goodrich, 1930)
- Salvatoria nutrix (Monro, 1936)
- Salvatoria opisthodentata (Hartmann-Schröder, 1979)
- Salvatoria pilkena San Martín, 2005
- Salvatoria quadrioculata (Augener, 1913)
- Salvatoria rhopalophora (Ehlers, 1897)
- Salvatoria swedmarki (Gidholm, 1962)
- Salvatoria tenuicirrata (Claparède, 1864)
- Salvatoria vieitezi (San Martín, 1984)
- Salvatoria yraidae (San Martín, 1984)
