= Parapionosyllis =

Scientific classification
- Domain: Eukaryota
- Kingdom: Animalia
- Phylum: Annelida
- Clade: Pleistoannelida
- Subclass: Errantia
- Order: Phyllodocida
- Family: Syllidae
- Subfamily: Exogoninae
- Genus: Parapionosyllis; Fauvel, 1923

Species
- Several, including: Parapionosyllis elegans; Parapionosyllis winnunga

Genus of annelids

Parapionosyllis is a genus of polychaete annelids, first described by Pierre Fauvel in 1923.
