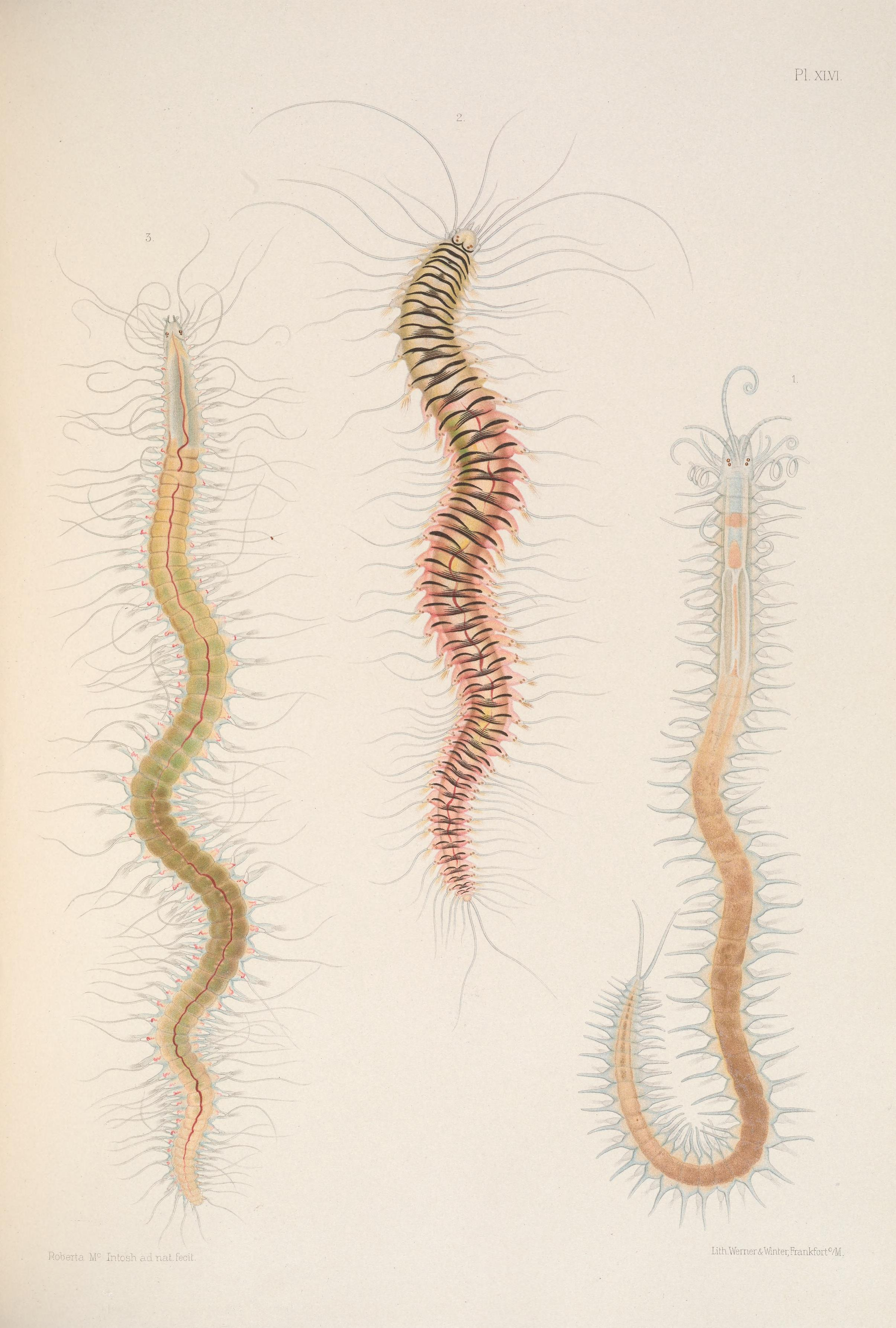
- S. prolifera on right

Scientific classification
- Kingdom: Animalia
- Phylum: Annelida
- Clade: Pleistoannelida
- Subclass: Errantia
- Order: Phyllodocida
- Family: Syllidae
- Genus: Syllis
- Species: S. prolifera

Binomial name
- Syllis prolifera Krohn, 1852

Synonyms
- Gnathosyllis zonata Haswell, 1886; Pionosyllis prolifera (Krohn, 1852); Syllis armandi Claparède, 1864; Syllis bouvieri Gravier, 1900; Syllis fiumensis Ehlers, 1864; Syllis fluminensis Ehlers, 1864; Syllis lussinensis Grube, 1863; Syllis nigrans Bobretzky, 1870; Syllis zonata (Haswell, 1833); Typosyllis bouvieri (Gravier, 1900); Typosyllis nigrans (Bobretzky, 1870); Typosyllis prolifera (Krohn, 1852); Typosyllis zonata (Haswell, 1833)

= Syllis prolifera =

Species of annelid worm

Syllis prolifera is a species of polychaete worm in the family Syllidae. It has a cosmopolitan distribution. It was first described in 1852 by the Russian/German zoologist August David Krohn who gave it the name Syllis prolifera.

== Description ==
This small worm grows to a length of about 25 mm (1 in). The two palps are widely separated and the eversible pharynx bears a large tooth near the rim but behind the pharyngeal opening. On the dorsal surface, long and short cirri alternate. The antennae and cirri have dark spots, but the general body colour is variable, being some shade of brown, grey or pink, sometimes with orange or pink speckling near the anterior end.

== Distribution and habitat ==
S. prolifera is found in the northeastern Atlantic Ocean and the Mediterranean Sea, as well as the northwestern Atlantic, the Caribbean Sea and the Gulf of Mexico, Mozambique and New Zealand. It is present from the lower shore down to the sublittoral zone, on soft sediments of varying types and among seaweeds.

== Life cycle ==
S. prolifera is a "stolonate" worm and has an unusual life cycle. When the worm has reached a length of about forty segments, the posterior portion of the worm develops into a stolon inside which the gonads mature. The stolon is either female (pale orange) or male (whitish) and becomes a storage receptacle for the eggs or sperm. Breeding is regulated by the phases of the moon, and when the breeding period arrives, the stolon becomes detached and joins others to swarm in the water column, in a process known as "epitoky". Here the gametes are released and the stolon dies. Meanwhile, the parent worm remains on the seabed and starts to grow a new stolon which is ready for release some 28 days later.

When fertilised, the eggs sink to the seabed. After about 48 hours they hatch into metatrochophore larvae. After six days, these grow their first segment with parapodia and develop into chaetigerous larvae. Three weeks later they start to grow the pharyngeal apparatus they need as an adult and when this is complete they are juvenile worms. They continue to grow, adding a new segment every two days. They are mature at a length of about forty segments.
