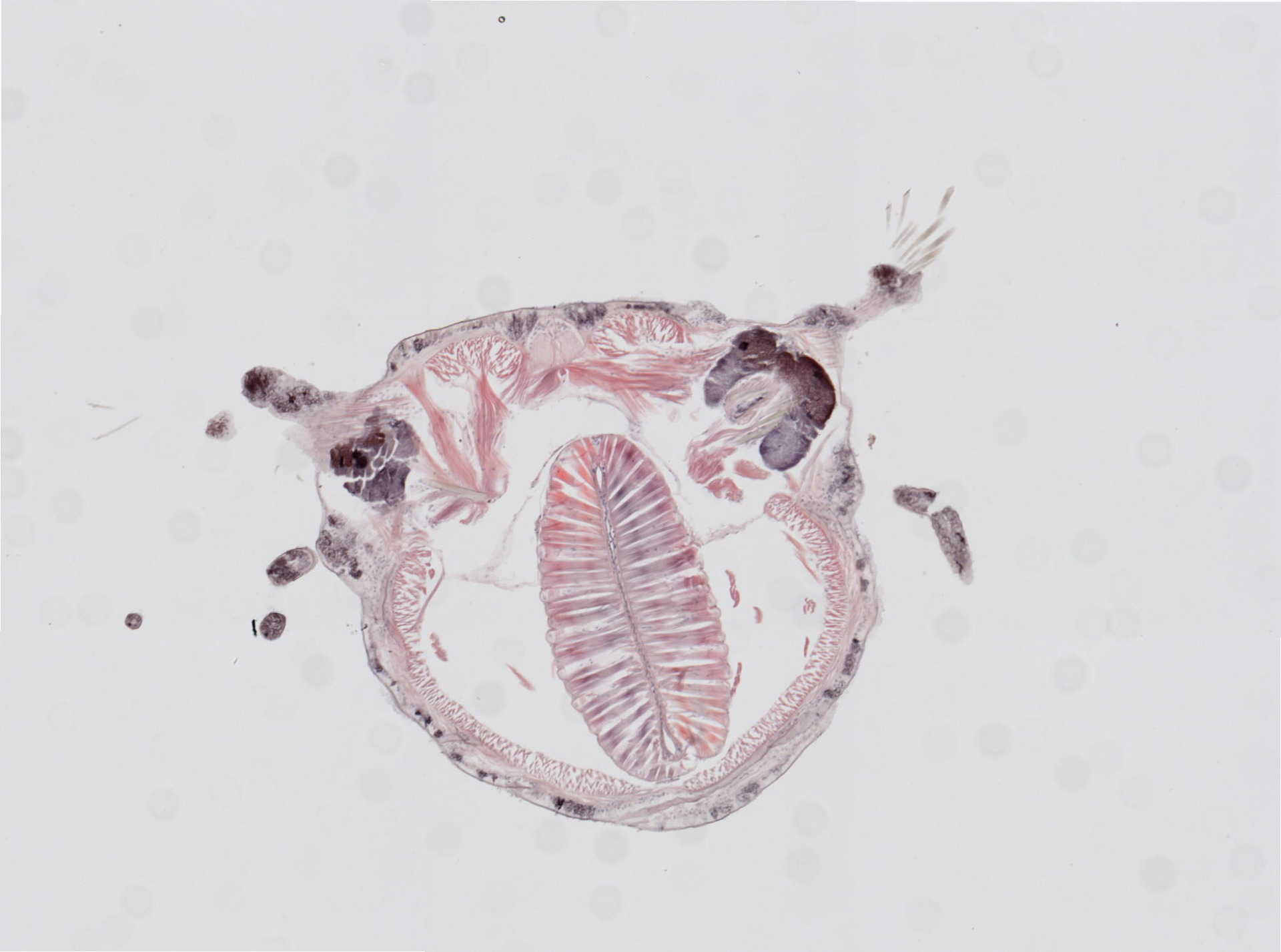
- Odontosyllis enopla

Scientific classification
- Kingdom: Animalia
- Phylum: Annelida
- Clade: Pleistoannelida
- Subclass: Errantia
- Order: Phyllodocida
- Family: Syllidae
- Genus: Odontosyllis; Claparède, 1863

= Odontosyllis =

Genus of annelid worms

Odontosyllis is a genus of annelids belonging to the family Syllidae.

The genus has cosmopolitan distribution.

Species:

- Odontosyllis annulatus (Hartmann-Schröder, 1979)
- Odontosyllis aracaensis Fukuda, Nogueira, Paresque & San Martín, 2013
- Odontosyllis arenicolor Grube, 1878
- Odontosyllis assimilis
- Odontosyllis atypica Chamberlin, 1919
- Odontosyllis australiensis Hartmann-Schröder, 1979
- Odontosyllis brachydonta Verrill, 1900
- Odontosyllis brevichaetosa Paresque, Fukuda, San Martín & Nogueira, 2015
- Odontosyllis brunnea Langerhans, 1879
- Odontosyllis corallicola Hartmann-Schroeder, 1965
- Odontosyllis ctenostoma Claparède, 1868
- Odontosyllis cucullata (McIntosh, 1908)
- Odontosyllis detecta Augener, 1913
- Odontosyllis dugesiana Claparède, 1864
- Odontosyllis enopla Verrill, 1900
- Odontosyllis fasciata (M Sars, 1869)
- Odontosyllis fragilis Kudenov & Harris, 1995
- Odontosyllis freycinetensis Augener, 1913
- Odontosyllis fulgurans (Audouin & Milne Edwards, 1833)
- Odontosyllis gibba Claparède, 1863
- Odontosyllis globulocirrata Hartmann-Schröder, 1981
- Odontosyllis gravelyi Fauvel, 1928
- Odontosyllis gravieri Fauvel, 1951
- Odontosyllis guarauensis Fukuda, Nogueira, Paresque & San Martín, 2013
- Odontosyllis guillermoi Fukuda & Nogueira, 2006
- Odontosyllis gymnocephala Hartmann-Schröder, 1965
- Odontosyllis hartmanae Averincev, 1972
- Odontosyllis heterodonta Góngora-Garza & Léon-González, 1993
- Odontosyllis hyalina Grube, 1878
- Odontosyllis langerhansiaesetosa Hartmann-Schröder, 1979
- Odontosyllis longicornis Hartmann-Schröder, 1960
- Odontosyllis longigulata Perkins, 1981
- Odontosyllis longiseta Day, 1973
- Odontosyllis lucifera (Verrill, 1875)
- Odontosyllis luminosa San Martín, 1990
- Odontosyllis maculata Uschakov, 1939
- Odontosyllis madagascariensis (Gravier, 1905)
- Odontosyllis magnanuchalata Hartmann-Schröder, 1965
- Odontosyllis maorioria Knox, 1960
- Odontosyllis marombibooral San Martín & Hutchings, 2006
- Odontosyllis multidentata Hartmann-Schröder, 1982
- Odontosyllis multidentatus (Hartmann-Schröder, 1959)
- Odontosyllis nans
- Odontosyllis octodentata Treadwell, 1917
- Odontosyllis parva Berkeley, 1923
- Odontosyllis pentalineata Verdes, Pleijel & Aguado, 2011
- Odontosyllis phosphorans (Ehrenberg, 1835)
- Odontosyllis phosphorea Moore, 1909
- Odontosyllis polycera (Schmarda, 1861)
- Odontosyllis polyodonta Saint Joseph, 1887
- Odontosyllis psammochroma Augener, 1924
- Odontosyllis robustus Aguado, Murray & Hutchings, 2015
- Odontosyllis rubens Ding & Westheide, 1997
- Odontosyllis rubrofasciata Grube, 1878
- Odontosyllis septemdentata Salcedo, San Martín & Solís-Weiss, 2016
- Odontosyllis setoensis Imajima, 1966
- Odontosyllis trilineata Imajima, 2003
- Odontosyllis twincayensis Russell, 1989
- Odontosyllis undecimdonta Imajima & Hartman, 1964
