= Odontosyllis phosphorea =

Scientific classification
- Kingdom: Animalia
- Phylum: Annelida
- Clade: Pleistoannelida
- Subclass: Errantia
- Order: Phyllodocida
- Family: Syllidae
- Genus: Odontosyllis
- Species: O. phosphorea

Binomial name
- Odontosyllis phosphorea Moore, 1909

Synonyms
- Hesperalia californiensis Chamberlin, 1919; O. p. nanaimoensis Berkeley, 1923

Species of annelid worm

Odontosyllis phosphorea, commonly known as a fireworm, is a polychaete worm that inhabits the Pacific coast of North and Central America. The organism normally lives in a tube on the seabed, but it becomes bioluminescent when it rises to the surface of the sea during breeding season.

== Description ==
Odontosyllis phosphorea is a small worm some 20 to 30 mm (0.8 to 1.2 in) long and 1 mm (0.04 in) in diameter when fully grown. Its elongated body is composed of many segments, each bearing a pair of parapodia. With these appendages it can crawl, burrow and swim, but it normally lives in a parchment-like tube it creates on a rock or other hard surface on the seabed. The head has two pairs of eyes, a nuchal hood which covers the back of the prostomium, and a ring of small curved teeth inside the pharynx. The parapodia in the central part of the body are slender and tapering. The upper surface of the worm is dark with yellowish transverse bands.

== Distribution and habitat ==
This fireworm occurs on the west coast of North America from British Columbia to California, with a separate population off the coast of Panama in Central America. The species typically lives among seaweed growing on rocks and among seagrasses such as Zostera. It can be found on the seabed from the intertidal zone down to the continental shelf.

== Ecology ==
Odontosyllis phosphorea feeds mainly on bacteria, microalgae and planktonic particles. It swallows this prey whole by everting its pharynx around the food item. It is itself eaten by fish, crabs and birds, being particularly vulnerable during its reproductive phase when it rises to the surface. One means of defence that it exhibits at these times is that it can shed its bioluminescent tail which may serve as a decoy while the worm returns to the seabed.

Reproduction is seasonal in O. phosphorea, its timing related to the phases of the moon. Spawning takes place between June and October, at night at two-weekly intervals coinciding with neap tides. Shortly after sunset, worms begin to rise to the surface. Males usually appear first, the hind part of their body emitting a blue-green light, and periodically discharging a lingering secretion of luminous matter into the water. Females appear soon afterwards, emitting flashes of light, and swimming in small circles on the water's surface. Both the body of the female and the secretions it produces are luminous and sometimes a male gyrates on the surface with a female. The display ceases within half an hour of starting. Water samples taken in the vicinity of males and females and their luminous secretions contain spermatozoa and eggs respectively.

This breeding activity contrasts with the closely related Bermuda fireworm (Odontosyllis enopla) which is largely non-seasonal in its breeding behaviour but very specific in its lunar periodicity and timing, rising to the surface to spawn 55 minutes after sunset, on a night just after the full moon.
