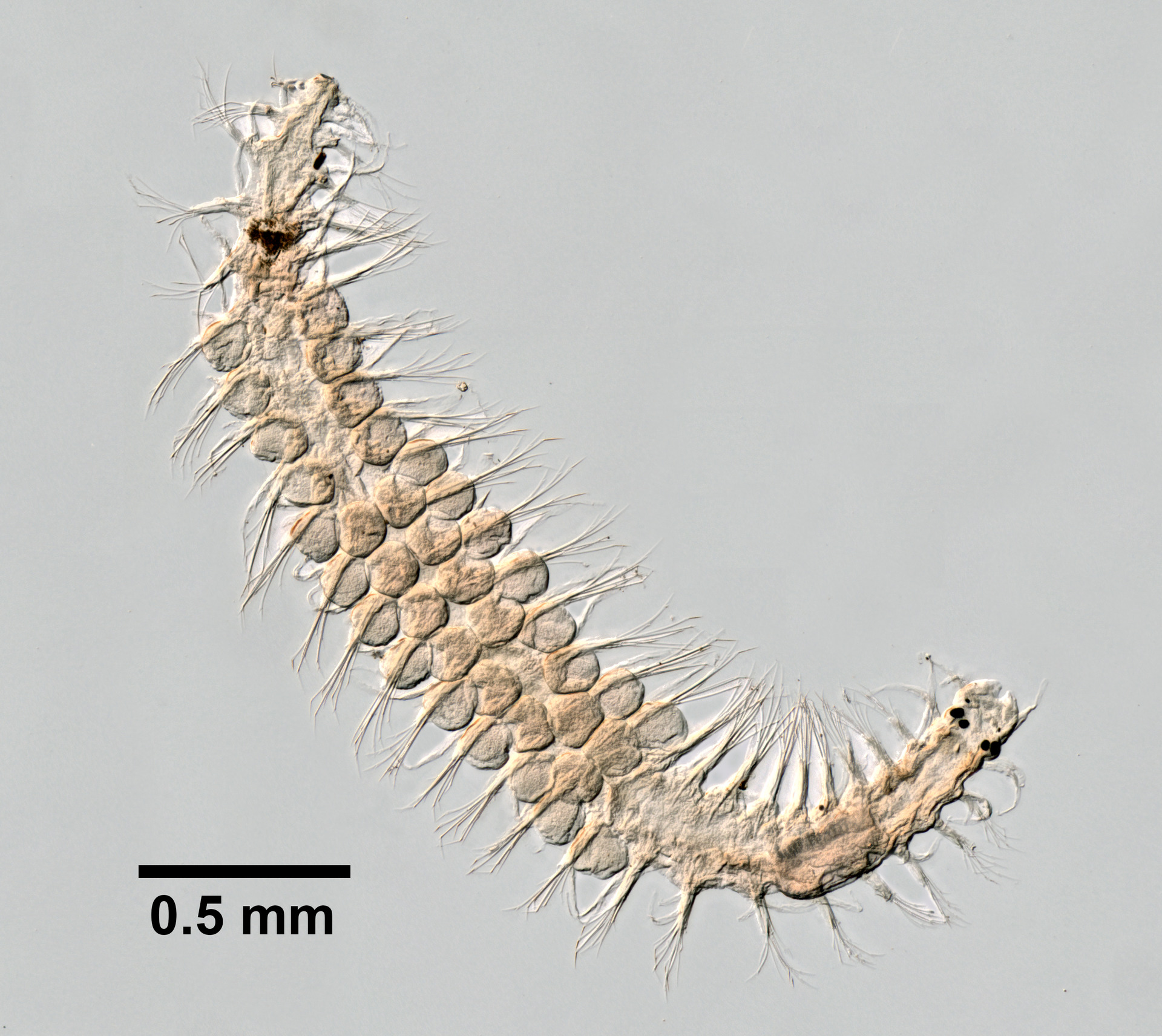

Scientific classification
- Kingdom: Animalia
- Phylum: Annelida
- Clade: Pleistoannelida
- Subclass: Errantia
- Order: Phyllodocida
- Family: Syllidae
- Genus: Salvatoria
- Species: S. clavata

Binomial name
- Salvatoria clavata Claparède, 1863

Synonyms
- Brania clavata (Claparède, 1863); Grubea clavata (Claparède, 1863); Grubea dolichopoda Webster, 1879; Grubea fusifera Quatrefages, 1866; Grubea websteri Verrill, 1882; Grubeosyllis clavata (Claparède, 1863); Pseudobrania clavata (Claparède, 1863); Salvatoria dolichopoda (Marenzeller, 1874); Syllis clavata Claparède, 1863

= Salvatoria clavata =

Species of annelid

Salvatoria clavata is a species of Annelida in the family Syllidae.The species is similar to Brania pusilla but is a bit longer measuring in about 2mm to 3mm, individuals in this species can even grow to 10 mm. They have parental care. It has an acrosome shaped like a beaker.

== Reproduction ==
They reproduce by iteroparous. The species has been classified as androdioecious, they are said to have evolved from gonochoric ancestors. In this species the eggs are fertilized and incubated in the hermaphrodite's pouch.

== Occurrence ==
The species has a circumglobal distribution. It can be found in the Adriatic Sea, Gulf of Mexico, Aegean Sea, the Red sea, and the Atlantic Ocean.
