= Erinaceusyllis cirripapillata =

Scientific classification
- Kingdom: Animalia
- Phylum: Annelida
- Clade: Pleistoannelida
- Subclass: Errantia
- Order: Phyllodocida
- Family: Syllidae
- Genus: Erinaceusyllis
- Species: E. cirripapillata

Binomial name
- Erinaceusyllis cirripapillata San Martín, 2005

Species of annelid worm

Erinaceusyllis cirripapillata is a species belonging to the phylum Annelida. It was first found in the mud at a depth of 3 m (9.8 ft) New South Wales' Richmond River.
