= Erinaceusyllis ettiennei =

Scientific classification
- Kingdom: Animalia
- Phylum: Annelida
- Clade: Pleistoannelida
- Subclass: Errantia
- Order: Phyllodocida
- Family: Syllidae
- Genus: Erinaceusyllis
- Species: E. ettiennei

Binomial name
- Erinaceusyllis ettiennei San Martín, 2005

Species of annelid worm

Erinaceusyllis ettiennei is a species belonging to the phylum Annelida. It was first found in mud at a depth of 5 metres (16 ft) in Halifax Bay, north of Townsville, Queensland.
