= Syllis curticirris =

Scientific classification
- Kingdom: Animalia
- Phylum: Annelida
- Clade: Pleistoannelida
- Subclass: Errantia
- Order: Phyllodocida
- Family: Syllidae
- Genus: Syllis
- Species: S. curticirris

Binomial name
- Syllis curticirris Monro, 1937

Species of annelid

Syllis curticirris is a species of polychaete in the genus in the genus Syllis. It is found in the Western Indian Ocean off the coast of Tanzania.
