= Erinaceusyllis hartmannschroederae =

Scientific classification
- Kingdom: Animalia
- Phylum: Annelida
- Clade: Pleistoannelida
- Subclass: Errantia
- Order: Phyllodocida
- Family: Syllidae
- Genus: Erinaceusyllis
- Species: E. hartmannschroederae

Binomial name
- Erinaceusyllis hartmannschroederae San Martín, 2005

Species of annelid worm

Erinaceusyllis hartmannschroederae is a species belonging to the phylum Annelida. It is found in the intertidal zone to depths of 15 metres (49 ft). The species is named in honour of Gesa Hartmann-Schröder, an expert on syllid species.
