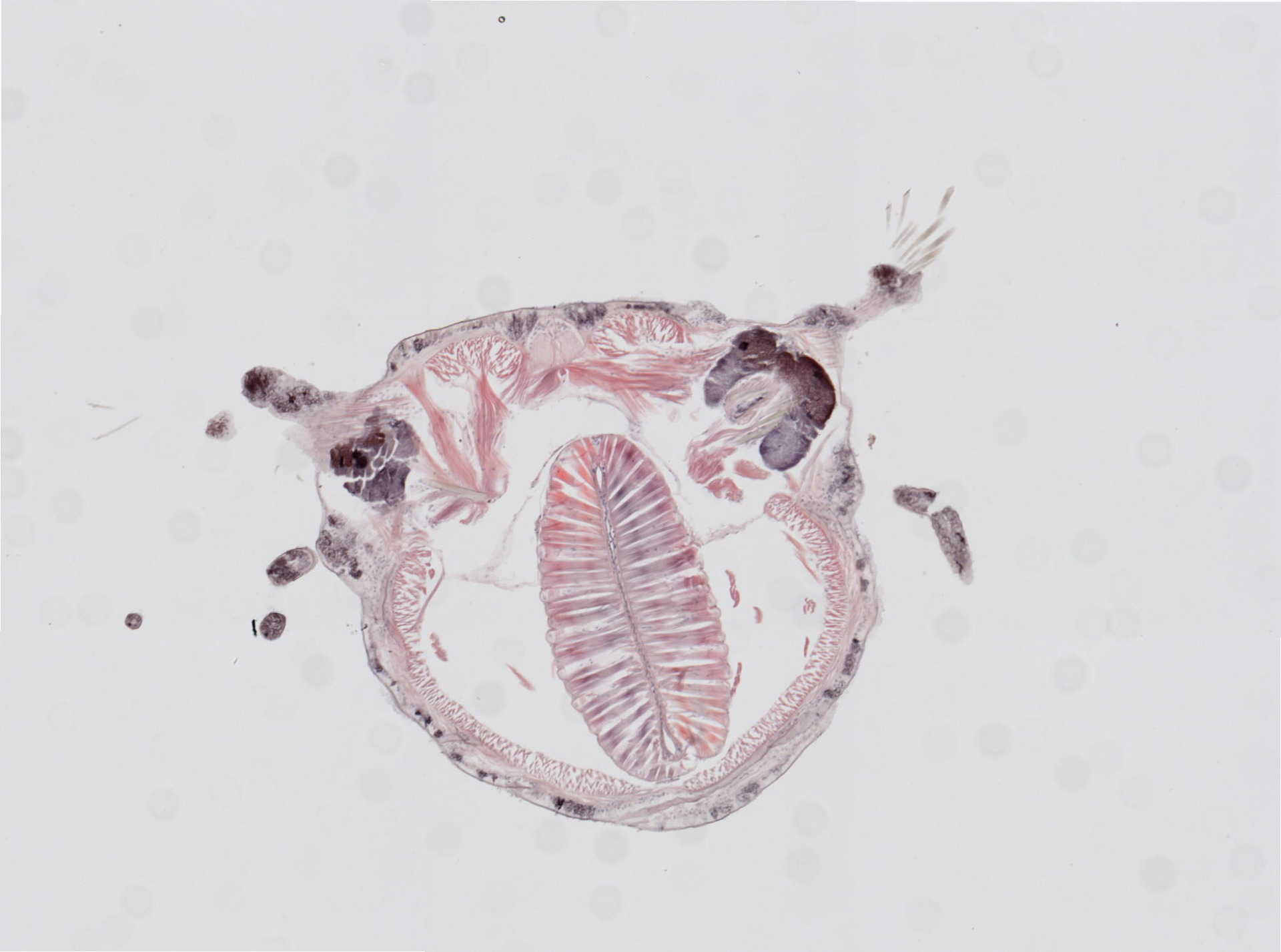

Scientific classification
- Kingdom: Animalia
- Phylum: Annelida
- Clade: Pleistoannelida
- Subclass: Errantia
- Order: Phyllodocida
- Family: Syllidae
- Genus: Odontosyllis
- Species: O. enopla

Binomial name
- Odontosyllis enopla Verrill, 1900

Synonyms
- Autolytus bidens Treadwell, 1941

= Odontosyllis enopla =

Species of annelid worm

Odontosyllis enopla, commonly known as the Bermuda fireworm, is a polychaete worm that inhabits shallow areas of the western Atlantic Ocean. The organism is bioluminescent when it rises to the surface of the sea during its mating period. It is possible that this fireworm is the explanation of a candle-like light seen by Christopher Columbus during his first voyage on 11 October 1492 before he made landfall in his explorations.

== Description ==
As a polychaete worm, Odontosyllis enopla has a body consisting of multiple segments each with a pair of parapodia. The head has two pairs of eyes at the sides with several advanced features including a lens, photoreceptor cells, a retina and pigment granules. Associated with these are linear arrays of tubes which may function in a similar way to fibre optic bundles. Each pair of eyes is oriented in a different plane. Female worms grow to 20 mm (0.8 in) or longer while males typically grow to 12 mm (0.5 in). This worm normally lives in a mucous tube on the shallow seabed.

== Distribution ==
Odontosyllis enopla is native to Bermuda, the Bahamas, the southeastern Atlantic coast of the US (Georgia, Florida and Texas), the West Indies, the Caribbean Sea and the Gulf of Mexico. Odontosyllis phosphorea is a similar species found in the eastern Pacific Ocean.

== Behaviour ==
This small worm is normally inconspicuous, dwelling inside its tube concealed among corals and algae on the seabed, however in the breeding season it changes its behaviour. Reproduction takes place in the summer, two to five days after the full moon; in the early night, female worms leave their tubes and rise to the surface. The timing of their ascent is very precise, taking place exactly 55 minutes after sunset. On the surface, they swim in tight circles, secreting mucus along the length of their bodies which emits flashes of bluish-green light. The female worms are soon joined by males, also emitting flashes of light, and they gyrate together, releasing gametes into the water. After ten to fifteen minutes the spawning period is over and light emission ceases, the worms swim to the bottom, discard their swimming setae (bristles) and build themselves new tubes. The bioluminescence indicates to the male the spot at which a female is releasing its eggs, and the complex eye mechanism enables the male to accurately locate the position. Tests of water samples taken from the surrounding area show that 45 to 80% of the eggs are successfully fertilised by this reproductive strategy.
