= Erinaceusyllis kathrynae =

Scientific classification
- Kingdom: Animalia
- Phylum: Annelida
- Clade: Pleistoannelida
- Subclass: Errantia
- Order: Phyllodocida
- Family: Syllidae
- Genus: Erinaceusyllis
- Species: E. kathrynae

Binomial name
- Erinaceusyllis kathrynae San Martín, 2005

Species of annelid worm

Erinaceusyllis kathrynae is a species belonging to the phylum Annelida. It has been found at depths of 3–18 m (9.8–59 ft) in coral rubble, sponges, and coralline algae on both the west and east coasts of Australia. It is named for Kathryn Attwood of the Australian Museum.
