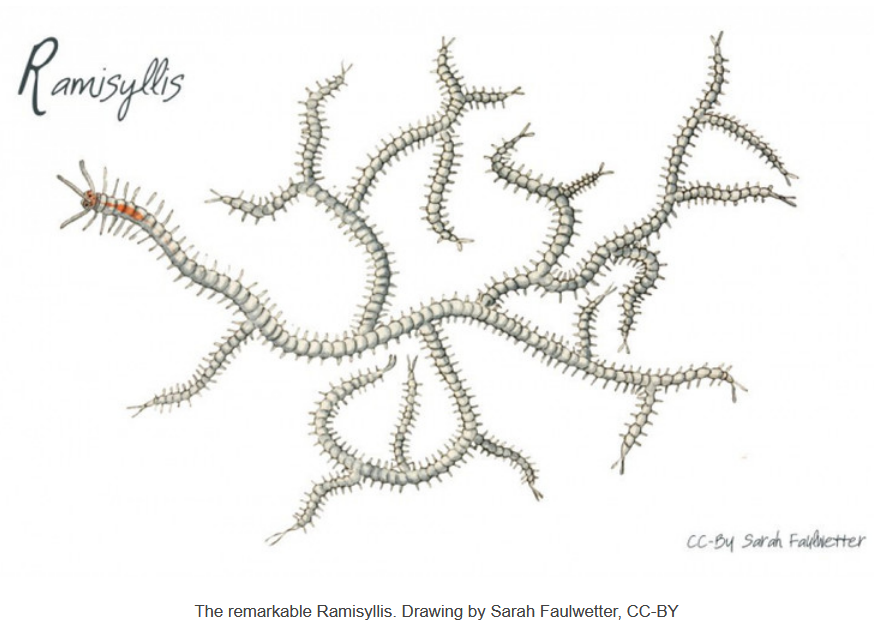
- Ramisyllis multicaudata, illustrated by Sarah Faulwetter.

Scientific classification
- Kingdom: Animalia
- Phylum: Annelida
- Clade: Pleistoannelida
- Subclass: Errantia
- Order: Phyllodocida
- Family: Syllidae
- Genus: Ramisyllis; Glasby, Schroeder & Aguado, 2012

Type species
- Ramisyllis multicaudata Glasby, Schroeder & Aguado, 2012

Species
- Ramisyllis multicaudata; Ramisyllis kingghidorahi

= Ramisyllis =

Genus of annelid worms

Ramisyllis is a genus of polychaete marine worms. Both species are characterised by their branching body plans. Both species are found in shallow water, with R. multicaudata native to Darwin Harbour, Australia, and R. kingghidorahi native to the Sea of Japan near Sado Island, Japan.

== Species ==
- Ramisyllis multicaudata
- Ramisyllis kingghidorahi
