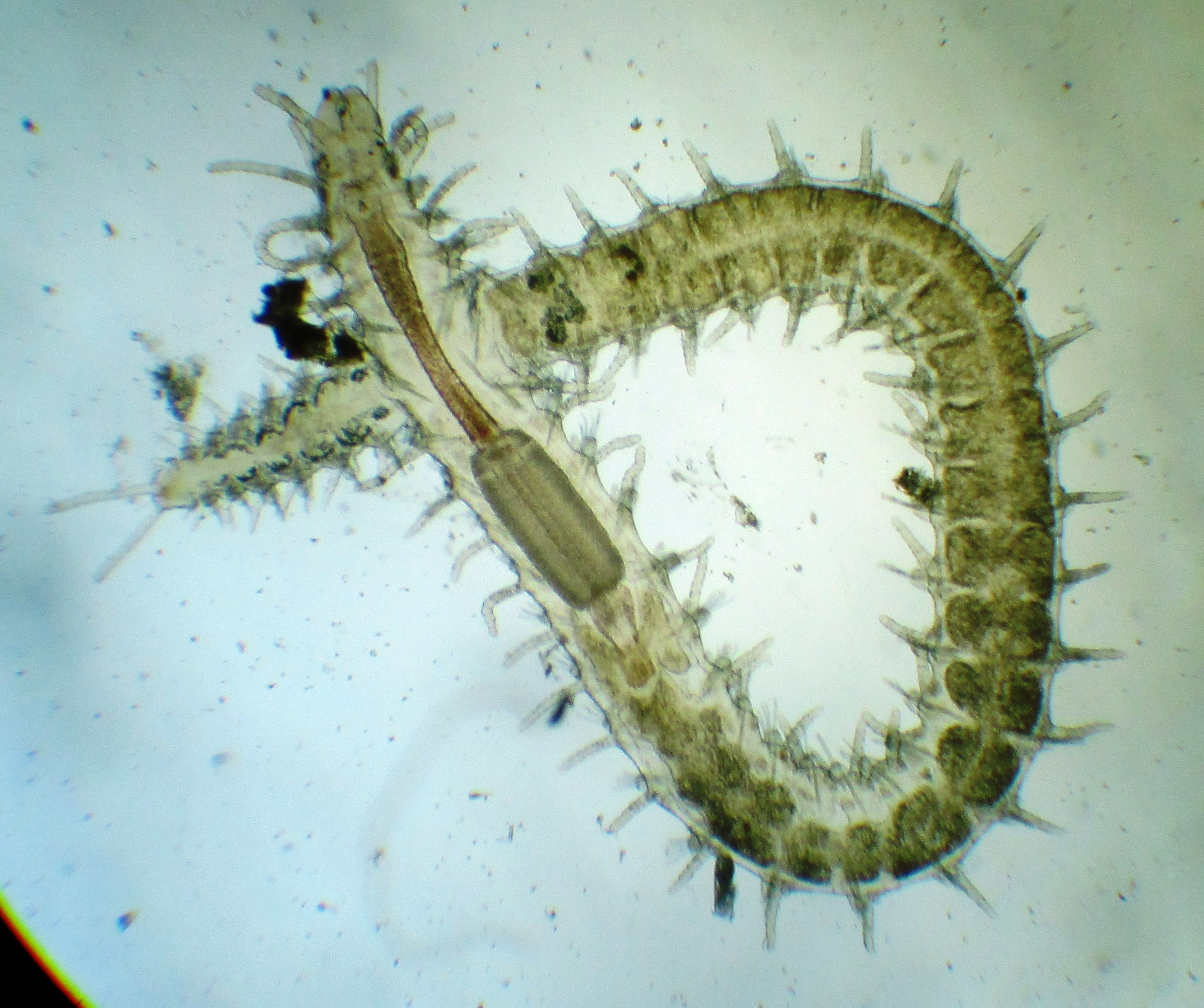
- Syllis gracilis found at the port of Livorno at 0.5 m deep

Scientific classification
- Domain: Eukaryota
- Kingdom: Animalia
- Phylum: Annelida
- Clade: Pleistoannelida
- Subclass: Errantia
- Order: Phyllodocida
- Family: Syllidae
- Genus: Syllis; Lamarck, 1818

Type species
- Syllis monilaris Savigny in Lamarck, 1818

Species
- Syllis aciculigrossa (San Martín, 1990); Syllis adamantea (Treadwell, 1914); Syllis albae Álvarez-Campos & Verdes, 2017; Syllis albanyensis (Hartmann-Schröder, 1984); Syllis alosae San Martín, 1992; Syllis alternata Moore, 1908; Syllis amica Quatrefages, 1866; Syllis amicarmillaris Simon, San Martín & Robinson, 2014; Syllis anoculata (Hartmann-Schröder, 1962); Syllis antoniae Salcedo Oropeza, San Martín & Solís-Weiss, 2012; Syllis armillaris (O.F. Müller, 1776); Syllis augeneri Haswell, 1920; Syllis barbata San Martín, 1992; Syllis bella Chamberlin, 1919; Syllis beneliahuae (Campoy & Alquézar, 1982); Syllis benguellana Day, 1963; Syllis boggemanni San Martín, Álvarez-Campos & Hutchings, 2017; Syllis botosaneanui (Hartmann-Schröder, 1973); Syllis brasiliensis McIntosh, 1885; Syllis breviarticulata Grube, 1857; Syllis brevicirrata McIntosh, 1908; Syllis brevicirris Hansen, 1882; Syllis broomensis (Hartmann-Schröder, 1979); Syllis caeca Monro, 1933; Syllis castroviejoi Capa, San Martín & López, 2001; Syllis cerina Grube, 1878; Syllis cirrita Lee & Rho, 1994; Syllis columbretensis (Campoy, 1982); Syllis compacta Gravier, 1900; Syllis corallicola Verrill, 1900; Syllis cornuta Rathke, 1843; Syllis crassicirrata (Treadwell, 1925); Syllis cruzi Núñez & San Martín, 1991; Syllis curticirris Monro, 1937; Syllis danieli San Martín, 1992; Syllis deleoni Salcedo Oropeza, San Martín & Solís-Weiss, 2012; Syllis edensis (Hartmann-Schröder, 1989); Syllis elongata (Johnson, 1901); Syllis ergeni Çinar, 2005; Syllis erikae (Hartmann-Schröder, 1981); Syllis fasciata Malmgren, 1867; Syllis ferrani Alós & San Martín, 1987; Syllis filidentata (Hartmann-Schröder, 1962); Syllis garciai (Campoy, 1982); Syllis gerlachi (Hartmann-Schröder, 1960); Syllis gerundensis (Alós & Campoy, 1981); Syllis glandulata Nogueira & San Martín, 2002; Syllis glarearia (Westheide, 1974); Syllis golfonovensis (Hartmann-Schröder, 1962); Syllis gracilis Grube, 1840; Syllis guidae Nogueira & Yunda-Guarin, 2008; Syllis heterochaeta Moore, 1909; Syllis hyalina Grube, 1863; Syllis hyllebergi (Licher, 1999); Syllis joaoi San Martín, Álvarez-Campos & Hutchings, 2017; Syllis jorgei San Martín & López, 2000; Syllis kabilica Ben-Eliahu, 1977; Syllis karlae San Martín, Álvarez-Campos & Hutchings, 2017; Syllis kas Lucas, Sikorski & San Martín, 2018; Syllis komodoensis Aguado, San Martín & ten Hove, 2008; Syllis krohnii Ehlers, 1864; Syllis lagunae Tovar-Hernández, Hernández-Alcántara & Solís-Weiss, 2008; Syllis latifrons Grube, 1857; Syllis licheri Ravara, San Martín & Moreira, 2004; Syllis limbata Grube, 1880; Syllis longesegmentata Grube, 1857; Syllis lunaris (Imajima, 1966); Syllis lutea (Hartmann-Schröder, 1960); Syllis luteoides (Hartmann-Schröder, 1962); Syllis macroceras Grube, 1857; Syllis macrodentata (Hartmann-Schröder, 1982); Syllis magdalena Wesenberg-Lund, 1962; Syllis magnapalpa (Hartmann-Schröder, 1965); Syllis marceloi San Martín, Álvarez-Campos & Hutchings, 2017; Syllis marugani Aguado, San Martín & Nishi, 2006; Syllis maryae San Martín, 1992; Syllis mauretanica (Licher, 1999); Syllis mayeri Musco & Giangrande, 2005; Syllis mercedesae Lucas, San Martín & Parapar, 2012; Syllis mexicana (Rioja, 1960); Syllis microoculata (Hartmann-Schröder, 1965); Syllis monilaris Savigny in Lamarck, 1818; Syllis mytilorum Studer, 1889; Syllis nigra Augener, 1925; Syllis nigrescens Grube, 1878; Syllis nigricirris Grube, 1863; Syllis nigriscens Grube, 1878; Syllis nigropunctata Haswell, 1886; Syllis notocera Ehlers, 1905; Syllis nuchalis (Hartmann-Schröder, 1960); Syllis obscura Grube, 1857; Syllis onkylochaeta Hartmann-Schröder, 1991; Syllis ortizi San Martín, 1992; Syllis parapari San Martín & López, 2000; Syllis parturiens Haswell, 1920; Syllis pectinans Haswell, 1920; Syllis picta (Kinberg, 1866); Syllis pigmentata (Chamberlin, 1919); Syllis pilosa Aguado, San Martín & Nishi, 2008; Syllis pontxioi San Martín & López, 2000; Syllis profunda Cognetti, 1955; Syllis prolifera Krohn, 1852; Syllis prolixa Ehlers, 1901; Syllis pseudoarmillaris Nogueira & San Martín, 2002; Syllis pulvinata (Langerhans, 1881); Syllis quadrifasciata Fischli, 1900; Syllis quaternaria Moore, 1906; Syllis ramosa McIntosh, 1879; Syllis riojai (San Martín, 1990); Syllis robertianae McIntosh, 1885; Syllis rosea (Langerhans, 1879); Syllis rubicunda Aguado, San Martín & Nishi, 2008; Syllis rudolphi Delle Chiaje, 1841; Syllis schulzi (Hartmann-Schröder, 1960); Syllis sclerolaema Ehlers, 1901; Syllis setoensis (Imajima, 1966); Syllis sol San Martín, 2004; Syllis stenura Blanchard in Gay, 1849; Syllis tamarae Álvarez-Campos & Verdes, 2017; Syllis tiedemanni Delle Chiaje, 1841; Syllis torquata Marion & Bobretzky, 1875; Syllis tripantu Álvarez-Campos & Verdes, 2017; Syllis truncata Haswell, 1920; Syllis tyrrhena (Licher & Kuper, 1998); Syllis umbricolor Grube, 1878; Syllis unzima Simon, San Martín & Robinson, 2014; Syllis valida Grube, 1857; Syllis variegata Grube, 1860; Syllis villenai Aguado, San Martín & ten Hove, 2008; Syllis violacea Grube, 1870; Syllis vittata Grube, 1840; Syllis vivipara Krohn, 1869; Syllis warrnamboolensis (Hartmann-Schröder, 1987); Syllis westheidei San Martín, 1984; Syllis yallingupensis (Hartmann-Schröder, 1982); Syllis ypsiloides Aguado, San Martín & ten Hove, 2008

= Syllis =

Genus of marine polychaete worms

Syllis is a genus of marine bioluminescent polychaete worms.
