= Pionosyllis =

Scientific classification
- Kingdom: Animalia
- Phylum: Annelida
- Clade: Pleistoannelida
- Subclass: Errantia
- Order: Phyllodocida
- Family: Syllidae
- Genus: Pionosyllis; Malmgren, 1867

Genus of annelid worms

Pionosyllis is a genus of polychaetes belonging to the family Syllidae.

The genus has cosmopolitan distribution.

Species:

- Pionosyllis comosa Gravier, 1906
- Pionosyllis compacta Malmgren, 1867
- Pionosyllis gigantea Moore, 1908
- Pionosyllis heterochaetosa San Martín & Hutchings, 2006
- Pionosyllis kerguelensis (McIntosh, 1885)
- Pionosyllis koolalya San Martín & Hutchings, 2006
- Pionosyllis longisetosa (Hartmann-Schröder, 1990)
- Pionosyllis lucida Chamberlin, 1919
- Pionosyllis magnifica Moore, 1906
- Pionosyllis malmgreni McIntosh, 1869
- Pionosyllis manca Treadwell, 1931
- Pionosyllis nidrosiensis (Bidenkap, 1907)
- Pionosyllis petalecirrus Averincev, 1982
- Pionosyllis stylifera Ehlers, 1912
- Pionosyllis suchumica Czerniavsky, 1881
