= Brania pusilla =

Scientific classification
- Domain: Eukaryota
- Kingdom: Animalia
- Phylum: Annelida
- Clade: Pleistoannelida
- Subclass: Errantia
- Order: Phyllodocida
- Family: Syllidae
- Genus: Brania
- Species: B. pusilla

Binomial name
- Brania pusilla (Dujardin, 1851)

Synonyms
- Exogone pusilla Dujardin, 1851; Grubea pusilla (Dujardin, 1851); Grubeosyllis pusilla (Dujardin, 1851); Sphaerosyllis pusilla (Dujardin, 1851)

Species of worm

Brania pusilla is a species of marine annelid in the family Syllidae. The original name for the species was Exogone pusilla.

The species has a cosmopolitan distribution.

The body can be 1 mm to 2.5 mm long with 28 to 35 segments. It is suggested that parthenogenesis is a normal condition in this species. According to the Encyclopedia of Life the species is simultaneous hermaphroditic.
