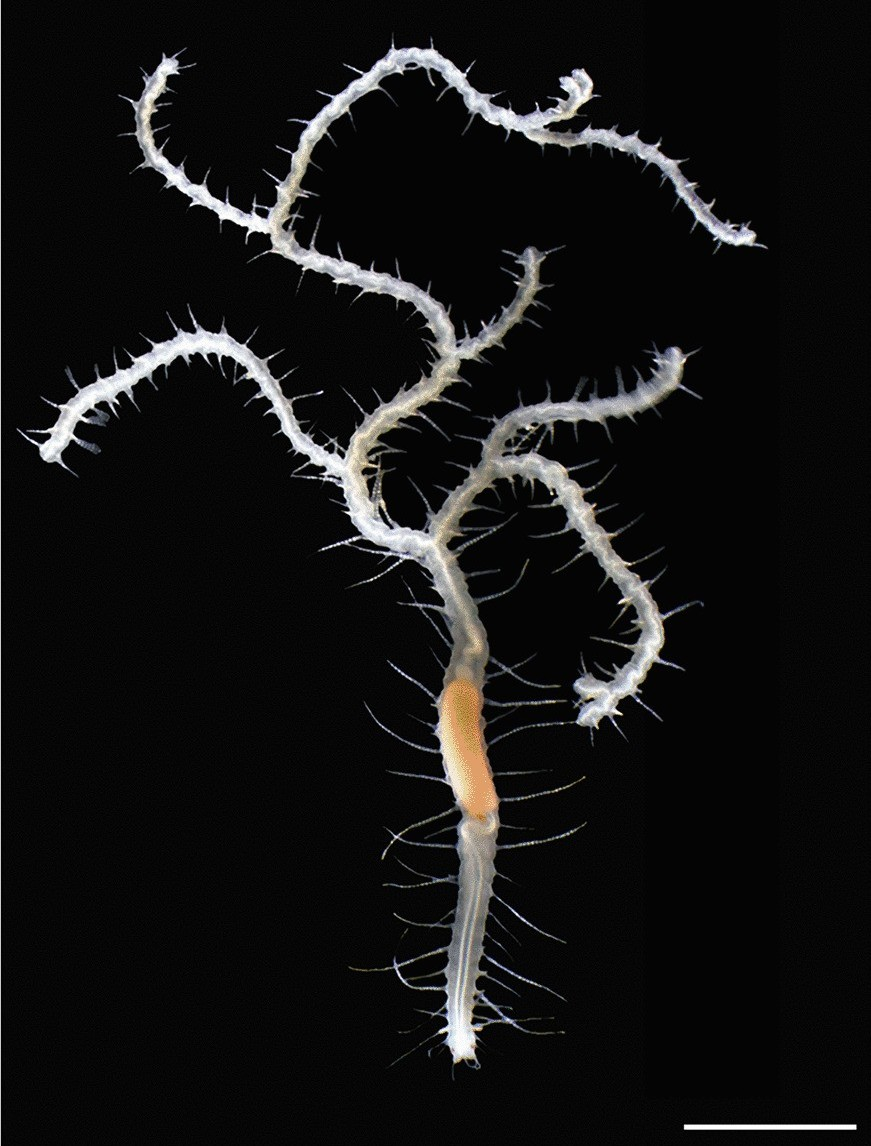

Scientific classification
- Kingdom: Animalia
- Phylum: Annelida
- Clade: Pleistoannelida
- Subclass: Errantia
- Order: Phyllodocida
- Family: Syllidae
- Genus: Ramisyllis
- Species: R. kingghidorahi

Binomial name
- Ramisyllis kingghidorahi M. Teresa Aguado, et al. 2022

= Ramisyllis kingghidorahi =

Species of polychaete worm

Ramisyllis kingghidorahi is a species of polychaete worm in the family Syllidae. The species lives in the Sea of Japan off Sado Island, Japan, where the holotype was found living within the internal canals of a sponge of the genus Petrosia.

== Description ==
R. kingghidorahi is a member of the “Ribbon clade” Syllinae, possessing a segmented cylindrical body that exhibits multiaxial branching that is described as "dendritic" or "tree-like". The first branch occurs after segments 14–24. All branches are of similar diameter.

== Discovery ==
On 1 October 2019, an international team of marine biologists sampled Petrosia sponges in the sea near Shukunegi Point, at the southern tip of Sado Island. Dissection and analysis of the sponges yielded samples of the symbiont worm Ramisyllis kingghidorahi, which were preserved in an ethanol solution for further study. R. kingghidorahi is the third known species of syllid worm to exhibit asymmetrical branching of the body.

== Etymology ==
The species is named after King Ghidorah, the winged, three-headed, two-tailed antagonist of Godzilla. The King Ghidorah character was created by Tomoyuki Tanaka, inspired by Japanese mythology and folklore.

== See also ==
- Scytodes kumonga, a species of spitting spider native to Iran named after the Godzilla monster Kumonga
