= Prosphaerosyllis =

Scientific classification
- Kingdom: Animalia
- Phylum: Annelida
- Clade: Pleistoannelida
- Subclass: Errantia
- Order: Phyllodocida
- Family: Syllidae
- Genus: Prosphaerosyllis; San Martín, 1984

Genus of annelid worms

Prosphaerosyllis is a genus of polychaetes belonging to the family Syllidae.

The genus has cosmopolitan distribution.

Species:

- Prosphaerosyllis adelae (San Martín, 1984)
- Prosphaerosyllis battiri San Martín, 2005
- Prosphaerosyllis bilineata (Kudenov & Harris, 1995)
- Prosphaerosyllis brachycephala Fukuda, Yunda-Guarin & Nogueira, 2009
- Prosphaerosyllis brandhorsti (Hartmann-Schröder, 1965)
- Prosphaerosyllis brevicirra (Hartmann-Schröder, 1960)
- Prosphaerosyllis campoyi (San Martín, Acero, Contonente & Gomez, 1982)
- Prosphaerosyllis chauseyensis Olivier, Grant, San Martín, Archambault & McKindsey, 2012
- Prosphaerosyllis danovaroi Langeneck, Musco & Castelli, 2018
- Prosphaerosyllis fujianensis Ding & Westheide, 2008
- Prosphaerosyllis giandoi (Somaschini & San Martín, 1994)
- Prosphaerosyllis isabellae (Nogueira, San Martín & Amaral, 2001)
- Prosphaerosyllis kerguelensis (McIntosh, 1885)
- Prosphaerosyllis laubieri Olivier, Grant, San Martín, Archambault & McKindsey, 2012
- Prosphaerosyllis longicauda (Webster & Benedict, 1887)
- Prosphaerosyllis longipapillata (Hartmann-Schröder, 1979)
- Prosphaerosyllis magnoculata (Hartmann-Schröder, 1986)
- Prosphaerosyllis marmarae Çinar, Dagli & Acik, 2011
- Prosphaerosyllis modinouae Neal & Paterson, 2020
- Prosphaerosyllis multipapillata (Hartmann-Schröder, 1979)
- Prosphaerosyllis nathani (San Martín & López, 1998)
- Prosphaerosyllis opisthoculata (Hartmann-Schröder, 1979)
- Prosphaerosyllis palpopapillata (Hartmann-Schröder & Rosenfeldt, 1992)
- Prosphaerosyllis papillosissima (Hartmann-Schröder, 1979)
- Prosphaerosyllis semiverrucosa (Ehlers, 1913)
- Prosphaerosyllis sotoi Salcedo, San Martín & Solís-Weiss, 2016
- Prosphaerosyllis sublaevis (Ehlers, 1913)
- Prosphaerosyllis tetralix (Eliason, 1920)
- Prosphaerosyllis xarifae (Hartmann-Schröder, 1960)
