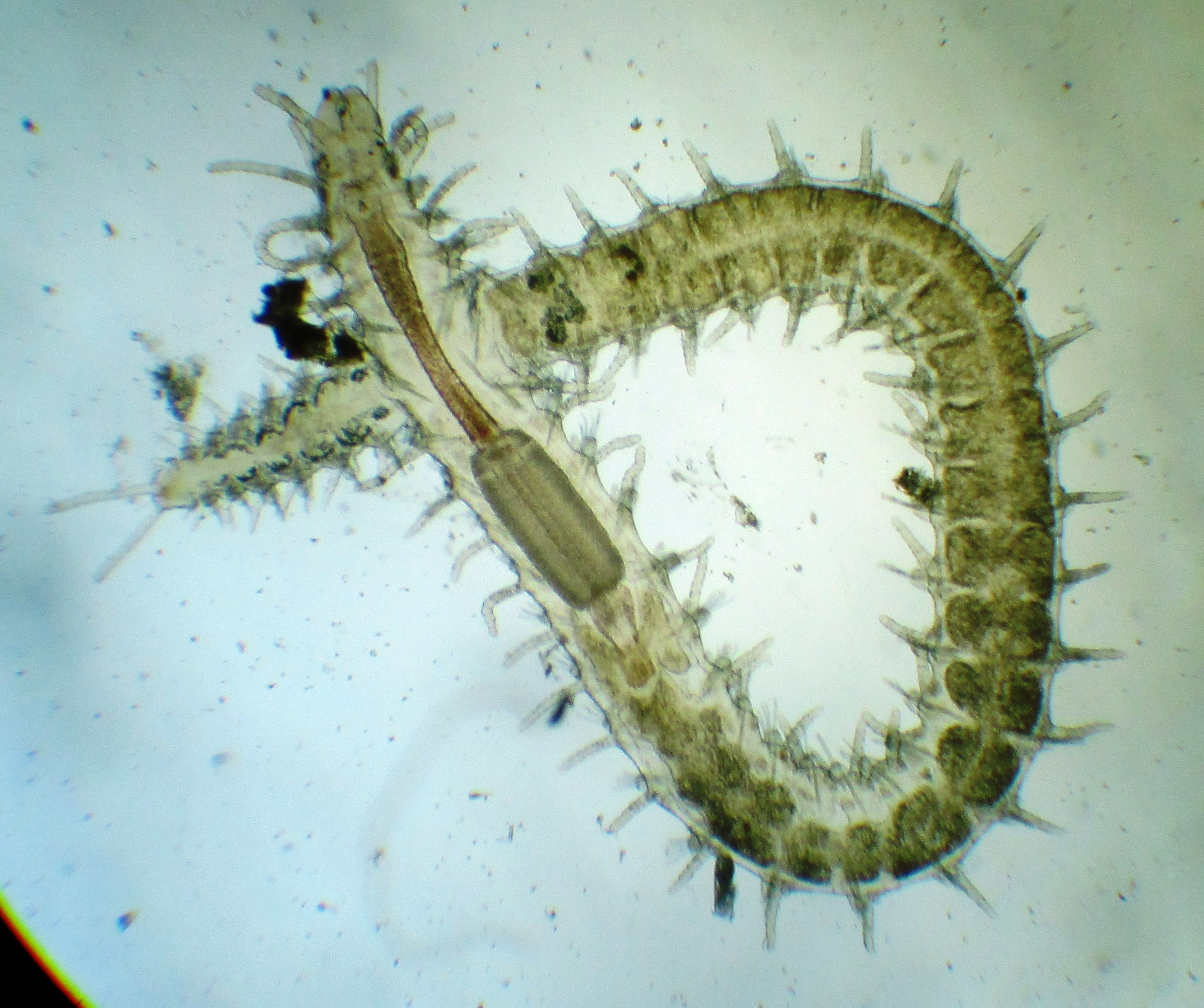
- Syllis gracilis micrograph, showing the distinctive barrel-shaped proventricle

Scientific classification
- Kingdom: Animalia
- Phylum: Annelida
- Clade: Pleistoannelida
- Subclass: Errantia
- Order: Phyllodocida
- Suborder: Nereidiformia
- Family: Syllidae; Grube 1850

Synonyms
- Levidoridae

= Syllidae =

Family of annelids

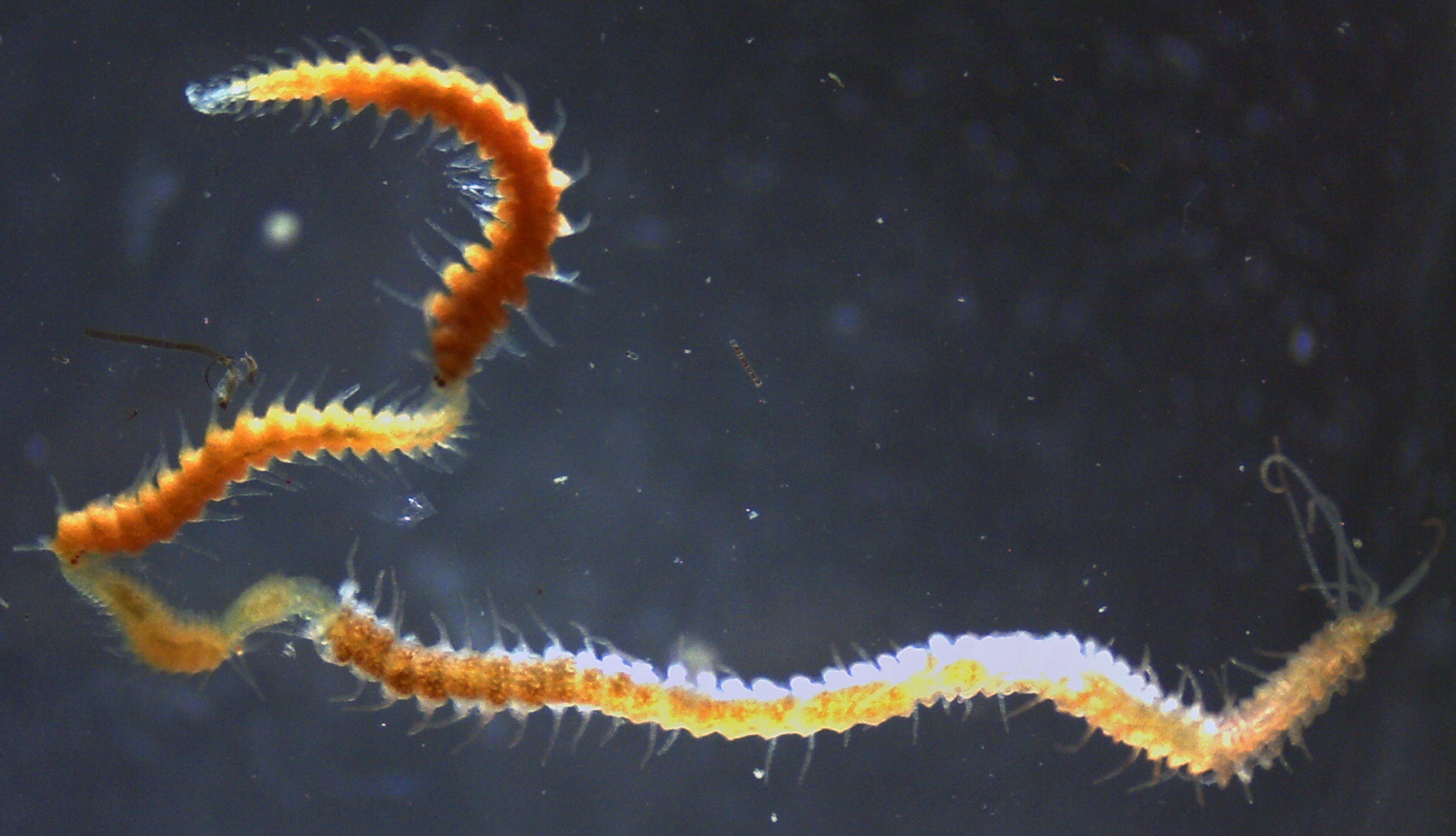
Schizogamy in syllid polychaete

Syllidae, commonly known as branching worms or necklace worms, is a family of small to medium-sized polychaete worms. Syllids are distinguished from other polychaetes by the presence of a muscular region of the anterior digestive tract known as the proventricle.

Syllid worms range in size from 2–3 mm (0.08–0.12 in) to 14 centimetres (5.5 in). Most syllids are benthic organisms that transition to a pelagic epitoke for reproduction. They are found in all regions of the ocean, from the intertidal zone to the deep sea, and are especially abundant in shallow water.

They are found in a range of habitats, moving actively on rock and sandy substrates, hiding in crevices and among seaweeds, and climbing on sponges, corals, hydrozoans, seagrasses and mangroves. They are generalist feeders. A young Syllid was one of the first worms to be found with pollen from seagrass in its stomach, making it a possible pollinator.

The proventricle, Syllid worm's most distinctive anatomical feature, allows the worm to feed by sucking due to its pumping action. It also plays a role in hormone production, and thus the worm's sexual development. The proventricle is composed of strirated muscle cells with the longest known sacromeres among animals. The proventricle is usually visible through the body wall.

Syllis ramosa was the first polychaete discovered to have a branching body plan. Later, two species of Ramisyllis were discovered to have a branching body plan.

== Subfamilies ==
- Anoplosyllinae
  - Streptosyllis
    - Streptosyllis bidentata (Southern, 1914)
    - Streptosyllis websteri (Southern, 1914)
  - Syllides
    - Syllides benedicti (Banse, 1971)
    - Syllides longocirrata (Ørsted, 1845)
- Eusyllinae
  - Clavisyllis
    - Clavisyllis alternata Knox, 1957
    - Clavisyllis tenjini Cejp, Jimi & Aguado, 2023
    - Clavisyllis yongei Watson, 2009
  - Eusyllis
    - Eusyllis assimilis (Marenzeller, 1875)
    - Eusyllis blomstrandi (Malmgren, 1867)
    - Eusyllis lamelligera (Marion & Bobretzky, 1875)
  - Nudisyllis
    - Nudisyllis divaricata (Keferstein, 1862)
    - Nudisyllis pulligera (Krohn, 1852)
  - Odontosyllis
    - Odontosyllis ctenostoma (Claparède, 1868)
    - Odontosyllis enopla (Verrill, 1900)
    - Odontosyllis fulgurans (Audouin & Milne-Edwards, 1833)
    - Odontosyllis gibba (Claparède, 1863)
    - Odontosyllis phosphorea (Moore, 1909)
  - Opisthodonta
    - Opisthodonta longocirrata (Saint-Joseph, 1886)
  - Pionosyllis
    - Pionosyllis compacta (Malmgren, 1867)
    - Pionosyllis serratisetosa (López, San Martín & Jiménez, 1997)
  - Synmerosyllis
    - Synmerosyllis lamelligera (Saint-Joseph, 1886)
- Autolytinae
  - Epigamia
    - Epigamia alexandri (Malmgren, 1867)
  - Myrianida
    - Myrianida brachycephala (Marenzeller, 1874)
    - Myrianida edwarsi (Saint-Joseph, 1886)
    - Myrianida inermis (Saint-Joseph, 1886)
    - Myrianida langerhansi (Gidholm, 1967)
    - Myrianida pinnigera (Montagu, 1808)
    - Myrianida prolifera (O.F. Müller, 1788)
    - Myrianida quinquedecimdentata (Langerhans, 1884)
    - Myrianida rubropunctata (Grube, 1860)
  - Proceraea
    - Proceraea aurantiaca (Claparède, 1868)
    - Proceraea cornuta (Agassiz, 1862)
    - Proceraea picta (Ehlers, 1864)
    - Proceraea prismatica (O.F. Müller, 1776)
    - Procerastea halleziana (Malaquin, 1893)
    - Procerastea nematodes (Langerhans, 1884)
- Exogoninae
  - Brania
    - Brania pusilla (Dujardin, 1851)
  - Erinaceusyllis
    - Erinaceusyllis cirripapillata (San Martín, 2005)
    - Erinaceusyllis erinaceus (Claparède, 1863)
    - Erinaceusyllis ettiennei (San Martín, 2005)
    - Erinaceusyllis hartmannschroederae (San Martín, 2005)
    - Erinaceusyllis kathrynae (San Martín, 2005)
  - Exogone
    - Exogone dispar (Webster, 1879)
    - Exogone naidina (Ørsted, 1845)
    - Exogone verugera (Claparède, 1868)
  - Exogonita Hartman & Fauchald, 1971
  - Parapionosyllis Fauvel, 1923
  - Parexogone
    - Parexogone longicirris (Webster & Benedict, 1887)
    - Parexogone hebes (Webster & Benedict, 1884)
  - Prosphaerosyllis
    - Prosphaerosyllis tetralix (Eliason, 1920)
  - Salvatoria McIntosh, 1885
    - Salvatoria clavata (Claparède, 1863)
    - Salvatoria limbata (Claparède, 1868)
    - Salvatoria swedmarki (Gidholm, 1962)
  - Sphaerosyllis
    - Sphaerosyllis bardukaciculata (San Martín, 2005)
    - Sphaerosyllis bulbosa (Southern, 1914)
    - Sphaerosyllis goorabantennata (San Martín, 2005)
    - Sphaerosyllis georgeharrisoni (San Martín, 2005)
    - Sphaerosyllis hystrix (Claparède, 1863)
    - Sphaerosyllis levantina(Faulwetter et al., 2011)
    - Sphaerosyllis pirifera (Claparède, 1868)
    - Sphaerosyllis taylori (Perkins, 1980)
    - Sphaerosyllis voluntariorum (San Martín, 2005)
- Syllinae
  - Syllis
    - Syllis aciculigrossa (San Martín, 1990)
    - Syllis adamantea (Treadwell, 1914)
    - Syllis albae (Álvarez-Campos & Verdes, 2017)
    - Syllis albanyensis (Hartmann-Schröder, 1984)
    - Syllis alosae (San Martín, 1992)
    - Syllis alternata (Moore, 1908)
    - Syllis amica (Quatrefages, 1866)
    - Syllis amicarmillaris (Simon, San Martín & Robinson, 2014)
    - Syllis anoculata (Hartmann-Schröder, 1962)
    - Syllis antoniae (Salcedo Oropeza, San Martín & Solís-Weiss, 2012)
    - Syllis armillaris (O.F. Müller, 1776)
    - Syllis augeneri (Haswell, 1920)
    - Syllis barbata (San Martín, 1992)
    - Syllis bella (Chamberlin, 1919)
    - Syllis beneliahuae (Campoy & Alquézar, 1982)
    - Syllis benguellana (Day, 1963)
    - Syllis boggemanni (San Martín, Álvarez-Campos & Hutchings, 2017)
    - Syllis botosaneanui (Hartmann-Schröder, 1973)
    - Syllis brasiliensis (McIntosh, 1885)
    - Syllis breviarticulata (Grube, 1857)
    - Syllis brevicirrata (McIntosh, 1908)
    - Syllis brevicirris (Hansen, 1882)
    - Syllis broomensis (Hartmann-Schröder, 1979)
    - Syllis caeca (Monro, 1933)
    - Syllis castroviejoi (Capa, San Martín & López, 2001)
    - Syllis cerina (Grube, 1878)
    - Syllis cirrita (Lee & Rho, 1994)
    - Syllis columbretensis (Campoy, 1982)
    - Syllis compacta (Gravier, 1900)
    - Syllis corallicola (Verrill, 1900)
    - Syllis cornuta (Rathke, 1843)
    - Syllis crassicirrata (Treadwell, 1925)
    - Syllis cruzi (Núñez & San Martín, 1991)
    - Syllis curticirris (Monro, 1937)
    - Syllis danieli (San Martín, 1992)
    - Syllis deleoni (Salcedo Oropeza, San Martín & Solís-Weiss, 2012)
    - Syllis edensis (Hartmann-Schröder, 1989)
    - Syllis elongata (Johnson, 1901)
    - Syllis ergeni (Çinar, 2005)
    - Syllis erikae (Hartmann-Schröder, 1981)
    - Syllis fasciata (Malmgren, 1867)
    - Syllis ferrani (Alós & San Martín, 1987)
    - Syllis filidentata (Hartmann-Schröder, 1962)
    - Syllis garciai (Campoy, 1982)
    - Syllis gerlachi (Hartmann-Schröder, 1960)
    - Syllis gerundensis (Alós & Campoy, 1981)
    - Syllis glandulata (Nogueira & San Martín, 2002)
    - Syllis glarearia (Westheide, 1974)
    - Syllis golfonovensis (Hartmann-Schröder, 1962)
    - Syllis gracilis (Grube, 1840)
    - Syllis guidae (Nogueira & Yunda-Guarin, 2008)
    - Syllis heterochaeta (Moore, 1909)
    - Syllis hyalina (Grube, 1863)
    - Syllis hyllebergi (Licher, 1999)
    - Syllis joaoi (San Martín, Álvarez-Campos & Hutchings, 2017)
    - Syllis jorgei (San Martín & López, 2000)
    - Syllis kabilica (Ben-Eliahu, 1977)
    - Syllis karlae (San Martín, Álvarez-Campos & Hutchings, 2017)
    - Syllis kas (Lucas, Sikorski & San Martín, 2018)
    - Syllis komodoensis (Aguado, San Martín & ten Hove, 2008)
    - Syllis krohnii (Ehlers, 1864)
    - Syllis lagunae (Tovar-Hernández, Hernández-Alcántara & Solís-Weiss, 2008)
    - Syllis latifrons (Grube, 1857)
    - Syllis licheri (Ravara, San Martín & Moreira, 2004)
    - Syllis limbata (Grube, 1880)
    - Syllis longesegmentata (Grube, 1857)
    - Syllis lunaris (Imajima, 1966)
    - Syllis lutea (Hartmann-Schröder, 1960)
    - Syllis luteoides (Hartmann-Schröder, 1962)
    - Syllis macroceras (Grube, 1857)
    - Syllis macrodentata (Hartmann-Schröder, 1982)
    - Syllis magdalena (Wesenberg-Lund, 1962)
    - Syllis magnapalpa (Hartmann-Schröder, 1965)
    - Syllis marceloi (San Martín, Álvarez-Campos & Hutchings, 2017)
    - Syllis marugani (Aguado, San Martín & Nishi, 2006)
    - Syllis maryae (San Martín, 1992)
    - Syllis mauretanica (Licher, 1999)
    - Syllis mayeri (Musco & Giangrande, 2005)
    - Syllis mercedesae (Lucas, San Martín & Parapar, 2012)
    - Syllis mexicana (Rioja, 1960)
    - Syllis microoculata (Hartmann-Schröder, 1965)
    - Syllis monilaris (Savigny in Lamarck, 1818)
    - Syllis mytilorum (Studer, 1889)
    - Syllis nigra (Augener, 1925)
    - Syllis nigrescens (Grube, 1878)
    - Syllis nigricirris (Grube, 1863)
    - Syllis nigriscens (Grube, 1878)
    - Syllis nigropunctata (Haswell, 1886)
    - Syllis notocera (Ehlers, 1905)
    - Syllis nuchalis (Hartmann-Schröder, 1960)
    - Syllis obscura (Grube, 1857)
    - Syllis onkylochaeta (Hartmann-Schröder, 1991)
    - Syllis ortizi (San Martín, 1992)
    - Syllis parapari (San Martín & López, 2000)
    - Syllis parturiens (Haswell, 1920)
    - Syllis pectinans (Haswell, 1920)
    - Syllis picta (Kinberg, 1866)
    - Syllis pigmentata (Chamberlin, 1919)
    - Syllis pilosa (Aguado, San Martín & Nishi, 2008)
    - Syllis pontxioi (San Martín & López, 2000)
    - Syllis profunda (Cognetti, 1955)
    - Syllis prolifera (Krohn, 1852)
    - Syllis prolixa (Ehlers, 1901)
    - Syllis pseudoarmillaris (Nogueira & San Martín, 2002)
    - Syllis pulvinata (Langerhans, 1881)
    - Syllis quadrifasciata (Fischli, 1900)
    - Syllis quaternaria (Moore, 1906)
    - Syllis ramosa (McIntosh, 1879)
    - Syllis riojai (San Martín, 1990)
    - Syllis robertianae (McIntosh, 1885)
    - Syllis rosea (Langerhans, 1879)
    - Syllis rubicunda (Aguado, San Martín & Nishi, 2008)
    - Syllis rudolphi (Delle Chiaje, 1841)
    - Syllis schulzi (Hartmann-Schröder, 1960)
    - Syllis sclerolaema (Ehlers, 1901)
    - Syllis setoensis (Imajima, 1966)
    - Syllis sol (San Martín, 2004)
    - Syllis stenura (Blanchard in Gay, 1849)
    - Syllis tamarae (Álvarez-Campos & Verdes, 2017)
    - Syllis tiedemanni (Delle Chiaje, 1841)
    - Syllis torquata (Marion & Bobretzky, 1875)
    - Syllis tripantu (Álvarez-Campos & Verdes, 2017)
    - Syllis truncata (Haswell, 1920)
    - Syllis tyrrhena (Licher & Kuper, 1998)
    - Syllis umbricolor (Grube, 1878)
    - Syllis unzima (Simon, San Martín & Robinson, 2014)
    - Syllis valida (Grube, 1857)
    - Syllis variegata (Grube, 1860)
    - Syllis villenai (Aguado, San Martín & ten Hove, 2008)
    - Syllis violacea (Grube, 1870)
    - Syllis vittata (Grube, 1840)
    - Syllis vivipara (Krohn, 1869)
    - Syllis warrnamboolensis (Hartmann-Schröder, 1987)
    - Syllis westheidei (San Martín, 1984)
    - Syllis yallingupensis (Hartmann-Schröder, 1982)
    - Syllis ypsiloides (Aguado, San Martín & ten Hove, 2008)
  - Ramisyllis
    - Ramisyllis multicaudata (Glasby, Schroeder & Aguado, 2012)
    - Ramisyllis kingghidorahi (M. Teresa Aguado, et al. 2022)

== In Thailand ==
Syllid worms are commonly referred to in Thai as tua roi khā (Thai: ตัวร้อยขา, lit. 'hundred-legged creatures') or tua Songkran (ตัวสงกรานต์, Songkra creatures), as they are often reported in tap water supplies around the Songkran festival period (13–15 April), which coincides with Thailand's hot season. They are also sometimes called "rainbow creatures" due to their brightly colored, iridescent bodies resembling a rainbow. The Metropolitan Waterworks Authority has explained that their presence may be associated with leaks or defects in sections of water distribution pipelines, allowing small aquatic organisms to enter the system.

Thai zoologist Boonsong Lekagul, a prominent figure in the country's zoological history, recorded an observation of a Songkran creature at a house near the Uruphong Bridge (now Uruphong Intersection) on Phetchaburi Road on 13 April 1945 at 08:00, during high tide conditions. The specimen was described as exhibiting iridescent coloration when submerged in water, measuring approximately 4.2 centimetres (1.7 in) in length, with numerous ventral parapodia resembling centipede-like legs. While swimming, its body appeared to twist in a helical motion, and upon handling, it readily fragmented into multiple segments.

Syllid worms found in Bangkok's water supply systems are generally classified within the family Syllidae, whereas specimens reported in Chachoengsao are often associated with the family Nereidae.
