= Peristomium =

First true body segment of an annelid

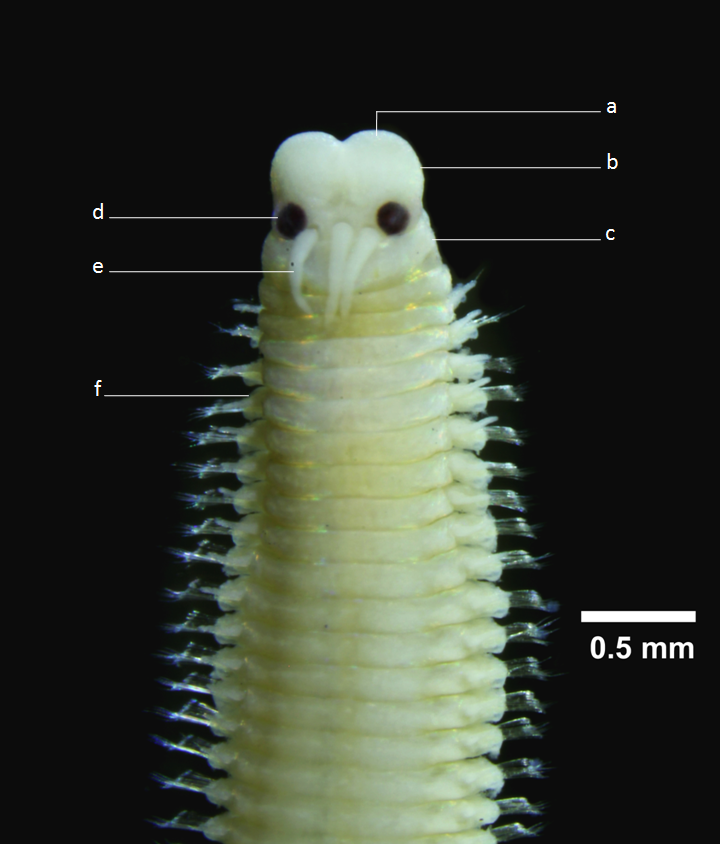
Lysidice oele Horst, 1905. a=palp; b=prostomium; c=peristomium; d=eye; e=occipital antenna; f=parapodium with chaetae

The peristomium is the first true body segment in an annelid worm's body in the anterior end. It is directly behind the prostomium and contains the mouth, tentacular cirri, and sometimes feeding palps, which may instead occur on the prostomium. If an eversible pharynx is present, it is contained in this segment as well, and can fill up to 20 segments when inverted, depending on the species.

The prostomium and peristomium can be variously fused, either completely distinct, or comprising a joint structure of a peristomial ring and a tentacular crown.

== See also ==
- Prostomium
- Pygidium
