= Magelona dakini =

Scientific classification
- Kingdom: Animalia
- Phylum: Annelida
- Clade: Palaeoannelida
- Family: Magelonidae
- Genus: Magelona
- Species: M. dakini

Binomial name
- Magelona dakini (Jones, 1978)

Species of annelid worm

Magelona dakini is a small, thin, shovel-nosed burrowing worm with limited mobility. Adults grow up to 70mm long. Magelonids build meandering burrows, usually below the top 20mm of sediment, in medium to fine sands. They occur across the mid-intertidal and subtidal zones to the continental slope.

M. dakini is important to researchers because it can be used to gauge an ecosystem's health. Under normal conditions, this worm can be dispersed and wide spread in the marine soil. However, when a ecosystem becomes polluted, M. dakini will start to die off and will only be found in non contaminated areas. When the area is cleaned, M. dakini will repopulate. This species is not especially susceptible to metal loading, meaning, excess iron and lead does not affect it much.

In 2020, a paper described a new fossil from the Canglangpu formation of China was described. Dannychaeta tucolus lived about 514 million years ago, putting it in the middle Cambrian. Known from multiple fossils, this species is morphologically very similar to M. dakini, meaning M. dakini features are very basal and has not changed much since the middle Cambrian. Similar to M. dakini, D. tucolus is also characterized by two spindles that are located next to its mouth and lived in shallow borrows on the sea floor as indicated by trace fossils and intact trace fossils with D. tucolus inside of them. D. tucolus is considered a crown-group annelid, meaning it is one of the first unambiguous annelids.
