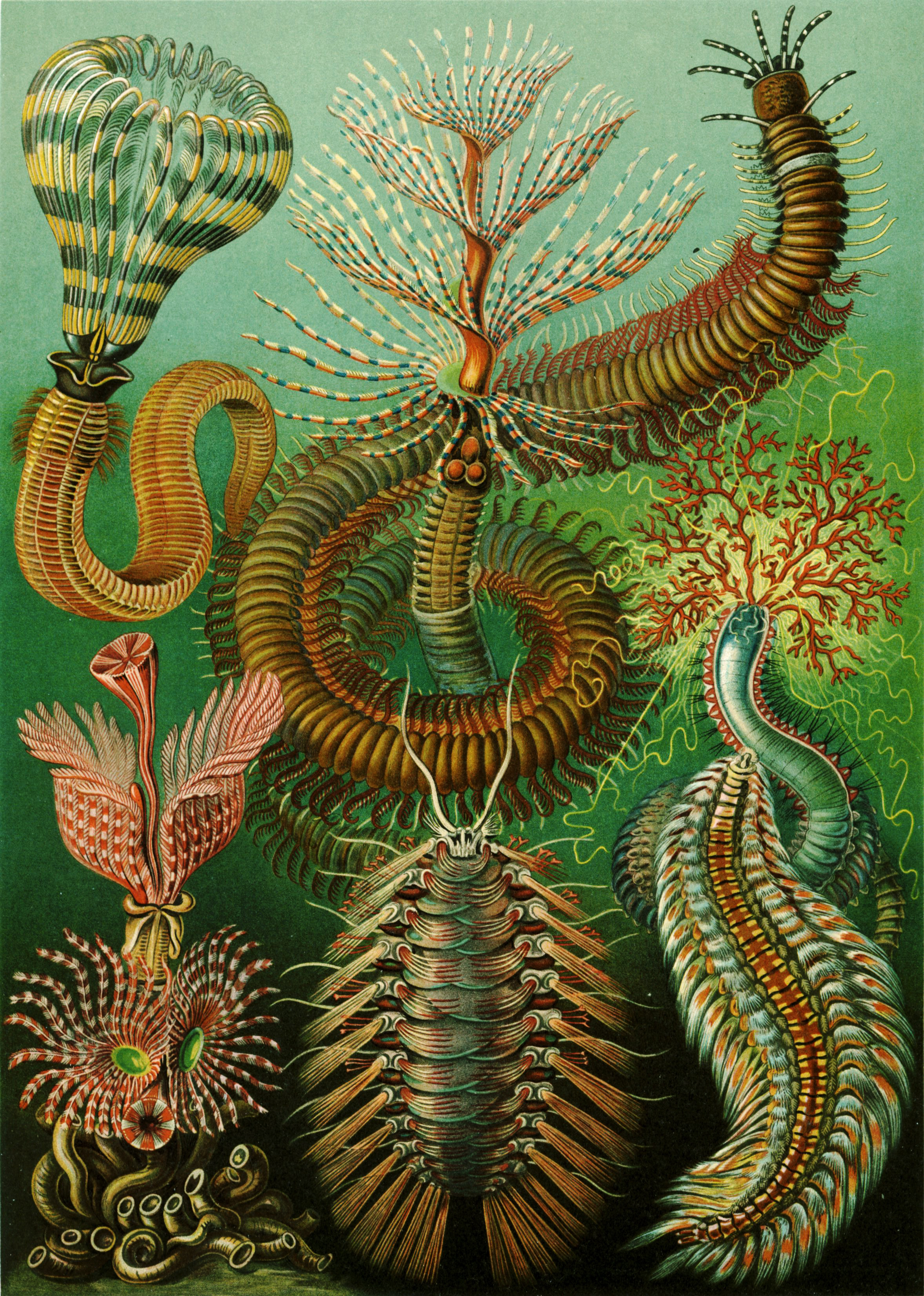
- Illustration by Ernst Haeckel

Scientific classification
- Domain: Eukaryota
- Kingdom: Animalia
- Phylum: Annelida
- Class: Polychaeta
- Subclass: Palpata

Orders
- Aciculata; Canalipalpata

= Palpata =

Subclass of annelid worms

Palpata is a subclass of polychaete worm. Members of this subclass are mostly deposit feeders on marine detritus or filter feeders. Palpata has become superfluous with the elevation of Canalipalpata to subclass.

== Characteristics ==
Palpata includes the majority of genera and species of polychaete worms and is subdivided into the orders Aciculata and Canalipalpata. The prostomium is characterised by a pair of sensory palps which gives the subclass its name and which are lacking in the other main taxon of polychaetes, the Scolecida.

Aciculata is a large group including about half of all existing polychaete species and is equivalent to the old taxonomic group "Errantia", worms that can move about freely by crawling or swimming. These worms are characterised by having internal supporting chaetae in their parapodia. Aciculata is divided into suborders Eunicida and Phyllodocida.

Canalipalpata is equivalent to the old taxonomic group "Sedentaria", worms that stay in one place, living in a self-made tube composed of mud or sand cemented together with mucus. Members of Canalipalpata are worms with elongated grooved palp structures used for feeding and the order is divided into suborders Sabellida, Spionida and Terebellida.

== Taxonomy ==
Further research is likely to result in changes to the cladistics of the annelids, the monophyly of which is in doubt. The World Register of Marine Species considers Palpata a "nomen dubium" and divides the polychaetes into three subclasses, Aciculata, Canalipalpata and Scolecida.
