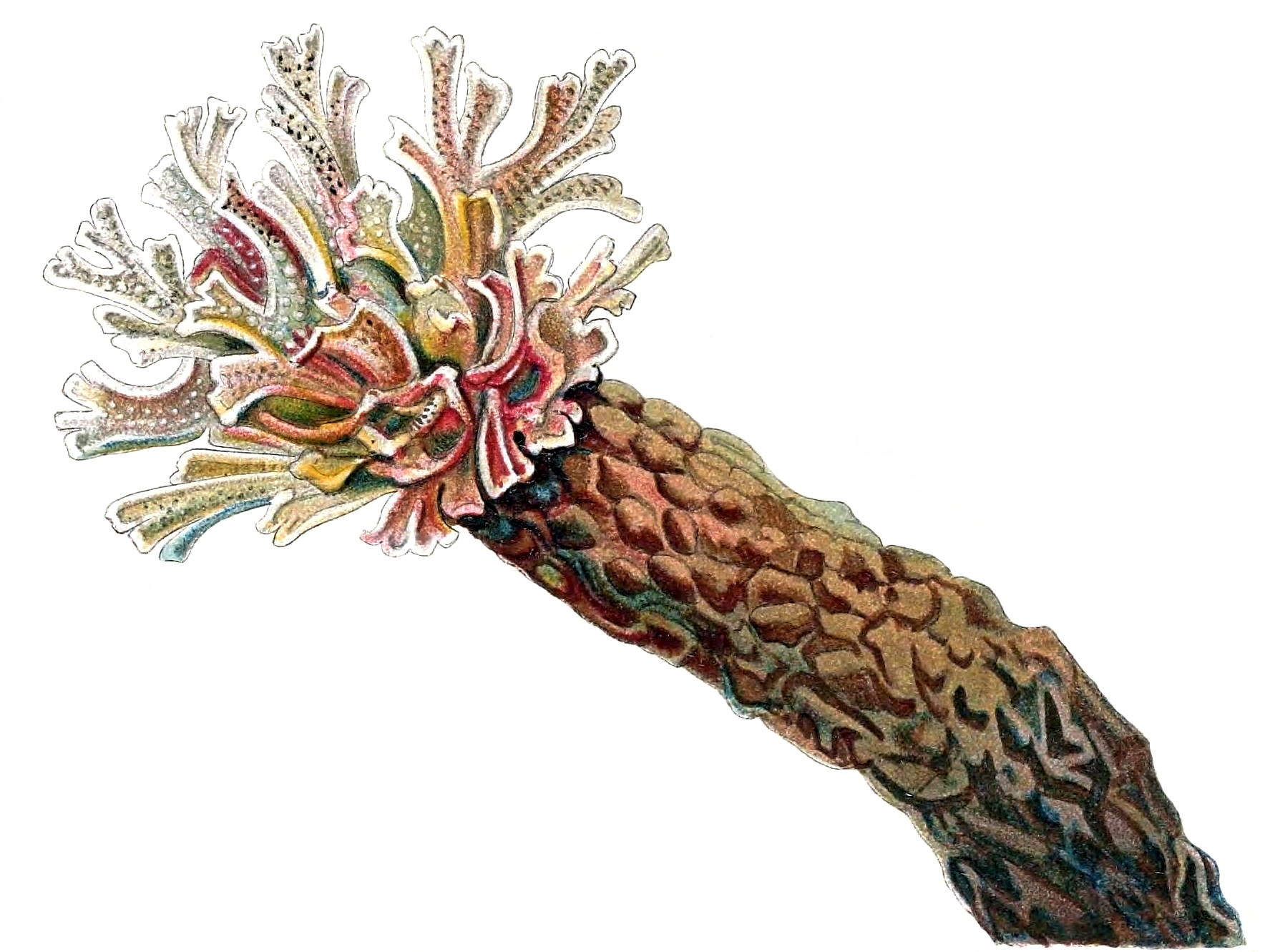
- Owenia fusiformis

Scientific classification
- Kingdom: Animalia
- Phylum: Annelida
- Clade: Palaeoannelida
- Family: Oweniidae
- Genus: Owenia; Delle Chiaje, 1841

Type species
- Owenia fusiformis Delle Chiaje, 1844

Species
- See text

= Owenia (annelid) =

Genus of annelid worms

Owenia is a genus of marine polychaete worms in the family Oweniidae.

== Species by the WoRMS ==
- Owenia artifex Verrill, 1885
- Owenia assimilator Caullery, 1944
- Owenia assimilis Sars, 1851
- Owenia australis Ford & Hutchings, 2005
- Owenia bassensis Ford & Hutchings, 2005
- Owenia borealis Koh, Bhaud & Jirkov, 2003
- Owenia caissara Silva & Lana, 2017
- Owenia caudisetosa Hartmann-Schröder, 1959
- Owenia collaris Hartman, 1955
- Owenia dichotoma Parapar & Moreira, 2015
- Owenia fusiformis Delle Chiaje, 1844
- Owenia gomsoni Koh & Bhaud, 2001
- Owenia johnsoni Blake, 2000
- Owenia mirrawa Ford & Hutchings, 2005
- Owenia persica Martin, Koh, Bhaud, Dutrieux & Gil, 2006
- Owenia petersenae Koh & Bhaud, 2003
- Owenia picta Parapar & Moreira, 2015
- Owenia polaris Koh, Bhaud & Jirkov, 2003
