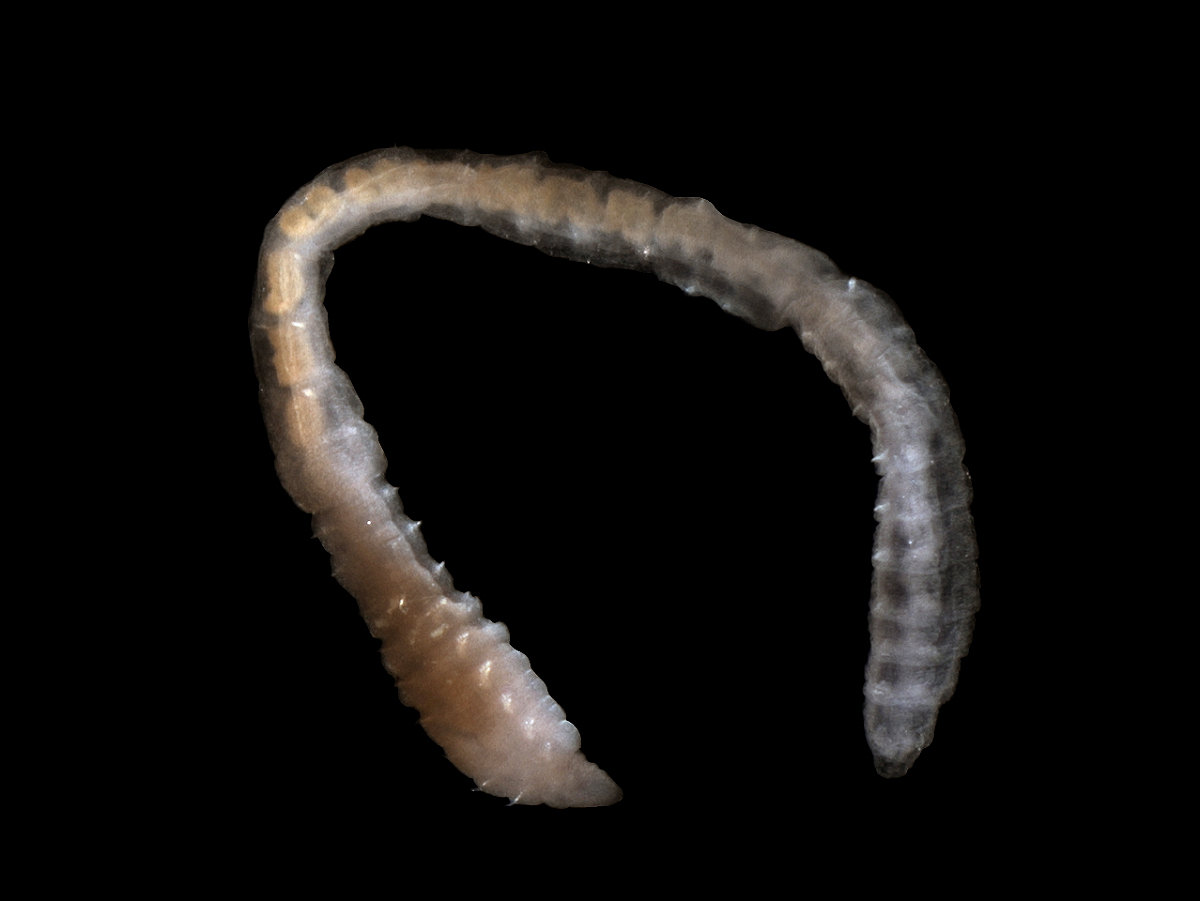
- Capitella capitata

Scientific classification
- Kingdom: Animalia
- Phylum: Annelida
- Clade: Pleistoannelida
- Clade: Sedentaria
- Infraclass: Scolecida

Families
- Aeolosomatidae Arenicolidae Capitellidae Cossuridae Maldanidae Opheliidae Orbiniidae Paraonidae Parergodrilidae Potamodrilidae Psammodrilidae Questidae Scalibregmatidae

= Scolecida =

Subclass of annelid worms

Scolecida is an infraclass of polychaete worms. Scolecids are mostly unselective deposit feeders on marine detritus.

== Characteristics ==
Scolecids have parapodia with rami that are all alike. The prostomium is distinct. The head has no appendages or palps and is usually conical, though in the Scalibregmatidae, it has a T-shaped tip, and in Paraonidae, there is a single, central antenna. In some families there are sometimes some tiny eyespots. The oesophagus is evertible forming a sac-like proboscis which may have several finger-like lobes. The anterior segments and their appendages are all similar. The notopodia and neuropodia consist of unbranched capillary chaetae, sometimes with hooks. There is a single central gill in Cossuridae on an anterior segment and simple segmental gills are present in some other families.

== Systematics ==
The families Arenicolidae, Capitellidae and Maldanidae were formerly part of the order Capitellida. They are now included in infraclass Scolecida along with Cossuridae, Orbiniidae, Opheliidae, Paraonidae and Scalibregmatidae. This clade is probably not a natural grouping and is likely to be revised in the future.

== Subdivisions ==
  - Family Aeolosomatidae
  - Family Arenicolidae
  - Family Capitellidae
  - Family Cossuridae
  - Family Maldanidae
  - Family Opheliidae
  - Family Orbiniidae
  - Family Paraonidae
  - Family Parergodrilidae
  - Family Potamodrilidae
  - Family Psammodrilidae
  - Family Questidae
  - Family Scalibregmatidae
