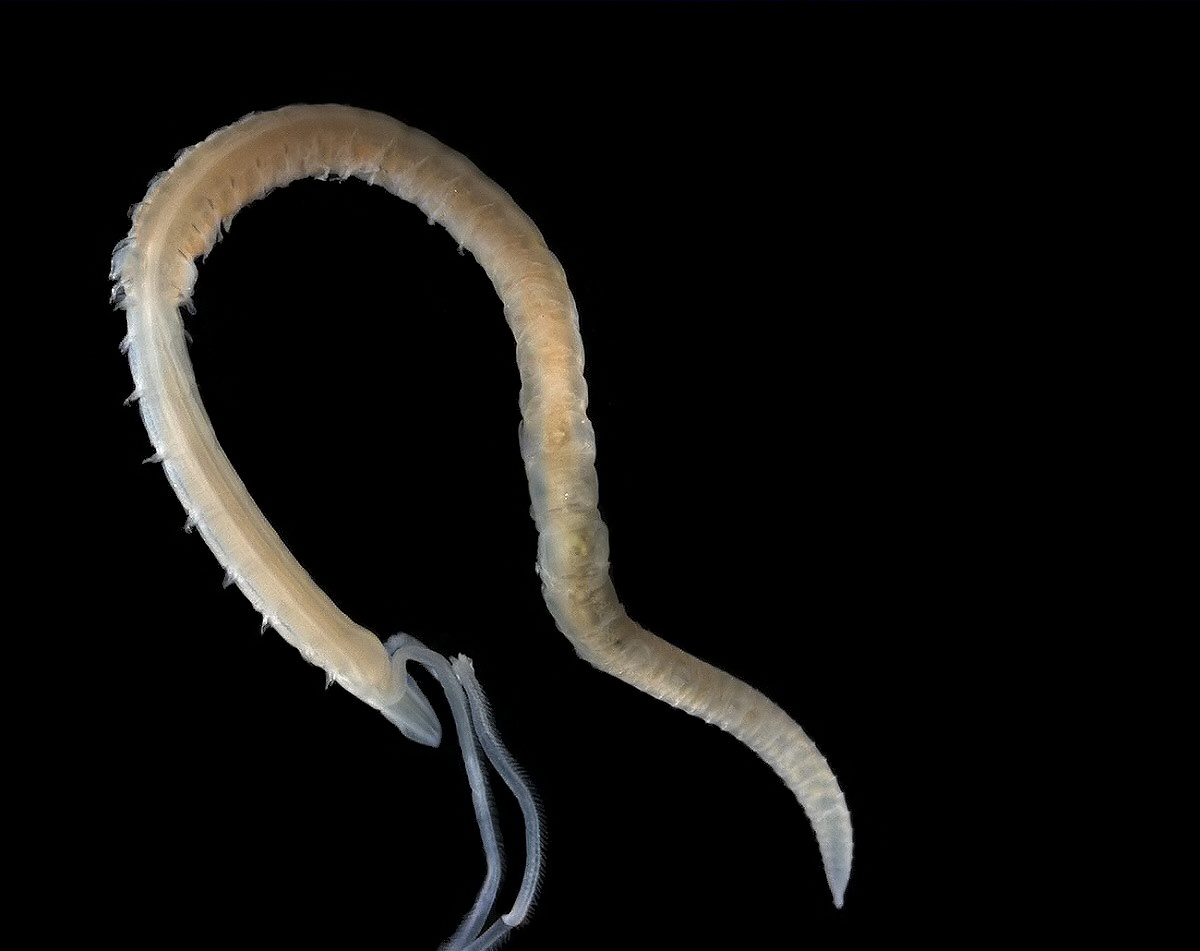
- Magelona johnstoni

Scientific classification
- Kingdom: Animalia
- Phylum: Annelida
- Clade: Palaeoannelida
- Family: Magelonidae
- Genus: Magelona; Müller, 1858

= Magelona =

Genus of annelid worms

Magelona is a genus of annelids belonging to the family Magelonidae.

The genus has cosmopolitan distribution.

== Species ==
Species:

- Magelona agoensis Kitamori, 1967
- Magelona alexandrae Magalhães, Bailey-Brock & Watling, 2018
- Magelona alleni Wilson, 1958
- Magelona dakini (Jones, 1978)
- Magelona japonica (Okuda, 1937)
- Magelona koreana (Okuda, 1937)
- Magelona johnstoni (?)
