= Cossura consimilis =

Scientific classification
- Domain: Eukaryota
- Kingdom: Animalia
- Phylum: Annelida
- Clade: Pleistoannelida
- Clade: Sedentaria
- Family: Cossuridae
- Genus: Cossura
- Species: C. consimilis

Binomial name
- Cossura consimilis Read, 2000

Species of annelid worm

Cossura consimilis is a polychaetid worm distributed throughout New Zealand. Cossura consimilis is a slender thread-like worm with a blunt head, growing up to 20 mm (0.8 in) in length. Cossura consimilis live in muddy sand in shallow intertidal harbours and estuaries, to the inner continental shelf and out to the continental slope. Cossura consimilis tolerates a sediment mud content of 5–65%, with an optimum range of 20–25%.
