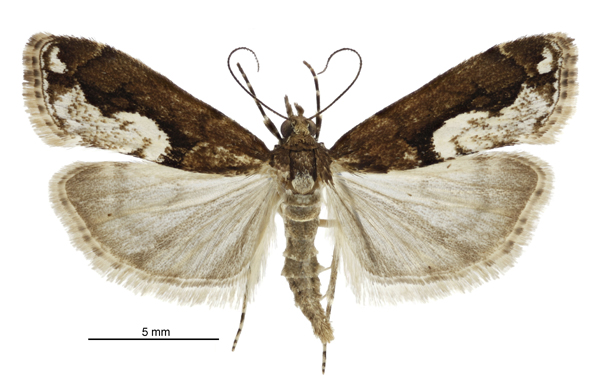
- Female
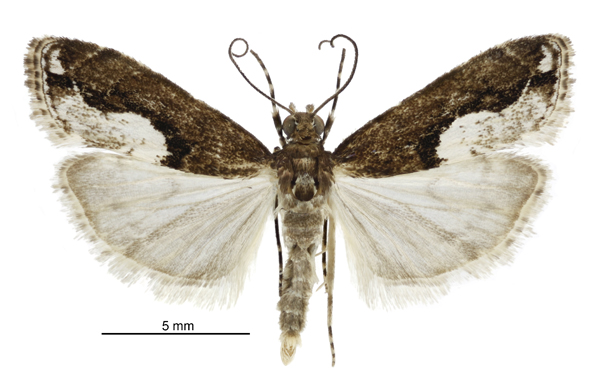
- Male

Scientific classification
- Kingdom: Animalia
- Phylum: Arthropoda
- Clade: Pancrustacea
- Class: Insecta
- Order: Lepidoptera
- Family: Crambidae
- Genus: Eudonia
- Species: E. hemiplaca

Binomial name
- Eudonia hemiplaca (Meyrick, 1899)

Synonyms
- Scoparia hemiplaca Meyrick, 1899

= Eudonia hemiplaca =

Species of moth endemic to New Zealand

Eudonia hemiplaca is a moth in the family Crambidae. It was first described by Edward Meyrick in 1899. It is endemic to New Zealand. It is found throughout the North and South Islands. This species inhabits native forest. Larvae feed on species of moss over winter. Adults are visually distinct and can be recognised by the white blotch on the forewings. This colouration results in the moth mimicking bird droppings, especially when at rest with wings closed. Adults are on the wing from September to May but are most commonly observed from November until January. They are attracted to light.

== Taxonomy ==
This species was first described by Edward Meyrick in 1899 and originally named Scoparia hemiplaca. George Hudson discussed and illustrated this species under the name Scoparia chalara in both his 1892 book An elementary manual of New Zealand entomology and his 1928 book The butterflies and moths of New Zealand. In 1988 John S. Dugdale placed this species in the genus Eudonia. The male holotype, bred by Hudson from a larva collected feeding on moss in Wellington, is held at the Natural History Museum, London.

== Description ==
Colouration mimicking a bird dropping.

Illustration by Hudson.

Meyrick described the male of this species as follows:

♂. 18 mm. Head, palpi, antennae, and thorax dark fuscous ; palpi 2 1/2, base white beneath ; antennal ciliations 1/3. Abdomen light grey, and tuft whitish-ochreous. Legs dark fuscous, apex of joints and posterior tibiae whitish. Fore-wings elongate, moderately dilated posteriorly, costa slightly arched, apex obtuse, hindmargin almost straight, rather oblique, rounded beneath ; dark fuscous, with purplish reflections ; first line obscurely indicated on lower half only, slightly paler than ground-colour ; a suboblong white blotch, sprinkled with fuscous, extending along inner margin from middle to hindmargin, reaching half across wing, its upper anterior angle rounded off, upper side shortly indented in middle ; this blotch is sharply defined, and margined in front and above by a thick black suffusion, in which the lower half of reniform is indicated by an obscure spot of ground-colour ;second line slightly paler than ground-colour, darker-margined, forming a whitish dot on costa, becoming obsolete on the white blotch, but its margins partially indicated by fuscous scales ; an erect wedge-shaped white subapical spot ; a white entire hindmarginal line : cilia ochreous-whitish, with an interrupted dark-grey line, and on upper half of hindmargin with obscure light-grey bars. Hindwings 1 1/4 ; pale grey ; indications of a faint paler postmedian line ; cilia ochreous-whitish, with an interrupted grey line.

This species is distinct and can be recognised by the white blotch on its forewings. The colouration of the forewings ensures the adult mimics bird droppings especially when at rest with wings closed.

== Distribution ==
This species is endemic to New Zealand. Hudson regarded this species as rare. It is found throughout the North Island and South Island.

== Habitat and hosts ==
E. hemiplaca inhabits native forest. Larvae feed on species of moss during the New Zealand winter months.

== Behaviour ==
Adults are on the wing from September to May with adults being most commonly observed from November until January. Adults are attracted to light.
