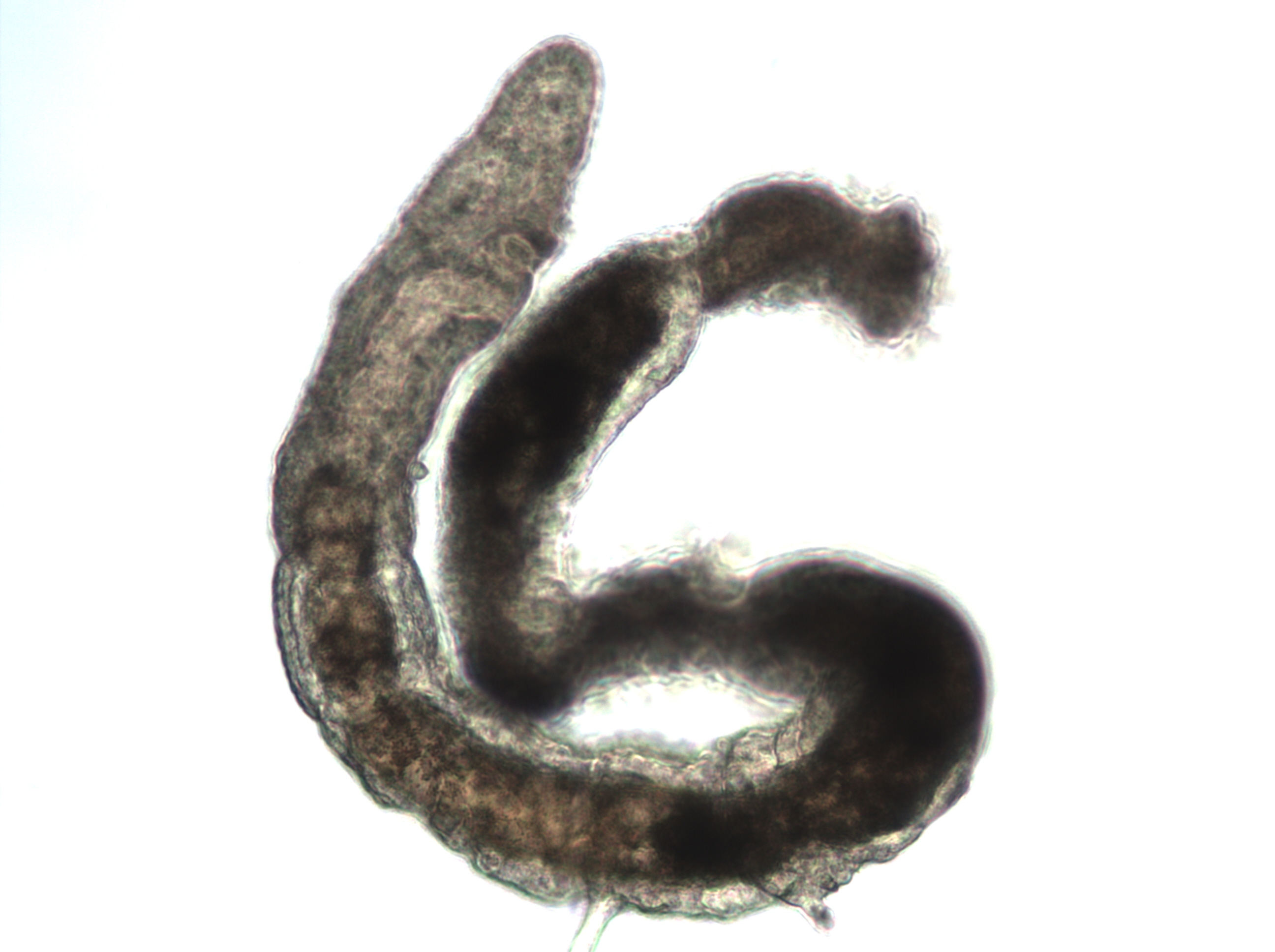

Scientific classification
- Kingdom: Animalia
- Phylum: Annelida
- Family: Psammodrilidae
- Genus: Psammodrilus
- Species: P. balanoglossoides

Binomial name
- Psammodrilus balanoglossoides Swedmark, 1952

= Psammodrilus balanoglossoides =

Species of annelid worm

Psammodrilus balanoglossoides is a species of meiofaunal polychaete annelid only found in France and the North Sea, it is one of the five species representing the genus Psammorilus.

== Morphology ==
Head with elongated, rounded prostomium, that is completely ciliated. Between the prostomium and the peristomium is a ring of long cilia. The peristomium is also ciliated anteriorly and forms a ring, with the mouth appearing midventrally. In the end of the ciliated region of the peristomium a pair of pits are placed. No nuchal organs have been found (Purshcke, 1997). Late development of septum between the collar and the peristomium proper. Body has an anterior 'thorax' with six segments. The first three segments have elongated cylindrical notopodial lobes supported by aciculae. The following segments have shorter notopodial lobes. The abdominal region is characterized by the presence of hooked chaetae. The number of hooks per neuropodial torus ranges from 16-31.

== Ecology ==
Lives in mucous and sand-grain tubes.

== Reproduction ==
Reproduces throughout the year, early summer seems to be the peak period. Gonads in the abdominal region. The sperm have ellipsoidal heads 5μm in diameter, tail about 55μm long. The eggs are 110μm in diameter, a mature female can obtain 75 eggs. Fertilization appears to be external. The larvae development are leicithotrophic and demersal. When the larvae reach about 180μm long they start to feed on diatoms.
