= Hellinsia australis =

Scientific classification
- Domain: Eukaryota
- Kingdom: Animalia
- Phylum: Arthropoda
- Class: Insecta
- Order: Lepidoptera
- Family: Pterophoridae
- Genus: Hellinsia
- Species: H. australis

Binomial name
- Hellinsia australis (Grinnel, 1908)

Synonyms
- Oidaematophorus australis; Pterophorus subochraceus australis Grinnel, 1908

Species of plume moth

Hellinsia australis is a moth of the family Pterophoridae that is found in the U.S. states of California and Utah.

The wingspan is 24–30 millimetres (0.94–1.18 in). The head is white, faintly darkened above and in front. The antennae and palpi are whitish, the latter not longer than the diameter of the eye, slender and oblique. The legs are whitish although front and middle tibiae have dark grey-brown stripes. The thorax and abdomen are yellowish white. The forewings are creamy-whitish along the inner margin, usually darkened in the costal region with a shade of pale ochreous. The fringes are concolorous. The hindwings and their fringes are whitish, faintly tinged with grey.

== Taxonomy ==
Hellinsia australis was described as a subspecies of Hellinsia subochraceus. It is either treated as a synonym of subochraceus or as a valid species.
