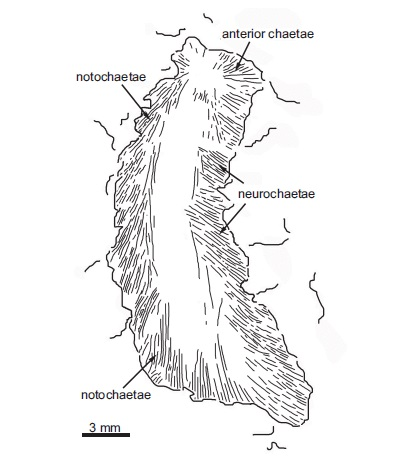
- Sketch of P. canicularis

Scientific classification
- Kingdom: Animalia
- Phylum: Annelida
- Class: Polychaeta
- Genus: †Phragmochaeta
- Species: †P. canicularis

Binomial name
- †Phragmochaeta canicularis Conway Morris & Peel 2008

= Phragmochaeta =

Phragmochaeta Temporal range: Early Cambrian (Atdabanian) ~520–516 Ma

Extinct annelid

Phragmochaeta canicularis is an extinct animal belonging to the annelids and lived in the Early Cambrian (Atdabanian in the local timescale, about 520 million years ago). Fossils have only been found in the Buen Formation at the Sirius Passet Lagerstätte, Greenland and the animal is probably the first polychaete.

== Etymology ==
The genus name Phragmochaeta references the thatch−like appearance of the chaetae, hence reeds (Greek: phragmites). The species epithet canicularis is derived from the Latin for "dog" (canis) in reference to Sirius ("dog-star") Passet.

== Description ==
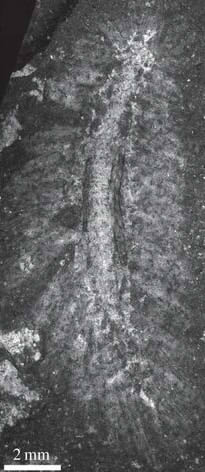

Drawing from roughly 40 fossils Phragmochaeta consisted of about twenty segments, each of which carried structures typical of the annelids polychaetes (notochaetae and neurochaetae). The notochaetae seemed to cover the entire dorsal surface, while the neurochaetae projected obliquely along the axis of the body. The head is not well known, but it seems there was no type of jaw. The intestine was unbent and has large longitudinal musculature.

== Lifestyle ==
It probably was a benthic animal, which lived on the bottom of the sea and probably ate particles present on the seabed. This animal moved thanks to the neurochete, while the dorsal notochets provided protection.

== Classification ==
This animal belonged to the annelates polychaetes, a group of animals currently represented by numerous marine species. Already in the middle Cambrian of Burgess Shales they were present with numerous species (Burgessochaeta, Canadia, Peronochaeta), but Phragmochaeta, antecedent of some millions of years, represents the oldest polychaete and was probably one of the most primitive.

== Importance ==
General anatomy of a polychaete

Polychaetes are rare in the Maotianshan Shales, in China, also dating back to the lower Cambrian. This is particularly surprising because the Chinese field has a very wide biological variety. The only Cambrian field containing polychaetes is that of Burgess Shale, in Canada, a little later. Phragmochaeta, therefore, represents an exception as the oldest known polychaete.

== Bibliography ==
- Conway Morris, Simon; Peel, John S. (2008), "The earliest annelids: Lower Cambrian polychaetes from the Sirius Passet Lagerstätte, Peary Land, North Greenland" (PDF), Acta Palaeontologica Polonica, 53: 137–148, doi:10.4202/app.2008.0110
