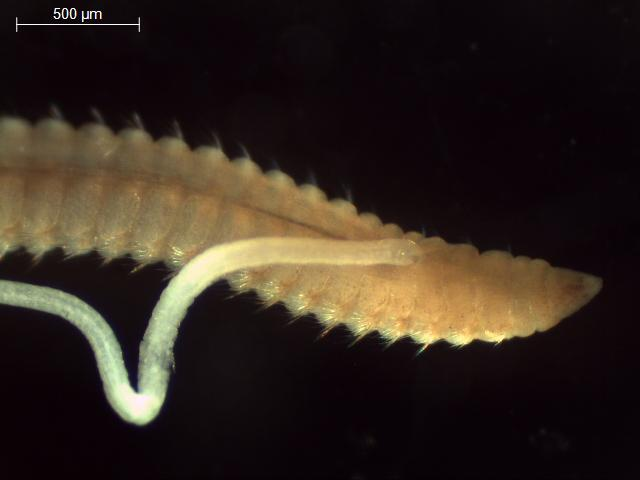
- Cossura bansei

Scientific classification
- Kingdom: Animalia
- Phylum: Annelida
- Clade: Pleistoannelida
- Clade: Sedentaria
- Family: Cossuridae; Day, 1963
- Genus: Cossura; Webster & Benedict, 1887

Species
- See text

= Cossura (annelid) =

Order of annelid worms

Cossuridae is a monotypic family of polychaetes belonging to the class Polychaeta. Its sole accepted genus is Cossura.

Thirty species are accepted within Cossura:

- Cossura abyssalis Hartman, 1967
- Cossura aciculata (Wu & Chen, 1977)
- Cossura alba Hartman, 1967
- Cossura bansei Hilbig, 1996
- Cossura brunnea Fauchald, 1972
- Cossura candida Hartman, 1955
- Cossura chilensis Hartmann-Schröder, 1965
- Cossura coasta Kitamori, 1960
- Cossura consimilis Read, 2000
- Cossura dayi Hartman, 1976
- Cossura delta Reish, 1958
- Cossura dimorpha (Hartman, 1976)
- Cossura duplex Tamai, 1986
- Cossura flabelligera Zhadan, 2017
- Cossura ginesi Liñero-Arana & Díaz-Díaz, 2010
- Cossura heterochaeta Orensanz, 1976
- Cossura hutchingsae Zhadan, 2015
- Cossura keablei Zhadan, 2015
- Cossura laeviseta Hartmann-Schröder, 1962
- Cossura longocirrata Webster & Benedict, 1887
- Cossura modica Fauchald & Hancock, 1981
- Cossura pettiboneae (Ewing, 1987)
- Cossura platypus Zhadan, 2017
- Cossura pseudakaina (Ewing, 1987)
- Cossura pygodactylata Jones, 1956
- Cossura queenslandensis Zhadan, 2015
- Cossura rostrata Fauchald, 1972
- Cossura sima Fauchald, 1972
- Cossura soyeri Laubier, 1964
- Cossura yacy Sousa, Nogueira, Cutrim & Oliveira, 2019
