= Palp =

Organ in the mouthparts of animals

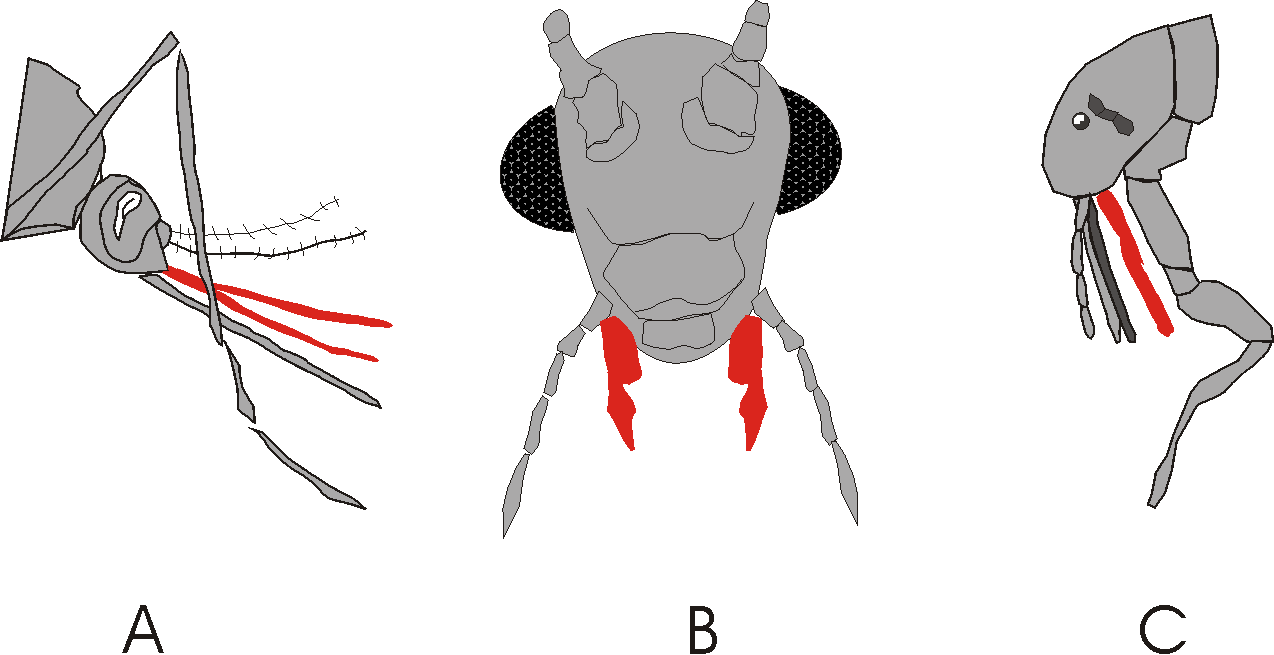
Schematic representation of palps (in red) in: A. Anopheles, B. Orthoptera, C. a flea

A palp (also called palpus, from latin palpare "to pat, touch") is an organ in the mouthparts of various animals. For example, palps are found in various annelids, insects, arachnids and crustaceans. (Note: From a phylogenetic standpoint, insects are a group of crustaceans. See Pancrustacea for further details.) They are always arranged in pairs.

The term "palp" can be misleading, as many animals use them for more than only as an organ of touch. Often palps have bristles packed densely, which are not only used for touch, but also for chemoreception.

== Arthropods ==
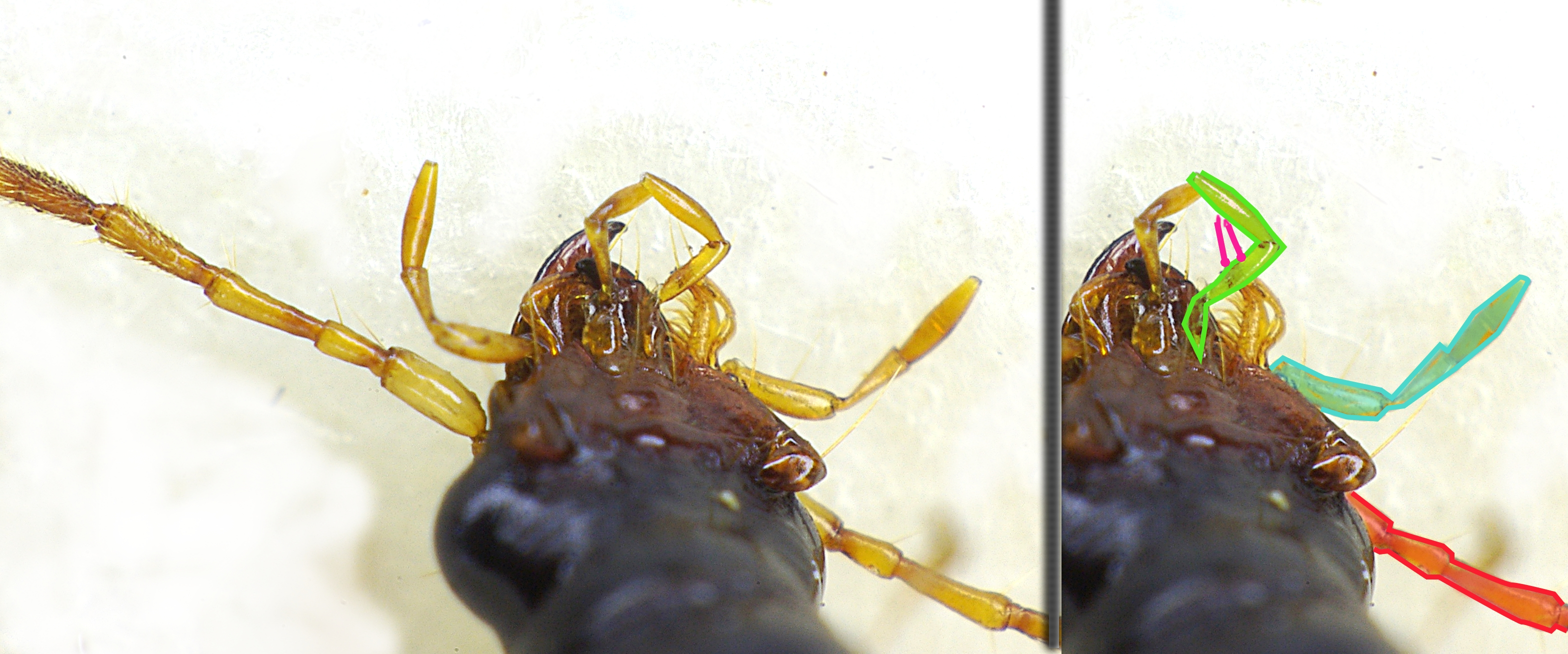
Head of a beetle (Paranchus albipes) seen from below, partially coloured on the right. Red: antennae Blue-green: maxillary palp Green: labial palp Pink: pair of bristles on the second to last segment of the labial palp

In some groups, such as beetles and lepidopterans, labial and maxillary palps (palpus labialis and maxillaris, respectively) can be distinguished. The formers are attached to the labium, while the latter to the maxillae.

Pedipalps are multifunctional organs of arachnids. They can be used for communication (stridulation, substrate or web percussion, optical signals), but also courtship display, mating (in spiders) or movement (palpigrades). Pedipalps can be modified into pincers or as bite and digging instruments (mites). In this last group, palps have a simple, linear form, made of four segments, while other arachnids mostly have palps made up of five segments.

For insects and spiders form, placement, and inner construction of the palps, as well as their presence or lack thereof are used as determination characteristics.

== Annelids ==
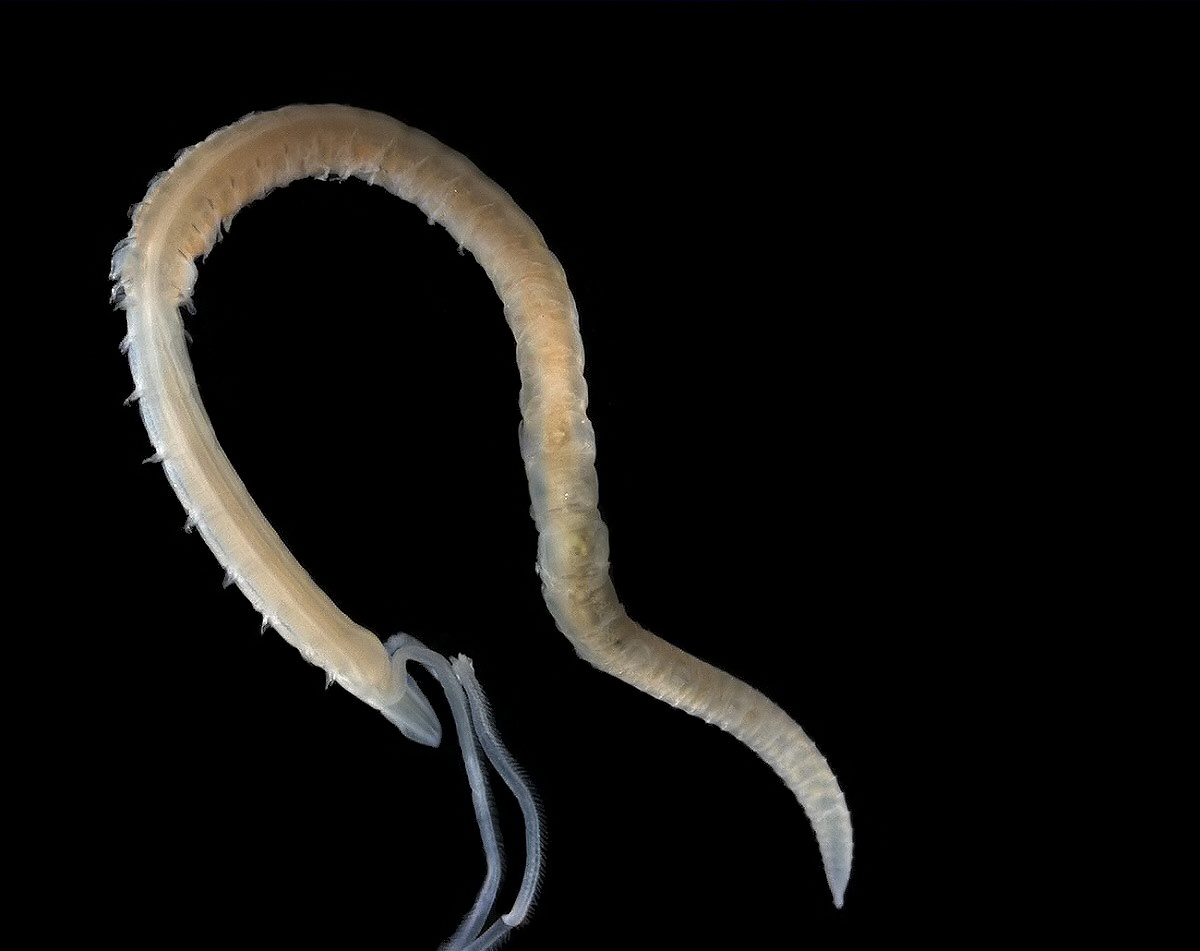
The magelonid Magelona johnstoni, down on the left both long palps are shown

In annelids palps can be used for nutrition or as sense organs; normally the former are long and filiform, while the latter are stud. Those that are used for nutrition can have a ciliated groove, through which nourishment is transported. It is assumed that the last common ancestor of all annelids had palps (it is a plesiomorphic character of annelids).

Palps are present in Magelonidae and Oweniidae (these families constitute Palaeoannelida), just as in Chaetopterida, in Errantia (in the families Protodrilidae, Saccocirridae and Dorviellidae) and in Sedentaria (in the families Sabellariidae, Siboglinidae, Terebellidae, Spionidae and Cirratuliformia). In the family Amphinomidae there are five similar sense organs: a central antenna, a pair of lateral antennae and a further pair of sense organs, sometimes called "antennae" and sometimes "palps". The larva of the Amphinomidae (Rostraria larva) has a pair of palps for nourishment.

== Molluscs ==
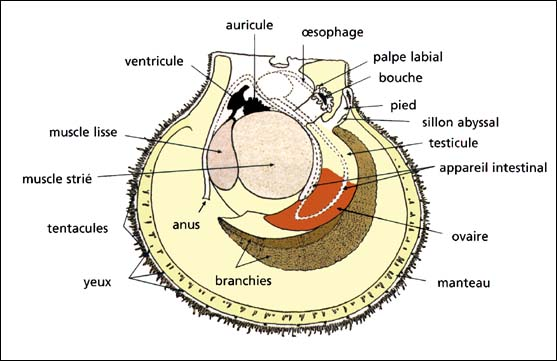
Anatomy of a scallop, in the top right a labial palp (palpe labial) is shown

Bivalves, with the exeption of Protobranchia, have three structures with which they filter the water: the gills, the lips and the labial palp. The labial palps in scallops are two pairs of lobes on the mouth margin, they can have cilia and cells that produce mucus (mucocites).

In some carnivorous gastropods lateral labial palps are present, that help the animals find food.
