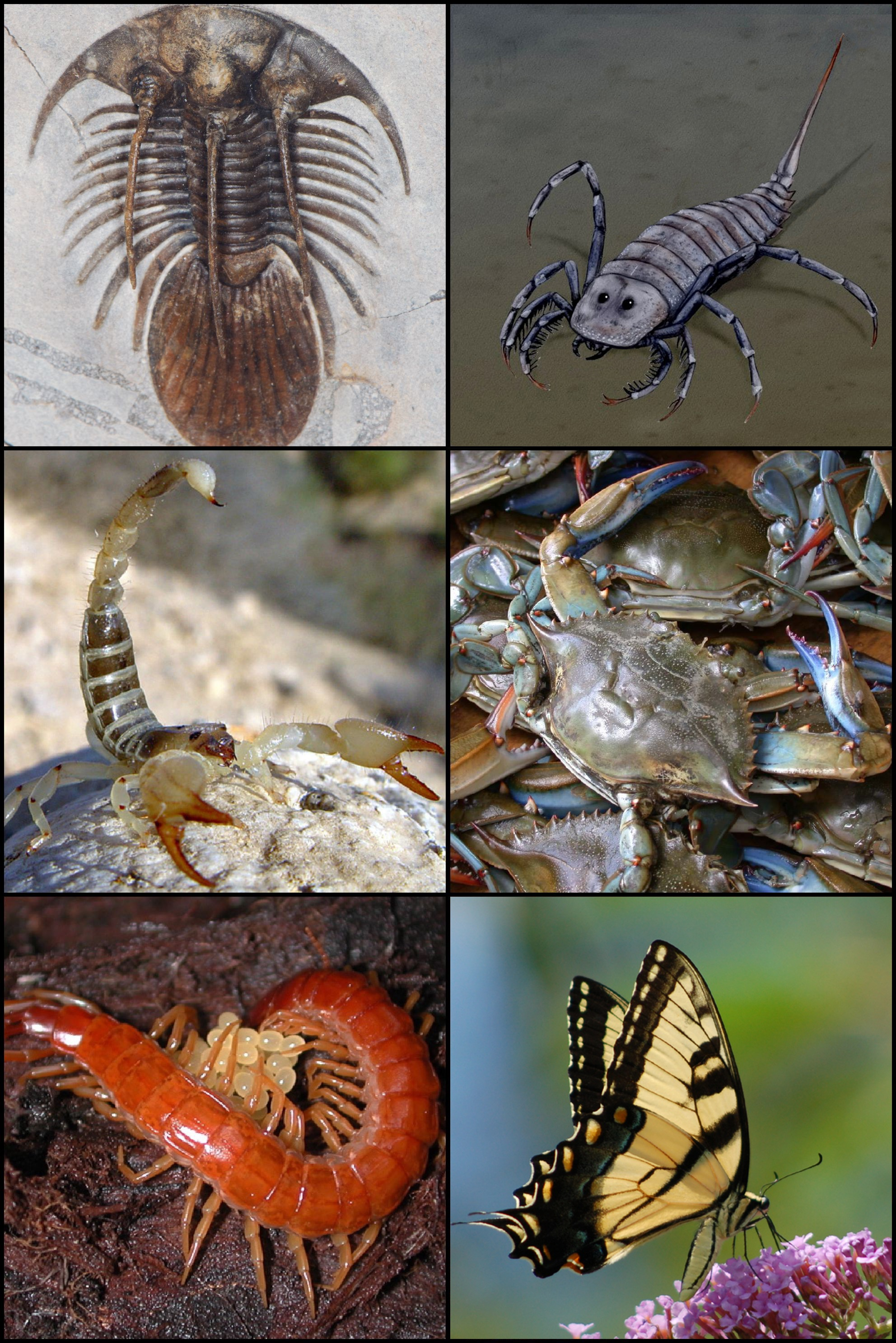
- Extinct and modern arthropods
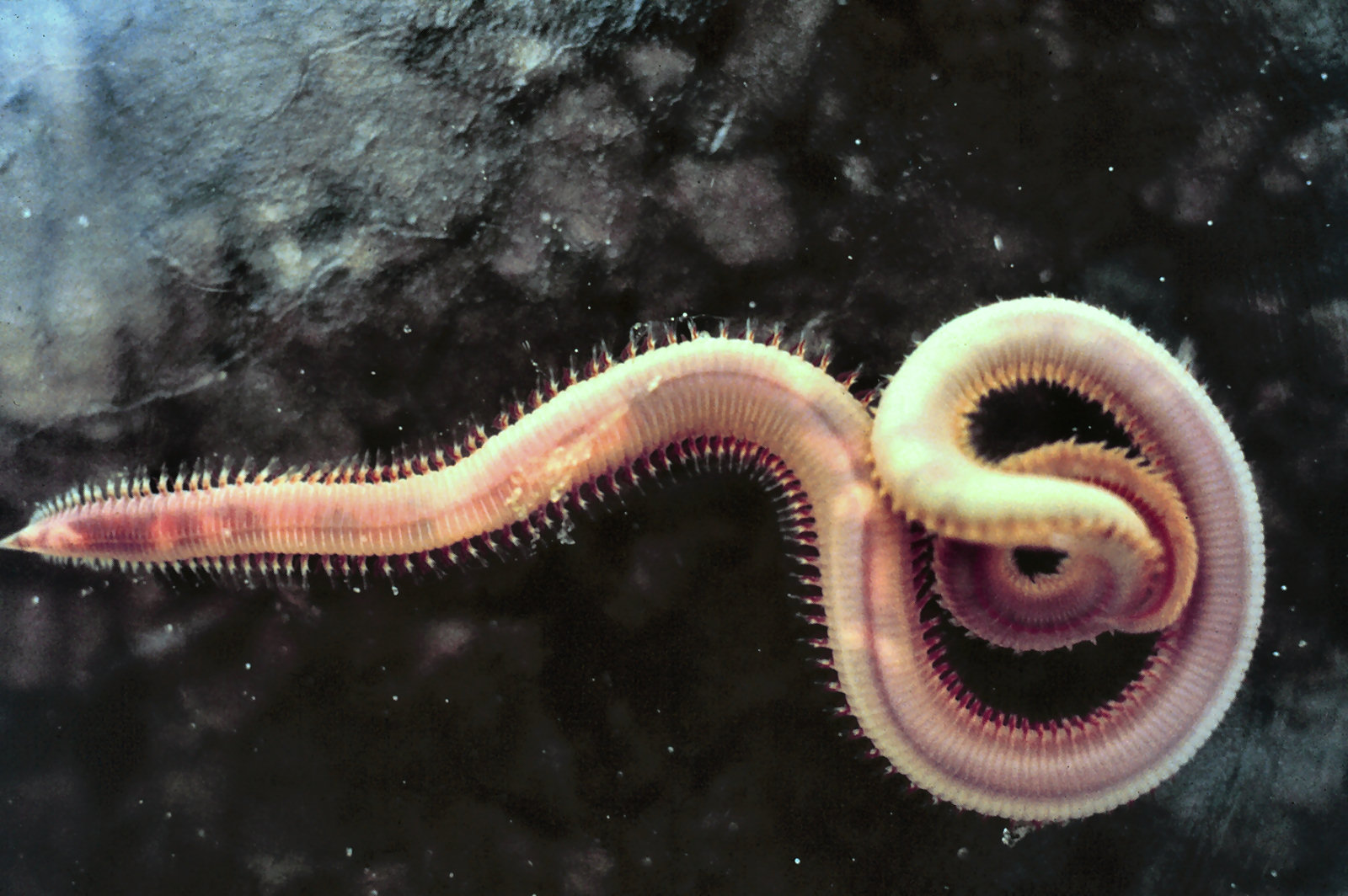
- Glycera sp. (Annelida)

Scientific classification
- Kingdom: Animalia
- (unranked): Protostomia
- Superphylum: Articulata H. Bruce Boudreaux, 1979

Subordinate taxa
- Panarthropoda; Annelida

= Articulata (superphylum) =

Ancestral origin theory

The Articulata is a proposed higher taxon of animals with segmented bodies, consisting of Annelida and Panarthropoda. This theory states that these groups are descended from a common segmented ancestor. The Articulata hypothesis is an alternative to the hypothesis that ecdysis (the shedding of outer cuticle) is a primitive characteristic – this would place Panarthropoda in the group Ecdysozoa.

== Origins ==
The Articulata hypothesis originates from the phylogenetic analyses of Georges Cuvier in his 1817 published work Le Règne animal, distribué après son organization. In this work, Cuvier theorized that all organisms exist as a functional whole, meaning that all of the physiological structures of an organism are important for survival. By studying these physiological structures, Cuvier was able to group the known animal kingdom according to structural similarities resulting from what he referred to as special "ground-plans", which are analogous to blueprints. Each of these ground-plans, he further argued, evolved separately from the others and structural similarities were due to common function and not to common ancestry. From these ground-plans, Cuvier separated the known animal kingdom into four branches or embranchements: Vertebrata, Articulata, Mollusca and Radiata. From this phylogenetic grouping, the Articulata hypothesis was born.

The Articulata hypothesis, simply stated, is the phylogenetic grouping of the phylum Annelida (which includes polychaetes, oligochaetes, and leeches) together with the phylum Arthropoda (arachnids, insects and crustaceans) into the common taxon Articulata. Cuvier grouped these diverse phyla together according to the common structural feature: the segmented body plan. This hypothesis further implies that all segmented organisms have a common ancestral origin.

== Development ==
Since its original formulation in 1817, there have been significant challenges and modifications to the Articulata hypothesis as new theories have been accepted (Charles Darwin's theory of evolution) and new technologies have become available (confocal microscopy, DNA sequencing, genomics). Additionally, the discovery of Onychophora as its own phylum was incorporated into the theory by H. Bruce Bordreaux

=== Theory of evolution ===
Darwin's theory of evolution had a large, yet often understated impact of the Articulata hypothesis. Cuvier's original Articulata hypothesis was based on his assumption that current species no longer evolved because to evolve would cause loss of integral structures necessary for the survival of the species. While the general acceptance of the theory of evolution weakened Cuvier's general theory of the unique ground-plans as the origin of modern taxa, it strengthened the Articulata hypothesis by organizing annelids and arthropods into a clade descended from a common segmented ancestor.

=== Confocal microscopy and modern molecular biology techniques ===
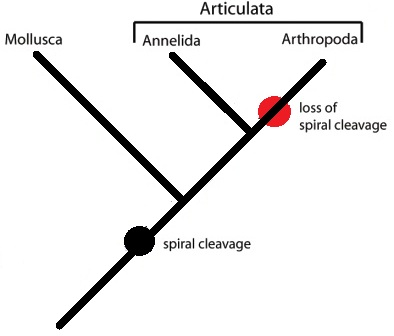

While each advance in modern molecular biology has shaken the phylogenetic tree of Bilateria, advances in molecular biology techniques led to further data supporting the Articulata hypothesis but also led to the development of conflicting theories. Advances in confocal microscopy technology led to the discovery of embryonic cleavage patterns, which differs between the annelids and arthropods. Annelids show spiral cleavage, meaning that each embryonic cleavage occurs at progressive 90-degree angles with respect to the animal–vegetal axis. Arthropods, on the other hand, display a heterogeneous mix of embryonic cleavage patterns including spiral-like cleavage and radial cleavage patterns. This led researchers to two theories: The first was that the arthropods lineage must have lost the ability to spiral cleave since differentiating from the last common ancestor between annelids and arthropods. The second is that this showed similarities between annelids and mollusks who also spirally cleaves but lacks that the segmented body plan. This was not the only interpretation of this data but other hypotheses were seen to have less data or merit. Other studies such as those looking a neural patterns within the Articulata clade showed mixed patterns and thus mixed results.

=== DNA sequencing and genomics ===
The advancements in DNA sequencing techniques and the development of phylogenetic analysis algorithms led to the splitting of the Articulata clade. Original phylogenetic studies on the sequences of 18S and 28S ribosomal DNA sequence led to the suggestions that the annelids and arthropods had evolutionarily diverged much earlier than was previously thought but such limited genetic studies led to limited and often mixed results. As more genes were added to the studies, it became apparent that arthropods were genetically closer to nematodes and other molting organisms whereas the annelids were closer evolutionary to mollusks. This Ecdysozoa hypothesis is generally accepted today as the best supported evolutionary hypothesis for annelids and arthropods. However, a 2025 paper still suggests Articulata is monophyletic, alongside Atelocerata, despite the vast majority of papers favouring Mandibulata and Ecdysozoa instead. While Ecdysozoa is recovered within the paper, cycloneuralians are instead found to be simplified lobopodians. Alongside this, Articulata is hypothesised to have descended from spintherid-like crawling annelids.

== See also ==
- Proarticulata
