= Hellinsia subochraceus =

Scientific classification
- Kingdom: Animalia
- Phylum: Arthropoda
- Clade: Pancrustacea
- Class: Insecta
- Order: Lepidoptera
- Family: Pterophoridae
- Genus: Hellinsia
- Species: H. subochraceus

Binomial name
- Hellinsia subochraceus (Walsingham, 1880)

Synonyms
- Lioptilus subochraceus Walsingham, 1880

Species of moth

Hellinsia subochraceus is a moth of the family Pterophoridae. It is found in North America (including California, Oregon and Alberta).

The wingspan is 24–26 mm. The head is whitish above and the face and neck are brownish. The antennae are whitish ochreous, with the basal joint brown. The forewings are cream white, with a few scattered brown scales. There is a brown spot before the base of the fissure and another between that and the costa. The fringes are cream white, tinged with brown on the outer margin. The hindwings are very pale cinereous and the fringes are slightly darker about the ends of the feathers.

The larvae have been recorded feeding on Helianthus species.

== Taxonomy ==
Hellinsia australis was described as a subspecies of Hellinsia subochraceus. It is either treated as a synonym of subochraceus or as a valid species, Hellinsia australis.
