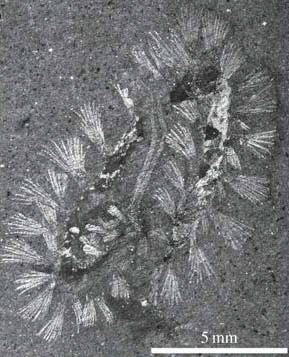

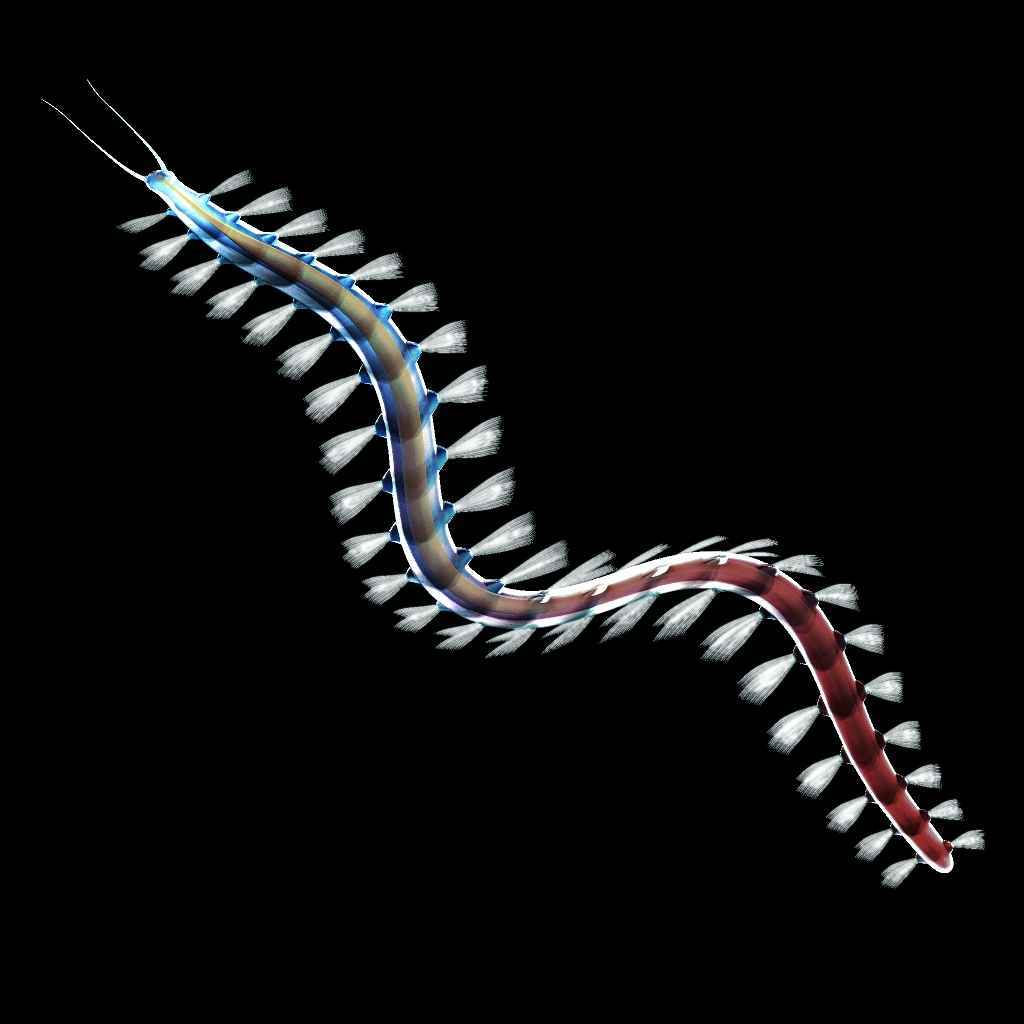
- Reconstruction of Burgessochaeta setigera

Scientific classification
- Kingdom: Animalia
- Phylum: Annelida
- Class: Polychaeta
- Family: †Burgessochaetidae; Conway Morris, 1979
- Genus: †Burgessochaeta; Conway Morris, 1979
- Species: †B. setigera

Binomial name
- †Burgessochaeta setigera (Walcott, 1911)

Synonyms
- Canadia setigera Walcott, 1911

= Burgessochaeta =

Burgessochaeta Temporal range: Middle Cambrian

Fossil marine worm

Burgessochaeta is an extinct genus of polychaete annelids from the Middle Cambrian. Its fossils have been found in the Burgess Shale in British Columbia, Canada. The genus was described by Conway Morris (1979) and re-examined by Eibye-Jacobsen (2004).

== Physical characteristics ==
Burgessochaeta had two long tentacles on its head. The rest of the body had between 16 and 30 segments (possibly indicating multiple species). Each segment had two groups of long chaetae on it, which Burgessochaeta presumably used to swim. Burgessochaeta is not thought to have had eyes. The body grew slightly wider towards the posterior end of the animal.

== Ecology ==
A total of 189 specimens of Burgessochaeta are known from the Greater Phyllopod bed, where they comprise 0.36% of the community. Specimens have also been found at Marble Canyon, and the Spence Shale.

Burgessochaeta is thought to have been a decomposer or scavenger on organic material. It probably swam, as its bristles were much too long to be useful for moving itself in a burrow. Specimens have been found from both continental slope and deep-water environments, indicating that this was a widespread animal.

== General sources ==
- The Crucible of Creation: The Burgess Shale and the Rise of Animals by Simon Conway-Morris
