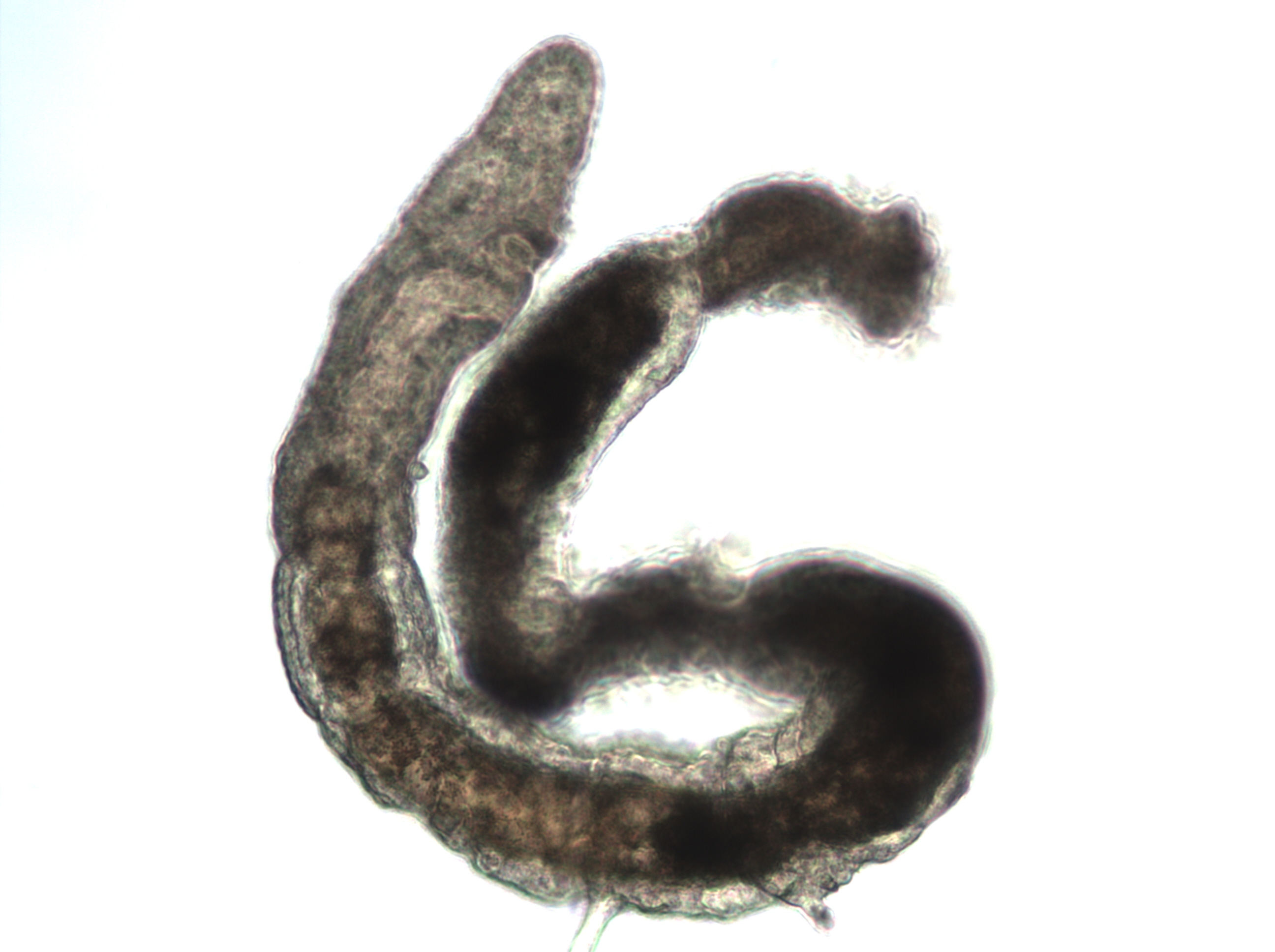
- Psammodrilus balanoglossoides

Scientific classification
- Kingdom: Animalia
- Phylum: Annelida
- Class: Polychaeta
- Family: Psammodrilidae; Swedmark, 1952
- Genus: Psammodrilus; Swedmark, 1952

= Psammodrilus =

Genus of annelid worm

Psammodrilus is a genus of meiofaunal polychaete annelid. It is the only member of the family Psammodrilidae.

== Taxonomy ==
- Psammodrilus aedificator Kristensen & Nørrevang, 1982
- Psammodrilus balanoglossoides Swedmark, 1952
- Psammodrilus curinigallettii Worsaae, Kvindebjerg & Martínez, 2015
- Psammodrilus didomenicoi Worsaae & Martínez in Worsaae et al., 2018
- Psammodrilus fauveli (Swedmark, 1958)
- Psammodrilus moebjergi Worsaae & Sterrer, 2006
- Psammodrilus norenburgi Worsaae & Martínez in Worsaae et al., 2018
- Psammodrilus swedmarki Worsaae & Sterrer, 2006
