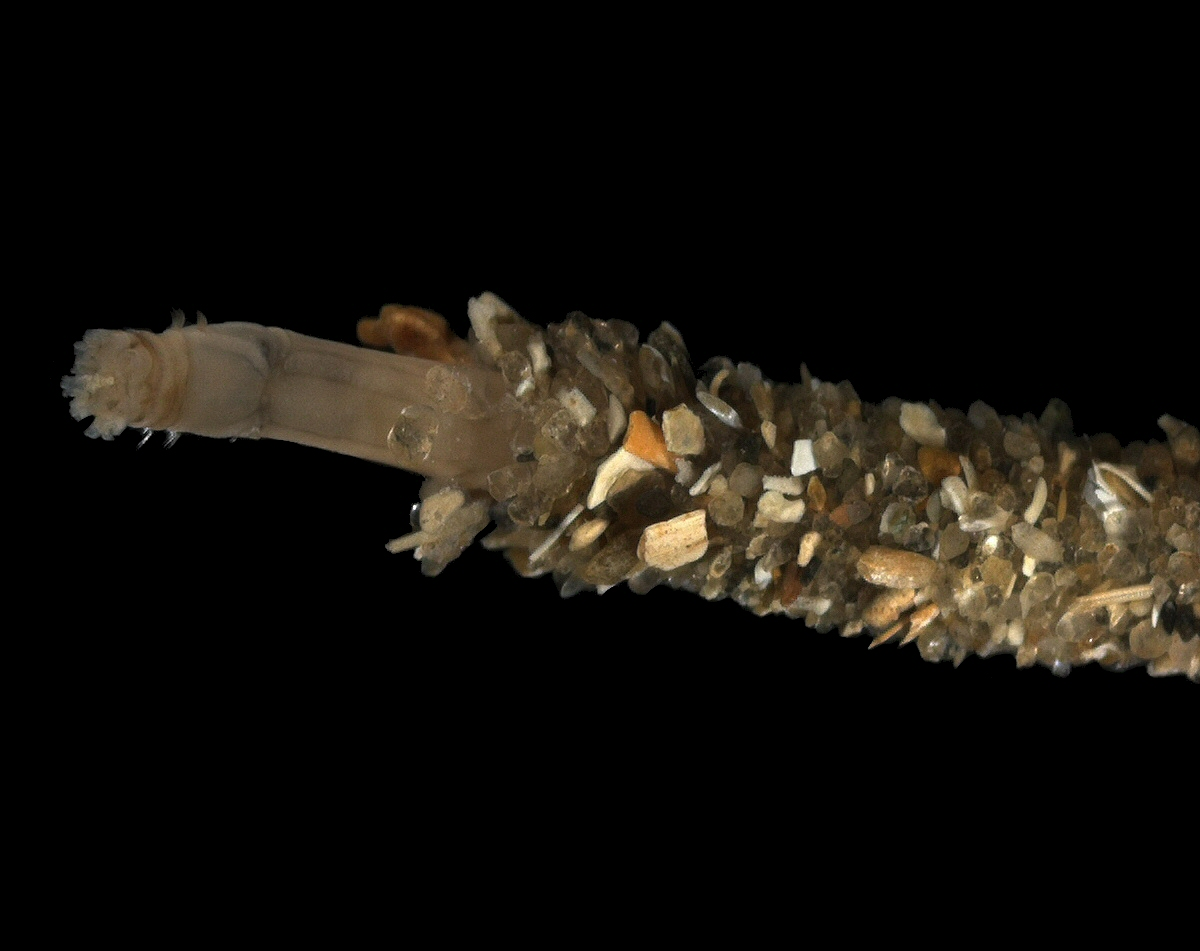
- Owenia fusiformis

Scientific classification
- Kingdom: Animalia
- Phylum: Annelida
- Clade: Palaeoannelida
- Family: Oweniidae; Rioja, 1917

Genera
- Galathowenia; Myriochele; Myriowenia; Owenia

= Oweniidae =

Family of annelid worms

Oweniidae is a family of marine polychaete worms in the clade Palaeoannelida. The worms live in tubes made of sand and are selective filter feeders, detritivores and grazers.

== Characteristics ==
Members of this family live in tubes made of sand and shell fragments. The head of the worm does not bear a proboscis, but has the mouth at the tip rimmed by some very short tentacles. The body segments lack parapodia and are smooth elongated cylinders. There are a large number of hooked chaetae or bristles on a small pad on the ventral side of each segment. These chaetae have two parallel teeth resembling claws which is a feature that distinguishes members of this family from other polychaetes. The posterior tip bears different appendages in different genera. Family members are unique in having a bell-shaped larval stage known as a mitraria larva. At one time the family was classified as the Ammocharidae.

== Genera ==
- Galathowenia Kirkegaard, 1959
- Myriochele Malmgren, 1867
- Myriowenia Hartman, 1960
- Owenia Delle Chiaje, 1844
