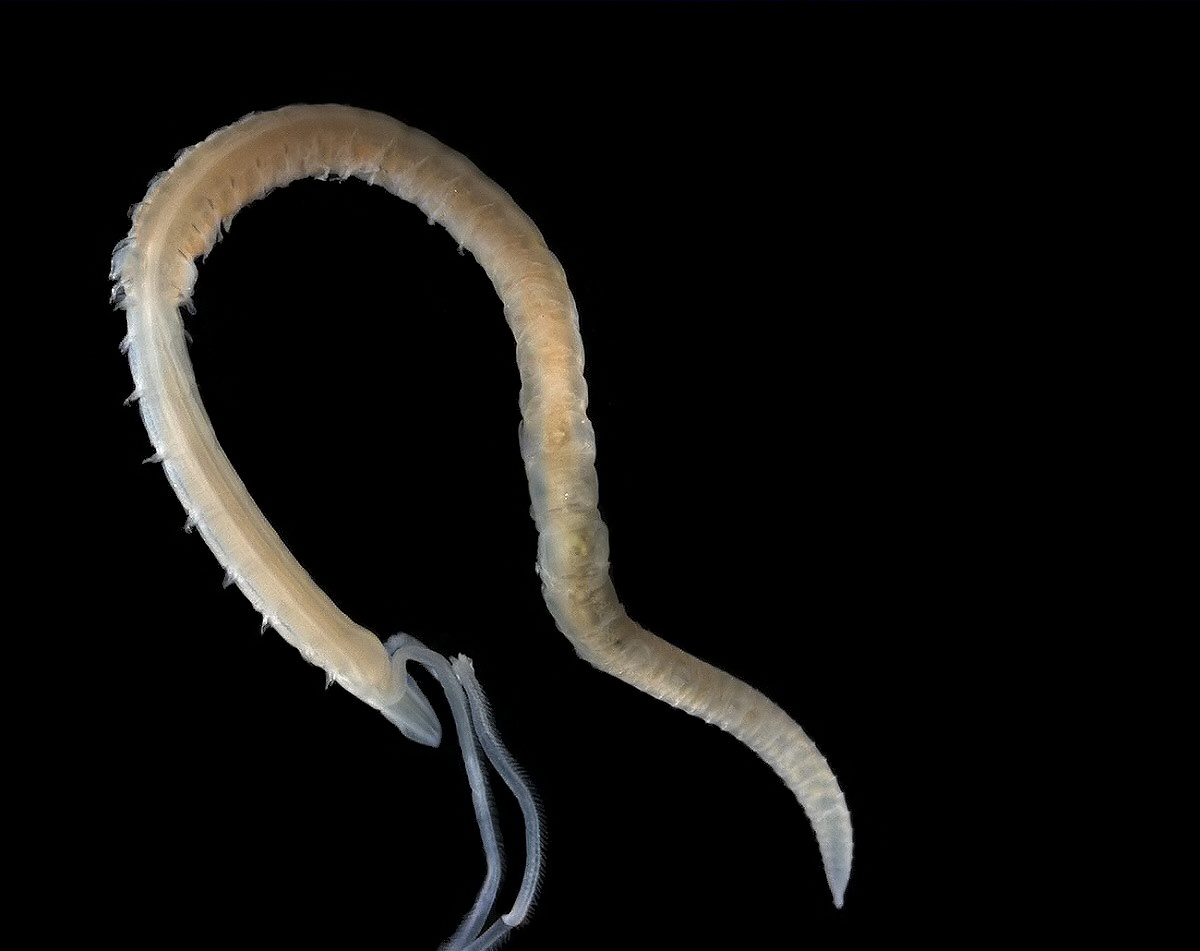
- Magelona johnstoni

Scientific classification
- Kingdom: Animalia
- Phylum: Annelida
- Clade: Palaeoannelida
- Family: Magelonidae; Cunningham & Ramage, 1888

= Magelonidae =

Family of annelid worms

Magelonidae is a family of annelid worms in Palaeoannelida.

Genera:

- Dannychaeta Chen, Parry, Vinther, Zhai, Hou & Ma, 2020
- Magelona Müller, 1858
- Meridithia Hernández-Alcántara & Solís-Weiss, 2000
- Octomagelona Aguirrezabalaga, Ceberio & Fiege, 2001
