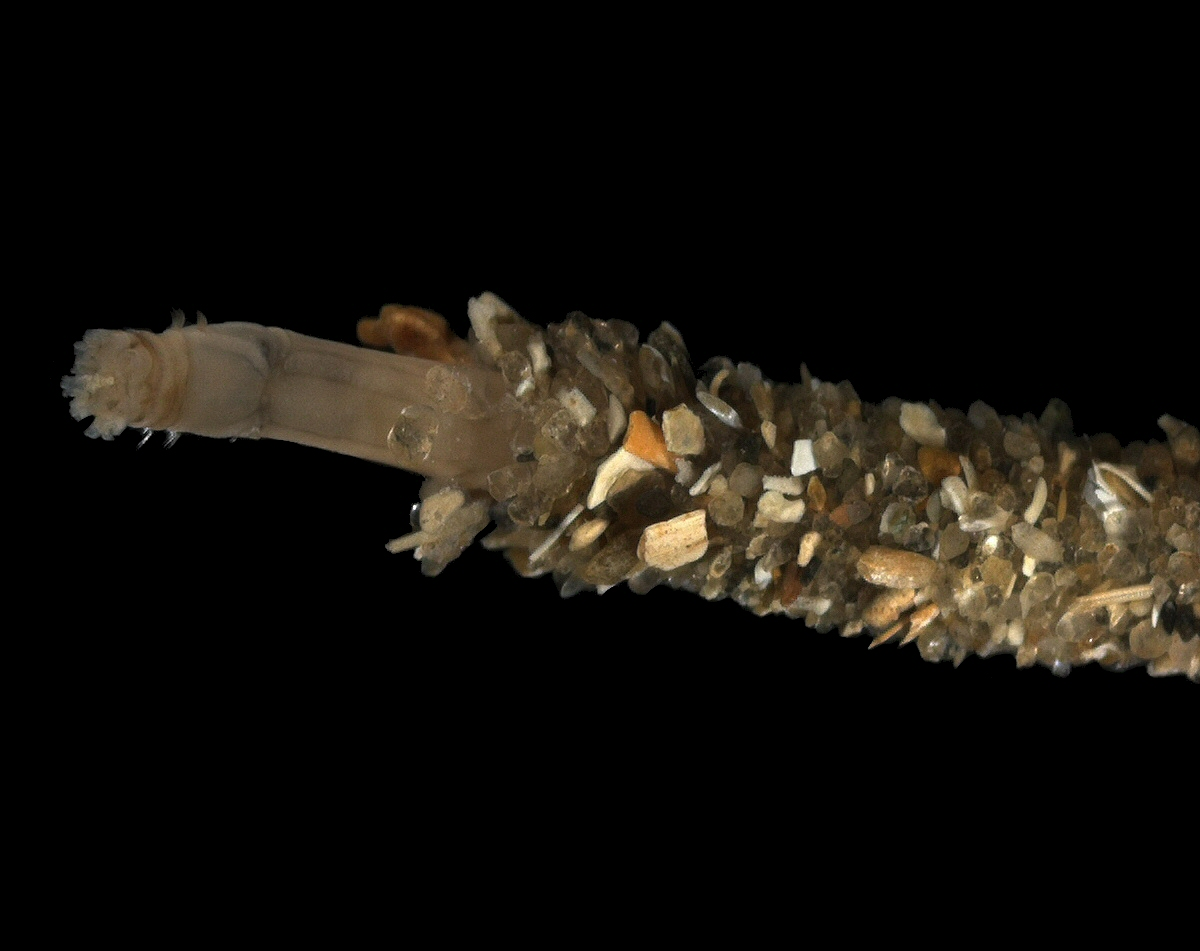
- Owenia fusiformis

Scientific classification
- Kingdom: Animalia
- Phylum: Annelida
- Clade: Palaeoannelida; Weigert & Bleidorn, 2016

Families
- Oweniidae; Magelonidae

= Palaeoannelida =

Order of annelid worms

Palaeoannelida is a monophyletic taxon of marine polychaetes containing two families: Oweniidae and Magelonidae. Members of this group possess monociliated epidermal cells and lack a nuchal organ.
