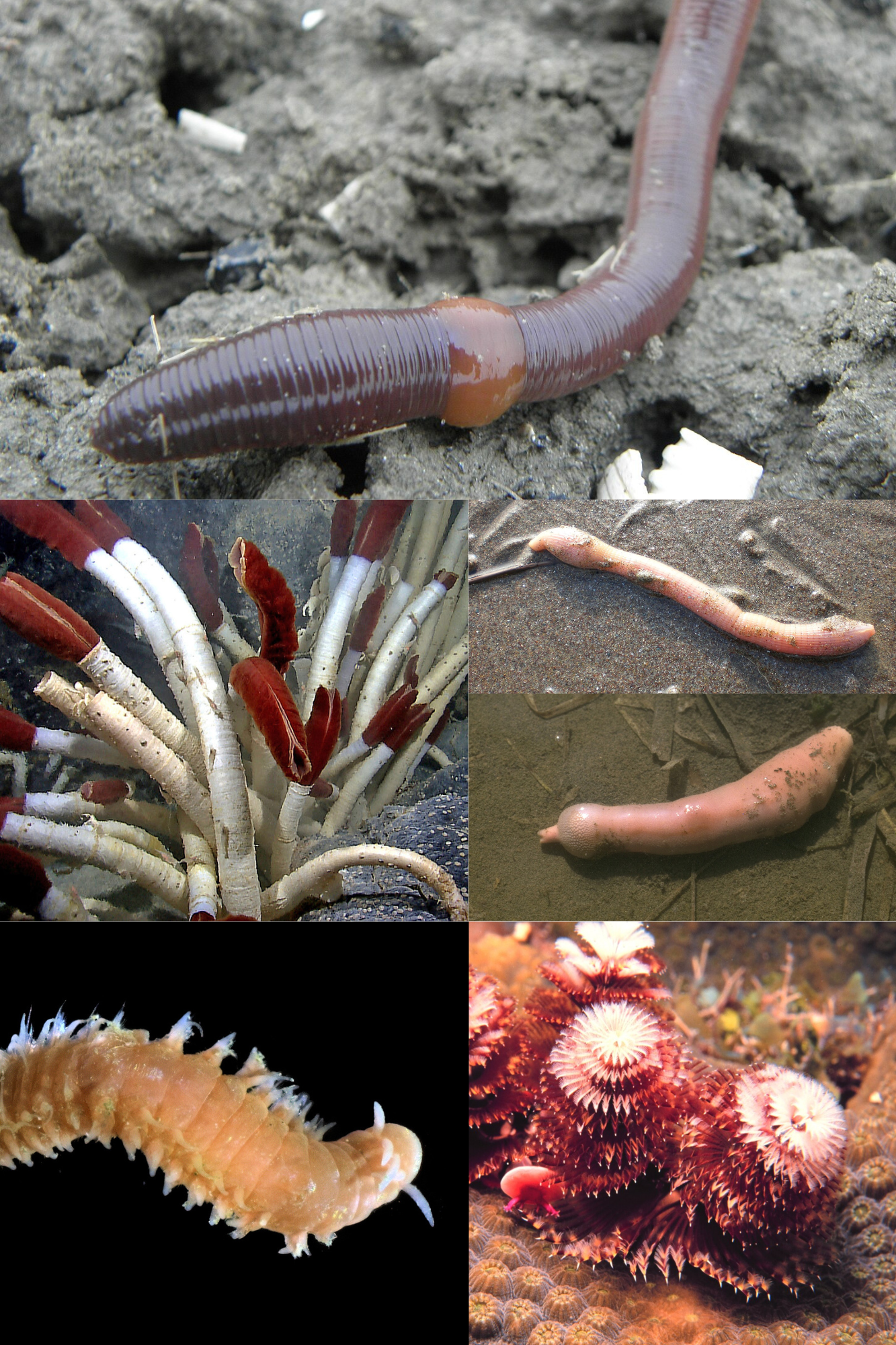
- Annelida and some examples of their diversity.

Scientific classification
- Kingdom: Animalia
- Subkingdom: Eumetazoa
- Clade: ParaHoxozoa
- Clade: Bilateria
- Clade: Nephrozoa
- Clade: Protostomia
- Clade: Spiralia
- Superphylum: Lophotrochozoa
- Phylum: Annelida; Lamarck, 1809

Subdivisions
- Cladistic view: Palaeoannelida; Chaetopteriformia; Amphinomida; Sipunculida; Lobatocerebrum; Pleistoannelida; Myzostomida; Errantia; Sedentaria; Orbiniida; Cirratuliformia; Siboglinidae; Sabellida; Spionida; Capitellida; Terebelliformia; Maldanomorpha; Clitellata; Traditional view: Class "Polychaeta" (paraphyletic); Class Clitellata; "Oligochaeta" (paraphyletic); Branchiobdellida; Hirudinea – leeches; Sipuncula (old phylum); Echiura (old phylum); Pogonophora (old phylum); Class †Machaeridia; incertae sedis: †Sabelliditida; Myzostomida (old phylum)

= Annelid =

Annelida Temporal range: Cambrian Stage 3–recent Possible Ediacaran record, 567 Ma or 555 Ma

Phylum of segmented worms

Annelids (/ˈænəlɪdz/), also known as segmented worms, are animals that comprise the phylum Annelida (/əˈnɛlɪdə/; from Latin anellus 'little ring'). (Note: The term originated from Jean-Baptiste Lamarck's annélides.) The phylum contains over 22,000 extant species, including ragworms, earthworms, and leeches. The species exist in and have adapted to various ecologies – some in marine environments as distinct as tidal zones and hydrothermal vents, others in fresh water, and yet others in moist terrestrial environments.

Annelids are bilaterally symmetrical, triploblastic, coelomate, invertebrate organisms. They also have parapodia for locomotion. Most textbooks still use the traditional division into Polychaetes (almost all marine), Oligochaetes (which include earthworms) and Hirudinea (leech-like species). Cladistic research since 1997 has radically changed this scheme, viewing leeches as a sub-group of oligochaetes and oligochaetes as a sub-group of polychaetes. In addition, the Pogonophora, Echiura and Sipuncula, previously regarded as separate phyla, are now regarded as sub-groups of polychaetes. Annelids are considered members of the Lophotrochozoa, a "super-phylum" of protostomes that also includes molluscs, brachiopods, and nemerteans.

The basic annelid form consists of multiple segments called metameres. Each segment has the same sets of organs and, in most polychaetes, has a pair of parapodia that many species use for locomotion. Septa separate the segments of many species, but are poorly defined or absent in others, and Echiura and Sipuncula show no obvious signs of segmentation. In species with well-developed septa, the blood circulates entirely within blood vessels, and the vessels in segments near the front ends of these species are often built up with muscles that act as hearts. The septa of such species also enable them to change the shapes of individual segments, which facilitates movement by peristalsis ("ripples" that pass along the body) or by undulations that improve the effectiveness of the parapodia. In species with incomplete septa or none, the blood circulates through the main body cavity without any kind of pump, and there is a wide range of locomotory techniques – some burrowing species turn their pharynges inside out to drag themselves through the sediment.

Earthworms are oligochaetes that support terrestrial food chains both as prey and predators, and in some regions are important in aeration and enriching of soil. The burrowing of marine polychaetes, which may constitute up to a third of all species in near-shore environments, encourages the development of ecosystems by enabling water and oxygen to penetrate the sea floor. In addition to improving soil fertility, annelids serve humans as food and as bait. Scientists observe annelids to monitor the quality of marine and fresh water. Although bloodletting is used far less frequently by doctors now than it once was, some leech species are regarded as endangered because they have been over-harvested for this purpose in the last few centuries. Ragworms' jaws are studied by engineers, as they offer an exceptional combination of lightness and strength.

Since annelids are soft-bodied, their fossils are rare – mostly jaws and the mineralized tubes that some of the species secreted. Although some late Ediacaran fossils may represent annelids, the oldest known fossil that is identified with confidence comes from about 518 million years ago in the early Cambrian period. Fossils of most modern mobile polychaete groups appeared by the end of the Carboniferous period, about 299 million years ago. Palaeontologists disagree about whether some body fossils from the mid Ordovician, about 472 to 461 million years ago, are the remains of oligochaetes, and the earliest indisputable fossils of the group appear in the Paleogene period, which began 66 million years ago.

== Etymology ==
Annelid translates to "little ringed ones;" literally, "little ring-shaped." Annel + id = "little ring" + "shape/form". Annelid comes from the French annelés "ringed ones", derived from the Latin annulus "little ring" (itself derived from anus "ring").

== Classification and diversity ==
There are over 22,000 living annelid species, ranging in size from microscopic to the Australian giant Gippsland earthworm and Amynthas mekongianus, which can both grow up to 3 meters (9.8 ft) long to the largest annelid, Microchaetus rappi which can grow up to 6.7 m (22 ft). Although research since 1997 has radically changed scientists' views about the evolutionary family tree of the annelids, most textbooks use the traditional classification into the following sub-groups:

- Polychaetes (about 12,000 species). As their name suggests, they have multiple chetae ("hairs") per segment. Polychaetes have parapodia that function as limbs, and nuchal organs that are thought to be chemosensors. Most are marine animals, although a few species live in fresh water and even fewer on land.
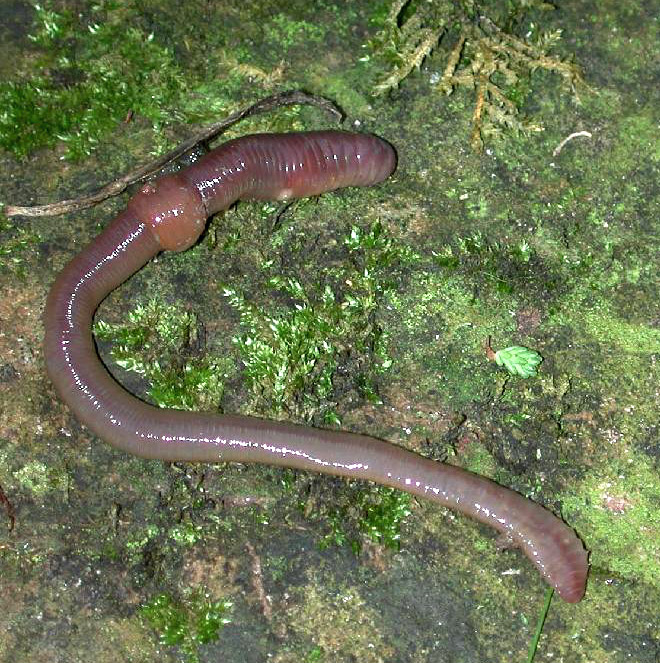
An earthworm's clitellum
- Clitellates (about 10,000 species). These have few or no chetae per segment, and no nuchal organs or parapodia. However, they have a unique reproductive organ, the ring-shaped clitellum ("pack saddle") around their bodies, which produces a cocoon that stores and nourishes fertilized eggs until they hatch or, in moniligastrids, yolky eggs that provide nutrition for the embryos. The clitellates are sub-divided into:
  - Oligochaetes ("with few hairs"), which includes earthworms. Oligochaetes have a sticky pad in the roof of the mouth. Most are burrowers that feed on wholly or partly decomposed organic materials.
  - Hirudinea, whose name means "leech-shaped" and whose best known members are leeches. Marine species are mostly blood-sucking parasites, mainly on fish, while most freshwater species are predators. They have suckers at both ends of their bodies, and use these to move rather like inchworms.
- The Archiannelida, minute annelids that live in the spaces between grains of marine sediment, were treated as a separate class because of their simple body structure, but are now regarded as polychaetes.

Some other groups of animals have been classified in various ways, but are now widely regarded as annelids:

- Pogonophora / Siboglinidae were first discovered in 1914, and their lack of a recognizable gut made it difficult to classify them. They have been classified as a separate phylum, Pogonophora, or as two phyla, Pogonophora and Vestimentifera. More recently they have been re-classified as a family, Siboglinidae, within the polychaetes.
- The Echiura have a checkered taxonomic history: in the 19th century they were assigned to the phylum "Gephyrea", which is now empty as its members have been assigned to other phyla; the Echiura were next regarded as annelids until the 1940s, when they were classified as a phylum in their own right; but a molecular phylogenetics analysis in 1997 concluded that echiurans are annelids.
- Myzostomida live on crinoids and other echinoderms, mainly as parasites. In the past they have been regarded as close relatives of the trematode flatworms or of the tardigrades, but in 1998 it was suggested that they are a sub-group of polychaetes. However, another analysis in 2002 suggested that myzostomids are more closely related to flatworms or to rotifers and acanthocephales.
- Sipuncula was originally classified as annelids, despite the complete lack of segmentation, bristles and other annelid characters. The phylum Sipuncula was later allied with the Mollusca, mostly on the basis of developmental and larval characters. Phylogenetic analyses based on 79 ribosomal proteins indicated a position of Sipuncula within Annelida. Subsequent analysis of the mitochondrion's DNA has confirmed their close relationship to the Myzostomida and Annelida (including echiurans and pogonophorans). It has also been shown that a rudimentary neural segmentation similar to that of annelids occurs in the early larval stage, even if these traits are absent in the adults.

Mitogenomic and phylogenomic analysis also implies that Orthonectida, a group of extremely simplified parasites traditionally placed in Mesozoa, are actually reduced annelids. Research suggest that also nemerteans are annelids, with Oweniidae and Magelonidae as their closest relatives.

== Distinguishing features ==
No single feature distinguishes annelids from other invertebrate phyla, but they have a distinctive combination of features. Their bodies are long, with segments that are divided externally by shallow ring-like constrictions called annuli and internally by septa ("partitions") at the same points, although in some species the septa are incomplete and in a few cases missing. Most of the segments contain the same sets of organs, although sharing a common gut, circulatory system and nervous system makes them inter-dependent. Under the naked skin, well-developed muscles can be found. They have a closed circuit vascular system with loose hemoglobine where the blood makes its entire circuit via blood vessels. Their bodies are covered by a cuticle (outer covering) that does not contain cells but is secreted by cells in the skin underneath, is made of tough but flexible collagen and does not molt – on the other hand arthropods' cuticles are made of the more rigid α-chitin, and molt until the arthropods reach their full size.

Summary of distinguishing features
	Annelida	Recently merged into Annelida		Closely related	Similar-looking phyla	
	Annelida	Echiura	Sipuncula	Nemertea	Arthropoda	Onychophora
External segmentation	Yes	No		Only in a few species	Yes, except in mites	No
Repetition of internal organs	Yes	No		Yes	In primitive forms	Yes
Septa between segments	In most species	No				
Cuticle material	Collagen			None	α-chitin	
Molting	Generally no; but some polychaetes molt their jaws, and leeches molt their skins	No			Yes	
Body cavity	Coelom; but this is reduced or missing in many leeches and some small polychaetes	Two coelomata, main and in proboscis	Two coelomata, main and in tentacles	Coelom only in proboscis	Hemocoel	
Circulatory system	Closed in most species	Open outflow, return via branched vein	Open	Closed	Open	

== Description ==
=== Segmentation ===
Diagram of segments of an annelid

In addition to Sipuncula and Echiura, also lineages like Lobatocerebrum, Diurodrilus and Polygordius have lost their segmentation, but these are the exceptions from the rule. Most of an annelid's body consists of segments that are practically identical, having the same sets of internal organs and external chaetae (Greek χαιτη, meaning "hair") and, in some species, appendages. The frontmost and rearmost sections are not regarded as true segments as they do not contain the standard sets of organs and do not develop in the same way as the true segments. The frontmost section, called the prostomium (Greek προ- meaning "in front of" and στομα meaning "mouth") contains the brain and sense organs, while the rearmost, called the pygidium (Greek πυγιδιον, meaning "little tail") or periproct contains the anus, generally on the underside. The first section behind the prostomium, called the peristomium (Greek περι- meaning "around" and στομα meaning "mouth"), is regarded by some zoologists as not a true segment, but in some polychaetes the peristomium has chetae and appendages like those of other segments.

The segments develop one at a time from a growth zone just ahead of the pygidium, so that an annelid's youngest segment is just in front of the growth zone while the peristomium is the oldest. This pattern is called teloblastic growth. Some groups of annelids, including all leeches, have fixed maximum numbers of segments, while others add segments throughout their lives.

The phylum's name is derived from the Latin word annelus, meaning "little ring".

=== Body wall, chaetae and parapodia ===
Internal anatomy of a segment of an annelid

Annelids' cuticles are made of collagen fibers, usually in layers that spiral in alternating directions so that the fibers cross each other. These are secreted by the one-cell deep epidermis (outermost skin layer). A few marine annelids that live in tubes lack cuticles, but their tubes have a similar structure, and mucus-secreting glands in the epidermis protect their skins. Under the epidermis is the dermis, which is made of connective tissue, in other words a combination of cells and non-cellular materials such as collagen. Below this are two layers of muscles, which develop from the lining of the coelom (body cavity): circular muscles make a segment longer and slimmer when they contract, while under them are longitudinal muscles, usually four distinct strips, whose contractions make the segment shorter and fatter. But several families have lost the circular muscles, and it has been suggested that the lack of circular muscles is a plesiomorphic character in Annelida. Some annelids also have oblique internal muscles that connect the underside of the body to each side.

The setae ("hairs") of annelids project out from the epidermis to provide traction and other capabilities. The simplest are unjointed and form paired bundles near the top and bottom of each side of each segment. The parapodia ("limbs") of annelids that have them often bear more complex chetae at their tips – for example jointed, comb-like or hooked. Chetae are made of moderately flexible β-chitin and are formed by follicles, each of which has a chetoblast ("hair-forming") cell at the bottom and muscles that can extend or retract the cheta. The chetoblasts produce chetae by forming microvilli, fine hair-like extensions that increase the area available for secreting the cheta. When the cheta is complete, the microvilli withdraw into the chetoblast, leaving parallel tunnels that run almost the full length of the cheta. Hence annelids' chetae are structurally different from the setae ("bristles") of arthropods, which are made of the more rigid α-chitin, have a single internal cavity, and are mounted on flexible joints in shallow pits in the cuticle.

Nearly all polychaetes have parapodia that function as limbs, while other major annelid groups lack them. Parapodia are unjointed paired extensions of the body wall, and their muscles are derived from the circular muscles of the body. They are often supported internally by one or more large, thick chetae. The parapodia of burrowing and tube-dwelling polychaetes are often just ridges whose tips bear hooked chetae. In active crawlers and swimmers the parapodia are often divided into large upper and lower paddles on a very short trunk, and the paddles are generally fringed with chetae and sometimes with cirri (fused bundles of cilia) and gills.

=== Nervous system and senses ===
The brain generally forms a ring round the pharynx (throat), consisting of a pair of ganglia (local control centers) above and in front of the pharynx, linked by double ventral nerve cords either side of the pharynx to another pair of ganglia just below and behind it. The brains of polychaetes are generally in the prostomium, while those of clitellates are in the peristomium or sometimes the first segment behind the prostomium. In some very mobile and active polychaetes the brain is enlarged and more complex, with visible hindbrain, midbrain and forebrain sections. The rest of the central nervous system, the ventral nerve cord, is generally "ladder-like", consisting of a pair of nerve cords that run through the bottom part of the body and have in each segment paired ganglia linked by a transverse connection. From each segmental ganglion a branching system of local nerves runs into the body wall and then encircles the body. However, in most polychaetes the two main nerve cords are fused, and in the tube-dwelling genus Owenia the single nerve chord has no ganglia and is located in the epidermis.

As in arthropods, each muscle fiber (cell) is controlled by more than one neuron, and the speed and power of the fiber's contractions depends on the combined effects of all its neurons. Vertebrates have a different system, in which one neuron controls a group of muscle fibers. Most annelids' longitudinal nerve trunks include giant axons (the output signal lines of nerve cells). Their large diameter decreases their resistance, which allows them to transmit signals exceptionally fast. This enables these worms to withdraw rapidly from danger by shortening their bodies. Experiments have shown that cutting the giant axons prevents this escape response but does not affect normal movement.

The sensors are primarily single cells that detect light, chemicals, pressure waves and contact, and are present on the head, appendages (if any) and other parts of the body. Nuchal ("on the neck") organs are paired, ciliated structures found only in polychaetes, and are thought to be chemosensors. Some polychaetes also have various combinations of ocelli ("little eyes") that detect the direction from which light is coming and camera eyes or compound eyes that can probably form images. The compound eyes probably evolved independently of arthropods' eyes. Some tube-worms use ocelli widely spread over their bodies to detect the shadows of fish, so that they can quickly withdraw into their tubes. Some burrowing and tube-dwelling polychaetes have statocysts (tilt and balance sensors) that indicate which way is down. A few polychaete genera have on the undersides of their heads palps that are used both in feeding and as "feelers", and some of these also have antennae that are structurally similar but probably are used mainly as "feelers".

=== Coelom, locomotion and circulatory system ===
Most annelids have a pair of coelomata (body cavities) in each segment, separated from other segments by septa and from each other by vertical mesenteries. Each septum forms a sandwich with connective tissue in the middle and mesothelium (membrane that serves as a lining) from the preceding and following segments on either side. Each mesentery is similar except that the mesothelium is the lining of each of the pair of coelomata, and the blood vessels and, in polychaetes, the main nerve cords are embedded in it. The mesothelium is made of modified epitheliomuscular cells; in other words, their bodies form part of the epithelium but their bases extend to form muscle fibers in the body wall. The mesothelium may also form radial and circular muscles on the septa, and circular muscles around the blood vessels and gut. Parts of the mesothelium, especially on the outside of the gut, may also form chloragogen cells that perform similar functions to the livers of vertebrates: producing and storing glycogen and fat; producing the oxygen-carrier hemoglobin; breaking down proteins; and turning nitrogenous waste products into ammonia and urea to be excreted.

Peristalsis moves this "worm" to the right

Many annelids move by peristalsis (waves of contraction and expansion that sweep along the body), or flex the body while using parapodia to crawl or swim. In these animals the septa enable the circular and longitudinal muscles to change the shape of individual segments, by making each segment a separate fluid-filled "balloon". However, the septa are often incomplete in annelids that are semi-sessile or that do not move by peristalsis or by movements of parapodia – for example some move by whipping movements of the body, some small marine species move by means of cilia (fine muscle-powered hairs) and some burrowers turn their pharynges (throats) inside out to penetrate the sea-floor and drag themselves into it.

The fluid in the coelomata contains coelomocyte cells that defend the animals against parasites and infections. In some species coelomocytes may also contain a respiratory pigment – red hemoglobin in some species, green chlorocruorin in others (dissolved in the plasma) – and provide oxygen transport within their segments. Respiratory pigment is also dissolved in the blood plasma. Species with well-developed septa generally also have blood vessels running all long their bodies above and below the gut, the upper one carrying blood forwards while the lower one carries it backwards. Networks of capillaries in the body wall and around the gut transfer blood between the main blood vessels and to parts of the segment that need oxygen and nutrients. Both of the major vessels, especially the upper one, can pump blood by contracting. In some annelids the forward end of the upper blood vessel is enlarged with muscles to form a heart, while in the forward ends of many earthworms some of the vessels that connect the upper and lower main vessels function as hearts. Species with poorly developed or no septa generally have no blood vessels and rely on the circulation within the coelom for delivering nutrients and oxygen.

However, leeches and their closest relatives have a body structure that is very uniform within the group but significantly different from that of other annelids, including other members of the Clitellata. In leeches there are no septa, the connective tissue layer of the body wall is so thick that it occupies much of the body, and the two coelomata are widely separated and run the length of the body. They function as the main blood vessels, although they are side-by-side rather than upper and lower. However, they are lined with mesothelium, like the coelomata and unlike the blood vessels of other annelids. Leeches generally use suckers at their front and rear ends to move like inchworms. The anus is on the upper surface of the pygidium.

=== Respiration ===
In some annelids, including earthworms, all respiration is via the skin. However, many polychaetes and some clitellates (the group to which earthworms belong) have gills associated with most segments, often as extensions of the parapodia in polychaetes. The gills of tube-dwellers and burrowers usually cluster around whichever end has the stronger water flow.

=== Feeding and excretion ===
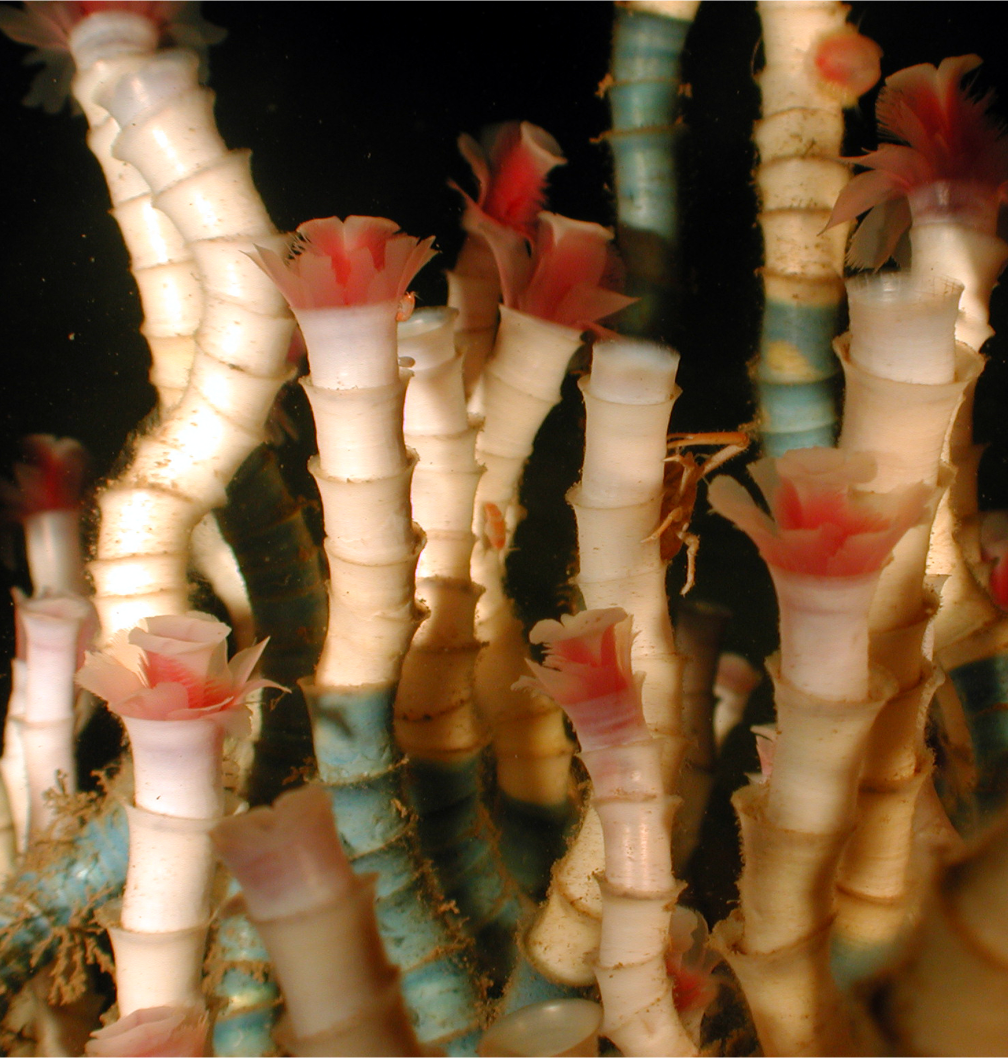
Lamellibrachian tube worms have no gut and gain nutrients from chemoautotrophic bacteria living inside them.

Feeding structures in the mouth region vary widely, and have little correlation with the animals' diets. Many polychaetes have a muscular pharynx that can be everted (turned inside out to extend it). In these animals the foremost few segments often lack septa so that, when the muscles in these segments contract, the sharp increase in fluid pressure from all these segments everts the pharynx very quickly. Two families, the Eunicidae and Phyllodocidae, have evolved jaws, which can be used for seizing prey, biting off pieces of vegetation, or grasping dead and decaying matter. On the other hand, some predatory polychaetes have neither jaws nor eversible pharynges. Selective deposit feeders generally live in tubes on the sea-floor and use palps to find food particles in the sediment and then wipe them into their mouths. Filter feeders use "crowns" of palps covered in cilia that wash food particles towards their mouths. Non-selective deposit feeders ingest soil or marine sediments via mouths that are generally unspecialized. Some clitellates have sticky pads in the roofs of their mouths, and some of these can evert the pads to capture prey. Leeches often have an eversible proboscis, or a muscular pharynx with two or three teeth.

The gut is generally an almost straight tube supported by the mesenteries (vertical partitions within segments), and ends with the anus on the underside of the pygidium. However, in members of the tube-dwelling family Siboglinidae the gut is blocked by a swollen lining that houses symbiotic bacteria, which can make up 15% of the worms' total weight. The bacteria convert inorganic matter – such as hydrogen sulfide and carbon dioxide from hydrothermal vents, or methane from seeps – to organic matter that feeds themselves and their hosts, while the worms extend their palps into the gas flows to absorb the gases needed by the bacteria.

Annelids with blood vessels use metanephridia to remove soluble waste products, while those without use protonephridia. Both of these systems use a two-stage filtration process, in which fluid and waste products are first extracted and these are filtered again to re-absorb any re-usable materials while dumping toxic and spent materials as urine. The difference is that protonephridia combine both filtration stages in the same organ, while metanephridia perform only the second filtration and rely on other mechanisms for the first – in annelids special filter cells in the walls of the blood vessels let fluids and other small molecules pass into the coelomic fluid, where it circulates to the metanephridia. In annelids the points at which fluid enters the protonephridia or metanephridia are on the forward side of a septum while the second-stage filter and the nephridiopore (exit opening in the body wall) are in the following segment. As a result, the hindmost segment (before the growth zone and pygidium) has no structure that extracts its wastes, as there is no following segment to filter and discharge them, while the first segment contains an extraction structure that passes wastes to the second, but does not contain the structures that re-filter and discharge urine.

=== Reproduction and life cycle ===
==== Asexual reproduction ====
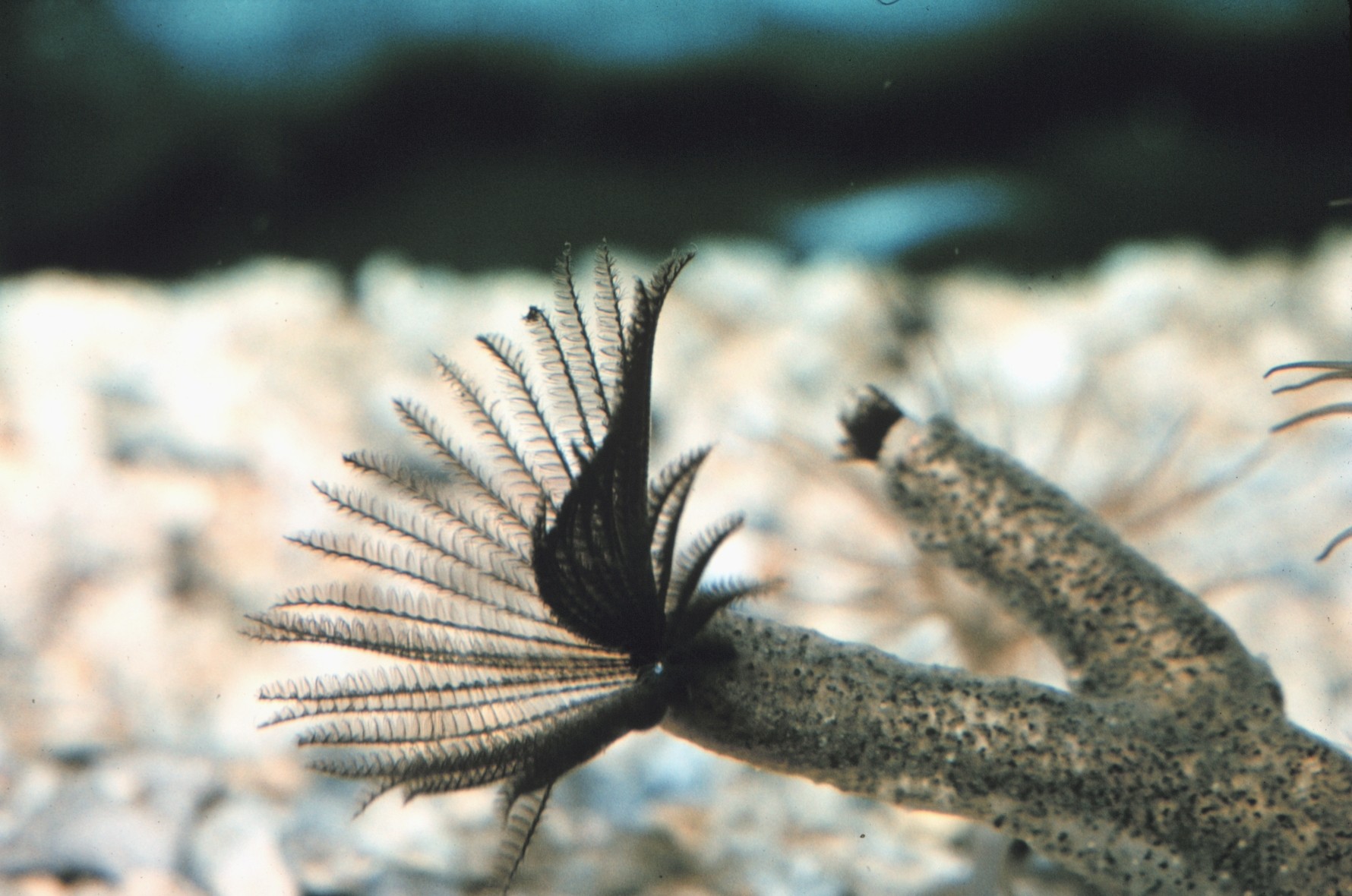
This sabellid tubeworm is budding

Polychaetes can reproduce asexually, by dividing into two or more pieces or by budding off a new individual while the parent remains a complete organism. Some oligochaetes, such as Aulophorus furcatus, seem to reproduce entirely asexually, while others reproduce asexually in summer and sexually in autumn. Asexual reproduction in oligochaetes is always by dividing into two or more pieces, rather than by budding. However, leeches have never been seen reproducing asexually.

Most polychaetes and oligochaetes also use similar mechanisms to regenerate after suffering damage. Two polychaete genera, Chaetopterus and Dodecaceria, can regenerate from a single segment, and others can regenerate even if their heads are removed. Annelids are the most complex animals that can regenerate after such severe damage. On the other hand, leeches cannot regenerate.

==== Sexual reproduction ====
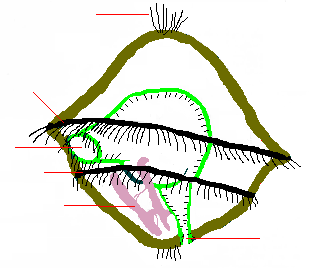
Trochophore larva

It is thought that annelids were originally animals with two separate sexes, which released ova and sperm into the water via their nephridia. The fertilized eggs develop into trochophore larvae, which live as plankton. Later they sink to the sea-floor and metamorphose into miniature adults: the part of the trochophore between the apical tuft and the prototroch becomes the prostomium (head); a small area round the trochophore's anus becomes the pygidium (tail-piece); a narrow band immediately in front of that becomes the growth zone that produces new segments; and the rest of the trochophore becomes the peristomium (the segment that contains the mouth).

However, the lifecycles of most living polychaetes, which are almost all marine animals, are unknown, and only about 25% of the 300+ species whose lifecycles are known follow this pattern. About 14% use a similar external fertilization but produce yolk-rich eggs, which reduce the time the larva needs to spend among the plankton, or eggs from which miniature adults emerge rather than larvae. The rest care for the fertilized eggs until they hatch – some by producing jelly-covered masses of eggs which they tend, some by attaching the eggs to their bodies and a few species by keeping the eggs within their bodies until they hatch. These species use a variety of methods for sperm transfer; for example, in some the females collect sperm released into the water, while in others the males have a penis that inject sperm into the female. There is no guarantee that this is a representative sample of polychaetes' reproductive patterns, and it simply reflects scientists' current knowledge.

Some polychaetes breed only once in their lives, while others breed almost continuously or through several breeding seasons. While most polychaetes remain of one sex all their lives, a significant percentage of species are full hermaphrodites or change sex during their lives. Most polychaetes whose reproduction has been studied lack permanent gonads, and it is uncertain how they produce ova and sperm. In a few species the rear of the body splits off and becomes a separate individual that lives just long enough to swim to a suitable environment, usually near the surface, and spawn.

Most mature clitellates (the group that includes earthworms and leeches) are full hermaphrodites, although in a few leech species younger adults function as males and become female at maturity. All have well-developed gonads, and all copulate. Earthworms store their partners' sperm in spermathecae ("sperm stores") and then the clitellum produces a cocoon that collects ova from the ovaries and then sperm from the spermathecae. Fertilization and development of earthworm eggs takes place in the cocoon. Leeches' eggs are fertilized in the ovaries, and then transferred to the cocoon. In all clitellates the cocoon also either produces yolk when the eggs are fertilized or nutrients while they are developing. All clitellates hatch as miniature adults rather than larvae.

== Ecological significance ==
Charles Darwin's book The Formation of Vegetable Mould Through the Action of Worms (1881) presented the first scientific analysis of earthworms' contributions to soil fertility. Some burrow while others live entirely on the surface, generally in moist leaf litter. The burrowers loosen the soil so that oxygen and water can penetrate it, and both surface and burrowing worms help to produce soil by mixing organic and mineral matter, by accelerating the decomposition of organic matter and thus making it more quickly available to other organisms, and by concentrating minerals and converting them to forms that plants can use more easily. Earthworms are also important prey for birds ranging in size from robins to storks, and for mammals ranging from shrews to badgers, and in some cases conserving earthworms may be essential for conserving endangered birds.

Terrestrial annelids can be invasive in some situations. In the glaciated areas of North America, for example, almost all native earthworms are thought to have been killed by the glaciers and the worms currently found in those areas are all introduced from other areas, primarily from Europe, and, more recently, from Asia. Northern hardwood forests are especially negatively impacted by invasive worms through the loss of leaf duff, soil fertility, changes in soil chemistry and the loss of ecological diversity. Especially of concern is Amynthas agrestis and at least one state (Wisconsin) has listed it as a prohibited species.

Earthworms migrate only a limited distance annually on their own, and the spread of invasive worms is increased rapidly by anglers and from worms or their cocoons in the dirt on vehicle tires or footwear.

Marine annelids may account for over one-third of bottom-dwelling animal species around coral reefs and in tidal zones. Burrowing species increase the penetration of water and oxygen into the sea-floor sediment, which encourages the growth of populations of aerobic bacteria and small animals alongside their burrows.

Although blood-sucking leeches do little direct harm to their victims, some transmit flagellates that can be very dangerous to their hosts. Some small tube-dwelling oligochaetes transmit myxosporean parasites that cause whirling disease in fish.

== Interaction with humans ==
Earthworms make a significant contribution to soil fertility. The rear end of the Palolo worm, a marine polychaete that tunnels through coral, detaches in order to spawn at the surface, and the people of Samoa regard these spawning modules as a delicacy. Anglers sometimes find that worms are more effective bait than artificial flies, and worms can be kept for several days in a tin lined with damp moss. Ragworms are commercially important as bait and as food sources for aquaculture, and there have been proposals to farm them in order to reduce over-fishing of their natural populations. Some marine polychaetes' predation on molluscs causes serious losses to fishery and aquaculture operations.

Scientists study aquatic annelids to monitor the oxygen content, salinity and pollution levels in fresh and marine water.

Accounts of the use of leeches for the medically dubious practice of blood-letting have come from China around 30 AD, India around 200 AD, ancient Rome around 50 AD and later throughout Europe. In the 19th century medical demand for leeches was so high that some areas' stocks were exhausted and other regions imposed restrictions or bans on exports, and Hirudo medicinalis is treated as an endangered species by both IUCN and CITES. More recently leeches have been used to assist in microsurgery, and their saliva has provided anti-inflammatory compounds and several important anticoagulants, one of which also prevents tumors from spreading.. One particularly important microsurgical application is when fingers, toes, or ears are cut off, in which arteries can easily be mended but not veins; the leeches can help control this congestion until the veins can grow back into the appendage to be healed.

Ragworms' jaws are strong but much lighter than the hard parts of many other organisms, which are biomineralized with calcium salts. These advantages have attracted the attention of engineers. Investigations showed that ragworm jaws are made of unusual proteins that bind strongly to zinc.

== Evolutionary history ==
=== Fossil record ===
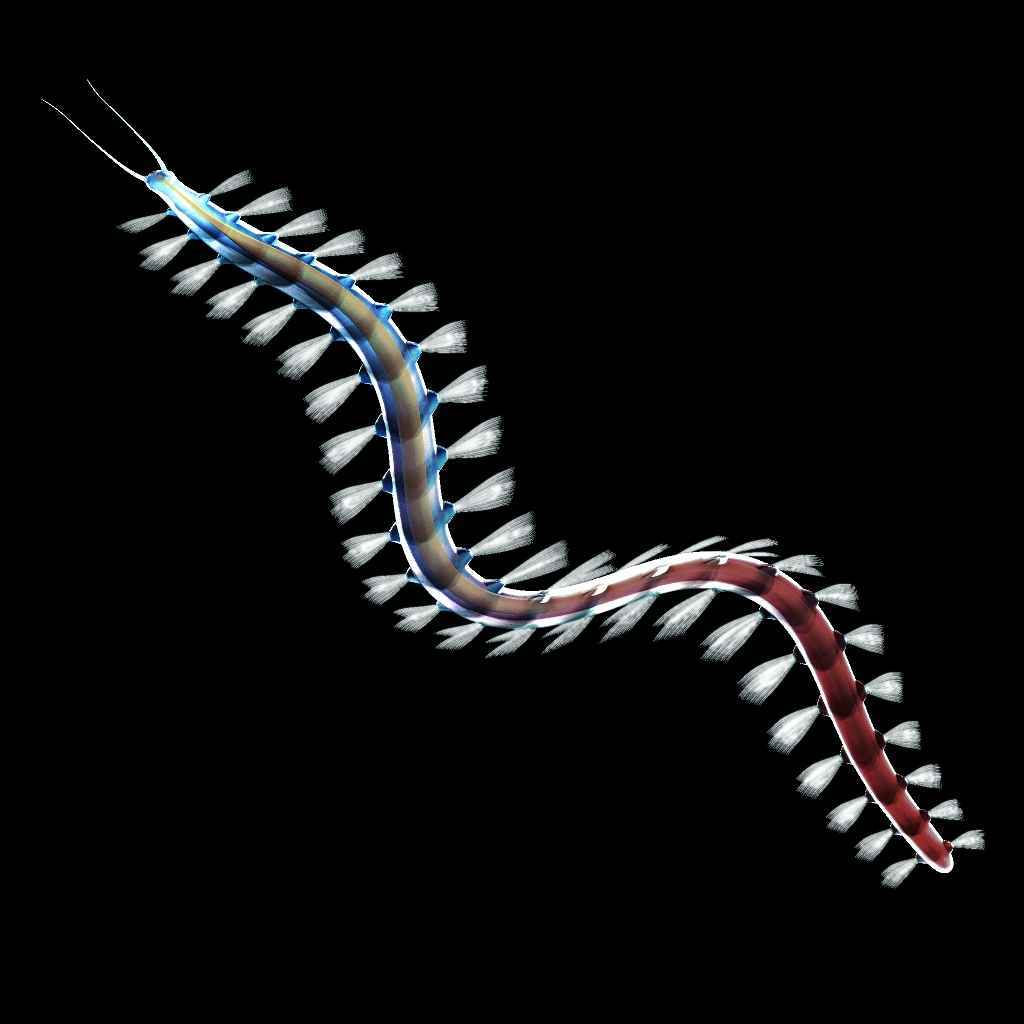
Burgessochaeta setigera

Since annelids are soft-bodied, their fossils are rare. Polychaetes' fossil record consists mainly of the jaws that some species had and the mineralized tubes that some secreted. Some Ediacaran fossils such as Dickinsonia in some ways resemble polychaetes, but the similarities are too vague for these fossils to be classified with confidence. The small shelly fossil Cloudina, from 549 to 542 million years ago, has been classified by some authors as an annelid, but by others as a cnidarian (i.e. in the phylum to which jellyfish and sea anemones belong). Until 2008 the earliest fossils widely accepted as annelids were the polychaetes Canadia and Burgessochaeta, both from Canada's Burgess Shale, formed about 505 million years ago in the Middle Cambrian. Myoscolex, found in Australia and a little older than the Burgess Shale, was possibly an annelid. However, it lacks some typical annelid features and has features which are not usually found in annelids and some of which are associated with other phyla. Then Simon Conway Morris and John Peel reported Phragmochaeta from Sirius Passet, about 518 million years old, and concluded that it was the oldest annelid known to date. There has been vigorous debate about whether the Burgess Shale fossil Wiwaxia was a mollusc or an annelid. Polychaetes diversified in the early Ordovician, about 488 to 474 million years ago. It is not until the early Ordovician that the first annelid jaws are found, thus the crown-group cannot have appeared before this date and probably appeared somewhat later. By the end of the Carboniferous, about 299 million years ago, fossils of most of the modern mobile polychaete groups had appeared. Many fossil tubes look like those made by modern sessile polychaetes, but the first tubes clearly produced by polychaetes date from the Jurassic, less than 199 million years ago. In 2012, a 508 million year old species of annelid found near the Burgess Shale beds in British Columbia, Kootenayscolex, was found that changed the hypotheses about how the annelid head developed. It appears to have bristles on its head segment akin to those along its body, as if the head simply developed as a specialized version of a previously generic segment. An even earlier fossil, Wenghuiia, was discovered in 2010 from the Ediacaran Doushantuo Formation around 555 Ma, and as this genus resembles relatively derived annelids this suggests their origins are even further back.

The earliest good evidence for oligochaetes occurs in the Tertiary period, which began 65 million years ago, and it has been suggested that these animals evolved around the same time as flowering plants in the early Cretaceous, from 130 to 90 million years ago. A trace fossil consisting of a convoluted burrow partly filled with small fecal pellets may be evidence that earthworms were present in the early Triassic period from 251 to 245 million years ago. Body fossils going back to the mid Ordovician, from 472 to 461 million years ago, have been tentatively classified as oligochaetes, but these identifications are uncertain and some have been disputed.

=== Internal relationships ===
Traditionally the annelids have been divided into two major groups, the polychaetes and clitellates. In turn the clitellates were divided into oligochaetes, which include earthworms, and hirudinomorphs, whose best-known members are leeches. For many years there was no clear arrangement of the approximately 80 polychaete families into higher-level groups. In 1997 Greg Rouse and Kristian Fauchald attempted a "first heuristic step in terms of bringing polychaete systematics to an acceptable level of rigour", based on anatomical structures, and divided polychaetes into:

- - Echiura
  - Articulata
    - - Euarthropoda
      - Onychophora
    - Annelida
      - Palpata
        - Canalipalpata
          - Sabellida
          - Terebellida
          - Spionida
        - Aciculata
          - Phyllodocida
          - Eunicida
      - Scolecida
- Sipuncula

Morphological phylogeny of Annelida (1997)

- Scolecida, less than 1,000 burrowing species that look rather like earthworms.
- Palpata, the great majority of polychaetes, divided into:
  - Canalipalpata, which are distinguished by having long grooved palps that they use for feeding, and most of which live in tubes.
  - Aciculata, the most active polychaetes, which have parapodia reinforced by internal spines (aciculae).

- Annelida
  - - - some "Scolecida" and "Aciculata"
      - - - - some "Canalipalpata"
            - Sipuncula, previously a separate phylum
          - - Clitellata
              - - some "Oligochaeta"
                - - Hirudinea (leeches)
                  - some "Oligochaeta"
              - some "Oligochaeta"
            - Aeolosomatidae
        - some "Scolecida" and "Canalipalpata"
        - - - some "Scolecida"
            - Echiura, previously a separate phylum
          - some "Scolecida"
    - - some "Canalipalpata"
      - - Siboglinidae, previously phylum Pogonophora
        - some "Canalipalpata"
  - some "Scolecida", "Canalipalpata" and "Aciculata"

Annelid groups and phyla incorporated into Annelida (2007; simplified).
Highlights major changes to traditional classifications.

Also in 1997 Damhnait McHugh, using molecular phylogenetics to compare similarities and differences in one gene, presented a very different view, in which: the clitellates were an offshoot of one branch of the polychaete family tree; the pogonophorans and echiurans, which for a few decades had been regarded as a separate phyla, were placed on other branches of the polychaete tree. Subsequent molecular phylogenetics analyses on a similar scale presented similar conclusions.

In 2007 Torsten Struck and colleagues compared three genes in 81 taxa, of which nine were outgroups, in other words not considered closely related to annelids but included to give an indication of where the organisms under study are placed on the larger tree of life. For a cross-check the study used an analysis of 11 genes (including the original 3) in ten taxa. This analysis agreed that clitellates, pogonophorans and echiurans were on various branches of the polychaete family tree. It also concluded that the classification of polychaetes into Scolecida, Canalipalpata and Aciculata was useless, as the members of these alleged groups were scattered all over the family tree derived from comparing the 81 taxa. It also placed sipunculans, generally regarded at the time as a separate phylum, on another branch of the polychaete tree, and concluded that leeches were a sub-group of oligochaetes rather than their sister-group among the clitellates. Rouse accepted the analyses based on molecular phylogenetics, and their main conclusions are now the scientific consensus, although the details of the annelid family tree remain uncertain.

In addition to re-writing the classification of annelids and three previously independent phyla, the molecular phylogenetics analyses undermine the emphasis that decades of previous writings placed on the importance of segmentation in the classification of invertebrates. Polychaetes, which these analyses found to be the parent group, have completely segmented bodies, while polychaetes' echiurans and sipunculan offshoots are not segmented and pogonophores are segmented only in the rear parts of their bodies. It now seems that segmentation can appear and disappear much more easily in the course of evolution than was previously thought. The 2007 study also noted that the ladder-like nervous system, which is associated with segmentation, is less universal than previously thought in both annelids and arthropods. (Note: Since this section was written, a new paper has revised the 2007 results: Struck, T. H.; Paul, C.; Hill, N.; Hartmann, S.; Hösel, C.; Kube, M.; Lieb, B.; Meyer, A.; Tiedemann, R.; Purschke, G. N.; Bleidorn, C. (2011). "Phylogenomic analyses unravel annelid evolution". Nature. 471 (7336): 95–98. Bibcode:2011Natur.471...95S. doi:10.1038/nature09864. PMID 21368831. S2CID 4428998.)

The updated phylogenetic tree of the annelid phylum is comprised by a grade of basal groups of polychaetes: Palaeoannelida, Chaetopteriformia and the Amphinomida/Sipuncula/Lobatocerebrum clade. This grade is followed by Pleistoannelida, the clade containing nearly all of annelid diversity, divided into two highly diverse groups: Sedentaria and Errantia. Sedentaria contains the clitellates, pogonophorans, echiurans and some archiannelids, as well as several polychaete groups. Errantia contains the eunicid and phyllodocid polychaetes, and several archiannelids. Some small groups, such as the Myzostomida, are more difficult to place due to long branching, but belong to either one of these large groups.

- Annelida
  - - Palaeoannelida
      - Oweniidae
      - Magelonidae
  - - - Chaetopteriformia
        - Apistobranchus
        - - Psammodrilidae
          - Chaetopteridae
    - - - Amphinomida
        - - Lobatocerebrum
          - Sipuncula
      - - Pleistoannelida
          - Errantia
            - Aciculata
              - Eunicida
              - Phyllodocida
            - Protodriliformia
              - Polygordiidae
              - Protodrilida
          - ?
            Myzostomida
          - Sedentaria
            - Orbiniida
            - - - - Cirratuliformia
                  - Siboglinidae (pogonophorans)
                - - Sabellida
                  - Spionida
              - - - Opheliida
                  - Capitellida
                    - Capitellidae
                    - Echiura
                - - - Terebelliformia
                    - Maldanomorpha
                  - Clitellata (oligochaetes, leeches...)

=== External relationships ===
Annelids are members of the protostomes, one of the two major superphyla of bilaterian animals – the other is the deuterostomes, which includes vertebrates. Within the protostomes, annelids used to be grouped with arthropods under the super-group Articulata ("jointed animals"), as segmentation is obvious in most members of both phyla. However, the genes that drive segmentation in arthropods do not appear to do the same in annelids. Arthropods and annelids both have close relatives that are unsegmented. It is at least as easy to assume that they evolved segmented bodies independently as it is to assume that the ancestral protostome or bilaterian was segmented and that segmentation disappeared in many descendant phyla. The current view is that annelids are grouped with molluscs, brachiopods and several other phyla that have lophophores (fan-like feeding structures) and/or trochophore larvae as members of Lophotrochozoa. Meanwhile, arthropods are now regarded as members of the Ecdysozoa ("animals that molt"), along with some phyla that are unsegmented.

- Bilateria
  - Acoelomorpha (Acoela and Nemertodermatida)
  - - Deuterostomia (Ambulacrarians and chordates)
    - Protostomia
      - Ecdysozoa (Arthropods, etc.)
      - Spiralia
        - Gnathifera
        - Platytrochozoa
          - - Rouphozoa
            - Mesozoa
          - Lophotrochozoa
            - Cycliophora
            - Annelida
            - - Mollusca
              - Kryptotrochozoa
                - Lophophorata
                  - Brachiozoa
                    - Brachiopoda
                    - Phoronida
                  - Bryozoa s.l.
                    - Entoprocta
                    - Ectoprocta
                - Nemertea

The "Lophotrochozoa" hypothesis is also supported by the fact that many phyla within this group, including annelids, molluscs, nemerteans and flatworms, follow a similar pattern in the fertilized egg's development. When their cells divide after the 4-cell stage, descendants of these four cells form a spiral pattern. In these phyla the "fates" of the embryo's cells, in other words the roles their descendants will play in the adult animal, are the same and can be predicted from a very early stage. Hence this development pattern is often described as "spiral determinate cleavage".

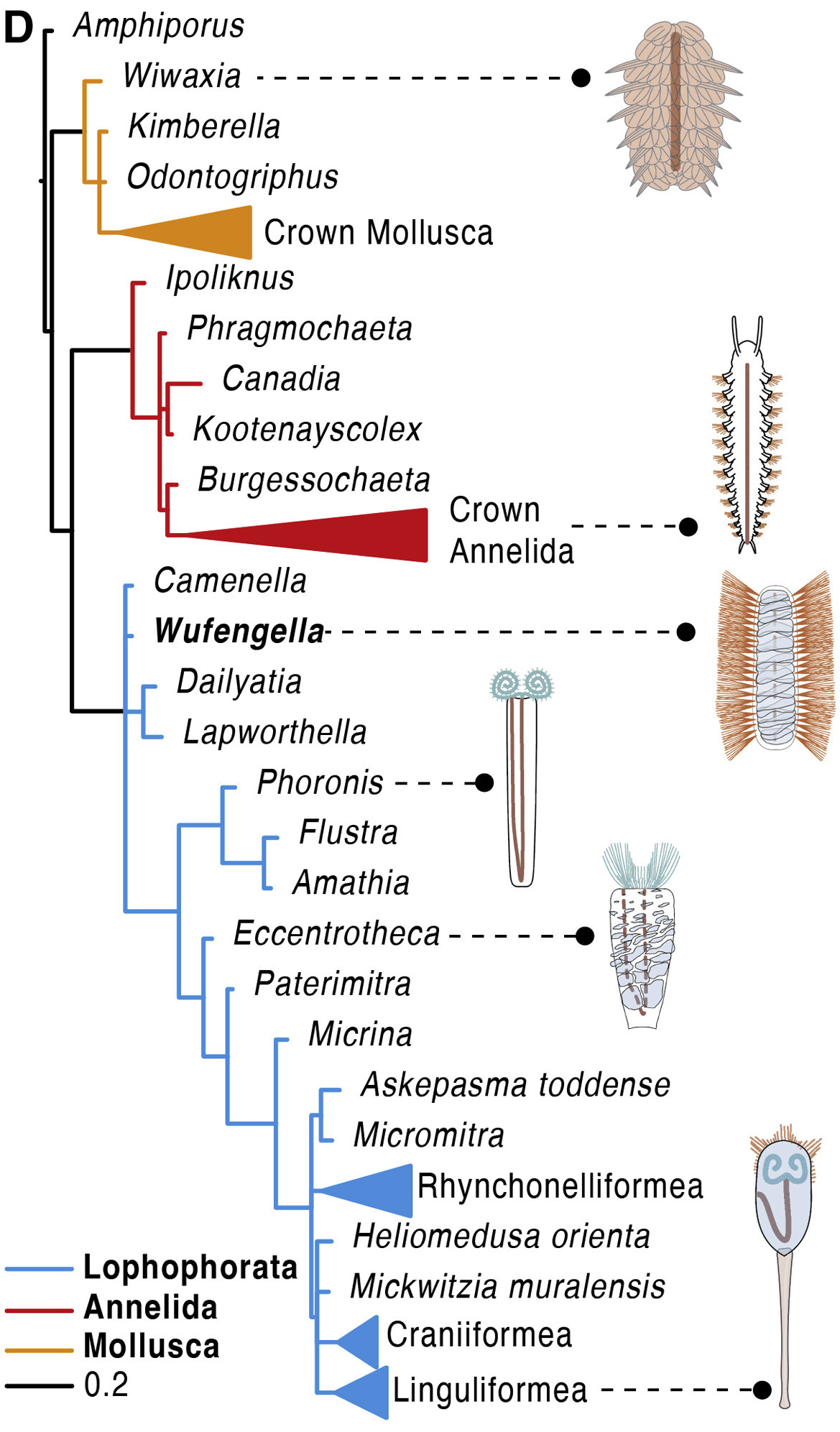
Phylogenetic tree of early lophophorates

Fossil discoveries lead to the hypothesis that Annelida and the lophophorates are more closely related to each other than any other phyla. Because of the body plan of lophotrochozoan fossils, a phylogenetic analysis found the lophophorates as the sister group of annelids. Both groups share in common: the presence of chaetae secreted by microvilli; paired, metameric coelomic compartments; and a similar metanephridial structure.

- Lophotrochozoa
  - Nemertea
  - - - †Wiwaxia
      - - †Kimberella
        - Mollusca
    - - - †Phragmochaeta
        - Annelida
      - Lophophorata
        - †Wufengella
        - - - Phoronida
            - Bryozoa
          - †"Tommotiids"
          - Brachiopoda
