= Transmembrane protein 151A =

Protein found in humans

TMEM151A

Identifiers
- Aliases: TMEM151A, TMEM151, Transmembrane protein 151a
- External IDs: MGI: 2147713; GeneCards: TMEM151A

Gene location (Human)
Chr.	Chromosome 11 (human)
Band	11q13.2	Start	66,291,894 bp
Band	11q13.2	End	66,296,664 bp

Gene location (Mouse)
Chr.	Chromosome 19 (mouse)
Band	19|19 A	Start	5,070,859 bp
Band	19|19 A	End	5,085,531 bp
RNA expression pattern
Bgee	Human / Mouse (ortholog); Top expressed in: C1 segment; Brodmann area 9; prefrontal cortex; right frontal lobe; putamen; hypothalamus; cingulate gyrus; anterior cingulate cortex; substantia nigra; caudate nucleus / Top expressed in: primary visual cortex; superior frontal gyrus; zygote; epithelium of stomach; dentate gyrus of hippocampal formation granule cell; hippocampus proper; nucleus of stria terminalis; prefrontal cortex; piriform cortex; anterior horn of spinal cord; More reference expression data
BioGPS	n/a
Orthologs
Databases	NCBI: entry; OMA: entry
Species	Human	Mouse
Entrez	256472	381199
Ensembl	ENSG00000179292	ENSMUSG00000061451
UniProt	Q8N4L1	Q6GQT5
RefSeq (mRNA)	NM_153266	NM_001001885
RefSeq (protein)	NP_694998	NP_001001885
Location (UCSC)	Chr 11: 66.29 – 66.3 Mb	Chr 19: 5.07 – 5.09 Mb
PubMed search
- Wikidata
View/Edit Human	View/Edit Mouse

Transmembrane protein 151A is a protein that is encoded by the TMEM151A gene.

== Gene ==
The gene encoding transmembrane protein 151A is located on the positive strand of chromosome 11q13.2 and has two exons. The gene consists of a total of 2538 nucleotides, 1407 of which encode for the amino acids of the final transcript.

== Protein ==
Transmembrane protein 151A has 468 amino acids, weighs 51,278 daltons, and is an integral component of cellular membranes. Transmembrane protein 151A has three transmembrane domains. The N-terminus of the protein is located in the cytosol and the C-terminus is located in the extracellular matrix. According to Compute pI, this protein has a molecular weight of approximately 51 kDa, which is the same molecular weight provided by NCBI protein. Sigma-Aldrich demonstrates that TMEM151A has a molecular weight of approximately 55 kDa which suggests that the protein may undergo post-translational modifications. The theoretical pI of the whole protein is approximately 8. Exon 1 is smaller and more acidic than exon 2. Transmembrane domain 2 is acidic, although it is located in exon 2 which averages to be basic. TMEM151A has no known isoforms, and is a part of family pfam15857 with one paralogue: TMEM151B.

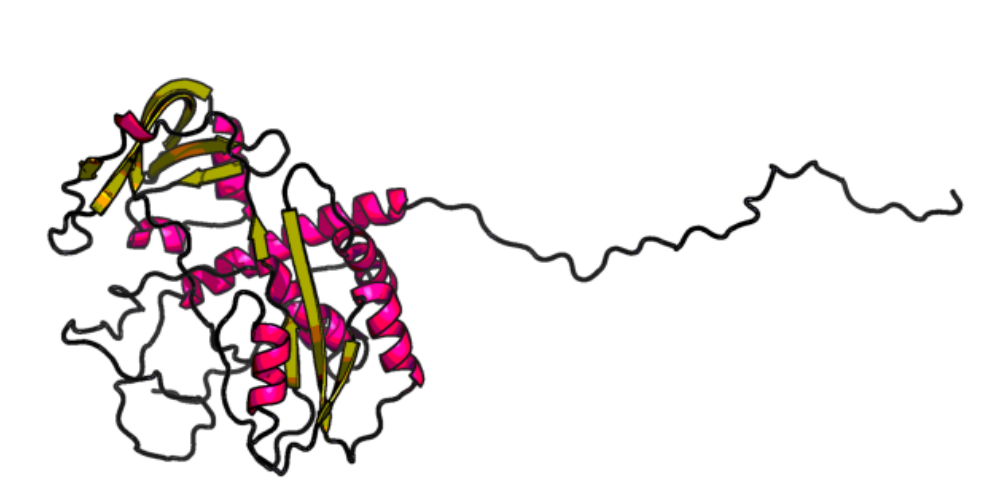
Tertiary structure TMEM151A as predicted by Swiss Model. The arrows represent beta sheets and the coils represent alpha helices.

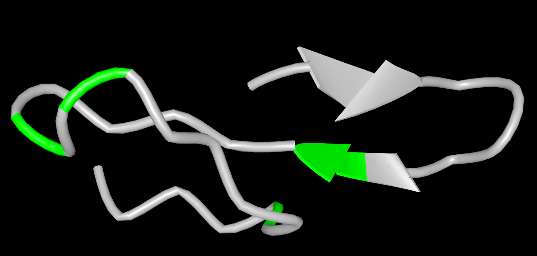
Predicted tertiary structure of TMEM151A with hydrophobic elements highlighted in green.

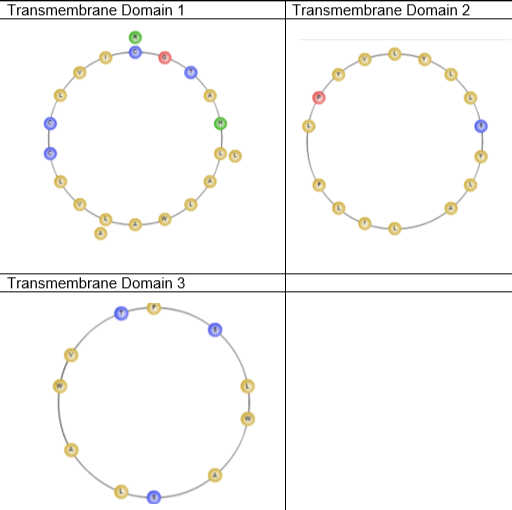
TMEM151A transmembrane domains visualized as helical wheels

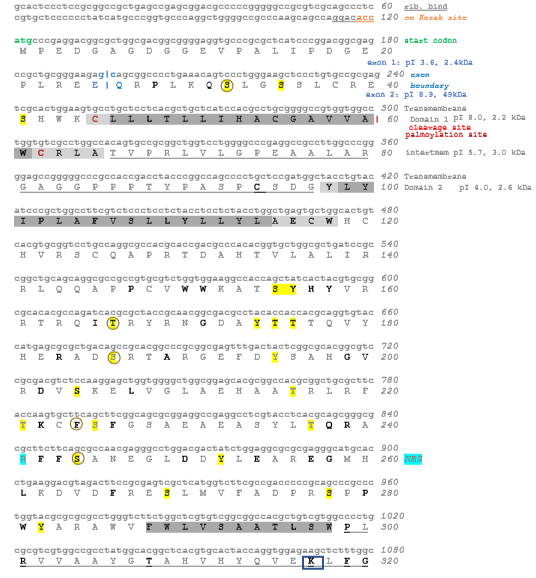
TMEM151A Annotated Protein N-Terminus

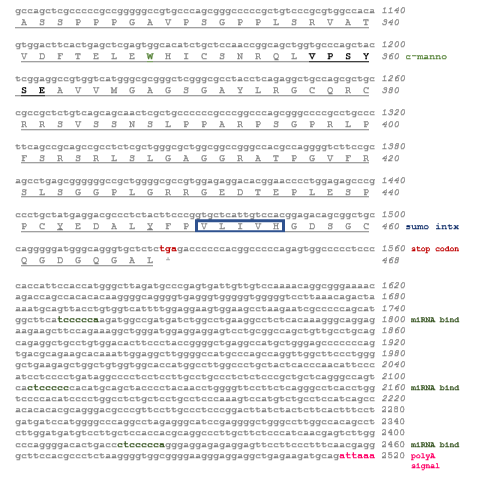
TMEM151A Annotated Translation C-Terminus

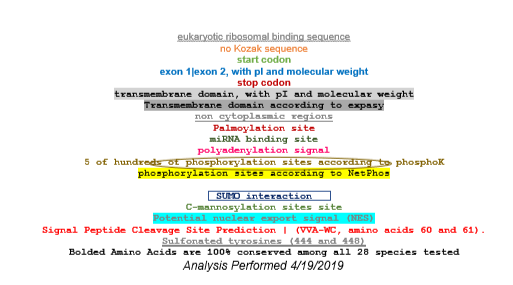
TMEM151A annotated translation key

The secondary structure of the protein is predicted to consist of approximately alpha helices and beta sheets (the exact location and number of which depend on the program which is used for the prediction) but no coiled coils. Diagrams of the predicted tertiary structure and transmembrane domains are to the right.

== Protein compositional analysis ==
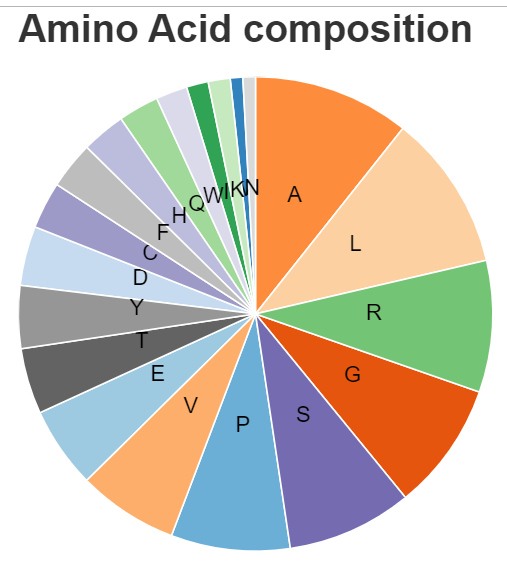
TMEM151A amino acid composition

TMEM151A animation. The green spaces represent regions of the protein that are found in the cytosol, the grey represents transmembrane domains, the blue circles represent extracellular regions. The red diamonds represent the locations of amino acids that are conserved in all 28 species tested. The blue line represents the predicted signal peptide cut region.

The most abundant amino acids in TMEM151A are alanine and leucine. The least abundant are lysine, methionine, and asparagine. There is less asparagine, isoleucine, and lysine than would be expected for an average protein. The internal compositional analysis of all the individual segments of the protein (ex. transmembrane domain 1, intermembrane space, n-terminus, etc.) all had amino acid abundances that fell into expected ranges except for the c-terminus. Specifically, there is less asparagine, isoleucine, and lysine and more arginine than would be expected for an average protein in the c-terminus. TMEM151A composition is highly conserved between mammals.

=== Protein level regulation ===
TMEM151A in Homo sapiens and other vertebrates (grizzly bears, chickens, and lancelets) have N-myristoylation sites in the N-terminus whereas non vertebrates (capitella teleta and water bear) instead have more phosphorylation sites instead (and one n-myrstyolation site) in the N-terminus. TMEM151A in humans has 3 glycation sites, it may have a nuclear export signal, 2 palmoylation sites, many phosphorylation sites, 1 signal peptide, 1 arginine and lysine cleavage site, and multiple O-BetaGlcNac sites. The table below lists predicted post translational modifications for TMEM151A in several species.

Number of modifications	Human	Ursus arctos horribilis	Gallus gallus	Branchiostoma floridae	Capitella teleta	Ramazzottius varieornatus
Palmoylation sites	2	2	0	1	2	2
Transmembrane regions	3	3	3	3	3	3
Phosphorylation sites*	743	765	999	574	538	1076
Sumo-interaction	1	1	1	0	0	4
Net glycation **	3	3	N/A	N/A	N/A	N/A
Nuclear export signals	3	3	2	0	8	4
Phosphorylation sites	92	91	129	70	54	102
Another prediction of transmembrane regions	3	3	3	3	3	3
Prediction of arginine and lysine cleavage sites	1	1	0	0	0	0
Signal peptide prediction	1	1	0	1	1	0
Sulfinated tyrosines	2	2	1	1	0	1
TMHMM transmembrane regions	3	3	3	3	3	3
O-beta glcnac attachment sites	multiple	multiple	multiple	multiple	multiple	multiple

== Cellular localization ==
TMEM151A protein is predicted to localize in the endoplasmic reticulum for Homo sapiens, mammals, lancelets, and some invertebrates. It is predicted to localize in the nucleus for birds and other invertebrates (Table 1).

	Humans	Ursus arctos horribilis	Gallus gallus	Branchiostoma floridae	Capitella teleta	Ramazzottius varieornatus
Endoplasmic reticulum	55.6	39.1	4.3	55.6	66.7	13
Mitochondria	22.2	30.4	17.4	11.1	0	8.7
Secretory system vesicles	11.1	0	4.3		0	4.3
Plasma membrane	11.1	13	8.7	22.2	0	34.8
Nuclear	0	8.7	52.2	0	0	17.4
Cytoplasmic	0	8.7	8.7	0	0	4.3
Extracellular	0	0	4.3	0	11.1	8.7
Vacuolar	0	0	0	11.1	11.1	0
Golgi	0	0	0	0	11.1	0

Table 1: Predicted localization of TMEM151 in various species

== Gene level regulation ==
The TMEM151A promoter region consists of 1101 base pairs and it is directly adjacent to the base pairs which code for the first amino acid of the TMEM151A protein. Thousands of transcription factors were predicted to bind on this promoter region. Of those, 20 transcription factors are listed in the table below. Many transcription factors predicted to bind to the promoter region were related to the following categories:

1. Neural and growth related
2. Huntington's
3. KRAB/Zinc finger
4. Steroid (androgen/estrogen)

#	Transcription factor description	Matrix similarity
1	cAMP-responsive binding element	1
2	KRAB containing zinc finger protein	1
3	Huntington's disease gene regulatory region binding proteins (more downstream	0.859
4	Huntington's disease gene regulatory region binding proteins (more upstream)	0.888
5	EGR1, early growth response 1	0.906
6	GA binding protein transcription factor, alpha (likely involved in nuclear control of mitochondrial function and cytochrome oxidase expression)	0.935
7	ZF5 POZ domain zinc finger protein	0.836
8	ZF1-myeloid zinc finger 1 protein	0.992
9	Nerve growth factor induced protein C	0.803
10	Estrogen Receptor 2	0.914
11	GATA-GATA binding factor 1	0.989
12	Pleomorphic adenoma gene 1 (salivary gland tumor)	1
13	Glial cells (nerve support) missing homolog 1	0.953
14	Androgene receptor binding site	0.935
15	EGR/nerve growth factor induced protein C & related factors	0.902
16	KRAB domain zinc finger protein 57	0.942
17	Estrogen related receptors	0.924
18	Huntington's disease gene regulatory region binding proteins (most upstream)	0.850
19	Leucine rich repeat (in FLII) interacting protein 1	0.865
20	Krueppel-associated box-containing zinc-finger protein 57 (KRAB-ZFP 57)	0.960

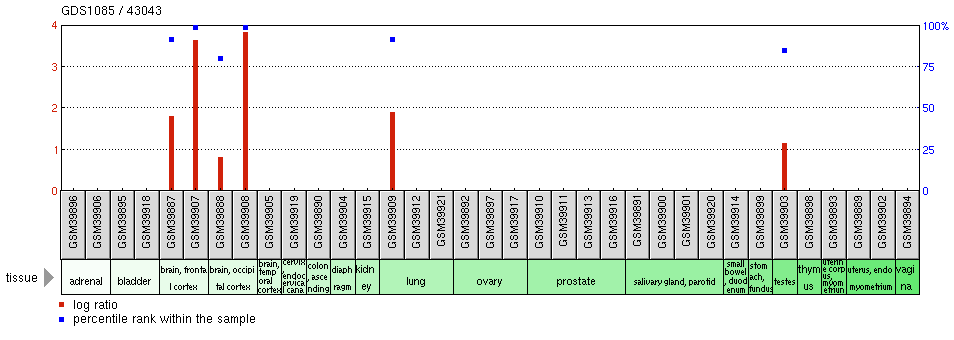
TMEM151A Homo sapiens microarray expression GDS 3113

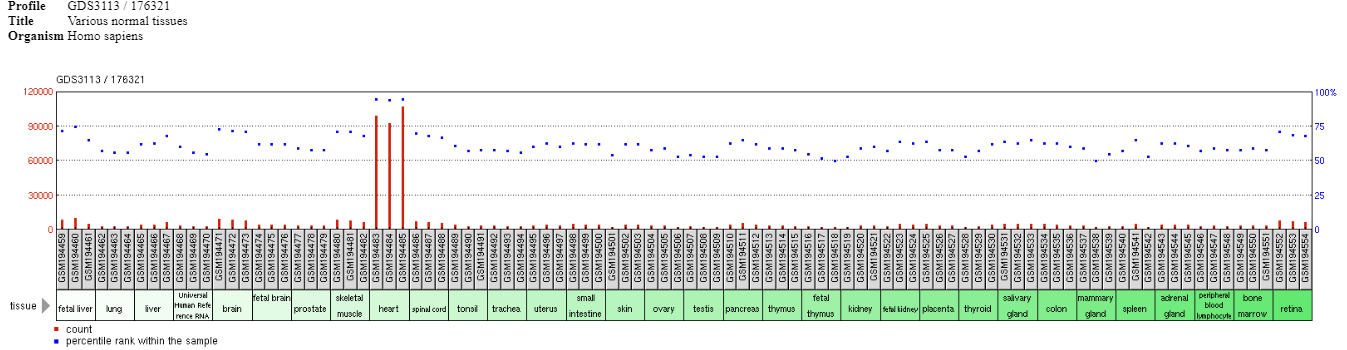
TMEM151A Homo sapiens microarray expression GDS 3113

Five different promoters influence the expression of this gene.

=== TMEM151A expression in humans ===
Immunohistochemistry demonstrates that TMEM151A RNA is primarily expressed in the brain (specifically the hippocampus, caudate, cerebellum, and pituitary gland), and has low levels of expression in the stomach, adipose tissue, retina, gallbladder, testes, colon, heart muscle, pancreas, salivary gland; a polyclonal rabbit TMEM151A antibody from Sigma Aldrich was used to get these results. These results were listed as “uncertain.”

Unigene microarray analysis shows that Homo sapiens TMEM151a DNA is found at relatively higher levels in the heart and the brain (specifically the frontal and occipital cortexes), and has lower levels of expression in multiple other tissues.

=== TMEM151A expression in other animals ===
Microarray analysis demonstrates that Mus musculus TMEM151a DNA has increased levels of expression in the heart, and has lower levels of expressions in multiple other tissues. Results from the Allen Brain Atlas demonstrate that the mouse isocortex has increased levels of in situ hybridization with TMEM151A. Microarray analysis of Canis lupus familiaris shows that TMEM151a DNA increased in both the cerebrum and the pancreas.

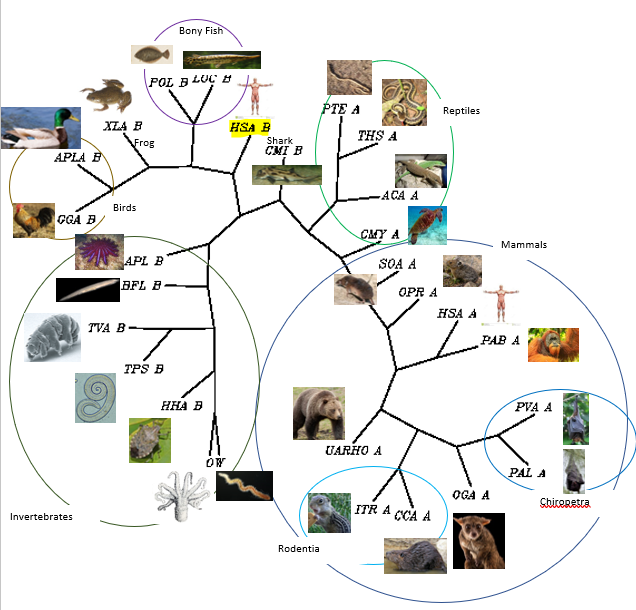
Orthologue space TMEM151A

== Homology and evolution ==
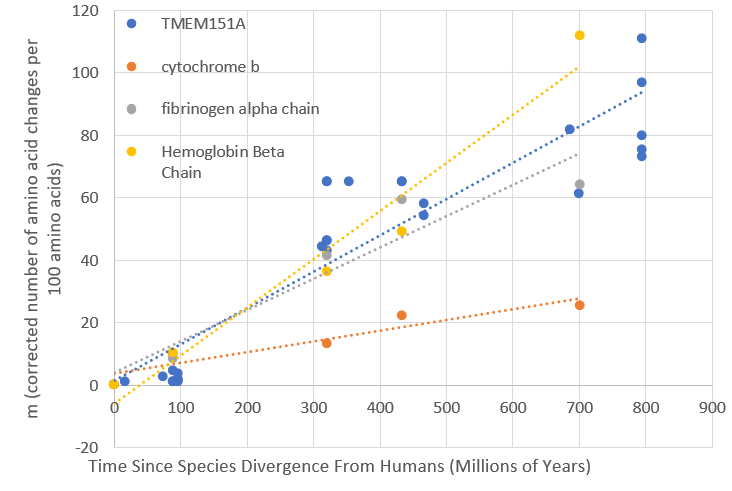
Transmembrane protein 151A rate of evolution in comparison to cytochrome C, fibrinogen, and hemoglobin.

Transmembrane protein 151A has one paralogue: TMEM151B which has a 50.76% identity with TMEM151A. It is hypothesized that TMEM151A first arose as a gene duplicate of TMEM151B approximately 320 Million Years Ago in reptiles. TMEM151A is evolving at approximately the same rate as Hemoglobin B.

It appears as though TMEM151 is conserved in most if not all vertebrates, and is conserved in many invertebrates (except for Porifera and Cnidaria). The details of this conclusion are listed below:

TMEM151A and TMEM151B are conserved in all of the major mammal orders: Primates, Rodentia, Lagomorpha, Chiropetra, Artiodactyla, Carnivora, Soricomorpha, and Diprotodontia. TMEM151A and TMEM151B were present in the following reptile orders: Squamata and Testudinata. TMEM151B (only) was found in many extant bird orders including: Columbiformes, Caprimulgiformes, Apodiformes, and Cuculiformes. TMEM151A was not present in any bird species. This suggests that TMEM151A evolved via gene duplication approximately 320 million years ago, as reptiles do have both TMEM151A and TMEM151B, but birds only have TMEM151A.

TMEM151B is present in the amphibian order Anura. TMEM151B could not be found in the amphibian order Caudata (newts and salamanders) or Apoda (caecilians) in either BLAST or BLAT (bioinformatics). This absence in amphibians may be due to (1) a lack of records or (2) genetic divergence. TMEM151B is present in several bony fish orders including: perciformes, tetraodontiformes, and siluriformes. It could not be found in the bony fish order lophiiformes. TMEM151B is present in cartilaginous fishes, specifically sharks. TMEM151B was not found for lampreys or rays in BLAST; however, TMEM151B was found in BLAT for lampreys. This suggests that TMEM151B is likely found in many cartilaginous fishes; it is simply not recorded. TMEM151B could not be found in jawless fish in either BLAST or BLAT.

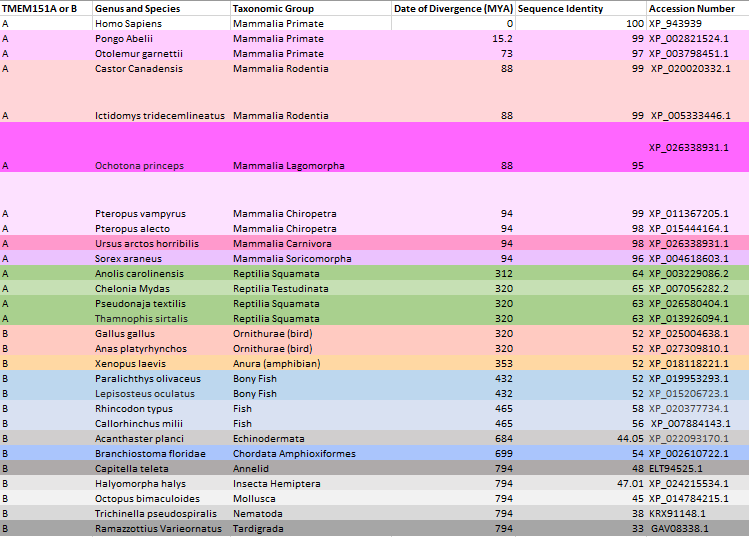
This table shows a list of TMEM151 orthologues in 28 species. The table demonstrates whether TMEM151A or TMEM151B is found in the animal, the name of the species as well as its clade, the percent identity of the orthologue to humans, how many millions of years ago the species diverged from humans, and the NCBI accession code for the orthologue.

TMEM151B could not be found in tunicates, but it was found in one lancelet. As TMEM151B was found in lancelets, TMEM151B is found in Echinodermata, but not found in Porifera, nor Cnidaria. TMEM151B is also found in Annelida, Mollusca, Nematoda, Tardigrada, and Arthropoda.

== Protein interactions ==
According to STRING, TMEM151A is predicted to interact with the following proteins:

- TMEM71 – May localize in the mitochondrion or plasma membrane. It is primarily expressed in the circulatory (blood, lymph node, cardiac cells) and nervous system (brain, cortex, cerebellum, spinal cord, tibial nerve).
- TMEM179-is located on chromosome 14, and or 90. It is predicted to localize in the mitochondria membrane
- C9orf64 – this encodes the queosine salvage protein (the function of which is not well understood). Expression of this gene is highest in the duodenum and small intestine, it is a member of the DUF 2419 family.
- C1orf167 – is a protein encoding gene of unknown function. It is associated with neural tube defects and folate sensitivity.
- ZSCAN32 – is a human cervical cancer suppressor gene. It has RNA polymerase II specific activity
- SAMD10 – stands for sterile alpha motif domain containing protein 10. It is located on chromosome 20. Diseases associated with this gene include retinitis pigmentosa. It is predicted to localize in the nucleus/nucleoplasm.
- ANKDD1A – is located on chromosome 15 and is predicted to localize in the peroxisome and/or cytosol.
- SOWAHD – Sosondowah Ankyrin repeat domain family member D. It is located on chromosome X and predicted to localize in the mitochondrion.
- CCDC135 – is associated with diseases: Meckel syndrome, type 6 and type 1. It is located on chromosome 16 and is predicted to localize in the nucleus, cytosol, and most likely in the cytoskeleton.
- TMEM88 – is located on chromosome 17 and is crucial for heart development and aids in the specification of lineage commitment of cardiomyocyte development

== Research in humans ==
Illumina analysis has demonstrated that TMEM151A is one of 336 genes that may be used, in combination with the other genes, to diagnose colorectal cancer and/or the stage of that cancer. Specifically, TMEM151A is significantly upregulated in human monocytes circulating in the blood during colorectal cancer. TMEM151A is in linkage disequilibrium with gene CACNA1C; CACNA1C mutation is significantly associated with bipolar disorder p < 0.05. An unspecified variant of TMEM151A is one of 27 genes (out of 47,296 rare exonic variants that were analyzed) that has been associated with major depression disorder in Mexican Americans. These Mexican Americans experienced hyperactivation of the hypothalamic-pituitary-adrenal axis due to significant stress. Transplanted livers that came from deceased donors had a 4.83-fold upregulated expression of TMEM151A when compared to the expression levels of TMEM151A in livers that came from live donors.
