= Calliostoma cnidophilum =

Scientific classification
- Kingdom: Animalia
- Phylum: Mollusca
- Class: Gastropoda
- Subclass: Vetigastropoda
- Order: Trochida
- Family: Calliostomatidae
- Subfamily: Calliostomatinae
- Genus: Calliostoma
- Species: C. cnidophilum

Binomial name
- Calliostoma cnidophilum Quinn, 1992

Species of gastropod

Calliostoma cnidophilum is a predatory species of macrobenthic sea snail, a marine gastropod mollusk in the family Calliostomatidae.

== Description ==
The height of the shell attains 14 mm.

== Distribution ==
This snail occurs in the western Atlantic Ocean. It often occurs off the Lower Antilles.
