= Macrobenthos =

Organisms that live at the bottom of a water column

Macrobenthos consists of the organisms that live at the bottom of a water column and are visible to the naked eye. In some classification schemes, these organisms are larger than 1 mm; in another, the smallest dimension must be at least 0.5 mm. They include sponges, anthozoans (corals, sea anemones and sea pens), non-cephalopod molluscs (gastropods, bivalves, chitons. etc), polychaetes, echinoderms, crustaceans and some chordates (ascidians, lancelets and benthic fish).

The marine macrobenthos community is a critical component and reliable indicator of the biotic integrity of marine ecosystems, especially the intertidal ecosystems. On the one hand, macrobenthos plays a vital role in maintaining ecosystem functions, such as material cycling in sediments and energy flow in food webs. On the other hand, macrobenthos is relatively sedentary and therefore reflects the ambient conditions of sediments, in which many pollutants (e.g., heavy metals and organic enrichment) are ultimately partitioned.

Heavy metal pollution is one of the most common anthropogenic pressures that impact marine ecosystems (e.g., intertidal zones, coastal waters, and estuaries), which has been documented by many studies throughout the world. Heavy metal contaminants can result in adverse toxic effects on benthic organisms, leading to the changes in composition, structure, and ecosystem function of macrobenthic communities. For example, in Aveiro Lagoon (Portugal), with the increase of mercury contamination, the total abundance and species richness decreased, and tolerant taxa increased; in Incheon Harbour (Korea) and the coastal zone south of Sfax (Tunisia), macrobenthic community gradually changed with the pollution levels, and species diversity decreased with decreased distance from the pollution source. However, most of the studies were conducted in the subtidal zones other than intertidal zones, which are more vulnerable to human activities.

Macrobenthos consists of numerous taxa, and different species have a different tolerance to environmental pressures. For example, polychaetes Capitella capitata and Heteromastus filiformis are naturally tolerant to environmental disturbance, which could live well in a highly organic enrichment and/or heavy metal polluted area, while some taxa (e.g., polychaete Magelona dakini and amphipods Perioculodes longimanus) are inherently sensitive to environmental disturbance, and could not survive in such highly polluted zones.

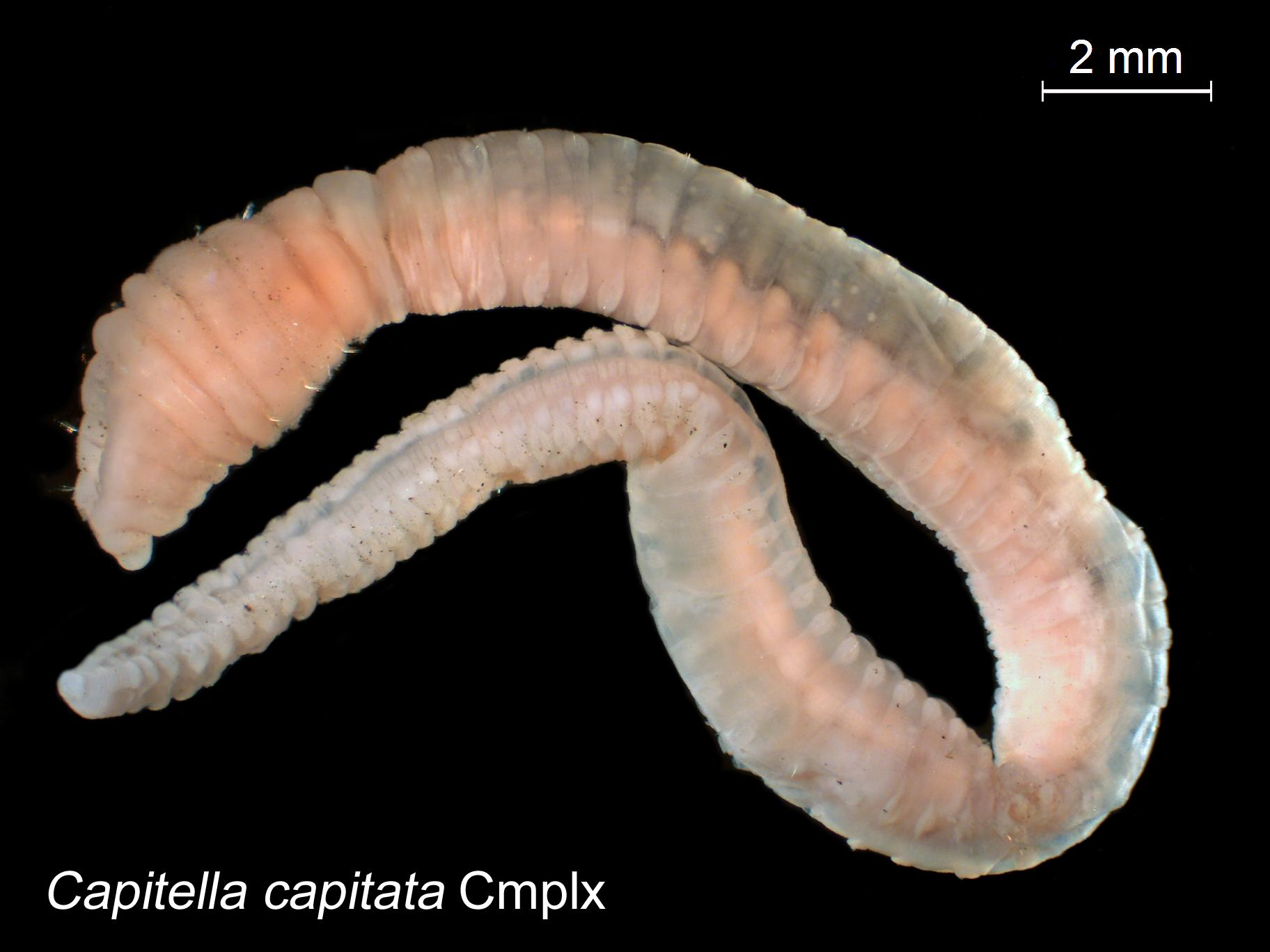
The polychaete Capitella capitata

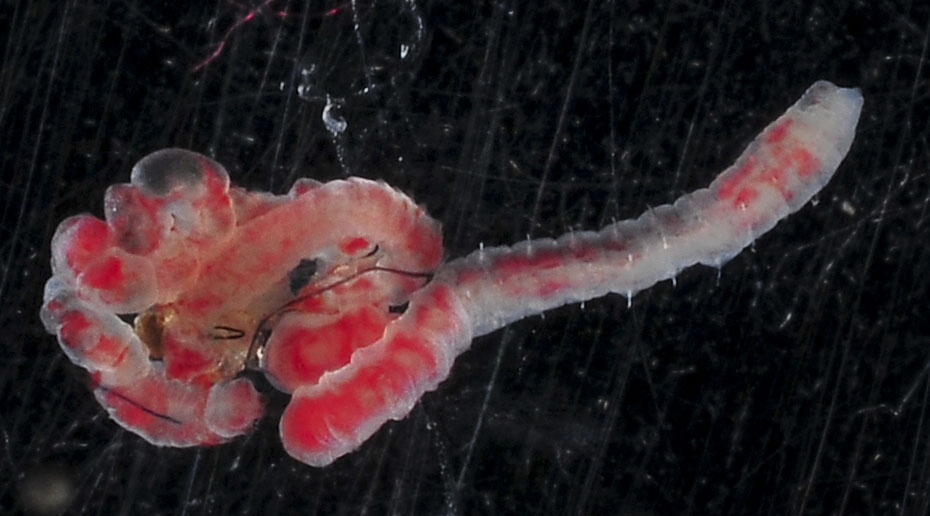
The polychaete Heteromastus filiformis

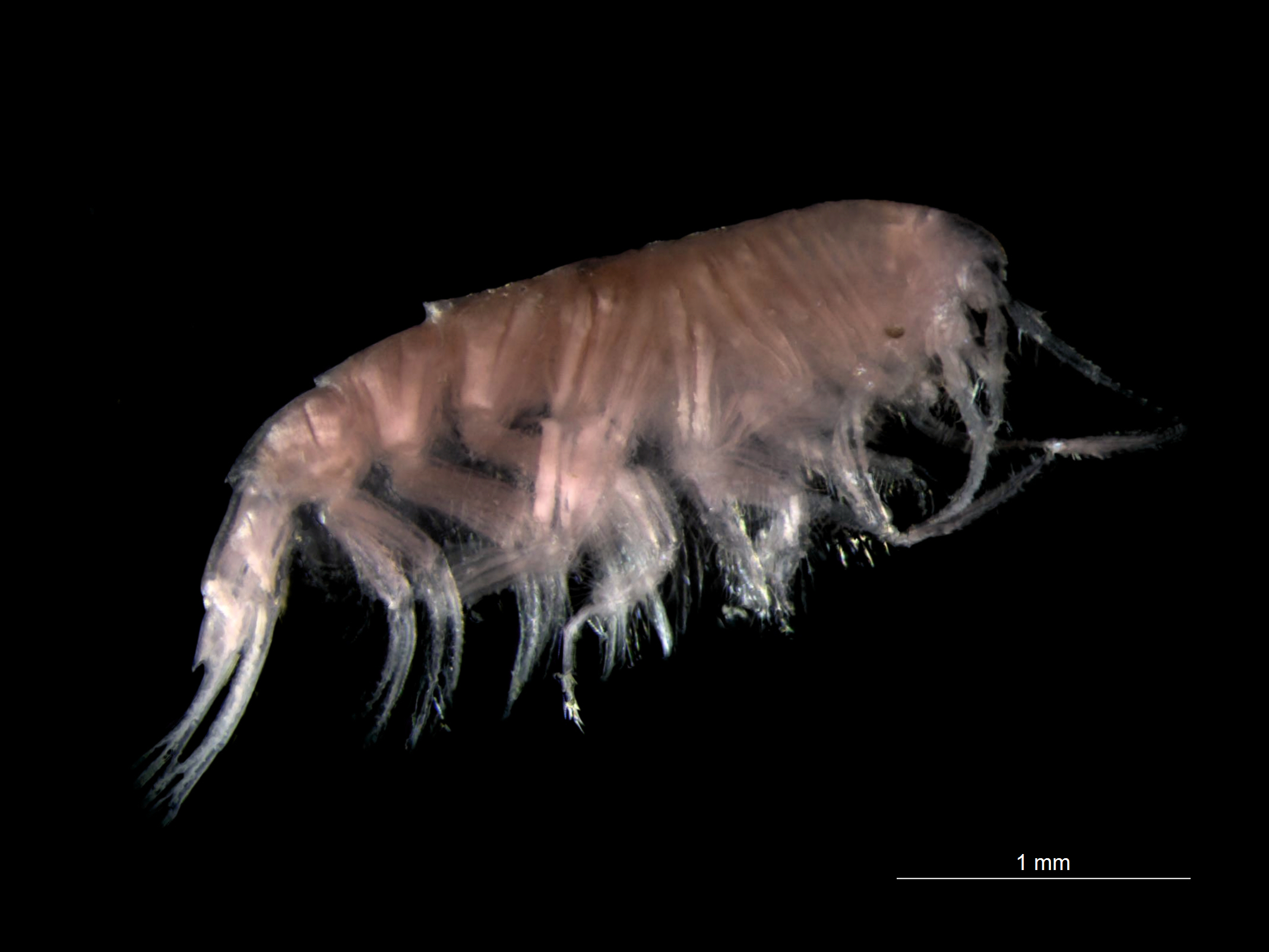
The amphipod Perioculodes longimanus

This indicates that each species has evolved a unique survival strategy to adapt to different environmental conditions, even though it may be similar in some ways with other species. When facing loads of contaminants, such as metal(loid)s and organic enrichment or other contaminants gradients, macrobenthos have to make some reactions to resist such adverse environmental conditions. Therefore, macrobenthic responses may reflect different types and levels of pollutant impacts.

A visual examination of macroorganisms at the bottom of an aquatic ecosystem can be a good indicator of water quality.

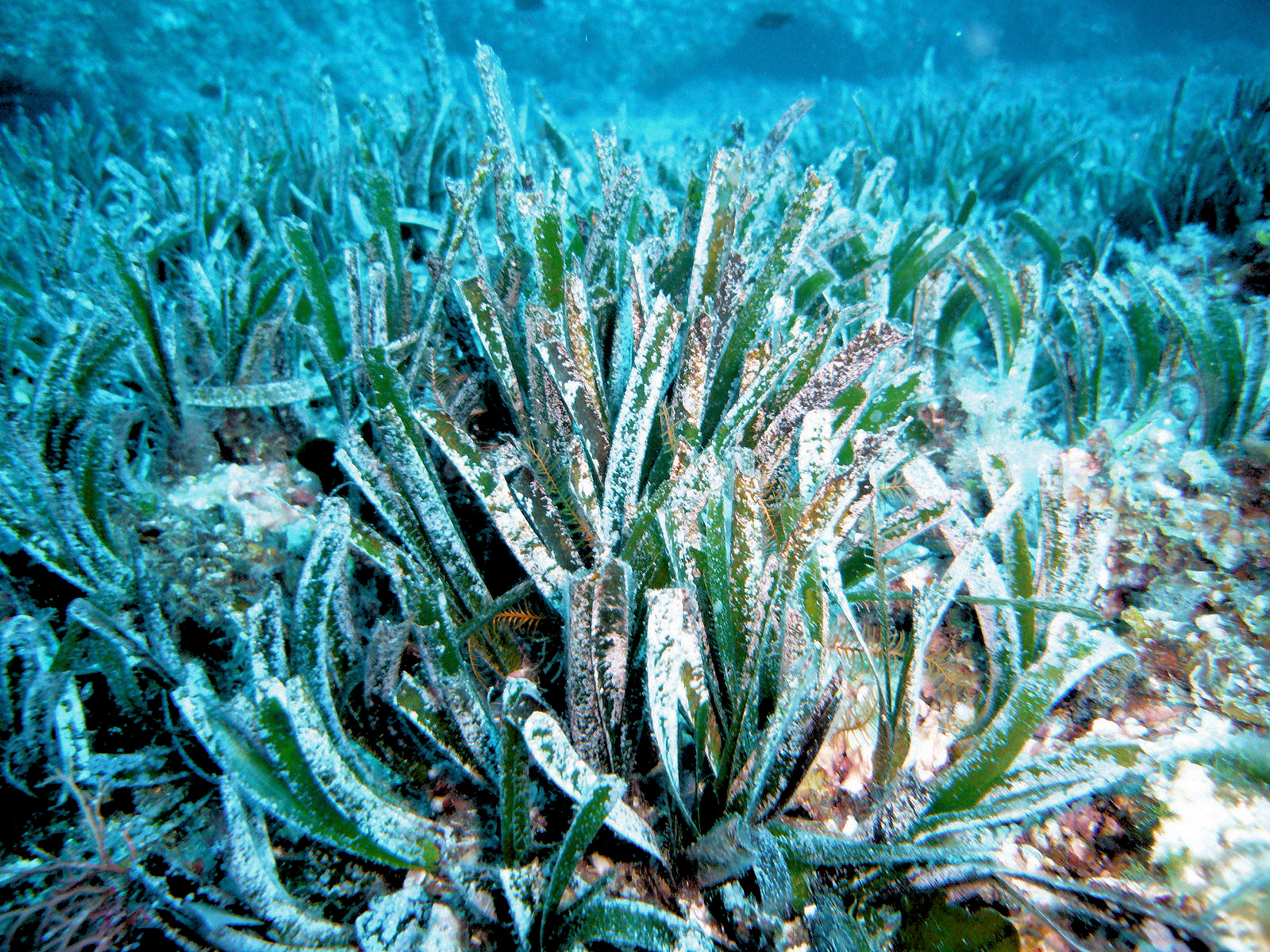
Seagrass

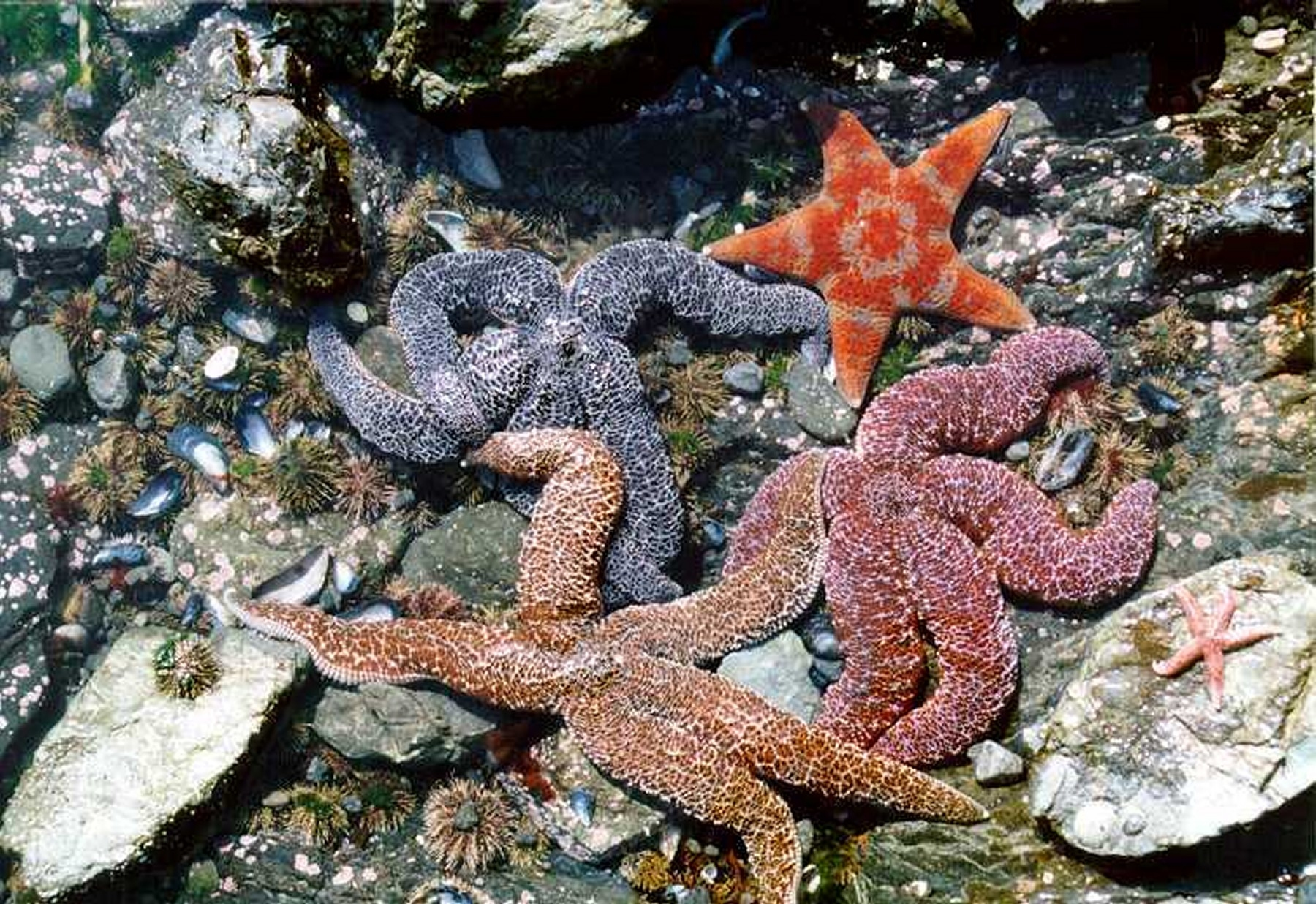
Echinoderms

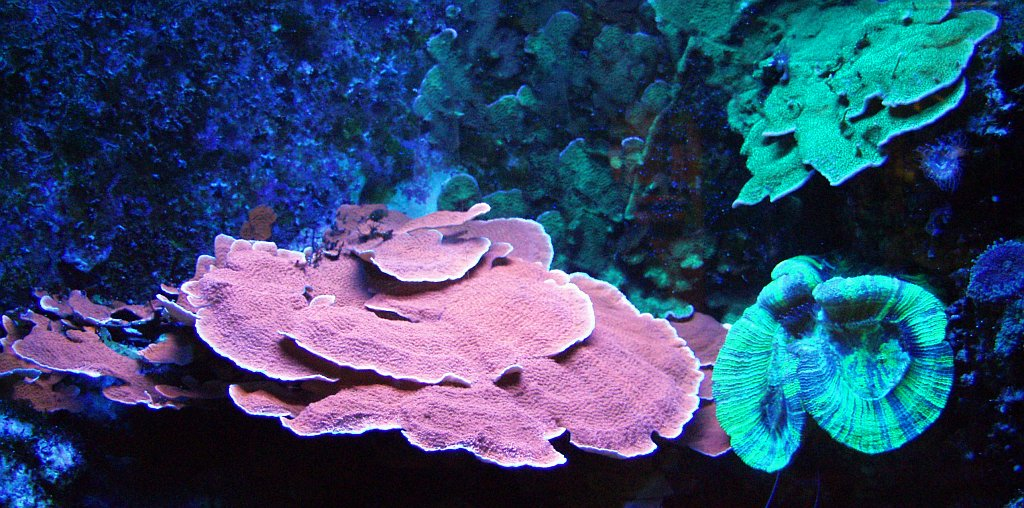
Stony corals

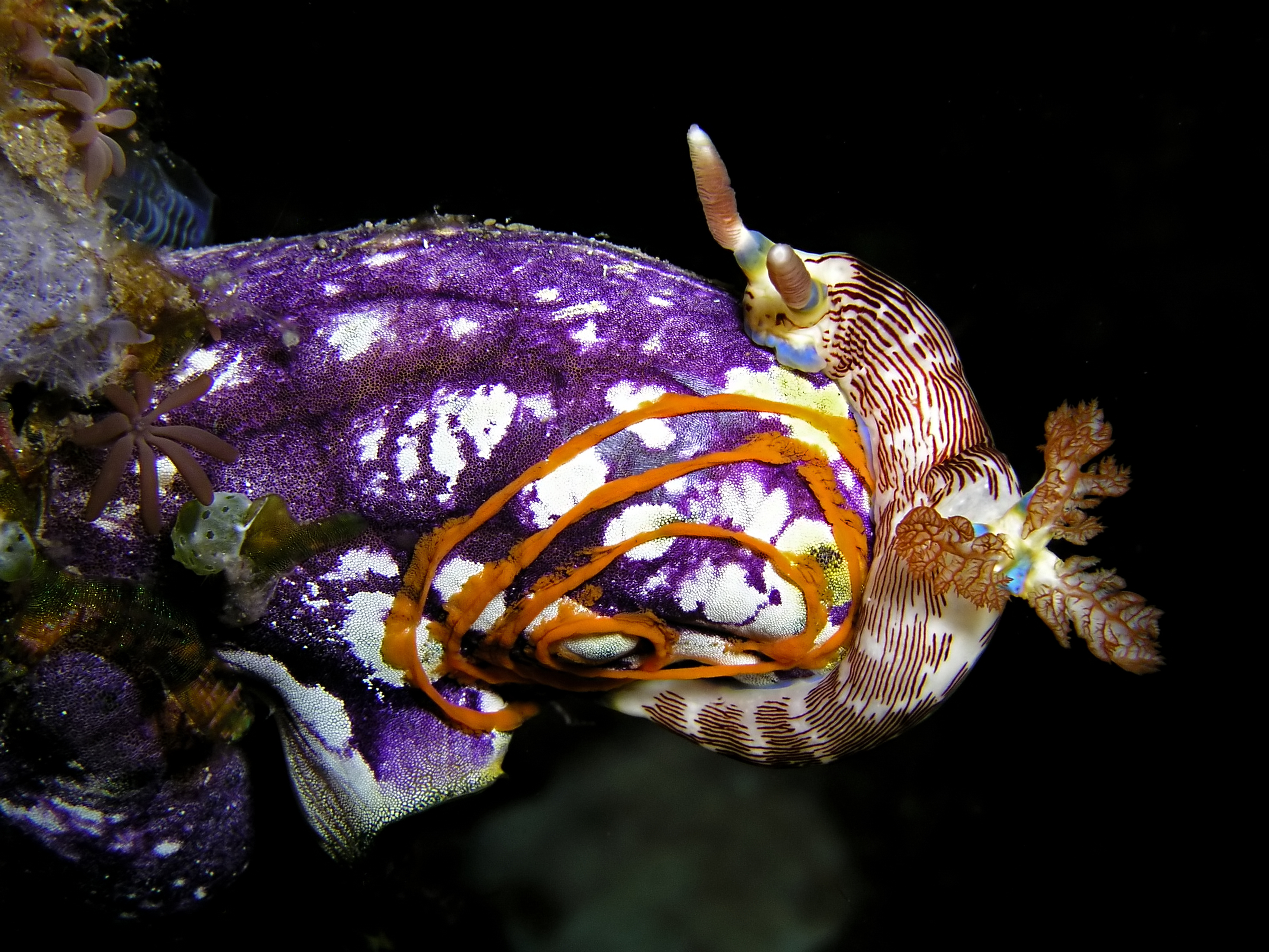
A sea squirt being used as a substrate for a nudibranch's egg spiral
