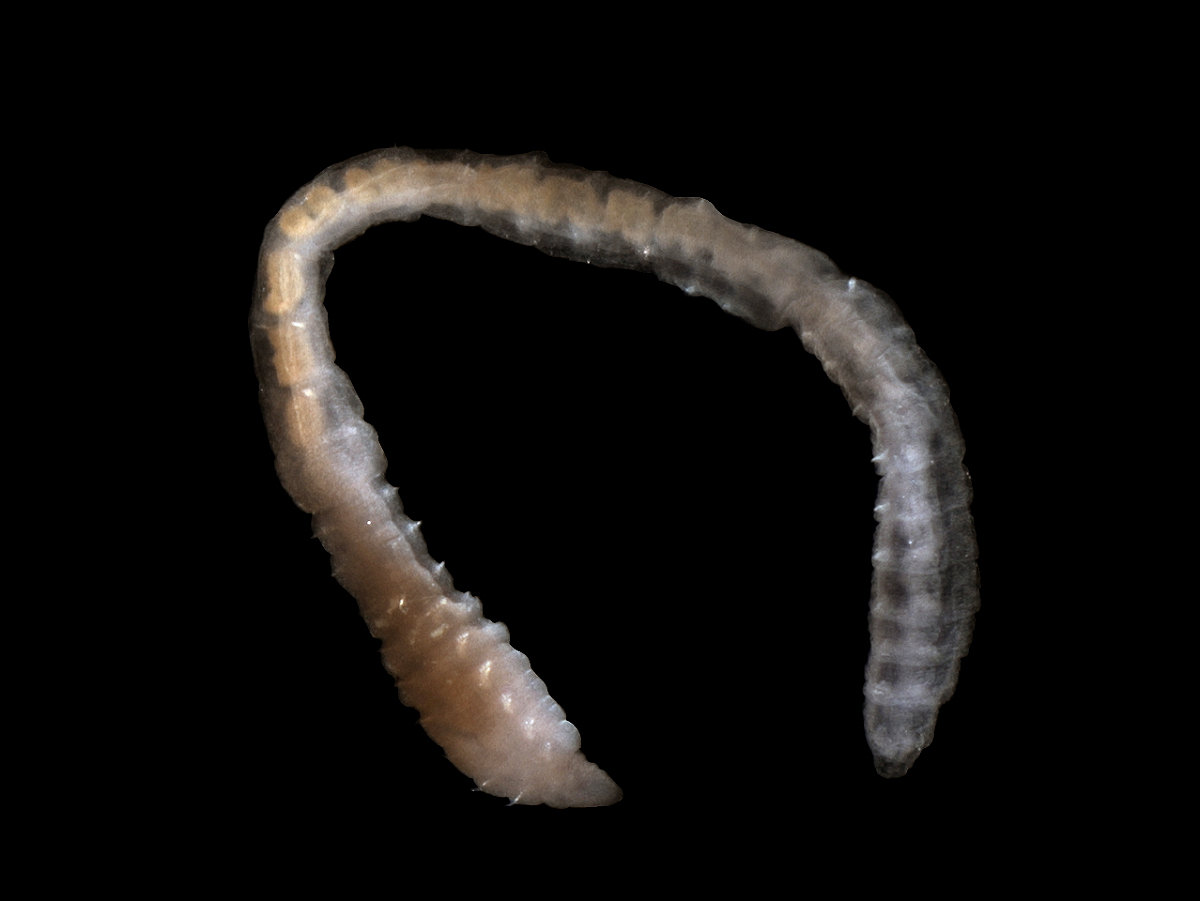
- Capitella capitata (Fabricius, 1780)

Scientific classification
- Kingdom: Animalia
- Phylum: Annelida
- Clade: Pleistoannelida
- Clade: Sedentaria
- Family: Capitellidae
- Genus: Capitella; Blainville, 1828

Species
- See text

= Capitella =

Genus of annelids

Capitella is a polychaete worm genus in the family Capitellidae.

== Species ==
- Capitella aberranta
- Capitella capitata
- Capitella caribaeorum
- Capitella dizonata
- Capitella giardi
- Capitella gracilis
- Capitella hermaphrodita
- Capitella intermedia
- Capitella jonesi
- Capitella minima
- Capitella ovincola
- Capitella perarmata
- Capitella perarmatus
- Capitella singularis
- Capitella teleta
- Capitella tripartita
