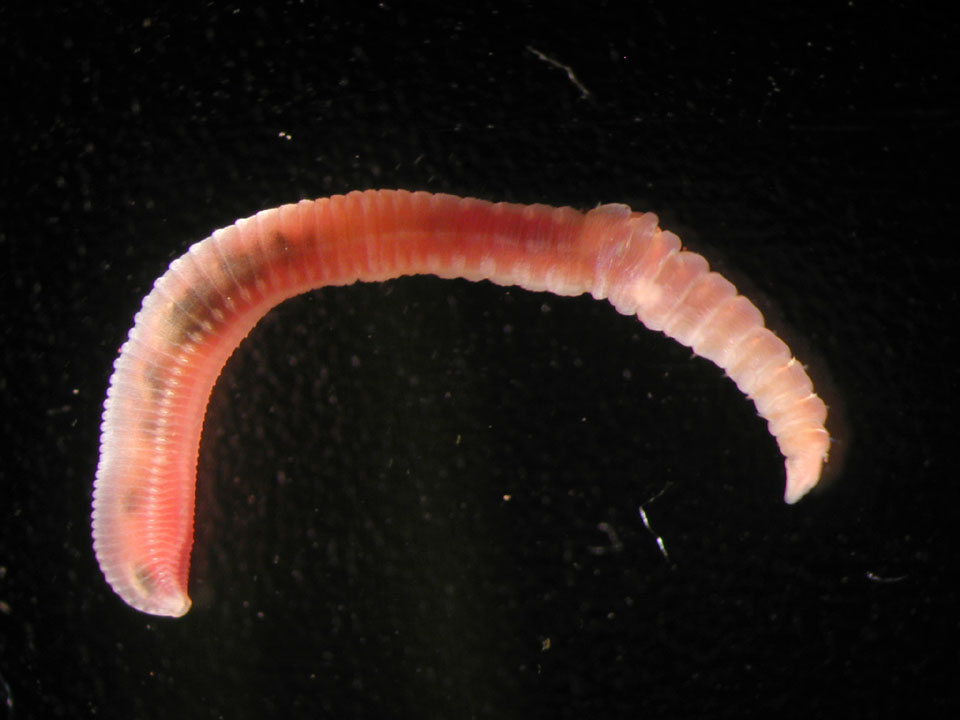
- Adult male

Scientific classification
- Kingdom: Animalia
- Phylum: Annelida
- Clade: Pleistoannelida
- Clade: Sedentaria
- Family: Capitellidae
- Genus: Capitella
- Species: C. teleta

Binomial name
- Capitella teleta Blake, Grassle & Eckelbarger, 2009

= Capitella teleta =

Species of annelid

Capitella teleta is a small, cosmopolitan, segmented annelid worm. It is a well-studied invertebrate, which has been cultured for use in laboratories for over 30 years. C. teleta is the first marine polychaete to have its genome sequenced.

== Description ==
=== Initial discovery ===
For many years researchers believed that Capitella capitata was the only representative of this genus that survived, and flourished, in polluted environments. After the oil spill that occurred near Cape Cod in West Falmouth, Massachusetts in 1969, researchers collected sediment and found an abundance of what they believed to be C. capitata. However, subsequent research showed that while the individuals collected from that region had very similar gross morphology, their life histories, methods of reproduction and genetics indicated there were at least six distinct species. Capitella species I, eventually described as Capitella teleta in 2009, was one of the initial species identified from these surveys.

=== Etymology ===
After 30 years of research on the group, Capitella teleta was officially described in 2009 by Blake et al. The species name is derived from the Greek word teleta, meaning "initiation". This word symbolizes that it was the first alternative Capitella species that was identified.

=== Phylogenetics ===
A 2018 molecular phylogeny of the family Capitellidae established clear monophyly and showed 8 genera. The phylogeny utilized 36 capitellid species and combined data from 18S, 28S, H3, and COI gene sequences. This study also established Capitellidae as the sister group to Echiura. While the study attempted to map morphological characters to the molecular phylogeny, this was not phylogenetically informative and a more detailed re-evaluation of morphology could help to elucidate character trait evolution.

=== Taxonomic morphology ===
Capitella teleta has a narrow, segmented body with reduced parapodia and is red in color. There are nine anterior thoracic segments and many more abdominal segments. New segments are added throughout the lifespan from a posterior subterminal growth zone called the posterior growth zone. Like other polychaetes, C. teleta has fine bristles or setae. Setae are segmentally repeated along the body, with morphologically distinct setae in the thoracic (hooded hooks) and abdominal segments (capillary setae). This animal exhibits sexual dimorphism and males have dorsally-positioned genital spines on setigers 7–8 while females have paired ovaries in the abdominal segments. Generally, there are separate sexes; however, hermaphroditism is possible when there are low densities of females. Males, females and hermaphrodites are of similar size (maximum size collected was a male that is 24 mm in length).

== Ecology ==
=== Habitat ===
Capitella teleta lives in the shallow-water or intertidal marine environment. It is also found in salt marshes and is often found in high concentrations in disturbed soft sediments. It is a member of the infaunal benthic community. C. teleta burrows through the sediment by peristalsis, using its hydrostatic skeleton and contraction of longitudinal and circular muscles in the body wall. The thoracic segments of C. teleta also contain helical muscles that are proposed to generate additional force for burrowing. Capitellids are commonly thought of as opportunistic in nature, due to their ability to inhabit and flourish in organically enriched marine sediments.

This organism is commonly found in sediments along the east and west coasts of North America. Additional reports have placed this group in the Mediterranean region as well as Japan.

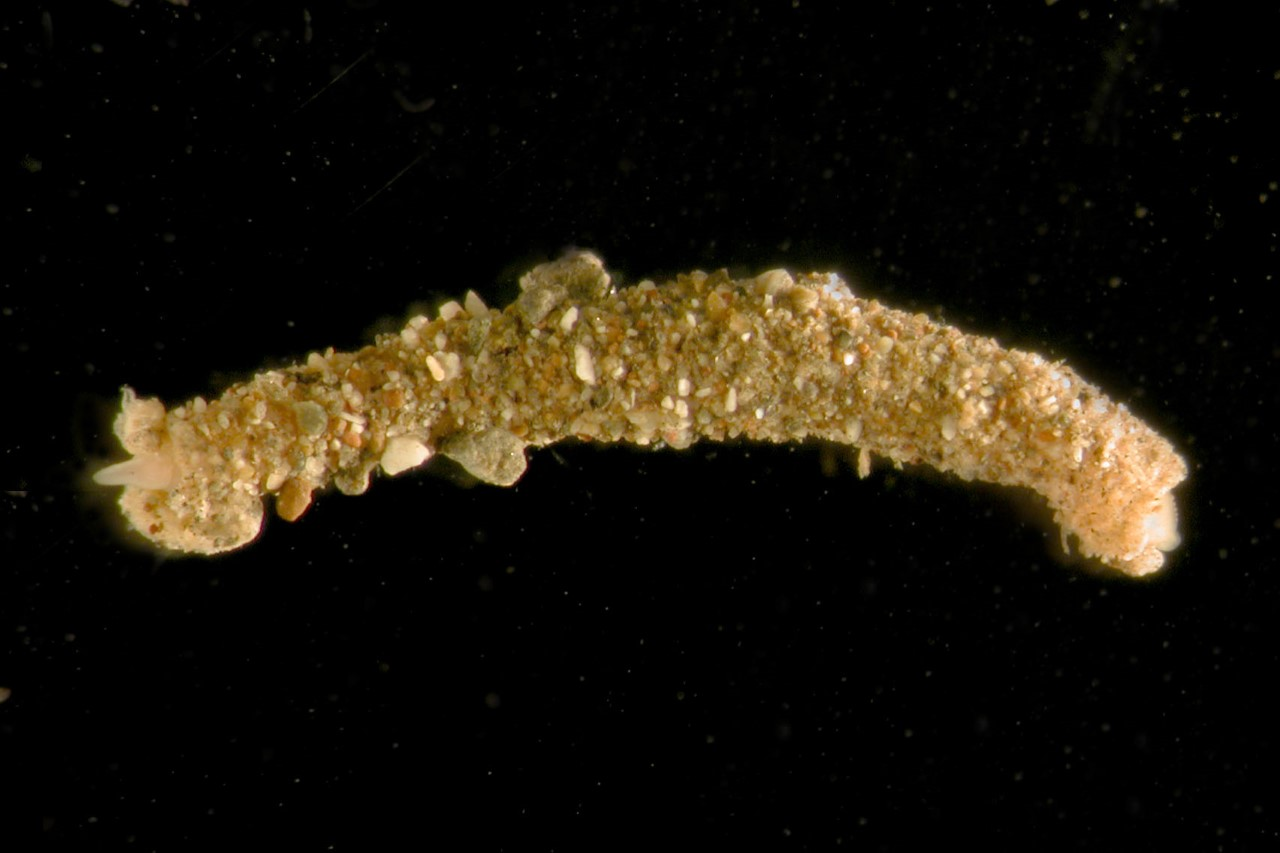
Brood tube

=== Life history ===
Capitella teleta embryos and early larval stages develop in a brood tube that surrounds the mother. The embryos are approximately 200 μm in diameter. Over the course of approximately a week, the embryos develop into non-feeding larvae which form musculature, a centralized nervous system, two circular ciliary bands, two eye spots, segments, and setae. The larvae are non-feeding and the digestive system develops at a later stage than other organs. Pre-metamorphosis larvae can be categorized into nine stages, with each stage lasting approximately one day. Upon further body elongation and gut maturation, the larvae emerge from the brood tube, and swim forward with a rotational turn via the beating of cilia organized within two circular bands, the prototroch and telotroch. Larvae exhibit positive phototactic behavior in which they swim towards light, potentially an adaptation to aid in larval dispersal C. teleta is an indirect developer and undergoes metamorphosis from a swimming larva into a burrowing juvenile. Metamorphosis is characterized by cilia loss, body elongation, and crawling behavior. Marine sediment functions as a cue to initiate metamorphosis into juvenile worms that thereafter grow into mature adults. Competent larvae can be induced to metamorphose into juveniles when exposed to the B vitamins Nicotinamide (B3) and Riboflavin (B2), suggesting that these chemical compounds may be responsible for the inductive role of the marine sediment in larval metamorphosis. The number of offspring in each brood tube can vary between 50 - 400 individuals, and is influenced by food quality.

After metamorphosis, the juveniles begin burrowing and feeding. The juvenile worms continue to grow and add segments during the eight weeks it takes to become sexually mature adults. Males and females can reproduce multiple times during their lifetime. Adults live approximately 12–14 weeks after maturation.

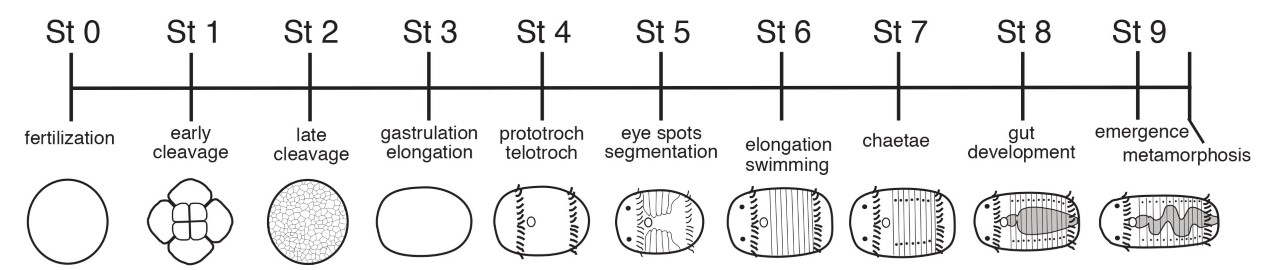
Stages of Capitella teleta larval development (Seaver et al., 2005)

=== Feeding ===
Capitella teleta feeds on the enriched sediment in which it burrows. C. teleta has a complex, regionalized alimentary canal consisting of a foregut, midgut and hindgut. It ingests the sediment by everting its proboscis, which contains a ciliated, muscular dorsal pharynx. Presence of a dorsal pharynx is uncommon in marine polychaetes, and this adaptation may have evolved independently in the family Capitellidae through selective pressures on feeding mode in the benthic marine niche they occupy.

== Research ==
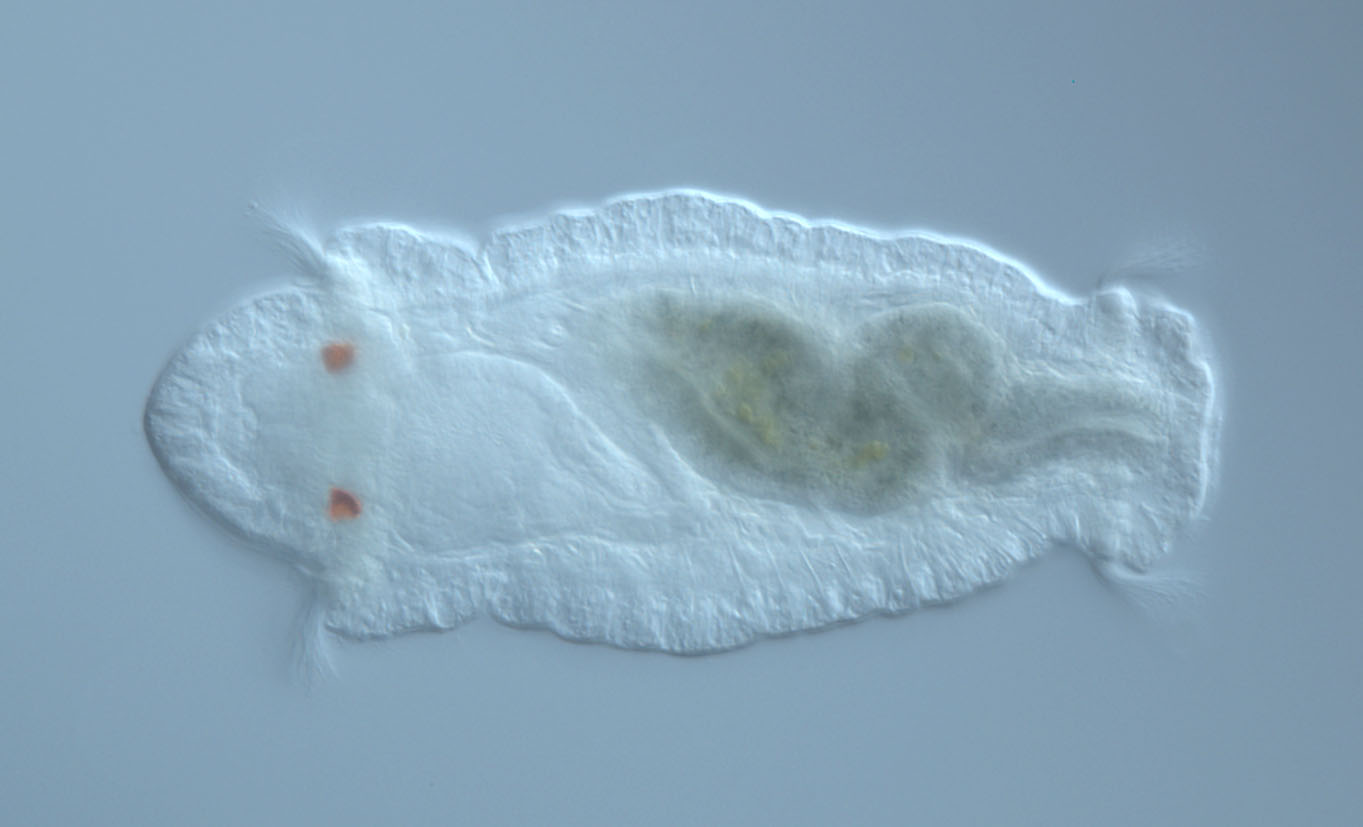
Stage 9 larvae

A wide range of techniques have been developed to investigate C. teleta developmental processes. In 2006, the first study using whole mount in situ hybridization was published. This technique allows investigation of the expression and localization of specific mRNAs within a fixed sample. Immunohistochemistry was later developed as a way to visualize specific cell types in fixed specimens. A microinjection protocol for uncleaved embryos and early cleavage stages was developed in 2010 and was used in a fate mapping study to investigate the ultimate fate of blastomeres. Other useful techniques for studying early development of the embryo are targeted deletion of single cells with an infrared laser and blastomere isolation experiments. Laser deletion was also utilized for the deletion of larval eyes at a later stage in development. The development of microinjection techniques allowed for introduction of different nucleic acid constructs that can be injected into an uncleaved zygote. This includes use of gene perturbation techniques such as Morpholino knockdown and CRISPR-Cas9 mutagenesis, and methods for living imaging such as mRNA injection. The development of each technique opens doors for new avenues of inquiry and experimentation and expands the number and complexity of questions C. teleta researchers can thoroughly investigate.

=== Embryogenesis ===
Like many species within Spiralia, C. teleta embryogenesis follows an unequal spiral cleavage program where blastomeres are born according to a predictable order, size and position. This shared stereotypic cleavage program allows for the identification of individual cells and there is a standard cell-nomenclature system. Additionally, individual cells can be microinjected with fluorescent dyes and their descendants tracked to determine the lineage of particular tissues and larval structures. Through this method, a comprehensive fate map was created for C. teleta. In general, there is substantial similarity of cell fates between C. teleta and other Spiralia. For instance, in C. teleta and several other spiralians, cells derived from the A, B, C, and D embryo quadrants respectively give rise to the left, ventral, right, and dorsal portions of the larval body. However, the origin of mesoderm differs across species. In C. teleta, mesoderm is generated from cells called 3c and 3d that are derived from both the C and D embryo quadrants, but in the annelid Platynereis dumerilii and in several mollusks, trunk mesoderm is generated from a single cell 4d.

The establishment of the dorsal-ventral axis during early embryological development has also been extensively studied in C. teleta. It is reported that micromere 2d, a cell that is born when the embryo has 16 cells, has organizing activity which enables it to induce dorsal-ventral polarity within the embryo. Fate map studies have demonstrated that cell 2d gives rise to ectoderm in the larval trunk and pygidium in C. teleta, while descendants of the first quartet micromeres give rise to structures in the larval head. When micromere 2d is laser ablated, 2d derived structures as well as dorsal-ventral organization in the head is lost. This suggests a requirement for 2d to be present in order to induce the proper formation of the head along a dorsal-ventral axis. When micromeres 2d^{1} and 2d^{2}, the immediate descendants of 2d, are both deleted, the resulting larvae retain dorsal-ventral organization within the head. It was therefore concluded that in C. teleta micromere 2d has organizing activity in patterning the dorsal-ventral body axis. Furthermore, perturbation studies have shown that the dorsal-ventral axis is primarily patterned via the Activin/Nodal pathway.

=== Regeneration ===
Many annelids possess the capability to regenerate their anterior, posterior, or both ends of their body. C. teleta is capable of posterior regeneration. Both juveniles and adults can regenerate their posterior halves quite well. A staging system has been established, describing the sequential regeneration events in juveniles of C. teleta. The first stage of regeneration encompasses the first 24 hours following amputation or injury. This stage is marked by wound healing and a change in cell proliferation patterns. Wound healing occurs within 4–6 hours of amputation, as the circular muscles in the body wall contract, bringing the epithelium together to cover the wound. During this time, cell proliferation patterns are different from uncut animals; while cell proliferation is still observed throughout the body, there is a marked reduction at the wound site. In stage II, approximately 2 days after amputation, a small blastema forms that contains proliferating cells, and there is a diffuse network of neurites extending from the old ventral nerve cord tissue into the blastema. In stage III, approximately 3 days after amputation, the blastema becomes more organized as proliferating cells pack closely together in the newly formed tissue and multiple neurites condense into nerves. In stage IV, 5 days after amputation, there continues to be an increase in cell proliferation, but less so in the new tissue. The neural projections into the blastema become even more organized and patterned. Additionally, the posterior growth zone, pygidium, and hindgut reform. Finally, Stage 5 is marked by the presence and continued addition of new segments with differentiated tissues and ganglia. The entire regeneration process in C. teleta adults is completed within about two weeks The rate of regeneration can vary among individuals, especially pertaining to health and nutrition intake.

Hox genes, patterning genes that regulate segment identity during development in many animals, and are expressed in the blastema of C. teleta during posterior regeneration. This suggests a role in the regeneration process, but the exact expression patterns do not make an obvious link to establishment of segment identity in newly formed tissue during regeneration. The shift in Hox gene expression in the blastema during posterior regeneration is indicative of limited morphallaxis, in addition to epimorphic regeneration

The regeneration of the germline in embryos has also been investigated. In early stage embryos, the germline precursor (cell 3D) was deleted using an infrared laser. 13% of screened larvae showed presence of multipotent progenitor cells (MPCs), indicating some regeneration of the germline. Furthermore, all juveniles two weeks post-metamorphosis have MPCs. Finally, almost all adult worms raised from treated embryos developed functional reproductive systems and produced offspring that developed into swimming larvae.

=== Toxicology ===
Capitella teleta is an indicator species for environments contaminated with organic pollution. C. teleta has the ability to colonize these habitats rapidly with high growth rates. These characteristics have led to their use in various toxicological studies. Their population and/or individual- level responses to pollutant exposures have been investigated in various toxicants such as synthetic musk, acetyl cedrene, fluoranthene, benzo[a]pyrene, fluoxetine, cadmium, copper oxide nanoparticles, and silver nanoparticles. Recently, the effects of the fluoranthene-spiked sediments on the gut microbiome were investigated and several taxa of bacteria were identified; these taxa may play a role in the metabolism of fluoranthene.

== Genome ==
The genome of Capitella teleta was sequenced in concert with the owl limpet, Lottia gigantean, and the freshwater leech, Helobdella robusta, by the Joint Genome Institute in 2013. This was the first attempt at sequencing a marine polychaete and the sequencing and study of these three spiralian genomes provided an important perspective of early bilaterian evolutionary processes. Additionally, this work showed strong support for the monophyletic grouping of Lophotrochozoa.

The researchers found that when compared to other animal genomes, all three organisms possessed genome organization, gene structure and functional content that was more closely related to invertebrate deuterostome genomes than those of fellow invertebrate protostomes. C. teleta possesses a highly conserved and slowly evolving genome with respect to other metazoans.

Karyotype analysis revealed that C. teleta has 10 pairs of chromosomes.

A new chromosome-level genome assembly of Capitella teleta was generated using long-read and short-read sequencing together with Hi-C chromatin conformation capture. The assembly closely matches the species’ expected genome size (~243.6 Mb) and contains a highly complete set of conserved genes. Analyses revealed extensive rearrangements in both the nuclear and mitochondrial genomes, suggesting that gene family composition and chromosomal evolution are largely independent. The improved reference genome enhanced the analysis of transcriptomic and epigenomic datasets, enabling the discovery of new cell-type-specific gene markers. A publicly accessible genome browser was also developed, providing updated genomic resources for research in evolutionary biology, genomics, and developmental biology.
