= Transmembrane protein 151B =

Transmembrane protein

An Error has occurred retrieving Wikidata item for infobox Transmembrane protein 151B is a protein that in humans is encoded by the TMEM151B gene.

== Nomenclature ==
The Transmembrane protein 151B gene is also known as TMEM151B, C6orf137, and bA444E17.5.

== Gene ==
The gene is located on the positive strand of chromosome 6 at the location 6p21.1 from the chromosome position 44270450 to 44279444, for a total length of 8,995 base pairs. It is a complex locus that contains both TMEM151B and SPATS1. TMEM151B has one paralog: TMEM151A.

== Transcript ==
The mRNA contains 3 exons, with a transcribed mRNA length of 4911bp, and the coding region containing 1701bp.

Visualization of the TMEM151B gene. The green lines above the diagram show other promotors within the gene.

== Protein ==
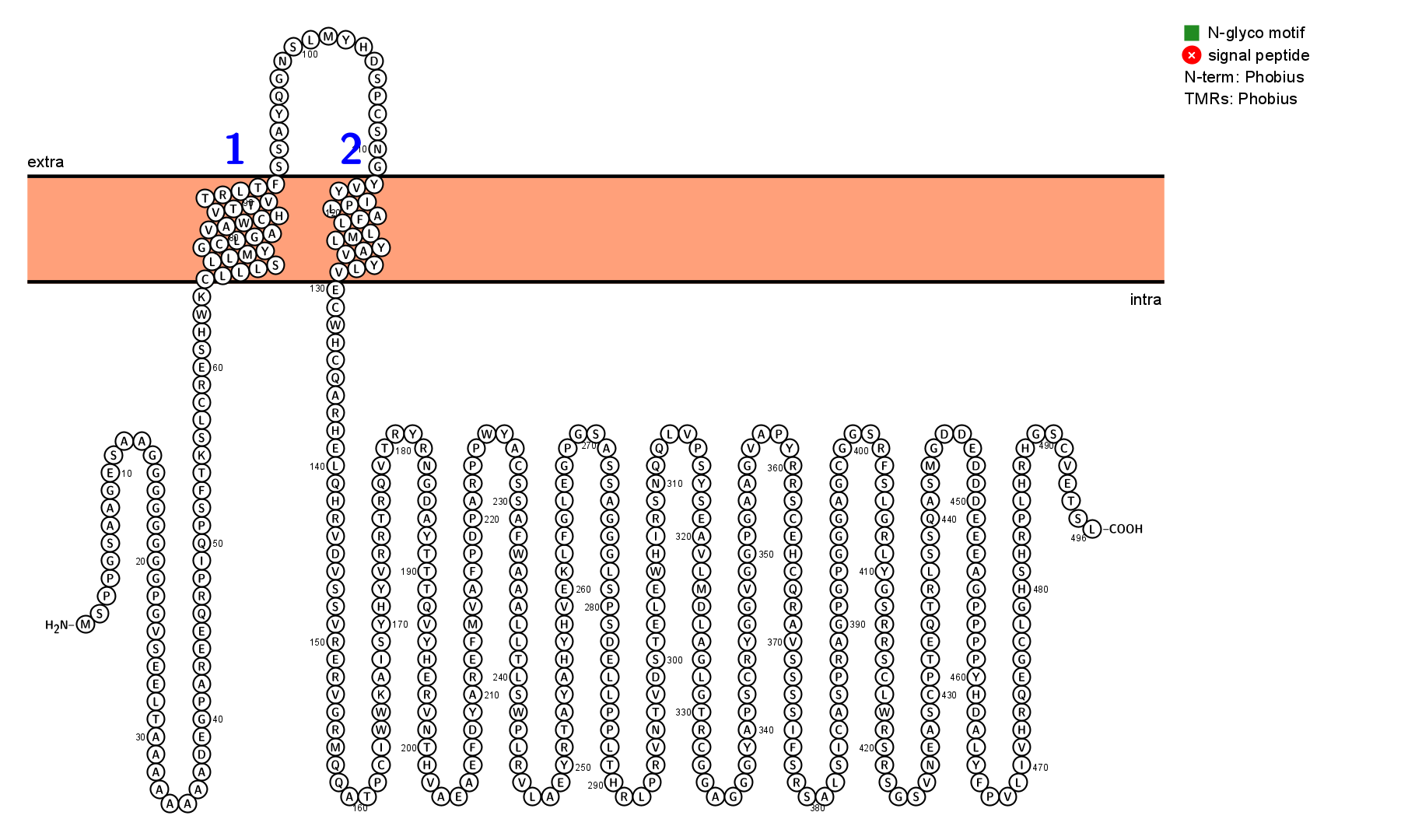
2D visualization of the TMEM151B protein using Protter.

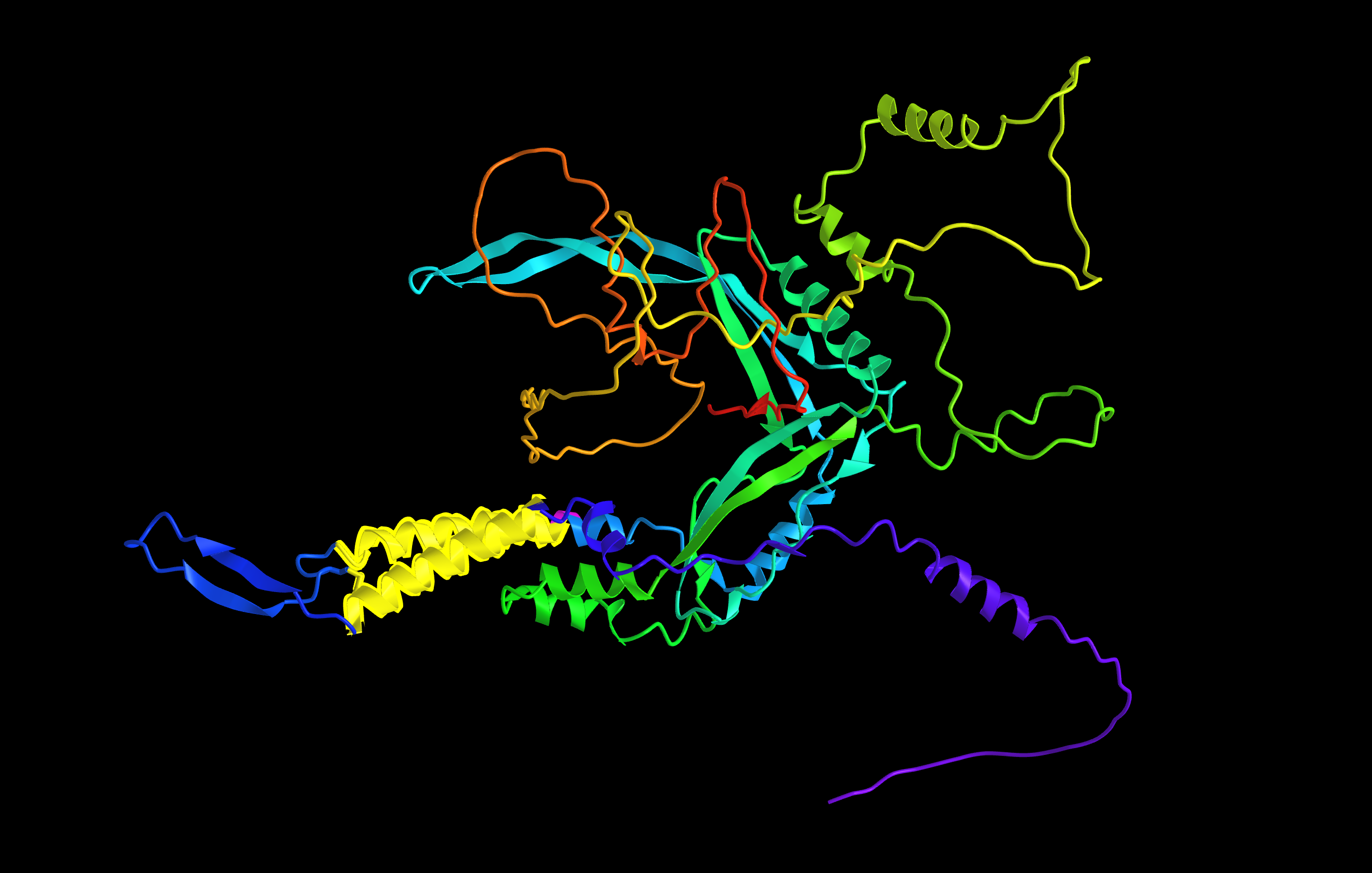
3D model of the TMEM151B protein using Alpha Fold.

The protein has a length of 566 amino acids and contains two transmembrane domains. According to Compute pI/Mw, molecular weight of approximately 61 kDa, which matches the weight listed on NCBI, and a theoretical isoelectric point of 6.72. The human TMEM151B protein composition is poor in lysine and arginine, lysine comprising 1.4% of the amino acids and arginine making up 0.8% of the total protein. The mouse ortholog is also arginine poor.

=== Expression ===
RNA expression map of TMEM151B within the mouse brain

RNA-seq gene expression profiling shows high expression in the brain, and notable expression in the testes. NCBI geo profiles similarly show localization to the brain tissues. Within the mouse brain, TMEM151B has high expression particularly within the cerebellum, medulla, and olfactory bulb according to the Allen Brain Atlas.

=== Protein interactions ===
The TMEM151B protein interacts with one other protein according to BioGRID.

- SREBF2- a transcription factor precursor which is imbedded in the endoplasmic reticulum membrane; activates genes involved with cholesterol biosynthesis.

== Homology and evolution ==
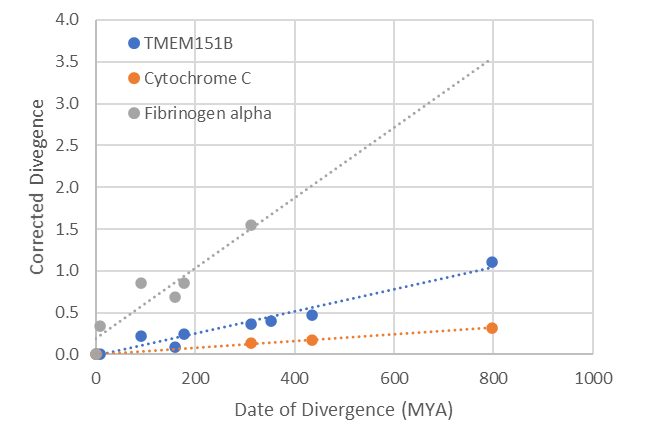
Evolutionary rate of TMEM151B compared to that of Fibrinogen Alpha Chain and Cytochrome C.

The TMEM151B gene is conserved within most vertebrates, and appears to be conserved within some invertebrates. Its paralog, TMEM151A, has a 47.7% sequence identity with TMEM151B. The evolution rate is relatively slow: between the rate of change in fibrinogen alpha and cytochrome c.

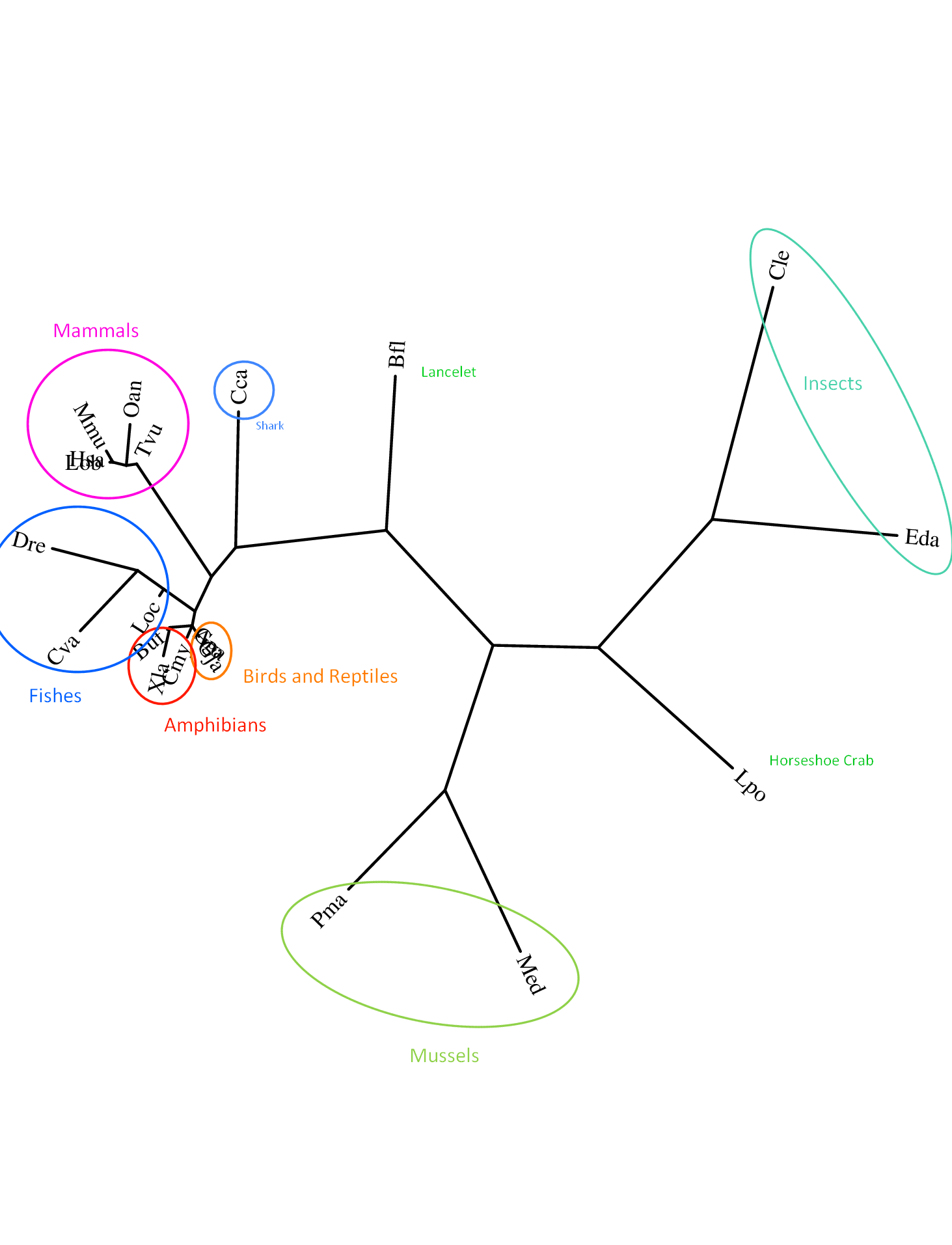
Ortholog space for TMEM151B

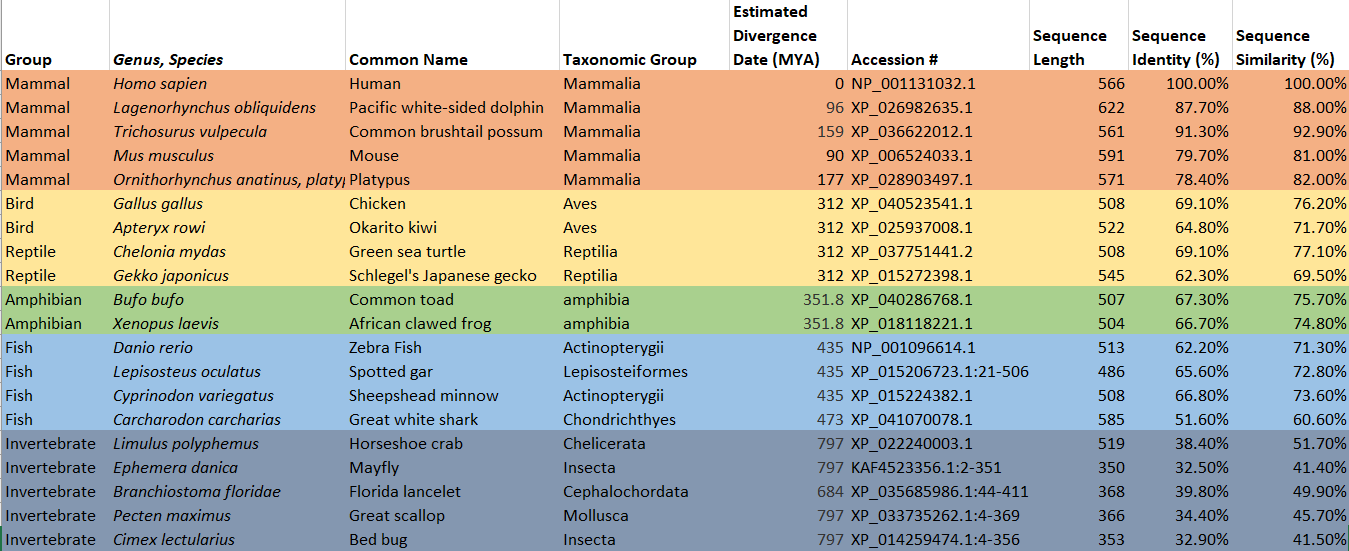
Table of orthologs for the TMEM151B gene, found using NCBI Blast

== Research ==
Alternative splicing of TMEM151B along with 4 other genes were linked to colorectal cancer. It was also found to be up-regulated in post-menopausal breast cancer. A SNP found within TMEM151B is associated with the development of lean muscle.
