= Transmembrane protein 179 =

Protein found in humans

TMEM179

Identifiers
- Aliases: TMEM179, C14orf90, TMEM179A, transmembrane protein 179
- External IDs: MGI: 2144891; GeneCards: TMEM179

Gene location (Human)
Chr.	Chromosome 14 (human)
Band	14q32.33	Start	104,474,678 bp
Band	14q32.33	End	104,605,647 bp

Gene location (Mouse)
Chr.	Chromosome 12 (mouse)
Band	12|12 F1	Start	112,466,623 bp
Band	12|12 F1	End	112,483,181 bp
RNA expression pattern
Bgee	Human / Mouse (ortholog); Top expressed in: hypothalamus; pituitary gland; nucleus accumbens; putamen; right frontal lobe; dorsolateral prefrontal cortex; Brodmann area 9; caudate nucleus; anterior cingulate cortex; anterior pituitary / Top expressed in: dorsomedial hypothalamic nucleus; dentate gyrus of hippocampal formation granule cell; visual cortex; primary visual cortex; superior frontal gyrus; ventromedial nucleus; anterior amygdaloid area; nucleus of stria terminalis; subiculum; central gray substance of midbrain; More reference expression data
BioGPS	n/a
Orthologs
Databases	NCBI: entry; OMA: entry
Species	Human	Mouse
Entrez	388021	104885
Ensembl	ENSG00000258986; ENSG00000276342	ENSMUSG00000054013
UniProt	Q6ZVK1	Q8BHH9
RefSeq (mRNA)	NM_001286389; NM_001286390; NM_207379	NM_178915
RefSeq (protein)	NP_001273318; NP_001273319	NP_849246
Location (UCSC)	Chr 14: 104.47 – 104.61 Mb	Chr 12: 112.47 – 112.48 Mb
PubMed search
- Wikidata
View/Edit Human	View/Edit Mouse

Transmembrane protein 179 is a protein that in humans is encoded by the TMEM179 gene. The function of transmembrane protein 179 is not yet well understood, but it is believed to have a function in the nervous system.

== Gene ==
In humans, TMEM179 is located on the long arm of chromosome 14 on the reverse strand and maps to 14q32.33 with the genomic sequence starting at 104,592,993 bp and ending at 104,604,983 bp. Alternative names for this gene are "C14orf90" and "FLJ42486" TMEM179 contains four exons.

== mRNA ==
There are four isoforms of the TMEM179 protein due to alternative splicing of the pre mRNA transcript.

== Protein ==
Transmembrane protein 179 is 233 amino acids long. Transmembrane protein 179 has a predicted molecular weight of 26 kDa and a predicted isoelectric point of 5. Both the Homo sapiens and Xenopus laevis proteins contain a much higher than normal level of phenylalanine, a higher than normal level of leucine and tryptophan, and a lower than normal level of proline compared to other proteins from their respective organisms. Both the human and frog proteins have the repetitive structure of "LAFL" appearing twice in their protein which suggests that this repetitive sequence may have some significance.

Isoform Name	Size (AA)	Exons used	Accession number
Transmembrane protein 179 Isoform 1	233	1,2,3,& 4	NP_001273318.1
Transmembrane protein 179 Isoform 2	174	1,2,& 3	NP_001273319.1
Transmembrane protein 179 Isoform 3	102	1	XP_011535048.1
Transmembrane protein 179 Isoform 4	131	2,3,& 4	XP_011535052.1

=== Subcellular location ===
Transmembrane protein 179 is predicted to be localized to the endoplasmic reticulum (ER).

=== Structure ===
Transmembrane protein 179 is predicted to have four transmembrane regions with the N-terminus located on the cytosol side of the membrane. The secondary structure of transmembrane protein 179 is predicted to be made up of mostly alpha helix (52.36%) with some regions of random coil (31.33%) and beta sheets (12.02%). transmembrane protein 179 is predicted to have two disulfide bridges, both located on the ER lumenal side of the membrane.

=== Post-translational modifications ===
Transmembrane protein 179 is predicted to undergo various post-translational modifications such as S-palmitoylation, N-glycosylation, Glycation, Phosphorylation, and O-Linked β-N-acetylglucosamine.

A cartoon of transmembrane protein 179 depicting the orientation and location of the post-translational modifications of the protein. The gray flags indicate the location of predicted post-translational modifications.

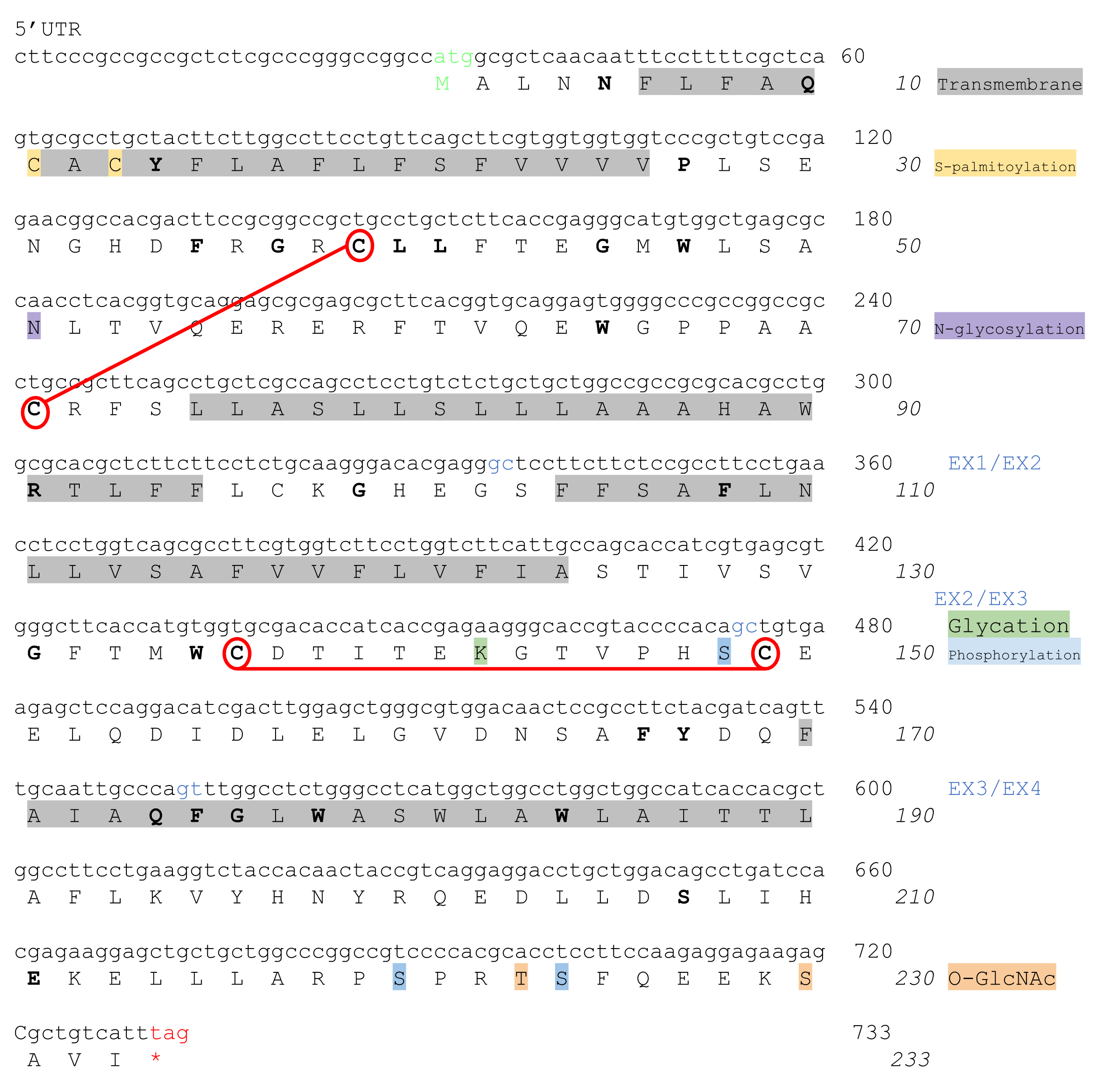
An annotated conceptual translation depicting the predicted post-translational modifications of transmembrane protein 179.

== Expression ==
=== Normal tissue expression ===
TMEM179 has been shown to be most highly expressed in brain and spinal cord tissue. The gene is also relatively highly expressed in tissues in the lungs, adrenal gland, and testis.

=== Abnormal tissue expression ===
TMEM179 has been shown to be relatively highly expressed in glioma cells. TMEM179 has also been shown to be expressed highly in some other cancer cell lines. It was most highly expressed in a small cell lung cancer cell line. It was also expressed in cancer cell lines originating from the brain, renal/urinary/male reproductive systems, and Breast/female reproductive system.

== Regulation of expression ==
The TMEM179 promoter was found to start at 104,604,641 bp and end at 104,606,647 bp on the reverse strand using Genomatix's Gene2Promoter tool. Genomatix's MatInspector tool found 732 predicted transcription factor binding sites for this promoter. Some transcription factors that are predicted to bind to the TMEM179 promoter that are of particular interest are EGR1—of which there are four predicted binding sites—and Neuron-Restrictive Silencer Factor (NRSF), both of which are involved in the regulation of neuron growth.

== Interacting proteins ==
Transmembrane protein 179 has no known protein interactions.

== Homology ==
=== Paralogs ===
There are no known paralogs of the TMEM179 gene.

=== Orthologs ===
Orthologs of TMEM179 have been found in animals as distantly related to humans as annelids and arthropods, but no orthologs have been found in more distantly related animals such as those in clades Porifera, Nematoda, and Cnidaria. No orthologs have been found in any nonanimal organisms.

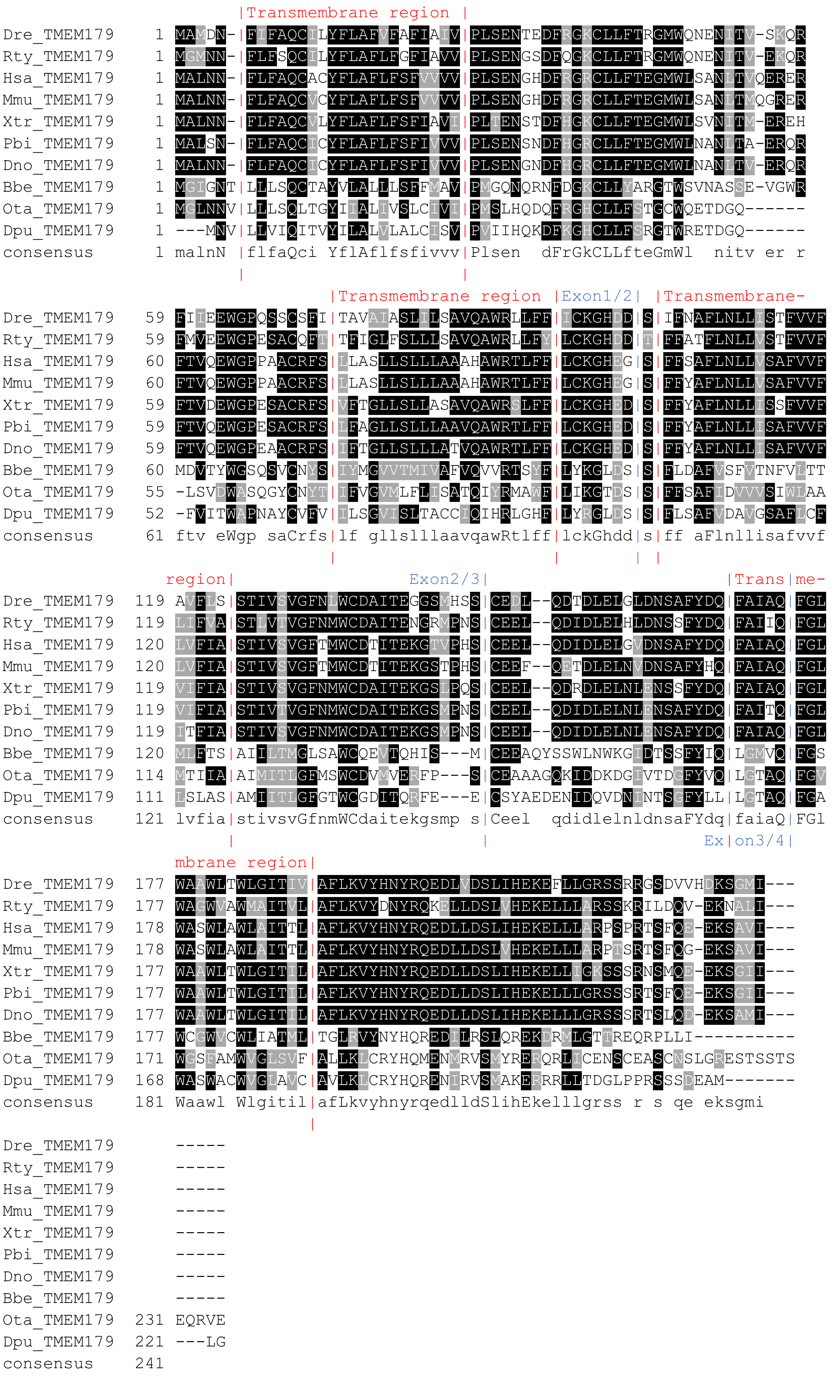
A multiple sequence alignment of orthologous transmembrane protein 179 sequences from various species. The sequences are named with the first letter of the organism's genus name followed by the first two letters of the species name (Homo sapiens is labelled Hsa_TMEM179). Amino acids that are shaded black are highly conserved. This multiple sequence alignment was made using Clustal Omega and Boxshade.

Table of TMEM179 Orthologs
Species	Taxonomic group	Median Time of Divergence From Homo sapiens (Millions of Years Ago)	Accession number	Sequence Identity to Homo sapiens (%)
Homo sapiens	Mammalia	0	NP_001273318.1	100
Mus musculus	Mammalia	88	NP_849246.2	94
Dromaius novaehollandiae	Aves	320	XP_025968310.1	84
Python bivittatus	Reptila	320	XP_007436683.1	83
Xenopus laevis	Amphibia	353	XP_018087798.1	76
Danio rerio	Actinopterygii	432	XP_003200427.1	66
Rhincodon typus	Chondrichthyes	465	XP_020385663.1	70
Branchiostoma belcheri	Chordata	699	XP_019647683.1	35
Biomphalaria glabrata	Mollusca	794	XP_013064109.1	38
Onthophagus taurus	Arthropoda	794	XP_022914672.1	33
Daphnia pulex	Arthropoda	794	EFX83970.1	33
Capitella teleta	Annelida	794	ELU12883.1	32

== Function ==
The function of transmembrane protein 179 is not yet well understood. TMEM179 has been identified in a patent involving the production of neural regenerating cells (NRCs) from marrow adherent stem cells (MASCs). According to this patent the methylation of CpG sequences in TMEM179 is decreased in NRCs compared to MASCs. This finding, coupled with the finding that TMEM179 is most highly expressed in the brain and spinal cord, provides strong evidence that transmembrane protein 179 plays a role in nervous system development. This function is also supported by the fact that no orthologs of TMEM179 have been found in nonanimal organisms or animals that lack a nervous system such as sea sponges.
