= QNG1 =

Protein-coding gene in the species Homo sapiens

Identifiers
- Aliases: QNG1, chromosome 9 open reading frame 64, C9orf64, Q-Nucleotide N-Glycosylase 1, Queuine Salvage Protein QNG1
- External IDs: OMIM: 611342; MGI: 1917403; GeneCards: QNG1

Gene location (Human)
Chr.	Chromosome 9 (human)
Band	9q21.32	Start	83,938,311 bp
Band	9q21.32	End	83,956,986 bp

Gene location (Mouse)
Chr.	Chromosome 13 (mouse)
Band	13|13 B1	Start	58,527,631 bp
Band	13|13 B1	End	58,533,039 bp
RNA expression pattern
Bgee	Human / Mouse (ortholog); Top expressed in: buccal mucosa cell; skin of arm; renal medulla; nipple; pylorus; cardia; trigeminal ganglion; sperm; ventral tegmental area; superior surface of tongue / Top expressed in: ileum; jejunum; intestinal villus; epithelium of small intestine; vestibular membrane of cochlear duct; endocardial cushion; Ileal epithelium; endothelial cell of lymphatic vessel; lacrimal gland; left colon; More reference expression data
BioGPS	n/a
Gene ontology
Molecular function	molecular function
Cellular component	cellular component
Biological process	tRNA modification; biological process; tRNA-guanine transglycosylation
Sources:Amigo / QuickGO
Orthologs
Databases	NCBI: entry; OMA: entry
Species	Human	Mouse
Entrez	84267	70153
Ensembl	ENSG00000165118	ENSMUSG00000021550
UniProt	Q5T6V5	G3X8U3
RefSeq (mRNA)	NM_032307; NM_001317997	NM_027335
RefSeq (protein)	NP_001304926; NP_115683	NP_081611
Location (UCSC)	Chr 9: 83.94 – 83.96 Mb	Chr 13: 58.53 – 58.53 Mb
PubMed search
- Wikidata
View/Edit Human	View/Edit Mouse

Queuosine 5'-phosphate N-glycosylase/hydrolase (also called queuosine salvage protein) is protein which in humans is encoded by the gene QNG1 (previously C9orf64).

== Gene ==
QNG1 is located on chromosome 9q21.32. The genes closest to QNG1 on the long arm of chromosome 9 include GKAP1, KIF27, HNRNPK, RMI1, and a MicroRNA MIR7-1.

== Tissue distribution ==
Expression of this gene is highest in the duodenum and small intestine, and it is also expressed in 24 other tissues.

== Structure ==
Queuosine salvage protein is 341 amino acids long with a molecular weight of 39,029 daltons and an isoelectric point of 5.61. The crystal structures of wild-type human QNG1 and QNG1 in complex with queuine have been deposited with the Protein Data Bank under accession numbers 7UGK and 8DL3.

== Function ==
The function and biological process of the queuosine salvage protein is a queuosine-nucleotide N-glycosylase/hydrolase (QNG1) that releases queuine from Q-5'-monophosphate, and this activity is required for the salvage of queuine from exogenous Queuosine by S. pombe and HeLa cells. Some evidence from orthologs indicates it may be involved in tRNA processing and recycling. The most common mRNA contains 4 coding exons, and it has 2 additional alternatively spliced exons. QNG1 has been found in 5 different splice variants.
