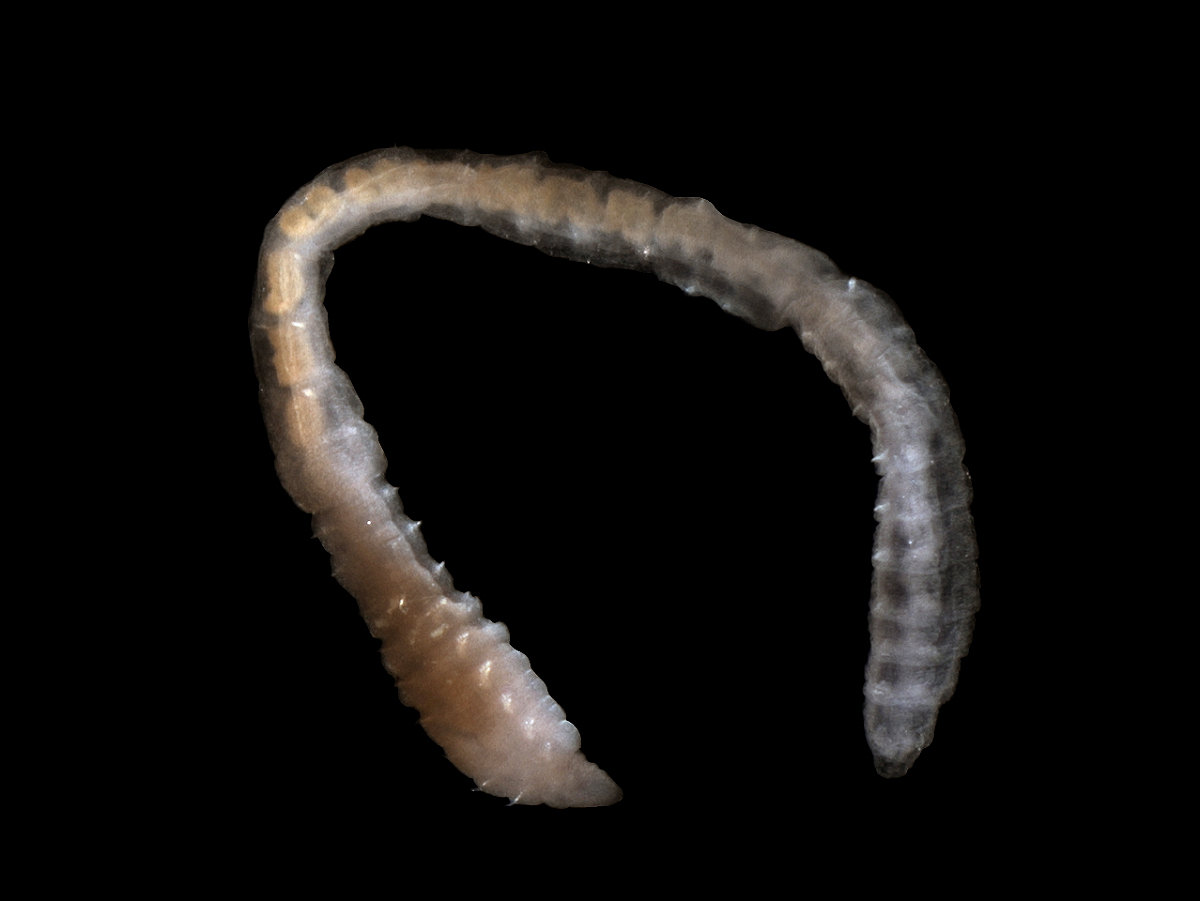
- Capitella capitata (Fabricius, 1780)

Scientific classification
- Kingdom: Animalia
- Phylum: Annelida
- Clade: Pleistoannelida
- Clade: Sedentaria
- Family: Capitellidae; Grube, 1862

Genera
- See text

= Capitellidae =

Family of annelids

Capitellidae is a polychaete worm family in the subclass Scolecida.

== Genera ==
There is a total of 46 genera:

- Abyssocapitella
- Amastigos
- Anotomastus
- Baldia
- Barantolla
- Branchiocapitella
- Capitella
- Capitellethus
- Capitobranchus
- Dasybranchetus
- Dasybranchus
- Decamastus
- Ditrocha
- Dodecaseta
- Eunotomastus
- Heteromastides
- Heteromastus
- Leiocapitella
- Leiocapitellides
- Leiochrides
- Leiochrus
- Lumbricomastus
- Mastobranchus
- Mediomastus
- Neoheteromastus
- Neomediomastus
- Neonotomastus
- Neopseudocapitella
- Nonatus
- Notodasus
- Notomastus
- Octocapitella
- Paracapitella
- Paraleiocapitella
- Parheteromastides
- Parheteromastus
- Peresiella
- Protomastobranchus
- Pseudocapitella
- Pseudoleiocapitella
- Pseudomastus
- Pseudonotomastus
- Pulliella
- Rashgua
- Scyphoproctus
- Undecimastus
