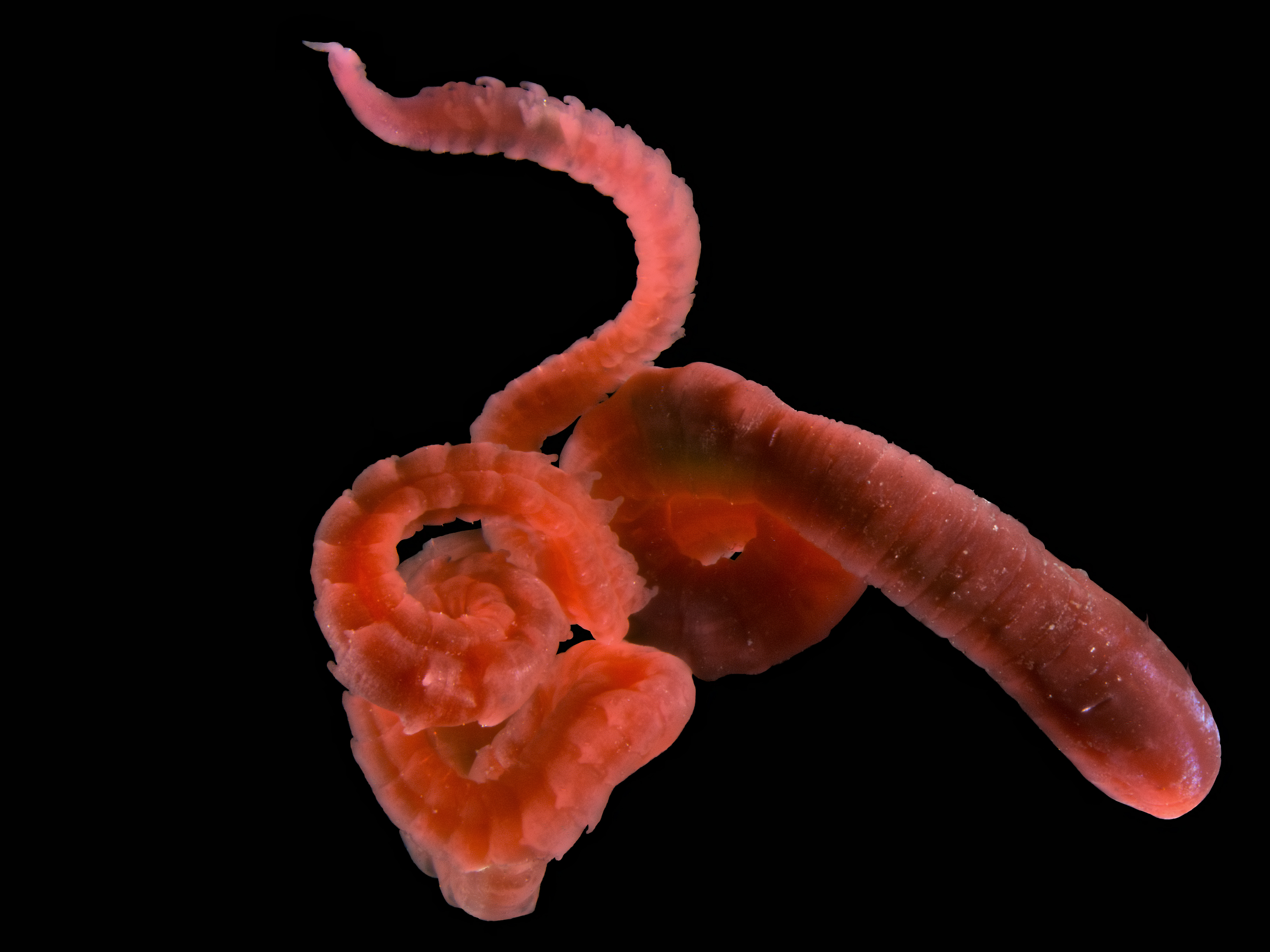
- Heteromastus filiformis

Scientific classification
- Domain: Eukaryota
- Kingdom: Animalia
- Phylum: Annelida
- Clade: Pleistoannelida
- Clade: Sedentaria
- Family: Capitellidae
- Genus: Heteromastus; Eisig, 1887

= Heteromastus =

Genus of annelid worms

Heteromastus is a genus of annelids belonging to the family Capitellidae.

The genus has cosmopolitan distribution.

Species:

- Heteromastus caudatus (Hartman, 1976)
- Heteromastus filiformis (Claparède, 1864)
- Heteromastus filobranchus Berkeley & Berkeley, 1932
- Heteromastus giganteus Zachs, 1933
- Heteromastus gusipoensis Jeong, Soh & Suh, 2019
- Heteromastus hutchingsae Green, 2002
- Heteromastus koreanus Jeong, Soh & Suh, 2019
- Heteromastus namhaensis Jeong, Soh & Suh, 2019
- Heteromastus similis Southern, 1921
- Heteromastus tohbaiensis Yabe & Mawatari, 1998
