= ZSCAN21 =

Protein-coding gene in the species Homo sapiens

Identifiers
- Aliases: ZSCAN21, NY-REN-21, ZNF38, Zipro1, zinc finger and SCAN domain containing 21
- External IDs: OMIM: 601261; MGI: 99182; GeneCards: ZSCAN21

Gene location (Human)
Chr.	Chromosome 7 (human)
Band	7q22.1	Start	100,049,774 bp
Band	7q22.1	End	100,065,040 bp

Gene location (Mouse)
Chr.	Chromosome 5 (mouse)
Band	5 G2|5 76.96 cM	Start	138,115,165 bp
Band	5 G2|5 76.96 cM	End	138,132,527 bp
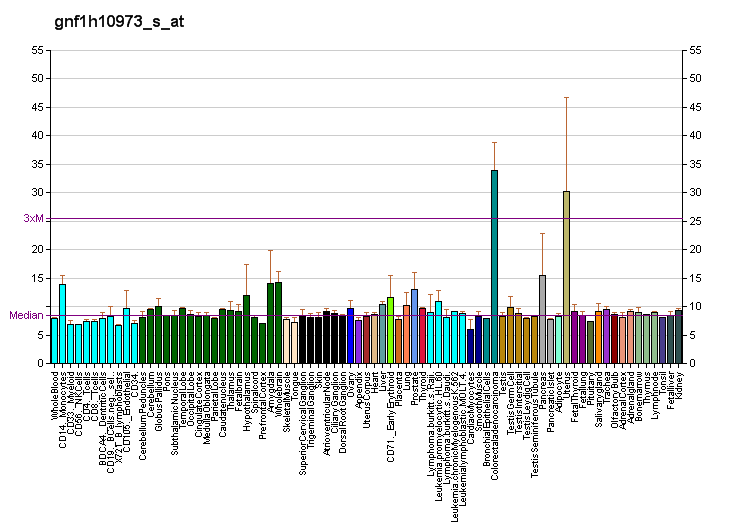
RNA expression pattern
Bgee	Human / Mouse (ortholog); Top expressed in: oocyte; secondary oocyte; gonad; parotid gland; ventricular zone; testicle; ganglionic eminence; endothelial cell; right uterine tube; gastrocnemius muscle / Top expressed in: otic vesicle; saccule; seminiferous tubule; Rostral migratory stream; medullary collecting duct; maxillary prominence; otic placode; fossa; ganglionic eminence; mandibular prominence; More reference expression data
BioGPS	More reference expression data
Gene ontology
Molecular function	DNA-binding transcription factor activity; RNA polymerase II cis-regulatory region sequence-specific DNA binding; DNA binding; DNA-binding transcription activator activity, RNA polymerase II-specific; protein binding; metal ion binding; nucleic acid binding; DNA-binding transcription factor activity, RNA polymerase II-specific
Cellular component	nucleus
Biological process	positive regulation of transcription, DNA-templated; regulation of transcription, DNA-templated; positive regulation of transcription by RNA polymerase II; transcription, DNA-templated; transcription by RNA polymerase II
Sources:Amigo / QuickGO
Orthologs
Databases	NCBI: entry; OMA: entry
Species	Human	Mouse
Entrez	7589	22697
Ensembl	ENSG00000166529	ENSMUSG00000037017
UniProt	Q9Y5A6	Q07231
RefSeq (mRNA)	NM_145914; NM_001362779; NM_001362780; NM_001362781	NM_001044703; NM_001044704; NM_001044705; NM_011757
RefSeq (protein)	NP_666019; NP_001349708; NP_001349709; NP_001349710	NP_001038168; NP_001038169; NP_001038170; NP_035887
Location (UCSC)	Chr 7: 100.05 – 100.07 Mb	Chr 5: 138.12 – 138.13 Mb
PubMed search
- Wikidata
View/Edit Human	View/Edit Mouse

Zinc finger and SCAN domain-containing protein 21 is a protein that in humans is encoded by the ZSCAN21 gene.
