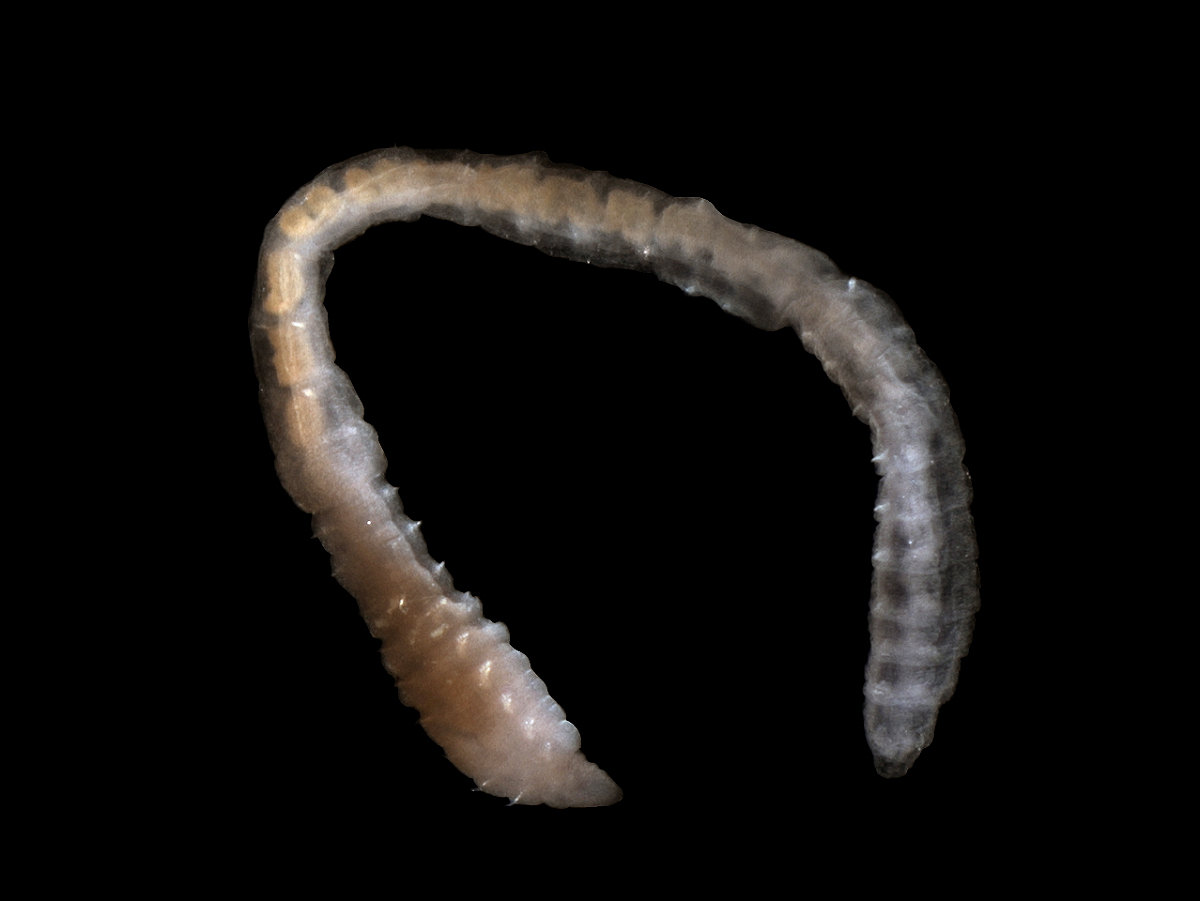

Scientific classification
- Domain: Eukaryota
- Kingdom: Animalia
- Phylum: Annelida
- Clade: Pleistoannelida
- Clade: Sedentaria
- Family: Capitellidae
- Genus: Capitella
- Species: C. capitata

Binomial name
- Capitella capitata (Fabricius, 1780)

= Capitella capitata =

Species of annelid

Capitella capitata is a polychaete worm that grows up to 10 cm in length. It is often blood-red in colour. The species is sedentary and fragile, with a flexible body.

Capitella capitata occurs on muddy sand, gritty sand, fine sand or rich mud on the lower shore to sub-littoral. It may be found under pebbles or small stones, with the burrows at or near the surface of the sediment.

It is an opportunistic species tolerant of stressful conditions, and often found in polluted waters (sewer discharges, hydrocarbons, metals ...) where it out-competes less tolerant species. A large abundance of C. capitata can be seen as an indication of polluted waters.

Capitella capitata is able to vary its reproductive strategy in accordance with its current environmental conditions. If local conditions are favorable, it can produce benthic larvae facilitating quick exploitation of local concentrations of organic matter. In contrast, C. capitata can produce planktonic larvae if there is a need to discover new habitats.
