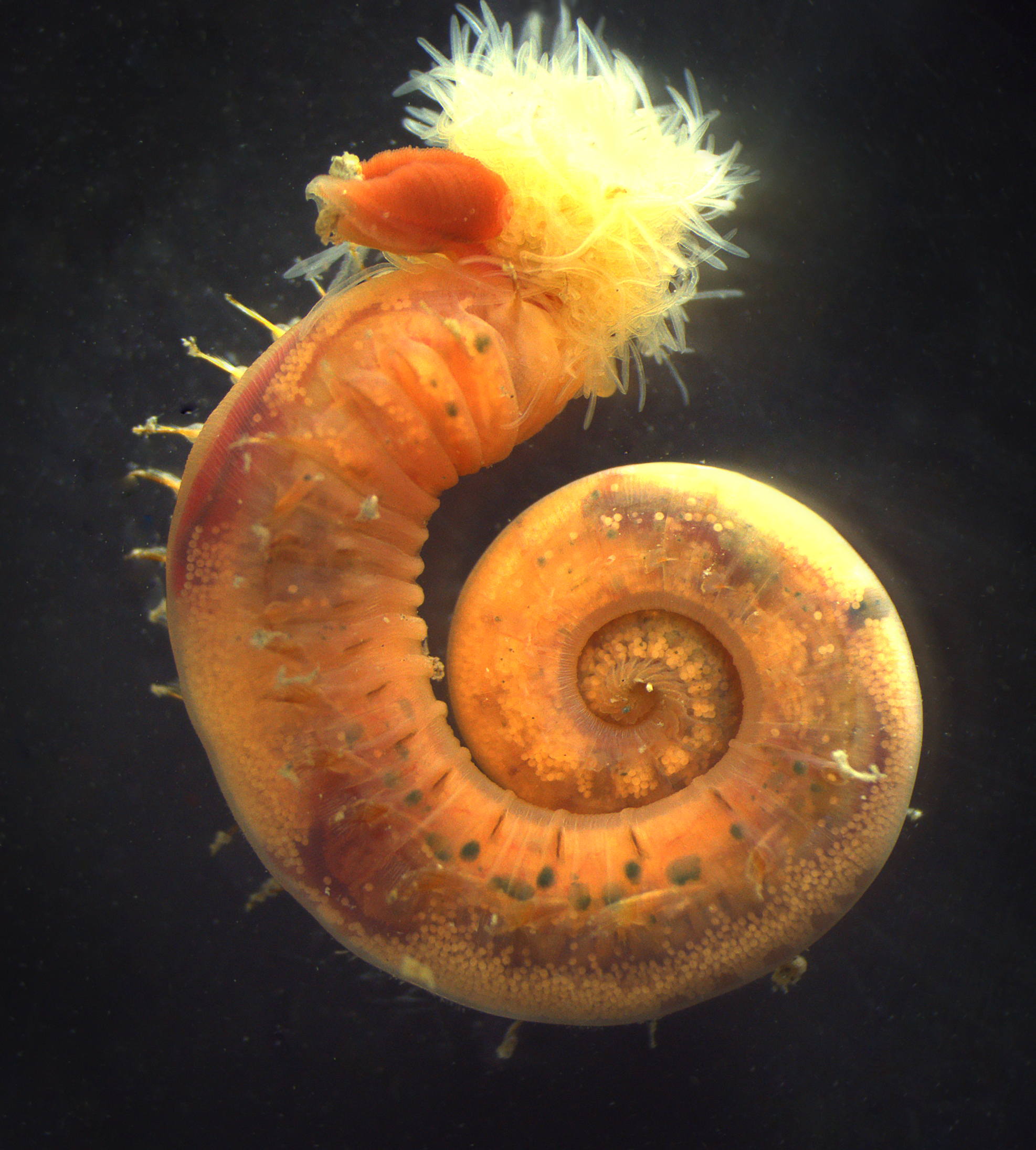
- Terebellides horikoshii

Scientific classification
- Kingdom: Animalia
- Phylum: Annelida
- Clade: Pleistoannelida
- Clade: Sedentaria
- Order: Terebellida
- Suborder: Terebelliformia
- Family: Trichobranchidae
- Genus: Terebellides; M. Sars, 1835

Type species
- Terebellides stroemii Sars, 1835

Synonyms
- Ampharetides Ehlers, 1913 (subjective synonym); Aponobranchus Gravier, 1905 (subjective synonym); Canephorus Erichson, 1846 (alternate spelling of Corephorus, a subjective synonym); Corephorus Grube, 1846 (subjective synonym); Unobranchus Hartman, 1965 (subjective synonym)

= Terebellides =

Genus of annelids

Terebellides is a genus of polychaete worms in the family Trichobranchidae. They were first examined in 1984 by Susan J. Williams and were once thought to be found across oceans world-wide as a species with cosmopolitan distribution. The specimens first examined were located in the Eastern Pacific. In 2022, there was a shift of focus to study them in the Atlantic Ocean, due to their complex DNA. Their geographic distribution emphasizes differences in nephridia size, the first characteristic identified in Atlantic Ocean specimens. This finding demonstrated the importance of comparing Atlantic taxa with those from the eastern Pacific. Later research focused on a third stomach region that lacks certain internal anatomical characteristics found in other taxa.

== Known species ==
- Terebellides abyssalis Hartman, 1965
- Terebellides akares Hutchings, Nogueira, and Carrerette, 2015
- Terebellides anguicomus Müller, 1858
- Terebellides atlantis Williams, 1984
- Terebellides bakkeni Parapar, Capa, Nygren, and Moreira, 2020
- Terebellides baliensis Hsueh and Li, 2017
- Terebellides banalis Schüller and Hutchings, 2012
- Terebellides biaciculata Hartmann-Schröder, 1992
- Terebellides bigeniculatus Parapar, Moreira, and Helgason, 2011
- Terebellides bisetosa Hartmann-Schröder, 1965
- Terebellides brevis Imajima and Williams, 1985
- Terebellides bulbosa Schüller and Hutchings, 2012
- Terebellides californica Williams, 1984
- Terebellides carmenensis Solis-Weiss, Fauchald, and Blankensteyn, 1991
- Terebellides concertina Schüller and Hutchings, 2012
- Terebellides distincta Williams, 1984
- Terebellides diva Schüller and Hutchings, 2012
- Terebellides ehlersi McIntosh, 1885
- Terebellides eurystethus Chamberlin, 1919
- Terebellides gingko Schüller and Hutchings, 2012
- Terebellides gracilis Malm, 1874
- Terebellides horikoshii Imajima and Williams, 1985
- Terebellides hutchingsae Parapar, Moreira, and Martin, 2016
- Terebellides intoshi Caullery, 1915
- Terebellides irinae Gagaev, 2009
- Terebellides japonica Moore, 1903
- Terebellides jitu Schüller and Hutchings, 2010
- Terebellides jorgeni Hutchings, 2007
- Terebellides kerguelensis McIntosh, 1885
- Terebellides klemani Kinberg, 1866
- Terebellides kobei Hessle, 1917
- Terebellides kongsrudi Parapar, Capa, Nygren, and Moreira, 2020
- Terebellides koreni Hansen, 1882
- Terebellides kowinka Hutchings and Peart, 2000
- Terebellides lanai Solis-Weiss, Fauchald, and Blankensteyn, 1991
- Terebellides lineata Imajima and Williams, 1985
- Terebellides lobatus Hartman and Fauchald, 1971
- Terebellides longicaudatus Hessle, 1917
- Terebellides malvinensis Bremec and Elias, 1999
- Terebellides mediterranea Parapar, Mikac, and Fiege, 2013
- Terebellides moorei Hessle, 1917
- Terebellides mundora Hutchings and Peart, 2000
- Terebellides narribri Hutchings and Peart, 2000
- Terebellides norvegica Parapar, Capa, Nygren, and Moreira, 2020
- Terebellides pacifica Kinberg, 1866
- Terebellides parvus Solis-Weiss, Fauchald, and Blankensteyn, 1991
- Terebellides paulina Grube, 1872
- Terebellides persiae Parapar, Moreira, Gil, and Martin, 2016
- Terebellides reishi Williams, 1984
- Terebellides ronningae Parapar, Capa, Nygren, and Moreira, 2020
- Terebellides scotica Parapar, Capa, Nygren, and Moreira, 2020
- Terebellides sepultura Garraffoni and Lana, 2003
- Terebellides shetlandica Parapar, Moreira, and O'Reilly, 2016
- Terebellides sieboldi Kinberg, 1866
- Terebellides strepsibranchis Grube, 1871
- Terebellides stroemii Sars, 1835
- Terebellides totae Bremec and Elias, 1999
- Terebellides umbella Grube, 1870
- Terebellides vanhoeffeni Ehlers, 1913
- Terebellides woolawa Hutchings and Peart, 2000

Terebellides sepultura is named after the Brazilian heavy metal band Sepultura.

== Physiology ==
Terebellides are typically distinguished by their pale brown color. Developmental research on their known physiological features led to further discoveries. Several elements were noted in their stomach makeup and internal anatomy, with their proportionate stomachs connecting them to related species. They have two to five lamellate lobes in their digestive systems. A specific characteristic of their anatomy is the single mid-dorsal branchia. They have a visible presence of eggs throughout the wall of their body. These worms are elongated and taper downwards with their ending segments being crowded and shorter in comparison. They have grooved tentacles around their head region, or prostomium, that aid in feeding and locomotion. The prostomium includes a lip-like structure that moves food to the cilia and into their mouth. They also have an abdomen, and a thorax that contains 18 pairs of notopodia.

== Feeding ==
These worms are bottom feeding detritivores that use their tentacles to obtain food particles from the surface of the ocean and from sediment. Mucus present on their tentacles helps them to trap food. They transfer food to a lip-like structure and move it into the mouth by the cilia. They reach out from their burrows with their tentacles and grasp onto nearby food in the benthic region of the oceans. A study of their digestive system focused on their digestive process and how their bodies break down ingested food.

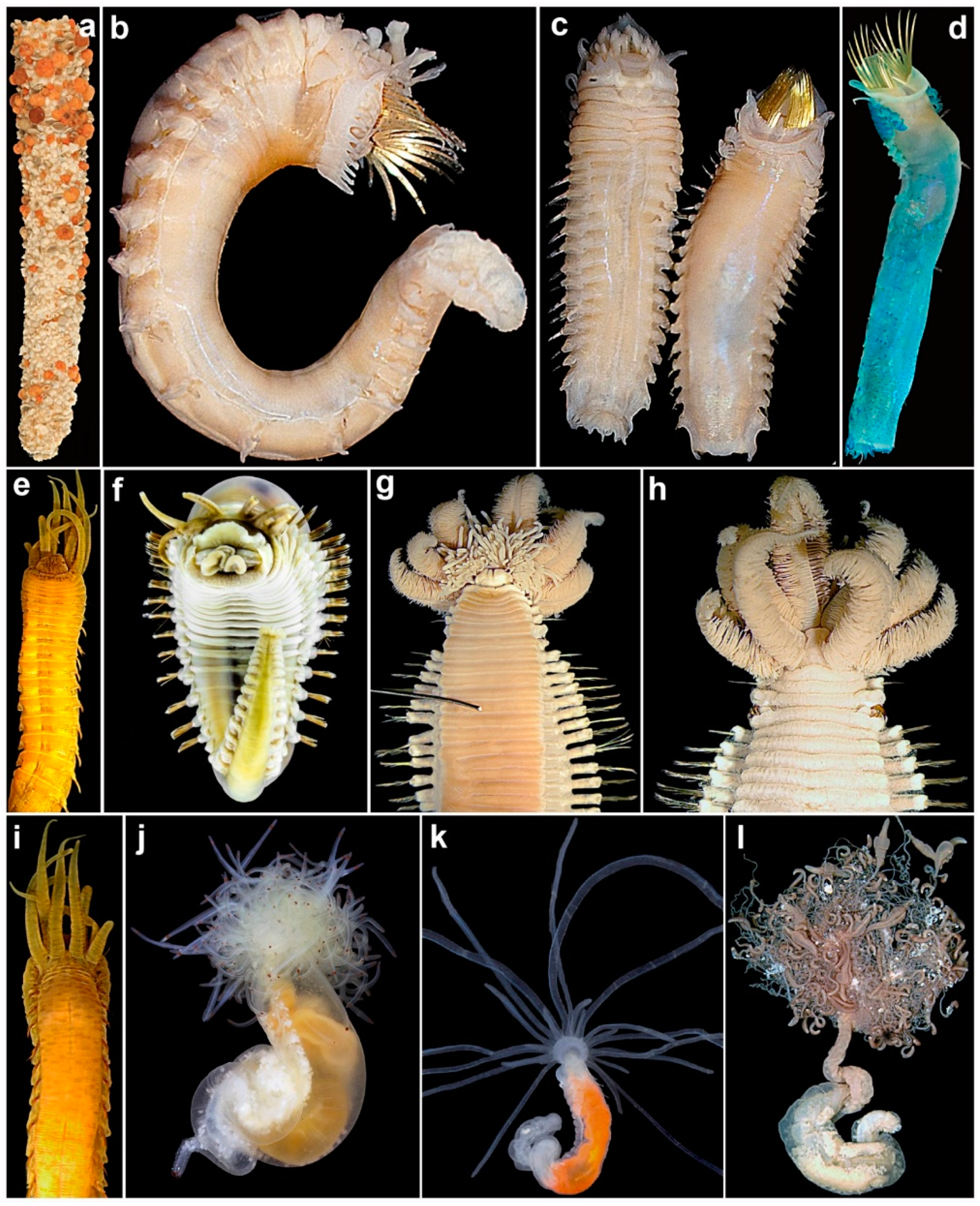
Depiction of their feeding process.

== Movement ==
Terebellides have been noted to move along the Norwegian and Swedish continental shelf. They are sedentary and live within burrows in the benthic zone. They will rise to the surface to forage when necessary. They don't tend to leave their burrows and move only to obtain food and survive. Some species have limited movement abilities, specifically when disturbed. Their primary means of transportation are ocean currents, as they are not able to move their bodies sufficiently on their own. They also rely on these currents to disperse planktonic larvae.

== Life cycle ==
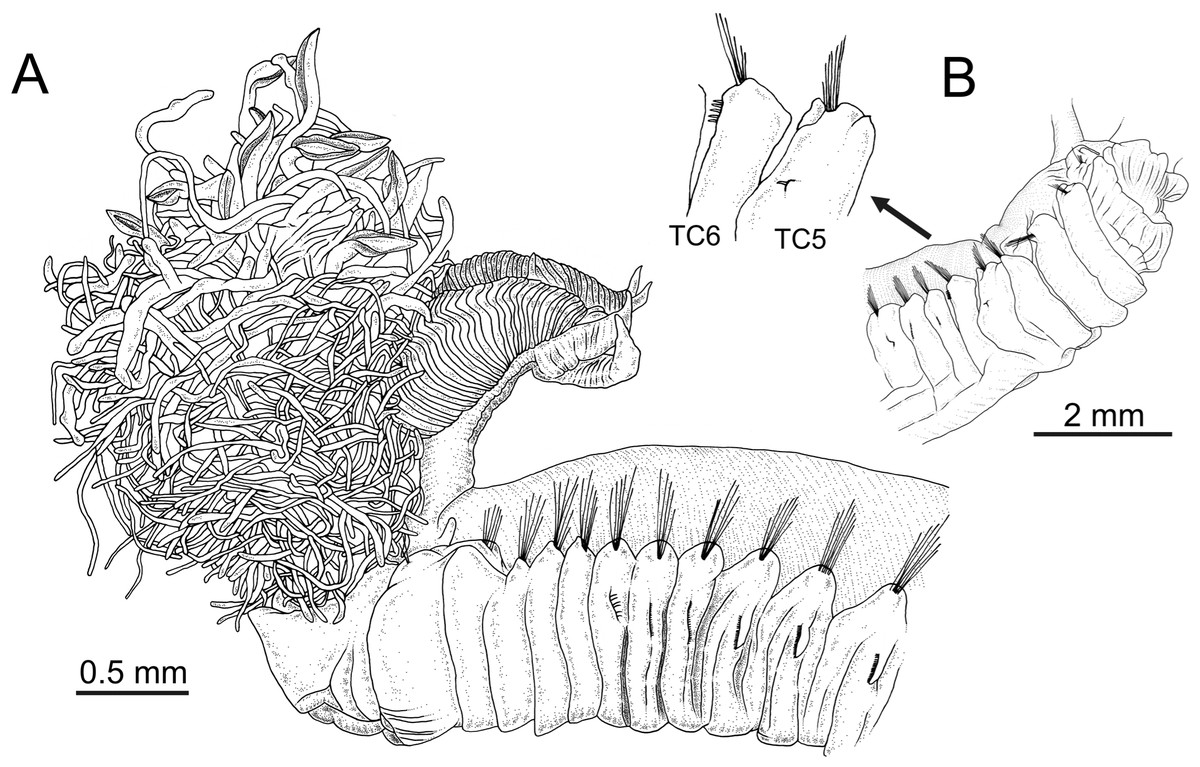
Life cycle of this invertebrate.

Most of these worms start in planktonic larval stages, commonly known as planktotrophy, and grow into their adult stages. The planktonic larval stage is spent in open water where the marine worms feed and develop in the water column. As the larvae metamorphose into adults, they develop the segments used for feeding and begin to settle to the bottom of the ocean within the benthic region for the remainder of their lifecycle. As they grow into their final adult stage, they become more sedentary and reside in the burrows.

Some species have no larval form and go straight to the adult stage. This direct development stage involves parental care, an uncommon trait among invertebrates. Female worms lay their eggs in capsules inside of their burrows. Depending on the growth stage, the young worms may attach to the parent's body as they continue to grow throughout their lifecycle.

== Ecology ==
Terebellides play an important role in their benthic ecosystems. They have adapted to living in the harsh environments of hydrothermal vents, burrows, and cold seeps, which can range from near-freezing temperatures to surpassing 574 degrees Fahrenheit. The worms have a symbiotic relationship with bacteria that live within the worm burrows on the ocean floor. These bacteria produce energy through chemosynthesis, where they convert hydrogen sulfide into organic compounds. This process provides a shared food source in the nutrient deficient benthic regions of the ocean.
