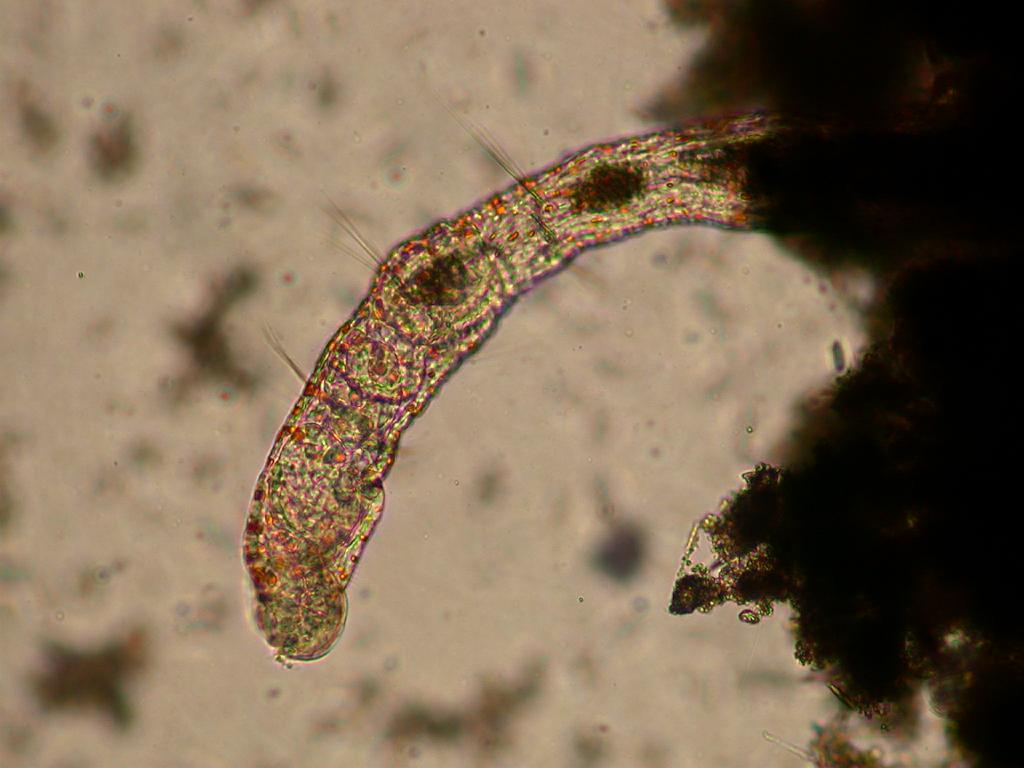

Scientific classification
- Kingdom: Animalia
- Phylum: Annelida
- Clade: Pleistoannelida
- Clade: Sedentaria
- Family: Aeolosomatidae
- Genus: Aeolosoma
- Species: A. hemprichi

Binomial name
- Aeolosoma hemprichi Ehrenberg, 1828

= Aeolosoma hemprichi =

Species of annelid

Aeolosoma hemprichi is an aquatic annelid and the smallest known species of the family Aeolosomatidae. It is found in freshwater environments in various parts of the world.

== Morphology ==
Aeolosoma hemprichi reaches a maximum length of 1.5 − 2mm. It has a large round prostomium with a ciliated ventral surface. It is covered in bristles (chaetae) which aid in locomotion. A. hemprichi is mostly transparent but has reddish brown spots; these are due to the presence of oil droplets in the epidermis.

The mouth is located on the side of the body. The mouth and esophagus are ciliated. There are two nuchal organs between the prostomium and peristomium. A. hemprichi also has epidermal sensory cells and ciliary sense organs.

== Ecology ==
Aeolosoma hemprichi is found mainly in limnetic freshwater ecosystems. It is a detritus feeder which ingests soil particles and feeds on the attached microbial films. It has been observed using its body to compact detritus into pellets, which it then consumes. A. hemprichi has also been observed preying upon rotifers and diplostracans.

== Reproduction ==
Aeolosoma hemprichi is hermaphroditic, though it does not appear to produce eggs and sperm simultaneously. It more often reproduces asexually by budding. The young annelids grow from the posterior portion of a parent; this may occur so rapidly that chains consisting of multiple generations are formed.

== Description ==
Aeolosoma hemprichi was first described in 1828 by the German biologist Christian Gottfried Ehrenberg in his Symbolae physicae, a joint project with the German naturalist Wilhelm Friedrich Hemprich.

== Scientific and commercial interest ==
Aeolosoma hemprichi has been studied for its potential in bioremdiation due to its ability to consume biological sludge produced in wastewater treatment.

A. hemprichi has 2n = 60 chromosomes, around twice as many as the proposed 32-36 chromosomes of ancestral annelids; this suggests that tetraploidy (chromosomal duplication) may have occurred at some point in the speciation history of the organism.
