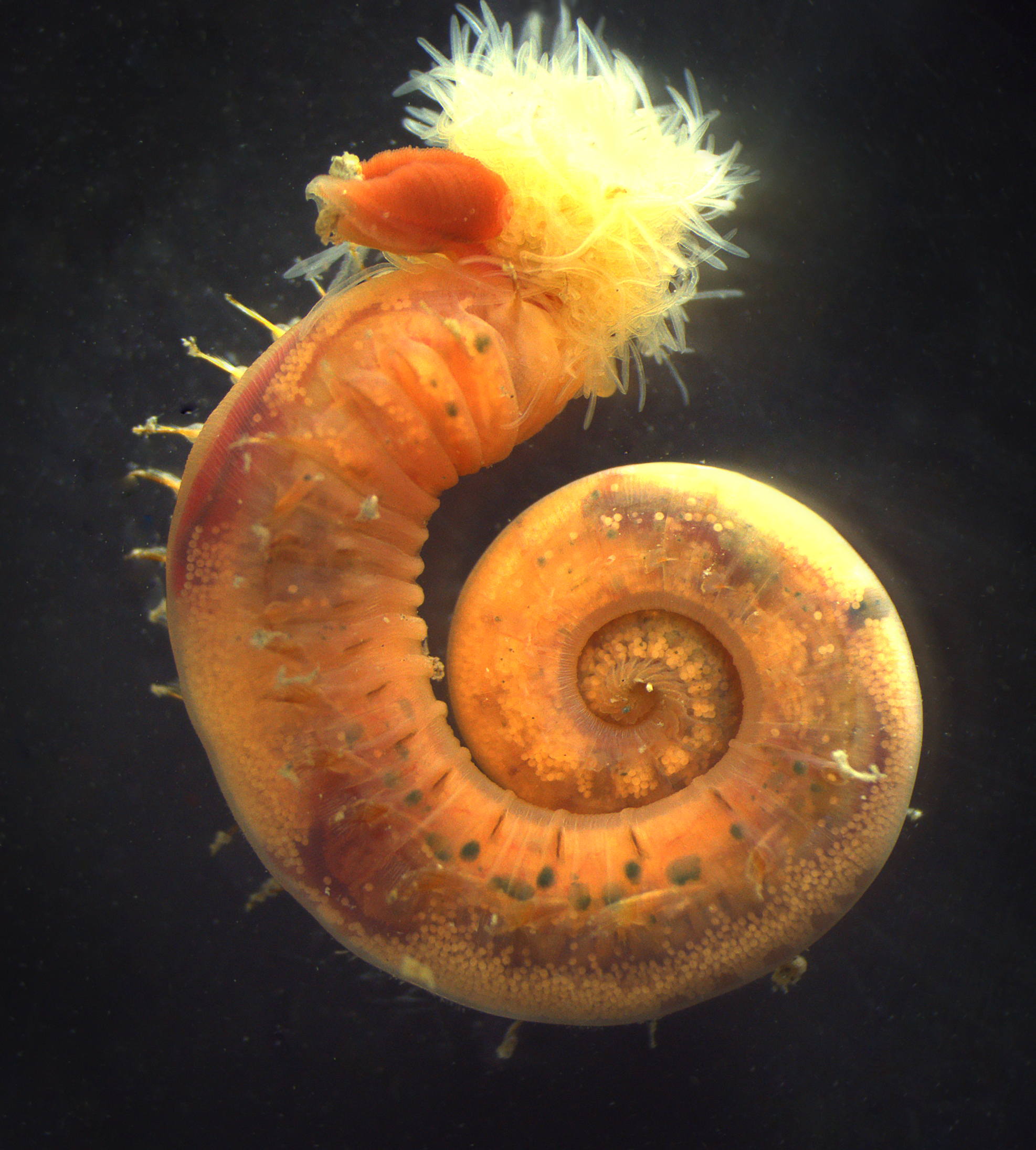

Scientific classification
- Kingdom: Animalia
- Phylum: Annelida
- Clade: Pleistoannelida
- Clade: Sedentaria
- Family: Trichobranchidae
- Genus: Terebellides
- Species: T. stroemii

Binomial name
- Terebellides stroemii M. Sars, 1835

Synonyms
- Corephorus elegans Grube, 1846

= Terebellides stroemii =

Species of annelid

Terebellides stroemii is a species of polychaete worms in the family Trichobranchidae.
