= Hystricosoma =

Scientific classification
- Kingdom: Animalia
- Phylum: Annelida
- Clade: Pleistoannelida
- Clade: Sedentaria
- Family: Aeolosomatidae
- Genus: Hystricosoma; Michaelsen, 1926

Genus of annelid worms

Hystricosoma is a genus of annelids belonging to the family Aeolosomatidae.

The species of this genus are found in Europe.

Species:

- Hystricosoma chappuisi Michaelsen, 1926
- Hystricosoma insularum Michaelsen, 1933
- Hystricosoma pictum (Schmarda, 1861)
