= Aeolosoma =

- Aeolosoma foraging for food

Scientific classification
- Kingdom: Animalia
- Phylum: Annelida
- Class: Polychaeta
- Order: incertae sedis
- Family: Aeolosomatidae
- Genus: Aeolosoma; Ehrenberg, 1828

Genus of annelids

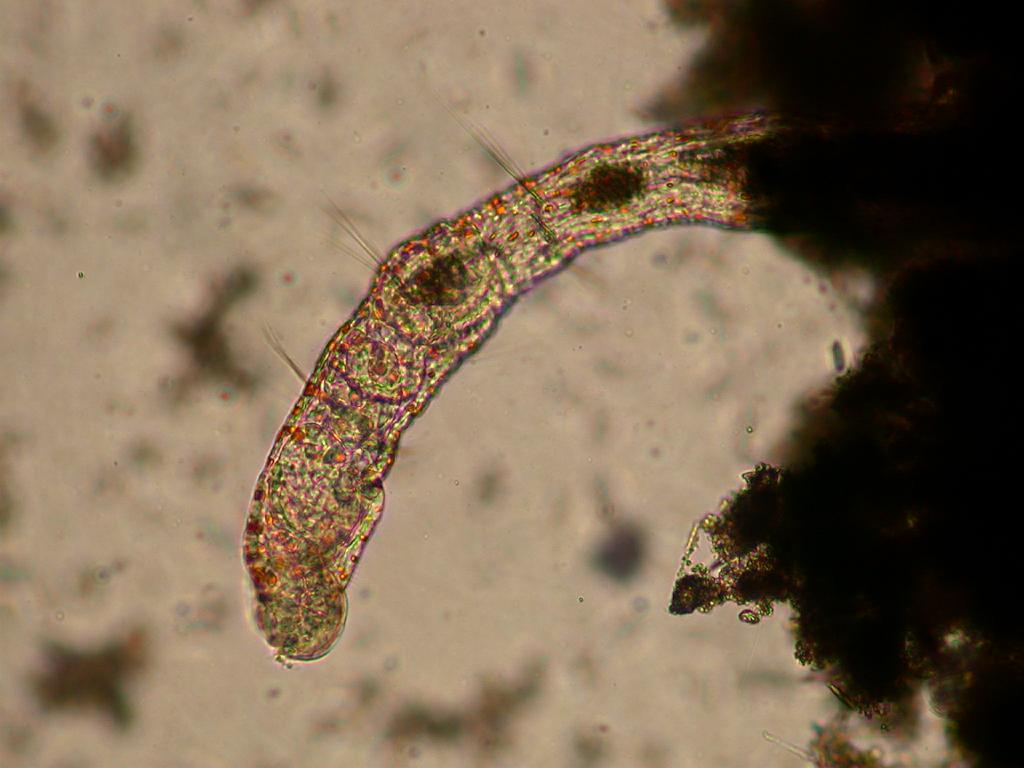
Aeolosoma hemprichi under a microscope

Aeolosoma is a genus of minute annelid worms, variously attributed either to oligochaetes or polychaetes. Unlike most polychaetes, they reside in freshwater environments in various parts of the world.

Aeolosoma usually reproduce asexually. This is done by paratomy or Fragmentation (reproduction), when the posterior segments are separated from the parent worm. It starts when the worm reaches a certain number of millimeters (depending on the species). Only one species, Aeolosoma singulare, is known to reproduce sexually.

Aeolosoma feed on microalgae, microorganisms and detritus. Their mouth acts like a small vacuum cleaner, which helps them suck up their food into their system.

== Morphology ==
Aeolosoma are transparent worms, very thin and of the length of 1.5–2 millimetres, although some can reach up to 5 millimetres. Their bodies are transparent and segmented, usually comprising around 17 segments. Each segment, except for the first, consists of bundles of bristle-like structures known as setae or chaetae, which aid in locomotion.

The Prostomium (head region) is broader than the subsequent segments and is equipped with ventral cilia that facilitate movement and feeding, Notably, Aeolosoma lacks appendages on the head and parapodia (lateral outgrowths) found in some other annelids. The integument contains pigmented epidermal glands filled with coloured oil droplets, which can be red, yellow, green, or occasionally colourless, giving the worms a distinctive hue.

Aeolosoma exhibits a high capacity for regeneration, with some species capable of regrowing both anterior and posterior segments within a week after amputation.

== Habitat and Distribution ==
Aeolosoma species are predominantly found in freshwater environments, including streams, rivers, lakes, and other water bodies rich in organic matter. They inhabit sediments, often residing among aquatic plants and detritus-rich sands. For example, Aeolosoma gertae is commonly found in fish ponds, rivers, lakes, and other freshwater bodies in Bangladesh.

Geographically, Aeolosoma species have a cosmopolitan distribution, occurring in various regions worldwide. They were discovered in alpine habitats in Europe, specifically near Italy, while also occurring in water systems in New York. Their widespread presence and distribution is attributed to their small size, reproductive strategies, and ability to inhabit diverse environments, including sediments rich in organic matter.

== Species ==
Below is a list of species in the genus Aeolosoma.

- Aeolosoma beddardi
- Aeolosoma evelinae
- Aeolosoma gertae
- Aeolosoma headleyi
- Aeolosoma hemprichi
- Aeolosoma hyalinum
- Aeolosoma leidyi
- Aeolosoma niveum
- Aeolosoma tenebrarum
- Aeolosoma travancorense
- Aeolosoma variegatum

== Gallery ==
Aeolosoma hemprichi Video

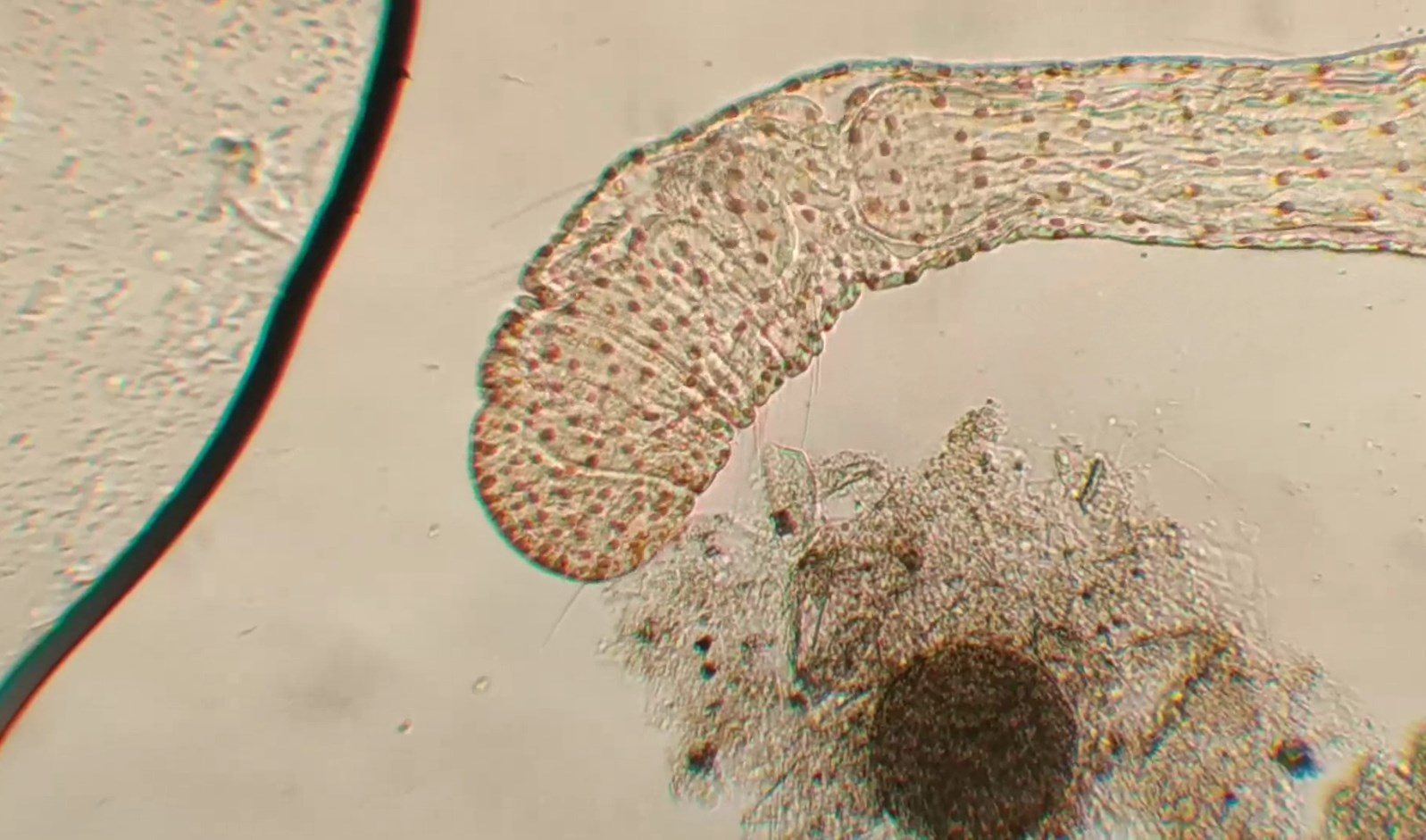
Aeolosoma hemprichi Photo

Aeolosoma hemprichi Video
