= Rheomorpha =

Scientific classification
- Kingdom: Animalia
- Phylum: Annelida
- Class: Polychaeta
- Order: incertae sedis
- Family: Aeolosomatidae
- Genus: Rheomorpha; Ruttner-Kolisko, 1955
- Species: R. neizvestnovae

Binomial name
- Rheomorpha neizvestnovae (Lastochkin, 1935)

Synonyms
- Genus synonymy: Lastockinia Naidu, 1961; Species synonymy: Aeolosoma neizvestnovi Lastochkin, 1935; Lastockinia niezvestnovae (Lastockin, 1935)

Genus of annelid worms

Rheomorpha is a genus of freshwater annelids belonging to the family Aeolosomatidae. Its only species is Rheomorpha neizvestnovae.
