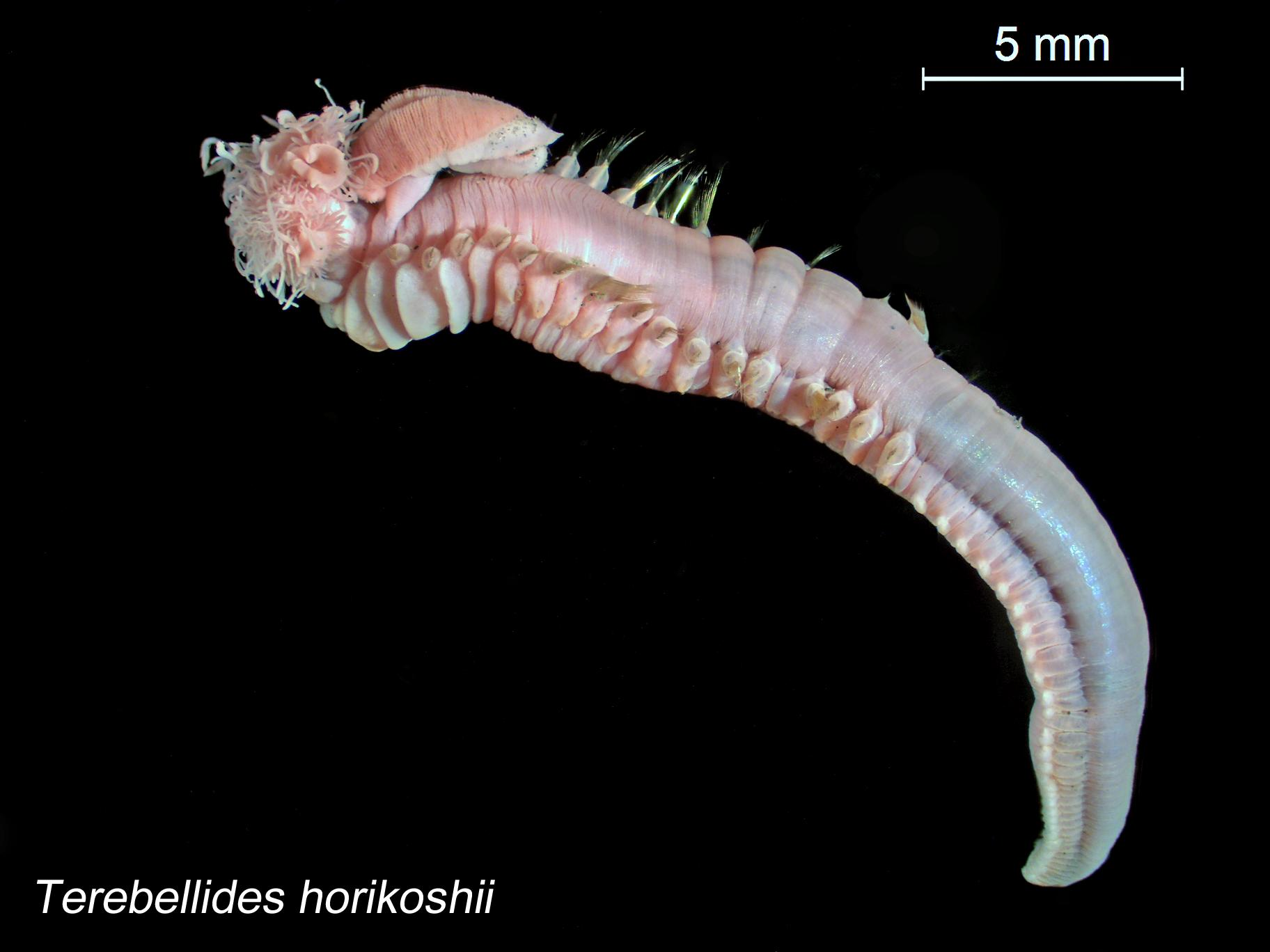

Scientific classification
- Kingdom: Animalia
- Phylum: Annelida
- Clade: Pleistoannelida
- Clade: Sedentaria
- Order: Terebellida
- Suborder: Terebelliformia
- Family: Trichobranchidae; Malmgren, 1866

= Trichobranchidae =

Family of annelids

Trichobranchidae is a family of annelids in the order Terebellida.

== Genera ==
- Octobranchus Marion & Bobretzky, 1875
- Terebellides Sars, 1835
- Trichobranchus Malmgren, 1866
