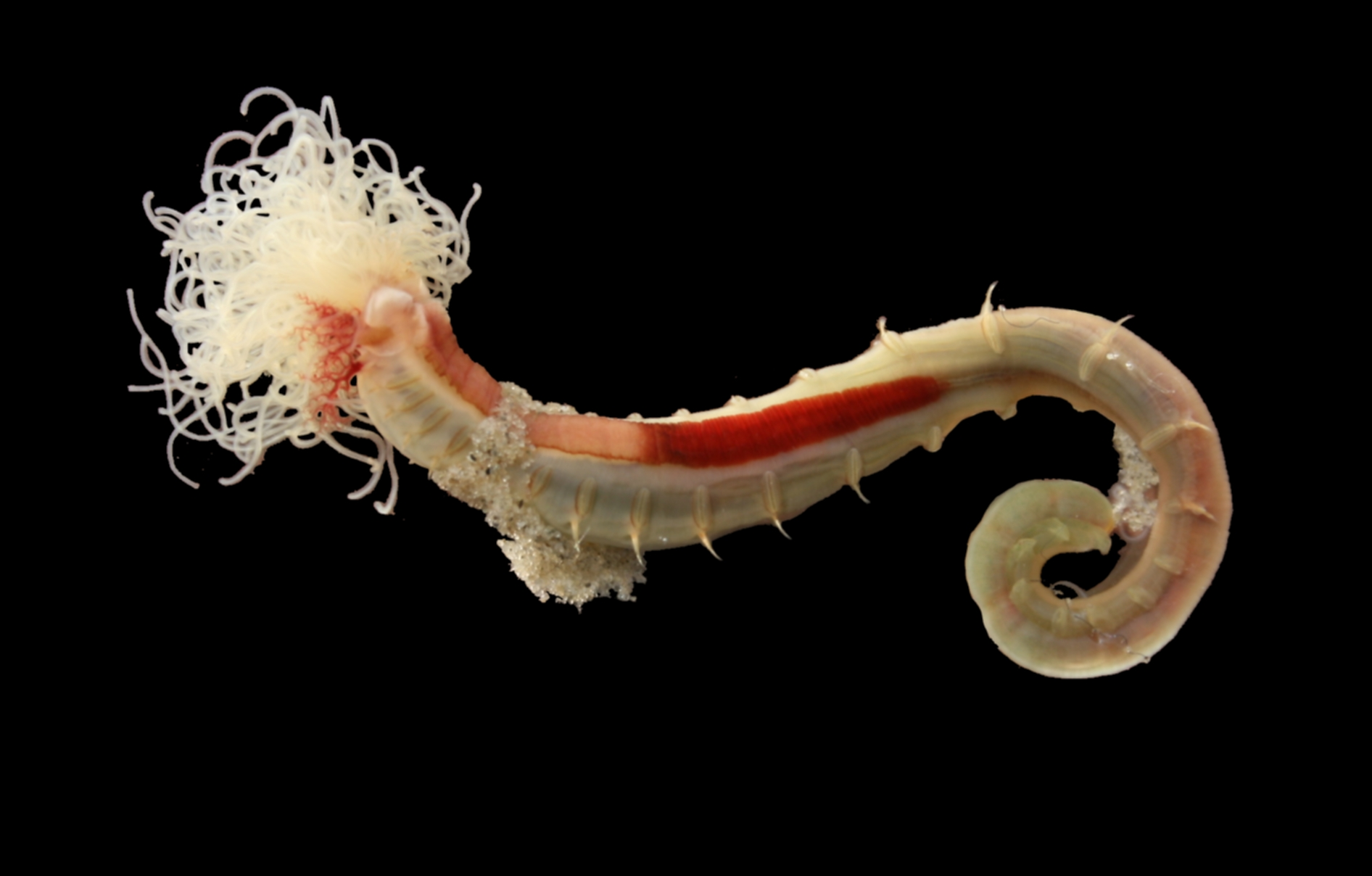
- Lanice conchilega (Amphitritinae), taken out of its burrow.

Scientific classification
- Kingdom: Animalia
- Phylum: Annelida
- Clade: Pleistoannelida
- Clade: Sedentaria
- Suborder: Terebelliformia

Families
- Alvinellidae; Ampharetidae; Pectinariidae; Terebellidae; Trichobranchidae; Melinnidae

= Terebelliformia =

Suborder of annelids

Terebelliformia is a group of polychaete worms in the phylum Annelida.

== Phylogeny ==
The internal relationships within the clade Terebelliformia are the following:

- Terebelliformia
  - Pectinariidae
  - - - Ampharetidae
      - Alvinellidae
    - - - - Samythella neglecta
          - Melinnidae
        - Terebellidae
      - Trichobranchidae
