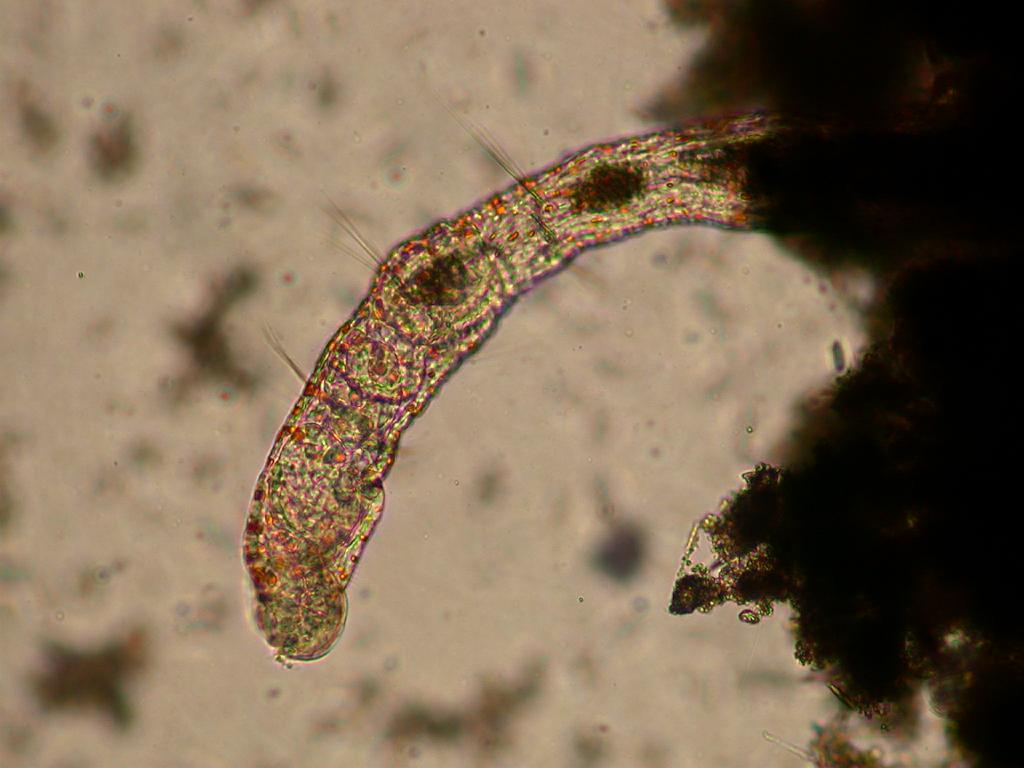
- Aeolosoma

Scientific classification
- Kingdom: Animalia
- Phylum: Annelida
- Clade: Pleistoannelida
- Clade: Sedentaria
- Family: Aeolosomatidae; Beddard, 1895

Genera
- Aeolosoma; Rheomorpha; Hystricosoma

= Aeolosomatidae =

Family of annelid worms

The Aeolosomatidae is a family of very small, aquatic annelid worms, between 0.3 and 10 mm in length and 0.04-0.06 mm in diameter. About 30 species have been described in three genera. These worms are known as suction-feeding worms and occupy freshwater, brackish, and saltwater habitats. They are bottom and sediment dwellers, inhabiting spaces around aquatic plants and the detritus-rich sands and sediments of freshwater habitats (microfauna)

== Ecology ==
Aeolosomatids feed on microalgae, microorganisms, and detritus. They place their prostomia over the substrate and create a vacuum, swallowing small particles and their attached algae. They are able to reproduce sexually, but most reproduction is asexual. This is done by paratomy/fission (fragmentation) as posterior segments break away or detach from the parent worm. This begins when the worm reaches a determined number of millimeters (depending on the species), which gives rise to the clonal production of a chain of filial zooids that detach themselves from the parental zooid in a few days.
