= Hrabeiella =

Scientific classification
- Kingdom: Animalia
- Phylum: Annelida
- Class: incertae sedis
- Family: Hrabeiellidae
- Genus: Hrabeiella; Pizl and Chalupský, 1984
- Species: H. periglandulata

Binomial name
- Hrabeiella periglandulata Pizl and Chalupský, 1984

Species of annelid

Hrabeiella periglandulata is the sole representative belonging to the family Hrabeiellidae, a family of annelids.

Species:

- Hrabeiella periglandulata Pizl and Chalupský, 1984
