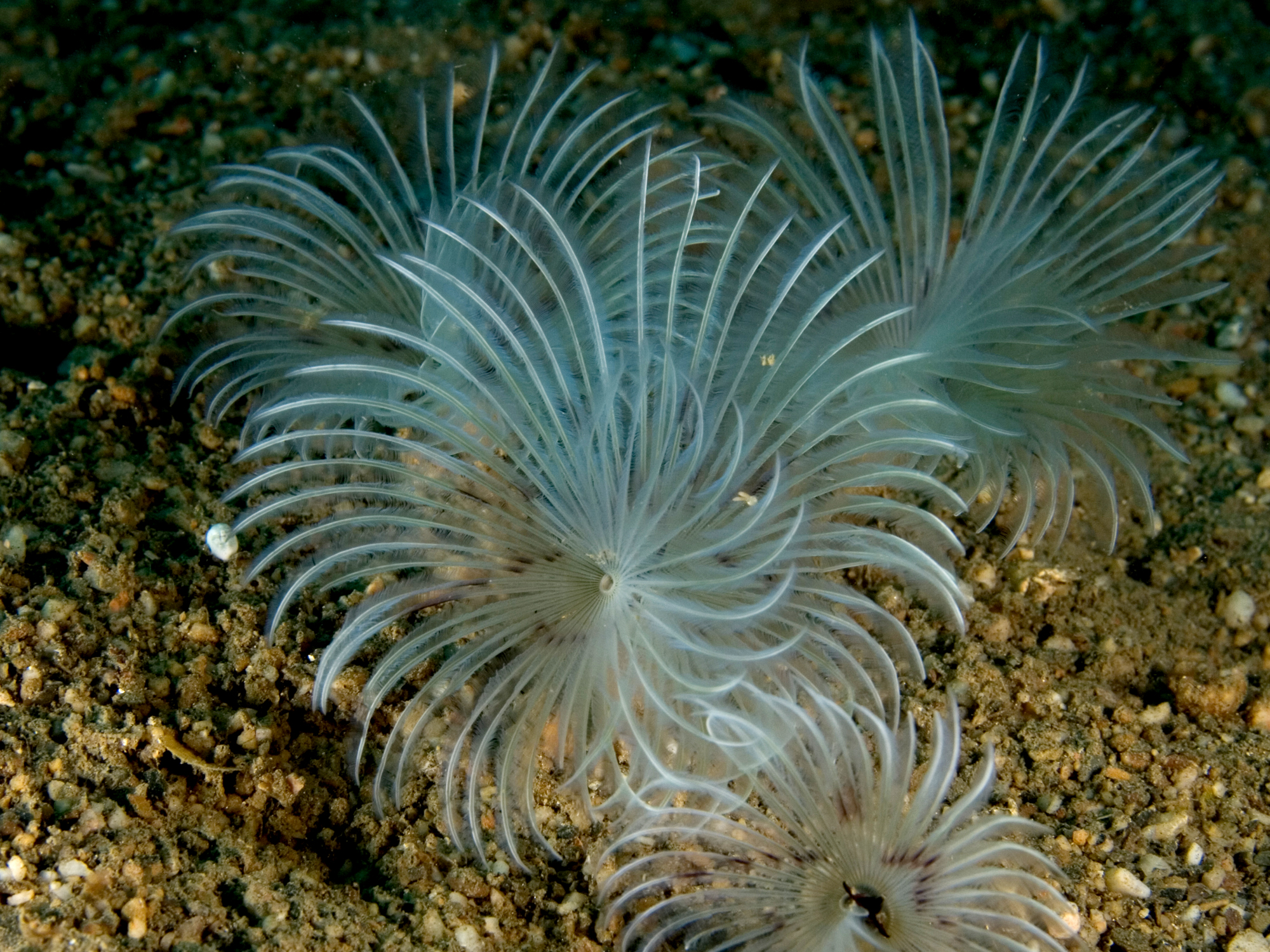
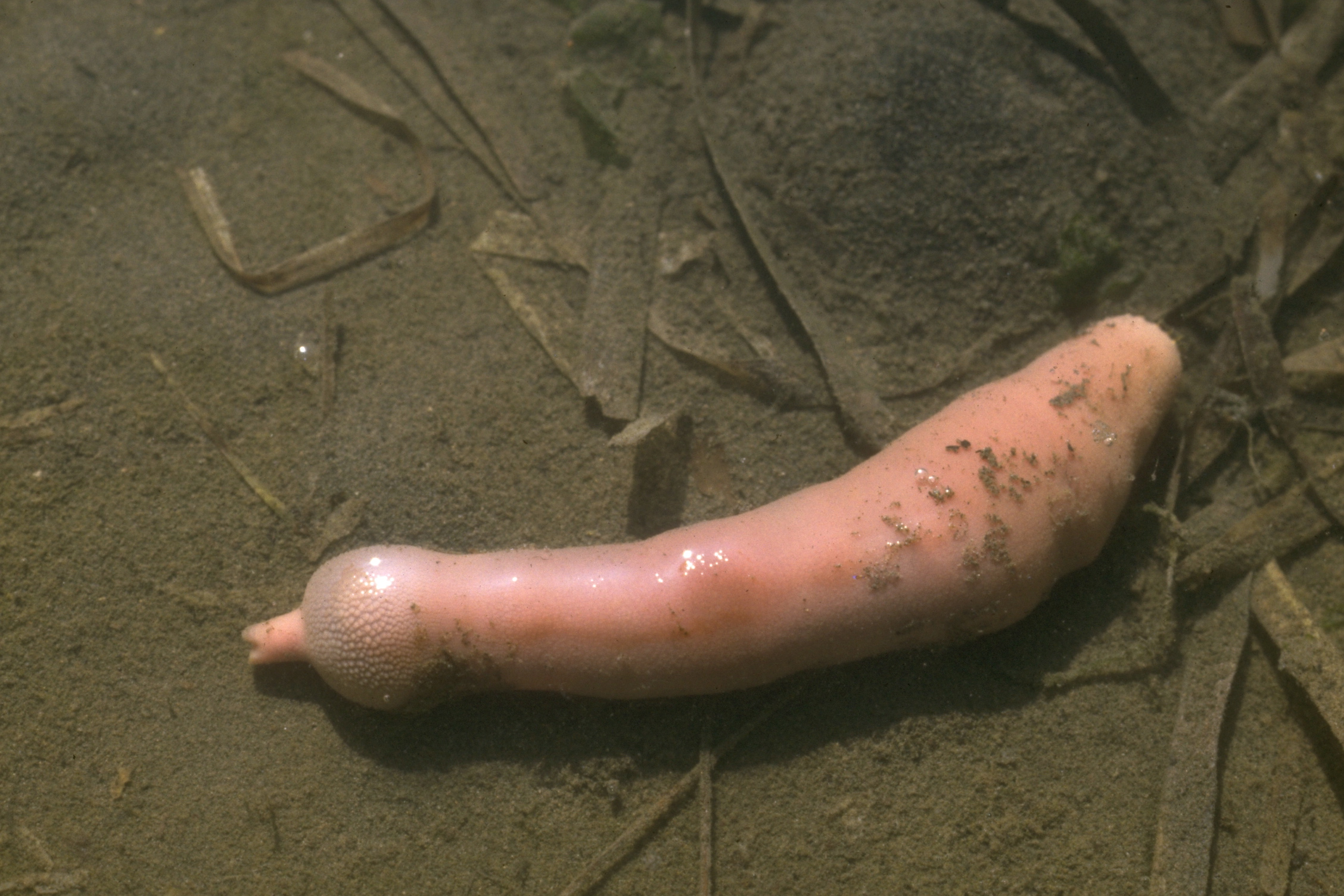
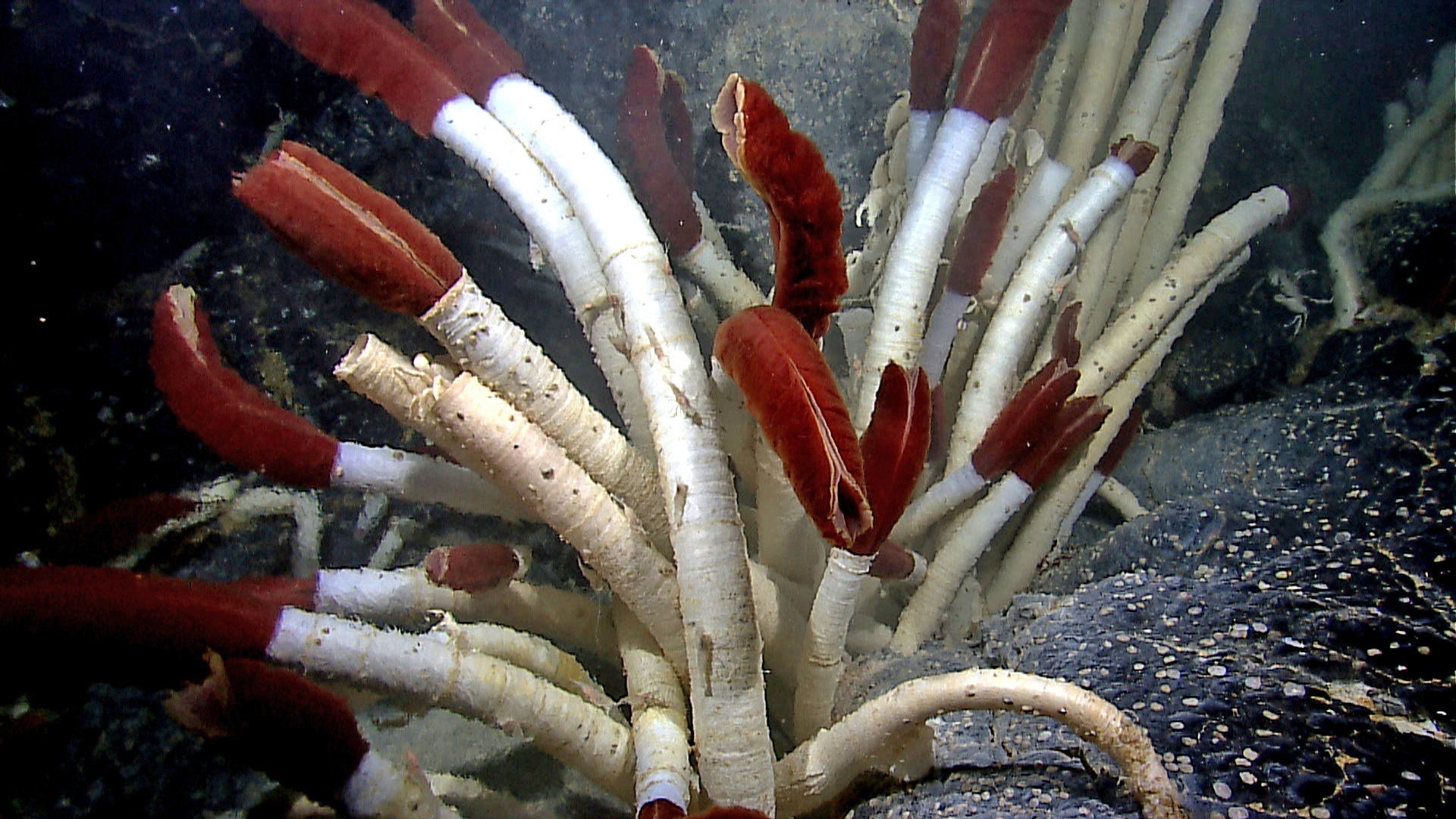
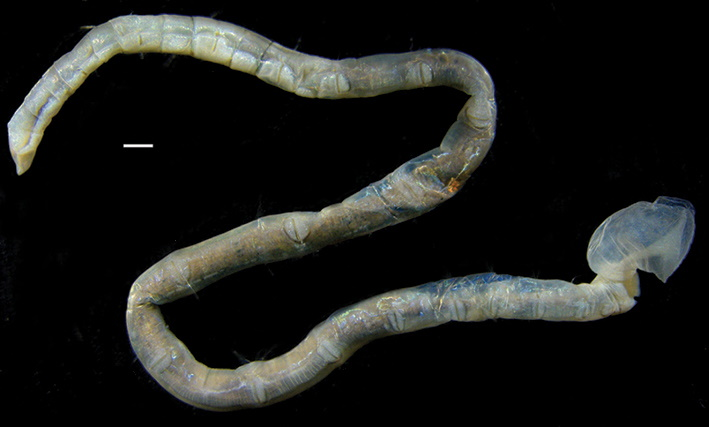
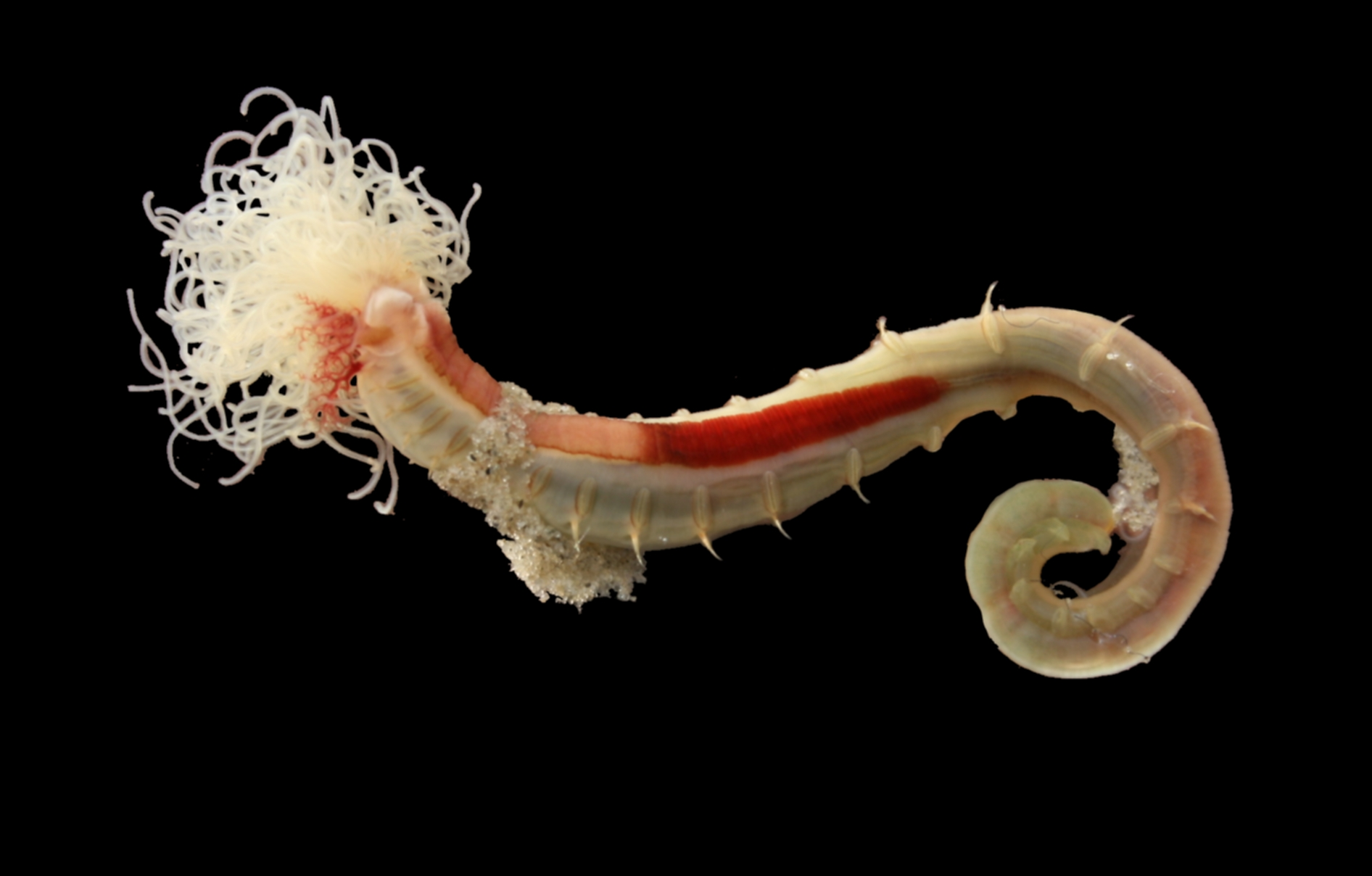
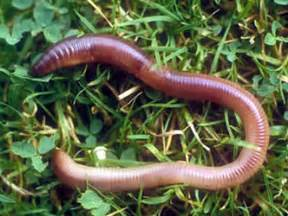
- Examples of Sedentaria (clockwise from upper left corner): Sabellida, Echiura, Maldanomorpha, Clitellata, Terebelliformia, Siboglinidae.

Scientific classification
- Kingdom: Animalia
- Phylum: Annelida
- Clade: Pleistoannelida
- Clade: Sedentaria; Lamarck 1818

Orders and families
- Orbiniida; Cirratuliformia; Siboglinidae (=Pogonophora); Sabellida; Spionida; Opheliida; Capitellida; Echiura; Capitellidae; Terebelliformia; Maldanomorpha; Hrabeiellidae; Aeolosomatidae; Clitellata; "Oligochaetes"; Hirudinea; Incertae sedis: ?Myzostomida; ?Spintheridae

= Sedentaria =

Subclass of annelid worms

Sedentaria is a diverse clade of annelid worms. It is traditionally treated as a subclass of the paraphyletic class Polychaeta, but it is also a monophyletic group uniting several polychaetes and the monophyletic class Clitellata. It is the sister group of Errantia.

Sedentaria are mainly found within marine environments that have low oxygen levels and are specially adapted to these low oxygen environments by increasing gill surface area and having high-affinity respiratory proteins. Furthermore, they go through a process of metabolic depression which lowers their energy use so that they can inhabit these low oxygen zones.

== Etymology ==
The name Sedentaria - to sit or remain in place - describes the habits of this group of worms, contrasted to its sister group, "Errantia" - meaning to wander. Thus, Sedentaria worms are known for staying in a certain vicinity: this includes tube-dwellers (see, Riftia), or burrowers, such as earthworms, who tend to stay localized in their tunnels. By contrast, Errantia roam more freely.

== Phylogeny ==
The phylogeny of polychaetes is slowly being resolved. Sedentaria and Errantia are the two biggest clades of polychaetes, and together they compose clade Pleistoannelida. The Orbiniida are sister to all other Sedentaria lineages. Other groups that are nested within Sedentaria are: Clitellata, the Sabellida/Spionida clade, Opheliida, Echiura, Cirratuliformia, Terebelliformia, Maldanomorpha and the families Siboglinidae and Capitellidae.

- Pleistoannelida
  - Errantia
  - Sedentaria
    - Orbiniida
    - - - - Cirratuliformia
          - Siboglinidae
        - - Sabellida
          - Spionida
      - - - Opheliida
          - Capitellida
            - Echiura
            - Capitellidae
        - - - Terebelliformia
            - Maldanomorpha
              - Maldanidae
              - Arenicolidae
          - Clitellata

Some taxa, such as Spintheridae and Myzostomida, are still difficult to place due to their long branching, but they likely belong to either Errantia or Sedentaria. Hrabeiella and Aeolosomatidae are likely closely related to Clitellata.
