= Ceratocephala =

Ceratocephala may refer to:

- Ceratocephala (plant), a plant genus in the family Ranunculaceae
- Ceratocephala (trilobite), an animal genus in the family Odontopleuridae

== See also ==
- Ceratocephale, a polychaete worm genus in the family Nereididae
