= Nereis onychophora =

Scientific classification
- Kingdom: Animalia
- Phylum: Annelida
- Clade: Pleistoannelida
- Subclass: Errantia
- Order: Phyllodocida
- Family: Nereididae
- Genus: Nereis
- Species: N. onychophora

Binomial name
- Nereis onychophora Horst, 1918

Synonyms
- N. caenocirrus Chamberlin, 1919

Species of ploychaete worm

Nereis onychophora is a polychaete worm of the phylum Annelida. The type locality is in the Seram Sea, Indonesia.

== Etymology ==
The specific epithet, onychophora /ɒnɪˈkɒfərə/, is from Ancient Greek: ονυχής (transliterated onyches; meaning claws) and φέρειν (transliterated pherein; meaning to carry). It shares this name with the phylum Onychophora.

== Description ==
The following is the original description of N. onychophora, from Horst (1918):

Among the plankton-worms, collected at the above-named station, I met with a male Heteronereis, that is characterized by having in the anterior (agamous) body-region, the notopodial fascicle represented by a single, stout, yellow bristle, with a dark brown, hook-shaped apex; the neuropodial fascicle has its usual appearance and contains in its dorsal part some homogomph setigerous bristles and some heterogomph falcigerous ones, whereas ventrally there occur only falcigerous setae, with a terminal piece, that is ciliated along its whole border. The aciculae are blackish. The dorsal ligule is very small, papilliform and bears a cirrus, which is much longer, extending somewhat beyond the extremity of the notopodial lobe, that is large, obtusely conical. The neuropodial lobe has a conical anterior lip and reaches beyond the extremity of the ventral ligule, that is club-shaped. The ventral cirrus is as long as the inferior ligule. In the anterior 5 parapodia the ventral cirrus is gibbous, whereas in the anterior 7 parapodia the dorsal cirrus is swollen in front of the short" filiform tip. The parapodia of the epigamous region show the usual lamellae at the ventral lobe and at the base of the dorsal and ventral cirrus; moreover the ventral ligule has its distal extremity dilated into a lamella. The dorsal cirrus is provided along its ventral border with a dozen of rather large papillae. The terminal pieces of the swimming bristles have their broad distal part terminated by an apex. The epigamous change of the parapodia commences with the 16th segment; in the posterior half of this body-region the segments are provided with a conical papilla in the median, dorsal line. The head is provided with two pairs of large eyes, that are coalesced on each side. The antennae are shorter than the longitudinal diameter of the head and are as long as the palpi. The longest tentacular cirri reach only to the 3rd segment. The armature of the proboscis consists of: I = a single hook-like bent paragnathe. II = a crescent, indistinctly distichous group of about 20 paragnaths. IV = a triangular group of about 25 paragnaths, the anterior ones inconspicuous. III = a transverse, crescent group of 3 rows of paragnaths (9 + 8 + 7), the anterior ones very tiny. V = 0. VI = a small group, consisting of a large paragnath and some smaller ones. VII — VIII = an indistinctly distichous belt of about 18 paragnaths. The specimen has a length of about 15 mm. With regard to the uniformity of structure of the parapodium, presented by nearly all the Nereidae, this species shows a remarquable (sic) exception.
