= Grilled ribs =

Grilled ribs may refer to:

- Galbi, grilled beef or pork ribs in Korean cuisine
- Sườn nướng, grilled pork ribs in Vietnamese cuisine
