= Egg foo young =

Omelette dish

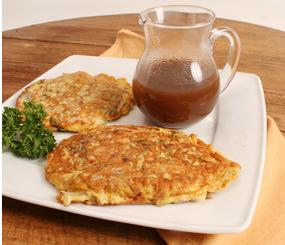
- Pork egg foo young with brown gravy
- Alternative names: Egg fooyung, egg foo yong, egg foo yung, egg fu yung, or fu yung hai
- Type: Meal
- Place of origin: China
- Region or state: Guangdong
- Serving temperature: Hot
- Main ingredients: Eggs, meat, bean sprouts, bamboo shoots, cabbage, spring onions, mushrooms, and water chestnuts
- Variations: roast pork, shrimp, chicken, beef, or lobster

Egg foo young
- Chinese: 芙蓉蛋
Transcriptions
Standard Mandarin
- Hanyu Pinyin: fúróngdàn
- Bopomofo: ㄈㄨˊ ㄖㄨㄥˊ ㄉㄢˋ
- Wade–Giles: fu^{2}-jung^{2}-tan^{4}
- IPA: [fǔ.ɻʊ̌ŋ.tân]
Yue: Cantonese
- Yale Romanization: fùh'yùhngdáan
- Jyutping: fu^{4} jung^{4} daan^{6*2}
- IPA: [fu˩.jʊŋ˩.tan˧˥]

Egg foo young, white rice and an egg roll from a Chinese take-out restaurant in the United States

Egg foo young (Chinese: 芙蓉蛋; pinyin: fúróngdàn; Jyutping: fu^{4} jung^{4} daan^{6*2} (literally meaning "cotton rose egg"), also spelled with fu and yong or yung, is an omelette dish found in Chinese cuisine. The name comes from the Cantonese language pronunciation of its name.

== Preparation ==
The dish originates in the southern Chinese coastal province of Guangdong (previously known as Canton). Most current versions of egg foo young are a Cantonese hybrid both in the United States and Asia.

Literally meaning "Hibiscus egg", this dish is prepared with beaten eggs and most often made with various vegetables such as bean sprouts, bamboo shoots, sliced cabbage, spring onions, mushrooms, and water chestnuts. When meat is used as an ingredient, a choice of roast pork, shrimp, chicken, beef, or lobster may be offered.

In Chinese Indonesian cuisine, it is known as fu yung hai (芙蓉蟹, literally "Hibiscus crab"), sometimes spelled pu yung hai. The omelette is usually made from a mixture of vegetables such as carrots, bean sprouts, and cabbages, mixed with meats such as crab meat, shrimp, or minced chicken. The dish is often served in sweet and sour sauce with peas.

In Western countries, the dish usually appears as a well-folded omelette with the non-egg ingredients embedded in the egg mixture. It may be covered in or served with sauce or gravy. Chinese chefs in the United States, at least as early as the 1930s, created a pancake filled with eggs, vegetables, and meat or seafood. In a U.S. regional variation, many American-Chinese restaurants in St. Louis, Missouri, serve what is called a St. Paul sandwich, which is an egg foo young patty served with mayonnaise, dill pickle, and sometimes lettuce and tomato between two slices of white bread.

In the Netherlands, where Chinese food is influenced by Chinese-Indonesian cuisine, it is known as Foeyonghai, and is usually served with a sweet tomato sauce. Strictly, according to hai in the name, it should contain crab, but it is often served without this ingredient.

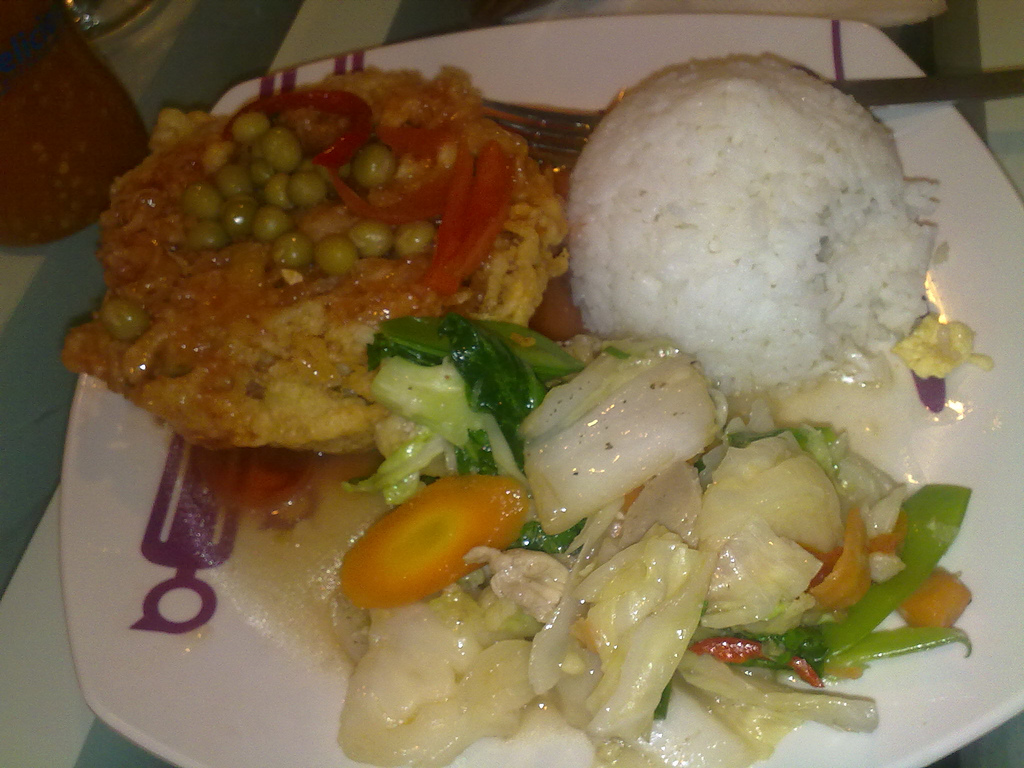
Chinese Indonesian fu yung hai, cap cai and rice

== Comparison ==
The Vietnamese dish chả trứng hấp is similar to egg foo young.

In Japanese Chinese cuisine, the dish kani-tama (かに玉 or 蟹玉) is similar, using crab meat instead of ham or other meats. Egg foo yung or kani-tama on plain rice draped with thick savory sauce is called Tenshin-han (天津飯, Tianjin rice), even though no such dish is known in the actual Chinese city of Tianjin.

In Malay cuisine, it is similar to telur bungkus, which literally means "wrapped egg" (the wrap usually contains chicken or beef, onions, mushrooms, vegetables, and gravy, wrapped inside the egg).

In Chinese Thai cuisine, this dish is called Khai Chiao Yat Sai (ไข่เจียวยัดไส้), which literally means "stuffed fried egg". The common recipe uses minced pork and shredded spring onion.

== See also ==
- Chinese steamed eggs
- Okonomiyaki
- List of egg dishes
- List of onion dishes
- List of vegetable dishes
