= Nicon =

Nicon may refer to:

- Aeulius Nicon, Roman architect
- Tom Nicon (1988–2010), French fashion model
- Nicon (annelid), genus of polychaete worms
- Nicon, an ancient port in Southern Somalia, alternatively spelled as Nikon

== See also ==
- Nikon (disambiguation)
