= Nereis sandersi =

Scientific classification
- Kingdom: Animalia
- Phylum: Annelida
- Clade: Pleistoannelida
- Subclass: Errantia
- Order: Phyllodocida
- Family: Nereididae
- Genus: Nereis
- Species: N. sandersi

Binomial name
- Nereis sandersi Blake, 1985

Species of annelid worm

Nereis sandersi is a species of sandworm in the family Nereididae.
