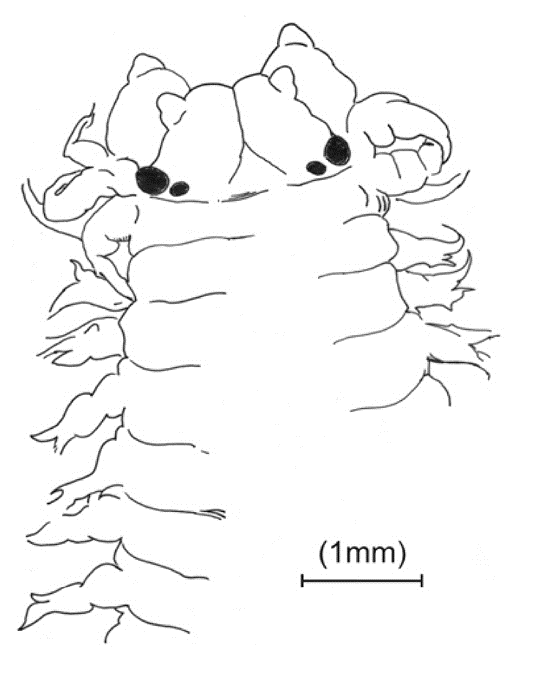
- Anterior end of N. jaya

Scientific classification
- Domain: Eukaryota
- Kingdom: Animalia
- Phylum: Annelida
- Clade: Pleistoannelida
- Subclass: Errantia
- Order: Phyllodocida
- Family: Nereididae
- Genus: Namalycastis
- Species: N. jaya

Binomial name
- Namalycastis jaya Magesh, Kvist & Glasby, 2012
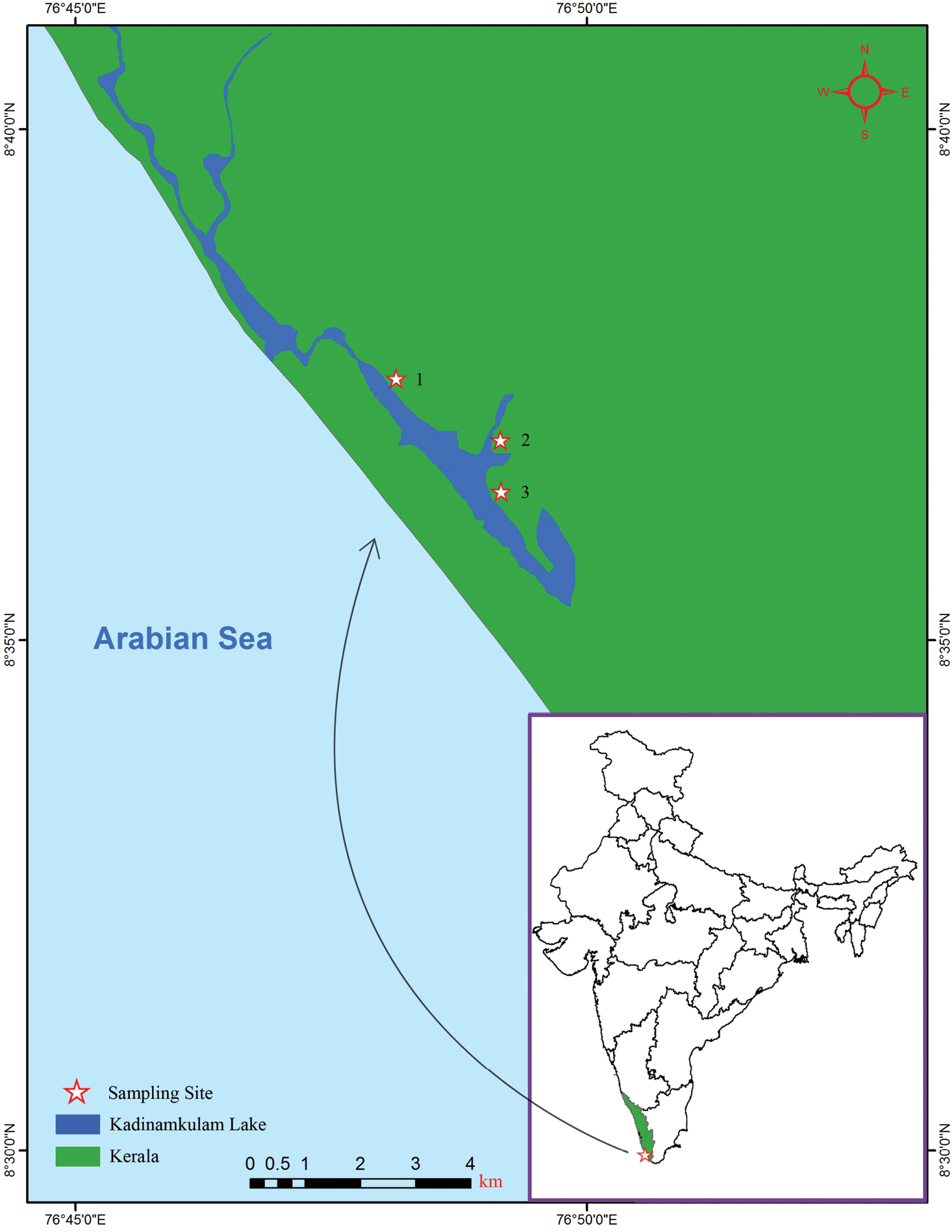
- Collection localities of N. jaya

= Namalycastis jaya =

Species of annelid

Namalycastis jaya is a species of brackish-water polychaete worm in the family Nereididae known from the southern coast of Kerala in southwest India.

Type locality: Thiruvananthapuram coast, Kerala, India, 8°36'57.47"N, 76°49'8.914"E

Etymology: The worm is named for Tamil Nadu Chief minister J. Jayalalithaa who developed education in Tamil Nadu.
