= Nikon (disambiguation) =

Nikon may refer to:

- Nikon, a Japanese camera and optics manufacturer (1917–present)
- Nikon (given name)
- Nikon, a second-century trading port in southern Somalia

== See also ==
- Nicon (disambiguation)
