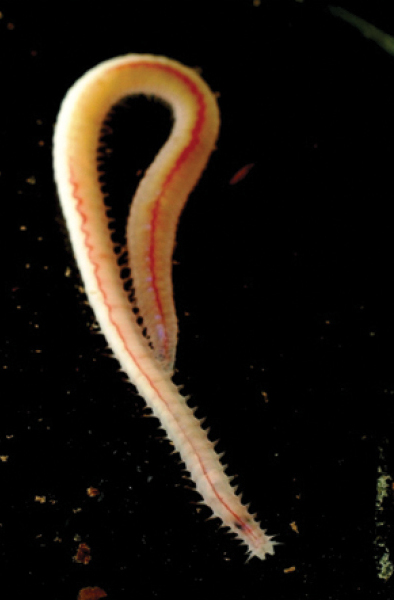
- Namanereis llanetensis

Scientific classification
- Kingdom: Animalia
- Phylum: Annelida
- Clade: Pleistoannelida
- Subclass: Errantia
- Order: Phyllodocida
- Family: Nereididae
- Subfamily: Namanereidinae; Hartman, 1959

Type genus
- Namanereis Chamberlin, 1919

Species
- Namalycastis; Namanereis

Synonyms
- Lycastinae Corrêa, 1948; Namanereinae Hartman, 1959

= Namanereidinae =

Subfamily of bristleworms

Namanereidinae is a subfamily of nereidid polychaete worms which are adapted to live in habitats of low salinity, unlike most other polychaetes which inhabit marine environments. According to the World Register of Marine Species, there are 50 valid species in two genera; a third genus, Lycastoides is a taxon inquirendum due to the loss of its type specimen. They are found from the tropics to high latitudes, and inhabit intertidal areas (such as mangroves and saltmarshes) to "uplifted coastal areas"; a number of species are hypogean stygobionts, inhabiting groundwater and exhibiting the typical features of cave animals, such as skin depigmentation and eyelessness. Various species are known to associate with plants (especially the damp areas such as phytotelmata) and plant debris, and they seem to prefer these habitats.

== Taxonomy ==
The scientific names of both genera combine the Ancient Greek word nama-, meaning spring or stream, with Lycastis and Nereis, being two scientific names used for nereidid worms. Both generic names thus allude to the freshwater habitats that are inhabited by some species in the subfamily.

Prior to modern phylogenetic analyses, namanereidines were considered to be the sister group to all other Nereididae; a 2020 analysis of nereidid mitogenomes did recover Namalycastis abiuma in a basal position, but it was not the most "primitive" nereidid in the analysis.

Namalycastis species tend to be larger-bodied than those of Namanereis, possesses four pairs of tentacular cirri, short and subconical antennae, along with "flattened and leaf-like posterior cirrophores". In contrast, Namanereis is smaller, has three pairs of tentacular cirri, no dorsal cirrophores nor notosetae, and a "tripartite pygidium. Features of the setae and their rows/bundles (fascicles) are essential in identifying both genus and species

== Description ==
Members of Namanereidinae are diagnosed through the presence of paired lateral antennae (though some species lack these), the larynx being divided into oral and maxillary rings though lacking paragnaths or papillae, biarticulated palps with compact palpophores, 3-4 pairs of cirri on the tentacles, along with the "parapodia reduced to sesquiramous with notopodia reduced, lacking notopodial lobe or ligules and showing only dorsal cirri and notoaciculae; notochaetae as sesquigomph spinigers; neurochaetae including sesquigomph spinigers, heterogomph falcigers and heterogomph spinigers in supra-acicular fascicles; heterogomph spinigers, heterogomph pseudospinigers and heterogomph falcigers in sub-acicular fascicles". In all members of the subfamily, the distal region of the palp, the palpostyle, is spherical in shape, and the notoacicula are placed ventrally.

A number of adaptations to prevent desiccation is seen in various namanereidines, especially those inhabiting low-salinity and semi-terrestrial environments; these are evident in the eyes along with the integument and epidermis. Adaptations to low-oxygen may also be present, such as segmental gill hearts, leaf-like dorsal cirri rich in capillaries, and a behavior of waving the posterior segments in water. Their nephridia appears to be an important part of their osmoregulatory process through the expulsion of excess water from their bodies.

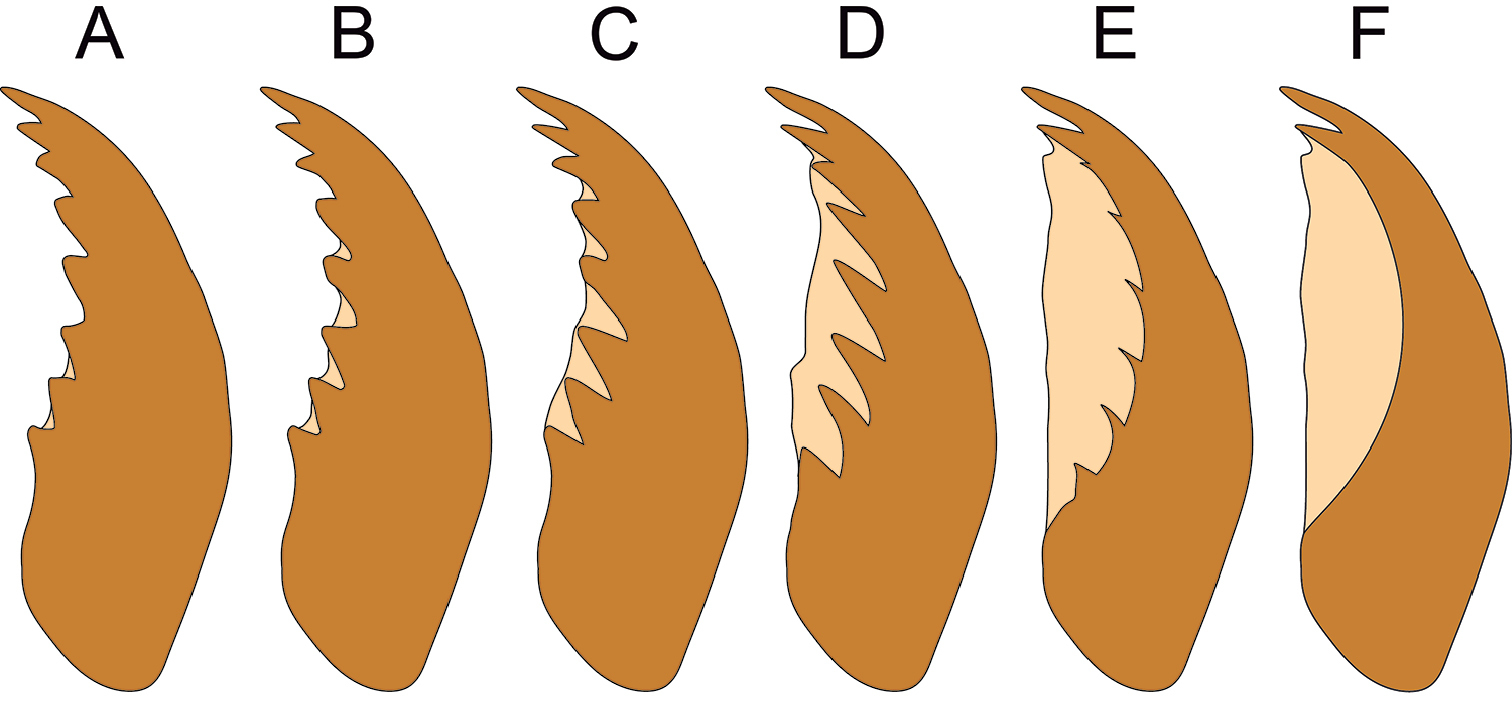
Proposed evolutionary sequence of jaws in Namanereidinae, with (A) being an ancestral nereidid and (F) being derived namanereidines with bifid jaws.

The only known description of a larva is of a 3-setiger stage of N. ranauensis, which closely resembled other larval nereidids, such as in the possession of biramous parapodia.

Some species evolved bifid jaws, developed from the ancestral nereidid serrated jaw, which may be an adaptation for deposit-feeding ("shoveling"), due to energetic costs or lack of certain trace elements needed to harden the jaw elements, and/or other adaptations necessary when colonizing semi-terrestrial and groundwater habitats.

== Distribution ==
The modern, widespread distribution of Namanereis may suggest vicariance from the breakup of Gondwana in the Late Jurassic. Alternatively, it may indicate speciation from marine Namanereis ancestors which independently colonized inland environments. Plesiomorphic features in the marine species seems to support the latter theory; that being the ancestral namanereidine inhabited coastal, euryhaline habitats.

In any case, endemic namanereidines are found in the Caribbean, the Canary Islands, India, Socotra, and Australia.

Namalycastis hawaiiensis is known to be introduced to countries outside its native habitat; with a broad natural distribution in the Indo-Pacific from Sumatra to Hawaii, and from the Ryukyus to Papua New Guinea, it has been identified in the aquarium trade in mainland Japan and Australia, and is thought to have established a population in the Sa'adya stream, which feeds into the Kishon River. Conversely, the temperate species inhabit the North Island, along with subantarctic locales such as the Strait of Magellan, Auckland Island, Adams Island, and Campbell Island.

== Habitat ==
Across the species, namanereidines can tolerate salinities from fresh/potable water to hypersaline conditions of 13% salinity.

Namanereidines are deposit feeders, though they also consume small invertebrates. Most species are found in association with plant detritus, such as dead wood and leaves, which may provide food and protect the worms from desiccation. One species is capable of inhabiting the axils of Pandanus trees, and several species associate with the Nypa palm. Still some other species inhabit the leaf litter of mangrove forests, a "semiterrestrial" environment. Namalycastis borealis eats wood, being a xylophage.

Their detritivorous habit may lead to the ingestion of microplastics. A number of species are seemingly highly resistant to the effects of pollutants, such as industrial waste, organics, hydrocarbons, and heavy metals.
