= Broken rice =

Fragments of rice grains

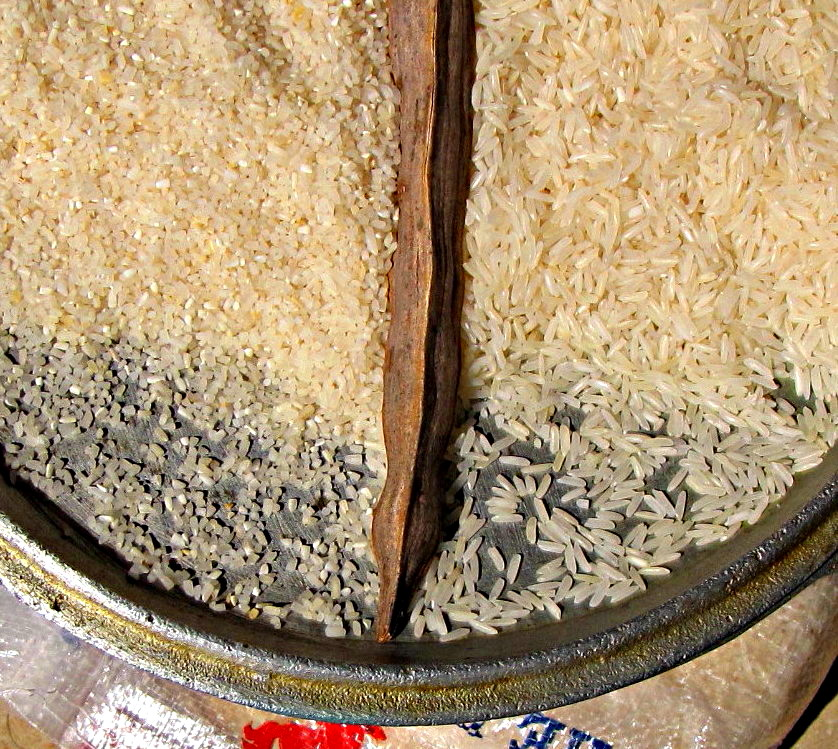
Left, broken or Mali rice; right, long-grain rice. The former is popular in Senegal, where it is used interchangeably with couscous.

Broken rice is fragments of rice grains, broken in the field, during drying, during transport, or during milling. Mechanical separators are used to separate the broken grains from the whole grains and sort them by size.

Broken rice is fragmented, not considered to be defective, and besides aesthetics, it is equivalent to non-broken rice. It is as nutritious as the equivalent quantity of unbroken rice (i.e. if all the germ and bran remains, it is as nutritious as brown rice; if none remains, it is as nutritious as white rice).

Broken rice has a long history; Ibn Baṭṭūṭa mentions rice couscous in the area of Mali in 1350, presumably made of African rice.

== Milling ==
Broken rice from a rice huller will be brown whole grain; broken rice from a gristmill may be white.

On milling, Oryza sativa, commonly known as Asian rice or paddy rice, produces around 50% whole rice then approximately 16% broken rice, 20% husk, 14% bran and meal. African rice, Oryza glaberrima, has more brittle grains, so breakage is higher.

== Human consumption ==
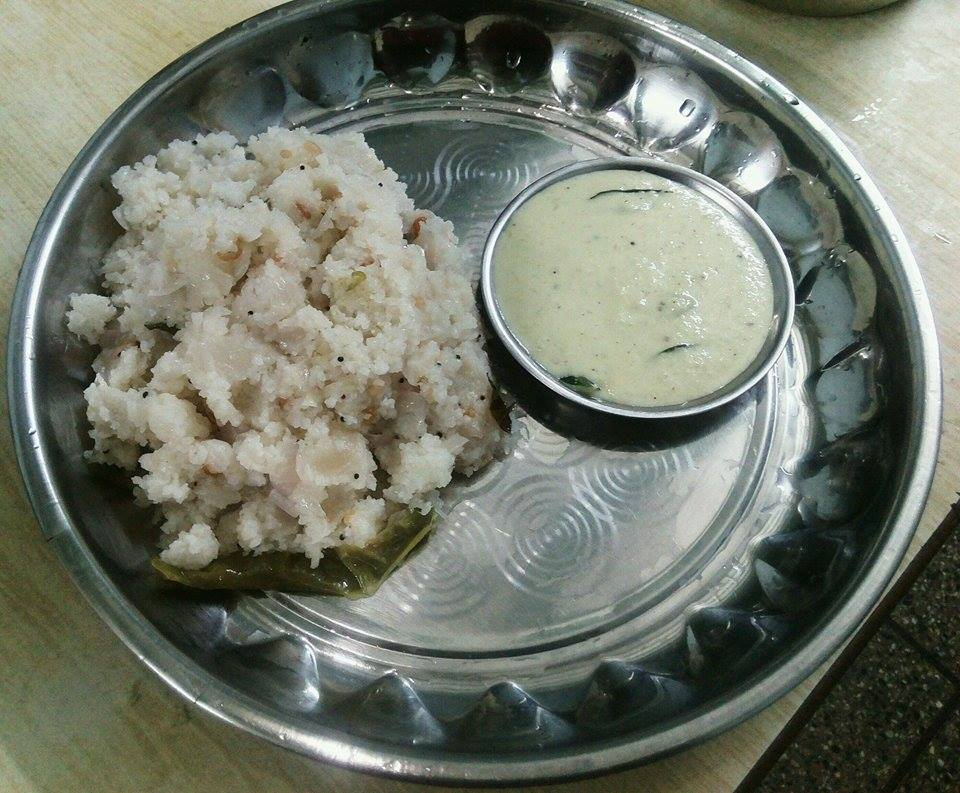
An upma dish of broken rice cooked with onions, chilli and ginger, and served with coconut chutney, from India

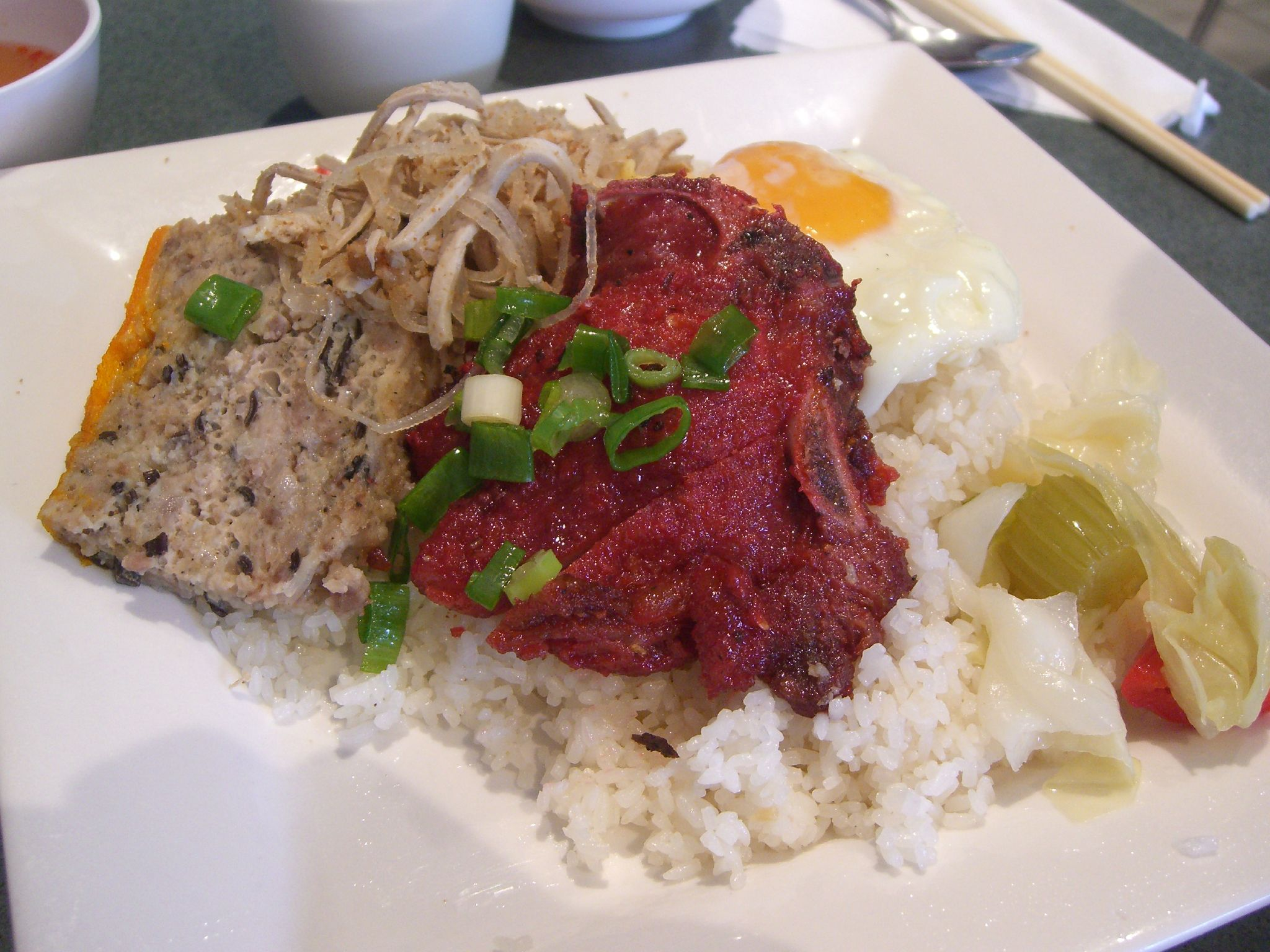
Cơm tấm (literally "broken rice") with a lemongrass pork chop, from Vietnam.

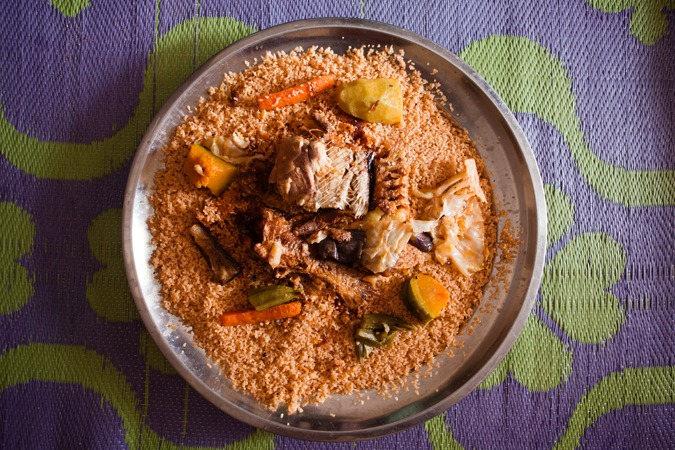
A thieboudienne from Mauritania, with tomato broken rice, fish, and vegetables.

Due to the different size and shape of the grains, broken rice has a different, softer texture from "unbroken" rice, and absorbs flavours more easily. It cooks faster, using less fuel, and can be used to make rice porridges and congees, which need long cooking times.

The broken varieties are often less expensive, and so are preferred by poorer consumers, but they are also eaten by choice, with some cookbooks describing how to break unbroken rice to produce the desired texture or speed cooking.

Broken rice is consumed as part of local cuisine in West Africa (where the traditional African rice is easier to break), Thailand, Bangladesh and elsewhere in South East Asia. In Vietnam, cơm tấm (literally "broken rice") is a popular rice dish with pork. Thieboudienne is a popular dish in west Africa often made with broken rice. Broken rice is called rice grist or middlins in South Carolina. In Bangladesh it is called khood. It is typically dressed with roasted peppers, garlic and mustard oil.

== Industrial uses ==
Very small broken rice is called brewers' rice, as brewers have traditionally used it, although it is also sold to other users. For example, broken rice can be used by the pet food industry, and for livestock feeding and aquaculture. Broken rice is also used to make starch which is used as laundry starch and in foods, cosmetics and textile manufacture.
