= Chả trứng =

Vietnamese steamed egg with pork

- Alternative names: Chả trứng hấp, chả trứng thịt
- Course: Entree
- Place of origin: Vietnam
- Associated cuisine: Vietnamese
- Similar dishes: Chả rươi

Chả trứng, also chả trứng hấp (steamed) and chả trứng thịt (pork), is a Vietnamese steamed omelette, or egg meat loaf with pork. Trứng translates to egg, thịt translates to meat but is usually pork. It is usually served with hot rice, cucumber and chili sauce.

The broken rice dish cơm tấm bì (skin) comes with a chả trứng egg meatloaf.

Chả rươi is a special seasonal (autumn) omelette using nereididae sandworms (rươi) instead of pork.
