= Bay sach chruk =

Cambodian pork and rice dish

- Type: Breakfast
- Place of origin: Cambodia
- Region or state: Southeast Asia
- Associated cuisine: Cambodia
- Serving temperature: Hot
- Main ingredients: Pork, rice

Bay sach chruk (Khmer: បាយសាច់ជ្រូក [baːj sac cruːk]; lit. 'rice and pork') is a Cambodian pork and rice dish. It is commonly served as a breakfast dish.

== Description ==
Bay sach chruk is made from thin cuts of pork marinated in palm sugar, garlic, coconut milk, and fish sauce with variations of the marinade in different parts of Cambodia. This pork is served with steamed rice paired with a bowl of chicken broth garnished with radishes and fried onions. The dish is normally prepared and kept warm over a grill or a bed of coals. It is a common breakfast food in Cambodia.

== See also ==
- Galbi
- Sườn nướng
