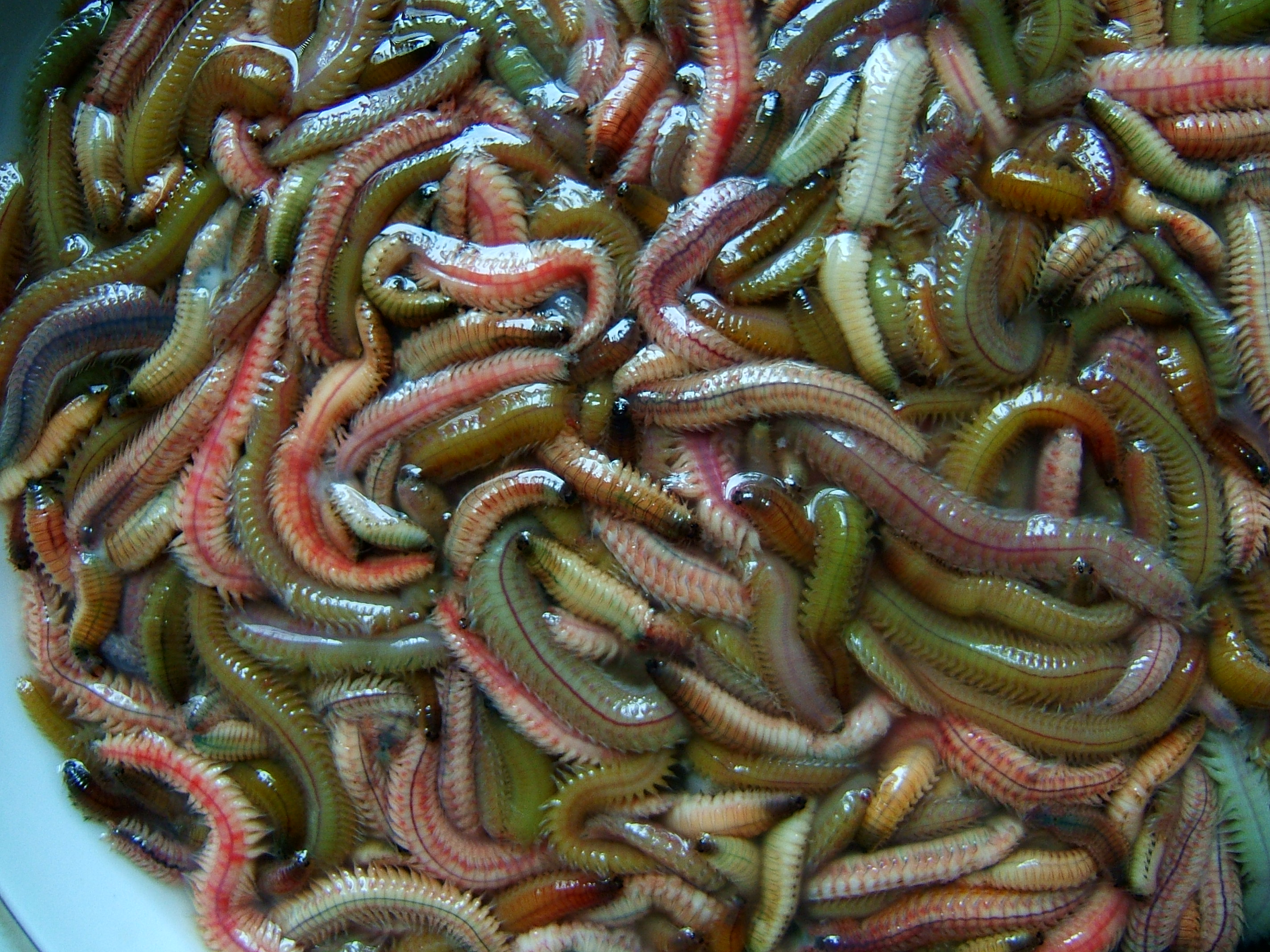

Scientific classification
- Kingdom: Animalia
- Phylum: Annelida
- Clade: Pleistoannelida
- Subclass: Errantia
- Order: Phyllodocida
- Family: Nereididae
- Genus: Tylorrhynchus
- Species: T. heterochetus

Binomial name
- Tylorrhynchus heterochetus (Quatrefages, 1866)

= Tylorrhynchus heterochetus =

Edible species of annelid worm

Tylorrhynchus heterochetus, also known as the Japanese palolo is a species of edible ragworm.

The species can be commonly found in estuaries of the Yellow Sea, East China Sea and South China Sea. Its mature size is circa 5.65 cm.

The worm inhabits the muddy soil of estuaries and rice paddies. During the reproductive season in November and December, the worms swim up to the surface and migrate to sea at high tide. The males will turn to a white milky colour, whereas females will attain a white-green colour. As the worms reach the higher salinity seawater, they will release their gametes and die.

Due to pollution and changes to their natural environments, they are nowadays less numerous, and entirely extinct in some habitats.

The up to 35 cm deep burrows made by the worm in muddy sea beds help to bring oxygen to nitrifying bacteria.

== Relationship with humans ==
=== As food ===
It is eaten as a local delicacy in the Chinese coastal provinces of Guangdong, Fujian and Zhejiang and in Northeast Vietnam. The worm has high nutritional value in protein and fats. A 2022 study reported that T. heterochaetus possesses significant antioxidant activities and is rich in proteins, essential amino acids, and unsaturated fatty acids.

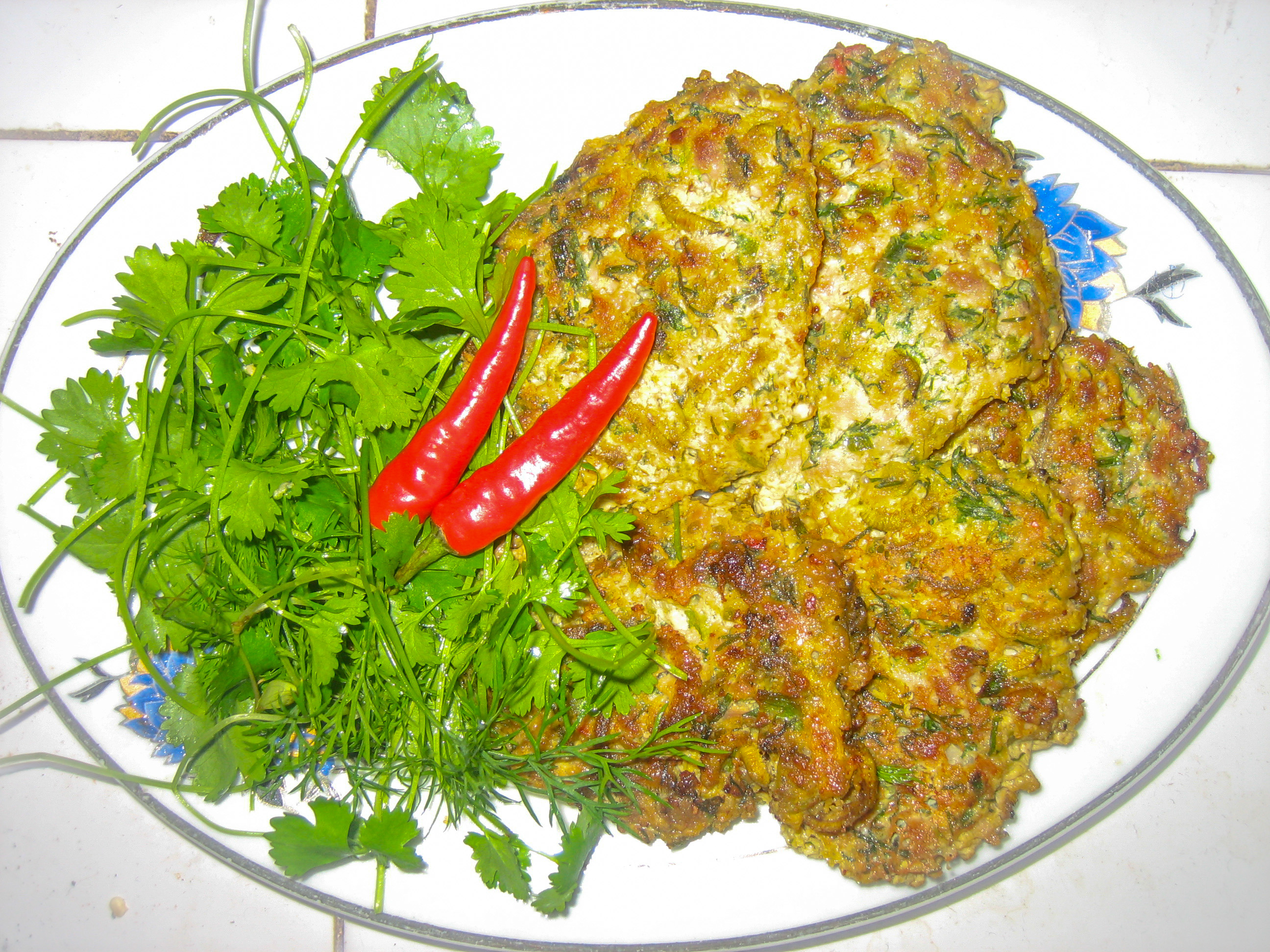
Chả rươi

In Vietnam, it is mainly used in a dish called chả rươi, which has been known as a delicacy for centuries, especially in the area of Tứ Kỳ district, Hải Dương province.

As it occurs only during its breeding season, farmers can earn relatively high incomes from harvesting the worms. In some areas, this has resulted in overfishing.

=== As medicine ===
It is also used in traditional Chinese medicine. A study has shown that consumption of the worm has an anti-fatigue effect on mice.

=== Other uses ===
Since the worms are sensitive to changes in their environmental conditions, they are sometimes used by researchers to monitor the quality of marine habitats.
