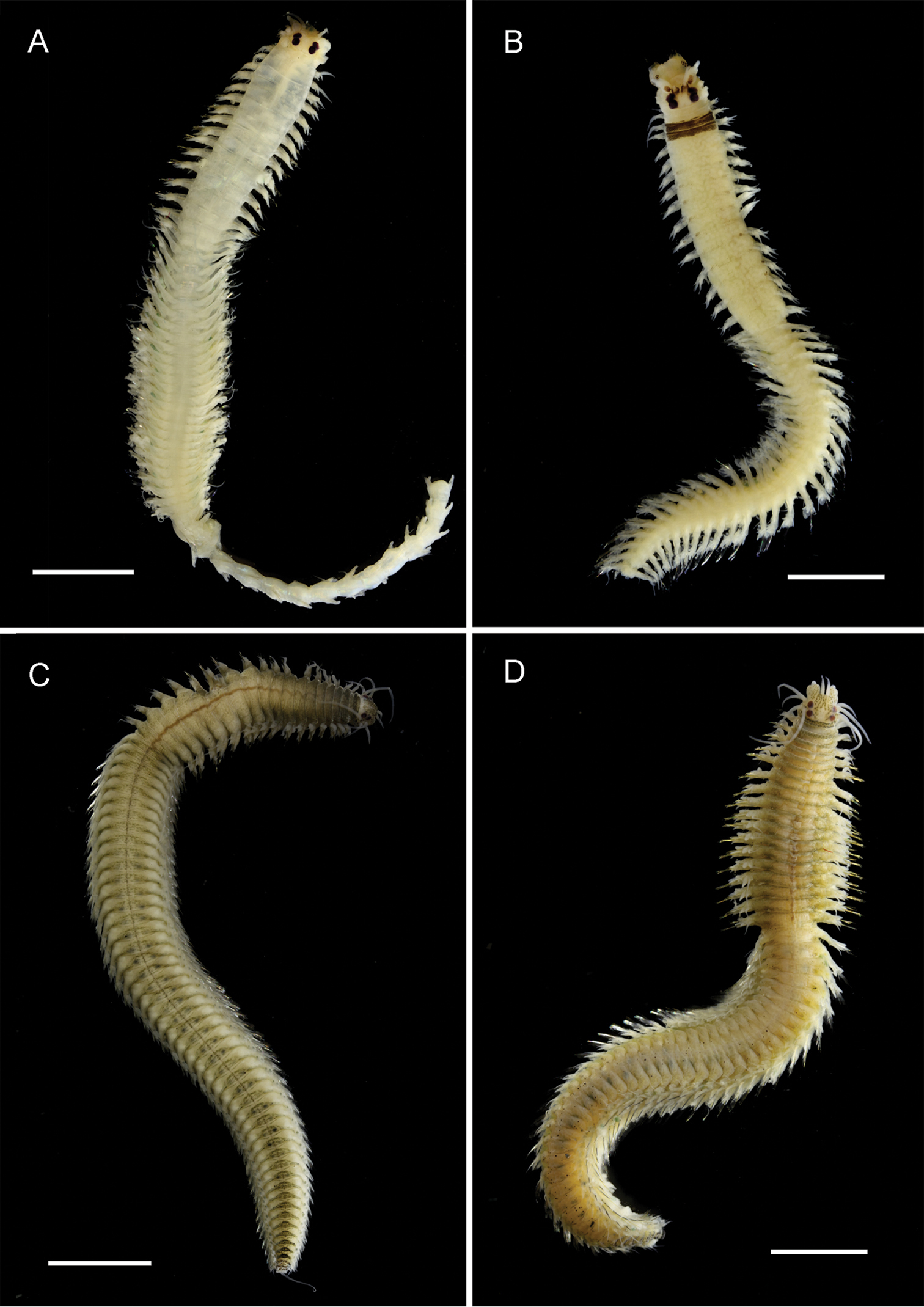
- Nereidid epitokes, preserved specimens, dorsal view. A Ceratonereis singularis australis, male B Ceratonereis singularis australis, female (unmodified tail section missing) C Composetia marmorata, male D Composetia marmorata, female. Scales bars: 1 mm.

Scientific classification
- Kingdom: Animalia
- Phylum: Annelida
- Clade: Pleistoannelida
- Subclass: Errantia
- Order: Phyllodocida
- Family: Nereididae
- Subfamily: Nereidinae
- Genus: Ceratonereis; Kinberg, 1865

Type species
- Ceratonereis mirabilis Kinberg, 1865

Species
- See text

= Ceratonereis =

Genus of annelid worms

Ceratonereis is a genus of polychaete worms from the family Nereididae.

== Species ==
The following species are assigned to Ceratonereis:

- Ceratonereis brunnea Langerhans, 1884
- Ceratonereis dawydovi (Fauvel, 1937)
- Ceratonereis debilis (Grube, 1857)
- Ceratonereis divaricata (Grube, 1878)
- Ceratonereis dorsolineata (Horst, 1924)
- Ceratonereis fallax (Quatrefages, 1866)
- Ceratonereis gracilis (Webster, 1884)
- Ceratonereis hastifera (Fauvel, 1937)
- Ceratonereis hemphrichii (Grube, 1873)
- Ceratonereis imperfecta (Gravier & Dantan, 1934)
- Ceratonereis incisa (Gravier & Dantan, 1934)
- Ceratonereis japonica Imajima, 1972
- Ceratonereis kardagica (Vinogradov, 1933)
- Ceratonereis longicirrata Perkins, 1980
- Ceratonereis marmorata (Horst, 1924)
- Ceratonereis mirabilis Kinberg, 1865
- Ceratonereis obockensis Gravier, 1901
- Ceratonereis obockensis Gravier, 1902
- Ceratonereis obocki Gravier, 1899
- Ceratonereis pectinifera (Grube, 1878)
- Ceratonereis tentaculata Kinberg, 1866
- Ceratonereis ternatensis (Fischli, 1900)
- Ceratonereis tripartita Horst, 1918
