= Tenshindon =

Crab meat omelette on rice

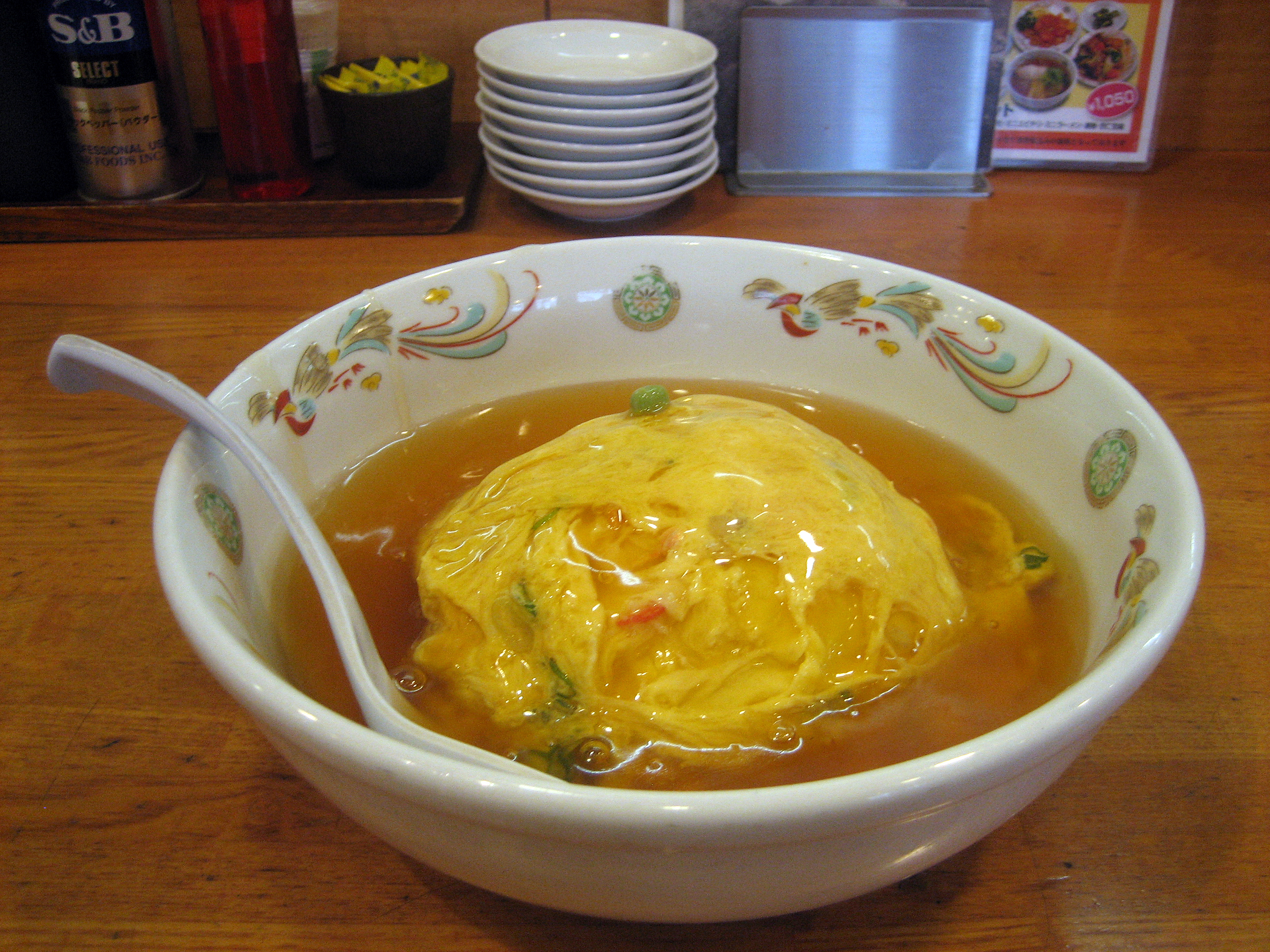
- Tenshindon
- Alternative names: 天津丼 天津飯 (tenshinhan)
- Type: Omelette
- Place of origin: Japan
- Region or state: East Asia
- Main ingredients: Eggs, crab meat, rice

Tenshindon (Japanese: 天津丼, lit. 'Tianjin bowl'), also known as tenshinhan (Japanese: 天津飯, lit. 'Tianjin rice'), is a Japanese Chinese donburi (rice bowl) dish, consisting of a crab meat omelette on rice topped with a soy and vinegar sauce. The dish is named after Tianjin in northern China.

Tenshindon is not known to be related to any dish in Tianjin cuisine, and both the origin of the dish and the reason it is named after Tianjin are contested. Records from the Taisho era (1912–1926) mention a crab omelette dish called fuyō kani (芙蓉蟹), where fuyō is the Japanese reading of foo young, but not the name tenshindon. The earliest attested uses of the name date to after World War 2, when the dish is said to have been invented by restaurateurs in either Tokyo or Osaka, possibly in reference to or inspired by soldiers returning from China.

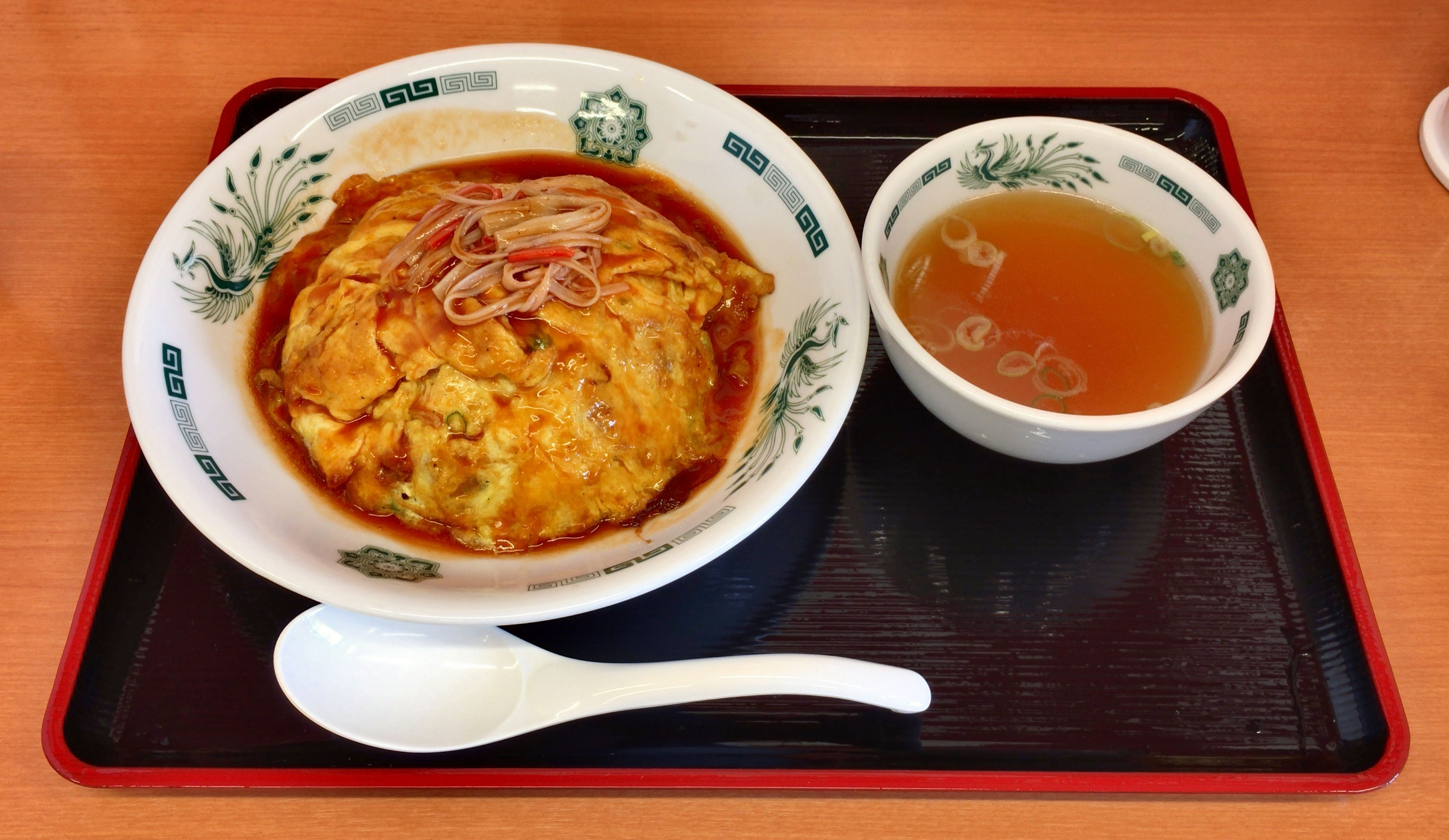

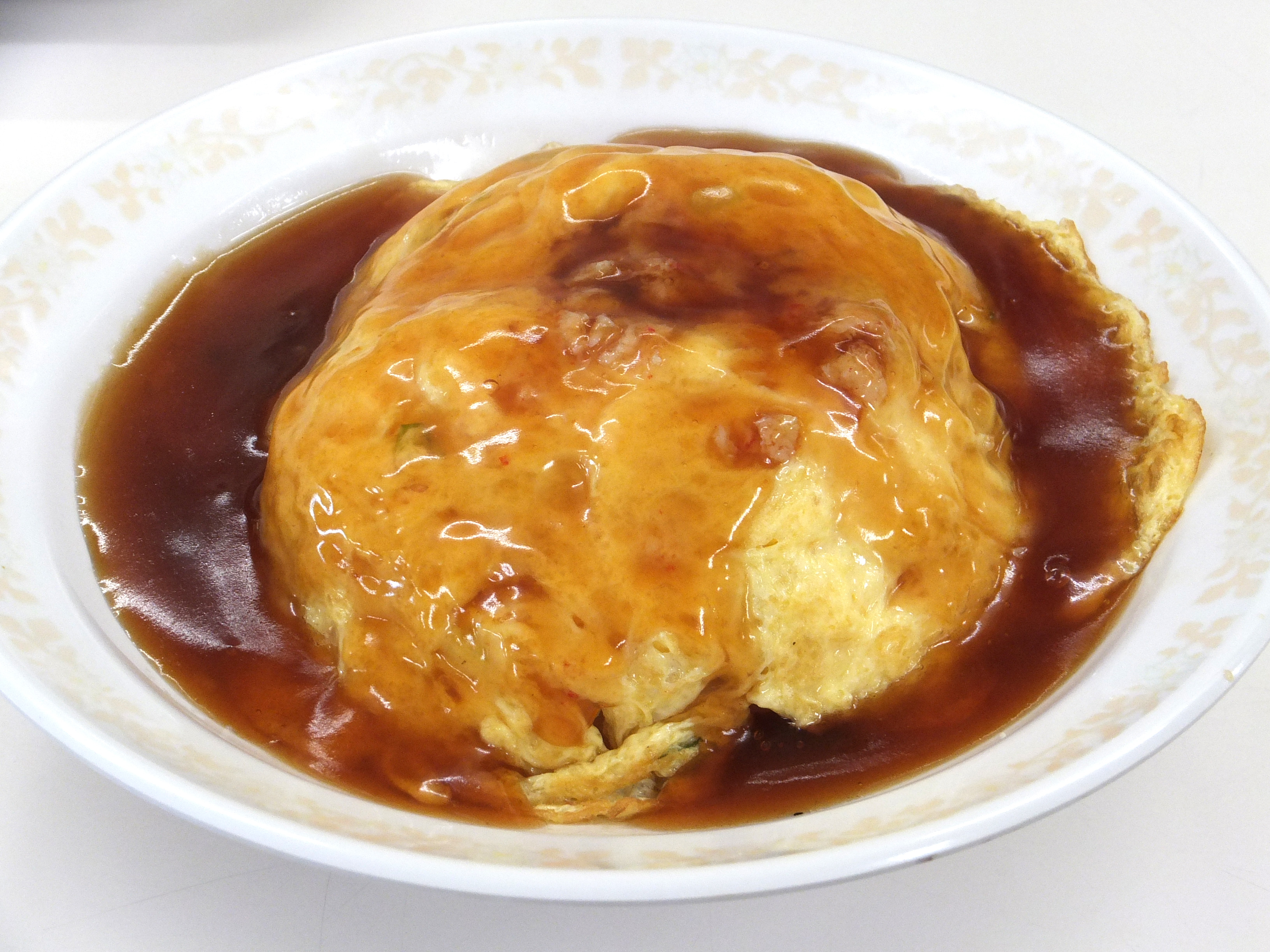

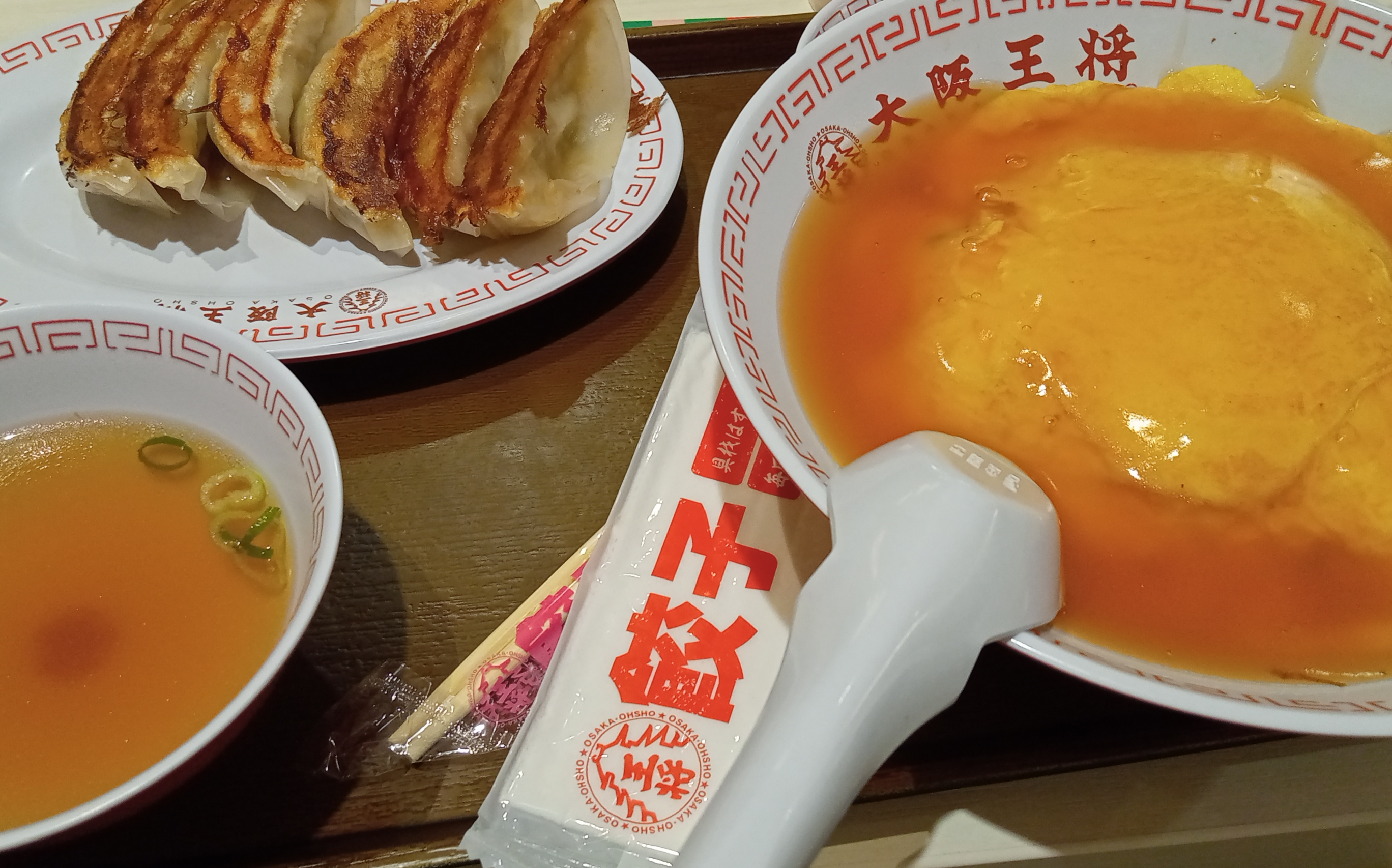

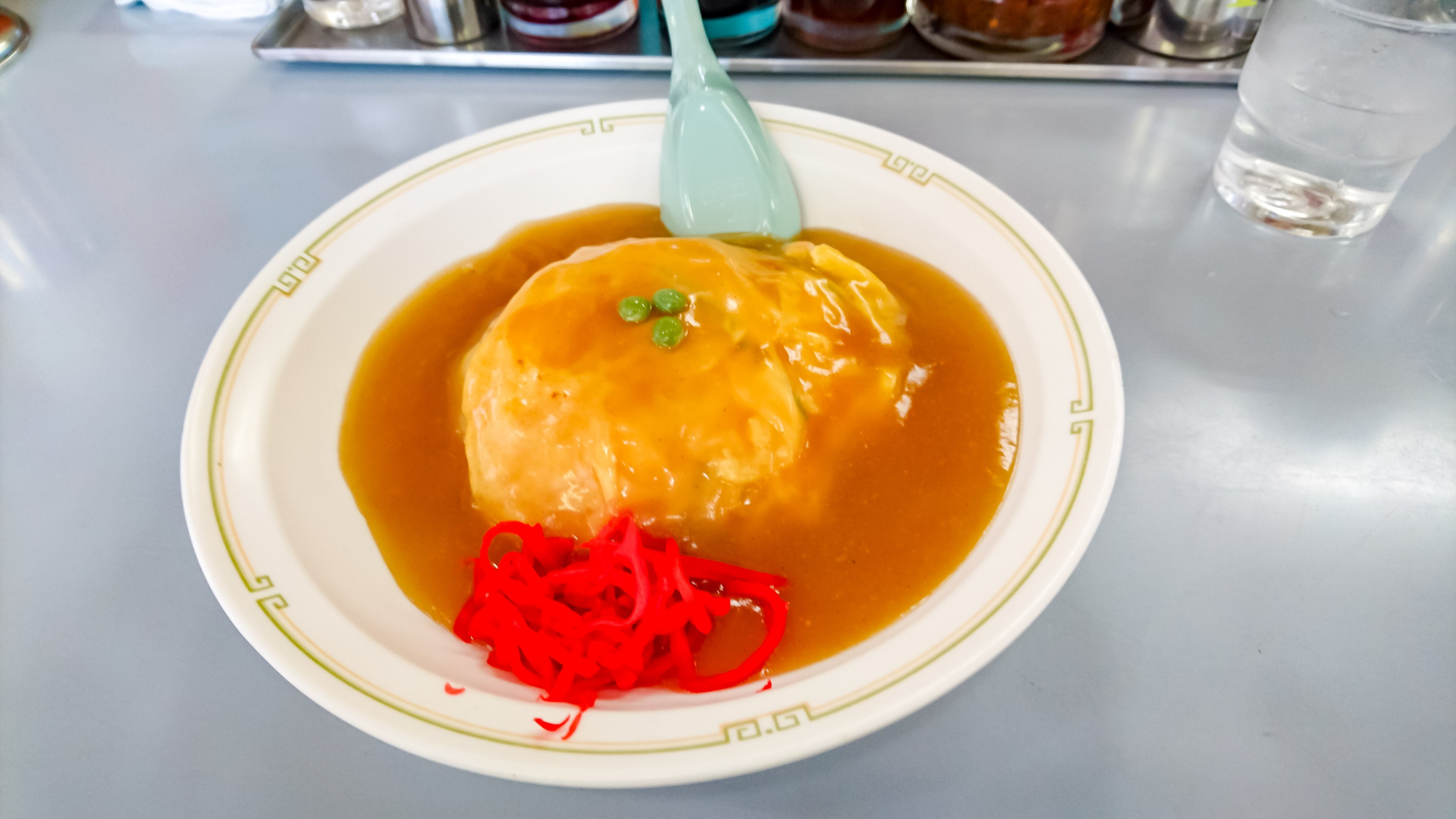

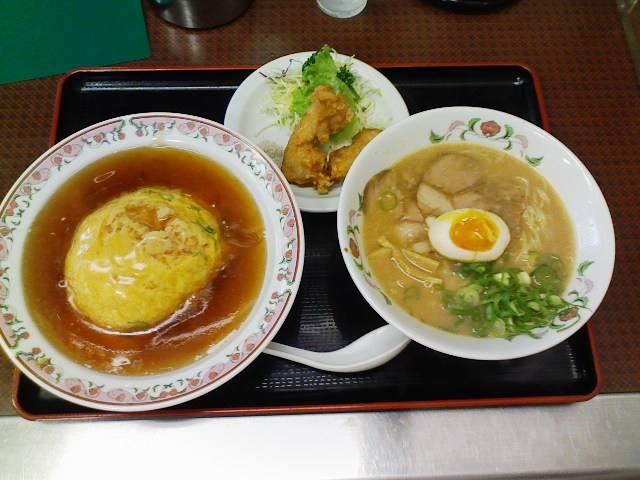

== See also ==
- Egg foo young
