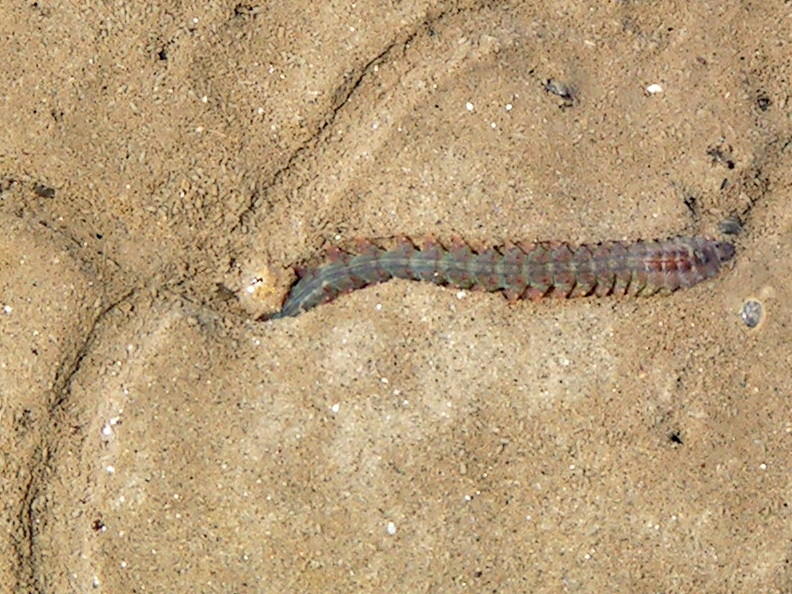
- Hediste diversicolor

Scientific classification
- Kingdom: Animalia
- Phylum: Annelida
- Clade: Pleistoannelida
- Subclass: Errantia
- Order: Phyllodocida
- Family: Nereididae
- Subfamily: Nereidinae
- Genus: Hediste; Malmgren, 1867

= Hediste =

Genus of annelid worms

Hediste is a genus of annelids belonging to the family Nereididae.

The species of this genus are found in Europe, Japan and Northern America.

== Species ==
Species in this genus include:

- Hediste atoka Sato & Nakashima, 2003
- Hediste diadroma Sato & Nakashima, 2003
- Hediste diversicolor (O. F. Müller, 1776)
