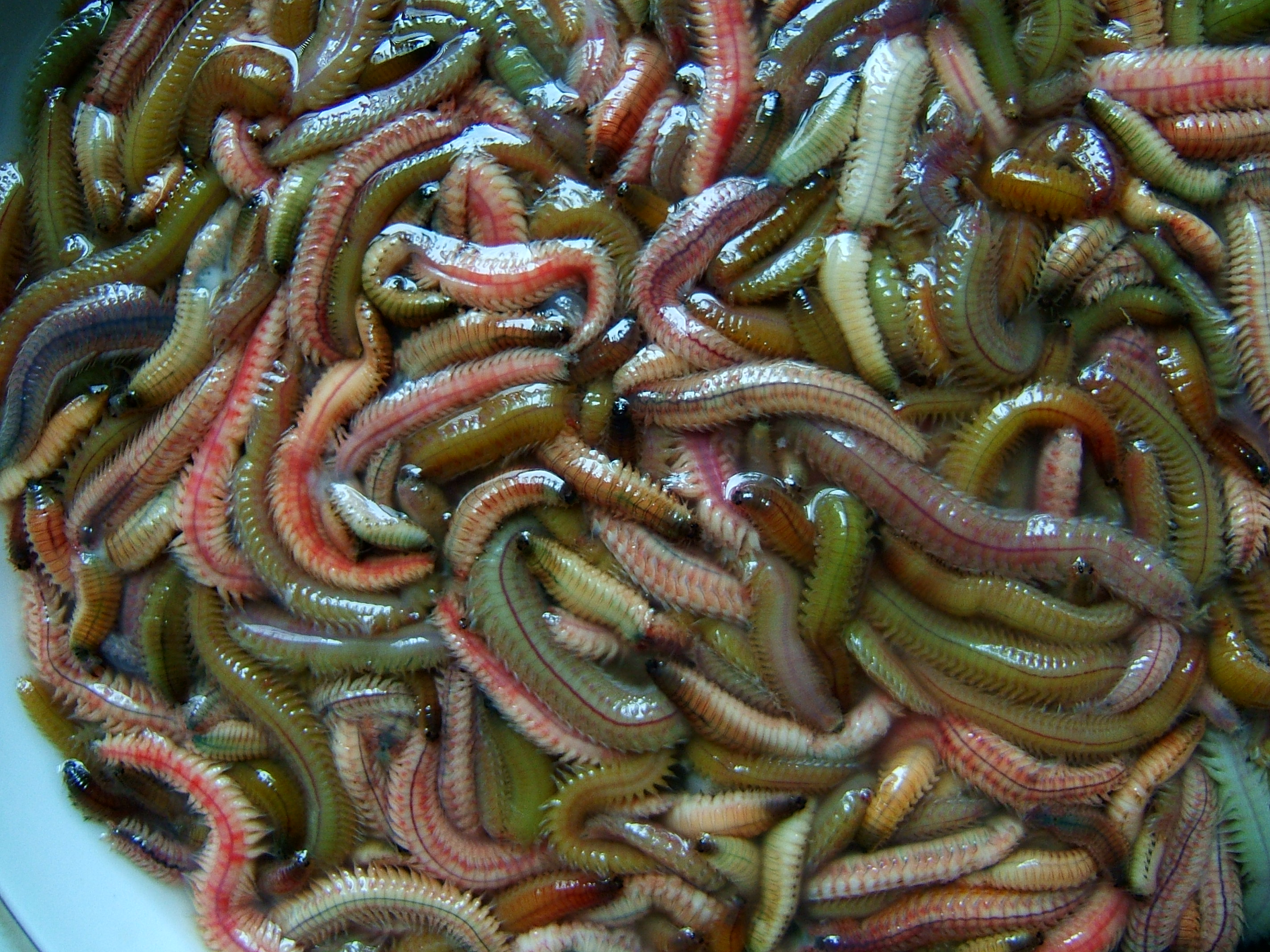
- Tylorrhynchus heterochetus

Scientific classification
- Domain: Eukaryota
- Kingdom: Animalia
- Phylum: Annelida
- Clade: Pleistoannelida
- Subclass: Errantia
- Order: Phyllodocida
- Family: Nereididae
- Subfamily: Gymnonereidinae
- Genus: Tylorrhynchus; Grubbe, 1866

= Tylorrhynchus =

Genus of annelid worms

Tylorrhynchus is a genus of polychaetes belonging to the family Nereididae. They are also known as ragworms.

== Species ==
Species accepted by World Register of Marine Species as of December 2023:

- Tylorrhynchus heterochetus (Quatrefages, 1866)
- Tylorrhynchus osawai (Izuka, 1903)
