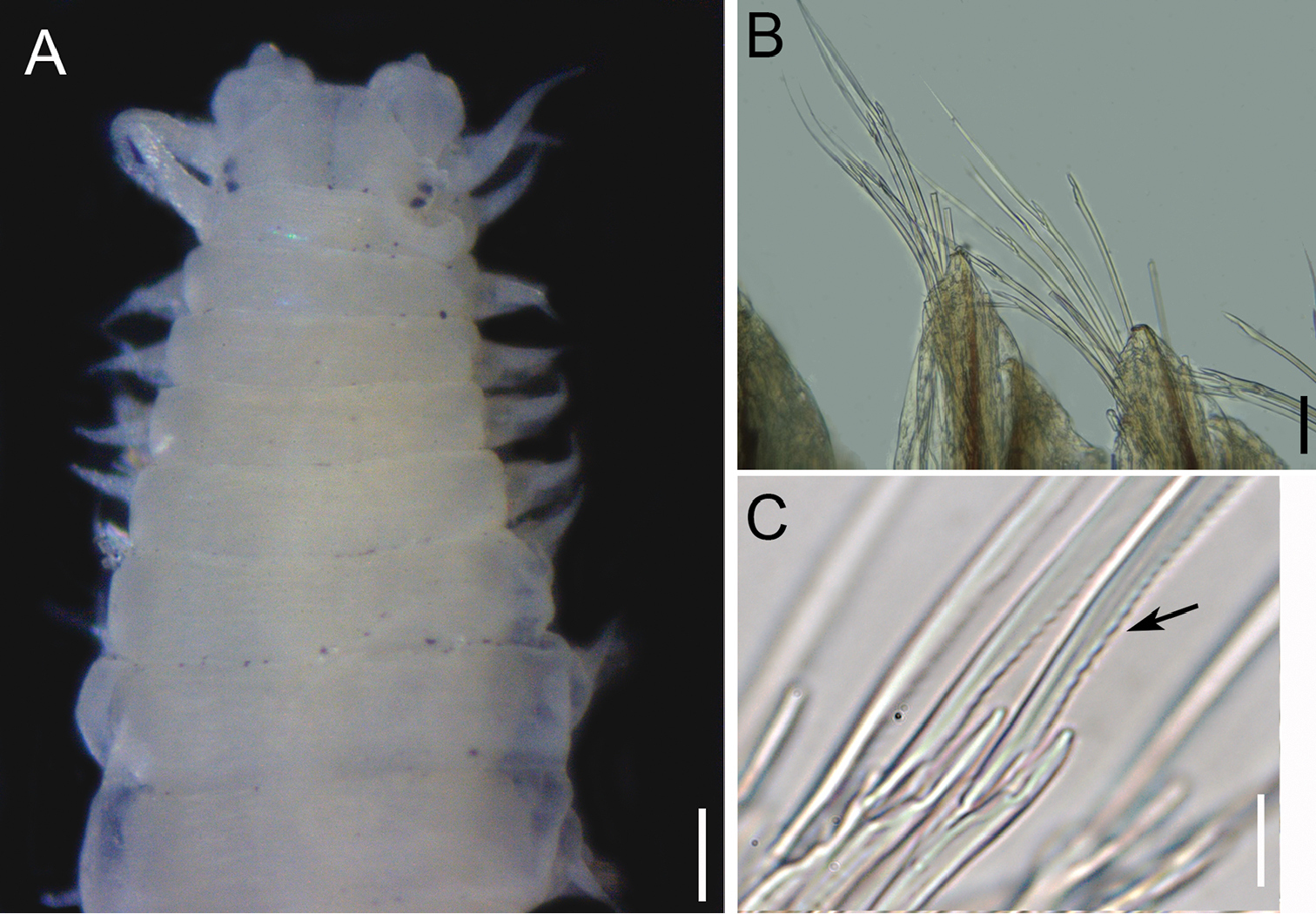
- Namalycastis geayi

Scientific classification
- Kingdom: Animalia
- Phylum: Annelida
- Clade: Pleistoannelida
- Subclass: Errantia
- Order: Phyllodocida
- Family: Nereididae
- Subfamily: Namanereidinae
- Genus: Namalycastis; Hartman, 1959

= Namalycastis =

Genus of annelid worms

Namalycastis is a genus of polychaetes belonging to the family Nereididae.

The genus has almost cosmopolitan distribution.

Species:

- Namalycastis abiuma (Grube, 1872)
- Namalycastis arista Glasby, 1999
- Namalycastis borealis Glasby, 1999
- Namalycastis brevicornis (Audouin & Milne Edwards, 1833)
- Namalycastis caetensis Alves & Santos, 2016
- Namalycastis elobeyensis Glasby, 1999
- Namalycastis fauveli Nageswara Rao, 1981
- Namalycastis geayi (Gravier, 1901)
- Namalycastis glasbyi Fernando & Rajasekaran, 2007
- Namalycastis hawaiiensis (Johnson, 1903)
- Namalycastis indica (Southern, 1921)
- Namalycastis intermedia Glasby, 1999
- Namalycastis jaya Magesh, Kvist & Glasby, 2012
- Namalycastis kartaboensis (Treadwell, 1926)
- Namalycastis longicirris (Takahashi, 1933)
- Namalycastis macroplatis Glasby, 1999
- Namalycastis meraukensis (Horst, 1918)
- Namalycastis multiseta Glasby, 1999
- Namalycastis nicoleae Glasby, 1999
- Namalycastis nipae (Pflugfelder, 1933)
- Namalycastis rhodochorde Glasby, Miura, Nishi & Junardi, 2007
- Namalycastis rigida Pillai, 1965
- Namalycastis senegalensis (Saint-Joseph, 1901)
- Namalycastis siolii (Corrêa, 1948)
- Namalycastis terrestris (Pflugfelder, 1933)
- Namalycastis vivax (Pflugfelder, 1933)
