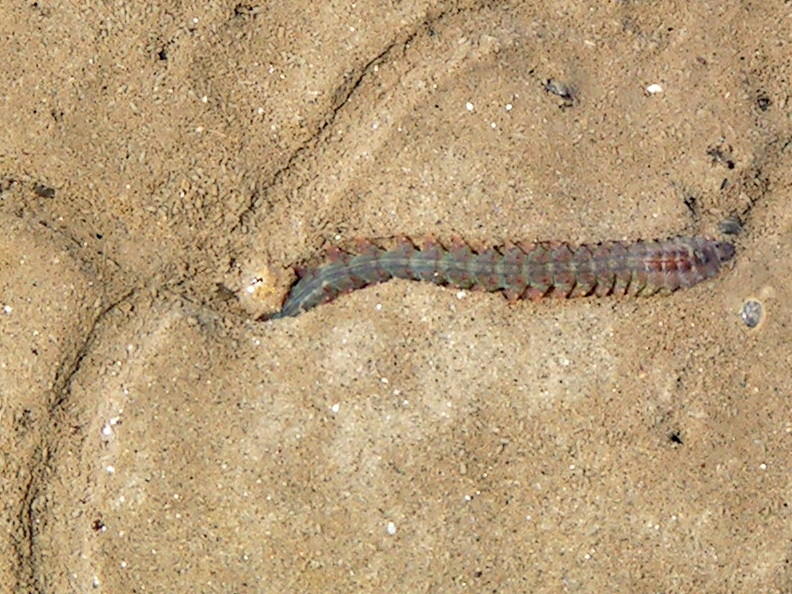

Scientific classification
- Kingdom: Animalia
- Phylum: Annelida
- Clade: Pleistoannelida
- Subclass: Errantia
- Order: Phyllodocida
- Family: Nereididae
- Genus: Hediste
- Species: H. diversicolor

Binomial name
- Hediste diversicolor (O. F. Müller, 1776)

Synonyms
- Neanthes diversicolor (Müller, 1776); Nereis (Hediste) diversicolor O. F. Müller, 1776; Nereis brevimanus Johnston, 1840; Nereis depressa Frey & Leuckart, 1847; Nereis diversicolor (Müller, 1776); Nereis sarsii Rathke, 1843; Nereis versicolor Müller; Nereis viridis Johnston, 1840

= Hediste diversicolor =

Species of annelid worm

Hediste diversicolor, commonly known as a ragworm, is a polychaete worm in the family Nereididae. It lives in a burrow in the sand or mud of beaches and estuaries in intertidal zones in the north Atlantic. This species is used in research, but its classification is in dispute; in the literature, it is often classified as Nereis diversicolor (O.F. Müller, 1776). Its specific name "diversicolor" refers to the fact that its colour changes from brown to green as the breeding season approaches.

== Description ==
Hediste diversicolor can grow up to 10 cm (4 in) in length and may have from ninety to one hundred twenty segments when mature. The head has a pair of palps, two pairs of antennae, four pairs of tentacles and four eyes. Each body segment has a pair of bristly appendages known as parapodia which are used for swimming. There is a prominent blood vessel running along the dorsal surface of the animal. This ragworm is pale brown but changes to green as the gonads mature and the breeding season approaches.

== Distribution and habitat ==
Hediste diversicolor is native to the north-east Atlantic. Its range extends from the Baltic Sea and North Sea southwards to the Azores and Mediterranean Sea. It has been introduced to the north-west Atlantic in the areas of Cobscook Bay, the Gulf of Maine and the Gulf of St Lawrence. It is plentiful on beaches of sand, muddy sand and mud, including areas of low salinity, where it lives in a semi-permanent J-shaped or U-shaped burrow and under adjoining stones in the intertidal zone.

== Biology ==
Examination of the contents of the gut shows that Hediste diversicolor is a predator and generalist scavenger, able to adapt its diet to whatever is currently available. It spins a mucus net at the entrance of its burrow in which it traps phytoplankton, zooplankton, diatoms, bacteria and other small particles. It creates a water current through its tube by writhing about inside to draw particles through the net. Periodically it rolls the net up and swallows it before spinning another. When the availability of suitably-sized food particles is low it emerges from its burrow and hunts for small invertebrates, seizing them with its strong jaws. It also eats detritus and even animal faeces. They also draw, otherwise not edible, cordgrass seeds into their burrows and let them sprout to produce high-quality food, one of the rare examples of “gardening” by animals.

The sexes are separate in Hediste diversicolor, and females heavily outnumber the males. As the breeding season approaches, the males, which were previously indistinguishable from the females, turn bright green. At the same time, the females turn a duller dark green on the dorsal surface with their earlier orange-brown pigmentation still showing through. Eggs develop within the female's body cavity. Histolysis then occurs and the body wall becomes brittle and eventually bursts, liberating the eggs into the burrow.

Synchronized spawning takes place in early spring, usually at the time of the new or full moon when the water has warmed up after the winter and attained a temperature above 6 °C (43 °F). The timing of this event varies throughout the worm's range and more southern populations mature at a year of age while more northerly ones may be three years old before they breed. The male seems to be attracted to a burrow occupied by a female by the release of a pheromone into the water. He crawls across the seabed and liberates sperm into the water just outside the entrance of the female's burrow. The sperm is drawn into the tube by the water current that the female creates by undulating her body. Here fertilisation takes place and the larvae are brooded for ten to fourteen days. Both males and females die after spawning.

== Ecology ==
Hediste diversicolor is widespread and common and is eaten by many species of birds and fish. It is the main food item for the pied avocet (Recurvirostra avosetta), the grey plover (Pluvialis squatarola), the curlew sandpiper (Calidris ferruginea), the bar-tailed godwit (Limosa lapponica) and the curlew (Numenius arquata). Several flatfish which live on intertidal mudflats feed on the ragworm. These include the common dab (Limanda limanda), the common sole (Solea solea), the European flounder (Platichthys flesus) and the European plaice (Pleuronectes platessa).

Hediste diversicolor has been found to have a deleterious effect on the establishment of saltmarshes. When tests were undertaken in southern England on establishing the seagrass Zostera noltei, it was found that efforts were more successful when the ragworm was excluded from the area of transplanted material. In another planting trial, the pioneering cordgrass Spartina anglica, used to prevent coastal erosion, was similarly adversely affected. In the laboratory, ragworms were seen to pull leaves of the grasses into their burrows where they fed on them, and the disturbance to the substrate caused by their burrowing activities was also thought to contribute to the reduced establishment rates.

== Uses ==
Hediste diversicolor is used as a model laboratory animal for research. It has also been used to evaluate the quality of marine sediment because it bioaccumulates certain heavy metals such as lead, cadmium, chromium and arsenic. Anglers use it for bait when sea fishing, digging it out of the substrate with a large fork. It is also available commercially.
