= Cơm tấm =

Vietnamese rice dish

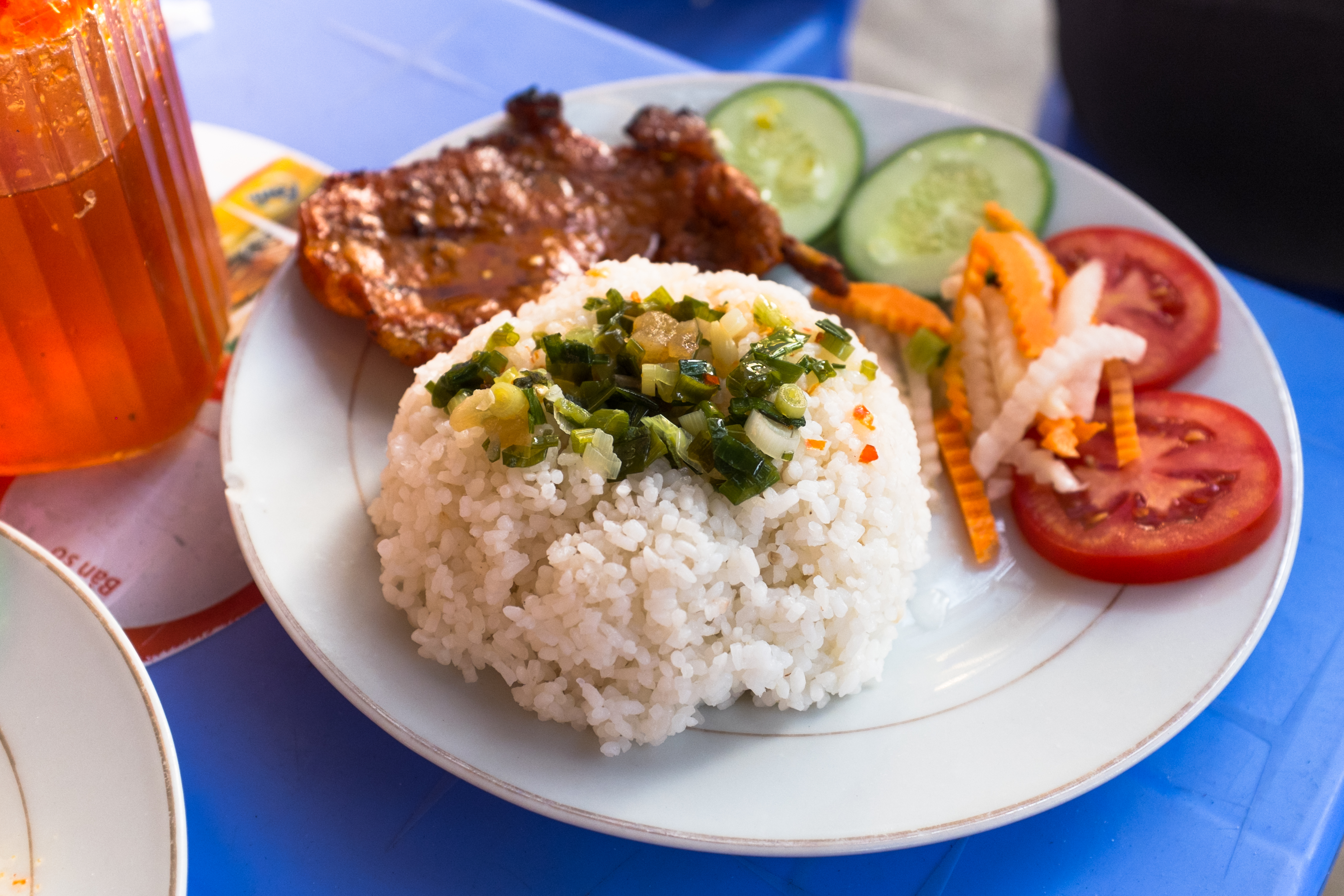
- Cơm tấm served with grilled pork and fish sauce.
- Alternative names: Cơm sườn
- Course: Breakfast; Lunch; Dinner
- Place of origin: Vietnam
- Region or state: Southern Vietnam
- Main ingredients: Broken rice, grilled rib, fish sauce with sugar, pickled carrots, oil garnish

Cơm tấm (Vietnamese: [kəːm tə̌m]), also referred as cơm sườn, is a Vietnamese dish made from broken rice, ribs, cucumbers, and pickled carrots, often served with sweet and sour fish sauce. Tấm refers to the broken rice grains, while cơm refers to cooked rice. Although there are varied names like cơm tấm Sài Gòn (Saigon broken rice), particularly for Saigon, the main ingredients remain the same for most cases.

== History ==
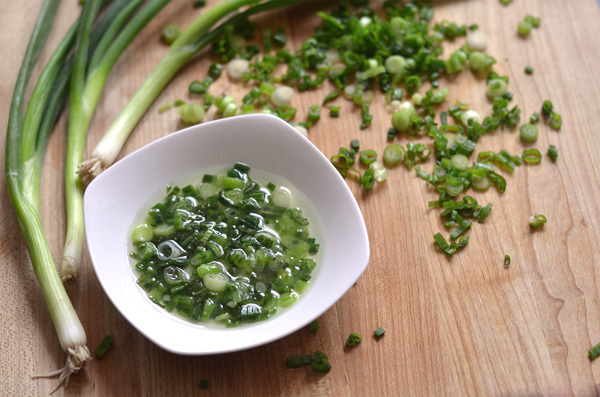
Vietnamese scallions and oil garnish used on top of Cơm Tấm

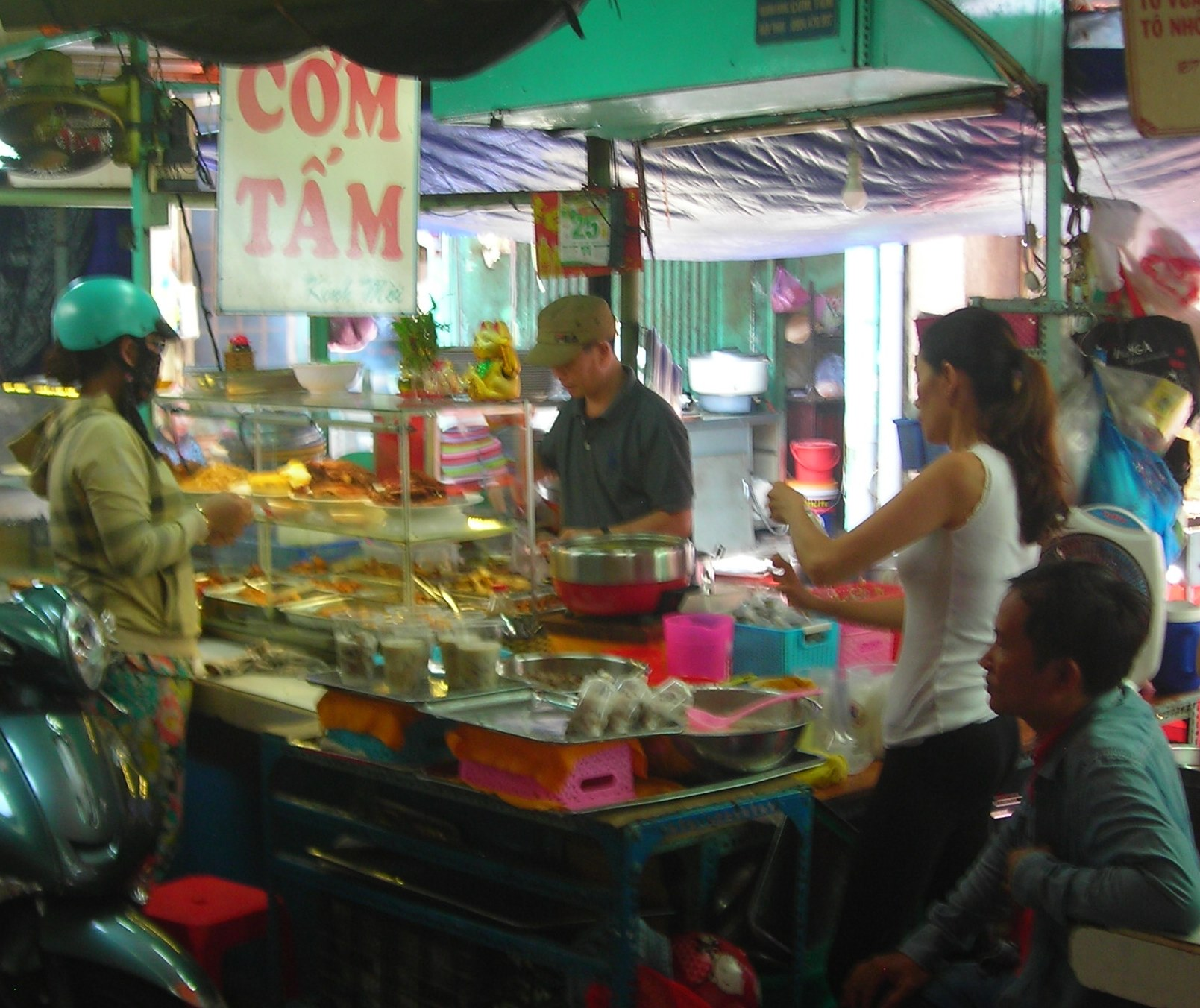
Cơm Tấm stall on the street.

Cơm Tấm emerged as a popular dish among poor rice farmers in the Mekong Delta. During bad rice seasons, there was not enough whole rice to sell, so they used broken rice to cook. Broken rice is fragments of rice grains broken during the handling processes and was regarded as inferior rice at the time.

Since Vietnam's urbanization in the first half of the 20th century, Cơm Tấm became popular across Southern provinces, including Saigon. In Saigon, which hosted large populations from a range of nations outside Vietnam, food sellers adapted Cơm Tấm to the palates of French, American, Chinese, and Indian customers, among others. As a result, grilled pork, chả trứng (Vietnamese-style steamed omelette with pork) was added to Cơm Tấm. Also, the portion started being served on plates with a fork instead of in traditional bowls with chopsticks. Nowadays, Cơm Tấm is a "standardized part of the Saigon culture", so much that there is a common metaphorical saying (translated from Vietnamese): "Saigon people eat Cơm Tấm like Ha Noi people eat Phở".

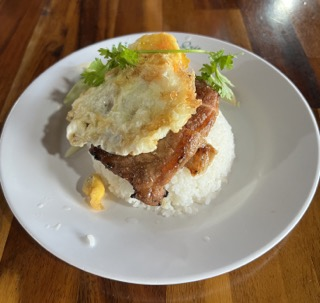
Cơm Tấm served at restaurants

== Ingredients ==
Although there are many variations of Cơm Tấm that have different ingredients and styles, a popular, featured Cơm Tấm dish commonly known as "Cơm Tấm Sườn Bì Chả" has the following ingredients:

- Broken Rice – a traditionally cheaper grade of rice produced by fragmentation in milling. It is mainly used as a food industry ingredient in America and Europe, but in West Africa and Southeast Asia is used for direct human consumption. This is the main ingredient of Cơm Tấm.
- Sườn nướng – Translated as grilled pork ribs, but there are two common varieties: grilled pork chops, and grilled pork ribs, which is also called "sườn non".
- Bì – thin strands of pork and cooked pork skin seasoned with roast rice powder
- Chả trứng – Vietnamese-style steamed omelet with meatloaf. Nowadays this may be substituted with an omelet or fried egg
- Scallion and oil garnish – chopped scallion lightly fried in heated oil until softened (serve both scallion and oil)
- Various vegetables, such as sliced cucumber and tomato, and pickled vegetables such as carrot and radish pickles
- Mixed fish sauce (Nước mắm pha) – a sweet, sour, salty, savory or spicy sauce served in a small bowl beside the Cơm Tấm dish. This ingredient is commonly considered an important part of a Cơm Tấm dish

== Serving ==
Although chopsticks are commonly used by Vietnamese, Cơm Tấm are eaten with a fork and spoon; and although the mixed fish sauce is commonly used for dipping in other Vietnamese dishes, for Cơm Tấm, the sauce is for spreading onto the dish as needed.

== Honors ==
Cơm Tấm is one of 10 Vietnamese dishes recognized by the Asia Record Organisation (ARO) as having important culinary value to the international community.

== See also ==
- Bánh mì
- Phở
- List of Vietnamese culinary specialities
- List of Vietnamese dishes
