= Sườn nướng =

Vietnamese grilled pork chops

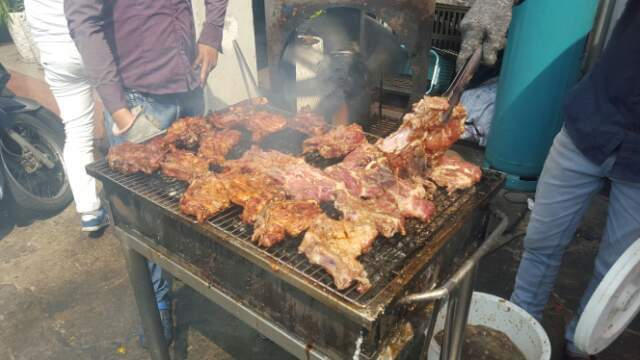
- Grilling pork ribs in Ho Chi Minh City, Vietnam
- Place of origin: Vietnam
- Associated cuisine: Vietnamese cuisine
- Main ingredients: Pork chops

Sườn nướng (lit. 'grilled ribs') is Vietnamese marinated charcoal-grilled pork chop.

== Preparation ==
Flat pieces of pork chops are seasoned with lemongrass and fish sauce, glazed with liquid caramel, and charcoal-grilled.

== Serving ==
Sườn nướng is often served on top of cooked rice. The dish is called cơm sườn nướng, as cơm refers to "cooked rice" in Vietnamese. It can also be served on top of cơm tấm (broken rice).

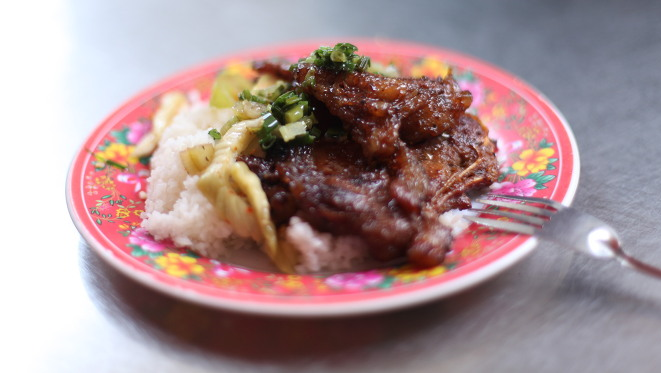
Cơm sườn nướng

== See also ==
- Bay sach chruk
- Galbi – grilled ribs in Korean cuisine
- List of Vietnamese dishes
