= Brewers rice =

Milled fragments of rice kernels

Brewers' rice is the small milled fragments of rice kernels that have been separated from the larger kernels of milled rice.

Brewers' rice and second heads are two of the many byproducts that rice milling creates. Second heads are milled rice kernels that are one-half to three-quarters of the size of original kernel. Brewers' rice is a milled rice kernel that is one-quarter the size of a full kernel. Second heads, depending on their quality, are mostly used to make rice flour, whereas brewers' rice is used in beermaking and production of other fermented products, and for pet food. "If the quality of the second heads are poor, they will be sold for pet food or dairy feed. Brewers rice is sold for pet food and dairy feed exclusively." since it is not considered aesthetically pleasing enough for human consumption. However, it offers the same nutritional value as white rice.
