= Nicon (annelid) =

Scientific classification
- Kingdom: Animalia
- Phylum: Annelida
- Clade: Pleistoannelida
- Subclass: Errantia
- Order: Phyllodocida
- Family: Nereididae
- Subfamily: Nereidinae
- Genus: Nicon; Kinberg, 1865

Genus of annelid worms

Nicon is a genus of polychaetes belonging to the family Nereididae.

The species of this genus are found in Southern Hemisphere.

Species:

- Nicon abyssalis Hartman, 1967
- Nicon aestuariensis Knox, 1951
- Nicon japonicus Imajima, 1972
