= Nikon (given name) =

Nikon is a given name from Greek: Νίκων. Notable people with the name include:

- Nikon the Metanoeite (c. 930–c. 998), a Byzantine monk, preacher and saint
- Nikon of the Black Mountain (c. 1025–c. 1100), a Byzantine ecclesiastical writer
- Nikon of Jerusalem (c. 1380 – after 1468), Serbian writer
- Nikon I (Serbian patriarch), patriarch from 1419 to 1435
- Patriarch Nikon of Moscow (1605–1681), a Russian prelate
- Nikon of Karoulia (1875–1963), Russian military officer and Orthodox monk
- Nikon Liolin (born 1945), Albanian bishop in the United States
- Nikon Nizetas, cover name of WW1 spy Alfred Redl
