= Chả rươi =

Vietnamese dish of fried sand worms

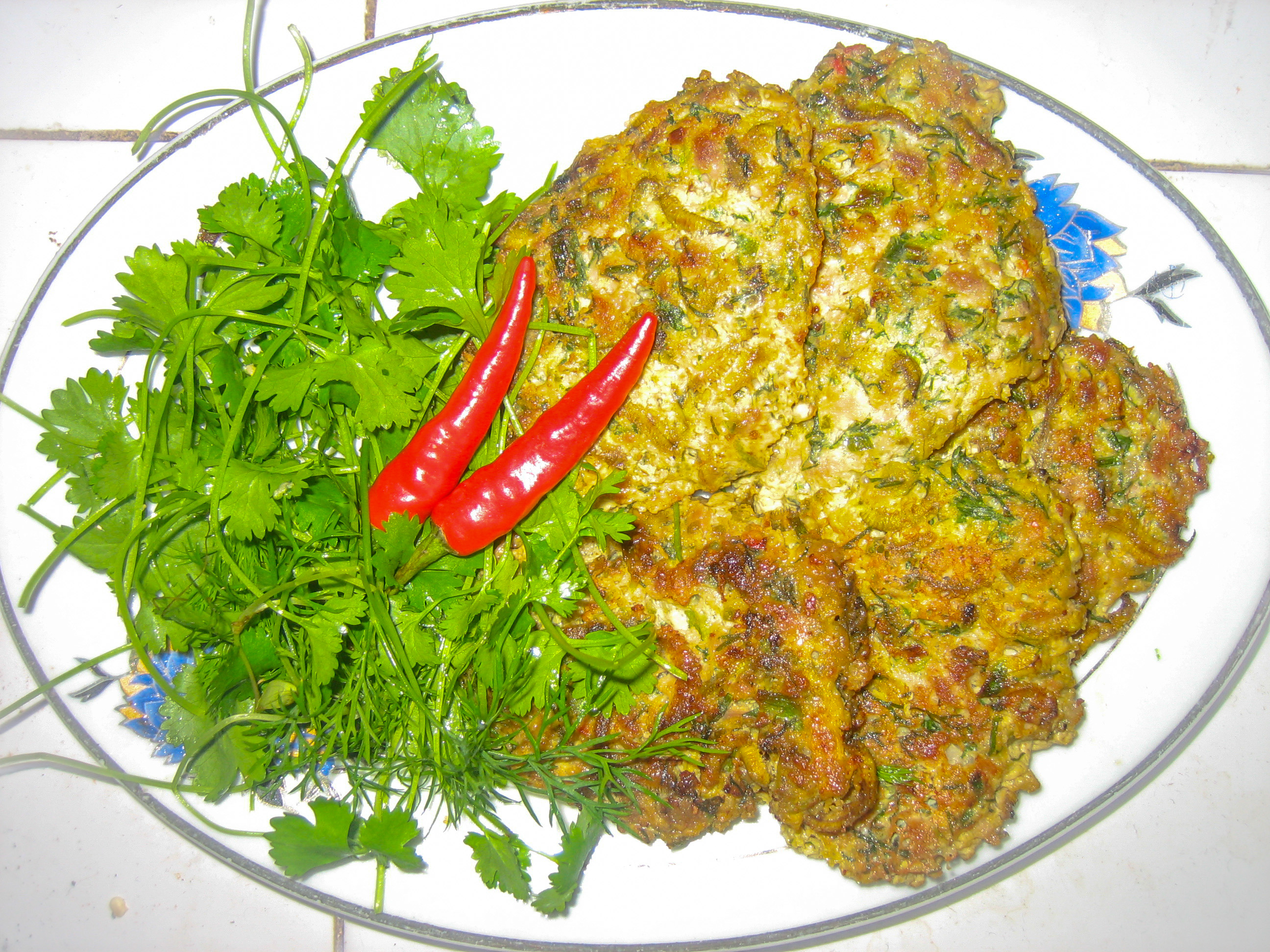
- Course: Entree
- Place of origin: Vietnam
- Associated cuisine: Vietnamese
- Similar dishes: Chả trứng

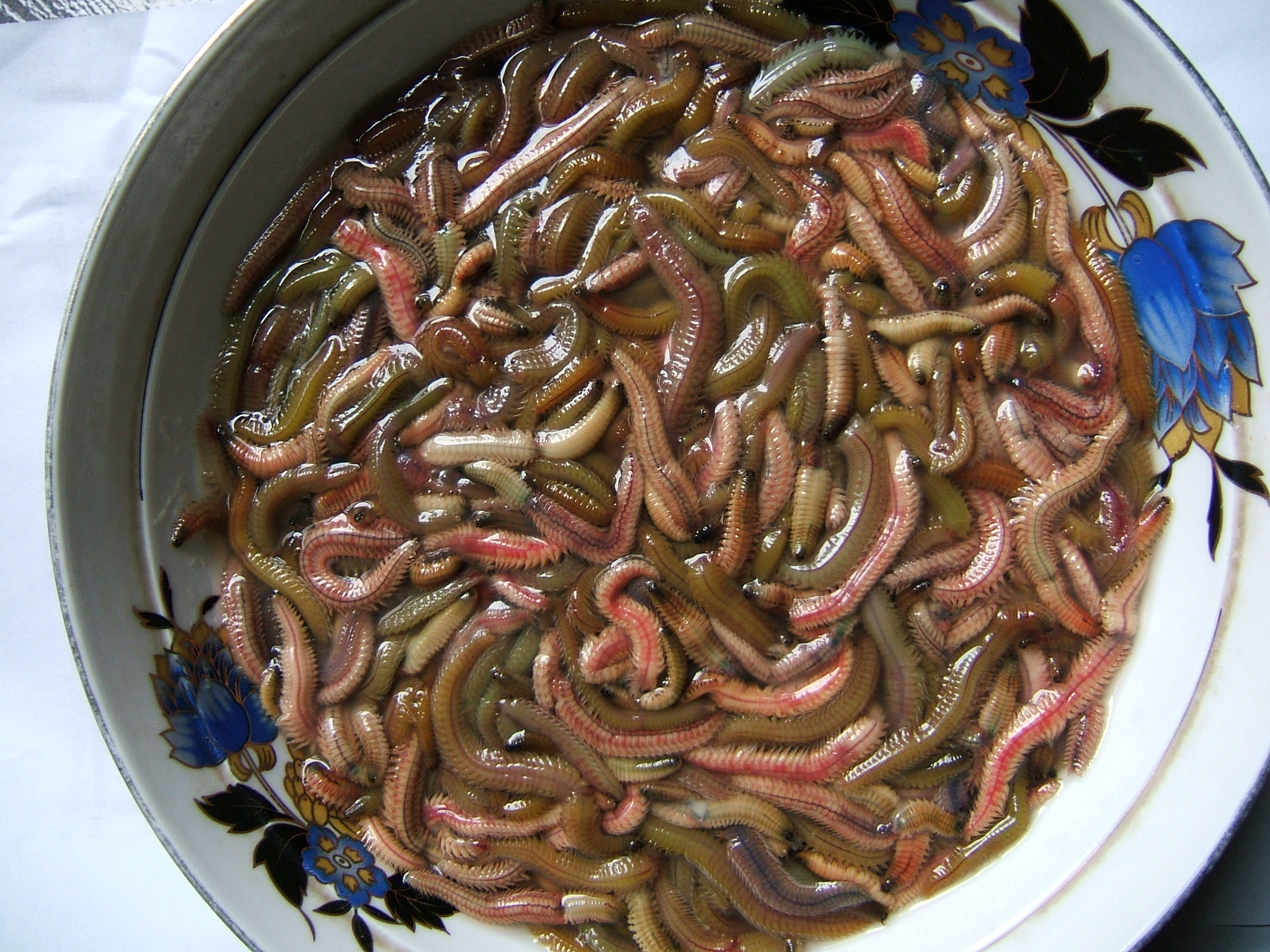
The sand worms before preparation

Chả rươi (sand worm omelette) is a Vietnamese dish made from the polychaete worm Tylorrhynchus heterochetus; it is a delicacy of some provinces in Northern Vietnam. The dish is prepared from live sand worms, which are put in hot water to remove their tentacles, and then mixed with raw egg. Onions, mandarin peels and various spices are added, and the mixture is then fried until it obtains a crispy brown surface.

Because sandworms can only be found in autumn, the dish is not available year-round; as such, is considered a specialty during the autumn. Some vendors use frozen sandworms to be able to serve the dish year-round, but the taste of the fresh sandworms is considered superior. The sand worms are caught from mangroves in Hai Phong.
