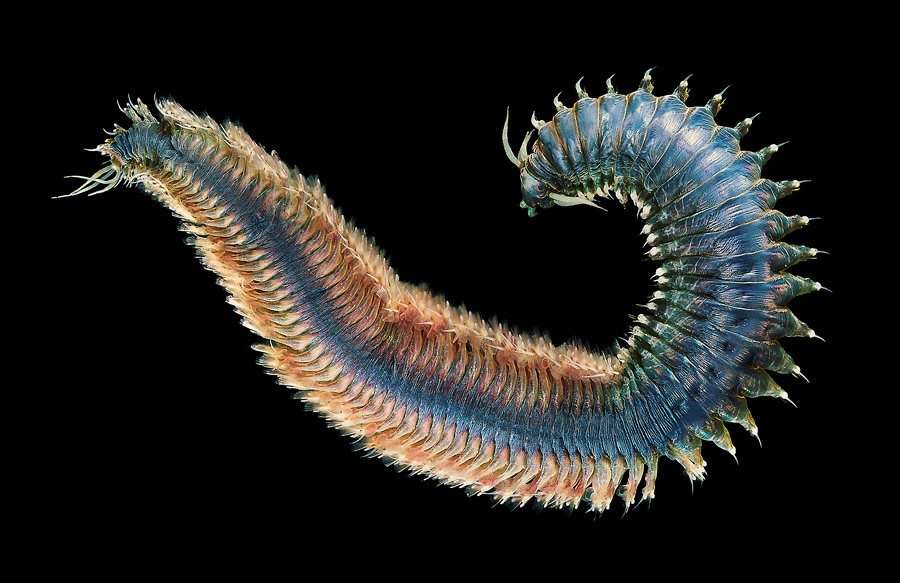
- Nereis pelagica

Scientific classification
- Kingdom: Animalia
- Phylum: Annelida
- Clade: Pleistoannelida
- Subclass: Errantia
- Order: Phyllodocida
- Family: Nereididae
- Subfamily: Nereidinae
- Genus: Nereis; Linnaeus, 1758

Type species
- Nereis pelagica Linnaeus, 1758

= Nereis =

Genus of annelid worms

Nereis is a genus of polychaete worms in the family Nereididae. It comprises many species, most of which are marine. Nereis possess setae and parapodia for locomotion and gas exchange. They may have two types of setae, which are found on the parapodia. Acicular setae provide support. Locomotor setae are for crawling, and are the bristles that are visible on the exterior of the Polychaeta. They are cylindrical in shape, found not only in sandy areas, and they are adapted to burrow. They often cling to seagrass (posidonia) or other grass on rocks and sometimes gather in large groups.

Nereis worms are commonly known as rag worms or clam worms. The body is long, slender, and dorso-ventrally flattened, reaching a length of 5-30 cm. The head consists of two parts: a roughly triangular anterior lobe—the prostomium—and a posterior ring-like portion—the peristomium. The latter bears four pairs of tentacular cirri, dorsally two pairs of eyes, and ventrally a pair of short two-jointed palps. Sometimes they are confused with myriapods.

== Etymology ==
The scientific Latin genus name Nereis derives from the Ancient Greek Νηρηΐς : Nērēís (stem Νηρηΐδ- : Nērēid), a sea nymph.

== Ecology ==
Nereis are osmoconformers. They are dioecious (individuals are male or female) and they release their haploid gametes into the water, a process called spawning. Moreover, upon fertilization and mitotic divisions of the zygote, Nereids form a larval stage which is similar to that of molluscs – i.e. a trochophore larva.

== Species ==
The genus Nereis contains the following species:

- Nereis abbreviata Holly, 1935
- Nereis abyssa Imajima, 2009
- Nereis abyssicola (Horst, 1924)
- Nereis acustris Linnaeus, 1767
- Nereis aegyptia (Savigny in Lamarck, 1818)
- Nereis aestuarensis Knox, 1951
- Nereis aibuhitensis (Grube, 1878)
- Nereis albipes Grube, 1873
- Nereis allenae Pettibone, 1956
- Nereis amoyensis (Treadwell, 1936)
- Nereis angelensis Fauchald, 1972
- Nereis angusta (Kinberg, 1866)
- Nereis angusticollis Augener, 1913
- Nereis angusticollis Kinberg, 1866
- Nereis annularis Blainville, 1818
- Nereis anoculis Hartman, 1960
- Nereis anoculopsis Fauchald, 1972
- Nereis anodonta Schmarda, 1861
- Nereis antipoda Knox, 1960
- Nereis apaliae Wilson, 1985
- Nereis arenaceodonta
- Nereis arroyensis Treadwell, 1901
- Nereis atlantica McIntosh, 1885
- Nereis augeneri Gravier & Dantan, 1934
- Nereis badiotorquata (Grube, 1878)
- Nereis baliensis (Horst, 1924)
- Nereis baolingi Leon-Gonzalez & Solis-Weiss, 2000
- Nereis batjanensis (Horst, 1924)
- Nereis bifida Hutchings & Turvey, 1982
- Nereis bipartita (Bobretzky, 1868)
- Nereis blainvillei delle Chiaje, 1828
- Nereis broa Lana & Sovierzovsky, 1987
- Nereis buitendijki (Horst, 1924)
- Nereis caecoides Hartman, 1965
- Nereis caerulea Linnaeus, 1758
- Nereis cagliari Kinberg, 1866
- Nereis calamus Renier, 1804
- Nereis callaona (Grube, 1857)
- Nereis caparti Fauvel, 1953
- Nereis casoae Leon-Gonzalez & Solis-Weiss, 2001
- Nereis castelnaui Quatrefages, 1866
- Nereis caudata
- Nereis caudipunctata (Grube, 1857)
- Nereis caymanensis Fauchald, 1977
- Nereis chlorodes Blanchard in Gay, 1849
- Nereis chrysocephala Pallas, 1788
- Nereis cirrhigera Viviani, 1805
- Nereis cirriseta Hutchings & Turvey, 1982
- Nereis cockburnenesis Augener, 1913
- Nereis contorta Dalyell, 1853
- Nereis corallina Kinberg, 1866
- Nereis cornuta Quatrefages, 1866
- Nereis costaricaensis Dean, 2001
- Nereis coutieri Gravier, 1900
- Nereis coutieri Gravier, 1899
- Nereis crassa Gmelin in Linnaeus, 1788
- Nereis crocea Renier, 1804
- Nereis cuprea delle Chiaje, 1822
- Nereis cuprea (Schmarda, 1861)
- Nereis cylindraria
- Nereis dakarensis Fauvel, 1951
- Nereis dayana Sun & Shen in Sun, Wu & Shen, 1978
- Nereis delagica Gmelin in Linnaeus, 1788
- Nereis delicatula Blanchard in Gay, 1849
- Nereis delli Knox, 1960
- Nereis denhamensis Augener, 1913
- Nereis donghaiensis He & Wu, 1988
- Nereis dorsolobata Hartmann-Schröder, 1965
- Nereis edwardsii delle Chiaje, 1828
- Nereis ehlersiana (Grube, 1878)
- Nereis ehrenbergi Grube, 1868
- Nereis erythraeensis
- Nereis falcaria (Willey, 1905)
- Nereis falsa Quatrefages, 1866
- Nereis fauchaldi Leon-Gonzalez & Diaz-Castaneda, 1998
- Nereis fauveli Gravier & Dantan, 1934
- Nereis filicaudata Fauvel, 1951
- Nereis foliosa Schmarda, 1861
- Nereis fossae Fauchald, 1972
- Nereis frontalis Bosc, 1802
- Nereis funchalensis (Langerhans, 1880)
- Nereis fusifera Quatrefages, 1866
- Nereis garwoodi Gonzalez-Escalante & Salazar-Vallejo, 2003
- Nereis gayi Blanchard in Gay, 1849
- Nereis ghardaqae Hartmann-Schröder, 1960
- Nereis gigantea Linnaeus, 1767
- Nereis gisserana (Horst, 1924)
- Nereis goajirana Augener, 1933
- Nereis gracilis (Hansen, 1878)
- Nereis granulata Day, 1957
- Nereis gravieri Fauvel, 1900
- Nereis gravieri Fauvel, 1902
- Nereis grayi Pettibone, 1956
- Nereis grubei (Kinberg, 1866)
- Nereis guangdongensis Wu, Sun & Yang, 1981
- Nereis heterocirrata Treadwell, 1931
- Nereis heteromorpha (Horst, 1924)
- Nereis heterophylla Chamisso & Eysenhardt, 1821
- Nereis heteropoda Chamisso & Eysenhardt, 1821
- Nereis holochaeta Intes & Le Loeuff, 1975
- Nereis homogompha Rullier, 1972
- Nereis huanghaiensis Wu, Sun & Yang, 1981
- Nereis icosiensis Gravier & Dantan, 1928
- Nereis ignota Quatrefages, 1866
- Nereis imajimai Leon-Gonzalez & Diaz-Castaneda, 1998
- Nereis imbecillis Grube, 1840
- Nereis imperfecta Gravier & Dantan, 1936
- Nereis inflata Leon-Gonzalez & Solis-Weiss, 2001
- Nereis iris Stimpson, 1854
- Nereis irrorata
- Nereis izukai Okuda, 1939
- Nereis jacksoni Kinberg, 1866
- Nereis krebsii Grube, 1857
- Nereis lamellosa Ehlers, 1864
- Nereis languida Kinberg, 1866
- Nereis latescens Chamberlin, 1919
- Nereis leuca Chamberlin, 1919
- Nereis ligulata Hilbig, 1992
- Nereis lineata delle Chiaje, 1827
- Nereis lingulata Hilbig, 1992
- Nereis lithothamnica Annenkova, 1938
- Nereis litoralis Leach in Johnston, 1865
- Nereis longilingulis Monro, 1937
- Nereis longior Chlebovitsch & Wu, 1962
- Nereis longisetis McIntosh, 1885
- Nereis macropis Ehlers, 1920
- Nereis maculosa Renier, 1804
- Nereis madreporae
- Nereis margarita Montagu, 1804
- Nereis marginata Grube, 1857
- Nereis mariae Holly, 1935
- Nereis marioni Audouin & Milne-Edwards, 1833
- Nereis maroccensis Amoureux, 1976
- Nereis maxillodentata Hutchings & Turvey, 1982
- Nereis mediator Chamberlin, 1918
- Nereis mendocinana Chamberlin, 1919
- Nereis microcera Quatrefages, 1866
- Nereis minima Lamarck, 1801
- Nereis mirabilis Kinberg, 1866
- Nereis mollis Linnaeus, 1761
- Nereis monoceros Dalyell, 1853
- Nereis monroi Reish, 1953
- Nereis moroccensis Amoureux, 1976
- Nereis mortenseni Augener, 1923
- Nereis multignatha Imajima & Hartman, 1964
- Nereis myersi Holly, 1935
- Nereis nancaurica Ehlers, 1904
- Nereis nanciae Day, 1949
- Nereis natans Hartman, 1936
- Nereis neoneanthes Hartman, 1948
- Nereis neozealanica Knox, 1951
- Nereis nichollsi Kott, 1951
- Nereis nigripes Ehlers, 1868
- Nereis noctiluca Linnaeus, 1761
- Nereis nouhuysi Horst, 1918
- Nereis obscura Gravier & Dantan, 1934
- Nereis ochotica Grube, 1850
- Nereis ockenii delle Chiaje, 1828
- Nereis octentaculata Montagu, 1804
- Nereis oligohalina (Rioja, 1946)
- Nereis onychophora Horst, 1918
- Nereis otto delle Chiaje, 1828
- Nereis ovarius Read, 1980
- Nereis pachychaeta Fauvel, 1919
- Nereis panamensis Fauchald, 1977
- Nereis pannosa (Grube, 1857)
- Nereis parabifida Hutchings & Turvey, 1982
- Nereis paucignatha Hartman, 1940
- Nereis paulina Grube, 1868
- Nereis pectinata Dalyell, 1853
- Nereis pelagica Linnaeus, 1758
- Nereis perivisceralis Claparède, 1868
- Nereis peroniensis Kott, 1951
- Nereis persica Fauvel, 1911
- Nereis peruviana Ehlers, 1868
- Nereis phosphorescens Quatrefages, 1866
- Nereis phyllophorus Ross, 1819
- Nereis pinnata Müller, 1776
- Nereis piscesae Blake & Hillbig, 1990
- Nereis posidoniae Hutchings & Rainer, 1979
- Nereis procera Ehlers, 1868
- Nereis profundi Kirkegaard, 1956
- Nereis pseudomoniliformis Santos & Lana, 2003
- Nereis pulsatoria (Savigny, 1822)
- Nereis punctata Dalyell, 1853
- Nereis puncturata Grube, 1857
- Nereis quadricorna delle Chiaje, 1841
- Nereis quoyii Quatrefages, 1866
- Nereis radiata Viviani in Grube, 1850
- Nereis ranzani delle Chiaje, 1828
- Nereis rava Ehlers, 1864
- Nereis regia Quatrefages, 1866
- Nereis rigida Grube, 1857
- Nereis riisei Grube, 1857
- Nereis robusta Quatrefages, 1866
- Nereis rufa Pennant, 1812
- Nereis rupta Quatrefages, 1866
- Nereis sandersi Blake, 1985
- Nereis sarsoensis Hartmann-Schröder, 1960
- Nereis schmardae Hartmann-Schröder, 1962
- Nereis scolopendrina Blainville, 1825
- Nereis scolopendroides Hansen, 1882
- Nereis segrex Chamberlin, 1919
- Nereis semperiana (Grube, 1878)
- Nereis serrata Santos & Lana, 2003
- Nereis sertularias
- Nereis sieboldii Grube, 1873
- Nereis sinensis Wu, Sun & Yang, 1981
- Nereis singularis Wesenberg-Lund, 1949
- Nereis spinigera Hutchings & Turvey, 1982
- Nereis splendida Blainville, 1825
- Nereis splendida Grube, 1840
- Nereis sumbawaensis (Horst, 1924)
- Nereis surugaense Imajima, 1972
- Nereis talehsapensis Fauvel, 1932
- Nereis tenuipalpa Pflugfelder, 1933
- Nereis tenuis Webster & Benedict, 1884
- Nereis tethycola delle Chiaje, 1831
- Nereis thompsoni (Kott, 1951)
- Nereis thysanota Ehlers, 1920
- Nereis tiedmanni delle Chiaje, 1841
- Nereis tigrina Zachs, 1933
- Nereis toporoki Khlebovich, 1996
- Nereis torta Fauvel, 1934
- Nereis translucens Quatrefages, 1866
- Nereis triangularis Hutchings & Turvey, 1982
- Nereis tydemani (Horst, 1924)
- Nereis uncia Holly, 1935
- Nereis usticensis Cantone, Catalono & Badalamenti, 2003
- Nereis variegata Renier, 1804
- Nereis veleronis Hartman, 1940
- Nereis ventilabrum Quatrefages, 1866
- Nereis vexillosa Grube, 1851
- Nereis victoriana Augener, 1918
- Nereis villosa Dalyell, 1853
- Nereis vitiensis Grube, 1870
- Nereis willey Day, 1934
- Nereis zhongshaensis Shen & Sun in Sun, Wu & Shen, 1978
- Nereis zonata Malmgren, 1867
