= Ceratocephale =

Scientific classification
- Kingdom: Animalia
- Phylum: Annelida
- Clade: Pleistoannelida
- Subclass: Errantia
- Order: Phyllodocida
- Family: Nereididae
- Subfamily: Gymnonereidinae
- Genus: Ceratocephale; Malmgren, 1867

Genus of annelid worms

Ceratocephale is a genus of polychaetes belonging to the family Nereididae.

The species of this genus inhabit marine and brackish environments.

== Species ==
Species in this genus include:

- Ceratocephale abyssorum (Hartman & Fauchald, 1971)
- Ceratocephale andaman Hylleberg & Natewathana, 1988
