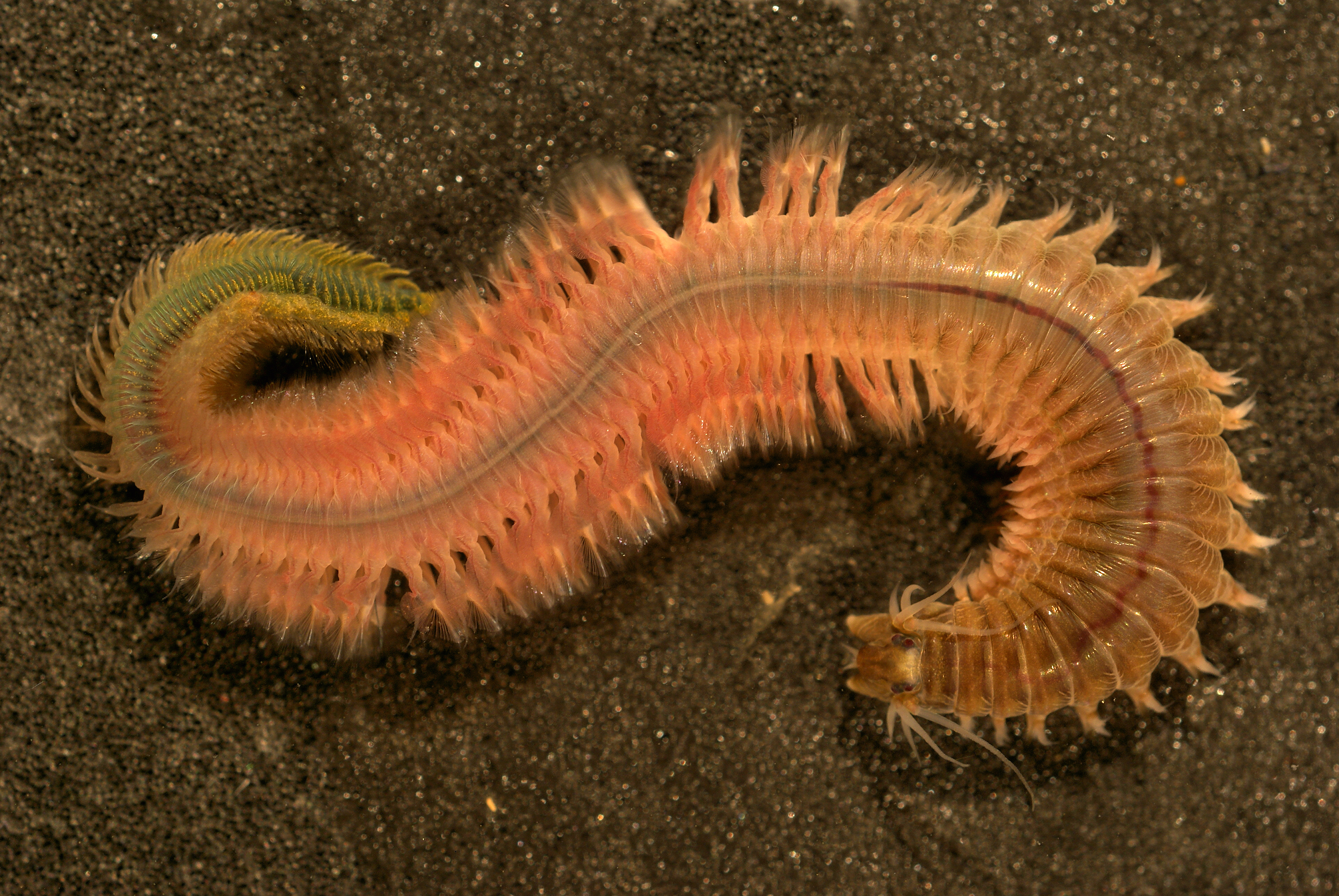
- Alitta succinea

Scientific classification
- Kingdom: Animalia
- Phylum: Annelida
- Clade: Pleistoannelida
- Subclass: Errantia
- Order: Phyllodocida
- Suborder: Nereidiformia
- Family: Nereididae; Blainville, 1818

= Nereididae =

Family of annelid worms

Nereididae (formerly spelled Nereidae) are a family of polychaete worms. It contains about 500 - mostly-marine - species grouped into 42 genera. They may be commonly called ragworms or clamworms.

== Characteristics ==
The prostomium of Nereididae bears a pair of palps that are differentiated into two units. The proximal unit is much larger than the distal unit. Parapodia are mostly-biramous (only the first two pairs are uniramous). Peristomium fused with the first body-segment, with usually two pairs of tentacular cirri. The first body-segment with 1-2 pairs tentacular cirri without aciculae. Compound setae are present. Notopodia are distinct (rarely reduced), usually with more flattened lobes, notosetae compound falcigers and/or spinigers (rarely notosetae absent). They have two prostomial antennae (absent in Micronereis). Their pharynx, when everted, clearly consists of two portions, with a pair of strong jaws on the distal portion and usually with conical teeth on one or more areas of both portions. Most genera have no gills (if present, they are usually branched and arise on mid-anterior segments of body). The larval body consists of four segments.

=== Jaw-material ===
Ragworms' teeth are made of a very tough, yet lightweight material. Unlike bone and tooth enamel, this is not mineralized with calcium, but is formed by a histidine-rich protein, with bound zinc ions. Research on this material could lead to applications in engineering.

== Systematics ==
Nereididae are currently considered a monophyletic taxon. Their closest neighbours in polychaete phylogenetic tree are Chrysopetalidae and Hesionidae (the superfamily Nereidoidea).

Nereididae are divided into 42 genera, but the relationships between them are as yet unclear. The family contains traditionally three subfamilies - Namanereidinae, Gymnonereinae and Nereidinae.

=== Genera ===
Subfamily Gymnonereidinae Banse, 1977

- Australonereis Hartman, 1954
- Ceratocephale Malmgren, 1867
- Dendronereides Southern, 1921
- Gymnonereis Horst, 1919
- Kinberginereis Pettibone, 1971
- Leptonereis Kinberg, 1865
- Micronereides Day, 1963
- Olganereis Hartmann-Schröder, 1977
- Rullierinereis Pettibone, 1971
- Sinonereis Wu & Sun, 1979
- Stenoninereis Wesenberg-Lund, 1958
- Tambalagamia Pillai, 1961
- Tylonereis Fauvel, 1911
- Tylorrhynchus Grube, 1866
- Typhlonereis Hansen, 1879
- Websterinereis Pettibone, 1971

Subfamily Namanereidinae Hartman, 1959

- Namalycastis Hartman, 1959
- Namanereis Chamberlin, 1919

Subfamily Nereidinae Blainville, 1818

- Alitta Kinberg, 1865
- Ceratonereis Kinberg, 1865
- Cheilonereis Benham, 1916
- Composetia Hartmann-Schröder, 1985
- Eunereis Malmgren, 1865
- Hediste Malmgren, 1867
- Imajimainereis de León-González & Solís-Weiss, 2000
- Laeonereis Hartman, 1945
- Leonnates Kinberg, 1865
- Micronereis Claparède, 1863
- Neanthes Kinberg, 1865
- Nectoneanthes Imajima, 1972
- Nereis Linnaeus, 1758
- Nicon Kinberg, 1865
- Paraleonnates Chlebovitsch & Wu, 1962
- Parasetia Villalobos-Guerrero, Conde-Vela & Sato, 2022
- Perinereis Kinberg, 1865
- Platynereis Kinberg, 1865
- Potamonereis Villalobos-Guerrero, Conde-Vela & Sato, 2022
- Pseudonereis Kinberg, 1865
- Simplisetia Hartmann-Schröder, 1985
- Solomononereis Gibbs, 1971
- Unanereis Day, 1962
- Wuinereis Khlebovich, 1996

Subfamily Nereididae incertae sedis:

- Kainonereis Chamberlin, 1919
- Lycastonereis Nageswara Rao, 1981

== Ecology ==
Ragworms are predominantly marine organisms that may occasionally swim upstream to rivers and even climb to land (for example Lycastopsis catarractarum). They are commonly found in all water depths, foraging in seaweeds, hiding under rocks, or burrowing in sand or mud. Ragworms are mainly omnivorous but many are active carnivores. Nereids breed only once before dying (semelparity), and most of them morph into a distinct form to breed (epitoky).

Ragworms are important food sources for a number of shore-birds.

== Human use ==
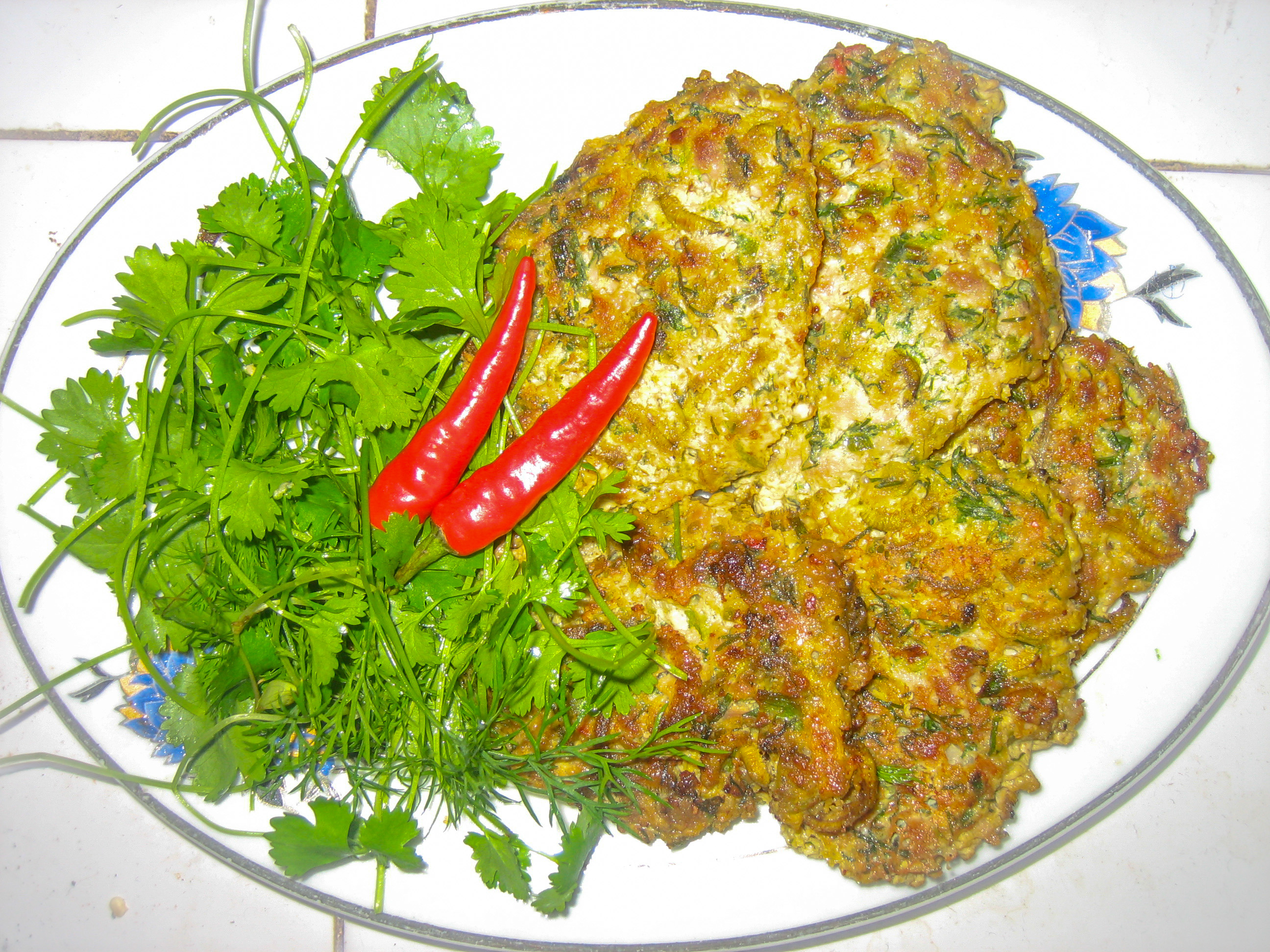
Chả rươi (an omelete made of Tylorrhynchus heterochetus) is considered a delicacy in Vietnam.

Ragworms such as Hediste diversicolor are commonly used as bait in sea-angling. They are a popular bait for all types of wrasse and pollock. They are also used as fish-feed in aquaculture.

Ragworms, such as Tylorrhynchus heterochetus, are considered a delicacy in Vietnam where they are used in the dish chả rươi.

In rice-growing areas of China, these worms are harvested from the rice-fields and are often cooked with eggs.

In Thailand, ragworms have occasionally been reported in tap water supply systems in Chachoengsao Province. They are often broadly grouped with other marine polychaetes, and are commonly associated with members of the family Syllidae found in Bangkok water systems, which are locally referred to as tua roi khā (Thai: ตัวร้อยขา,lit. 'hundred-legged creatuares') or tua Songkran (ตัวสงกรานต์, Songkran creatuares). They are frequently reported in tap water systems during the summer season, particularly around the Songkran festival period (13–15 April), which coincides with Thailand's hottest months.
