= Pectinereis =

Scientific classification
- Kingdom: Animalia
- Phylum: Annelida
- Clade: Pleistoannelida
- Subclass: Errantia
- Order: Phyllodocida
- Family: Nereididae
- Genus: Pectinereis
- Species: P. strickrotti

Binomial name
- Pectinereis strickrotti Villalobos-Guerrero et al.

Genus of nereid worm

Pectinereis is a genus of nereid worm that contains only the species Pectinereis strickrotti. The genus name is a combination of the Latin words pectinis (comb) and Nereis (the type genus of the family). The species is named for Bruce Strickrott, lead pilot of the deep-submergence vehicle Alvin. Molecular phylogenetic analysis suggests that Pectinereis strickrotti is most closely related to Alitta, Nectoneanthes, and Nereis.

== Description ==
Most nereidids perform oxygen exchange in branchiae; however, Pectinereis strickrotti possesses more elaborate gills. Furthermore, some nereidids use their respiratory organs for pheromone reception and as sexual adaptations, but this is not the case in P. strickrotti. When the worm is a sexually mature epitok, its body is divided into four regions, unlike the two regions of other nereidids. The rear chaetae undergo the fewest changes during epitoky, and may even be unmodified. The internal acicula are also unique; some of them in the rear parapodia are very stout, slightly curved, have a blunt end, and extend beyond the parapodial surface. These are called "hooked acicula," and are most near in appearance to those of Tambalagamia fauveli.

== Distribution, habitat, and ecology ==
The type locality of Pectinereis strickrotti off Costa Rica near a methane seep at a depth of around 1,000 meters

Specimens of the worm were first collected in 2018 by the deep-submergence vehicle Alvin off the research vessel Atlantis. They were found swimming near a methane seep off the Pacific coast of Costa Rica at a depth of around 1,000 meters. This habitat is unusual, as other related nereid worms are not found in the deep sea, but in shallow waters.

The diet and feeding habits of Pectinereis strickrotti are unknown.
