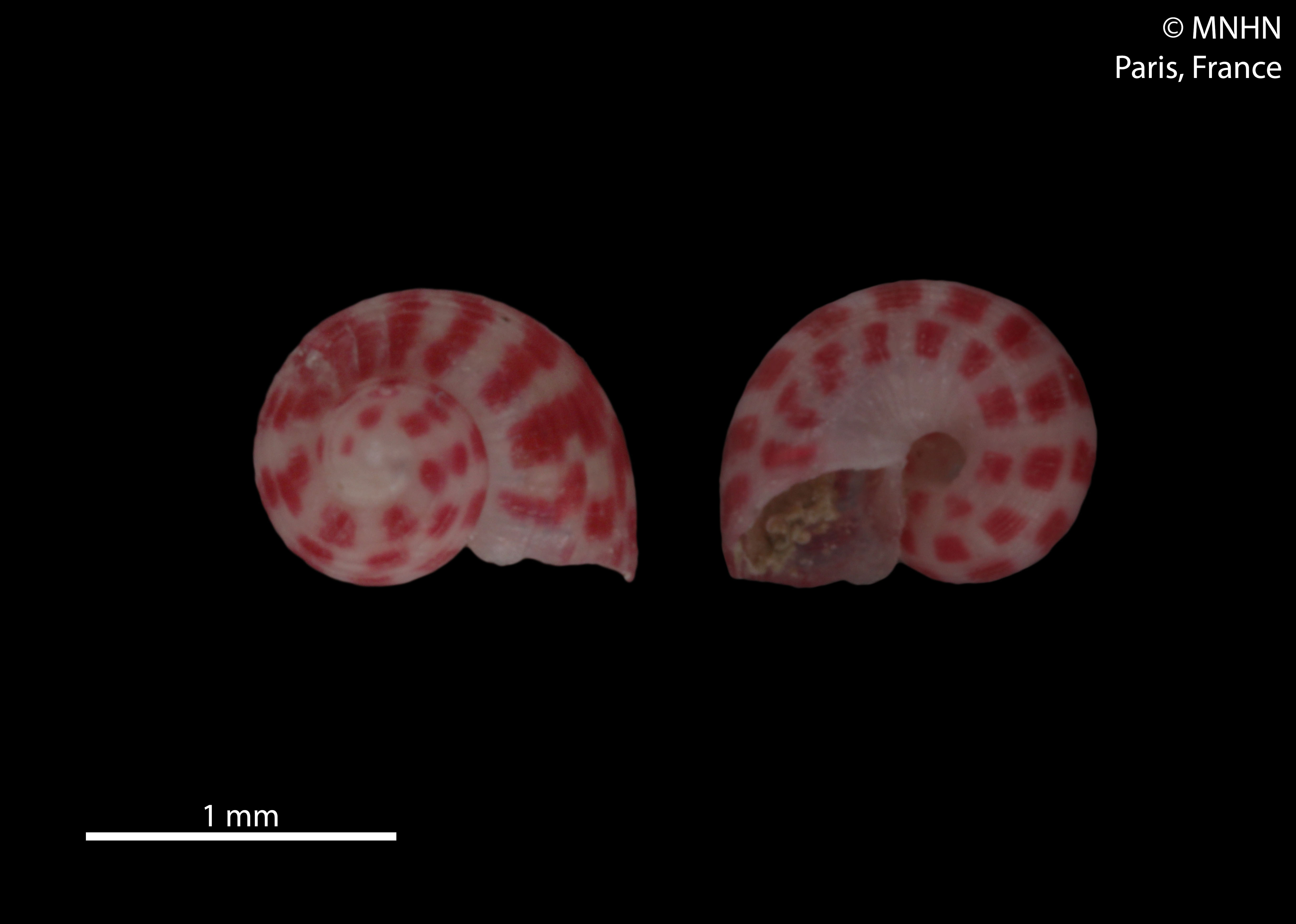
- Shell of Emiliotia rubrostriata (paratype at MNHN, Paris)

Scientific classification
- Kingdom: Animalia
- Phylum: Mollusca
- Class: Gastropoda
- Subclass: Vetigastropoda
- Order: Trochida
- Family: Colloniidae
- Genus: Emiliotia
- Species: E. rubrostriata

Binomial name
- Emiliotia rubrostriata (Rolán, Rubio, & Fernández-Garcés, 1997)

Synonyms
- Bothropoma rubrostriatum Rolán, Rubio & Fernández-Garcés, 1997, (original combination)

= Emiliotia rubrostriata =

Species of gastropod

Emiliotia rubrostriata is a species of sea snail, a marine gastropod mollusc in the family Colloniidae. It is also considered to be a member of the now defunct Prosobranchia. It is one of only four known species in its genus.

== Description ==
The height of the shell reaches only 1.4 mm. Faber referred to it as "one of the most beautiful microgastropods in the West Indies, certainly regarding its colour." The shell is thick and turbinate. It has a semi-transparent white color with pinkish-red dots that follow the outside of the spiral. Some dots may coalesce into streaks, but the spacing is generally even. The protoconch does not exhibit a full whorl, but has irregular spiral striae. The teleoconch has one final whorl and about 15 smooth, irregular spiral riblets. The spiral sculpture on the base quickly diminishes. It has a thick circular peristome, and the outer lip of the shell projects.

It may be confused with Liotia brasiliana which is a much larger species, or Arene riisei which is larger and has a more complex sculpture.

Emiliotia rubrostriata is considered a benthic macroinvertebrate, and could likely be a deposit feeder and/or grazer based on lineage.

== Distribution ==
This species occurs in the Gulf of Mexico and Caribbean Sea off of Florida and the Yucatán peninsula, with a local ecotype off Cuba and the Cayman islands. It has also been documented in the Atlantic along the Bahamas. It has been recorded up to 56 m below the surface, usually found on sandy bottoms or hard substrate. The species may be actively spreading through the northern Bahamas. Little is known about it, but one author said that it could possibly be a "recent introduction from another tropical region." This idea is highlighted by the fact that the particularly small snail has been collected close to major ship routes in the western Atlantic. See Dispersal of invasive species by ballast water.
