= Climate change and invasive species =

Increase of invasive organisms caused by climate change

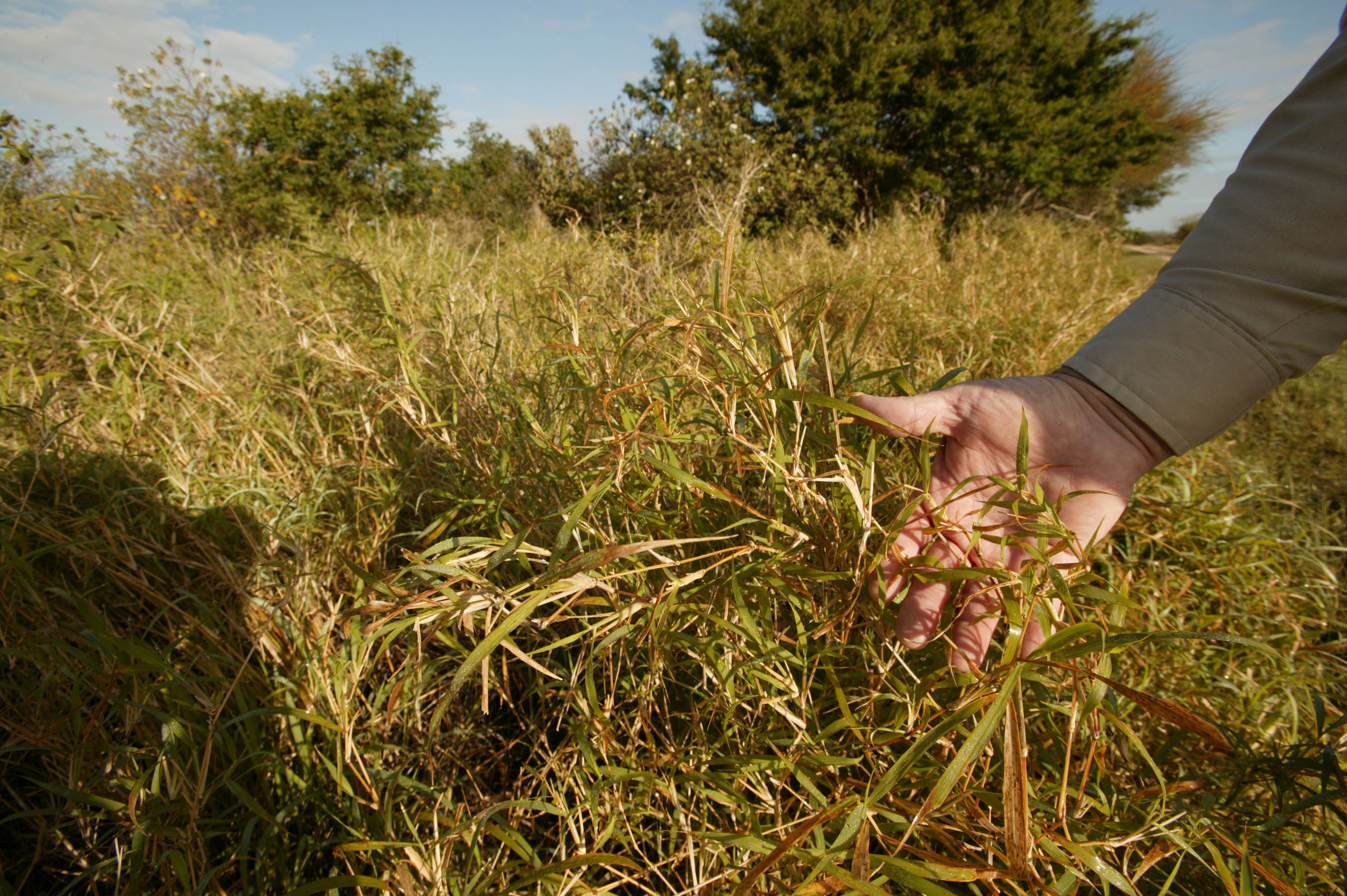
Buffelgrass (Cenchrus ciliaris) is an invasive species throughout the world that is pushing out native species.

Climate change and invasive species refer to the process of the environmental destabilization caused by climate change. These environmental changes facilitate the spread of invasive species — species that are not historically found in a certain region, and often have a negative impact to that region's native species. This relationship is notable because climate change and invasive species are also considered by the USDA to be two of the top four causes of global biodiversity loss.

The interaction between climate change and invasive species is complex and is difficult to assess. Climate change is likely to favour some invasive species and harm others, but few studies have identified specific consequences of climate change for invasive species. Consequences of climate change for invasive species are distinct from consequences for native species due to different characteristics (traits and qualities associated with invasions), management and abundance and can be direct, through the species survival, or indirect, through other factors such as pest or prey species.

Human-caused climate change and the rise in invasive species are directly linked to changing of ecosystems. The destabilization of climate factors in these ecosystems can lead to the creation of a more hospitable habitat for invasive species, thus allowing them to spread beyond their native ranges. Climate change broadens the invasion pathway that enables the spread of species. Not all invasive species benefit from climate change, but most observations show an acceleration of invasive populations. Examples of invasive species that have benefited from climate change include insects (such as the Western corn rootworm and other crop pests), pathogens (such as cinnamon fungus), freshwater and marine species (such as the brook trout), and plants (such as the umbrella tree).

Measurably warmer or colder conditions create opportunities for non-native terrestrial and marine organisms to migrate to new zones and compete with established native species in the same habitat. Due to their adaptability, non-native plants may invade and dominate newly suitable ecosystems.

So far, there have been more observations of climate change having a positive or accelerating effect on biological invasions than a negative one. However, most literature focuses on temperature only and due to the complex nature of both climate change and invasive species, outcomes are difficult to predict.

There are many ways to manage the impact of invasive species. Prevention, early detection, climate forecasting and genetic control are some ways communities can mitigate the risks of invasive species and climate change. Although the accuracy of models that study the complex patterns of species populations are difficult to assess, many predict range shifts for species as climates change.

== Definitions ==
=== Invasive species ===
According to the International Union for Conservation of Nature (2017), IUCN, invasive species are "animals, plants or other organisms that are introduced into places outside their natural range, negatively impacting native biodiversity, ecosystem services or human well-being."

Climate change will also redefine which species are considered as invasive species. Some taxa formerly considered as invasive may become less influential in an ecosystem changing with time, while other species formerly considered as non-invasive may become invasive. At the same time, a considerable amount of native species will undergo a range shift and migrate to new areas.

Shifting ranges, and changing impacts of invasive species, make the definition of the term "invasive species" difficult – it has become an example of a shifting baseline. Considering the changing dynamics mentioned above, Hellmann et al. (2008), concludes that invasive species should be defined as "those taxa that have been introduced recently" and exert a "substantial negative impact on native biota, economic values, or human health." Consequently, a native species gaining a larger range with a changing climate is not considered to be invasive, as long as it does not cause considerable damage.

The taxa that have been introduced by humans throughout history have changed from century to century and decade to decade, and so has the rate of introductions. Studies of global rates of first records of alien species (counted as the amount of first records of established alien species per time unit) show that during the period 1500–1800 the rates stayed at a low level, whereas the rates have been increasing constantly since the year 1800. 37% of all the first records of alien species have been registered as recently as during the period 1970–2014.

The invasion of alien species is one of the major drivers of biodiversity loss in general, and the second most common threat being related to complete species extinctions since the 16th century. Invasive alien species are also capable of reducing the resilience of natural habitats, and agricultural as well as urban areas, to climate change. Climate change, in turn, also reduces the resilience of habitats to species invasions.

Biological invasions and climate change are both two of the key processes affecting global diversity. Yet, their effects are often looked at separately, as multiple drivers interact in complex and non-additive ways. Some consequences of climate change have been widely acknowledged to accelerate the expansion of alien species, however, among which increasing temperatures is one.

=== Invasion pathway ===
The process of biological invasion occurs in a series of discrete steps, collectively known as the invasion pathway. It is commonly divided into four main stages: the introduction or transport stage, the colonization (or casual) stage, the establishment or naturalization stage, and the landscape spread or invasion stage. The invasion pathway describes the successive environmental filters that a species must overcome at each stage in order to become invasive. A variety of mechanisms influence the outcome of these steps, including climate change. In the initial transport stage, the filter is primarily geographic. In the second, colonization stage, the relevant filter consists of abiotic conditions. During the third, establishment stage, biotic interactions—such as competition, predation, and mutualisms—serve as the main filter. In the final landscape spread stage, landscape features and spatial heterogeneity determine which species successfully pass through this filter.

Due to climate change and melting arctic ice, the shipping industry will make start to be a significant play in the introduction and transport stage. Increasing temperatures are leading to formations of shorter travel routes, and in turn, easier ways for invasive species to spread. Organisms that hitch along the hulls of the ships are less likely to die in transit since the routes are shorter and their metabolism is slowed due to cold temperatures.

== Interactions ==
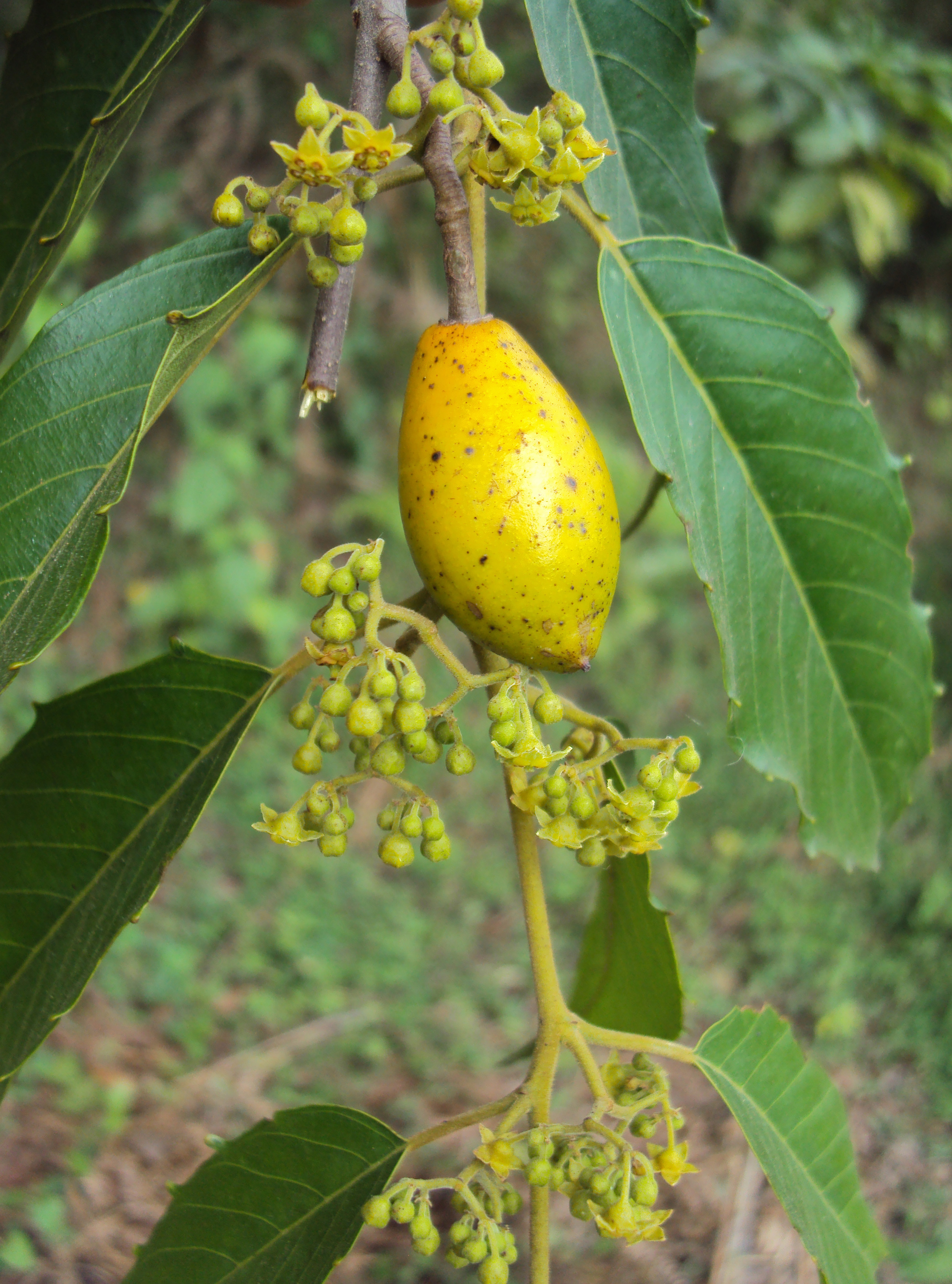
Tree species, Maesopsis eminii, invasive to Tanzania.

The interaction between climate change and invasive species is complex and not easy to assess. Climate change is likely to favour some invasive species and harm others, but few authors have identified specific consequences of climate change for invasive species.

As early as 1993, a climate/invasive species interaction was speculated for the alien tree species Maesopsis eminii that spread in the East Usambara mountain forests, Tanzania. Temperature changes, extremes of precipitation and decreased mist were cited as potential factors promoting its invasion.

Consequences of climate change for invasive species are distinct from consequences for native species due to different characteristics (traits and qualities associated with invasions), management and abundance and can be direct, through the species survival, or indirect, through other factors such as pest or prey species.

So far, there have been more observations of climate change having a positive or accelerating effect on biological invasions than a negative one. However, most literature focuses on temperature only and due to the complex nature of both climate change and invasive species, outcomes are difficult to predict.

=== Favorable conditions for the introduction of invasive species ===
==== Effects on invasion pathway stages ====
Climate change will interact with many existing stressors that affect the distribution, spread, abundance and impact of invasive species. Hence, in relevant literature, the impacts of climate change on invasive species are often considered separately per stage of the invasion pathway: (1) introduction/transport, (2) colonization/casual stage, (3) establishment/naturalization, (4) spread/invasion stage. According to those invasion stages there are 5 nonexclusive consequences of climate change for invasive species according to Hellmann:

1. Altered transport and introduction mechanisms
2. Altered climatic constraints on invasive species
3. Altered distribution of existing invasive species
4. Altered impact of existing invasive species
5. Altered effectiveness of management strategies

The first consequence of climate change, altered mechanisms for transport and introduction mechanisms, is given as invasions are often purposefully (e.g. biocontrol, sport fishing, agriculture) or accidentally introduced with the help of humans and climate change could alter the patterns of human transport. Changed recreational and commercial activities will change human transport and increase the propagule pressure of some non-native species from zero, e.g., connecting new regions or above a certain threshold that allows for establishment. Longer shipping seasons can increase the number of transports of non-native species and increase propagule pressure supporting potential invaders as the monkey goby. Additionally, introductions for recreation and conservation purposes could increase.

Changing climatic conditions can reduce native species' ability to compete with non-native species and some currently unsuccessful, non-native species will be able to colonize new areas if conditions change towards their original range. Multiple factors can increase the success of colonization, as described in more detail below in 2.2.

There is a wide range of climatic factors that affect the distribution of existing invasive species. Range limits due to cold or warm temperature constraints will change as a result of global warming, so that cold-temperature constrained species will be less restricted in their upper-elevation and higher-latitude range limits and warm-temperature constrained species will be less restricted in their lower-elevation and lower-latitude range limits. Changing precipitation patterns, the frequency of stream flow and changes in salinity can also affect hydrologic constraints of invasive species. As many invasive species have been selected for traits that facilitate long-distance dispersal it is likely that shifts in suitable climatic zones favour invasive species.

The impact on native species can be altered through population densities of invasive species. Competition interactions and abundance of native species or resources take part in the relative impact of invasive species.

The effectiveness of different management strategies is dependent on climate. For instance, mechanical control of invasive species by cold, hard freezes or ice cover can become less effective with increasing temperatures. Changes in the fate and behaviour of pesticides and their effectiveness in controlling invasive species can also occur. Decoupling of the relationship between some biocontrol agents and their targets can support invasions. On the other hand, the effectiveness of other biocontrol agents could increase due to species range overlaps.

==== Effects on climatic conditions ====
Another perspective to look at how climate change creates conditions that facilitate invasions is to consider the changes in the environment that have an impact on species survival. These changes in environmental conditions include temperature (terrestrial and marine), precipitation, chemistry (terrestrial and marine), ocean circulation and sea levels.

Most of the available literature on climate-induced biological invasions deals with warming effects, so that there is much more information for temperature effects on invasions than there is for precipitation patterns, extreme events and other climatic conditions.

Global warming can cause droughts in dryland, this later on can kill plants which require heavy water use from soil. It also can shift invasive species into this dryland that require water as well. Which in turn can further deplete water supply for plants of that region. All of these influences can lead to physiological stress of organism, thus increasing invasion and further destroying the native ecosystem.

===== Temperature =====
Several researchers found that climate change alters environmental conditions in a way that benefits species' distribution by enabling them to expand their ranges to areas where they were previously not able to survive or reproduce. Those range shifts are mainly attributed to an increased temperature caused by climate change. Shifts of geographic distributions will also challenge the definition of invasive species as mentioned earlier.

In aquatic ecosystems, cold temperatures and winter hypoxia are currently the limiting factors for the survival of invasive species and global warming will likely cause new species to become invasive.

In each stage of the invasion pathway temperature has potential impacts on the success of an invasive species. They are described in the section about effects of invasion pathway stages. They include facilitating colonization and successful reproduction of invasive species that have not been successful in the respective area before, changed competition interactions between native and invasive species, changed range limits regarding altitude and latitude and changed management effectiveness. Global warming can also modify human activity, like transport, in a way that increases the chances of biological invasions.

===== Extreme weather events =====
Climate change can cause increases in extreme weather like cold winters or storms, which can become problematic for the current invasive species. The invasive species that are adapted to a warmer climate or a more stable climate can get a disadvantage when sudden seasonal changes like an especially cold winter. Unpredictable extreme weather can therefore act as a reset mechanism for invasive species, reducing the amount of invasive species in the affected area. More extreme climatic events such as floods may also result in escapes of previously confined aquatic species and the removal of existing vegetation and creation of bare soil, which is then easier to colonize.

=== Invasive species benefiting from climate change ===
One important aspect of the success of invasive species under climate change is their advantage over native species. Invasive species often carry a set of traits that make them successful invaders (e.g., ability to survive in adverse conditions, broad environmental tolerances, rapid growth rates and wide dispersal), as those traits are selected for in the invasion process. Those traits will often help them succeed in competition with native species under climate change. However, invasive species do not exclusively, nor do all invasive species carry these traits. Rather there are some species that will benefit from climate change and others will be more negatively affected by it. For example, despite an invasive species ability to reach these new environments, their presence could lead to disruptions in the food chain of that ecosystem potentially causing large scale death to others and themselves. Invasive species are just more likely than native species to carry suitable traits that favour them in a changing environment as a result of selection processes along the invasion pathway.

Climate change can also drive longer-term change in community composition by altering the balance of competitive interactions between native and invasive species. The invasive species with broader ecological tolerances may gain a persistent advantage, which allows them to become more dominant in these communities. Over time, this can lead to a restructuring of species interactions, where native species may not only decline due to direct competition but also altered environmental conditions that favour the spread of invasive species.

Some native species that are dependent on mutualistic relationships will see a reduction in their fitness and competitive ability as a result of climate change effects on the other species in the mutualistic relationship. As non-native species are depending more rarely on mutualistic relationships they will be less affected by this mechanism.

Climate change also challenges the adaptability of native species through changes in the environmental conditions, making it difficult for native species to survive and easy for invasive species to take over empty niches. Changes in the environment can also compromise the native species' ability to compete with invaders, that are often generalists. Invasive species do not require climate change to damage ecosystems; however, climate change might exacerbate the damage they do cause.

==== Decoupling of ecosystems ====
Food webs and chains are two varying ways to examine energy transfer and predation through a community. While food webs tend to be more realistic and easy to identify in environments, food chains highlight the importance of energy transfer between trophic levels. Air temperature greatly influences not only germination of vegetative species but also the foraging and reproductive habits of animal species. In either way of approaching relationships between populations, it is important to realize that species likely cannot and will not adjust to climate change in the same way or at the same rate. This phenomenon is known as 'decoupling' and has detrimental effects on the successful functioning of affected environments. In the Arctic, caribou calves are beginning to largely miss out on food as vegetation begins growing earlier in the season as a result of rising temperatures.

Specific examples of decoupling within an environment include the time lag between air warming and soil warming and the relationship between temperature (as well as photoperiod) and heterotrophic organisms. The former example results from the ability of soil to hold its temperature. Similar to how water has a higher specific heat than air, which results in ocean temperatures being warmest at the close of the summer season, soil temperature lags behind that of air. This results in a decoupling of above and below ground subsystems.

This affects invasion because it increases growth rates and distribution of invasive species. Invasive species typically have better tolerance to different environmental conditions increasing their survival rate when climate changes. This later translates to when species die because they can not live in that ecosystem any more. The new organisms that move in can take over that ecosystem.

=== Other effects ===
The current climate in many areas will change drastically, this can both effect current native species and invasive species. Current invasive coldwater species that are adapted to the current climate may be unable to persist under new climate conditions. This shows that the interaction between climate change and invasive species does not need to be in favour for the invader.

If a specific habitat changes drastically due to climate change, can the native species become an invader in its native habitat. Such changes in the habitat can inhibit the native species from completing its life cycle or forcing range shift. Another result from the changed habitat is local extinction of the native species when its unable to migrate.

==== Migration ====
Higher temperatures also mean longer growing seasons for plants and animals, which allows them to shift they ranges toward North. Poleward migration also changes the migration patterns of many species. Longer growing seasons mean the time of arrival for species changes, which changes the amount of food supply available at the time of arrival altering the species reproductive success and survival. There is also secondary effects global warming has on species such as changes in habitat, food source, and predators of that ecosystem. Which later could lead to the local extinction of species or migration to a new area suitable for that species.

== Examples ==
=== Insect pests ===
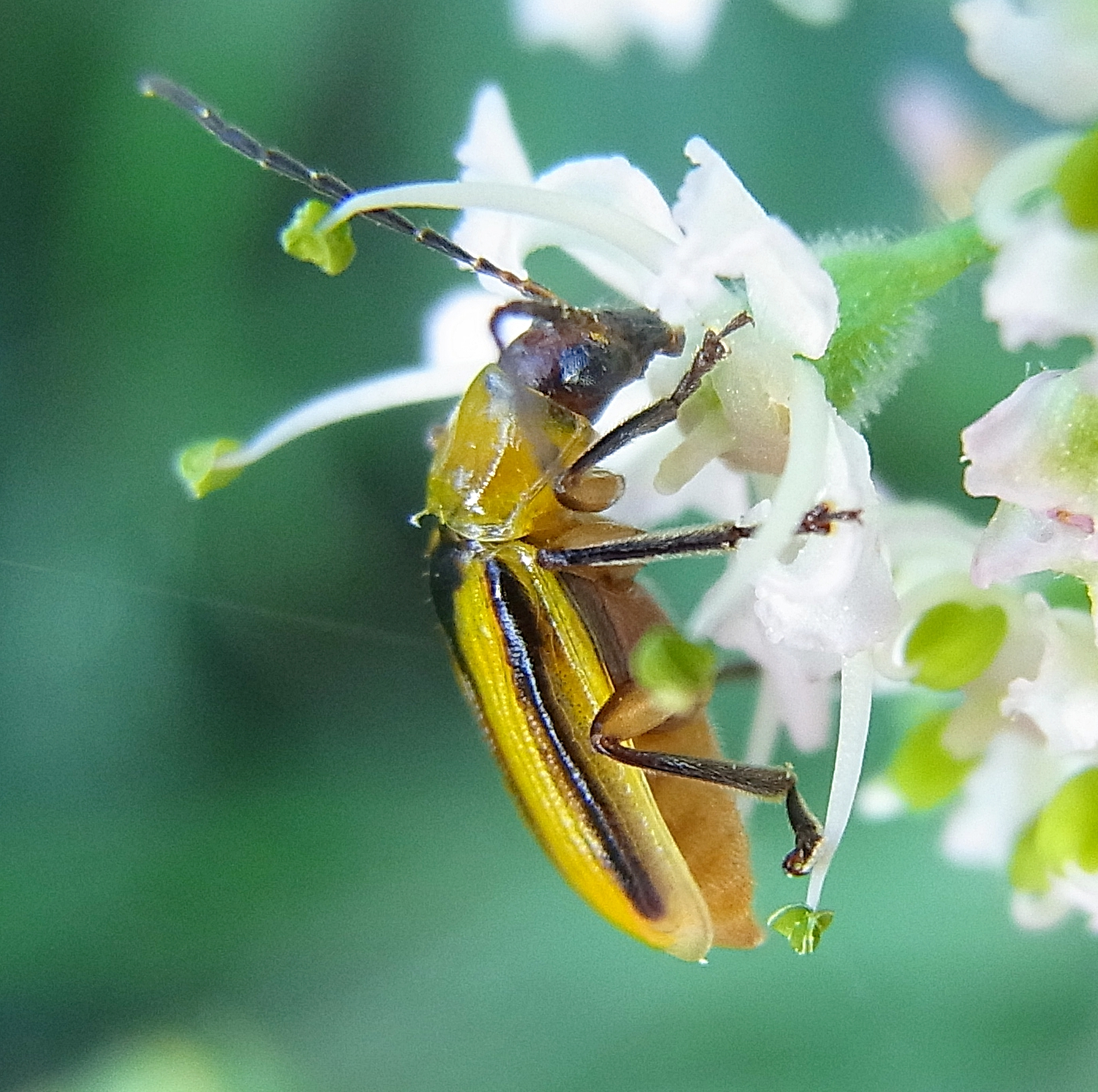
Diabrotica virgifera, crop pest invasive to Europe.

Insect pests have always been viewed as a nuisance, most often for their damaging effects on agriculture, parasitism of livestock, and impacts on human health. Influenced heavily by climate change and invasions, they have recently been looked at as a significant threat to both biodiversity and ecosystem functionality. Forestry industries are also at risk for being affected. There are a plethora of factors that contribute to existing concerns regarding the spread of insect pests: all of which stem from increasing air temperatures. Phenological changes, overwintering, increase in atmospheric carbon dioxide concentration, migration, and increasing rates of population growth all impact pests' presence, spread, and impact both directly and indirectly. Diabrotica virgifera virgifera, western corn rootworm, migrated from North America to Europe. In both continents, western corn rootworm has had significant impacts on corn production and therefore economic costs. Phenological changes and warming of air temperature have allowed this pests' upper boundary to expand further northward. In a similar sense of decoupling, the upper and lower limits of a species' spread is not always paired neatly with one another. Mahalanobis distance and multidimensional envelope analysis performed by Pedro Aragon and Jorge M. Lobo predict that even as the pests' range expands northward, currently invaded European communities will remain within the pests' favored range.

In general, it is expected that global distribution of crop pests will increase as an effect of climate change. This is expected for all kinds of crops creating a threat for both agriculture and other commercial use of crops.

When the climate gets warmer is the crop pest predicted to spread towards the poles in latitude and in altitude. Dry or cold areas with a current mean temperature around 7.5 °C (45.5 °F) and a current precipitation below 1100 mm/year could potentially be more affected than other areas. The present climate in these areas are often unfavourable for the crop pest that currently lives there, therefore will an increase in the temperature bring advantages to the pests. With increased temperatures will the life-cycle for the crop pests be faster and with winters above freezing temperatures will new crop pests species be able to inhabit these areas. Precipitation has a lesser effect on crop pests than temperatures but it can still impact the crop pests. Drought and dry plants make host plants more attractive for insects and therefore increase the crop pests during droughts. For example, the confused flour beetle is predicted to increase in the South American austral region with an increased temperature. A higher temperature decreased the mortality and development time for the confused flour beetle. The confused flour beetle population is expected to increase the most in higher latitudes

Areas with a warmer climate or lower altitudes are predicted to experience and decrease in crop pests. The largest decline in crop pests is expected to occur in areas with a mean temperature of 27 °C (81 °F) or a precipitation above 1100 mm/year. Despite the decline in crop pests it is unlikely that climate change will result in the complete removal of the existing crop pest species in the area. With a higher amount of precipitation can flush away eggs and larvae that is a potential crop pest

=== Pathogen impacts ===
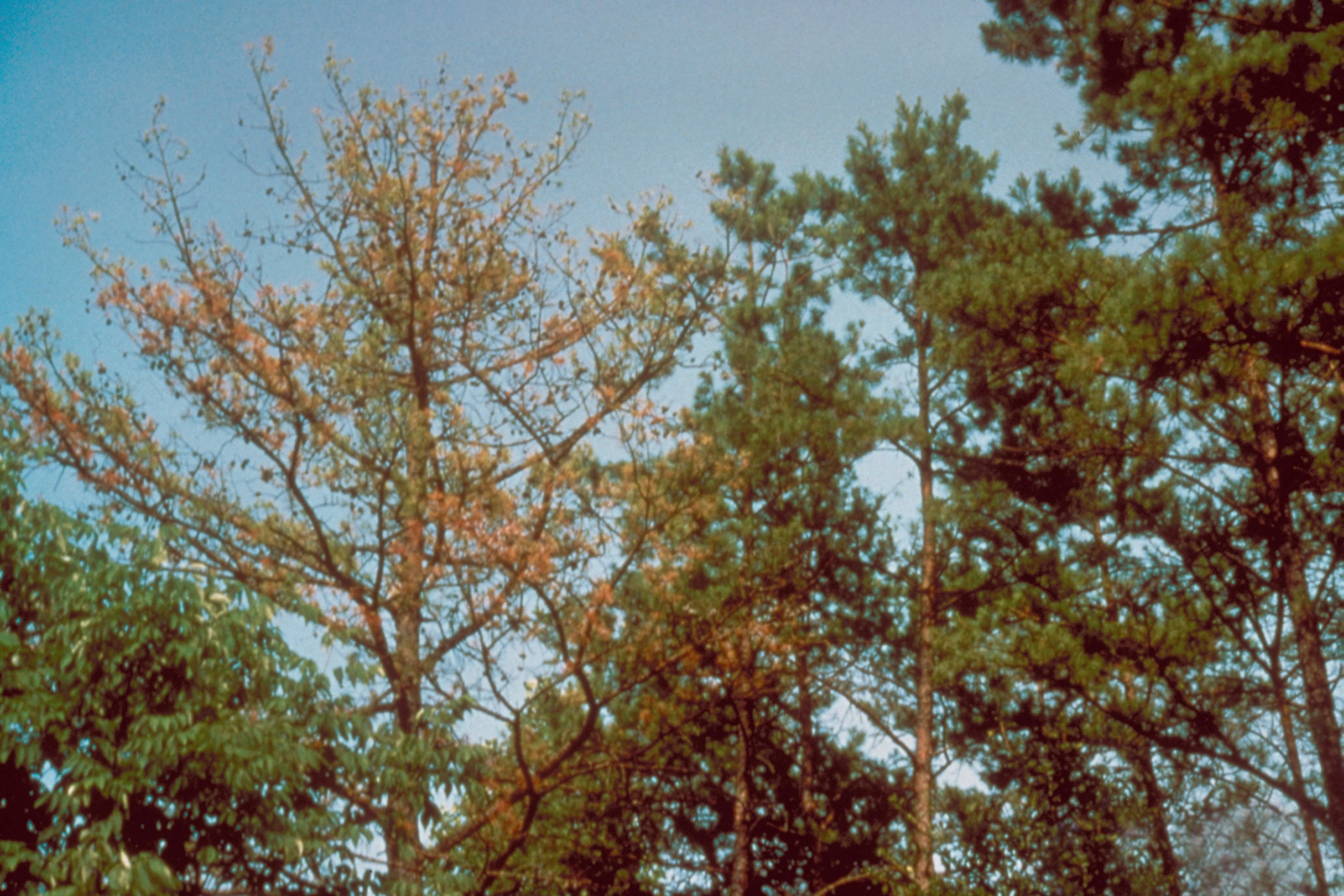
Trees impacted by cinnamon fungus.

While still limited in research scope, it is known that climate change and invasive species impact the presence of pathogens and there is evidence that global warming will increase the abundance of plant pathogens specifically. While certain weather changes will affect species differently, increased air moisture plays a significant role in the rapid outbreaks of pathogens. In the little amount of research that has been completed regarding the incidence of plant pathogens in response to climate change, the majority of the completed work focuses on above-ground pathogens. This does not mean that soil-borne pathogens are exempt from experiencing the effects of climate change. Phytophthora cinnamomi, a pathogen that causes oak tree decline, is a soil-borne pathogen that increased in activity in response to climate change.

=== Marine environments ===
Barriers between marine ecosystems are typically physiological in nature as opposed to geographic (e.g., mountain ranges). These physiological barriers may be seen as changes in pH, water temperature, water turbidity, or more. Climate change and global warming have begun to affect these barriers – the most significant of which being water temperature. The warming of sea water has allowed crabs to invade Antarctica, and other durophagous predators are not far behind. As these invaders move in, species endemic to the benthic zone will have to adjust and begin to compete for resources, destroying the existing ecosystem.

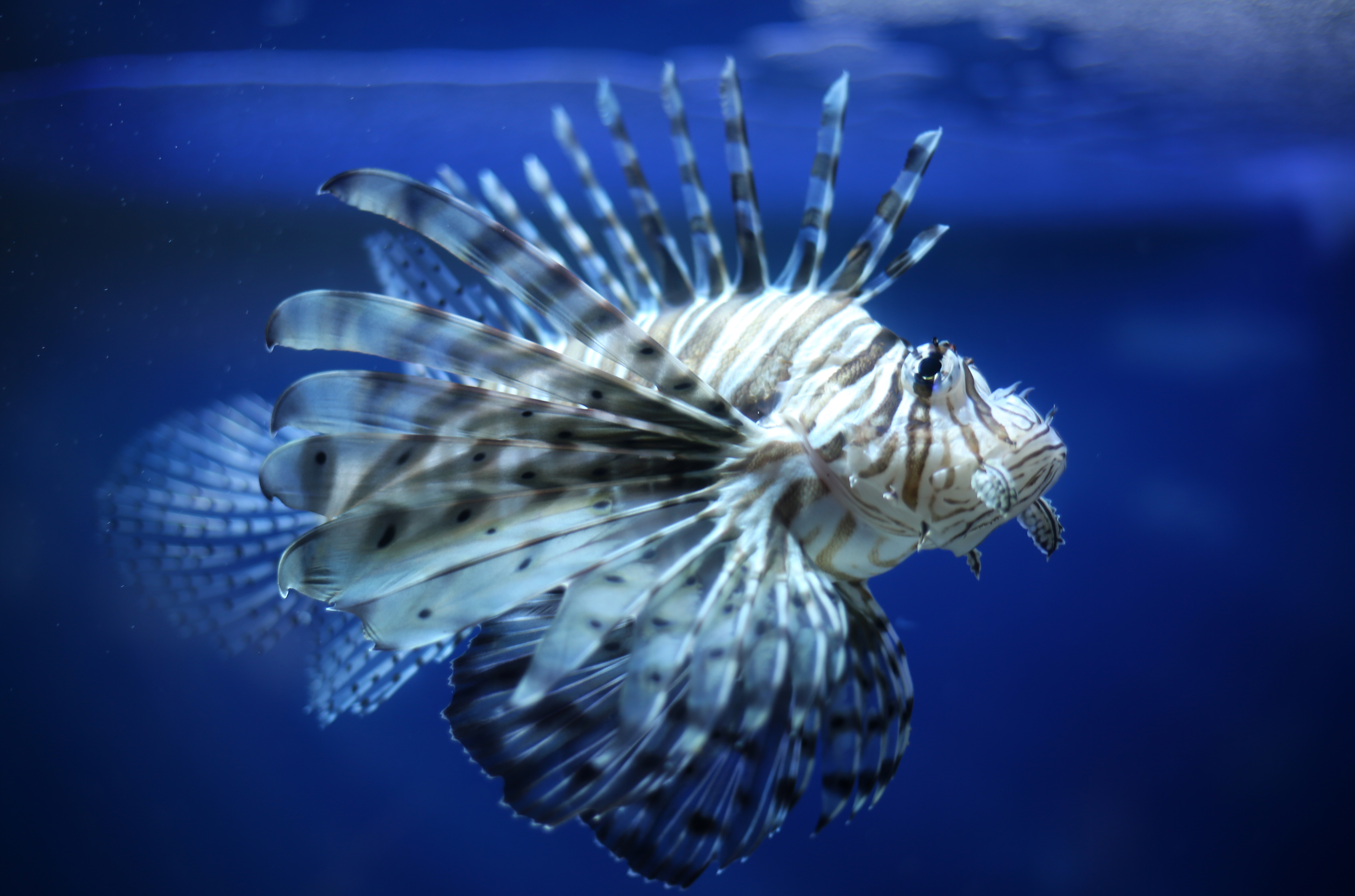
Pterois Miles (Lionfish).

In the Mediterranean Sea, Pterois miles, more commonly known as Lionfish, have begun to infiltrate and take over its environments. Their high success rates as predators in their native habitats have proven to have transferred into their new ranges as well. This significant impact on prey is largely contributed to the ‘naïve prey hypothesis’ which aims to explain that prey who have not interacted with a specific predator before are unaware how to effectively protect themselves due to a lack of evolutionary instinct on how to deal with them. Lionfish, as generalist predators, have the potential to severely disrupt Mediterranean ecosystems. Specifically, they target smaller fish and have caused a 79-80% decrease in the recruitment of prey fish in other areas. Although it is a newer invasion, this has the potential to severely decrease prey populations leading to a fully disrupted food chain and changed species interaction.

=== Freshwater environments ===
Freshwater systems are significantly affected by climate change. Extinction rates within freshwater bodies of water tend to be equitable or even higher than some terrestrial organisms. While species may experience range-shifts in response to physiologic changes, outcomes are species-specific and not reliable in all organisms. As water temperatures increase, it is organisms that inhibit warmer waters that are positively affected, while cold-water organisms are negatively affected. Warmer temperature also leads to the melting of arctic ice, which increases the sea level. Because of the rise in sea water, most photosynthesizing species are not able to get the right amount of light to sustain living.

Compared to terrestrial environments, freshwater ecosystems have very few geographical and allosteric barriers between different areas. The increased temperature and shorter duration of cold temperature will increase the probability of invasive species in the ecosystem, because the winter hypoxia that prevents the species' survival will be eliminated. This is the case with the brook trout that is an invasive species in lakes and streams in Canada.

The invasive brook trout has the capacity to eliminate the native bull trout and other native species in Canadian streams. The temperature of the water plays a big part in the brook trout's capacity to inhabit a stream, but other factors like the stream flow and geology are also important factors in how well established the brook trout is. The bull trout has a positive population growth or holds a competitive advantage only in streams that do not exceed 4–7 °C (39–45 °F) in the warmest months. The brook trout has a competitive and a physiological advantage over bull trout in warmer water, e.g., 15–16 °C (59–61 °F). The winter period is also an important factor for the brook trout's capacity to inhabit a stream. Brook trout may have a reduced survival rate if it is exposed to especially long and harsh winter periods. Due to the observations that the range of brook trout is dependent on the temperature, there is an increasing concern that the brook trout will eliminate the bull trout even further in colder water due to increasing temperature because of climate change. Climate change influences not only the temperature in lakes but also stream flows and therefore other factors in streams. This unknown factor makes it hard to predict how the brook trout and bull trout will react to climate change.

== Management and prevention ==
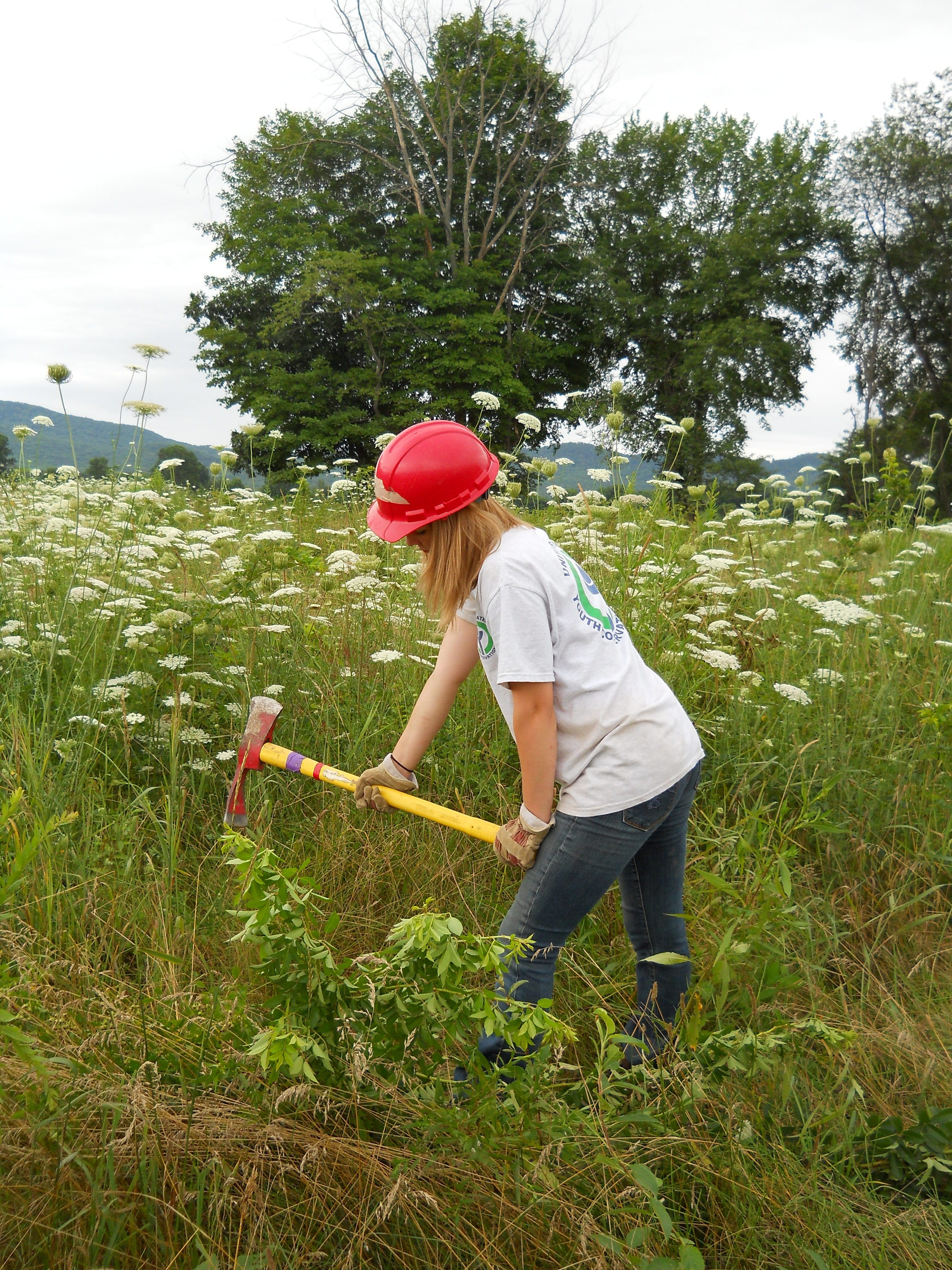
Mechanical/manual control of invasive species

Management strategies generally have a different approach regarding invasive species compared to most native species. In terms of climate change and native species, the most fundamental strategy is conservation. The strategy for invasive species is, however, majorly about control management. There are several different types of management and prevention strategies, such as following.

=== Approaches ===
1. Prevention: This is generally the more environmentally desirable approach, but is difficult to practice due to the issues with separating invasive from non-invasive species. Border control and quarantine measures are normally the first prevention mechanisms. Preventative measures include exchanging ballast water in the middle of the ocean, which is the main tool accessible for ships to limit the introduction of invasive species. Another method of prevention is public education to increase the understanding of individual actions on furthering the spread of invasive species and promote awareness about strategies to reduce the introduction and spread of invasive species. Invasion risk assessment can also aid in preventative management since it allows for early identification. Invasion risk is done by the identification of a potentially invasive species through comparison of common traits.
2. Monitoring and early detection: Samples can be taken in specific areas to see if any new species are present. These samples are then run through a database in order to see if the species are invasive. This can be done using genetic tools such as environmental DNA (eDNA). These eDNA-samples, taken in ecosystems, are then run through a database that contains bioinformatics of species DNA. When the database matches a sequence from the sample's DNA, information about species that are or have been present in the studied area can be obtained. If the species are confirmed to be invasive, the managers can then take precautions in the form of a rapid response eradication method. The eDNA method is majorly used in marine environments, but there are ongoing studies about how to use it in terrestrial environments as well.
3. Rapid response: Several methods of eradication are used to prevent distribution and irreversible introduction of invasive species into new areas and habitats. There are several types of rapid response:
  - Mechanical/manual control: This is often done through human labor, such as hand pulling, mowing, cutting, mulching, flooding, digging and burning of invasive species. Burning often takes place mid-spring, to prevent further damage to the area's ecosystem and harm to the managers who administer the fires. Manual control methods can kill or reduce the populations of non-native species. Mechanical controls are sometimes effective and generally do not engender public criticism. Instead, they can often bring awareness and public interest and support for controlling invasive species.
  - Chemical control: Chemicals such as pesticides (e.g. DDT) and herbicides can be used to eradicate invasive species. Though it might be effective to eliminate target species, it often creates health hazards for both non-target species and humans. It is therefore generally a problematic method when, for example, rare species are present in the area.
  - Biological control: This is a method where organisms are used to control invasive species. One common strategy is to introduce natural enemy species of invasive species in an area, with the aim to establish the enemy which will drive the invasive species' population to a contracted range. One major complication with the biological method is that introduction of enemy species, which itself in a sense is an invasion as well, sometimes can affect non-target species negatively as well. There has been criticism regarding this method, for example when species in conservation areas have been affected or even driven to extinction by biocontrol species.
4. Restoration of ecosystems: Restoration of ecosystems after eradication of invasive species can build resilience against future introductions. To some degree, ecological niche models predict contraction of some species' ranges. If the models are somewhat accurate, this creates opportunities for managers to alter the composition of native species to build resilience against future invasions.
5. Forecasting: Climate models can somewhat be used to project future range shifts of invasive species. Since the future climate itself cannot be determined, though, these models are often very limited. However, the models can still be used as indicators of general range shifts by managers to plan management strategies.
6. Genetic control: New technology has presented a potential solution for invasive species management: genetic control. A form of genetic pest management has been developed that targets the mating behavior of pests to introduce harm-reducing genetically engineered DNA into wild populations. Though not widely implemented yet for invasive species specifically, there is an expanding interest in using genetic pest management for invasive species control. The induction of triploidy also exists to manage invasive species through the production of sterile males to biologically control pests. Similar to the use of triploidy, another form of genetic control is the Trojan Y technique which serves as a sex-marker identification and aims to bias the sex ratio of populations, typically fish, towards males in order to drive the population to extinction. Trojan Y specifically uses sex-reversed females containing two Y chromosomes, known as "Trojan Y", to reduce the success of breeding in the population. A counterpart to the Trojan Y technique, the Trojan Female technique aims to release "Trojan females" carrying mitochondrial DNA mutations that lead to a reduction in female, rather than male, fertility. Gene drive is also another technique to suppress pest populations.

== Predictions ==
The geographical range of invasive alien species threaten to alter due to climate change, such as the brook trout (Salvelinus fontinalis). To forecast future impact of climate change on distribution of invasive species, there is ongoing research in modelling. These bioclimatic models, also known as ecological niche models or climate envelope models, are developed with the aim to predict changes in species ranges and are an essential tool for the development of effective management strategies and actions (e.g. eradication of invasive species and prevention of introduction) to reduce the future impact of invasive species on ecosystems and biodiversity. The models generally simulate current distributions of species together with predicted changes in climate to forecast future range shifts.

Many species ranges are predicted to expand. Yet, studies also predict contractions of many species future range, especially regarding vertebrates and plants at a large spatial scale. One reason for range contractions could possibly be that species ranges due to climate change generally move poleward and that they therefore at some point will reach the sea which acts as a barrier for further spread. This is, however, the case when some phases of the invasion pathway, e.g. transport and introduction, are not considered in the models. Studies majorly investigate predicted range shifts in terms of the actual spread and establishment phases of the invasive pathway, excluding the phases of transportation and introduction. Models have also investigated the impact of invasive species on local climate change—for example, accelerating the increase of wetlands as a result of the loss of forest canopy.

These models are useful for making predictions but are yet very limited. Range shifts of invasive species are very complex and difficult to make predictions about, due to the multiple variables affecting the invasion pathway. This causes complications with simulating future predictions. Climate change, which is the most fundamental parameter in these models, cannot be determined since the future level of the greenhouse emissions are uncertain. Additionally, climate variables that are directly linked to greenhouse emissions, such as alterations in temperature and precipitations, are likewise difficult to predict with certainty. How species range shifts will react to changes in climate, e.g. temperature and precipitation, is therefore largely unknown and very complex to understand and predict. Other factors that can limit range shifts, but models often do not consider, are for example presence of the right habitat for the invader species and if there are resources available.

The level of accuracy is thus unknown for these models, but they can to some extent be used as indicators that highlight and identify future hotspots for invasions at a larger scale. These hotspots could for example be summarized into risk maps that highlight areas with high suitability for invaders. This would be a beneficial tool for management development and help to construct prevention strategies and to control spreading.
