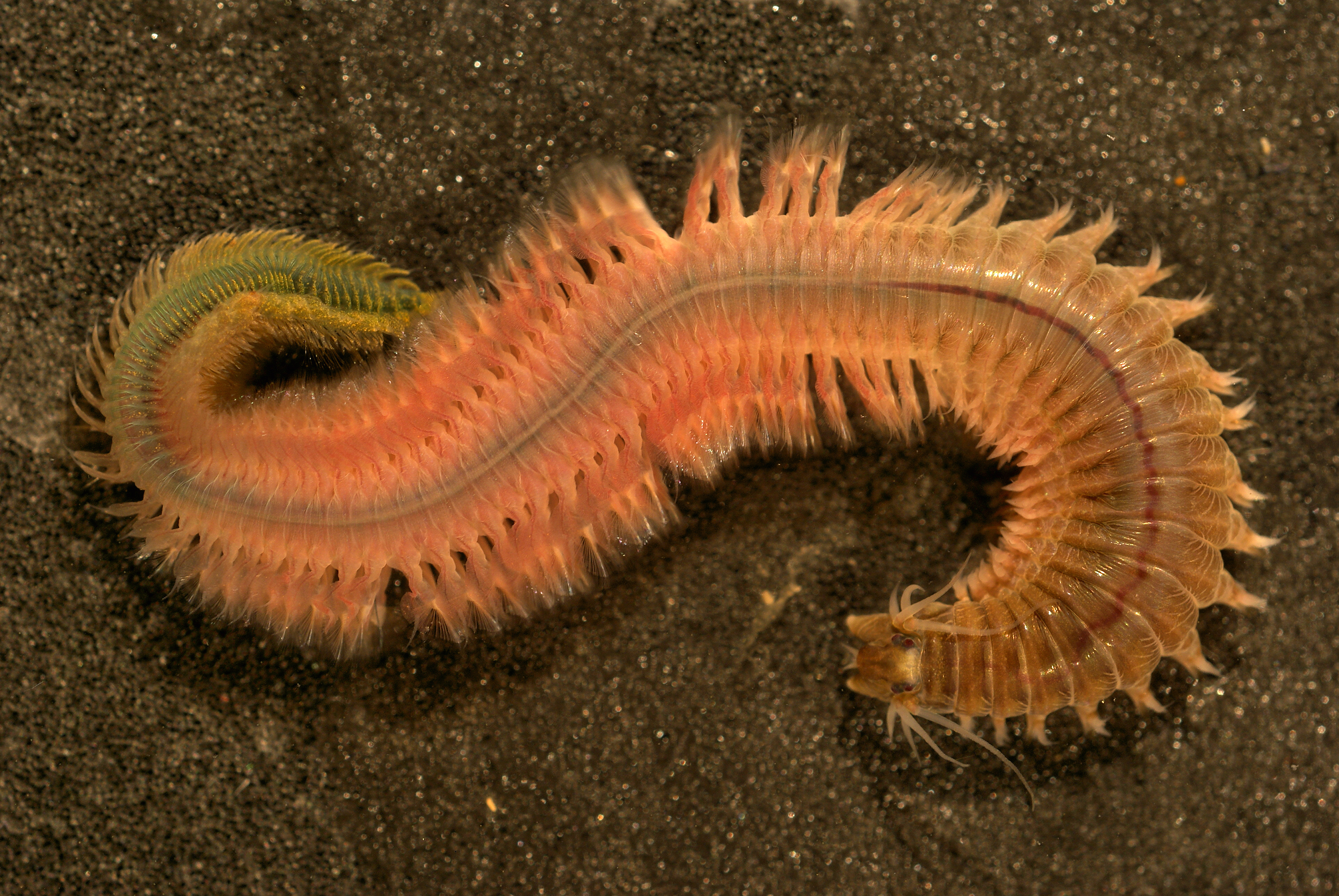

Conservation status
- Not evaluated (IUCN 3.1)

Scientific classification
- Kingdom: Animalia
- Phylum: Annelida
- Clade: Pleistoannelida
- Subclass: Errantia
- Order: Phyllodocida
- Family: Nereididae
- Genus: Alitta
- Species: A. succinea

Binomial name
- Alitta succinea (Frey & Leuckart, 1847)

Synonyms
- List: Nereis succinea Frey & Leuckart, 1847; Nereis (Neanthes) succinea (Frey & Leuckart, 1847); Neanthes succinea (Frey & Leuckart, 1847); Nereis limbata Ehlers, 1868; Nereis (Neanthes) perrieri Saint-Joseph, 1898; Nereis acutifolia Ehlers, 1901; Nereis glandulosa Ehlers, 1908; Nereis reibischi Heinen, 1911; Nereis (Neanthes) australis Treadwell, 1923; Nereis belawanensis Pflugfelder, 1933; Nereis (Neanthes) saltoni Hartman, 1936; Neanthes saltoni (Hartman, 1936)

= Alitta succinea =

Common clam worm

Alitta succinea (known as the pile worm, clam worm or cinder worm) is a species of marine annelid in the family Nereididae (commonly known as ragworms or sandworms). It has been recorded throughout the North West Atlantic, as well as in the Gulf of Maine and South Africa.

== Description ==
Alitta succinea in motion

Alitta succinea has a long, elongated, cylindrical body divided into 160 segments, with four eyes, and two antennae on the front, resembling a pear shape with the posterior of its body being longer. The clam worm can reach up to 15 centimetres (6 in) in length, but most specimens are smaller than this. It is brown colored at the rear, and reddish-brown on the rest of its body. It has an identifiable head with four eyes, two sensory feelers or palps, and many tentacles. The head consists of two segments: the anterior and posterior prostomium. The last body segment is known as the pygidium. The jaws of the clam worm are partly composed of zinc, making them lightweight compared to calcified jaws, whilst still maintaining strength.

== Ecology and behavior ==
To feed, it uses a proboscis, which has two hooks at the end, to grasp prey and draw it into its mouth. Clam worms are an important food source for bottom-feeding fish and crustaceans, though they also feed on different species of aquatic plants such as algae and diatoms. By feeding on organic matter and types of waste and debris that is in the surrounding water the worm is commonly classified as a deposit feeder, more specifically omnivorous. They are also commonly preyed upon and an important food source for many animals. Crab, fish, and shorebirds are the most common predators of the clam worm. Populations in the Caspian Sea are heavily influenced by the predation of fish. The species was brought over to the Caspian Sea to increase the fish populations for the use of commercial fishing.

Alitta succinea have been recorded to be indicators of imbalances in their habitats. Populations in the Black Sea have been shown to indicate changes in the water chemistry. Die-offs of the species can occur when there are hostile environmental changes in the habitats they live in. Shore bird populations commonly decline when populations of the clam worm dissipate.

=== Life cycle ===
Alitta succinea is a freeswimming polychaete, scavenging on the bottom of shallow marine waters. It feeds on other worms and algae. They can protect themselves by secreting a mucous substance that hardens to form a sheath around them.

During lunar phases in the spring and early summer, the clam worm undergoes epigamy: Their parapodia enlarge so they can swim, and their body cavities fill with the sex-appropriate gametes; the clam worms are then capable of releasing eggs and sperm, soon after which they die. Planktonic larvae develop from the fertilization of the released eggs with corresponding sperm, grow into adults, and eventually sink to the bottom of the water.

=== Reproduction ===
Like most of its fellow polychaetes, Alitta succinea reproduces sexually. Fertilization normally occurs externally, and the sexes are separate. Epitoky is a process that occurs in polychaete, where a sexually immature worm (apitoke) is transformed into a sexual mature worm (epitoke). There are two methods of epitoky: schizogamy and epigamy.

- Schizogamy where atoke is formed from division of the organism into sexual and asexual parts. Asexual reproduction to produce buds from its posterior end. Each bud into an epitoke and once fully formed, will then break off from atoke and become free swimming.
- Epigamy is the other method of morphological modifications. Typically, female and male worms undergo a metamorphosis to epitoke where they become even better swimmers and carry gametes.

When sexual maturity is achieved, individuals who metamorphose into a nektonic (free swimming) heternoneid form (free swimming di-morphic sexual individual). It is similar to the non-reproductive form of the worm, however, the parapodia are more apparent (larger) and can be lobal. Modifications of the heternoneid form may include an enhanced swimming ability (parapodia enlargement), body cavity filled with gametes, large eyes, and incomplete gut formation. Females produce a pheromone attracting and signaling males to shed sperm, which in turn stimulates the females to shed eggs; this feature is known as swarming. Both sexes swim to the surface to release gametes, and swarming increases chances of fertilization. Environmental factors can also trigger swarming, such as temperature, salinity, light levels, and the lunar cycle. Reproduction normally occurs around early spring, and may extend into the summer. Both sexes die after swarming and after fertilization most eggs become planktonic, although some are retained in the worm tubes or burrow in jelly masses attached to the tubes (egg brooders). Eggs develop into trochophore larvae, which later metamorphose into juveniles, which in turn develop into adults.

== Economic importance ==
Alitta succinea was first introduced to bodies of water to enhance the salinity and bring in new hybrids of fish that could be sold for a larger quota. In the present day, Alitta succinea is used in different wildlife situations to determine the pollutants present, their levels, and how they affect the wildlife in that area. Additionally, Alitta succinea is used as bait for fishing, resulting in increased fish, crab, and oyster harvesting in newly restored reefs on the mainland.

== Dispersal ==
A. succinea is dispersed outside of its native range in the course of oyster farming and fishing, on the oysters themselves, in ballast water, as hull fouling, on normal ocean currents, and possibly in sport fishing bait.
