= Emiliotia immaculata =

Scientific classification
- Kingdom: Animalia
- Phylum: Mollusca
- Class: Gastropoda
- Subclass: Vetigastropoda
- Order: Trochida
- Superfamily: Trochoidea
- Family: Colloniidae
- Subfamily: Colloniinae
- Genus: Emiliotia
- Species: E. immaculata

Binomial name
- Emiliotia immaculata Ortea, Espinosa & Fernández-Garcés, 2008

Species of gastropod

Emiliotia immaculata is a species of small sea snail with calcareous opercula, a marine gastropod mollusk in the family Colloniidae.

== Distribution ==
This species occurs in the Caribbean Sea off Cuba.
