= Osorno Steer =

Type of meat from Chile

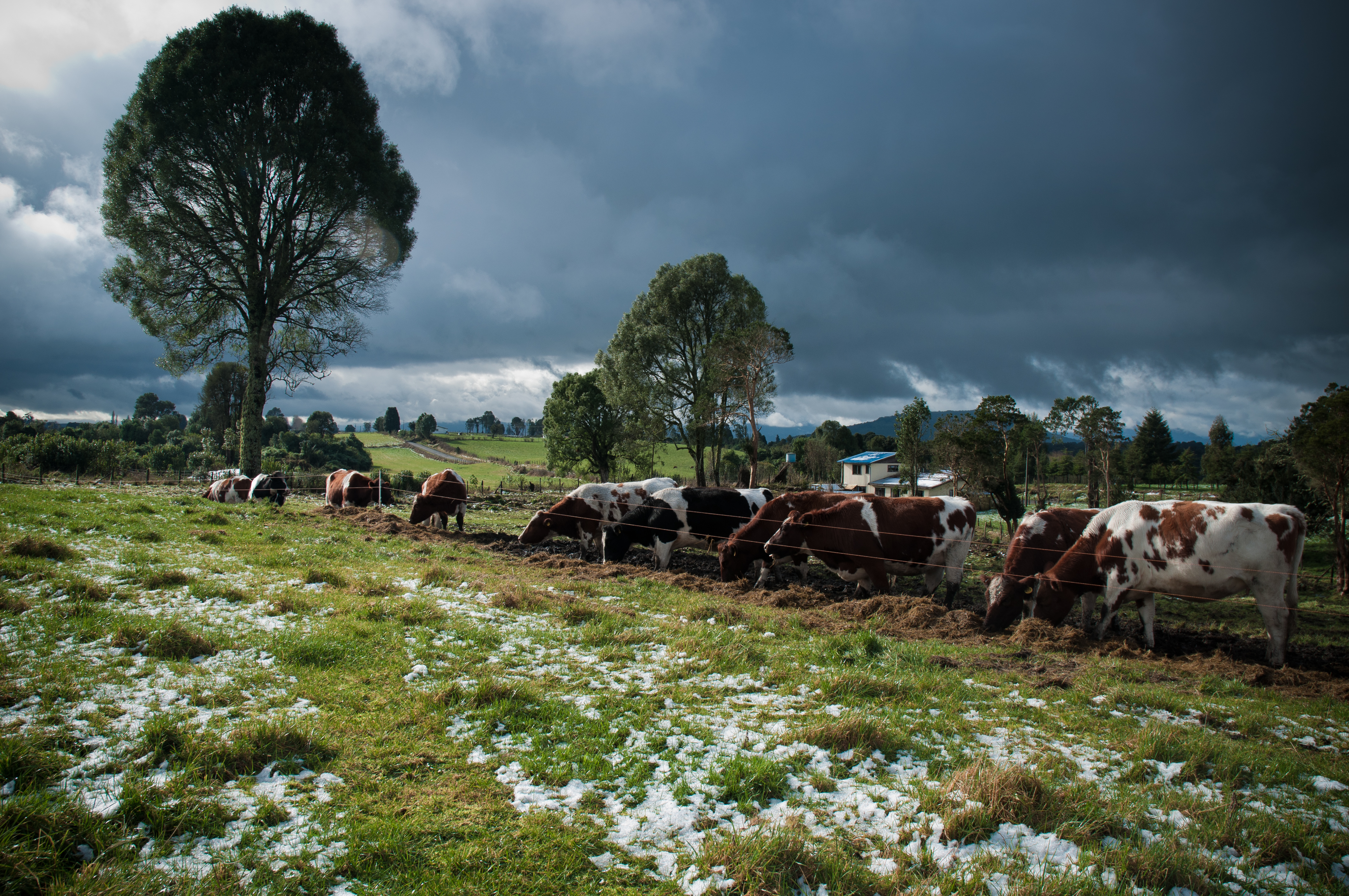
Cattle farming near Rupanco Lake in Osorno Province.

The Osorno Steer (Spanish: Novillo de Osorno) is the meat of young male cattle from the vicinity of Osorno, including parts of Los Ríos Region, in southern Chile. The origins of the Osorno Steer as a recognisable product of prestige in the Chilean meat market can be traced to the early 20th century when Osorno attained status as one of Chile's two main cattle farming areas. Later in the 20th century Osorno rose to become the unrivaled cattle farming area of Chile.

== See also ==
- Austral (wine region)
