= Bruce Strickrott =

American Deep Sea Explorer (born 1964)

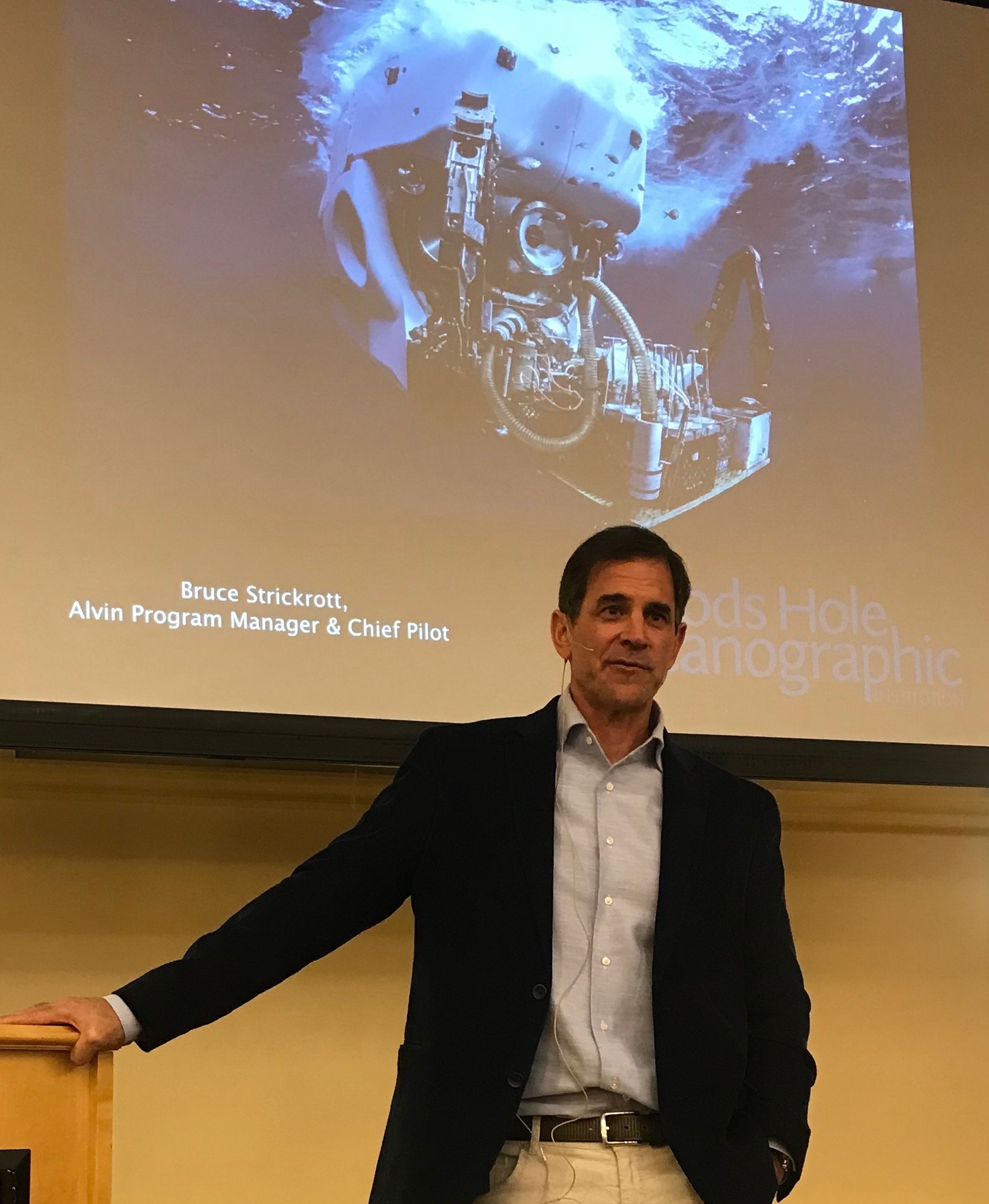
- Strickrott at Mystic Seaport
- Born: William "Bruce" Strickrott; December 18, 1964 (age 61); Takoma Park, Maryland, US
- Education: Florida Atlantic University Boca Raton, Florida
- Employer(s): Woods Hole Oceanographic Institution; DSV Alvin Group
- Spouse: Genai Strickrott (née Corban)
- Children: 2
- Military career
- Allegiance: United States
- Branch: United States Navy
- Service years: 1986–1992
- Rank: Petty Officer First Class
- Commands: USS Horne, USS Fox
- Conflicts: Operation Earnest Will, Operation Desert Storm
- Awards: Good Conduct Medal, Southwest Asian Service Medal

William "Bruce" Strickrott (born December 18, 1964) is an American ocean engineer, US Navy Deep Submergence Vehicle Pilot and deep sea explorer. He is the Senior Pilot and manager of the DSV Alvin Submersible Engineering and Operations Group at the Woods Hole Oceanographic Institution (WHOI) in Woods Hole, Massachusetts. Mr. Strickrott is an honorably discharged US Navy veteran and a Fellow National of The Explorers Club.

== Education and background ==
Strickrott grew up in Clifton Park, New York and attended Shenendehowa High School graduating in 1982. His initial exposure to deep sea science and exploration was from National Geographic magazine articles documenting Alvin's discovery of deep-sea hydrothermal vents and Dr. Robert Ballard's dives to the RMS Titanic in Alvin.

Strickrott enlisted in the US Navy in 1986 and after completing recruit training in San Diego, California, he was transferred to Naval Station Great Lakes where he qualified as a Fire Control technician. During six years of active duty he served on two Belknap-class guided-missile cruisers, the USS Horne (CG-30) and the USS Fox (CG-33). Strickrott was honorably discharged from the US Navy in 1992 as a Petty Officer First Class (E-6). After the Navy, Strickrott attended Florida Atlantic University (FAU) in Boca Raton, Florida studying Ocean Engineering. In 1996, he graduated cum laude with a Bachelor of Science in Ocean Engineering and was subsequently inducted into the Tau Beta Pi and Phi Kappa Phi national honor societies.

In September 1996, Strickrott joined the DSV Alvin Group at the Woods Hole Oceanographic Institution as an ocean engineer and Alvin Pilot in Training (PIT). In December 1999 he officially qualified as a US Navy Deep Submergence Pilot, becoming the 56th civilian to earn the US Navy Deep Submergence Officer Insignia.

== Career ==
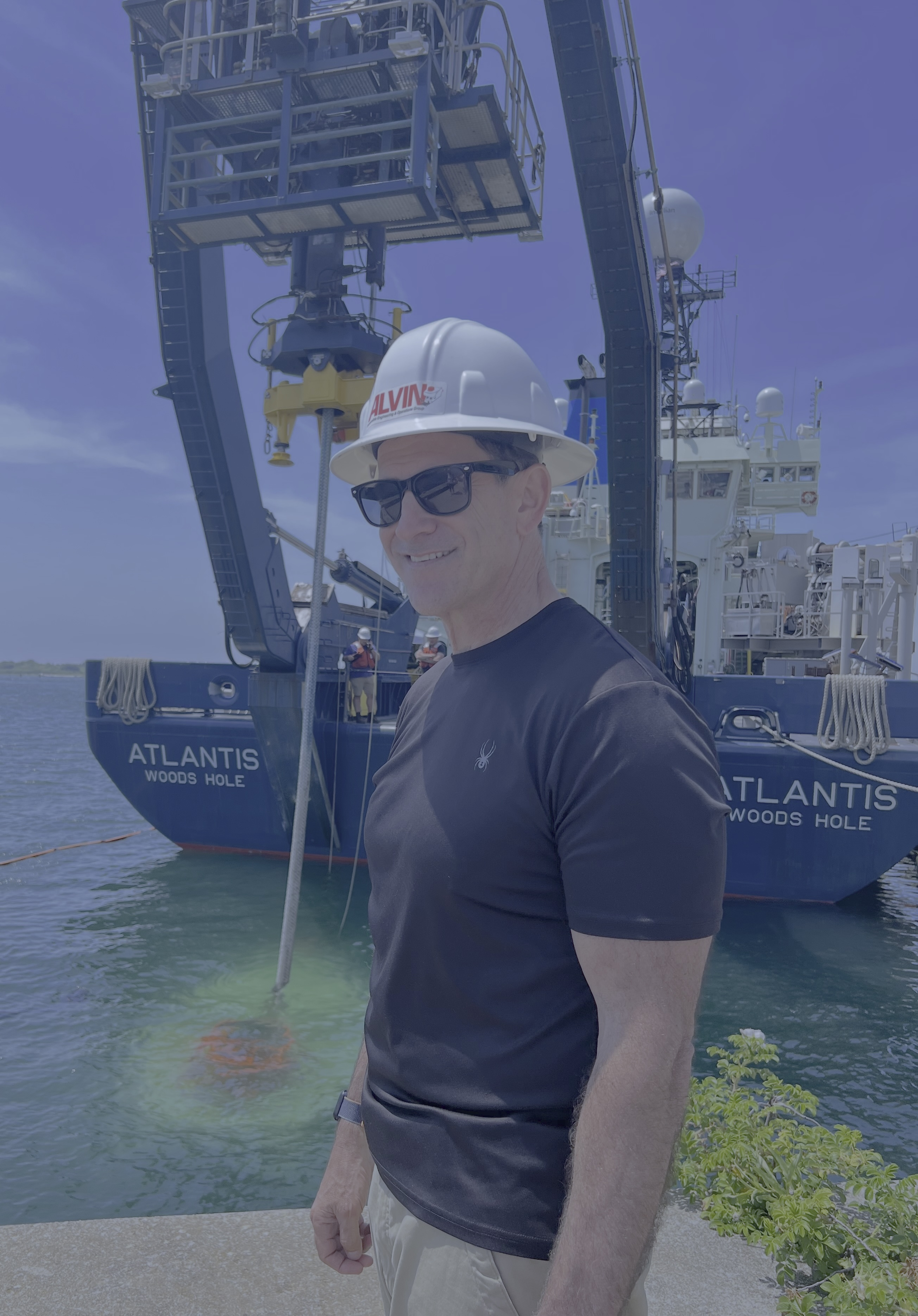
Bruce Strickrott at the start of DSV Alvin 6500 meter sea trials in 2022

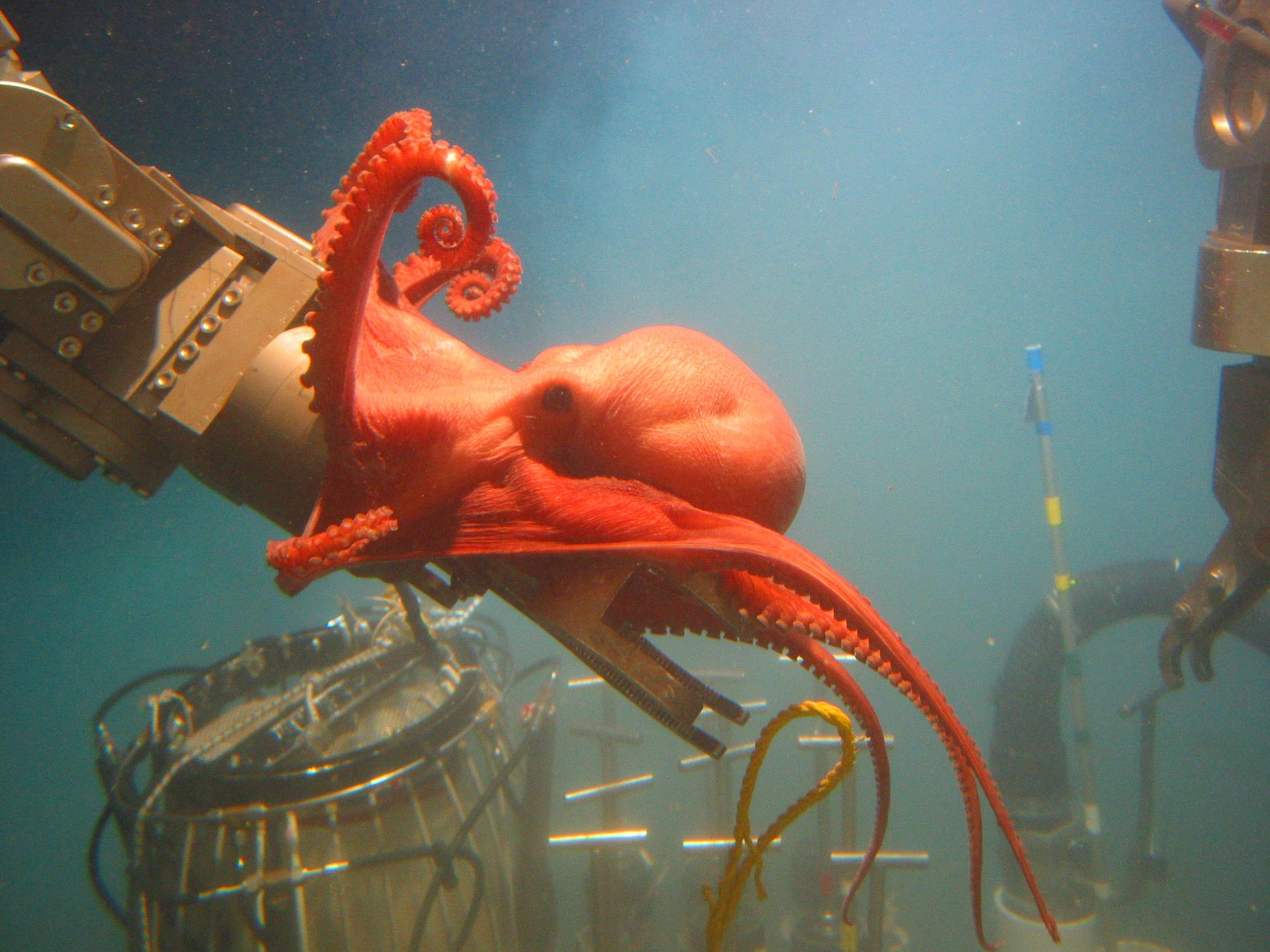
Red octopus clinging to Alvin manipulator arm photo by Bruce Strickrott

=== Diving and expedition ===
In August 2004, during an Alvin dive series along the Gulf of Alaska seamounts, Strickrott collected a very large new species of bamboo coral. The large coral is now displayed in the Smithsonian Institution Sant Ocean Hall

In 2014, Strickrott took over management of the Alvin Submersible Engineering and Operations Group (SEOG), and in 2022 led the effort to complete Alvin's major upgrade for operations to 6,500 meters. He was the Chief Scientist for the sea -trials dive expedition to the Puerto Rico Trench, that completed Alvin's US Navy Certification and first dives to the new depth. As of October 2025 Mr. Strickrott has completed over 400 dives in Alvin, accumulating over 3000 hours submerged.

In August 2018, during the Project Deep Search dive series, Bruce piloted Alvin when Dr. Erik Cordes discovered a previously unknown extensive deep sea coral reef, off the coast of South Carolina.

In April 2023, Strickrott piloted Alvin during the Galapagos Deep 2023 Expedition. The expedition discovered numerous pristine deep sea coral reefs in the Galapagos Marine Reserve.

In March 2025, Strickrott led the Alvin expedition to visit and image the wreck of the USS F-1, a United States World War 1 submarine lost off the coast of San Diego, California in December 1917.

Strickrott has participated on over 150 research expeditions with Alvin, aboard the R/V Atlantis (AGOR-25), as an Alvin pilot and Expedition Leader.

=== New species discovery ===
During his career as an Alvin pilot, Strickrott has had two species of deep sea animals named in his honor, in recognition of his piloting expertise and dedication to ocean science and exploration. Strickrott found a new species of deep sea hagfish in March 2005, during Alvin dive number 4089 along the southern East Pacific Rise. The new hagfish was the first to be discovered at a Hydrothermal vent and is named Eptatretus strickrotti, "Strickrott's Hagfish".

Strickrott helped discover a new species of deep sea polychaete worm During his dives in 2009 and 2018, near Methane Seeps in the Pacific Ocean off Costa Rica. The discovery includes the new genus, Pectinereis. Researchers named the new polychaete worm, Pectinereis strickrotti, in recognition of his role in its discovery.

=== Film & Television ===
Strickrott has been featured in a number of documentary films and programs including:

- Volcanoes of the Deep Sea (2020)
- Bruce and Alvin (2021)
- Acid Horizon (2021)
- Discover Wonder, the Octopus Garden (2021)
- Changing Seas, Episode 1303 Alvin: Pioneer of the Deep (2021)
