= Eptatretus strickrotti =

Conservation status
- Least Concern (IUCN 3.1)

Scientific classification
- Kingdom: Animalia
- Phylum: Chordata
- Infraphylum: Agnatha
- Class: Myxini
- Order: Myxiniformes
- Family: Myxinidae
- Genus: Eptatretus
- Species: E. strickrotti

Binomial name
- Eptatretus strickrotti Møller & W. J. Jones, 2007

Species of jawless fish

Eptatretus strickrotti, commonly known as Strickrott's hagfish, is a hagfish of the genus Eptatretus, found in the depths of the Pacific Ocean south of Easter Island. The hagfish was found in March 2005 by DSV Alvin pilot Bruce Strickrott, and a year later was determined by scientists to be a new species. It is the first hagfish recorded from a hydrothermal vent.
