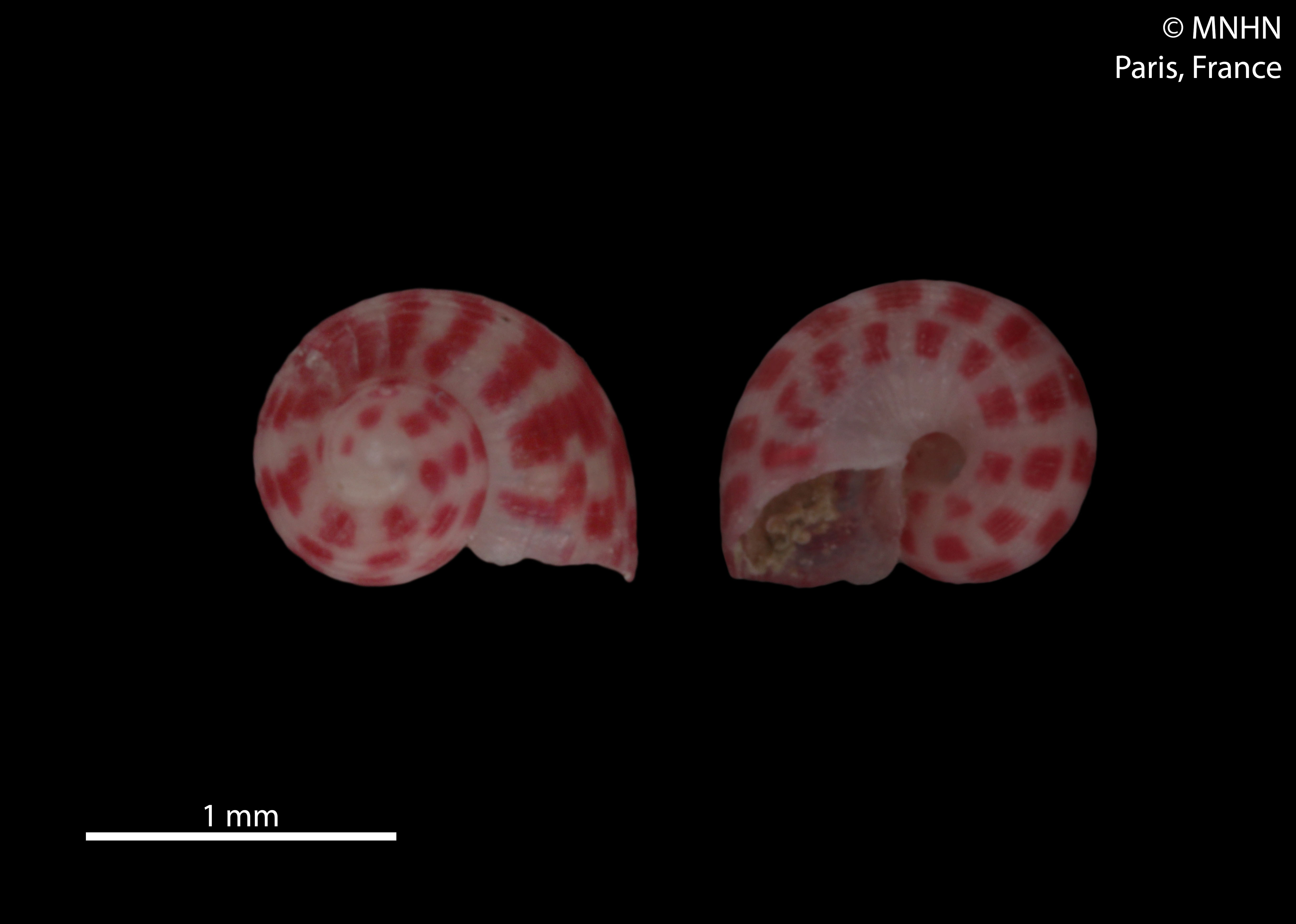
- Shell of Emiliotia rubrostriata

Scientific classification
- Kingdom: Animalia
- Phylum: Mollusca
- Class: Gastropoda
- Subclass: Vetigastropoda
- Order: Trochida
- Superfamily: Trochoidea
- Family: Colloniidae
- Subfamily: Colloniinae
- Genus: Emiliotia; Faber, 2006

Type species
- Bothropoma rubrostriatum Rolán, Rubio & Fernández-Garcés, 1997

= Emiliotia =

Genus of gastropods

Emiliotia is a genus of sea snails, marine gastropod mollusks in the family Colloniidae.

== Species ==
Species within the genus Emiliotia include:

- Emiliotia immaculata Ortea, Espinosa & Fernandez-Garcès, 2008
- Emiliotia juliocesari Fernández-Garcés, Rubio & Rolán, 2019
- Emiliotia rubrostriata (Rolán, Rubio, & Fernández-Garcés, 1997)

Species brought into synonymy

- Emiliotia inmaculatus [sic] : synonym of Emiliotia inmaculata Ortea, Espinosa & Fernández-Garcés, 2008 (wrong grammatical agreement of specific epithet)
