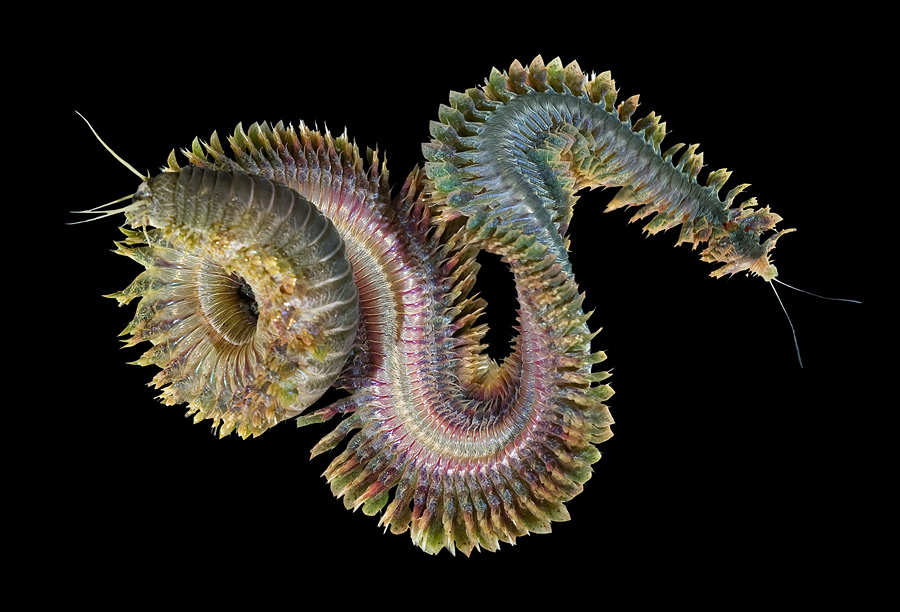

Scientific classification
- Kingdom: Animalia
- Phylum: Annelida
- Clade: Pleistoannelida
- Subclass: Errantia
- Order: Phyllodocida
- Family: Nereididae
- Genus: Alitta
- Species: A. virens

Binomial name
- Alitta virens (M. Sars, 1835)

Synonyms
- Nereis virens M. Sars, 1835; Neanthes virens (M. Sars, 1835); Nereis paucidentata Treadwell, 1939 *; Nereis dyamushi Izuka, 1912 *; Nereis grandis Stimpson, 1854 *; Nereis southerni Abdel-Moez & Humphries, 1955 *; Nereis yankiana Quatrefages, 1866 *

= Alitta virens =

Species of annelid worm

Alitta virens (common names include sandworm, sea worm, and king ragworm; older scientific names, including Nereis virens, are still frequently used) is an annelid worm that burrows in wet sand and mud.

It was first described by biologist Michael Sars in 1835. It is classified as a polychaete in the family Nereididae.

== Description ==
Sandworms have a blue head with two large pincer teeth. They typically reach ~30 centimetres (12 in) in size. The parapodia function both as external gills (the animal's primary respiratory surfaces), and as means of locomotion (appearing much like short legs).

== Ecology ==
Sandworms construct burrows of different shapes (I, U, J and Y). These range from being very complex to very simple. Long-term burrows are held together by mucus. Their burrows are not connected to each other; they are generally solitary creatures. The spacing between the burrows depends on how readily they can propagate water signals. Sandworm burrows are typically made between the high and low tide marks, and can reach up to a meter in depth.

Sandworms are abundant along European coasts and fjord environments, and dominate fully saline coastal areas where they have large distributions along with high biomass.

Sandworms are omnivores, and eat seaweed and microorganisms. Their diet consists of surface sediment, plant and animal remains. They are oftentimes exposed to metals through their diet and their burrowing habits.

Usually, sandworms are gonochoric, meaning that they reproduce sexually between the males and females of the species. Sandworms reproduce via a process termed 'swarming'. The female sandworm releases pheromones that attract males to release sperm. Then, the female sandworm ejects eggs to have them fertilized. The production of gametes occurs via the metanephridia gland. The eggs hatch into planktonic trochophore larvae, which develop into benthic juveniles.

== Interactions with humans ==
Sandworms make up a large part of the live sea-bait industry. In the United Kingdom, king ragworms are frequently harvested directly on beaches alongside the lesser ragworm, Perinereis cultrifera, often by using pronged garden forks to avoid breaking the worm. The king ragworm is frequently harvested alongside the unrelated common ragworm, Perinereis cultrifera, which lives in the same areas. To fulfill the needs of this industry, some sandworms are commercially grown. Sandworming, the harvesting of sandworms from mudflats, employs over 1,000 people in Maine, US. As of 2006, the population of sandworms had diminished greatly over the preceding few years due in large part to overharvesting before the worms are able to reproduce by spawning.

Sandworms are also used as study organisms in investigations of metal uptake in marine biology, as their burrowing habits, preference for coastal and estuarine environments, and detritivorous diets expose them readily to metal buildup in marine sediments. Alitta virens in particular is considered a valuable study subject in northern Europe due to being a large-bodied species and frequently the dominant type of polychaete in coastal environments.

== Gallery ==
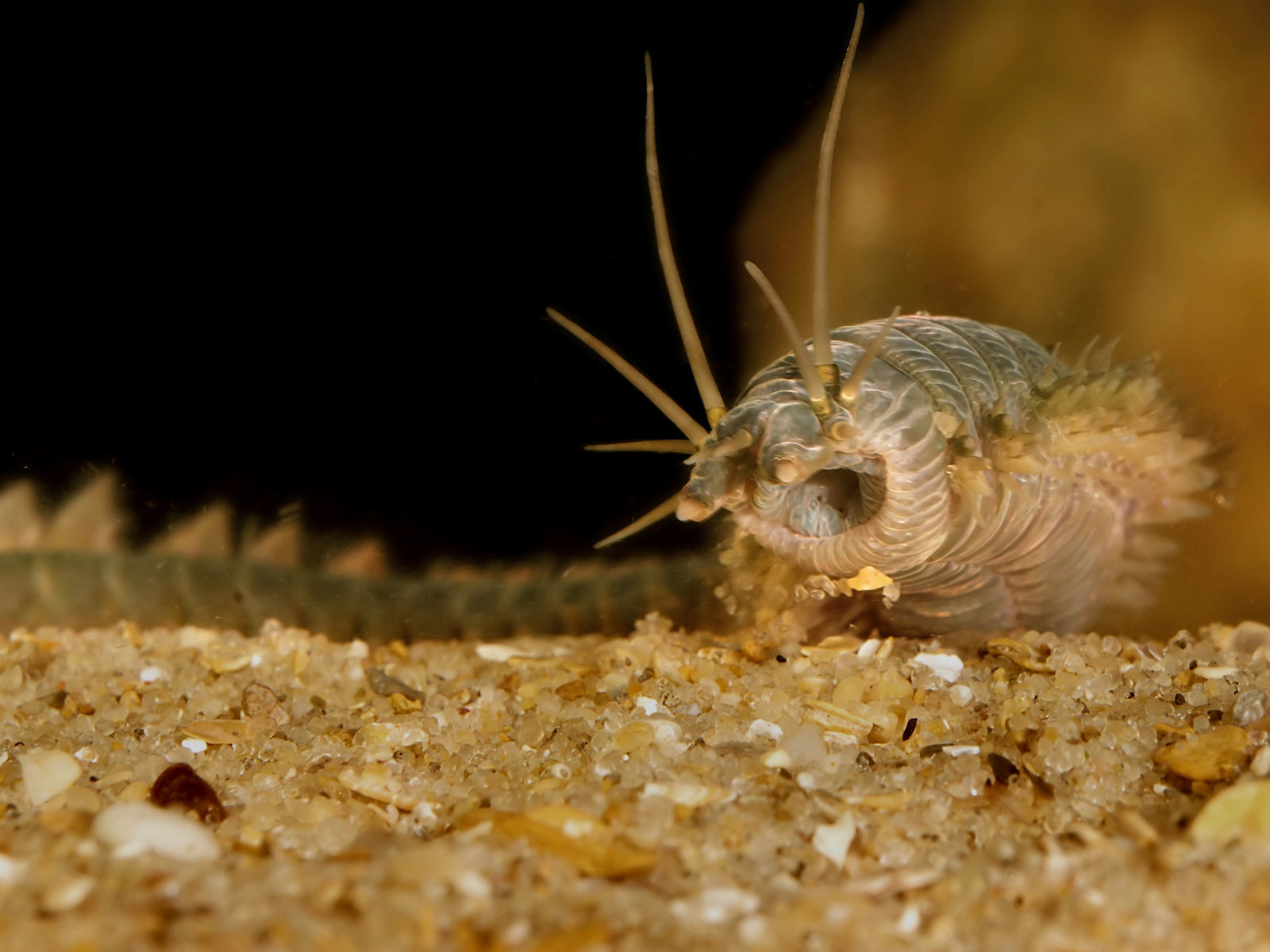

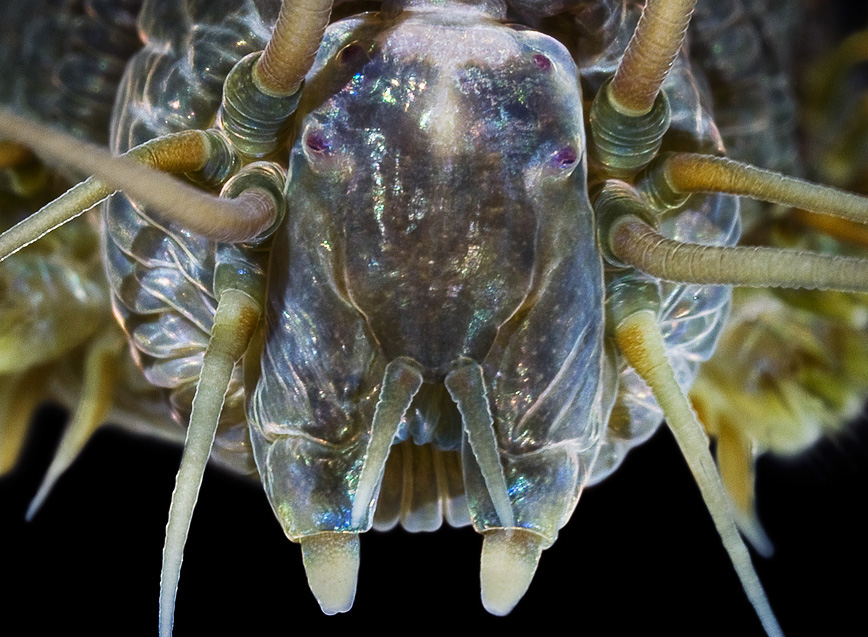

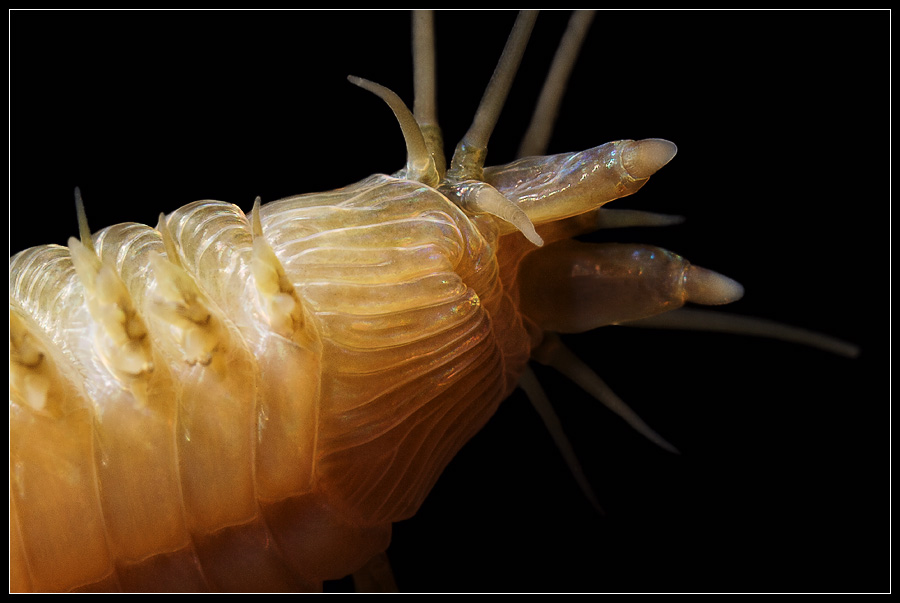

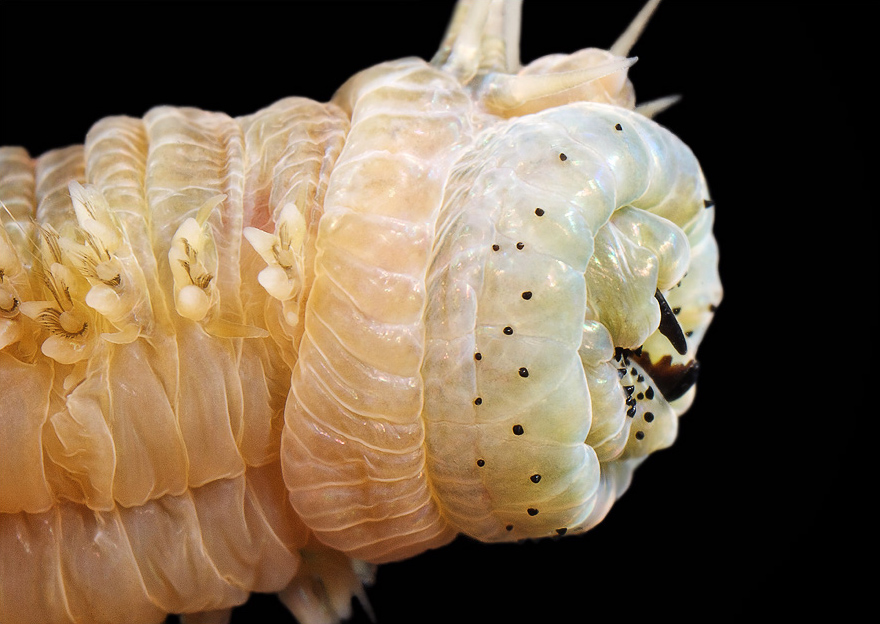

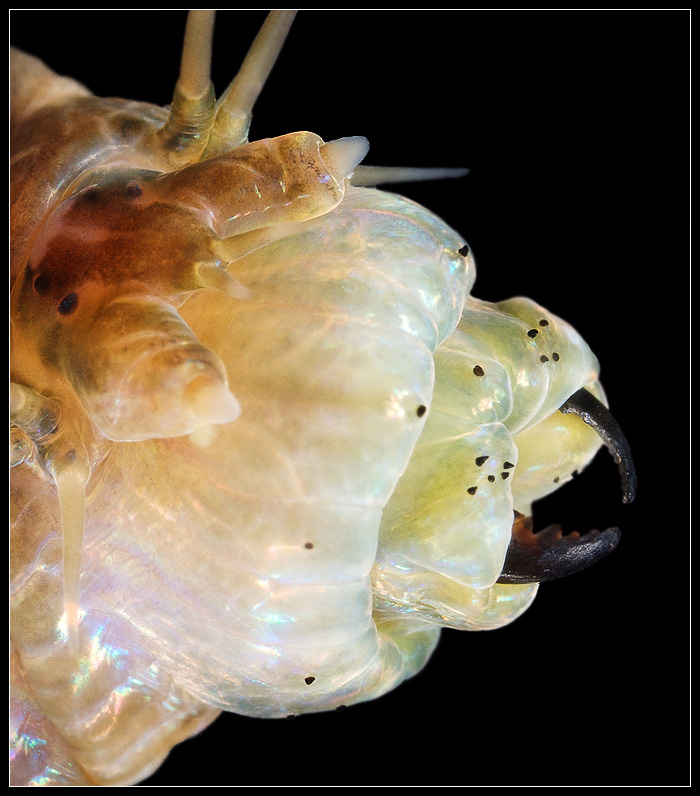

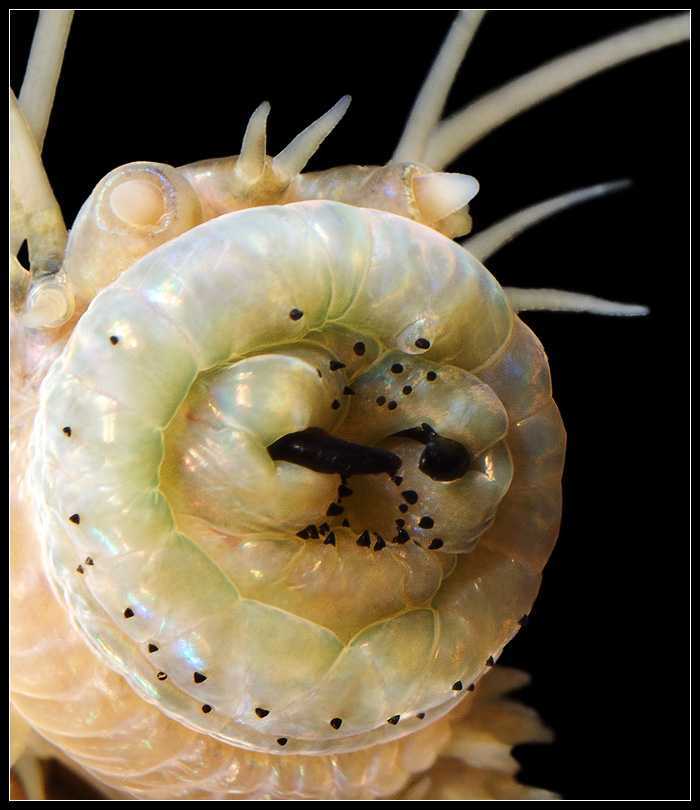
