= Austral (wine region) =

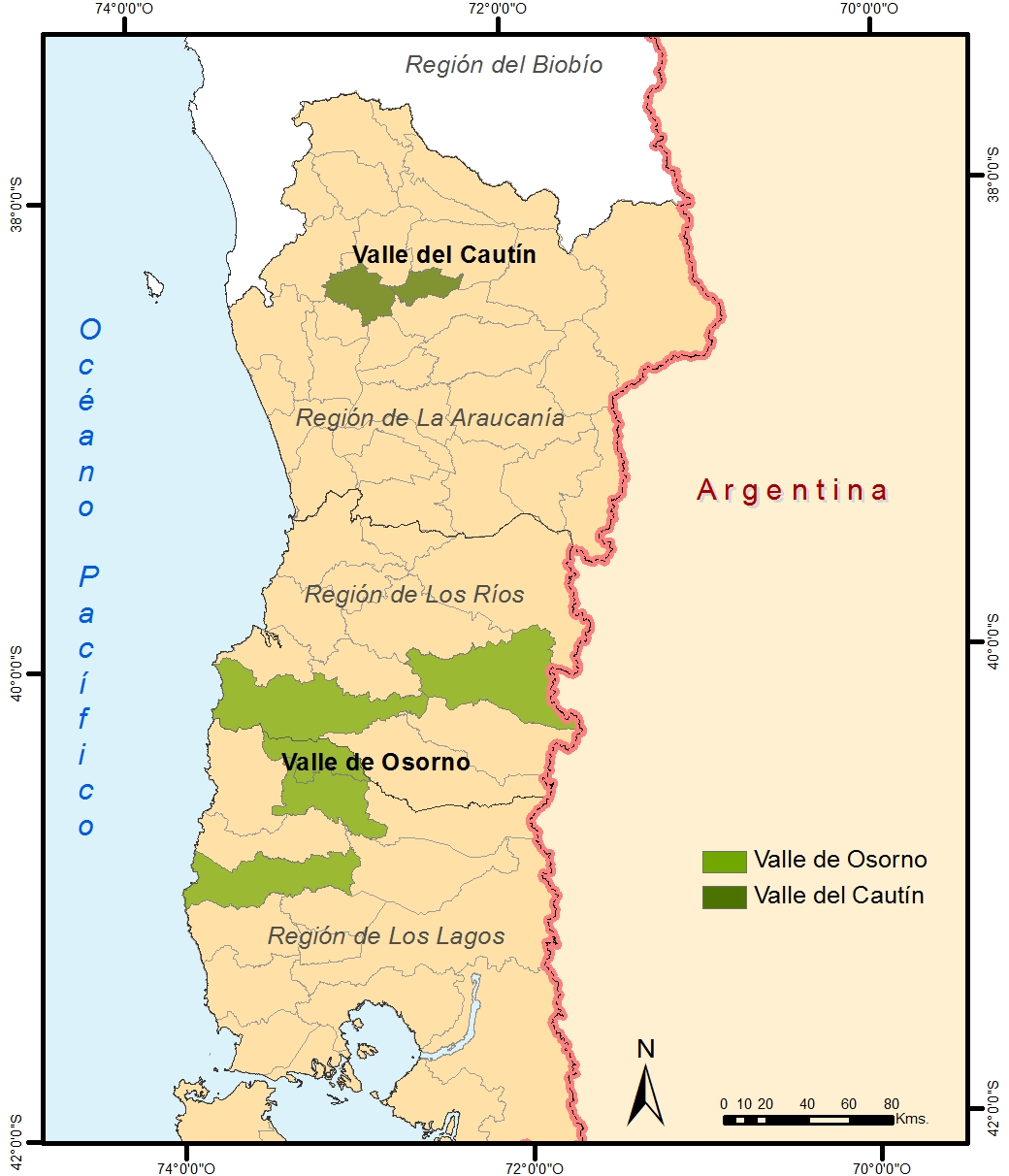
Communes in southern Chile that are part of the Austral Region.

The Austral wine region is one of the six official wine regions of Chile. The region is recognised by Decreto de Agricultura nº 464 of 14 December 1994, which established the regions and rules of origin. Chilean wine using the label Austral must have at least 3/4 of its content made in the Austral Region.

== See also ==
- Osorno Steer
