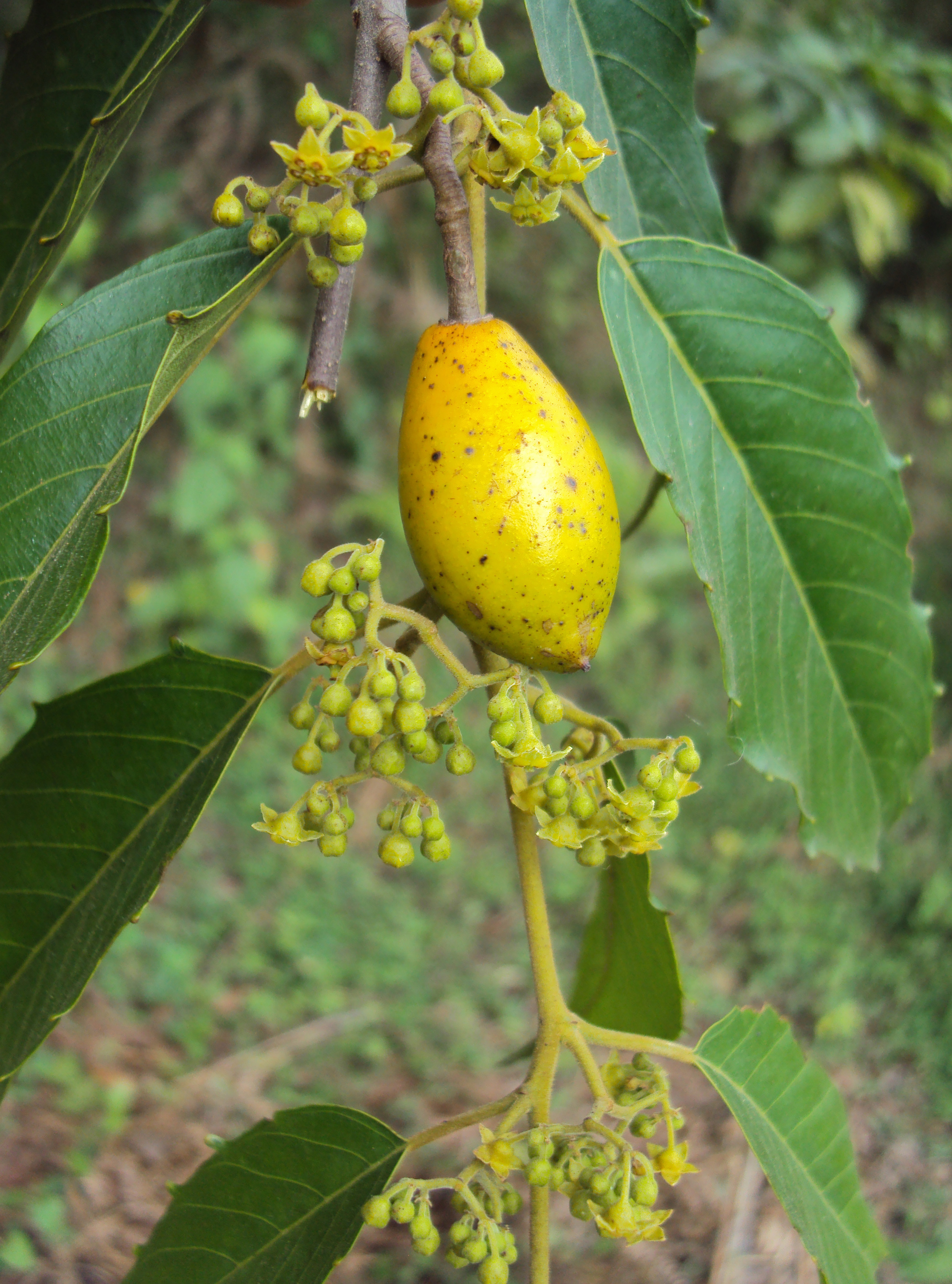
- Leaves, flowers and fruit

Conservation status
- Least Concern (IUCN 3.1)

Scientific classification
- Kingdom: Plantae
- Clade: Tracheophytes
- Clade: Angiosperms
- Clade: Eudicots
- Clade: Rosids
- Order: Rosales
- Family: Rhamnaceae
- Tribe: Maesopsideae; Weberb.
- Genus: Maesopsis; Engl.
- Species: M. eminii

Binomial name
- Maesopsis eminii Engl.

Synonyms
- Karlea Pierre; Karlea berchemioides Pierre; Maesopsis berchemioides (Pierre) A.Chev.; Maesopsis eminii subsp. berchemioides (Pierre) N.Hallé; Maesopsis tessmannii Engl.

= Maesopsis =

Genus of trees

Maesopsis eminii, the umbrella tree, is a species of tree in the family Rhamnaceae found in tropical Africa. It is the only species in the genus Maesopsis. It is often grown as a plantation tree, and as a shade tree in coffee plantations and other crops. Birds and monkeys may disperse the seeds. Since this tree grows fast it is often used for regeneration of destroyed forest lands. Its timber is used for construction and firewood and its leaves for animal fodder.

== Description ==
Maesopsis eminii is a large, fast-growing semi-deciduous tree growing to a height of about 30 m (100 ft). The trunk is straight with a clear bole for the lowest third. The bark is greyish-brown and deeply furrowed. The branches are mostly horizontal causing the crown to be flat, although it becomes more rounded as the tree ages. The leaves are simple and elliptic-lanceolate, with toothed margins, 6 cm to 15 cm × 2 cm to 5 cm (2.4 in to 5.9 in × 0.8 in to 2.0 in), glossy above, with a gland in each tooth. On the underside of the leaves there are domatia in the axils of the secondary nerves. The inflorescence is a many-flowered cyme up to 5 cm (2 in) long, each greenish-yellow flower having five calyx lobes that are longer than the corolla lobes and a single anther. The fruit is a drupe up to 3.5 cm (1.4 in) long, green at first, turning yellow and then purple-black as it ripens. It contains a large stone with one or two black seeds inside.

== Distribution and habitat ==
Maesopsis eminii is native to much of West and Central Africa, its range extending from Liberia, the Congo and Angola to Uganda. It has become established in Sudan, Somalia, Ethiopia, Kenya, Tanzania and Zambia. It was introduced into the Usambara Mountains in eastern Tanzania between 1930 and 1970, where it became an invasive species in the submontane rainforest, now being the dominant species of tree there. It is a pioneer species, found in humid forests, colonising cleared areas and flourishing as secondary growth. It is often present in the border zone between savannah and forest.

== Ecology ==
The tree starts flowering when only a few years old. The flowers are hermaphroditic and are probably pollinated by insects with one or two fruits usually developing per inflorescence. Monkeys and large birds such as hornbills help to disperse the seed by carrying the fruit away to consume elsewhere. Where the trees become established the previous root mat disappears, the leaf litter becomes thinner, the soil pH rises and the biodiversity of ground plants and animals decreases.

== Uses ==
Maesopsis eminii is a useful timber tree. The sapwood is pale and the heartwood is olive-brown to deep red. It is used for poles, boxes and crates but is susceptible to damage by termites and to rotting when in continual contact with wet ground. The wood is used for fuel and the foliage for fodder. The tree is planted to provide shade for such crops as coffee, cocoa and cardamom, and is often grown domestically in gardens for the same purpose.
