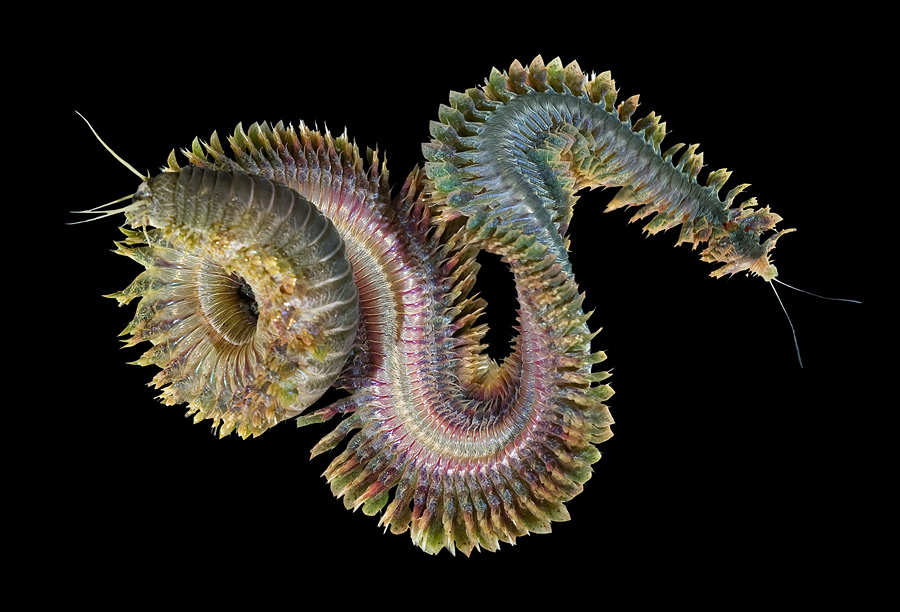
- Alitta virens, also known as the king ragworm
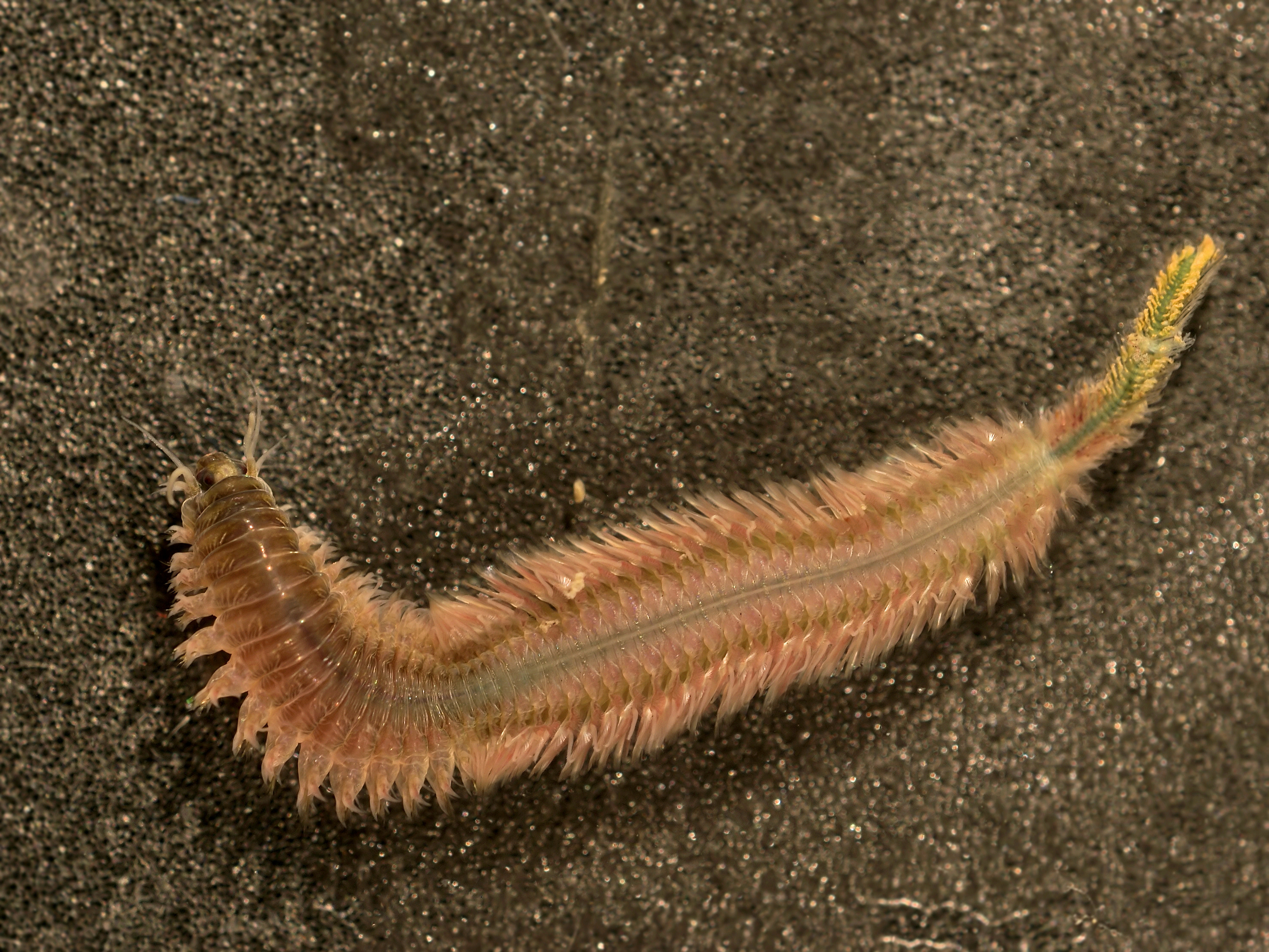
- Alitta succinea

Scientific classification
- Domain: Eukaryota
- Kingdom: Animalia
- Phylum: Annelida
- Clade: Pleistoannelida
- Subclass: Errantia
- Order: Phyllodocida
- Family: Nereididae
- Subfamily: Nereidinae
- Genus: Alitta; Bakken & Wilson, 2005

Species
- Alitta grandis (Stimpson, 1853); Alitta succinea (Frey & Leuckart, 1847); Alitta virens (M. Sars, 1835)

= Alitta =

Genus of marine annelids

Alitta is a genus of marine annelids in Nereididae family (commonly known as sandworms or ragworms). There are three recognised species within the genus, Alitta grandis (Stimpson, 1853), Alitta succinea (Frey & Leuckart, 1847) and Alitta virens (M. Sars, 1835). Alitta brandti Malmgren, 1865 was originally considered part of the genus, but is now accepted as Neanthes brandti (Malmgren, 1865).
