= Dispersal of invasive species by ballast water =

The dispersal of invasive species by ballast water refers to the unintentional introduction of invasive species to new habitats via the ballast water carried by commercial shipping vessels. Ballast water spreads an estimated 7000 living species to new habitats across the globe. These species can affect the ecological balance of their new regions by outcompeting native species or otherwise impacting native ecosystems.

== Ballast water ==
Diagram depicts invasive species being transported to and discharged into non-native habitats.

The purpose of ballast water is to provide transverse stability, improve propulsion and maneuverability, and to compensate for weight loss due to fuel and water consumption. Approximately 10 billion tons of ballast water is transported each year, accounting for 90% of our world trade. Typically, ballast water discharge contains a variety of biological materials including non-native, invasive, and exotic species that can cause extensive ecological and economic damage to aquatic ecosystems.

Throughout this process, large ships withdraw up to 20 million gallons of water at their specific loading ports. Including native species; both plant and animal, before disposing them at their next destination. However, when these invasive species are unloaded, specific conditions like temperature, salinity, lack of resources, and predator-to-prey competition affects how foreign species survive in non-native habitats. These factors cause stress within the ecosystems, throwing off ecological and environmental balance.

As new species are introduced to non-native ecosystems, interspecific competition often becomes more intense. If native species are out-competed by invasive species, it can affect the established predator-prey relationships within that region, possibly having disruptive effects on the wider food web.

== Invasive species ==
=== Freshwater zebra mussel ===
Dreissena polymorpha, commonly known as the zebra mussel, live in freshwater and are native to southern lakes in Russia and Ukraine. The zebra mussel has become an invasive species that is frequently spread via ballast water. In North America, Great Britain, Ireland, Italy, Spain, and Sweden, the species has invaded native habitats. The mussels take oxygen and food from the water, limiting the resources available for native species and disrupting local ecosystems. Zebra mussels can have a significant impact on algae in the habitats they invade. Invasive zebra mussels, often in monotypic populations, have been shown to damage abiotic components found in invaded habitats such as boats, waterways, harbors, water treatment plants, and power plants.

=== Sea walnut ===
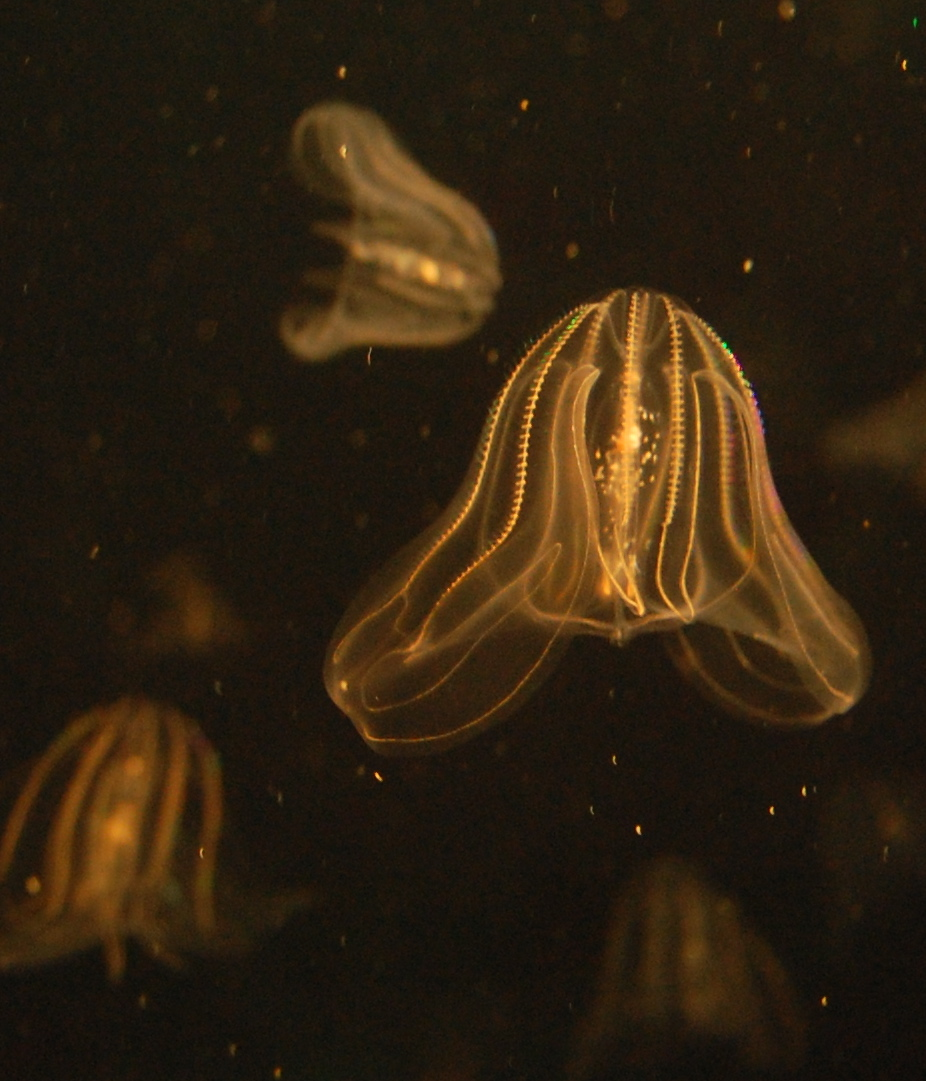
Mnemiopsis leidyi, commonly known as the Sea Walnut.

Mnemiopsis leidyi, commonly known as the sea walnut, is a ctenophore species native to the eastern coast of North and South America. Currently, Mnemiopsis leidyi has become invasive through the transfer of ballast water to the Black, Azov, Aegean and Marmara Seas, west coast of Sweden, and the Southern and Northern Baltic Sea. This carnivorous species feeds on zooplankton, crustaceans, fish eggs and larvae. Some individuals are known to consume individuals of their own species. Specifically, Mnemiopsis sp. has become an ecological problem for local fisheries because they have been linked to the diminishing zooplankton population.

=== Green crab ===
Carcinus maenas, commonly known as the green crab, is native to the Baltic Sea and the northeastern Atlantic Ocean. This species has become invasive to North America, South Africa, South America, Asia, and Australia. This widely spread invasive species is often distributed by ship ballast water. C. maenas is a voracious predator to many species such as worms, mollusks, oysters, and clams. The competitiveness and efficiency of this species out-competes native crabs and lobsters. Specifically, the green crab disrupts eelgrass beds, often home to diverse fish populations. For aquaculture and fishing industries, C. maenas poses a particular threat due to its appetite for valuable farmed mollusks.

== See also ==
- Ballast water discharge and the environment
- Climate change and invasive species
