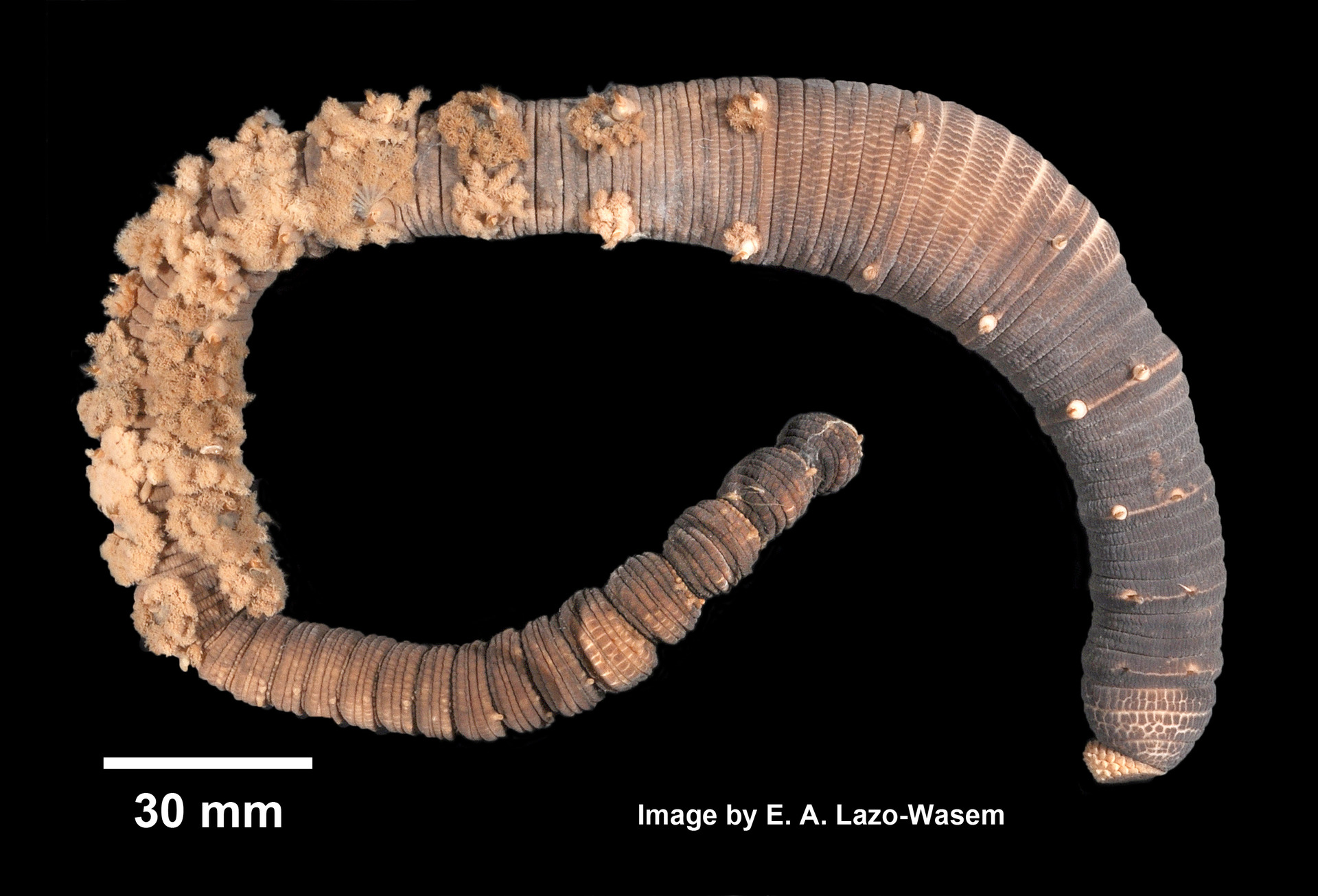

Scientific classification
- Kingdom: Animalia
- Phylum: Annelida
- Clade: Pleistoannelida
- Clade: Sedentaria
- Clade: Maldanomorpha
- Family: Arenicolidae
- Genus: Arenicola
- Species: A. cristata

Binomial name
- Arenicola cristata Stimpson, 1856

= Arenicola cristata =

Species of annelid

Arenicola cristata, commonly known as the American lugworm, is a species of marine annelid in the lugworm family, Arenicolidae.

== Description ==
Arenicola cristata has a vermiform body that can reach up to 30 cm (12 in) long and 2.5 cm (1 in) wide. The firm and sturdy body is thick in the front with a tapering head and posterior. The body can be green, black, or red. The head lacks appendages and eyes. The mouth has a bulbous proboscis covered with fingerlike projections. The body can be divided into three main regions. The front region is the most robust and muscular, with setae hooks. The central region is covered in red or black branching branchiae. The final section is the least developed.

== Distribution ==
Arenicola cristata is found along the east coast of the United States from Cape Cod to Florida and Louisiana, as well as along the entire west coast of the United States. The lugworm can also be found in Spain and China.

== Habitat ==
Arenicola cristata burrow in shallow sandy substrates and mudflats in protect areas. Typically, their burrows are near the low tide line or just below.
