= Disconatis =

Scientific classification
- Domain: Eukaryota
- Kingdom: Animalia
- Phylum: Annelida
- Clade: Pleistoannelida
- Subclass: Errantia
- Order: Phyllodocida
- Family: Polynoidae
- Genus: Disconatis; Hanley & Burke, 1988

Type species
- Disconatis contubernalis Hanley & Burke, 1988

Genus of annelid worms

Disconatis is a genus of marine annelids in the family Polynoidae (scale worms). The genus includes two species which are both commensal with other kinds of marine Annelida and occur in Australia and New Zealand.

== Species ==
As at September 2020, there are two species within Disconatis:

- Disconatis accolus
- Disconatis contubernalis

== Description ==
Disconatis is a long-bodied genus with up to 152 segments and 22–80 pairs of elytra which are small and translucent; the first pair are much larger than the following elytra. The lateral antennae are inserted ventral to the median antenna. The notopodium is vestigial and notochaetae are absent. The neuropodium is rounded and the neurochaetae are unidentate but have serrations on the convex side.

== Biology and ecology ==
Both known species of Disconatis are commensal, with each species living in the tubes of marine annelids in a different family: Arenicolidae and Maldanidae.
