= Disconatis accolus =

Scientific classification
- Domain: Eukaryota
- Kingdom: Animalia
- Phylum: Annelida
- Clade: Pleistoannelida
- Subclass: Errantia
- Order: Phyllodocida
- Family: Polynoidae
- Genus: Disconatis
- Species: D. accolus

Binomial name
- Disconatis accolus (Estcourt, 1967)

Species of annelid

Disconatis accolus is only known from New Zealand where it is commensal in the tubes of marine annelids of the family Arenicolidae.

== Description ==
Disconatis accolus is known from a single specimen with 152 segments and 76 pairs of elytra; the first pair are much larger than the following. It has smooth elytra but with minute papillae on the dorsal surface of the body, in contrast with the other species in the genus, Disconatis contubernalis which has large papillae on the elytra but a smooth body. The lateral antennae are inserted ventral to the median antenna. Notopodia are vestigial and notochaetae are absent. The neuropodia are rounded and the neurochaetae are unidentate but have serrations on the convex side.

== Biology and ecology ==
Disconatis accolus has a commensal relationship with the annelid Abarenicola affinis, where D. accolus lives inside the tubes it creates.
