= List of people from Guildford =

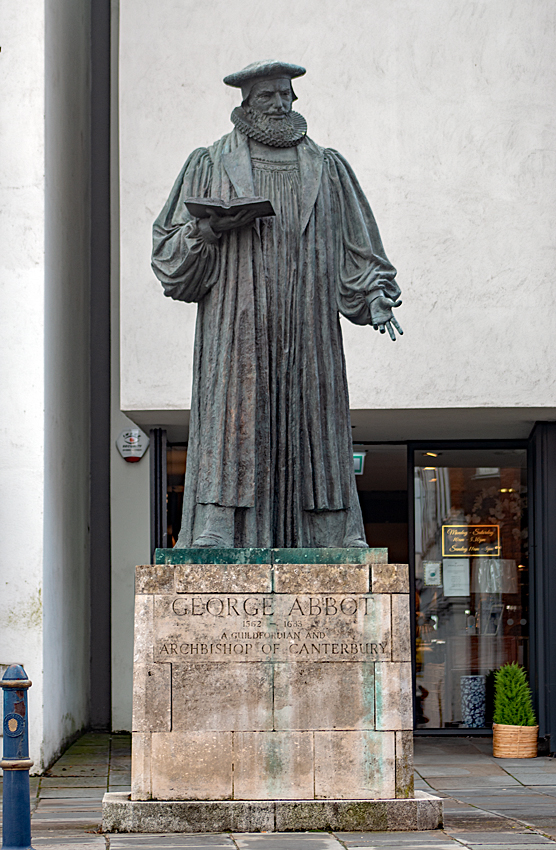
Statue of George Abbot, Archbishop of Canterbury, at the top of the High Street

This is a list of famous or notable people born in, or associated with, Guildford in England, who have a Wikipedia page.

Guildford is a town in west Surrey, around 27 mi (43 km) southwest of central London. The oldest surviving record of the town is from a c. 1000 copy of the c. 880 – c. 885 will of Alfred the Great, in which the settlement appears as Gyldeforda. The name is written as Gildeford in Domesday Book and later as Gyldeford (c. 1130), Guldeford (c. 1186 – c. 1198) and Guildeford (1226).

== Art and art criticism ==
John Russell (1745–1806), the portrait artist was born in Guildford and lived in the town until 1760. Roger Fry (1866–1934), the English artist, critic and member of the Bloomsbury Group, lived in "Durbins" in Chantry View Road, which he designed, from 1909 to 1919.

== Literature ==
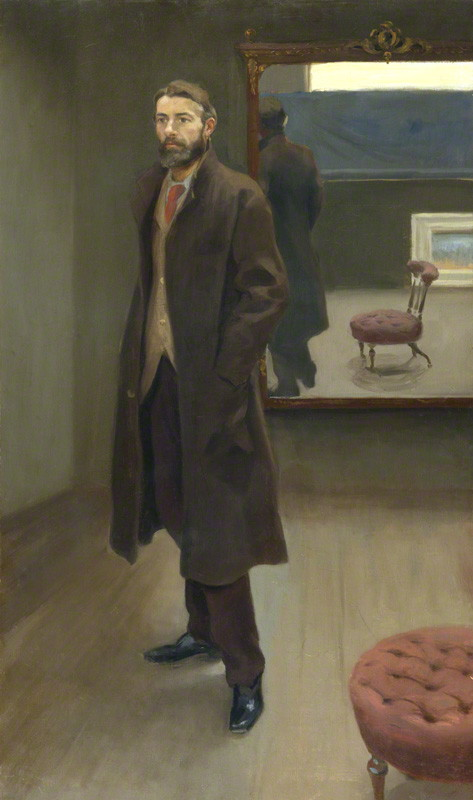
Edward Carpenter (1894) by the Guildford-born artist, Roger Fry (1866–1934)

Edward Carpenter (1844–1929), the socialist poet, philosopher, anthologist, and early activist for gay rights and animal rights, moved to the town after the First World War and lived there until his death. Charles Lutwidge Dodgson, who wrote under the pen name Lewis Carroll, died of pneumonia at his sisters' home, "The Chestnuts", in Guildford on 14 January 1898. His funeral was held at St Mary's Church. His body was buried at the Mount Cemetery in Guildford. Other authors include Gerald Seymour, writer of Harry's Game (born in Guildford in 1941) and New York Times film critic Mordaunt Hall, born in the town in 1878.

Author and humourist P. G. Wodehouse was born prematurely in Guildford in 1881 while his mother was visiting the town. Novelist Kazuo Ishiguro lived in Guildford as a child, having moved there at the age of six.

== Music ==
The Stranglers were based in the town in the early 1970s and were briefly known as "The Guildford Stranglers". Drummer Jet Black ran an off-licence in the town and bass player Jean-Jacques Burnel attended the Royal Grammar School. The band played their first gig at the Star Inn, in Quarry Street, in 1974, and were banned from performing at the University of Surrey on 11 October 1978. Progressive rock musicians Mike Rutherford (b. 1950), of Genesis, and Andrew Latimer (b. 1949), of the band Camel, were born in Guildford, as was jazz saxophonist Iain Ballamy (b. 1964).

In the early 21st century music, drum and bass producers Cause 4 Concern and Sub Focus are from the town.

== Science and mathematics ==
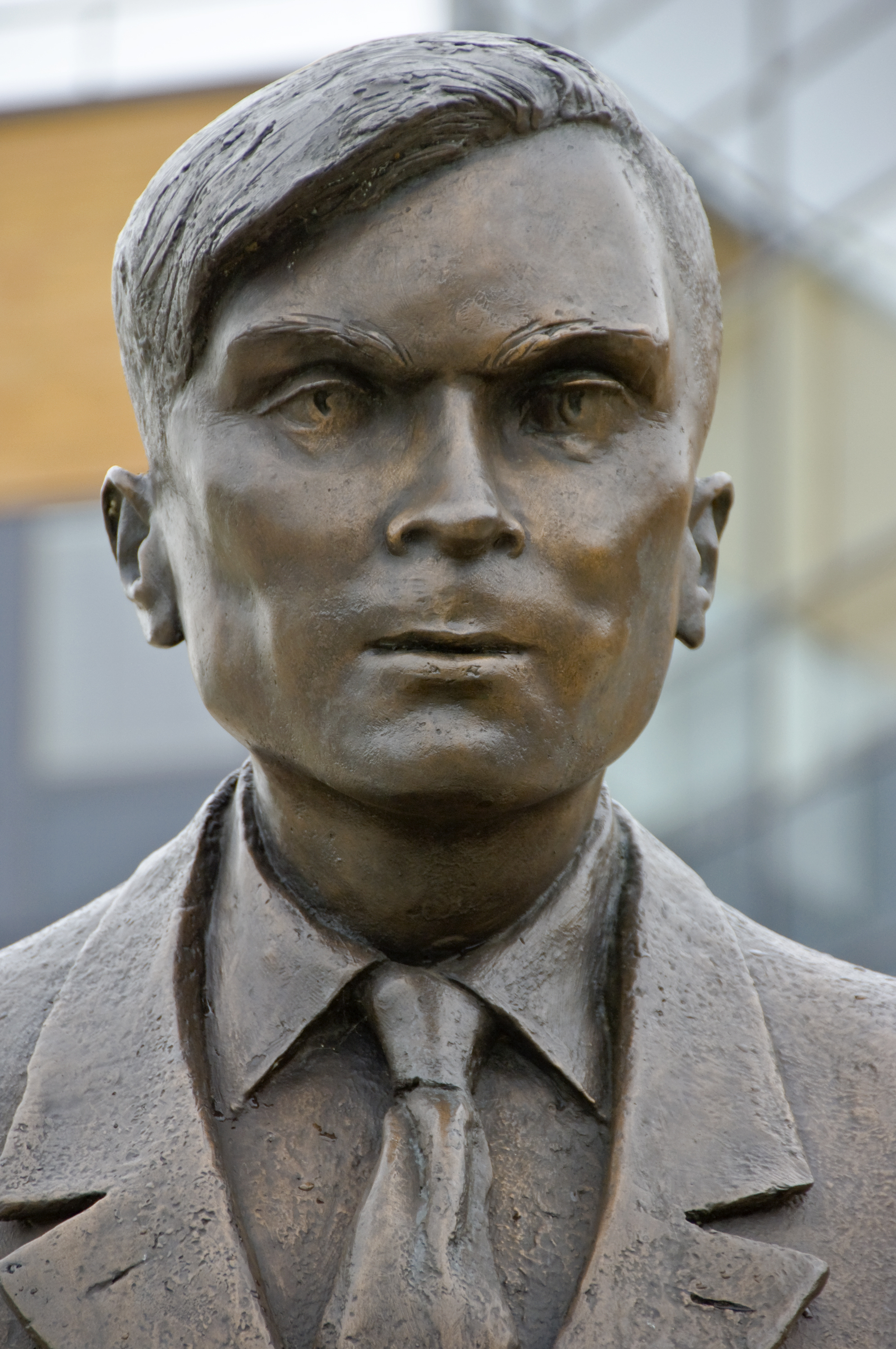
Statue of Alan Turing at the University of Surrey

The botanist, Thomas Moore (1821–1887), was born in Stoke-next-Guildford and lived in the town until 1839 Many of mathematician, logician and cryptographer, Alan Turing's earliest years were in this town where his family lived. British space scientist and science educator Maggie Aderin-Pocock (b. 1968) lives in Guildford.

== Journalism ==
Channel 4 News journalist Cathy Newman was born in the town. Holly Samos (b. 1970) radio researcher and presenter lives here as does BBC newsreader Michael Buerk (b. 1946). Bill Turnbull, journalist and radio and tv presenter, was born in Guildford.

== Theatre and film ==
Singer and actress Yvonne Arnaud lived near Guildford for many years, and the Yvonne Arnaud Theatre was named in her honour; later the town was the home of comic director, writer and actor Mackenzie Taylor (1978–2010).

Stuart Wilson (b. 1946), Christopher Gaze (b. 1952), Barry Evans (1943–1997), and David Hemmings (1941–2003) are from the town. Monty Python member Terry Jones (1942–2020) attended the Royal Grammar School.

Julie Dawn Cole (b. 1957), who played Veruca Salt in Willy Wonka & The Chocolate Factory, and Simon Bird (b. 1984), who played Will McKenzie in The Inbetweeners and Adam Goodman in Friday Night Dinner, were all born in Guildford. Comedian Holly Walsh (b. 1980) was also born in Guildford.

== Sport ==
Guildford has been home to racing driver Katherine Legge and sprinter Allan Wells, gold medallist in the 100 metres at the 1980 Olympics. Footballers John Hollins, David Howells and Alex McCarthy were born in the town. Footballer Matt Jarvis grew up in Guildford and the town is also home to Olympic kayakers Rachel Cawthorn and Liam Heath. Robert Hayward, the former UK No. 4 Thai Boxer, is a resident.

== Others ==
Cartoonist Piers Baker, who created Ollie and Quentin, lives in Guildford. Alfred Smith, recipient of the Victoria Cross, was born in Guildford, as was WWE wrestler Paul Burchill. Australian television personality, cookbook author and pastry chef Darren Purchese was born in Guildford. Murder victim Farah Fratta (née Baquer) was born and raised in Guildford before emigrating to Texas.

== Bibliography ==
- Gover, J.E.B.; Mawer, A.; Stenton, F.M. (1969). The place-names of Surrey. Cambridge: Cambridge University Press.
- Larkin, Colin, ed. (1992). The Guinness Who's Who of Jazz (1st ed.). Guinness Publishing. ISBN 0-85112-580-8.
- Roberts, Jerry (2010). The complete history of American film criticism. Santa Monica Press. ISBN 978-1-59-580049-7.
- Rose, David (2001). Guildford : Our town. Derby: Breedon Books. ISBN 978-1-85-983262-2.
- Spalding, Frances (1980). Roger Fry, art and life. Berkeley: University of California Press. ISBN 978-0-52-004126-4.
