= Notoproctus =

Scientific classification
- Kingdom: Animalia
- Phylum: Annelida
- Clade: Pleistoannelida
- Clade: Sedentaria
- Clade: Maldanomorpha
- Family: Maldanidae
- Subfamily: Notoproctinae; Detinova, 1982
- Genus: Notoproctus; Arwidsson, 1906

Type species
- Notoproctus oculatus Arwidsson, 1906

Species
- N. abyssus; N. godeffroyi; N. laevis; N. lineatus; N. oculatus; N. pacificus; N. scutiferus; N. sibogae

Genus of marine worms

Notoproctus is a genus of marine polychaete worms in the family Maldanidae. It is the only member of the subfamily Notoproctinae.

== Description ==
Notoproctus worms are characterized by the presence of cephalic and pygidial plates, a cephalic plate with a low rim, a wide prostomium that forms a low keel, strongly curved nuchal grooves, notochaetae with long and thick capillaries, neurochaetae shaped as acicular spines or reduced uncini in the first four chaetigers (i.e. segments with chaetae), subsequent chaetigers with a row of rostrate uncini, a pygidium with a flat pygidial plate with a low rim, and an anus dorsal to the plate. They have 10 to 17 chaetigers, and some achaetous (i.e. without chaetae) segments before the pygidium.

== Classification ==
This genus contains 9 species:

- Notoproctus abyssus Hartman & Fauchald 1971
- Notoproctus godeffroyi Augener 1922
- Notoproctus laevis (Fauchald 1972)
- Notoproctus lineatus Moore 1923
- Notoproctus oculatus Arwidsson 1906
- Notoproctus pacificus (Moore 1906)
- Notoproctus scutiferus Wesenberg-Lund 1948
- Notoproctus sibogae (Mesnil & Fauvel 1939)
