= Zoological specimen =

Animal or part of an animal preserved for scientific use

Jar contains preserved snakes, frogs, and other small amphibians, showcasing their anatomical features for study.

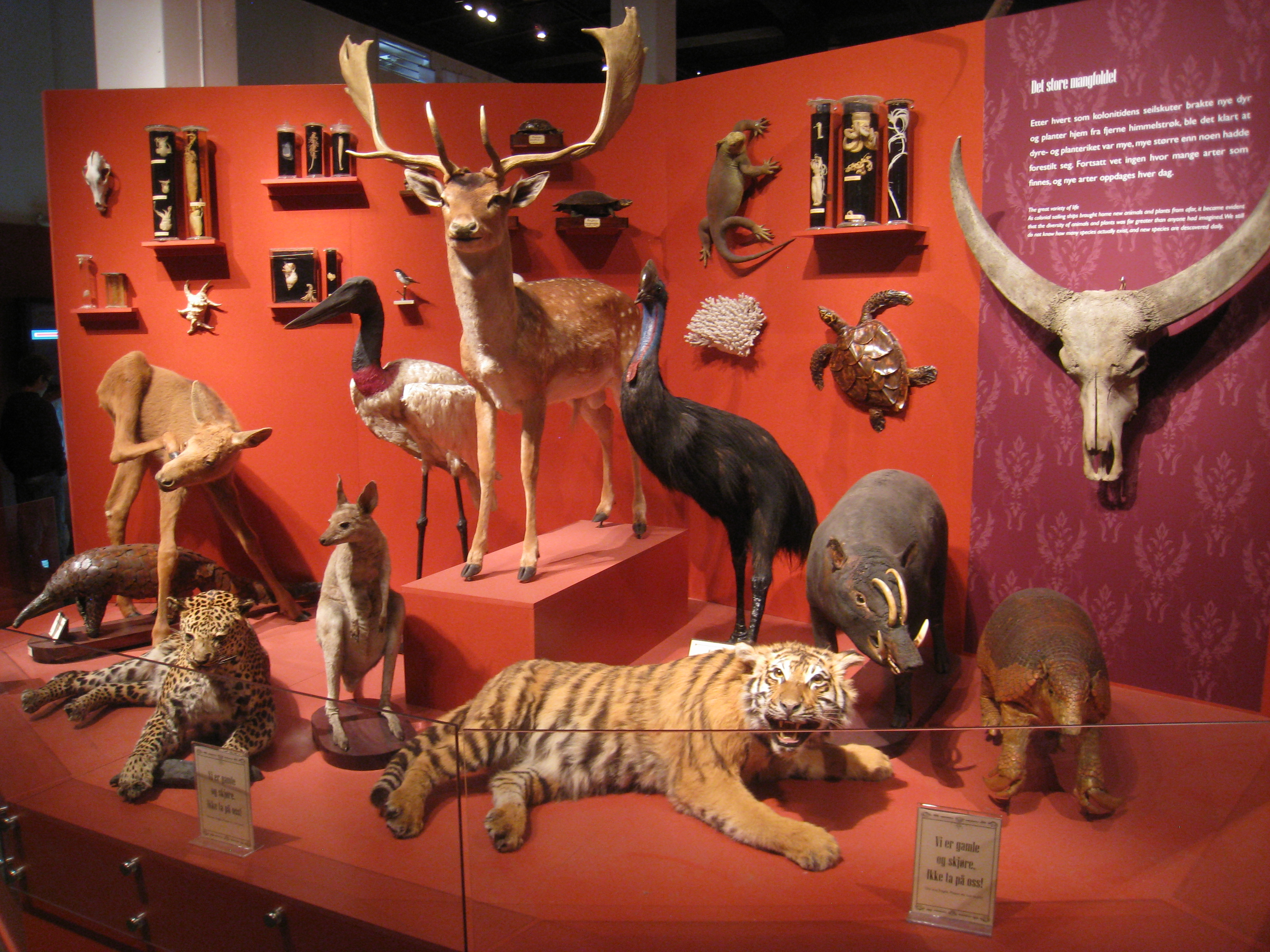
An array of zoological specimens at the Natural History Museum at the University of Oslo

A zoological specimen is an animal or part of an animal preserved for scientific use. Various uses are: to verify the identity of a (species), to allow study, increase public knowledge of zoology. Zoological specimens are extremely diverse. Examples are bird and mammal study skins, mounted specimens, skeletal material, casts, pinned insects, dried material, animals preserved in liquid preservatives, and microscope slides. Natural history museums are repositories of zoological specimens. The person who prepares zoological specimens is called (zoology) preparator.

== Study skins ==
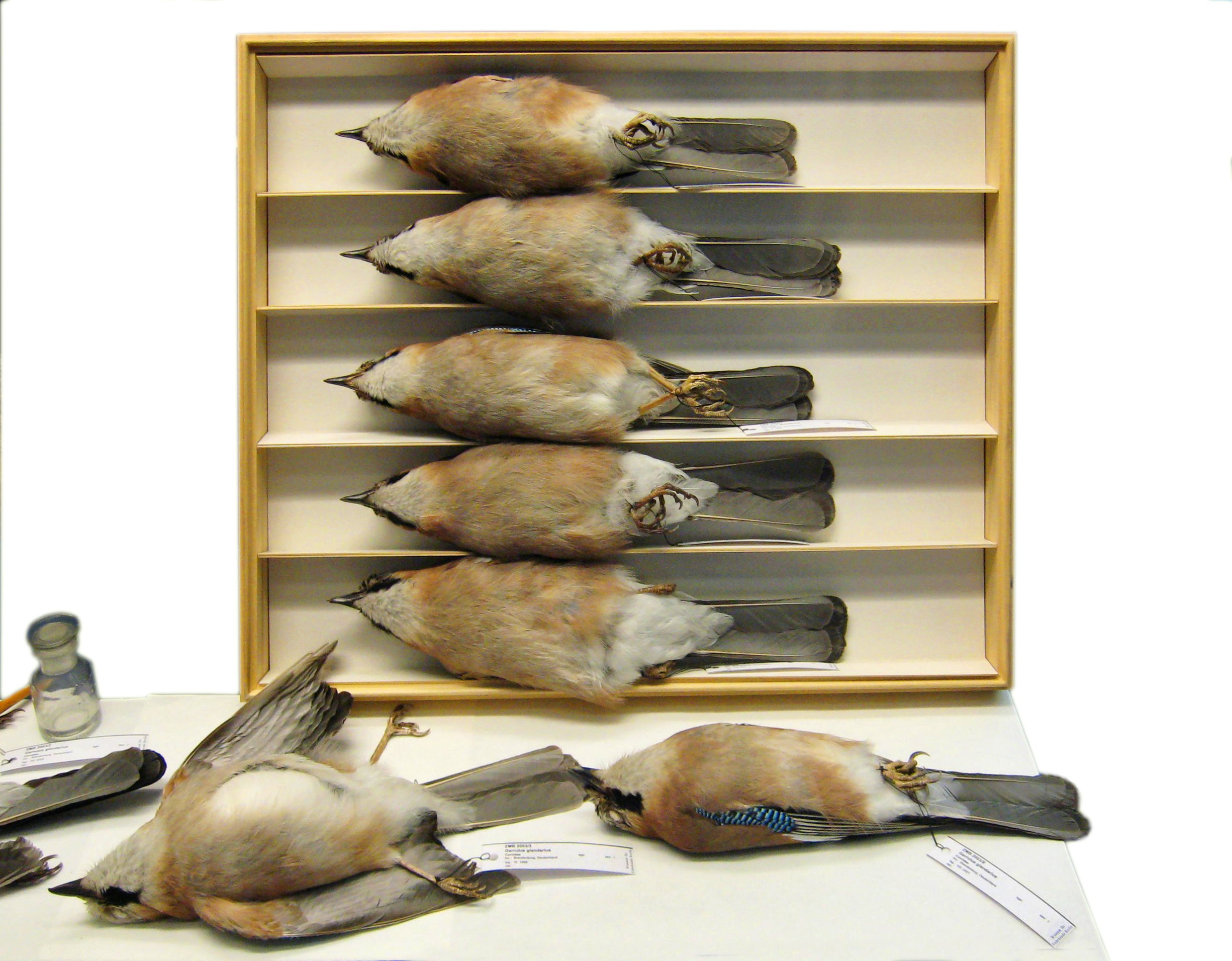
Study skins of Garrulus glandarius in Museum für Naturkunde, Berlin

Bird and mammal specimens are conserved as dry study skins, a form of taxidermy. The skin is removed from the animal's carcass, treated with absorbents, and filled with cotton or polyester batting (In the past plant fibres or sawdust were used). Bird specimens have a long, thin, wooden dowel wrapped in batting at their center. The dowel is often intentionally longer than the bird's body and exits at the animal's vent. This exposed dowel provides a place to handle the bird without disturbing the feathers. Mammal study skins do not normally utilize wooden dowels, instead preparators use wire to support the legs and tail of mammals. Labels are attached to a leg of the specimen with thread or string. Heat and chemicals are sometimes used to aid the drying of study skins.

== Skeletal preparations (osteology) ==
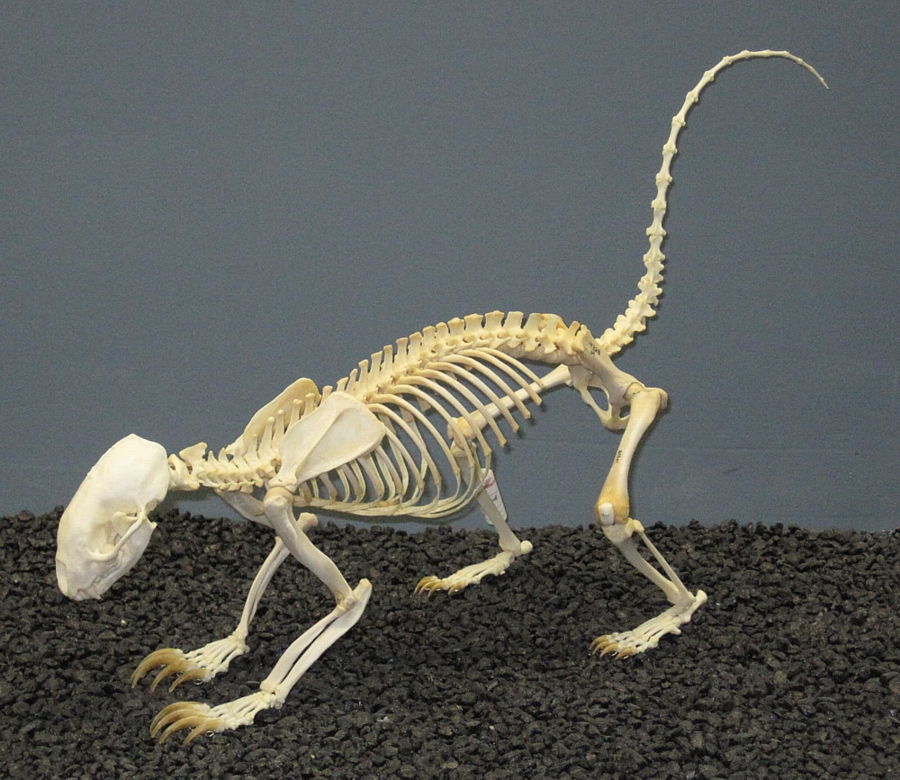
Hog-nosed skunk skeleton

Osteological collections consist of cleaned, complete and partial skeletons, crania of Vertebrates, mainly birds and mammals. They are used in studies of comparative anatomy and to identify bones from archaeological sites. Human bones are used in medical and forensic studies.

== Molluscs ==
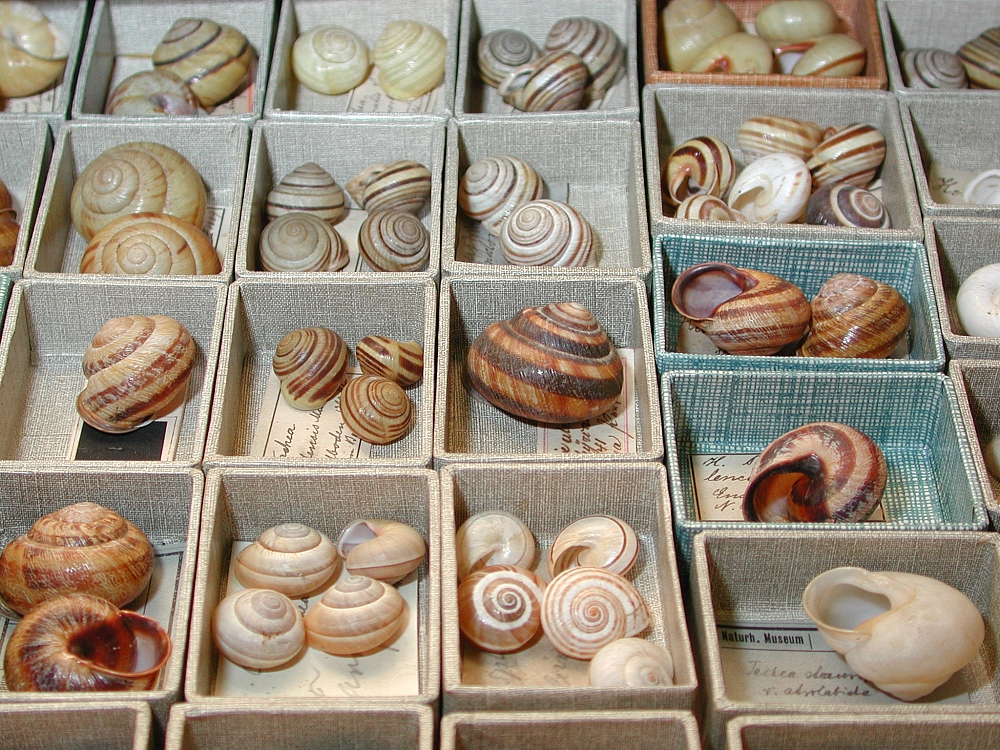
Dry specimens of Mollusca in Museum Wiesbaden

In museum collections it is common for the dry material to greatly exceed the amount of material that is preserved in alcohol. The shells minus their soft parts are kept in card trays within drawers or in glass tubes, often as lots (a lot is a collection of a single species taken from a single locality on a single occasion). Shell collections sometimes suffer from Byne's disease which also affects birds eggs. The study of dry mollusc shells is called conchology as distinct from malacology (wet specimens).

== Insects and similar invertebrates ==
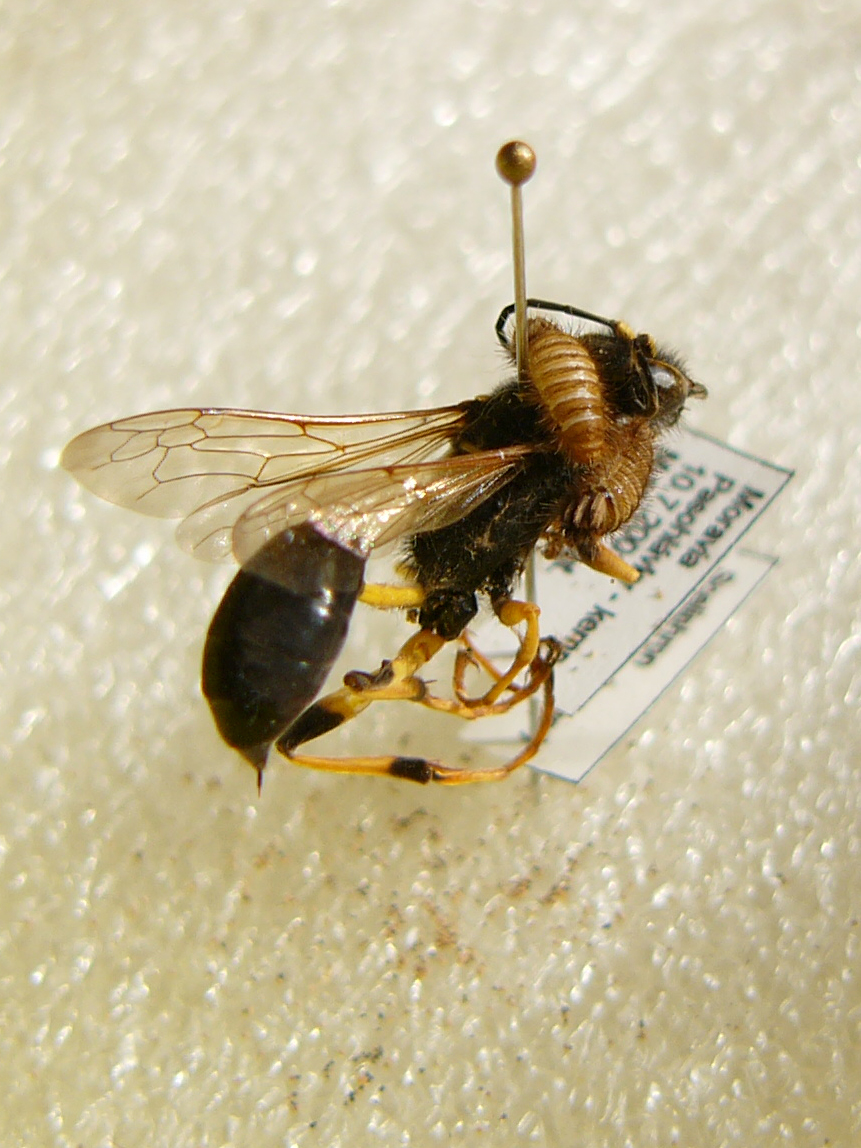
A pinned wasp. The dried insect is under attack from pests and this drawer will have to be frozen to contain the problem.

Most hard-bodied insect specimens and some other hard-bodied invertebrates such as certain Arachnida, are preserved as pinned specimens. Either while still fresh, or after rehydrating them if necessary because they had dried out, specimens are transfixed by special stainless steel entomological pins. As the insect dries the internal tissues solidify and, possibly aided to some extent by the integument, they grip the pin and secure the specimen in place on the pin. Very small, delicate specimens may instead be secured by fine steel points driven into slips of card, or glued to card points or similar attachments that in turn are pinned in the same way as entire mounted insects. The pins offer a means of handling the specimens without damage, and they also bear labels for descriptive and reference data.

Once dried, the specimens may be kept in conveniently sized open trays. The bottoms of the trays are lined with a material suited to receiving and holding entomological pins securely and conveniently. Cork and foam plastics are convenient examples. However, open trays are very vulnerable to attack by museum beetle and similar pests, so such open trays are stored in turn inside glass-topped, insect-proof drawers, commonly protected by suitable pesticides or repellents or barriers. Alternatively, some museums store the pinned specimens directly in larger trays or drawers that are glass-topped and stored in cabinets.

In contrast to such dried specimens, soft-bodied specimens most commonly are kept in "wet collections", meaning that they are stored in alcohol (most commonly 70% ethanol) or similar preservative or fixative liquids, according to the intended function.

Small specimens, whether hard or soft bodied, and whether entire, dissected, or sectioned, may be stored as microscope slide preparations.

== Wet specimens ==
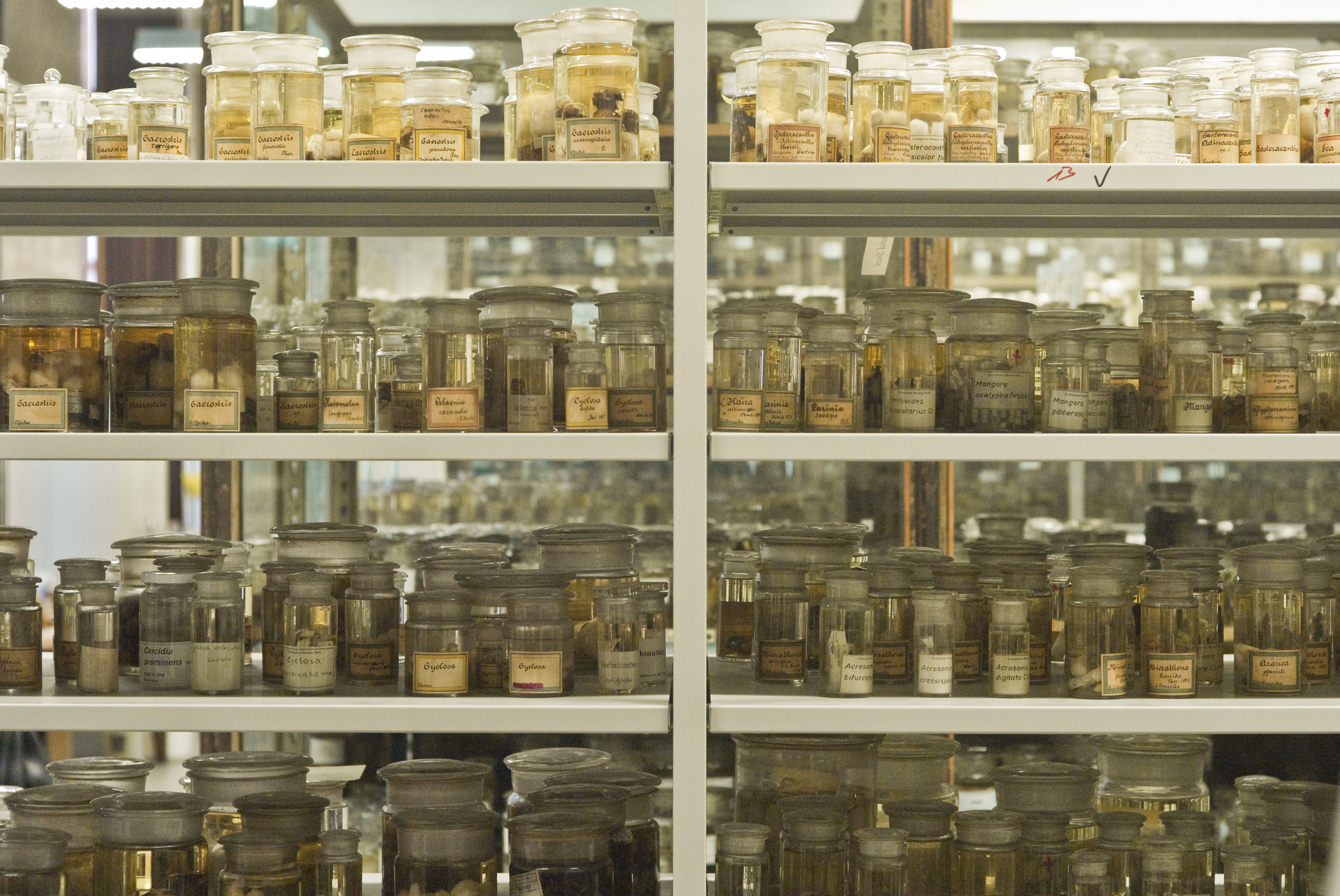
Collection of spiders preserved in alcohol (spirit collection)

"Wet" specimen collections are stored in different solutions. A very old method is to store the specimen in 70% ethanol with various additives after fixing with formalin or in these days sometimes with a salt-solution. Some methods are very useful, because the color can be preserved. (Salt-)Solutions like this are Jores, Kaiserling and Romhányi. Modern specimens are stored in borosilicate glass due to its chemical and thermal resistance and good optical clarity.

== Data ==
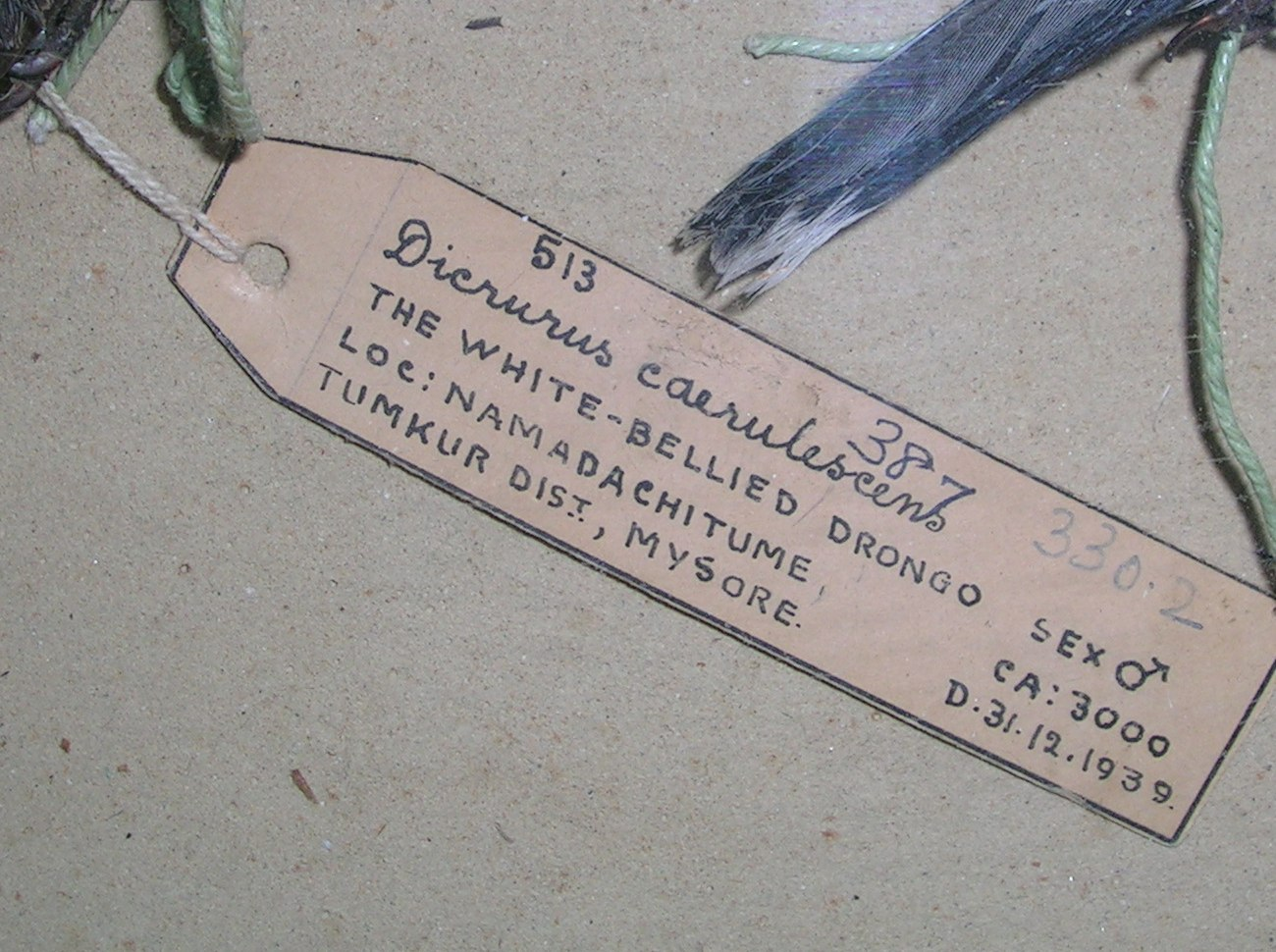
Label accompanying a bird skin. Note that the locality, date, identity of the specimen and collection catalogue numbers are given on the securely attached label.

Minimum data associated with zoological specimens is the place and date of collection, attached to the specimen by a label. Additional information is the name of the collector and the habitat. Tissue from specimens may be saved for genetic studies (molecular data, DNA). Depending on the animal group, other data may be included, for instance in bird collections the bird’s breeding condition, weight, colours of its eyes, bills and legs and nature of the stomach contents.

== Composite specimens ==
A single specimen may be a composite of preparations sharing a unique number. An example would be a vertebrate with an alcohol-preserved skin and viscera, a cleared and stained head, the post-cranial dried skeleton, histological, glass slides of various organs, and frozen tissue samples. This specimen could also be a voucher for a publication, or photographs and audiotape.

== Voucher specimens ==
A voucher is a representative specimen of the animal used in a study, such as a specimen collected as part of an ecological survey or a specimen which was the source of DNA for a molecular study. Voucher specimens confirm the identity of the species referred to in the study. They are a backup against misidentification, changing species concepts which mislead results. Type specimens are a special type of voucher specimen used in taxonomy.

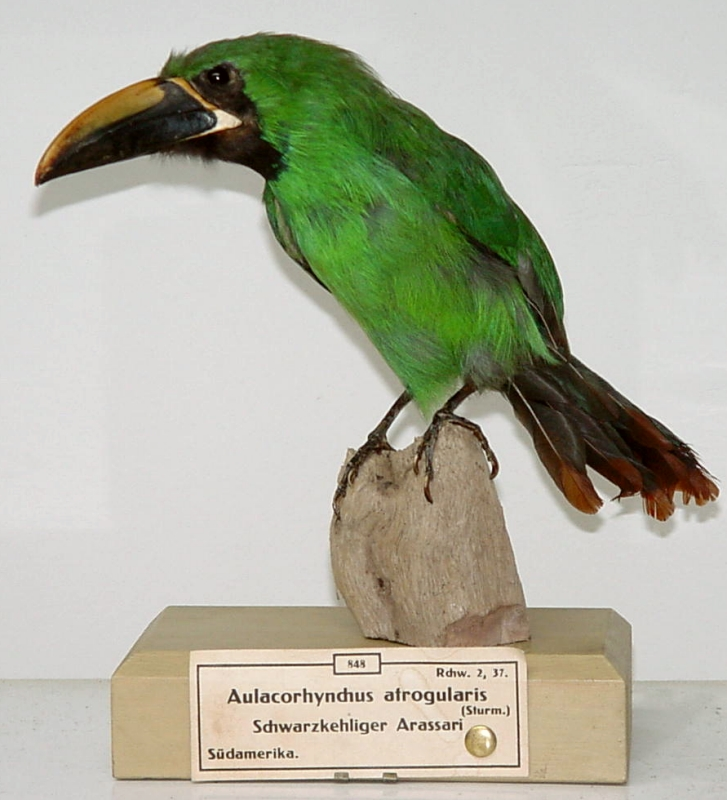
Mounted specimen of the Black-throated toucanet collected by Prince Maximilian of Wied-Neuwied and now in Naturhistorisches Museum Wien

== Historic specimens ==
Museum zoological specimens may have historic significance. For example, the specimens collected by Johann Baptist von Spix and Carl Friedrich Philipp von Martius during their Brazil Expedition (1817–1820) are housed in the Munich Zoology Museum.

== Models ==
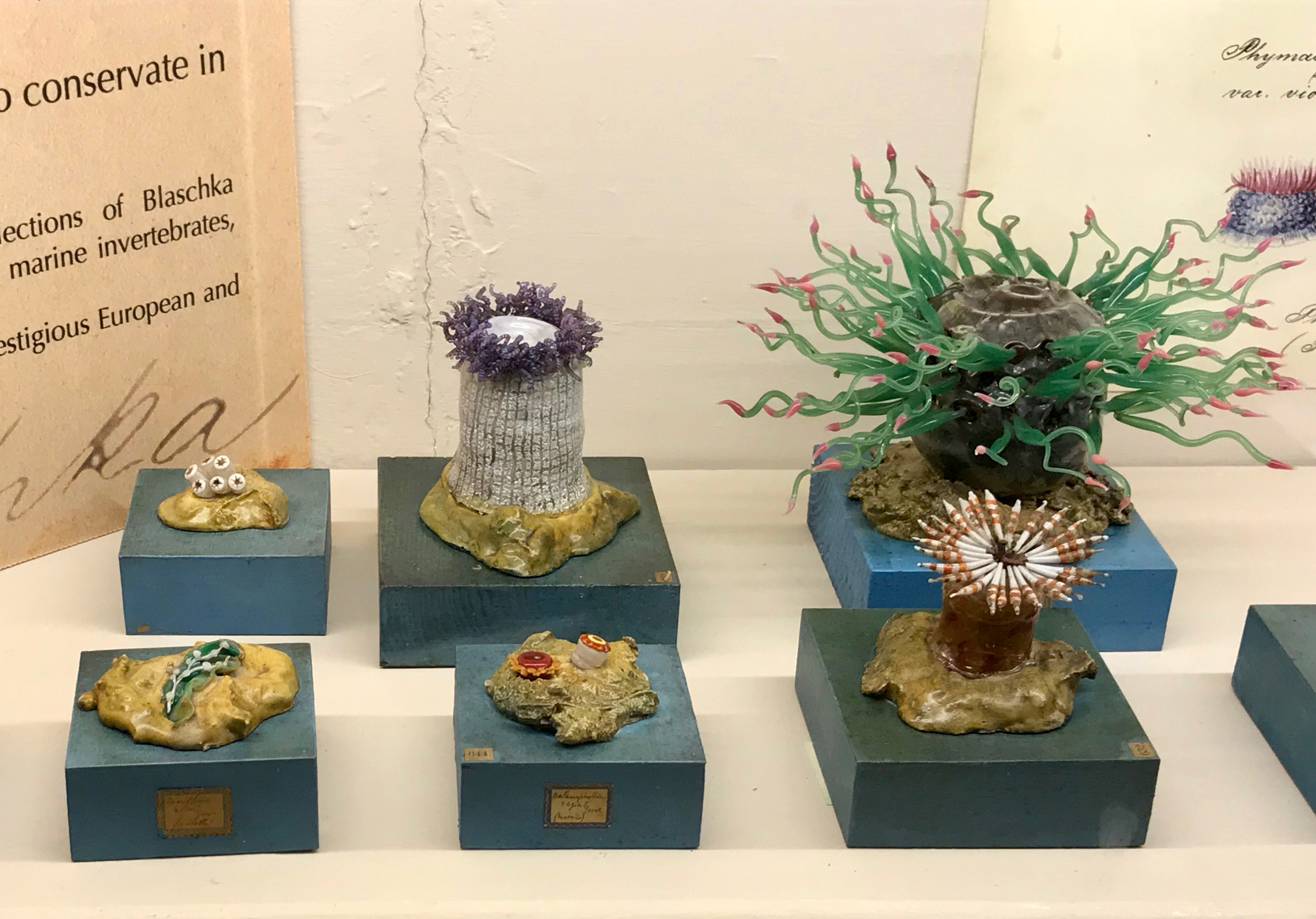
Glass models of Cnidaria by Leopold and Rudolf Blaschka.

Museums make extensive use of models. When these are accurate they are considered to be specimens in their own right. Examples are the glass invertebrates of Leopold and Rudolf Blaschka.

== Examples ==
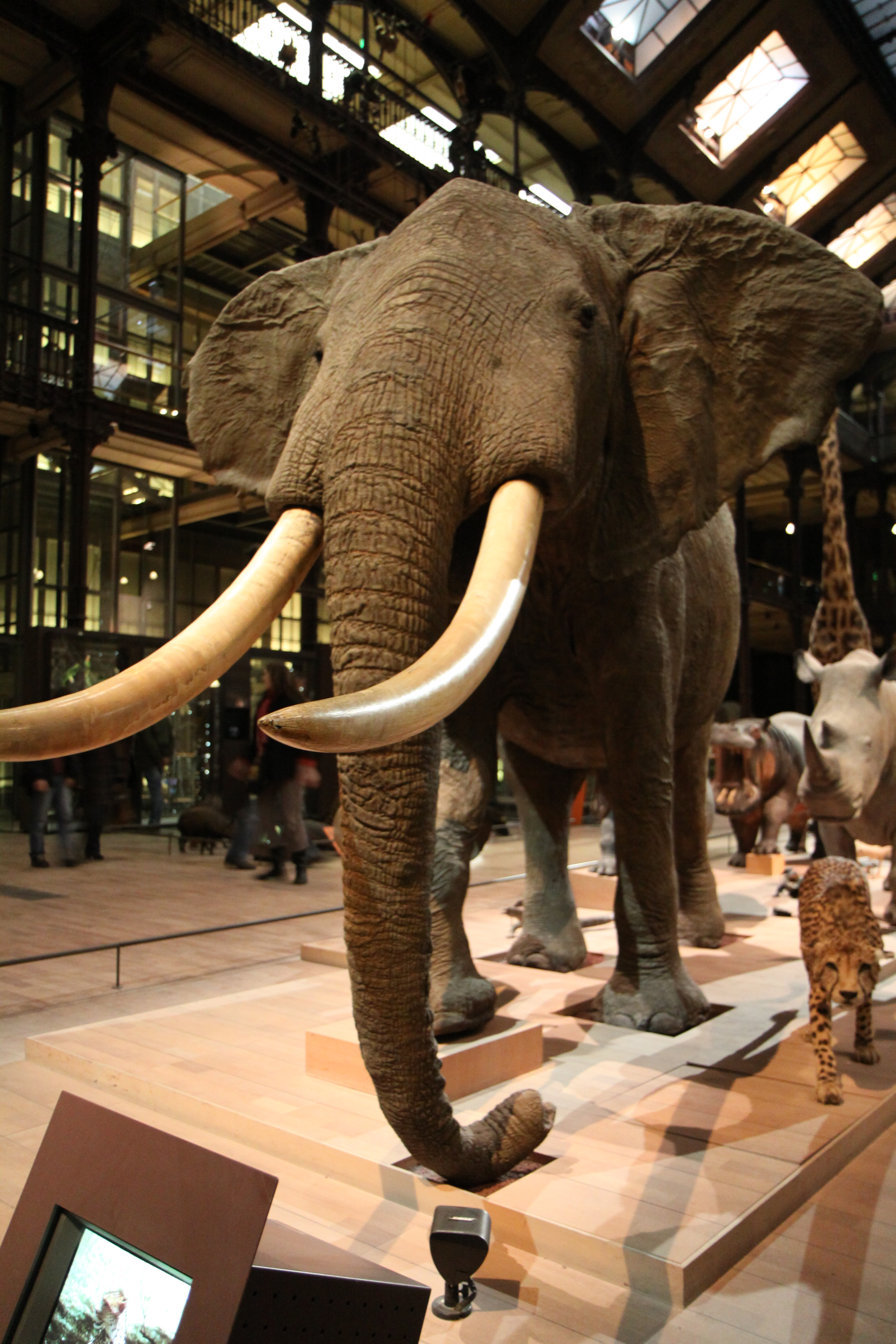
Mount of African elephant and other animals in Paris Museum

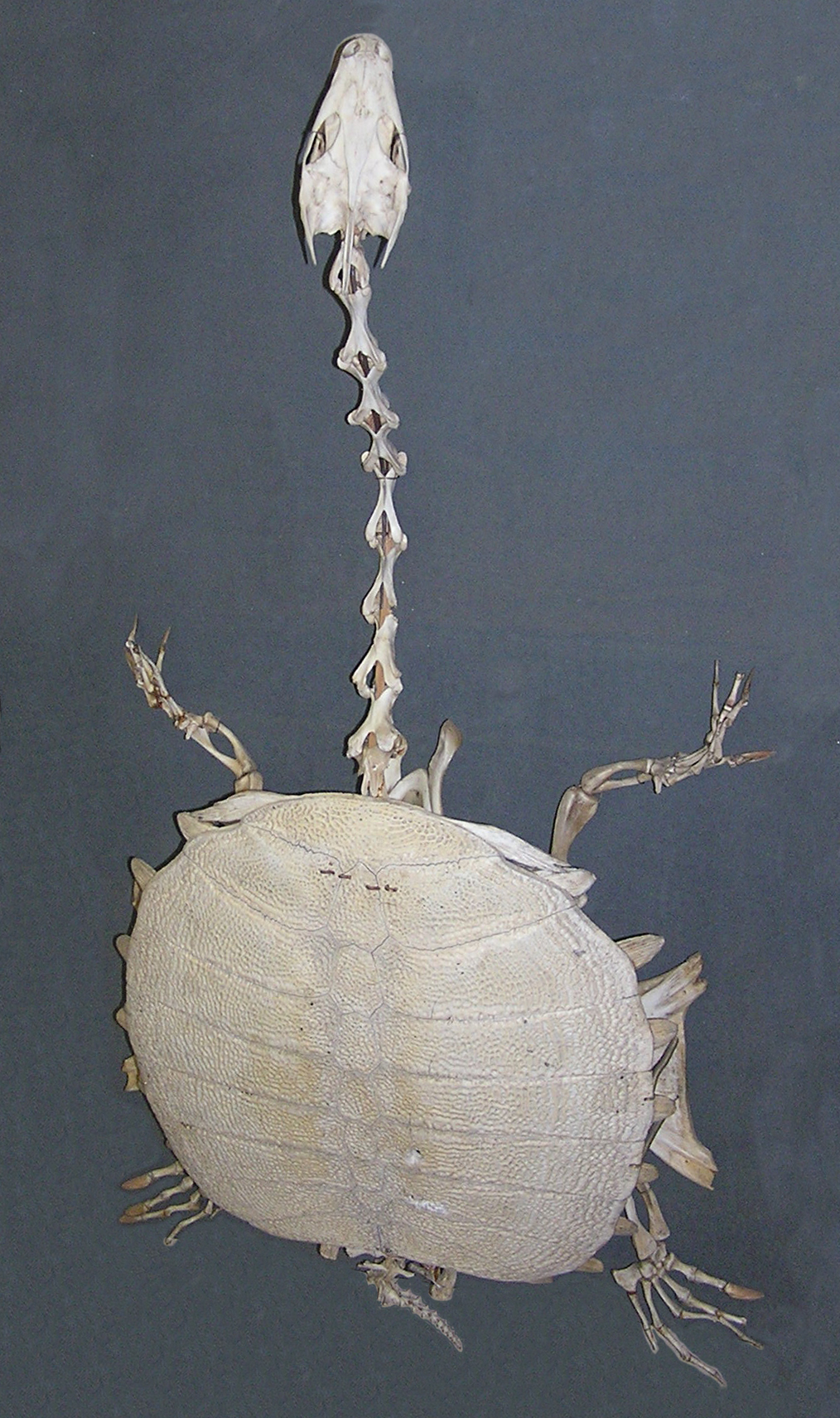
Chitra indica (narrow-headed soft-shelled turtle) skeleton

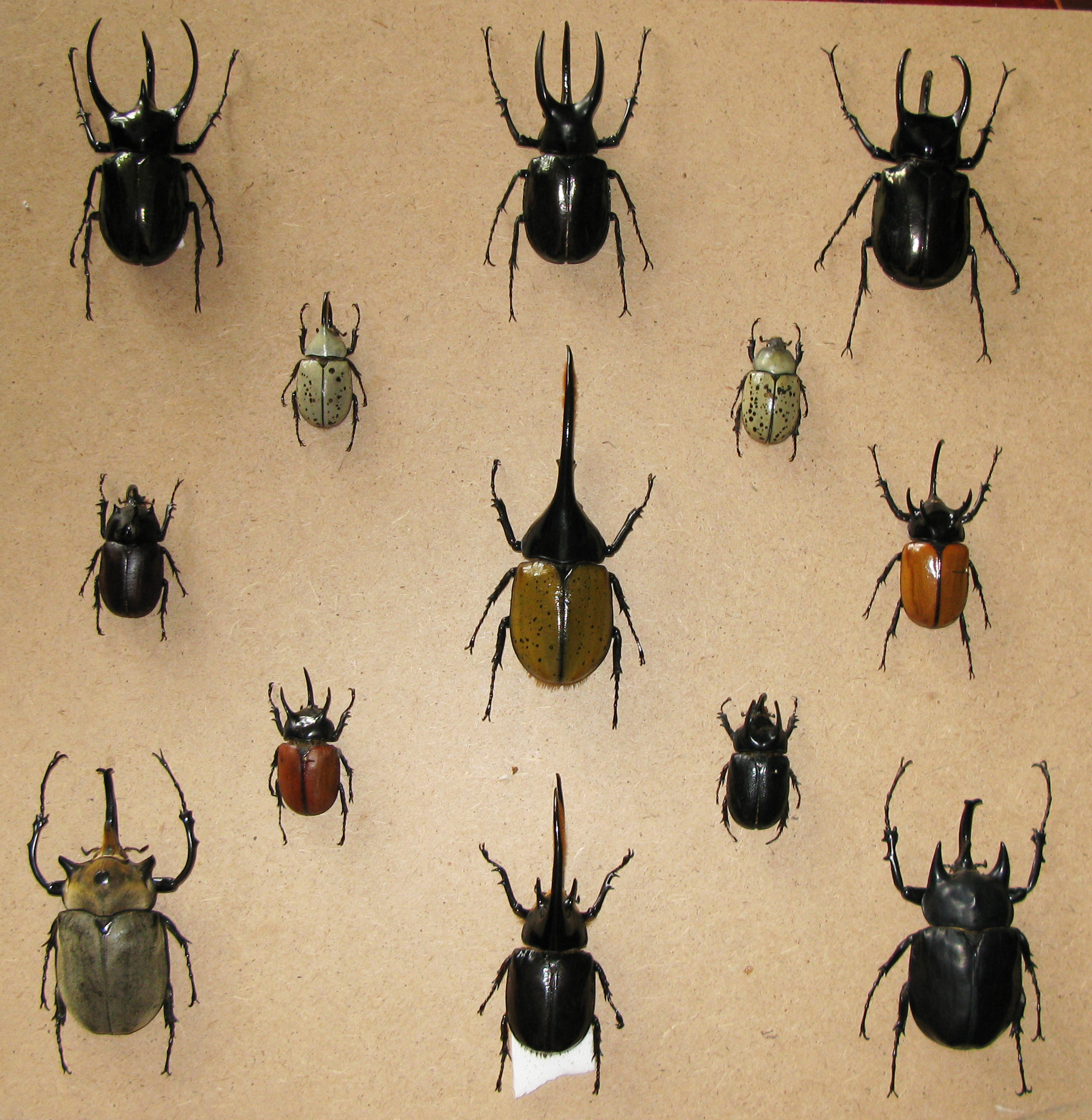
Pinned insects (Dynastinae)

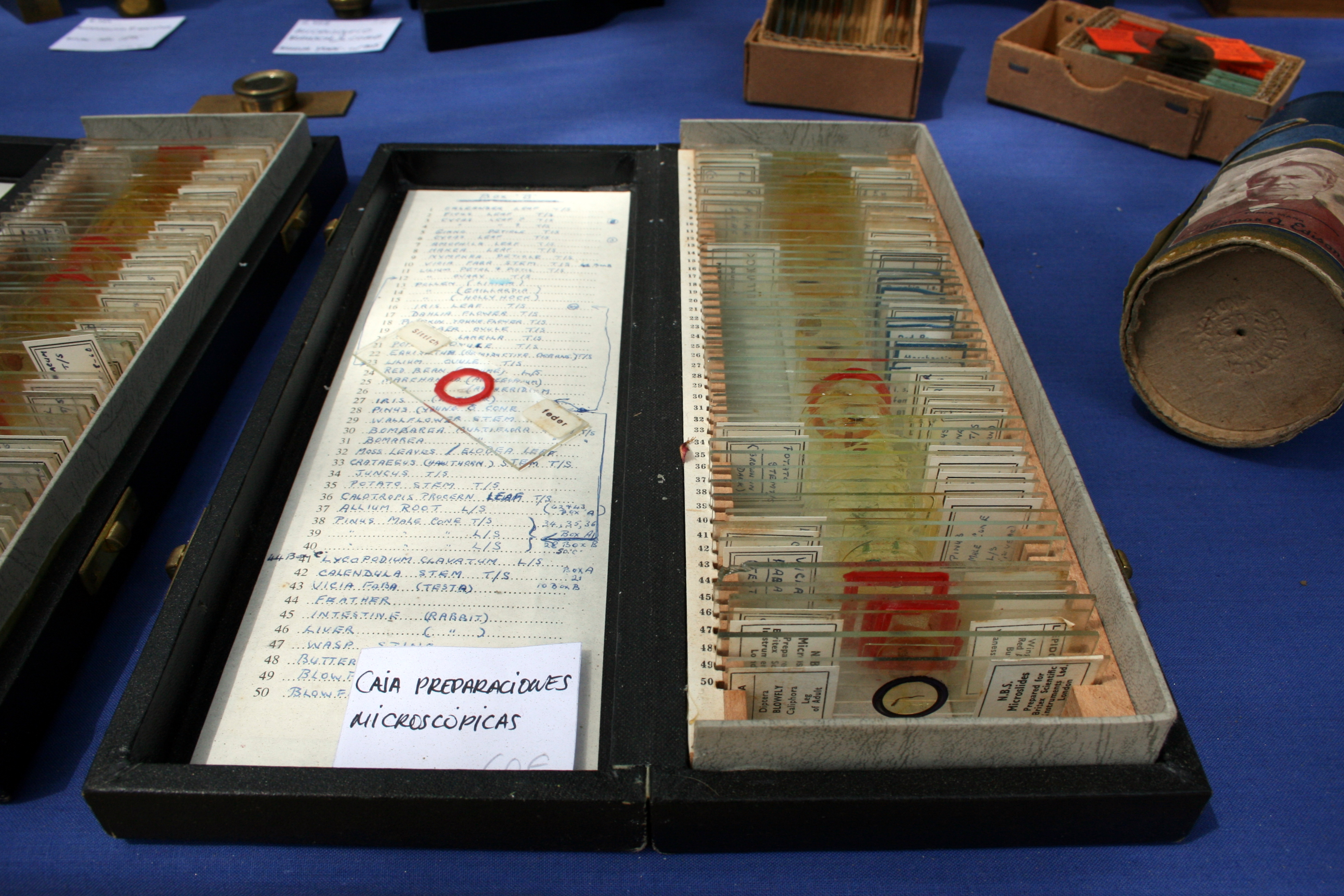
Microscope slides

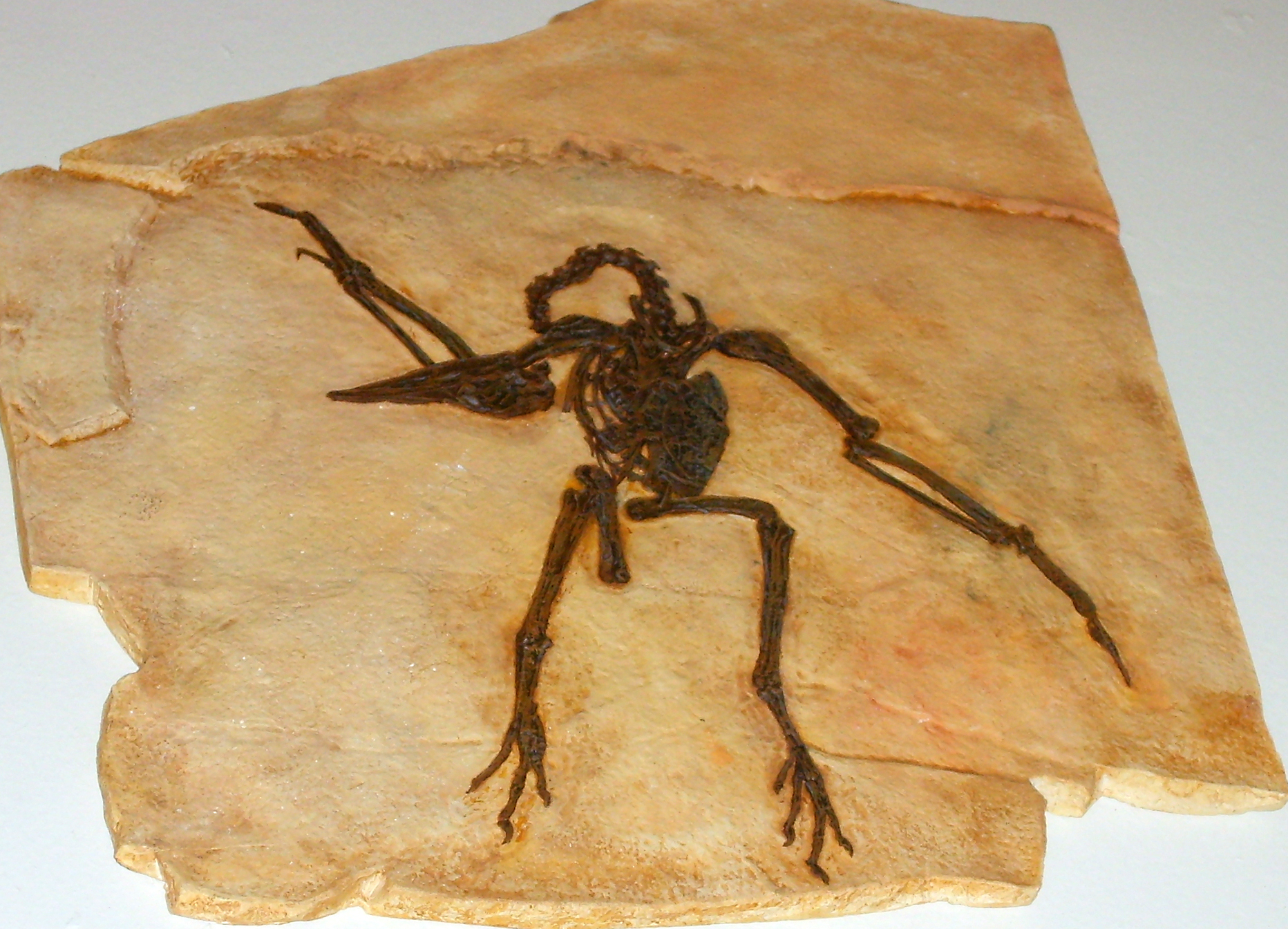
Cast of a bird fossil

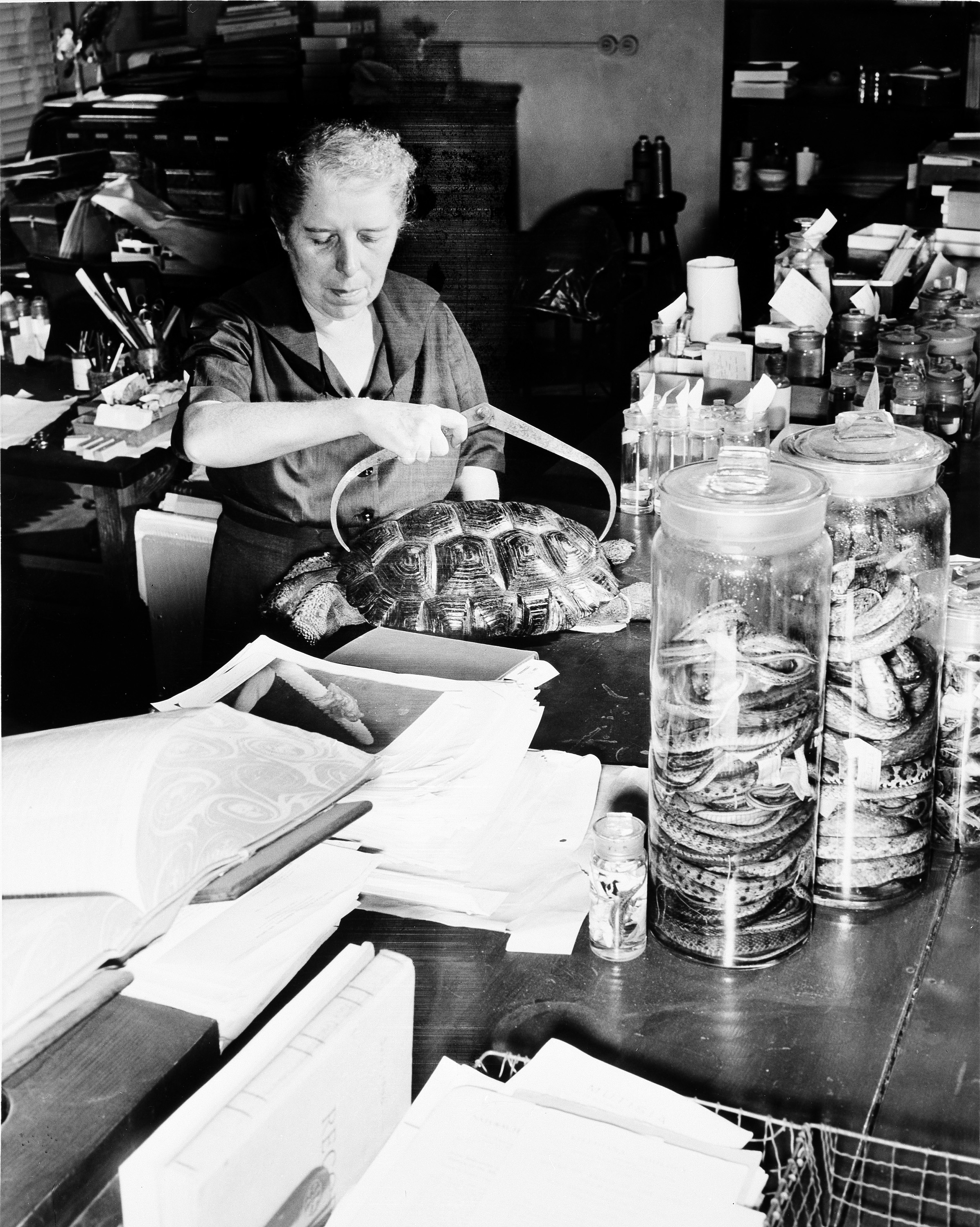
Zoologist measuring a turtle shell

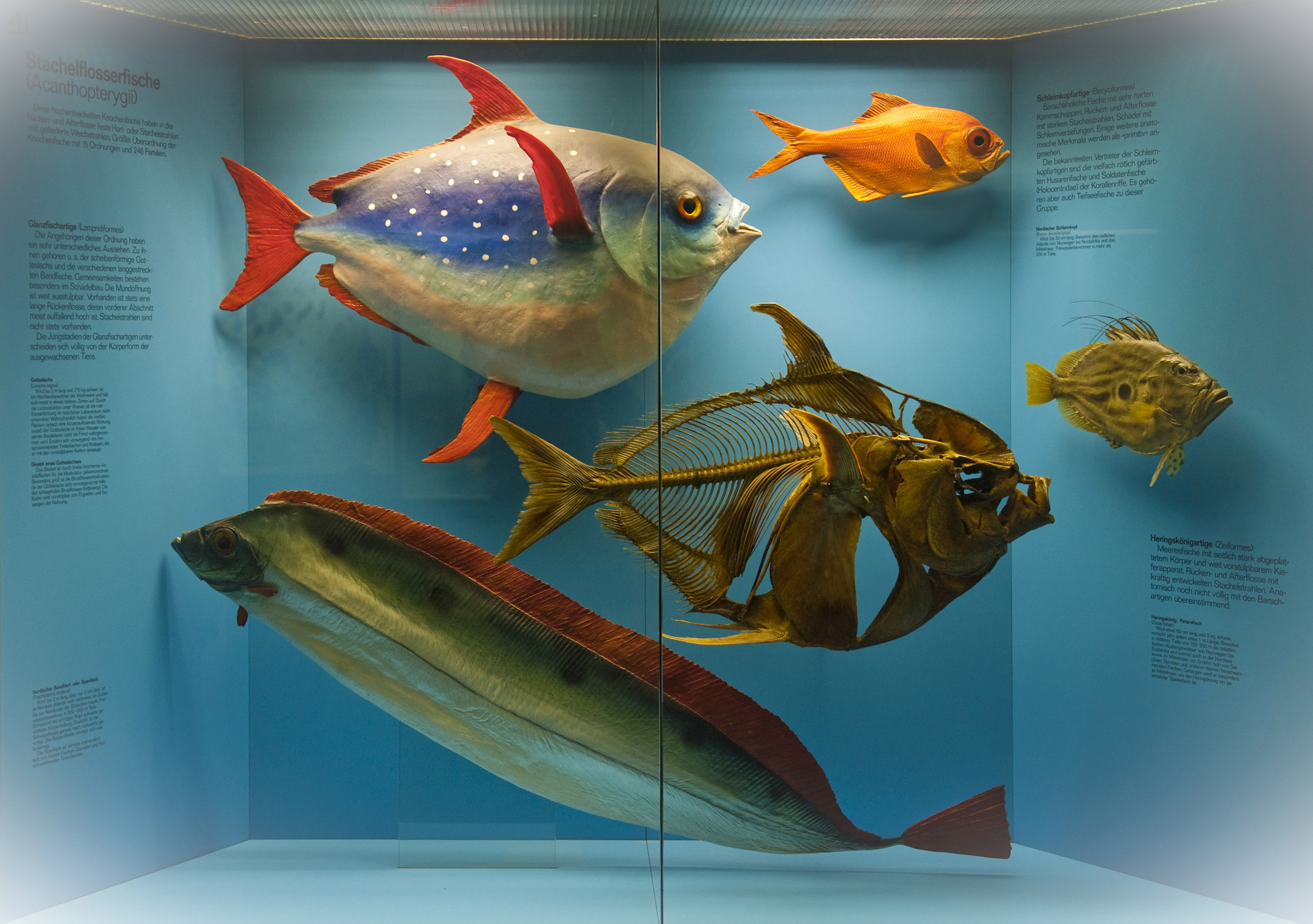
Acanthopterygii (fish) at Naturmuseum Senckenberg

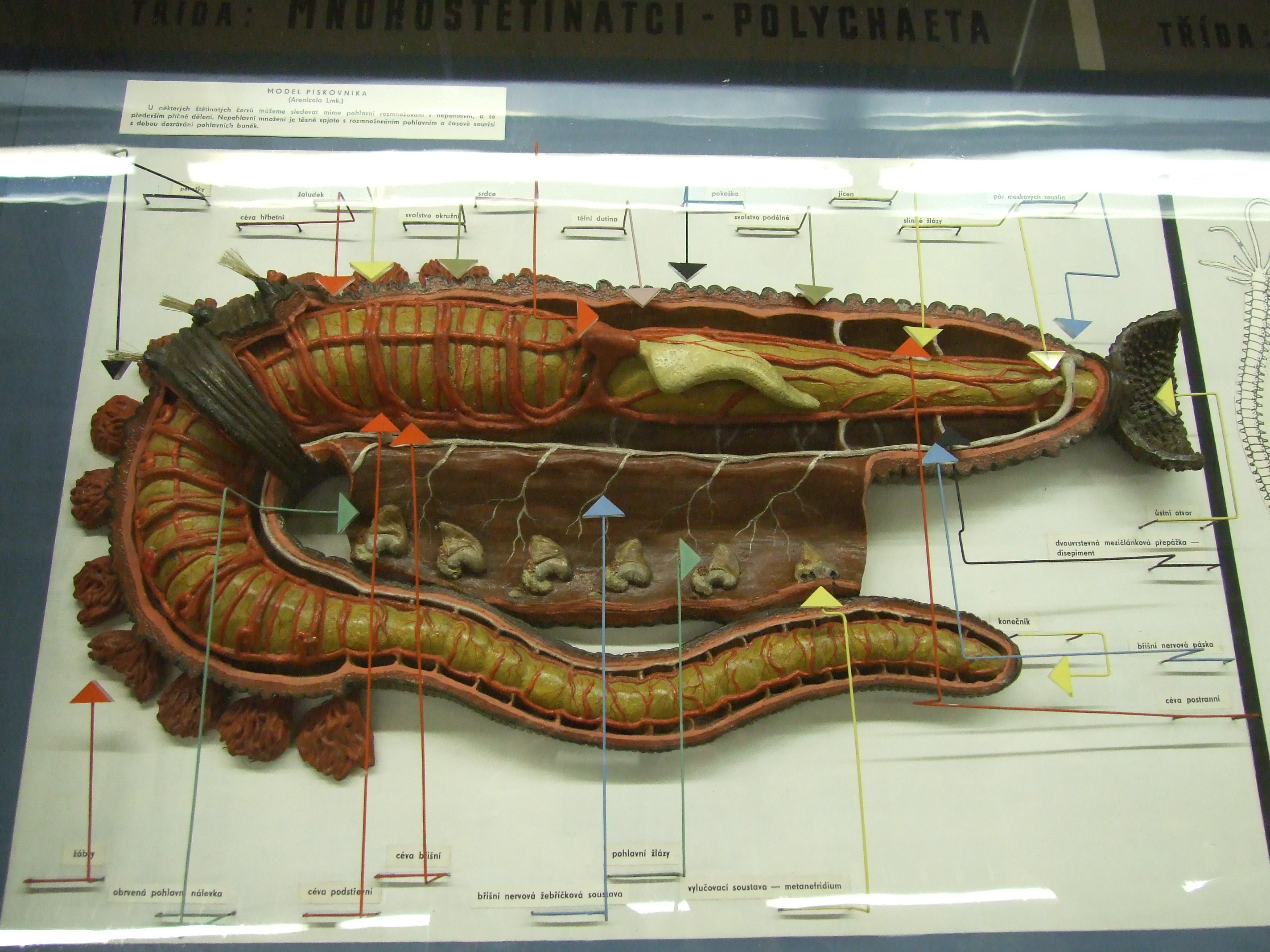
Model of Arenicola marina in a zoological exhibition at National Museum (Prague)

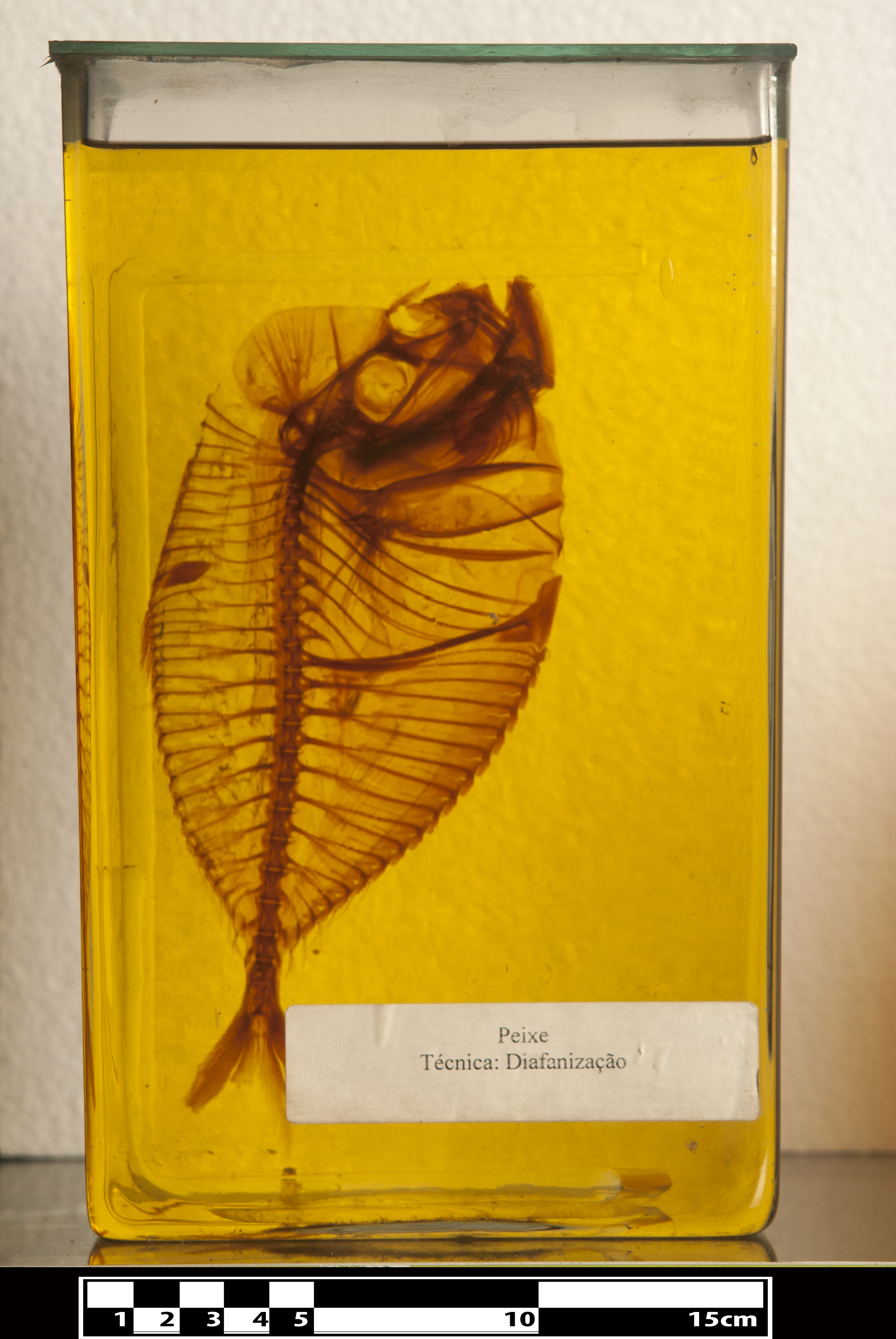
Specimen of fish clarified for visualization of anatomical structures on display at the MAV/USP.

== See also ==
- Biological specimen
- Bird collections
- Botanical specimen
- Cryopreservation
- Insect collecting
- Laboratory specimen
- Plant collecting
- Seed bank
- Type specimen

== See also ==
- List of natural history dealers
