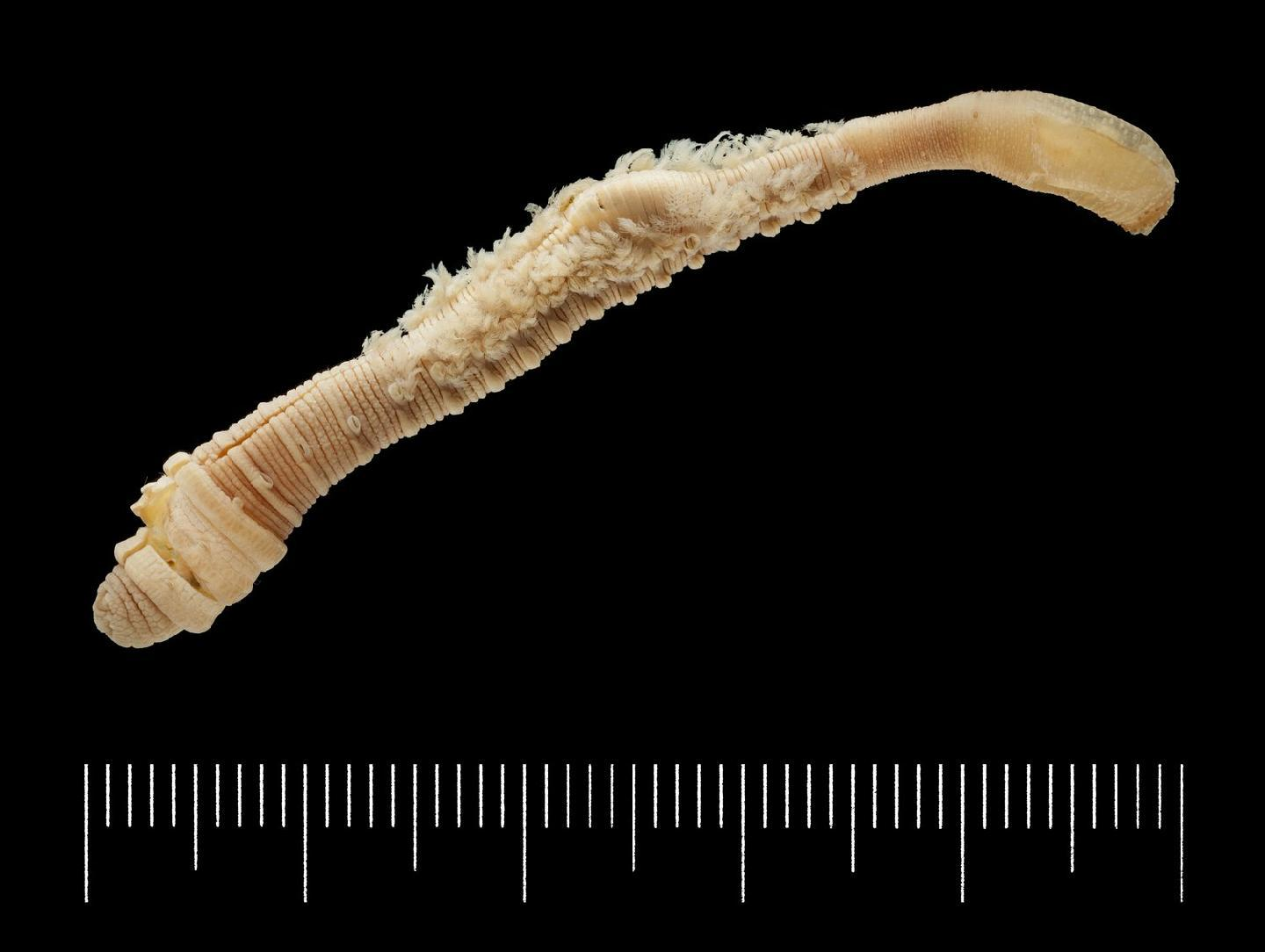
- Holotype of Abarenicola affinis africana, a subspecies of A. affinis.

Scientific classification
- Kingdom: Animalia
- Phylum: Annelida
- Clade: Pleistoannelida
- Clade: Sedentaria
- Clade: Maldanomorpha
- Family: Arenicolidae
- Genus: Abarenicola
- Species: A. affinis

Binomial name
- Abarenicola affinis (Ashworth, 1903)

= Abarenicola affinis =

Species of bristle worm

Abarenicola affinis is a species of polychaetes belonging to the family Arenicolidae.

This species is found in Southern Hemisphere. They typically live in soft sediments and are filter-feeders.

Four subspecies of Abarenicola affinis are described:

- Abarenicola affinis affinis (Ashworth, 1902)- nominate subspecies
- Abarenicola affinis africana Wells, 1963
- Abarenicola affinis chilensis Wells, 1963
- Abarenicola affinis clarki Wells, 1963
