= Rhodininae =

Scientific classification
- Domain: Eukaryota
- Kingdom: Animalia
- Phylum: Annelida
- Clade: Pleistoannelida
- Clade: Sedentaria
- Clade: Maldanomorpha
- Family: Maldanidae
- Subfamily: Rhodininae; Arwidsson 1906

Genera
- Rhodine; Boguea; Boguella

Subfamily of marine worms

Rhodininae is a subfamily of marine polychaete worms in the family Maldanidae.

== Description ==
Rhodininae worms are characterized by a lack of cephalic and pygidial plates, the presence of posteriorly directed collars in the posterior chaetigerous segments in at least one genus, a short low keel formed by the prostomium, acicular spines in notochaetae, absence of neurochaetae in a number of anterior chaetigers, presence of a double row of terebelloid uncini on some chaetigers, subrostral (i.e. below the rostrum) processes without barbules, an indeterminate number of chaetigers, and a conical pygidium.

== Classification ==
The subfamily contains 3 genera and 10 species.

- Rhodine Malmgren 1865 – 7 species
- Boguea Hartman 1945 – 2 species
- Boguella Hartman & Fauchald 1971 – 1 species
