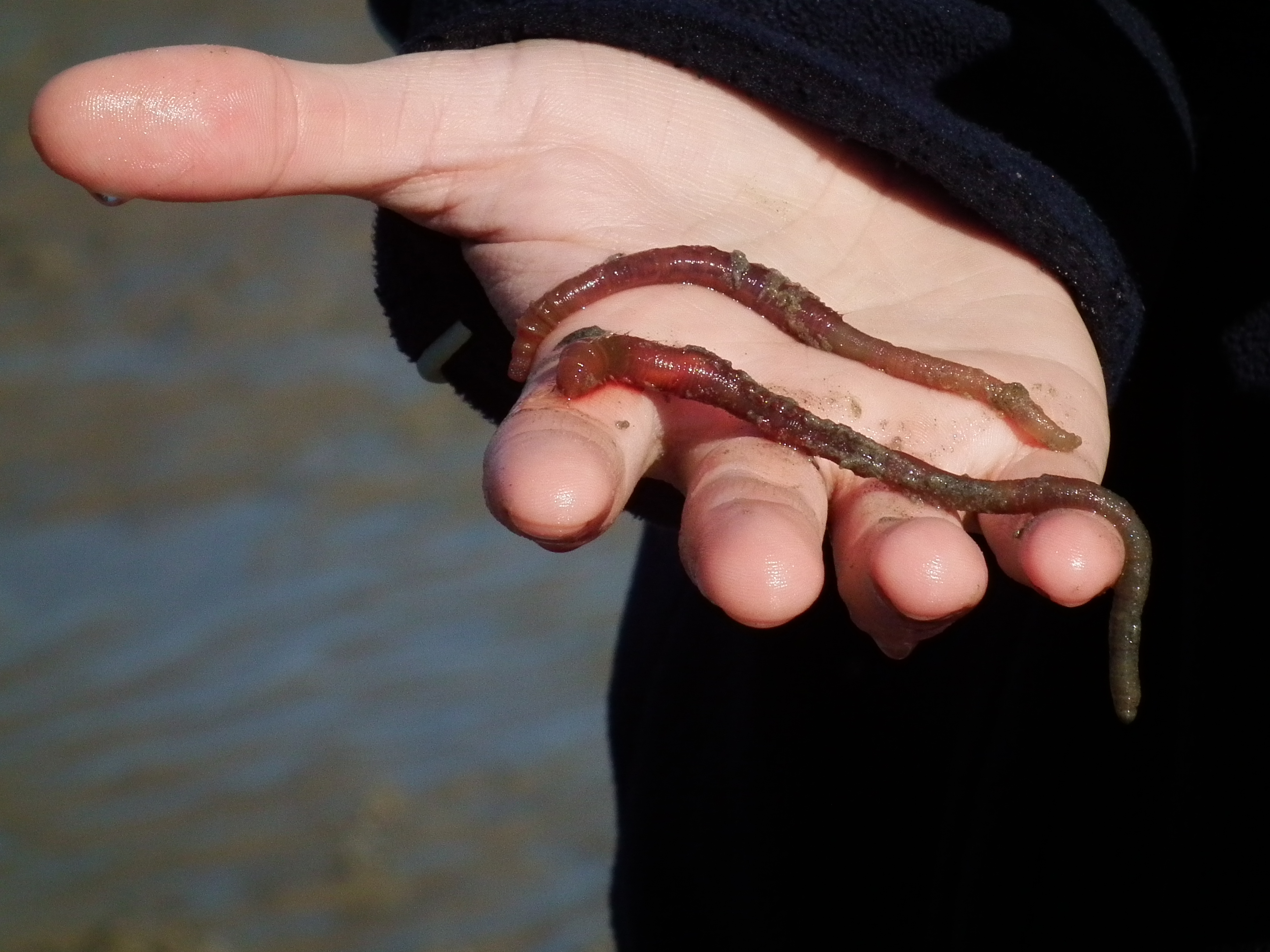
- Lugworm, Arenicola marina

Scientific classification
- Kingdom: Animalia
- Phylum: Annelida
- Clade: Pleistoannelida
- Clade: Sedentaria
- Clade: Maldanomorpha
- Family: Arenicolidae
- Genus: Arenicola

Synonyms
- Chorizobranchus Quatrefages, 1866; Clymenides Claparède, 1863

= Arenicola =

Genus of annelids

Arenicola, also known as sandworms, is a genus of capitellid annelid worms comprising the lugworms and black lugs.

A.cristata is the dominant warm-water lugworm on the shores of North America and Humboldt Bay, California. A. caroledna dominates in China and Japan while Arenicola marina is mostly found in Europe, up to Norway. Arenicola loveni is restricted to Southern Africa.

== Species ==
The following species are recognised in the genus Arenicola:

- Arenicola bombayensis Kewalramani et al
- Arenicola brasiliensis Nonato, 1958
- Arenicola caroledna Wells
- Arenicola cristata Stimpson, 1856
- Arenicola defodiens Cadman & Nelson-Smith, 1993
- Arenicola glasselli Berkeley & Berkeley, 1939
- Arenicola loveni Kinberg, 1866
- Arenicola marina (Linnaeus, 1758)

== Life in a burrow ==
Simplified cross-section of a lugworm burrow

A lugworm lives in a U-shaped burrow in sand. The U is made of an L-shaped gallery lined with mucus, from the toe of which a vertical unlined shaft runs up to the surface. This is a head shaft. At the surface the head shaft is marked by a small saucer-shaped depression. The tail shaft, 2 to 3 in (5.1 to 7.6 cm) from it, is marked by a highly coiled cast of sand. The lugworm lies in this burrow with its head at the base of the head shaft, swallowing sand from time to time. This makes the columns of sand drop slightly, so there is a periodic sinking of the sand in the saucer-shaped depression. When it first digs its burrow the lugworm softens the sand in its head shaft by pushing its head up into it with a piston action. After that the sand is kept loose by a current of water driven through the burrow from the hind end by the waves of contraction passing along the worm's body.

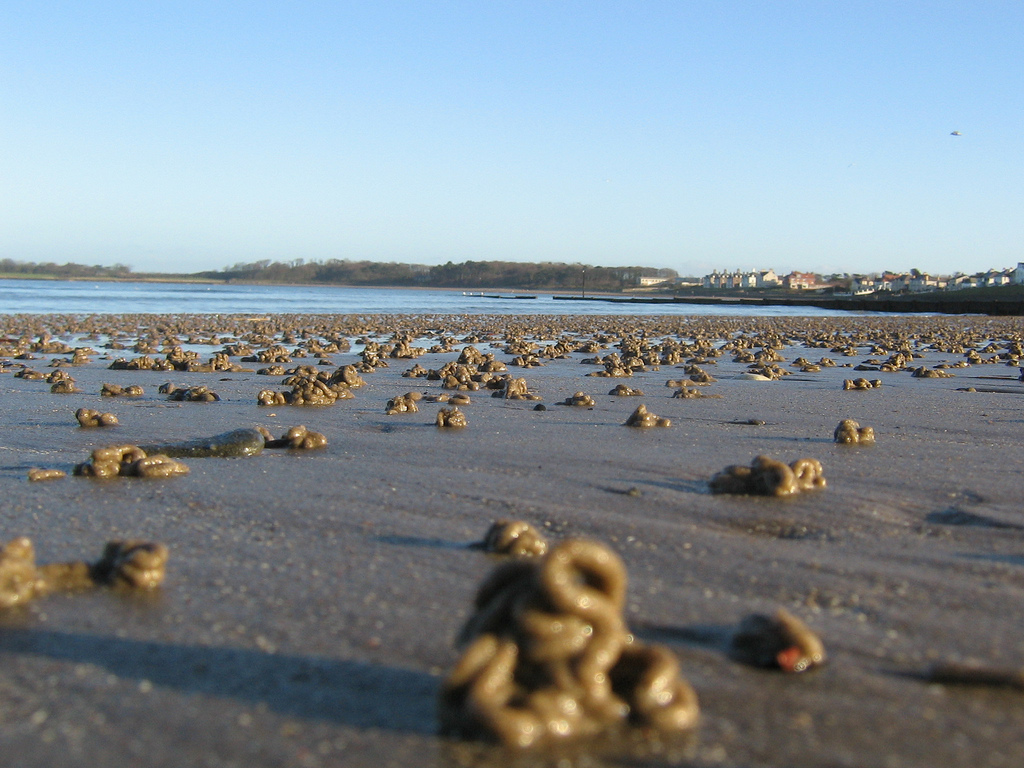
Lugworms are not typically visible, but the casts produced by their burrowing make distinctive patterns in damp sand

== Reproduction ==
Once it burrows into the sand a lugworm seldom leaves it. It can stay there for weeks on end, sometimes changing its position slightly in the sand. But it may leave the burrow completely and re-enter the sand, making a fresh burrow for breeding but for 2 days in early October there is a mass breeding event. This is when all the lugworms liberate their ova and sperms into the water above, and there the ova are fertilized. The ova are enclosed in tongue-shaped masses of jelly about 8 inches long, 3 inches wide and 1 inch thick. Each mass is anchored at one end. The larvae hatching from the eggs feed on the jelly and eventually break out when they have grown to a dozen segments and are beginning to resemble their parents. They burrow into the sand, usually higher up the beach than the adults, and gradually move down the beach as they get older.

== In popular culture ==
A singing lugworm figures in The Man Who Dreamed of Faeryland by William Butler Yeats:

But while he passed before a plashy place,
A lug-worm with its grey and muddy mouth
Sang that somewhere to north or west or south
There dwelt a gay, exulting, gentle race
Under the golden or the silver skies

— W.B. Yeats

Cartoonist Piers Baker created a syndicated comic strip called Ollie and Quentin, with a buddy storyline about Ollie, a seagull and Quentin, a lugworm. The strip originated in the UK in 2002, with King Features Syndicate introducing it to international syndication in early 2008. Baker considers the strip "an homage to all the poor lugworms that he used as bait while sea fishing in his youth."
