= Rhodine =

Scientific classification
- Kingdom: Animalia
- Phylum: Annelida
- Clade: Pleistoannelida
- Clade: Sedentaria
- Clade: Maldanomorpha
- Family: Maldanidae
- Subfamily: Rhodininae
- Genus: Rhodine; Malmgren 1866

Type species
- Rhodine loveni

Species
- Rhodine antarctica; Rhodine attenuata; Rhodine bitorquata; Rhodine gracilior; Rhodine antarctica; Rhodine intermedia; Rhodine loveni; Rhodine sima

Genus of polychaete worm

Rhodine is a genus of capitellid segmented worms in the family Maldanidae.

== Morphology ==
Rhodine worms have a head with a transverse ridge on the posterior part of their peristomium; their neurochaetae begin on the fifth chaetiger (i.e. any segment with chaetae); they present double rows of uncini in median and posterior chaetigers; they have an indeterminate number of chaetigers; and their posterior segments have posteriorly directed collars.
