= Lumbriclymeninae =

Scientific classification
- Domain: Eukaryota
- Kingdom: Animalia
- Phylum: Annelida
- Clade: Pleistoannelida
- Clade: Sedentaria
- Clade: Maldanomorpha
- Family: Maldanidae
- Subfamily: Lumbriclymeninae; Arwidsson 1906

Genera
- Lumbriclymene; Lumbriclymenella; Clymenopsis; Praxillura

Subfamily of marine worms

Lumbriclymeninae is a subfamily of marine polychaete worms in the family Maldanidae.

== Description ==
Rhodininae worms are characterized by a lack of cephalic and pygidial plates, a keel formed by the prostomium, short and curved nuchal groves, a variety of notochaetae forms, anterior neurochaetae shaped as acicular spines in the anterior chaetigers (i.e. segments with chaetae) and as rostrate uncini in posterior chaetigers, a long and conical pygidium with many transversal striae, and dark circular rings.

== Classification ==
The subfamily contains 4 genera and 22 species.

- Lumbriclymene Sars 1872 – 10 species
- Lumbriclymenella Arwidsson 1906 – 2 species
- Clymenopsis Verrill 1900 – 4 species
- Praxillura Verrill 1880 – 6 species
