= Euclymene =

Maldanidae

Scientific classification
- Domain: Eukaryota
- Kingdom: Animalia
- Phylum: Annelida
- Clade: Pleistoannelida
- Clade: Sedentaria
- Clade: Maldanomorpha
- Family: Maldanidae
- Subfamily: Euclymeninae; Malmgren, 1867
- Genus: Euclymene; Verrill, 1900

Genus of polychaete bamboo worms

Euclymene is a genus of polychaete bamboo worms in the family Maldanidae, first described by Addison Emery Verrill in 1900. The type species is Clymene amphistoma Lamarck, 1818, currently accepted as Euclymene amphistoma (Lamarck, 1818). The species Euclymene amphistoma (Lamarck, 1818) is now unused because Verrill incorrectly changed the Euclymene type species to Clymene oerstedii

== Species ==
As of October 2023, the following species are accepted:

- Euclymene annandalei Southern, 1921
- Euclymene aucklandica Augener, 1923
- Euclymene collaris (Claparède, 1869)
- Euclymene corallicola (Treadwell, 1929)
- Euclymene coronata Verrill, 1900
- Euclymene delineata Moore, 1923
- Euclymene dispar (Verrill, 1873)
- Euclymene droebachiensis (Sars, 1872)
- Euclymene insecta (Ehlers, 1904)
- Euclymene lindrothi Eliason, 1962
- Euclymene lombricoides (Quatrefages, 1866)
- Euclymene luderitziana Augener, 1918
- Euclymene mossambica (Day, 1957)
- Euclymene natalensis (Day, 1957)
- Euclymene oerstedii (Claparède, 1863)
- Euclymene palermitana (Grube, 1840)
- Euclymene papillata (Berkeley & Berkeley, 1939)
- Euclymene trinalis Hutchings, 1974
- Euclymene uncinata Imajima & Shiraki, 1982
- Euclymene vidali De Assis, De Souza, Fitzhugh & Christoffersen, 2022
