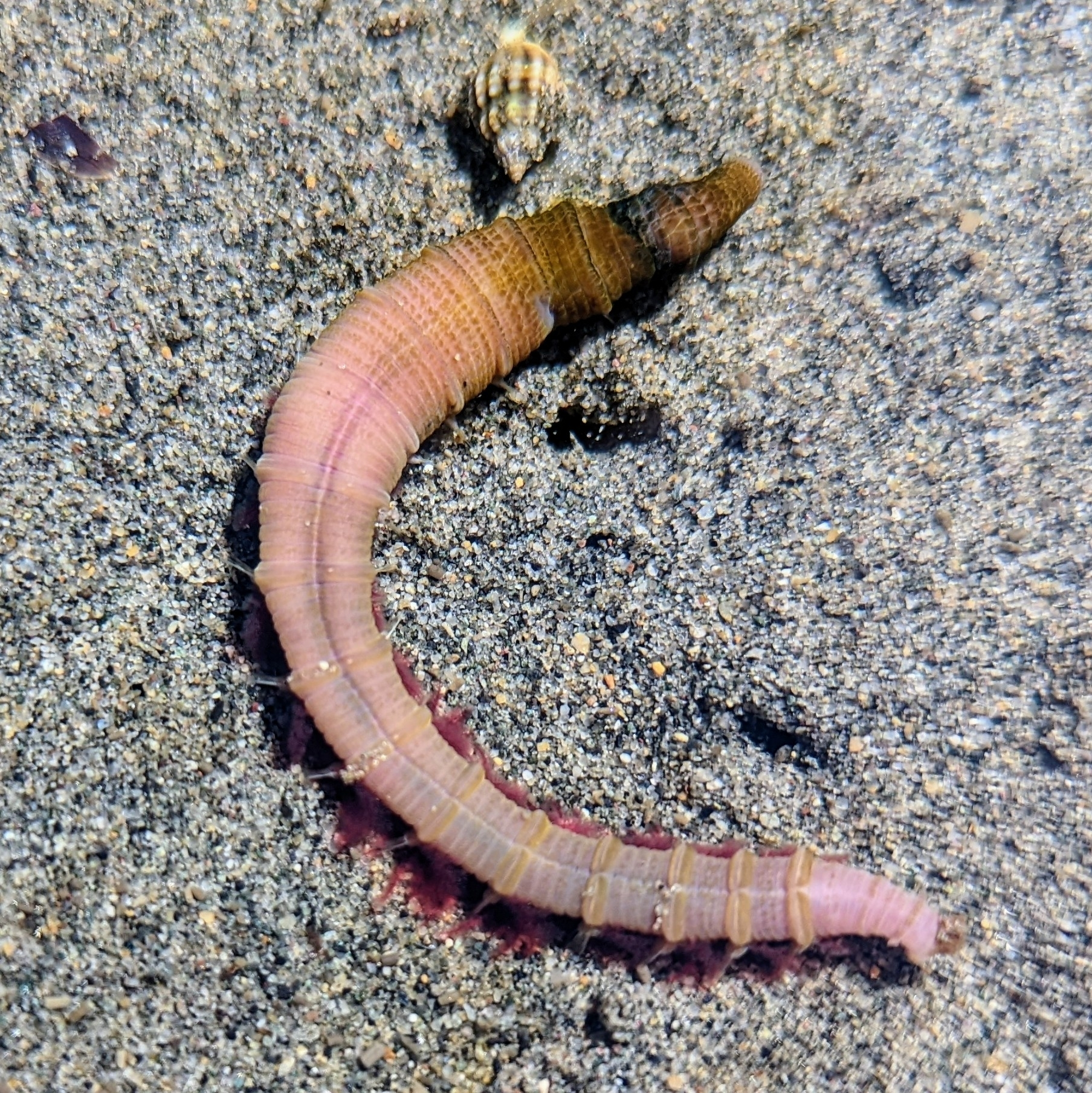

Scientific classification
- Kingdom: Animalia
- Phylum: Annelida
- Clade: Pleistoannelida
- Clade: Sedentaria
- Clade: Maldanomorpha
- Family: Arenicolidae
- Genus: Abarenicola
- Species: A. pacifica

Binomial name
- Abarenicola pacifica Healy & Wells, 1959

= Abarenicola pacifica =

Species of annelid worm

Abarenicola pacifica or the Pacific lugworm is a large species of polychaete worm found on the west coast of North America and also in Japan. The worms live out of sight in burrows under the sand and produce casts which are visible on the surface.

Polychaetes, or marine bristle worms, have elongated bodies divided into many segments. Each segment may bear setae (bristles) and parapodia (paddle-like appendages). Some species live freely, either swimming, crawling or burrowing, and these are known as "errant". Others live permanently in tubes, either calcareous or parchment-like, and these are known as "sedentary".

== Description ==
Abarenicola pacifica is a large worm growing up to fifteen centimetres in length with an elongated, segmented body which is tapered at both ends. The head has no appendages, palps or eyes but has a prostomium and evertible oesophagus. The body is divided into three regions which are sometimes differently coloured. The segments are wider than they are long and most have setae borne on parapodia. There are between four and seven pairs of oesophageal caeca, the anterior one being larger than the others. There are some capillary setae and the segments in the middle region bear up to thirteen trunk-like sets of gills which are red due to the hemoglobin circulating in the blood. The neuropodia of these segments are short and widely separated ventrally. There are no setae on the segments of the posterior region.

== Distribution and habitat ==
A. pacifica is found in the intertidal and subtidal zones round the coasts of North America between Alaska and northern California and in Japanese waters. It is found living under the surface of sand flats and muddy shores, and in estuaries where it can tolerate salinities of as low as 23% of normal seawater for short periods, although 50% is a more sustainable level.

== Biology ==
Like other lugworms, A. pacifica lives under the sand in a J-shaped burrow with its head at the bottom and its tail near the surface. It is a deposit feeder and the head is constantly swallowing muddy sand. This creates a shallow depression on the surface. The cleaner sand, with nutrients removed, is expelled through the posterior end of the worm and ends up as a neat pile of coiled sand on the surface. Bacteria and microfauna may colonise the worm's gut and enrich the faecal casts. Some beaches may have fifty to a hundred lugworms per square metre and the sand is consequently being perpetually recycled by the worms. The lugworm maintains a constant stream of water through the burrow by the alternate contraction and dilatation of its body segments. Gas exchange is facilitated by the bushy tufts of gills which project from its middle region and which continually turn and flex. These adaptations to life under the sediment provide protection for the worm from desiccation and predation while providing a plentiful supply of food and oxygen. At low tide, when the sediment in which the lugworm is living is no longer covered by water, aerial respiration takes place.

When feeding, A. pacifica everts its oesophagus (which then resembles a mushroom) and engulfs a "mouthful" of sand before restoring the oesophagus to its rightful position. Organic detritus and organisms such as nematodes, diatoms, bacteria and microphytes are ingested with the sand and digested in the gut. Periodically, the worm reverses up its burrow and defecates near the surface, creating a mound of coiled cast.

Individuals of A. pacifica are either male or female. Reproduction occurs once a year in the spring at a time when the worm has a high level of stored fats. The embryos are brooded in the burrow. The larvae do not feed and only spend a short time drifting in the water, or possibly none at all. When they have developed to five or six segments, they leave their mother's burrow and start living independently in the top few millimetres of substrate. They grow rapidly and become mature in one to two years.

== Ecology ==
Pinnixa schmitti, the Schmitt pea crab, is a commensal of A. pacifica and is often found cohabiting in its burrow. The crab may benefit from the protective environment but it is unclear whether the worm gains from the arrangement.

A. pacifica may be useful in the recovery of beaches from the effects of oil pollution. The worm helps transport sediment from lower depths to the surface where aerobic microbes can break down the pollutant hydrocarbons. It is considered to be useful as an indicator species for monitoring ecological conditions after an oil spillage, being the second most useful organism after the Baltic clam (Macoma balthica). This is because of the abundance of the lugworm and its widespread distribution near oil facilities.

The burrowing activities of A. pacifica may also cause the release of methylmercury and other heavy metals from underlying sediments into the water above. The breeding success of clams such as Macoma and Mya spp. is reduced when A. pacifica is present. Disturbance to the sediment has also been associated with a decline in the abundance of the polychaete Pygospio elegans and the crustacean Cumella vulgaris, both of which happen to be predators on juvenile lugworms. The rock sandpiper (Calidris ptilocnemis), the shrimp (Crangon spp.) and the isopod, Saduria entomon prey on both adults and young.
