= Disconatis contubernalis =

Scientific classification
- Domain: Eukaryota
- Kingdom: Animalia
- Phylum: Annelida
- Clade: Pleistoannelida
- Subclass: Errantia
- Order: Phyllodocida
- Family: Polynoidae
- Genus: Disconatis
- Species: D. contubernalis

Binomial name
- Disconatis contubernalis Hanley & Burke, 1988

Species of annelid

Disconatis contubernalis is only known from Australia where it is commensal in the tubes of marine annelids of the family Maldanidae.

== Description ==
Disconatis contubernalis has up to 152 segments and 22–80 pairs of elytra; the first pair are much larger than the following elytra which have a few large papillae on the surface. Disconatis conturbernalis which has large papillae on the elytra but a smooth body, in contrast with the other species in the genus, Disconatis accolus, which has smooth elytra but with minute papillae on the dorsal surface of the body. The lateral antennae are inserted ventral to the median antenna. Notopodia are vestigial and notochaetae are absent, while the neuropodium is rounded and the neurochaetae are unidentate but have serrations on the convex side.

== Biology and Ecology ==
Disconatis contubernalis has a commensal relationship with annelid worms in the Maldanidae family, where D. contubernalis lives inside the tubes they create.
