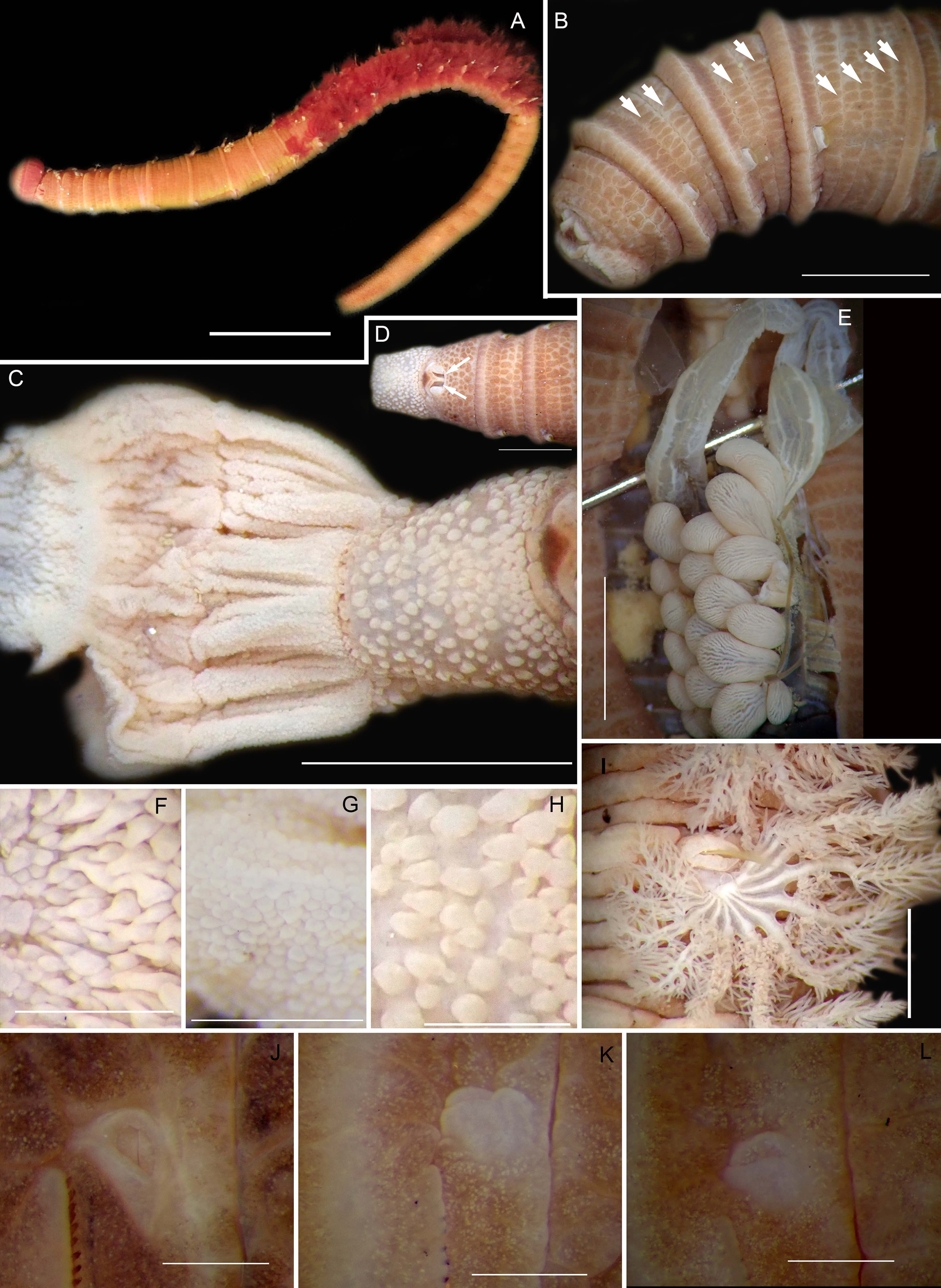
- Morphology of Abarenicola gilchristi Wells, 1963

Scientific classification
- Domain: Eukaryota
- Kingdom: Animalia
- Phylum: Annelida
- Clade: Pleistoannelida
- Clade: Sedentaria
- Clade: Maldanomorpha
- Family: Arenicolidae
- Genus: Abarenicola; Wells, 1959

= Abarenicola =

Genus of annelid worms

Abarenicola is a genus of polychaetes belonging to the family Arenicolidae.

The genus has almost cosmopolitan distribution.

Species:

- Abarenicola affinis (Ashworth, 1903)
- Abarenicola assimilis (Ehlers, 1897)
- Abarenicola brevior Wells, 1963
- Abarenicola claparedi (Levinsen, 1884)
- Abarenicola devia Wells, 1963
- Abarenicola gilchristi Wells, 1963
- Abarenicola haswelli Wells, 1963
- Abarenicola insularum Wells, 1963
- Abarenicola oceanica
- Abarenicola pacifica Healy & Wells, 1959
- Abarenicola pusilla (Quatrefages, 1866)
