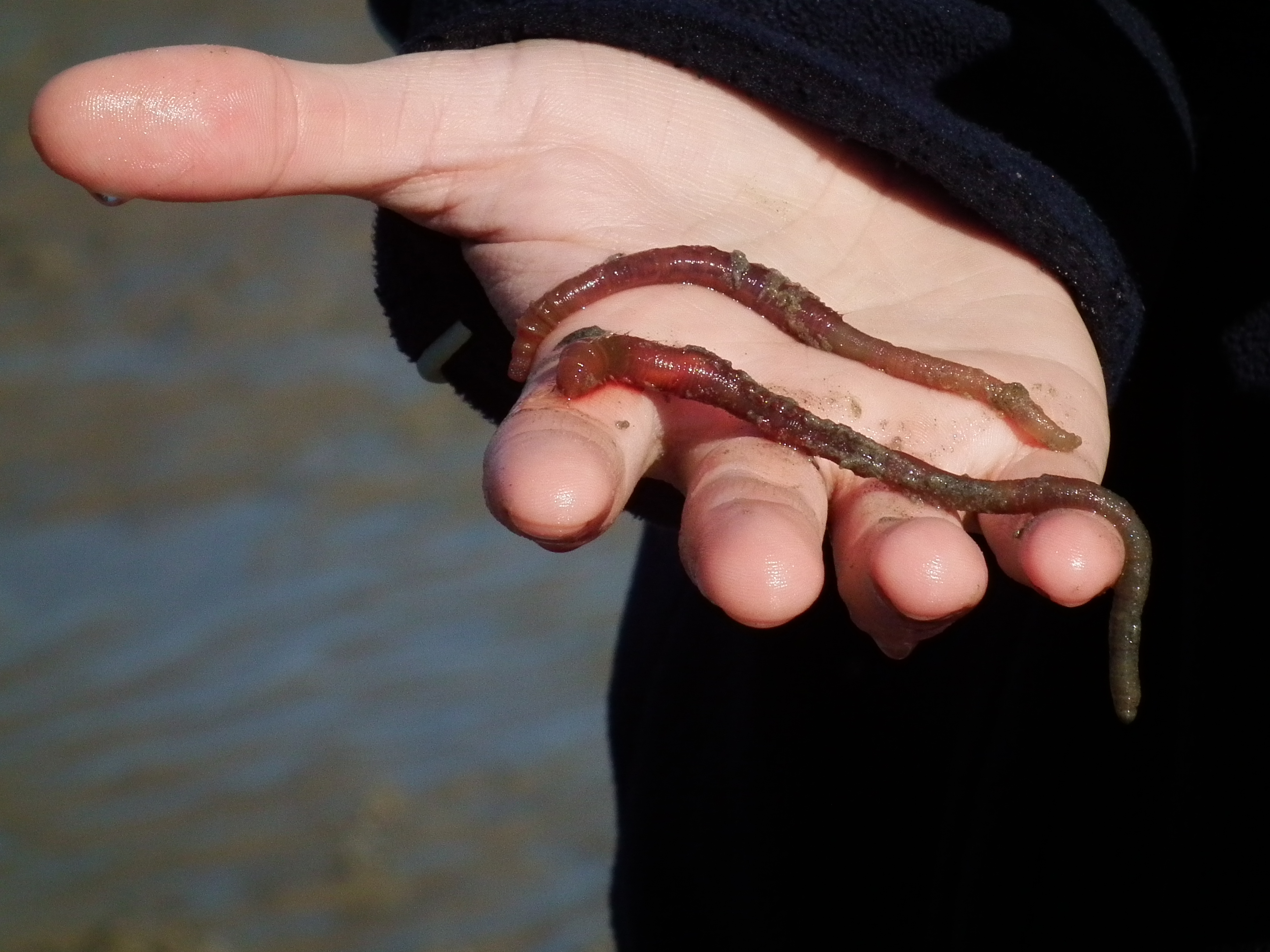

Scientific classification
- Kingdom: Animalia
- Phylum: Annelida
- Clade: Pleistoannelida
- Clade: Sedentaria
- Clade: Maldanomorpha
- Family: Arenicolidae
- Genus: Arenicola
- Species: A. marina

Binomial name
- Arenicola marina (Linnaeus, 1758)

= Blow lugworm =

Species of annelid worm

Blow lugworm cast at low tide

The blow lugworm (Arenicola marina), also known as sandworm, is a large species of marine worm. Its coiled castings are a familiar sight on a beach at low tide but the animal itself is rarely seen except by those who, from curiosity or to use as fishing bait, dig the worm out of the sand.

== Description ==
When fully grown, blow lugworms of the coasts of Europe grow to 5.1 in (13 cm) long and 0.375 in (1 cm) in diameter. It weighs 2 to 5 oz (57 to 142 g). The body is like that of any typical annelid: ringed or segmented. Its head end, which is blackish-red and bears no tentacles or bristles, passes into a fatter middle part which is red. This in turn passes into a thinner yellowish-red tail end. The middle part has bristles along its sides and also pairs of feathery gills. There is a well-developed system of blood vessels with red blood rich in the oxygen-carrying pigment, haemoglobin. Lugworms also have hairs on the outside of their bodies that act as external gills. These can rapidly increase their uptake of oxygen. Lugworm blood has a large oxygen carrying capacity which may have medical applications.

A related species of lugworm also found in the UK is the black lugworm (Arenicola defodiens). As well as growing larger than blow lugworms, black lugworms are generally much darker, often totally black. They can also be distinguished by the different wormcasts they produce; Arenicola defodiens makes a spiral cast, while that of Arenicola marina is jumbled.

== Medical interest ==
The haemoglobin of Arenicola marina, called M101, can carry up to 156 molecules of O_{2} while human haemoglobin can carry 4. This makes M101 an interesting blood substitute and promising to use as transportation of organ graftand in the healing of severe burns. Several therapeutical products are being developed and commercialized by the French company Hemarina.
