= Ollie and Quentin =

British comic strip

- Author: Piers Baker
- Current status/schedule: Concluded
- Launch date: 2002; 2008 (syndication)
- End date: 2011
- Syndicate(s): King Features Syndicate
- Genre(s): Humor, gag-a-day

Ollie and Quentin is a British comic strip created by the British cartoonist Piers Baker in 2002 and later distributed by King Features Syndicate.

== Characters and story ==
The buddy storyline follows the friendship of seagull Ollie and lugworm Quentin. King Features offers a detailed description of the setting and characters:

Ollie and Quentin is a buddy strip about the unlikely friendship between a seagull named Ollie and an accident-prone lugworm named Quentin. They are best friends despite the obvious food chain disparity that suggests Ollie should be interested in Quentin more as a snack than as a friend. They live in a coastal town with Nobby, an affable single guy who serves as both foil and witness to their silly, mischievous high jinks. During their adventurous romps together, Ollie is somewhat oblivious to the dangers that Quentin's small size presents. Despite Ollie's protective brotherly nature, Quentin endures many hysterical, albeit, unfortunate accidents, such as getting sucked into a vacuum cleaner, being blown up as a party balloon and even requiring brief hospitalization after Nobby mistakes him for a piece of chewing gum.

== Origin ==
The strip originated in the United Kingdom in 2002, with King Features introducing it to international syndication in early 2008. Baker considers the strip "an homage to all the poor lugworms that he used as bait while sea fishing in his youth."

On 19 December 2011 Baker announced that the lack of newspaper interest had brought the syndicated strip to an end:

Ollie and Quentin simply isn’t attracting newspaper readers, so King Features and I have reluctantly decided to end that part of our relationship at the end of the year. This is painfully sad but not unexpected. Ollie and Quentin is a gem of a comic, but that just hasn’t translated into newspaper sales which are so vital to the success of any comic... I have never worked harder or longer, never sacrificed more and have never earned less in my whole cartoon career. That said I wouldn’t have missed the last four years for anything. My ambition in life was to be a newspaper syndicated cartoonist and for four wonderful years I lived that dream. . . I won’t miss hearing that my comic has been dropped from a newspaper or reading my depressing monthly sales reports. I won’t miss comic polls, I won’t miss despairing at the decisions of newspapers (a fight that can never be won), and I won’t miss staying up too late, never reading books, rarely traveling and being poor.

The same day, King Features announced that the strip would begin online reruns in January 2012, and the strip relaunch began January 9 as Ollie and Quentin Revisited.

The strips were collected in the book Ollie and Quentin, published December 2011.
