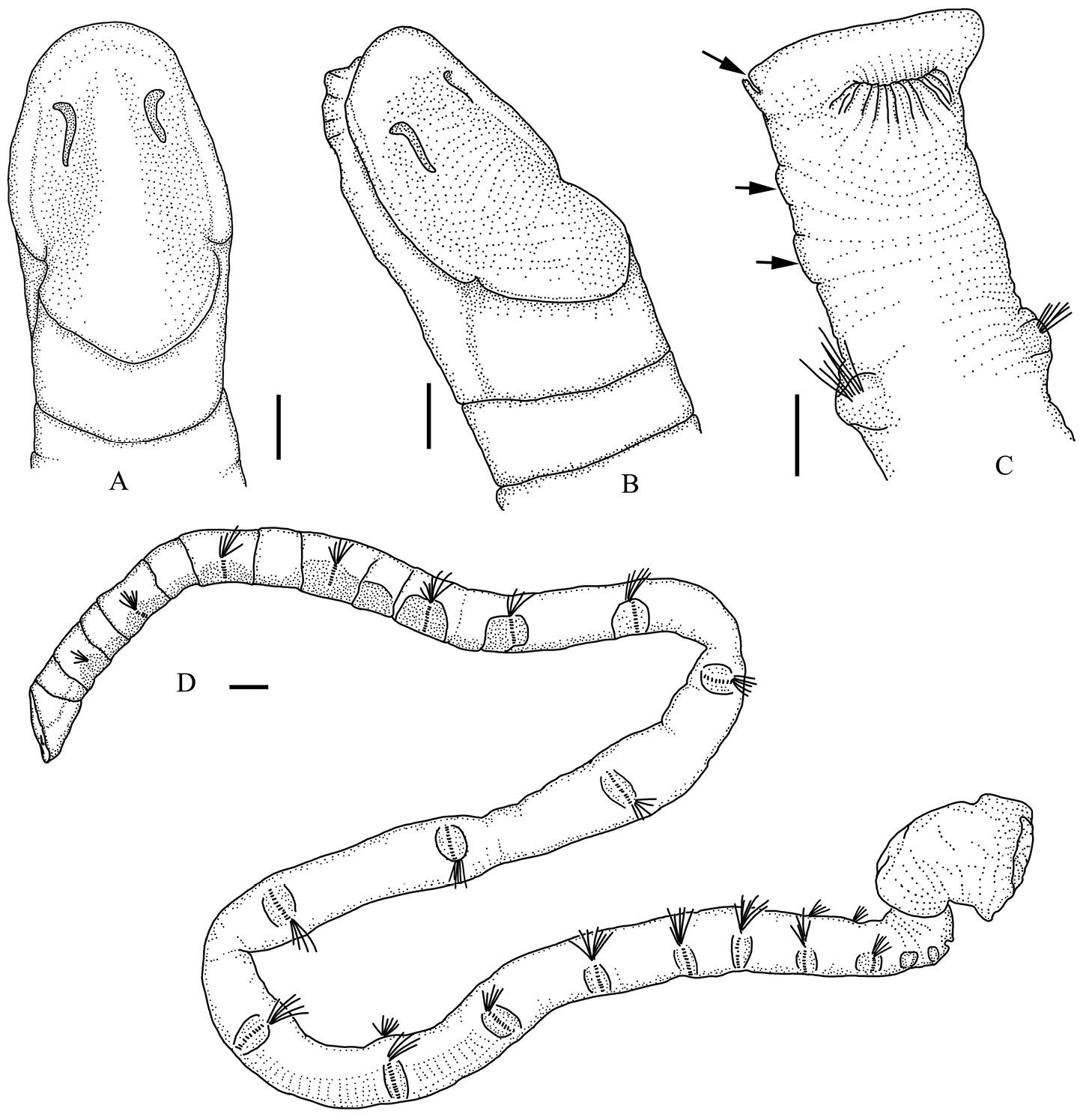
- Maldane adunca

Scientific classification
- Kingdom: Animalia
- Phylum: Annelida
- Clade: Pleistoannelida
- Clade: Sedentaria
- Clade: Maldanomorpha
- Family: Maldanidae; Malmgren 1867

Subfamilies
- Rhodininae; Lumbriclymeninae; Notoproctinae; Maldaninae; Euclymeninae; Nicomachinae

= Maldanidae =

Family of annelids

Maldanidae is a family of more than 200 species of marine polychaetes commonly known as bamboo worms or maldanid worms. They belong to the order Capitellida, in the phylum Annelida. They are most closely related to family Arenicolidae, and together form the clade Maldanomorpha.

== Morphology ==
Maldanid worms have a long and cylindrical body that usually bends at one or both ends. It can be divided into four parts: 1) a head, formed by a dorsally positioned prostomium that is fused to the peristomium, sometimes with a flattened cephalic plate; 2) a thorax, formed by the first four chaetigers (i.e. chaetae-bearing segments), usually with strong spines; 3) an abdomen, with several longer chaetigers that are often followed by a number of achaetous (i.e. without chaetae) segments; 4) a posterior end, with a pygidium that contains the anus. The maldanid pygidium takes a wide variety of forms such as conical, plate-shaped and funnel-shape. Sometimes a few prepygidial (i.e. anterior to the pygidium) segments can be observed.

The parapodia are generally biramous, with elongated median chaetigers. The notochaetae appear as various forms of capillaries, while the neurochaetae appear as various forms of uncini (i.e. hook-like structures), sometimes replaced by acicular (i.e. needle-like) spines in some anterior segments.

== Ecology ==
=== Habitat ===
Species of maldanid worms are distributed in all marine regions of Earth, from the intertidal regions to deep waters. Some species inhabit estuarine areas, and some species have been seen living on hydrothermal vents. They are benthic creatures that build tubes made of mineral particles of diverse sizes and textures; these tubes are fixed to stones, shells, algal holdfasts, mud or sandbanks through a thin and transparent matrix of mucus that is produced after the end of the larval period. Several species build tubes under rocks forming horizontal galleries, or vertical galleris in sand or mud at the bottom of estuaries.

=== Nutrition ===
They consume organic material, mostly composed of detritus, although diatoms and protozoans have been seen in the gut of some species. Most of them are head-down feeders that transport sediments upward from below the ocean floor surface. However some species have been observed dragging surface material down their tube into a feeding cavity. During feeding, the worms extend a papillae-covered globular proboscis through an increase of the coelomic pressure in the first four chaetigers. An enhanced bacterial growth observed within the tube wall of one species, Maldane sarsi, might also be a source of nutrition. Another species, Praxillura maculata, bears stiff particle-collecting spikes attached to the tube's end to collect algae and organic particles and transport them to the gut.

=== Reproduction ===
Maldanid worms are gonochoristic and present a variety of reproductive modes. Some species spawn their gametes into seawater, where fertilization occurs; others may incubate eggs in the tube or directly until the development of larvae.

They are capable of both anterior and posterior regeneration after suffering damage due to their fragile and easily fragmented bodies, and at least one species that reproduces asexually has been described.

=== Embryonic development ===
Like other invertebrates in the clade Spiralia, bamboo worms undergo spiral cleavage during their early development. The larvae have a prototroch, neurotroch and telotroch, as is common in many polychaetes. The larval period is short, and the larval development is either lecithotrophic (i.e. with a yolk sac attached for nutrition) or direct (i.e. having to feed independently).

== Phylogeny ==
Maldanidae and Arenicolidae are united by the clade Maldanomorpha inside of Capitellida, an order of polychaetes in the phylum Annelida. According to a phylogeny based on morphological data from 2011, several of the subfamilies inside Maldanidae are united under a clade called 'Maldanoplaca'. Members of this clade would be united by the evolution of the pygidium into an anal plate.

- Maldanidae
  - Rhodininae
  - - Lumbriclymeninae
    - Maldanoplaca
      - Notoproctinae
      - - Nicomachinae
        - Euclymeninae

However, a molecular phylogeny in 2018 reveals that both Maldanoplaca and the subfamily Euclymeninae are paraphyletic.

- Maldanidae
  - Rhodininae
  - - - - Lumbriclymeninae
        - Notoproctinae
      - - 'Euclymeninae'
        - - - 'Euclymeninae'
            - Nicomachinae
          - 'Euclymeninae'
    - Maldaninae

== Classification ==
The complete classification of bamboo worms accounts for 6 subfamilies, 38 genera and around 261 species.

- Subfamily Rhodininae Arwidsson 1906
  - Rhodine Malmgren 1865 – 7 species
  - Boguea Hartman 1945 – 2 species
  - Boguella Hartman & Fauchald 1971 – 1 species
- Subfamily Lumbriclymeninae Arwidsson 1906
  - Lumbriclymene Sars 1872 – 10 species
  - Lumbriclymenella Arwidsson 1906 – 2 species
  - Clymenopsis Verrill 1900 – 4 species
  - Praxillura Verrill 1880 – 6 species
- Subfamily Notoproctinae Detinova 1982
  - Notoproctus Arwidsson 1906 – 9 species
- Subfamily Maldaninae Malmgren 1867
  - Asychis Kinberg 1867 (=Maldanopsis Verrill 1900; Branchioasychis Monro 1939) – c. 5 species
  - Bathyasychis Detinova 1982 – 1 species
  - Chirimia Light 1991 (=Chrysothemis Kinberg 1867) – c. 5 species
  - Maldane Grube 1860 (=Heteromaldane Ehlers 1908; Sonatsa Chamberlin 1919) – 18 species
  - Metasychis Light 1991 – 4 species
  - Sabaco Kinberg 1867 (=Maldanopsis Verrill 1900; =Branchioasychis Monro 1939) – 9 species
- Subfamily Euclymeninae* Arwidsson 1906
  - Aclymene Buzhinskaja 1995 – 1 species
  - Axiothella Verrill 1900 (=Axiotheia Malmgren 1865) – 19 species
  - Clymenella Verrill 1873 (=Paraxiothea Webster 1879) – 19 species
  - Clymenura Verrill 1900 – 9 species
  - Euclymene Verrill 1900 (=Arwidssonia McIntosh 1914; Caecisirrus Arwidsson 1911; Leiocephalus Quatrefages 1885) – c. 30 species
  - Eupraxillella Hartmann-Schröder & Rosenfeldt 1989 – 1 species
  - Gravierella Fauvel 1919 – 1 species
  - Heteroclymene Arwidsson 1906 – 2 species
  - Isocirrus Arwidsson 1906 – 7 species
  - Johnstonia Quatrefages 1866 – c. 5 species
  - Leiochone Grube 1868 – 6 species
  - Macroclymene Verrill 1900 – c. 5 species
  - Macroclymenella Augener 1926 – 1 species
  - Maldanella McIntosh 1885 (=Abyssoclymene Hartman 1967) – 12 species
  - Microclymene Arwidsson 1906 – 5 species
  - Minusculisquama Pettibone 1983 – 1 species
  - Mylitta (annelid) Kinberg 1866 – 1 species
  - Petaloclymene Augener 1918 – 2 species
  - Praxilletta Verrill 1881 (=Iphianissa Kinberg 1867; Praxilla Malmgren 1865) – c. 15 species
  - Pseudoclymene Arwidsson 1906 – 1 species
  - Proclymene Arwidsson 1906 – 1 species
- Subfamily Nicomachinae Arwidsson 1906
  - Micromaldane Mesnil 1897 – 7 species
  - Nicomache Malmgren 1865 (=Sabella Linnaeus 1767; Clymene Savigny 1818) – 17 species
  - Petalopoctus Quatrefages 1865 – c. 10 species
