= Piers Baker =

British cartoonist

- Born: Piers Hans-Peter Baker Surbiton, England
- Area: Cartoonist
- Notable works: Ollie and Quentin

Piers Hans-Peter Baker is a British cartoonist best known for his comic strip Ollie and Quentin, distributed internationally by King Features Syndicate, about the curious activities of a seagull (Ollie) and a lugworm (Quentin).

== Early life and education ==
The eldest of five children, Baker was a student in Surrey and Somerset. During a year of volunteer work in Egypt, he survived a plane crash. Back in the UK, he began studying at the Epsom School of Art. After he accidentally left his artwork on a train, he chose to leave college and instead seek employment.

== Design and illustration ==
He began his career as the junior member of a small advertising agency where he developed his graphic design skills and eventually launched his own graphic design firm, specialising in food packaging illustration and design. As he recalled, "In the years following, I helped run a small design agency where my specialty was designing ice lolly wrappers for Wall's Ice Cream, including Feast, Twister and Split. Much of my work can still be seen in trash cans around the UK and Europe. In 2000, I decided to pursue my lifelong ambition of becoming a cartoonist and worked as an illustrator of children’s educational schoolbooks."

== Comic strips ==
In 2002, he created Ollie and Quentin. The pair had originally started life in 1997 as characters alongside Stormy Stan the Lifeboat Man for the Royal National Lifeboat Institution. Six years later in January 2008, Ollie and Quentin was selected by King Features for international distribution. Interviewed by Janine Pineo for the Bangor Daily News, Baker explained the strip's development:

"This was the first time I’d submitted any strip to King Features. That said, I’ve been working on Ollie and Quentin for many years and didn’t want to submit it until I felt it was strong enough. I know they receive 6,000 submissions a year and only launch three or four, so I could only send them something I was really happy with. I decided a long time ago to take the slow, steady approach. My plan was to get a weekly strip running in a few small UK papers and then see if a daily version was possible. I’d say it took three years or 150 strips before I felt I was ready. We don’t have cartoon syndicates in the U.K. so as King Features is the world’s premier cartoon syndication company, I thought I’d start there. I sent a submission in the summer of 2006 and heard back in October that same year when I’d completely forgotten about it. From then until now I have been in 'development', speaking to my brilliant editor, Brendan Burford, once a week to go through the rough strips I’ve sent him."

His strips were collected in the book Ollie and Quentin, published December 2011.

== Whiteboard Animation ==
Baker is a leading whiteboard animation artist, bringing ‘doodle ads’ and explainer videos to the UK back in 2004 through his Cartoons Live project and later with Doodle Ads. He is the owner of Doodle Whiteboard, producing videos that convey complex ideas in an accessible visual video form with subtitles and in multiple international languages.

== Personal life ==
Standing six-feet-six inches tall, Baker was a champion 400m runner in his youth. He was a non-speaking 'extra' in the 1981 Oscar-winning British historical sports drama film Chariots of Fire, appearing in the iconic Trinity College 'Great Court Run' courtyard scene. He lives and works in Manchester in the UK.
