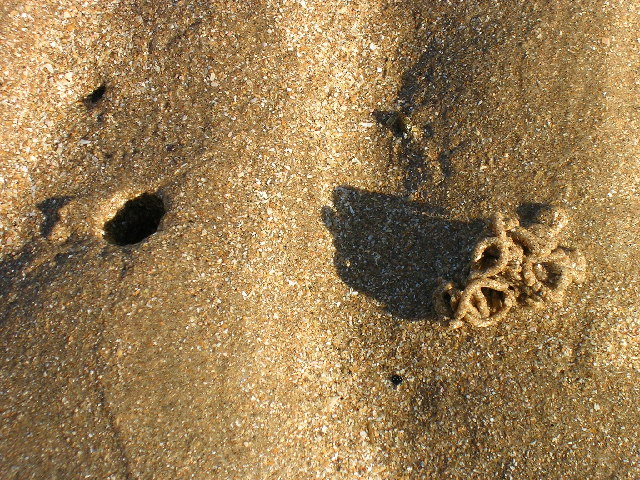
- Cast and depression caused by buried Arenicola marina.

Scientific classification
- Kingdom: Animalia
- Phylum: Annelida
- Clade: Pleistoannelida
- Clade: Sedentaria
- Clade: Maldanomorpha
- Family: Arenicolidae; Johnston 1835

Type genus
- Arenicola Lamarck, 1801

Genera
- Abarenicola; Arenicola; Arenicolides; Branchiomaldane; ?Clymenides; ?Eruca; ?Protocapitella

= Arenicolidae =

Family of annelids

Arenicolidae is a family of marine polychaete worms. They are commonly known as lugworms and the little coils of sand they produce are commonly seen on the beach. Arenicolids are found worldwide, mostly living in burrows in sandy substrates. Most are detritivores but some graze on algae.

== Description ==
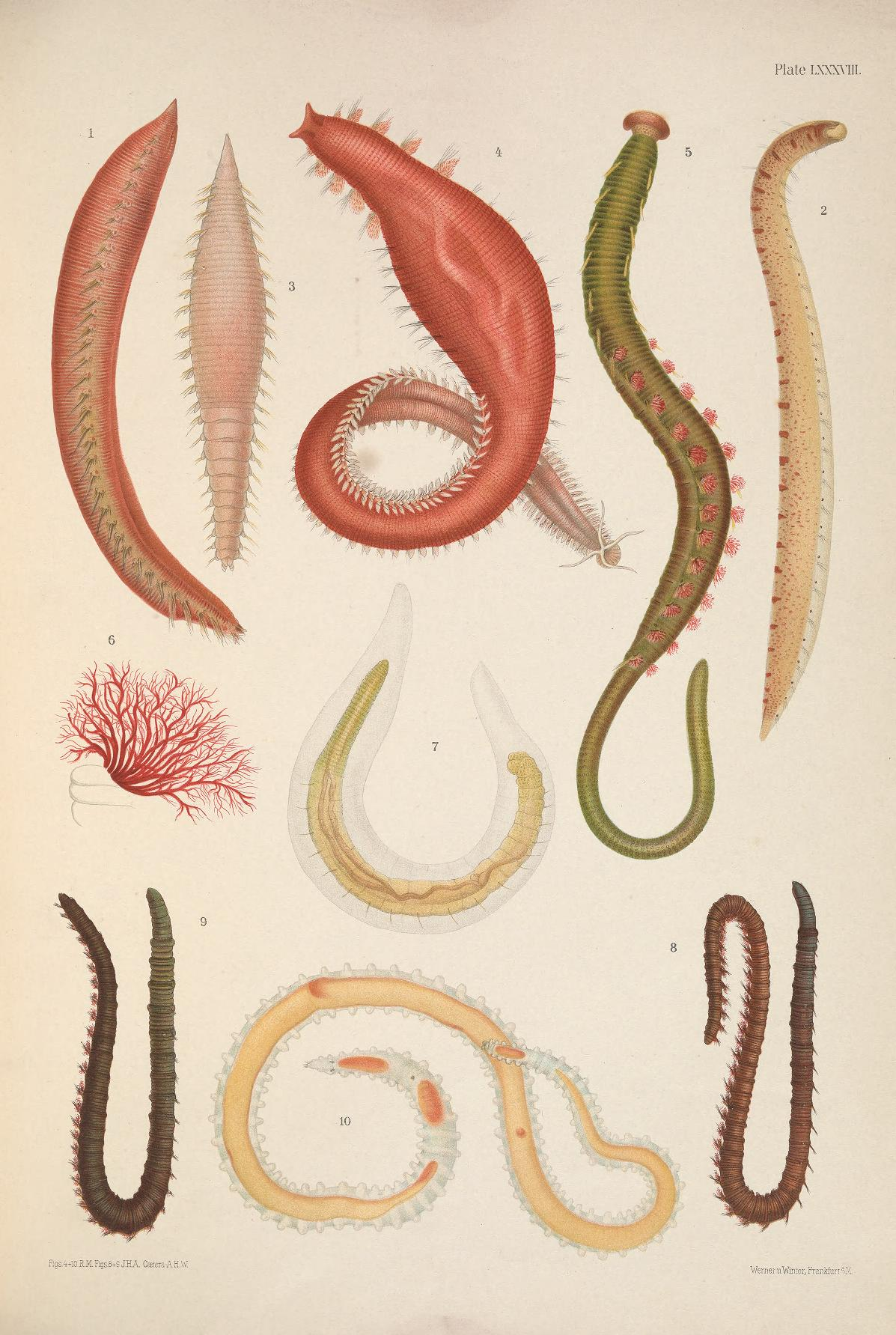
Arenicolidae figs 5-9

The arenicolids are characterised by an elongated cylindrical body separated into two or three distinct regions. The prostomium has no appendages or palps. There are one or two anterior segments without setae. On the other segments, all the setae are unbranched, including the capillary setae and the rostrate uncini. The notopodia are bluntly truncate and the neuropodia are elongated tori forming long transverse welts in some of the setigers. The notosetae have either a capillary function or act as limbs and the neurosetae are rostrate hooks. There are branchiae present on some of the setigers in the middle or posterior regions. Apart from the genus Branchiomaldane, the lugworms are not easy to confuse with other polychaetes. Their tough cuticle and their distinct branchial region with strongly tufted branchiae are characteristic.

== Classification ==
The family Arenicolidae contains 4 genera and 24 species.

- Abarenicola Wells 1959 – 11 species
- Arenicola Lamarck 1801 – 7 species
- Arenicolides Mesnil 1898 – 2 species
- Branchiomaldane Langerhans 1881 – 4 species

There are also three uncertain genera.

- Clymenides
- Eruca
- Protocapitella

Fossil traces indicate that the group has existed since at least the Late Jurassic.

== See also ==
- Arenicola marina
- Abarenicola pacifica
