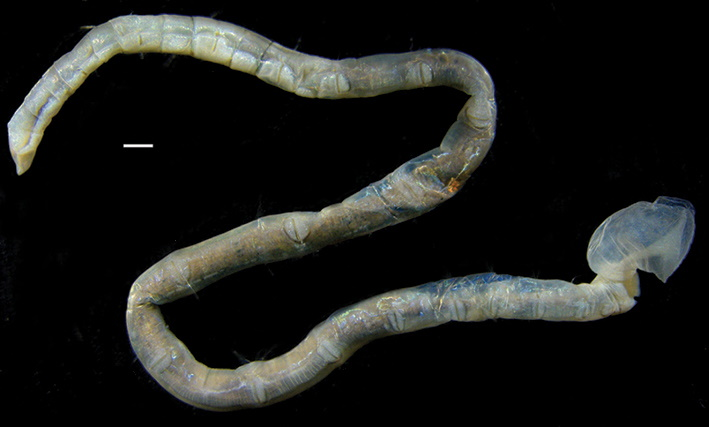
- Maldanid worm

Scientific classification
- Domain: Eukaryota
- Kingdom: Animalia
- Phylum: Annelida
- Clade: Pleistoannelida
- Clade: Sedentaria
- Clade: Maldanomorpha; Meyer & Bartolomaeus 1995

Families
- Arenicolidae; Maldanidae

= Maldanomorpha =

Group of invertebrate animals

Maldanomorpha is a monophyletic group, or clade, of polychaete worms in the phylum Annelida. Several phylogenetic analyses based on morphological and molecular data have shown that this clade unites the families Arenicolidae and Maldanidae. The two main synapomorphies, morphological characters described to unite both families, are a lecithotrophic larval development and the presence of an uncinus, a hook-like structure with barbs.
