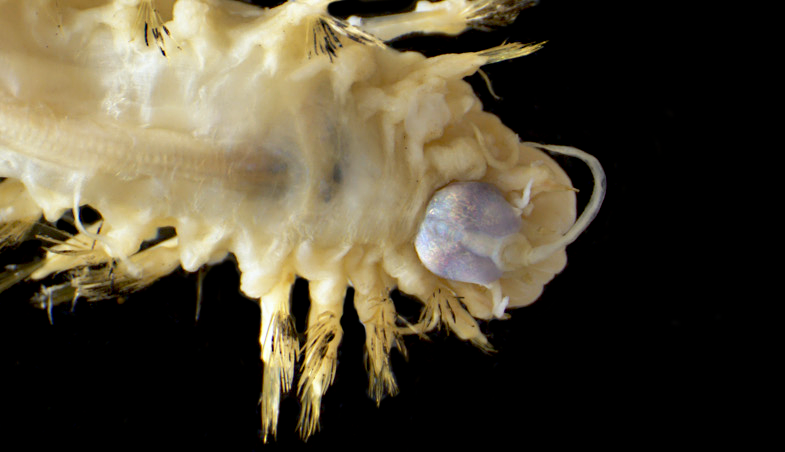
- Anterior of a Eunoe abyssorum specimen from the Australian Museum.

Scientific classification
- Kingdom: Animalia
- Phylum: Annelida
- Clade: Pleistoannelida
- Subclass: Errantia
- Order: Phyllodocida
- Family: Polynoidae
- Genus: Eunoe
- Species: E. abyssorum

Binomial name
- Eunoe abyssorum McIntosh, 1885

= Eunoe abyssorum =

Species of annelid worm

Eunoe abyssorum is a scale worm first described in 1885. The type locality is in the Great Australian Bight, which is south of mainland Australia.

== Description ==
Number of segments 35–40; elytra 15 pairs. Violet-coloured prostomium. Anterior margin of prostomium with an acute anterior projection. Lateral antennae inserted ventrally (beneath prostomium and median antenna). Notochaetae distinctly thicker than neurochaetae. Bidentate neurochaetae absent.

Image plate of different features and characters of Eunoe abyssorum. From an Australian Museum specimen.
