= Eunoe purpurea =

Scientific classification
- Kingdom: Animalia
- Phylum: Annelida
- Clade: Pleistoannelida
- Subclass: Errantia
- Order: Phyllodocida
- Family: Polynoidae
- Genus: Eunoe
- Species: E. purpurea

Binomial name
- Eunoe purpurea Treadwell, 1936

Species of annelid worm

Eunoe purperea is a scale worm described from the North Atlantic Ocean off Bermuda at depths of about 900–1600m.

== Description ==
Number of segments 30; elytra 14 pairs (assumed). Purplish brown especially anteriorly. Prostomium anterior margin comprising two rounded lobes. Lateral antennae inserted ventrally (beneath prostomium and median antenna). Notochaetae distinctly thicker than neurochaetae. Bidentate neurochaetae present (check; if confirmed cannot be in Eunoe).
