= Eunoe iphionoides =

Scientific classification
- Kingdom: Animalia
- Phylum: Annelida
- Clade: Pleistoannelida
- Subclass: Errantia
- Order: Phyllodocida
- Family: Polynoidae
- Genus: Eunoe
- Species: E. iphionoides

Binomial name
- Eunoe iphionoides McIntosh 1885

Species of annelid worm

Eunoe iphionoides is a scale worm known from the South Pacific Ocean off New Zealand at depths of 549–3817m.

== Description ==
Number of segments 38; elytra 15 pairs. No distinct pigmentation pattern. Anterior margin of prostomium with an acute anterior projection. Lateral antennae inserted ventrally (beneath prostomium and median antenna). Notochaetae about as thick as neurochaetae. Bidentate neurochaetae absent.
