= Eunoe opalina =

Scientific classification
- Kingdom: Animalia
- Phylum: Annelida
- Clade: Pleistoannelida
- Subclass: Errantia
- Order: Phyllodocida
- Family: Polynoidae
- Genus: Eunoe
- Species: E. opalina

Binomial name
- Eunoe opalina McIntosh 1885

Species of annelid worm

Eunoe opalina is a scale worm widely distributed in the Southern Ocean at depths of about 200–1400m.

== Description ==
Number of segments 38; elytra 15 pairs. No distinct pigmentation pattern. Prostomium anterior margin comprising a pair of acute anterior projections. Lateral antennae inserted ventrally (beneath Prostomium and median antenna). Notochaetae thinner than neurochaetae. Bidentate neurochaetae absent.

== Commensalism ==
E. oplina is commensal. Its host taxon is a sea cucumber: Bathyplotes bongraini.
