= Eunoe yedoensis =

Scientific classification
- Kingdom: Animalia
- Phylum: Annelida
- Clade: Pleistoannelida
- Subclass: Errantia
- Order: Phyllodocida
- Family: Polynoidae
- Genus: Eunoe
- Species: E. yedoensis

Binomial name
- Eunoe yedoensis McIntosh 1885

Species of annelid worm

Eunoe yedoensis is a scale worm described from off Japan in the North Pacific Ocean at a depth of 641 m.

== Description ==
Number of segments 41; elytra 15 pairs. No distinct pigmentation pattern. Prostomium anterior margin comprising a pair of acute anterior projections. Lateral antennae inserted ventrally (beneath Prostomium and median antenna). elytra marginal fringe of papillae present. Notochaetae distinctly thicker than neurochaetae. Bidentate neurochaetae absent.
