= Eunoe tritoni =

Scientific classification
- Kingdom: Animalia
- Phylum: Annelida
- Clade: Pleistoannelida
- Subclass: Errantia
- Order: Phyllodocida
- Family: Polynoidae
- Genus: Eunoe
- Species: E. tritoni

Binomial name
- Eunoe tritoni McIntosh, 1900

Species of annelid

Eunoe tritoni is a scale worm described from the Færö Channel in the North Atlantic Ocean.

== Description ==
Number of segments 37 (probably); elytra 15 pairs (presumably). No distinct pigmentation pattern. Prostomium anterior margin comprising a pair of acute anterior projections. Lateral antennae inserted ventrally (beneath prostomium and median antenna). elytra marginal fringe of papillae present. Notochaetae about as thick as neurochaetae. Bidentate neurochaetae absent.
