= Eunoe macrophthalma =

Scientific classification
- Kingdom: Animalia
- Phylum: Annelida
- Clade: Pleistoannelida
- Subclass: Errantia
- Order: Phyllodocida
- Family: Polynoidae
- Genus: Eunoe
- Species: E. macrophthalma

Binomial name
- Eunoe macrophthalma McIntosh, 1924

Species of annelid worm

Eunoe macrophthalma is a scale worm described from the South Atlantic Ocean from a depth of about 2200m.

== Description ==
The species has 15 pairs of elytra (assumed). Lateral antennae inserted ventrally (beneath prostomium and median antenna). Notochaetae about as thick as neurochaetae. Bidentate neurochaetae absent.
