= Eunoe hubrechti =

Scientific classification
- Kingdom: Animalia
- Phylum: Annelida
- Clade: Pleistoannelida
- Subclass: Errantia
- Order: Phyllodocida
- Family: Polynoidae
- Genus: Eunoe
- Species: E. hubrechti

Binomial name
- Eunoe hubrechti (McIntosh 1900)

Species of annelid worm

Eunoe hubrechti is a scale worm known from the Gulf of Mexico and the North Atlantic Ocean at depths of 400 to 2200m

== Description ==
Number of segments 46 (observation from Day, dubious); elytra 15 pairs. The dorsum has a madder-brown hue, with transverse elliptical markings in the middle, paler on the parapodia. Posteriorly the segments have very beautiful patterns, the madder-brown ellipse being surrounded by a pale and somewhat crenate line. The entire under surface is madder-brown, with a pale median band, and iridescent, the darker region in front showing fine metallic lustre. The parapodia are also slightly tinted of the same brownish hue, the ventral cirrus being thus rendered conspicuous, and between its base and the body a pale transverse line occurs. Anterior margin of prostomium with an acute anterior projection. Lateral antennae present. Lateral antennae inserted ventrally (beneath prostomium and median antenna). Notochaetae distinctly thicker than neurochaetae.
