= Eunoe crassa =

Scientific classification
- Kingdom: Animalia
- Phylum: Annelida
- Clade: Pleistoannelida
- Subclass: Errantia
- Order: Phyllodocida
- Family: Polynoidae
- Genus: Eunoe
- Species: E. crassa

Binomial name
- Eunoe crassa (Treadwell 1924)

Species of annelid worm

Eunoe crassa is a scale worm described from off Punta Arenas, Chile in the South Pacific Ocean.

== Description ==
Elytra 15 pairs (presumably). No distinct pigmentation pattern. Anterior margin of prostomium rounded. Lateral antennae inserted ventrally (beneath prostomium and median antenna). Notochaetae distinctly thicker than neurochaetae. Bidentate neurochaetae absent.
