= Eunoe assimilis =

Scientific classification
- Kingdom: Animalia
- Phylum: Annelida
- Clade: Pleistoannelida
- Subclass: Errantia
- Order: Phyllodocida
- Family: Polynoidae
- Genus: Eunoe
- Species: E. assimilis

Binomial name
- Eunoe assimilis McIntosh 1924

Species of annelid worm

Eunoe assimilis Eunoe assimilis is a scale worm described from Southwest of Cape Town, South Africa.

== Description ==
Number of segments 37; elytra 15 pairs. Pale with ventral cirri and outer edge of elytrae tinged with purple. Anterior margin of prostomium with an acute anterior projection. Lateral antennae inserted ventrally (beneath prostomium and median antenna). Bidentate neurochaetae absent.
