= Admetella =

Scientific classification
- Kingdom: Animalia
- Phylum: Annelida
- Clade: Pleistoannelida
- Subclass: Errantia
- Order: Phyllodocida
- Family: Polynoidae
- Genus: Admetella; McIntosh, 1885

Type species
- Polynoe (Admetella) longipedata McIntosh, 1885

Genus of annelids

Admetella is a genus of marine annelids in the family Polynoidae (scale worms). Species of Admetella, although uncommonly collected are nevertheless known from widespread localities in the Indian, Pacific and Atlantic Oceans at depths of 400–6,000 m.

== Description ==
Species of Admetella have a short triangular sheath-like appendage at the base of the lateral antennae and have 50 or more segments and 25 to 31 pairs of elytra. Notochaetae and neurochaetae are long, slender and are distally flattened.

== Species ==
Three valid species of Admetella are known as of July 2020:

- Admetella brevis Levenstein, 1978
- Admetella hastigerens Chamberlin, 1919
- Admetella longipedata (McIntosh, 1885) (Note: A binomial authority in parentheses indicates that the species was originally described in a genus other than Admetella .)
