= Admetella longipedata =

Scientific classification
- Kingdom: Animalia
- Phylum: Annelida
- Clade: Pleistoannelida
- Subclass: Errantia
- Order: Phyllodocida
- Family: Polynoidae
- Genus: Admetella
- Species: A. longipedata

Binomial name
- Admetella longipedata (McIntosh, 1885)

Species of annelid worm

Admetella longipedata is a scale worm that occurs widely in the Indian, Pacific and Atlantic Oceans at depths of 400–6,000m.

== Description ==
Admetella longipedata has 82 segments and 31 pairs of elytra. The lateral antennae are inserted terminally on anterior margin of prostomium, with auxiliary appendages at the base of the lateral antennae. Notochaetae are thinner than neurochaetae and bidentate neurochaetae are absent
