= Eunoe depressa =

Scientific classification
- Kingdom: Animalia
- Phylum: Annelida
- Clade: Pleistoannelida
- Subclass: Errantia
- Order: Phyllodocida
- Family: Polynoidae
- Genus: Eunoe
- Species: E. depressa

Binomial name
- Eunoe depressa Moore 1905

Species of annelid worm

Eunoe depressa is a scale worm known from off Alaska in the North Pacific and Arctic Oceans at depths of 35m or less.

== Description ==
Number of segments 39; elytra 15 pairs. Dorsum with brown transverse bands, especially in the first half of the body. Anterior margin of prostomium with an acute anterior projection. Lateral antennae inserted ventrally (beneath prostomium and median antenna). Notochaetae distinctly thicker than neurochaetae. Bidentate neurochaetae absent.

== Commensalism ==
E. depress is commensal. Its host taxa are hermit crabs and brachyuran crabs (Crustacea).
