= Eunoe hydroidopapillata =

Scientific classification
- Domain: Eukaryota
- Kingdom: Animalia
- Phylum: Annelida
- Clade: Pleistoannelida
- Subclass: Errantia
- Order: Phyllodocida
- Family: Polynoidae
- Genus: Eunoe
- Species: E. hydroidopapillata

Binomial name
- Eunoe hydroidopapillata Rzhavsky & Shabad 1999

Species of annelid worm

Eunoe hydroidopapillata is a scale worm described from off Kamchatka, North Pacific Ocean, at depths of 120 to 176m.

== Description ==
elytra 15 pairs (assumed). Yellow ceratophores of all antennae; styles brownish up to expanded region; yellow or brown spots near cirrophores and elytrophores. Anterior margin of prostomium rounded. Lateral antennae inserted ventrally (beneath prostomium and median antenna). Notochaetae distinctly thicker than neurochaetae. Bidentate neurochaetae absent.
