= Eunoe papillosa =

Scientific classification
- Domain: Eukaryota
- Kingdom: Animalia
- Phylum: Annelida
- Clade: Pleistoannelida
- Subclass: Errantia
- Order: Phyllodocida
- Family: Polynoidae
- Genus: Eunoe
- Species: E. papillosa

Binomial name
- Eunoe papillosa Amaral & Nonato, 1982

Species of annelid worm

Eunoe papillosa is a scale worm described from the South Atlantic Ocean off the coast of Brazil at a depths down to about 200m.

== Description ==
Number of segments 32; elytra 15 pairs (assumed). Prostomium anterior margin comprising two rounded lobes. Lateral antennae inserted ventrally (beneath prostomium and median antenna). Elytra marginal fringe of papillae present. Notochaetae thinner than neurochaetae. Bidentate neurochaetae absent.
