= Eunoe kermadeca =

Scientific classification
- Domain: Eukaryota
- Kingdom: Animalia
- Phylum: Annelida
- Clade: Pleistoannelida
- Subclass: Errantia
- Order: Phyllodocida
- Family: Polynoidae
- Genus: Eunoe
- Species: E. kermadeca

Binomial name
- Eunoe kermadeca Kirkegaard 1995

Species of annelid worm

Eunoe kermadeca is a scale worm known from the South Pacific Ocean around New Zealand at depths of 2500 to 4500m.

== Description ==
Number of segments 39; elytra 15 pairs. No distinct pigmentation pattern. Anterior margin of prostomium with an acute anterior projection. Lateral antennae inserted ventrally (beneath prostomium and median antenna). Notochaetae about as thick as neurochaetae. Bidentate neurochaetae absent.
