= Eunoe clarki =

Scientific classification
- Kingdom: Animalia
- Phylum: Annelida
- Clade: Pleistoannelida
- Subclass: Errantia
- Order: Phyllodocida
- Family: Polynoidae
- Genus: Eunoe
- Species: E. clarki

Binomial name
- Eunoe clarki Pettibone 1951

Species of annelid worm

Eunoe clarki is a scale worm described from Point Barrow, Alaska.

== Description ==
Number of segments 41; elytra 15 pairs. Middorsally transversely banded greyish green. Anterior margin of prostomium with an acute anterior projection. Lateral antennae inserted ventrally (beneath prostomium and median antenna). Notochaetae about as thick as neurochaetae. Bidentate neurochaetae absent.
