= Subadyte chesterfieldensis =

Scientific classification
- Domain: Eukaryota
- Kingdom: Animalia
- Phylum: Annelida
- Clade: Pleistoannelida
- Subclass: Errantia
- Order: Phyllodocida
- Family: Polynoidae
- Genus: Subadyte
- Species: S. chesterfieldensis

Binomial name
- Subadyte chesterfieldensis Hanley & Burke, 1991

Species of annelid worm

Subadyte chesterfieldensis is a scale worm known from the Coral Sea from a depths of about 55 m.

== Description ==
Subadyte chesterfieldensis is a short-bodied worm with about 35 segments and 15 pairs of elytra, with no colour patterning. The prostomium bears a pair acute anterior projections along the anterior margin, and the lateral antennae are positioned ventrally on it, directly beneath median antenna ceratophore. The notochaetae are about as thick as the neurochaetae, which also possess bidentate tips.
