= Eunoe subtruncata =

Scientific classification
- Domain: Eukaryota
- Kingdom: Animalia
- Phylum: Annelida
- Clade: Pleistoannelida
- Subclass: Errantia
- Order: Phyllodocida
- Family: Polynoidae
- Genus: Eunoe
- Species: E. subtruncata

Binomial name
- Eunoe subtruncata Annenkova, 1937

Species of annelid worm

Eunoe subtruncata is a scale worm described from the Sea of Japan.

== Description ==
Number of segments 42–45; elytra 15 pairs. Prostomium anterior margin comprising two rounded lobes. Lateral antennae inserted ventrally (beneath prostomium and median antenna). Elytra marginal fringe of papillae present. Notochaetae distinctly thicker than neurochaetae. Bidentate neurochaetae absent.
