= Gattyana mossambica =

Scientific classification
- Domain: Eukaryota
- Kingdom: Animalia
- Phylum: Annelida
- Clade: Pleistoannelida
- Subclass: Errantia
- Order: Phyllodocida
- Family: Polynoidae
- Genus: Gattyana
- Species: G. mossambica

Binomial name
- Gattyana mossambica Day, 1962

Species of annelid worm

Gattyana mossambica is a scale worm described from the Indian Ocean off Mozambique.

== Description ==
Gattyana mossambica is a short-bodied worm with 45 segments and 15 pairs of elytra, which bear a marginal fringe of papillae. The lateral antennae are positioned ventrally on the prostomium, directly beneath the median antenna. A pair of anterior projections are present on the anterior margin of the prostomium also. Notochaetae are thinner than the neurochaetae, and the neurochaetae bear bidentate tips, which contradicts the diagnosis of the genus.

== Biology and Ecology ==
Gattyana mossambica has been collected from the tubes of Eunice tubifex but it is not clear if this represents a commensal relationship.
