= Gattyana amondseni =

Scientific classification
- Kingdom: Animalia
- Phylum: Annelida
- Clade: Pleistoannelida
- Subclass: Errantia
- Order: Phyllodocida
- Family: Polynoidae
- Genus: Gattyana
- Species: G. amondseni

Binomial name
- Gattyana amondseni (Malmgren, 1867)

Species of annelid worm

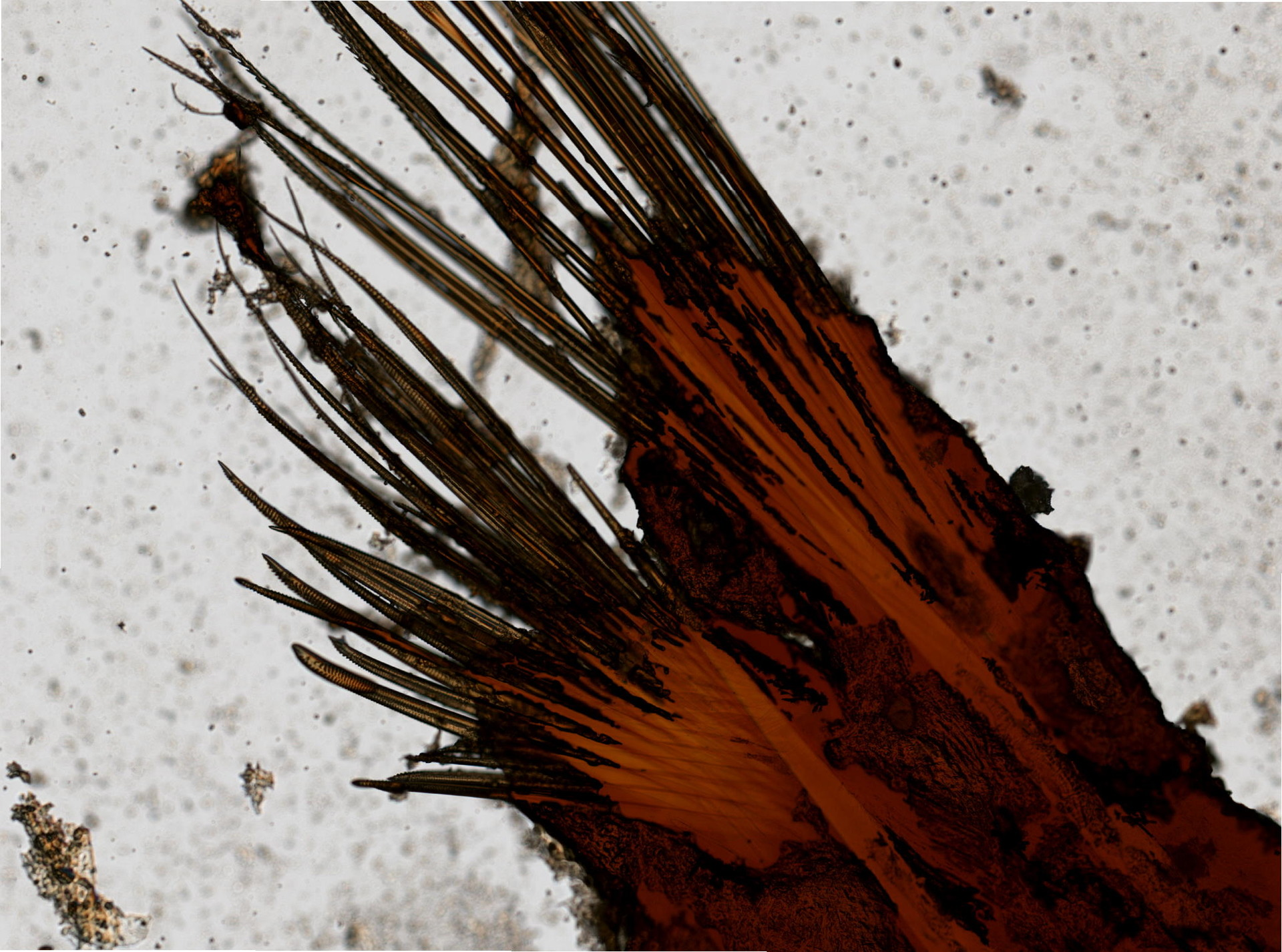
Preserved Gattyana amondseni specimen

Gattyana amondseni is a scale worm described from the Arctic and North Atlantic Oceans at depths down to about 700 m.

== Description ==
Gattyana amondseni is a short-bodied worm with 38 segments and 15 pairs of elytra, which bear a marginal fringe of papillae. The lateral antennae are positioned ventrally on the prostomium, directly beneath the median antenna. Notochaetae are about as thick and sometimes thinner than the neurochaetae.
