= Eunoe hartmanae =

Scientific classification
- Kingdom: Animalia
- Phylum: Annelida
- Clade: Pleistoannelida
- Subclass: Errantia
- Order: Phyllodocida
- Family: Polynoidae
- Genus: Eunoe
- Species: E. hartmanae

Binomial name
- Eunoe hartmanae (Uschakov 1962)

Species of annelid worm

Eunoe hartmanae is a scale worm described from the Davis Sea, Antarctica at depths of 160–540 m.

== Description ==
Number of segments 39; elytra 15 pairs. Dorsum dark grey with two slender white lines; ventrum not pigmented. Anterior margin of prostomium with an acute anterior projection. Lateral antennae inserted ventrally (beneath prostomium and median antenna). Notochaetae about as thick as neurochaetae. Bidentate neurochaetae present.
