= Eunoe nodulosa =

Scientific classification
- Domain: Eukaryota
- Kingdom: Animalia
- Phylum: Annelida
- Clade: Pleistoannelida
- Subclass: Errantia
- Order: Phyllodocida
- Family: Polynoidae
- Genus: Eunoe
- Species: E. nodulosa

Binomial name
- Eunoe nodulosa Day, 1967

Species of annelid worm

Eunoe nodulosa is a scale worm described from Saldanha Bay on the Western Cape, South Africa from intertidal depths.

== Description ==
Number of segments 45; elytra 15 pairs. No distinct pigmentation pattern. prostomium anterior margin comprising two rounded lobes. Lateral antennae inserted ventrally (beneath prostomium and median antenna). elytra marginal fringe of papillae present. Notochaetae about as thick as neurochaetae. Bidentate neurochaetae absent.
