= Eunoe uniseriata =

Scientific classification
- Domain: Eukaryota
- Kingdom: Animalia
- Phylum: Annelida
- Clade: Pleistoannelida
- Subclass: Errantia
- Order: Phyllodocida
- Family: Polynoidae
- Genus: Eunoe
- Species: E. uniseriata

Binomial name
- Eunoe uniseriata Banse & Hobson 1968

Species of annelid worm

Eunoe uniseriata is a scale worm described from Puget Sound in Washington (state) in the US at a depths of about 70–200m.

== Description ==
Number of segments 38; elytra 15 pairs. No distinct pigmentation pattern. Prostomium anterior margin comprising a pair of acute anterior projections. Lateral antennae inserted ventrally (beneath Prostomium and median antenna). elytra marginal fringe of papillae present. Notochaetae distinctly thicker than neurochaetae. Bidentate neurochaetae absent.
