= Eunoe alvinella =

Scientific classification
- Kingdom: Animalia
- Phylum: Annelida
- Clade: Pleistoannelida
- Subclass: Errantia
- Order: Phyllodocida
- Family: Polynoidae
- Genus: Eunoe
- Species: E. alvinella

Binomial name
- Eunoe alvinella Pettibone, 1989

Species of annelid worm

Eunoe alvinella is a scale worm described from a specimen collected at a depth of 2725 m on the East Pacific Rise.

== Description ==
Number of segments 34; elytra 15 pairs. No distinct pigmentation pattern. Anterior margin of prostomium rounded. Lateral antennae inserted ventrally (beneath prostomium and median antenna). Notochaetae distinctly thicker than neurochaetae. Bidentate neurochaetae absent.
