= Eunoe campbellica =

Scientific classification
- Domain: Eukaryota
- Kingdom: Animalia
- Phylum: Annelida
- Clade: Pleistoannelida
- Subclass: Errantia
- Order: Phyllodocida
- Family: Polynoidae
- Genus: Eunoe
- Species: E. campbellica

Binomial name
- Eunoe campbellica Averincev 1978

Species of annelid

Eunoe campbellica is a scale worm described from off the south of Campbell Island, New Zealand in the South Pacific Ocean, at a depths of 570 m.

== Description ==
Elytra 15 pairs. No distinct pigmentation pattern. Anterior margin of prostomium with an acute anterior projection. Lateral antennae inserted ventrally (beneath prostomium and median antenna). Notochaetae distinctly thicker than neurochaetae. Bidentate neurochaetae absent.
