= Eunoe papillaris =

Scientific classification
- Domain: Eukaryota
- Kingdom: Animalia
- Phylum: Annelida
- Clade: Pleistoannelida
- Subclass: Errantia
- Order: Phyllodocida
- Family: Polynoidae
- Genus: Eunoe
- Species: E. papillaris

Binomial name
- Eunoe papillaris Averincev, 1978

Species of annelid worm

Eunoe papillaris is a scale worm described from south of Tasmania in the Southern Ocean at a depths of about 1600m.

== Description ==
Number of segments 37; elytra 15 pairs. Dorsum light, yellowish; ventrum centrally brown, parapodial and cirral tips purple. Prostomium anterior margin comprising a pair of acute anterior projections. Lateral antennae inserted ventrally (beneath prostomium and median antenna). Notochaetae about as thick as neurochaetae. Bidentate neurochaetae absent.
