= Admetella brevis =

Scientific classification
- Domain: Eukaryota
- Kingdom: Animalia
- Phylum: Annelida
- Clade: Pleistoannelida
- Subclass: Errantia
- Order: Phyllodocida
- Family: Polynoidae
- Genus: Admetella
- Species: A. brevis

Binomial name
- Admetella brevis Levenstein, 1978

Species of annelid worm

Admetella brevis is a scale worm known from the Hjort Trench in the south-west Pacific Ocean at a depth of 5760m.

== Description ==
Admetella brevis has 50 segments and 20 pairs of elytra, with light beige body pigmentation. The lateral antennae are inserted ventrally (beneath prostomium and median antenna), with auxiliary appendages at base of lateral antennae present. Bidentate neurochaetae are absent.
