= Subadyte =

Scientific classification
- Kingdom: Animalia
- Phylum: Annelida
- Clade: Pleistoannelida
- Subclass: Errantia
- Order: Phyllodocida
- Family: Polynoidae
- Genus: Subadyte; Pettibone, 1969

Type species
- Polynoe pellucida Ehlers, 1864, accepted as Subadyte pellucida (Ehlers, 1864)

Genus of annelid worms

Subadyte is a genus of marine polychaete worms belonging to the family Polynoidae, the scaleworms. Eight species of Subadyte are recognised and the genus is known to occur widely in the world's oceans from the intertidal zone to depths of about 1200 m.

== Description ==
Subadyte are short-bodied worms with around 35–41 segments and 15–16 pairs of elytra. The lateral antennae are positioned ventrally on the prostomium, directly beneath the median antenna and the neurochaetae bear bidentate tips.

== Species ==
As at October 2020 Subadyte contains eight species:

- Subadyte albanyensis Hanley & Burke, 1990
- Subadyte campechensis Barnich, Beuck & Freiwald, 2013
- Subadyte chesterfieldensis Hanley & Burke, 1991
- Subadyte mexicana Fauchald, 1972
- Subadyte micropapillata Barnich, Sun & Fiege, 2004
- Subadyte mjoebergi (Augener, 1922)
- Subadyte papillifera (Horst, 1915)
- Subadyte pellucida (Ehlers, 1864)
