= Eunoe laetmogonensis =

Scientific classification
- Domain: Eukaryota
- Kingdom: Animalia
- Phylum: Annelida
- Clade: Pleistoannelida
- Subclass: Errantia
- Order: Phyllodocida
- Family: Polynoidae
- Genus: Eunoe
- Species: E. laetmogonensis

Binomial name
- Eunoe laetmogonensis Kirkegaard & Billett, 1980

Species of annelid worm

Eunoe laetmogonensis is a scale worm known from the north-east Atlantic Ocean at depths of about 800 to 2300 m.

== Description ==
Number of segments 37; elytra 15 pairs. Dorsal surface deep blue (becomes dark brown in alcohol). Prostomium anterior margin comprising a pair of acute anterior projections. Lateral antennae inserted ventrally (beneath prostomium and median antenna). Notochaetae about as thick as neurochaetae. Bidentate neurochaetae absent.

== Commensalism ==
E. laetmogonensis is commensal; its host taxon is the sea cucumber, Laetmogone violacea.
