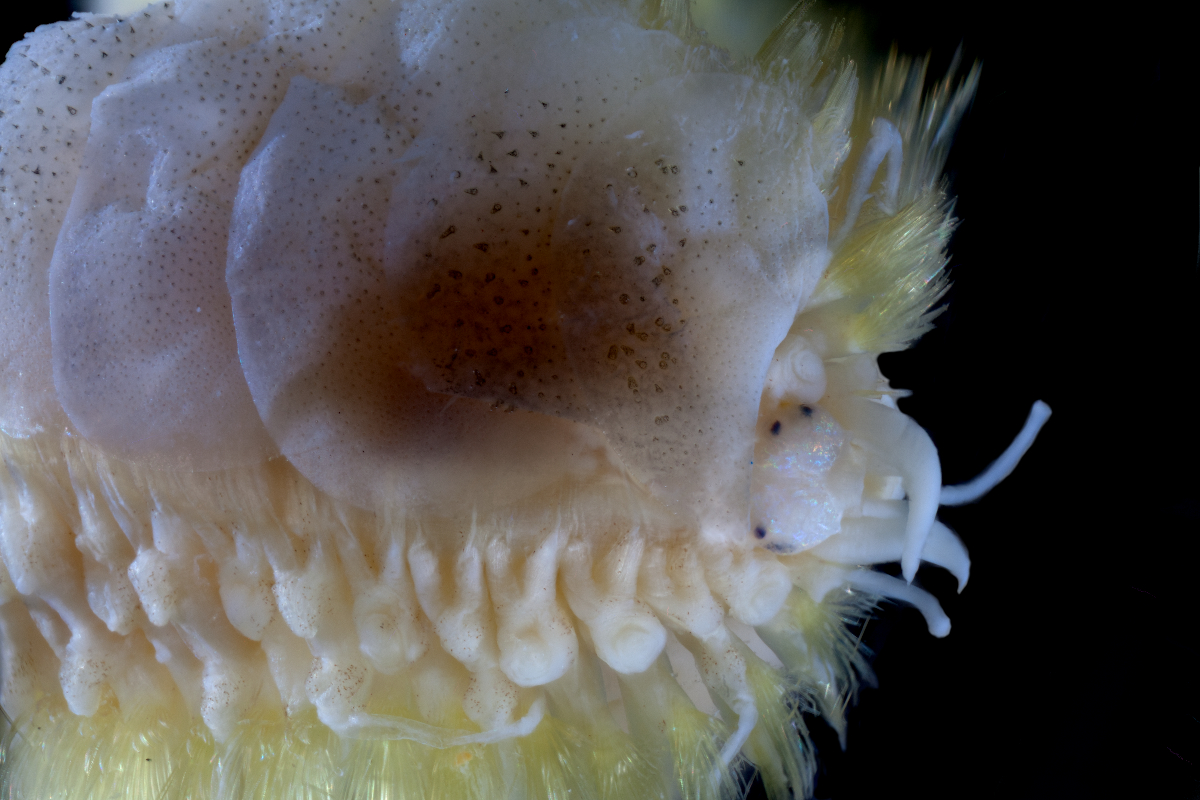
- Anterior and prostomium region of a Eunoe etheridgei specimen from Museums Victoria

Scientific classification
- Domain: Eukaryota
- Kingdom: Animalia
- Phylum: Annelida
- Clade: Pleistoannelida
- Subclass: Errantia
- Order: Phyllodocida
- Family: Polynoidae
- Genus: Eunoe
- Species: E. etheridgei

Binomial name
- Eunoe etheridgei (Benham 1915)

= Eunoe etheridgei =

Species of annelid worm

Eunoe etheridgei is a scale worm known from off south-eastern Australia at depths of about 400 m.

== Description ==
Number of segments 37–38; elytra 15 pairs. No distinct pigmentation pattern. Anterior margin of prostomium with an acute anterior projection. Lateral antennae inserted ventrally (beneath prostomium and median antenna). Notochaetae distinctly thicker than neurochaetae. Bidentate neurochaetae absent.
