= Subadyte pellucida =

Scientific classification
- Kingdom: Animalia
- Phylum: Annelida
- Clade: Pleistoannelida
- Subclass: Errantia
- Order: Phyllodocida
- Family: Polynoidae
- Genus: Subadyte
- Species: S. pellucida

Binomial name
- Subadyte pellucida (Ehlers, 1864)

Species of annelid worm

Subadyte pellucida is a scale worm widely reported from the Indian, Pacific and North Atlantic Oceans from the intertidal zone to depths of about 800 m.

== Description ==
Subadyte pellucida is a short-bodied worm with about 40 segments and 15 pairs of elytra, which bear a marginal fringe of papillae. The lateral antennae are positioned ventrally on the prostomium, directly beneath median antenna ceratophore. The notochaetae are about as thick as the neurochaetae, which also possess bidentate tips.

== Biology and ecology ==
Subadyte pellucida is a commensal organism, living on host brittle stars and sea stars, but can also be free-living.
