= Eunoe brunnea =

Scientific classification
- Kingdom: Animalia
- Phylum: Annelida
- Clade: Pleistoannelida
- Subclass: Errantia
- Order: Phyllodocida
- Family: Polynoidae
- Genus: Eunoe
- Species: E. brunnea

Binomial name
- Eunoe brunnea Hartman 1978

Species of annelid worm

Eunoe brunnea is a scale worm known from the Weddell Sea, Antarctica at depths of about 2000–4000 m.

== Description ==
Elytra 15 pairs (presumably). Brown transverse bands on each segment. Anterior margin of prostomium with an acute anterior projection. Lateral antennae inserted ventrally (beneath prostomium and median antenna). Notochaetae distinctly thicker than neurochaetae. Bidentate neurochaetae absent.
