= Eunoe ivantsovi =

Scientific classification
- Domain: Eukaryota
- Kingdom: Animalia
- Phylum: Annelida
- Clade: Pleistoannelida
- Subclass: Errantia
- Order: Phyllodocida
- Family: Polynoidae
- Genus: Eunoe
- Species: E. ivantsovi

Binomial name
- Eunoe ivantsovi Averincev 1978

Species of annelid worm

Eunoe ivantsovi is a scale worm known from the Tasman Sea off Lord Howe Island at a depth of 1640m.

== Description ==
Number of segments 33; Elytra 15 pairs. Transverse scattered tiny pigment spots in narrow anterior band on each segment. Anterior margin of prostomium with an acute anterior projection. Lateral antennae inserted ventrally (beneath prostomium and median antenna). Notochaetae thinner than neurochaetae. Bidentate neurochaetae absent.
