= Gattyana pacifica =

Scientific classification
- Domain: Eukaryota
- Kingdom: Animalia
- Phylum: Annelida
- Clade: Pleistoannelida
- Subclass: Errantia
- Order: Phyllodocida
- Family: Polynoidae
- Genus: Gattyana
- Species: G. pacifica

Binomial name
- Gattyana pacifica (Johnson, 1901)

Species of annelid worm

Gattyana pacifica is a scale worm described from Puget Sound in the north-west Pacific, probably from the intertidal zone.

== Description ==
Gattyana australis is a short-bodied worm with 37 segments and 15 pairs of elytra. The prostomium bears a pair of acute anterior projections on its anterior margin. Lateral antennae are positioned ventrally on the prostomium, directly beneath the median antenna. Notochaetae are thinner than the neurochaetae, and the neurochaetae bear bidentate tips, which contradicts the diagnosis of the genus.
