= Eunoe serrata =

Scientific classification
- Domain: Eukaryota
- Kingdom: Animalia
- Phylum: Annelida
- Clade: Pleistoannelida
- Subclass: Errantia
- Order: Phyllodocida
- Family: Polynoidae
- Genus: Eunoe
- Species: E. serrata

Binomial name
- Eunoe serrata Amaral & Nonato, 1982

Species of annelid worm

Eunoe serrata is a scale worm described from the South Atlantic Ocean off the coast of Brazil at depths down to about 200m.

== Description ==
Number of segments 30; elytra 15 pairs. Prostomium anterior margin comprising a pair of acute anterior projections. Lateral antennae inserted ventrally (beneath prostomium and median antenna). Notochaetae distinctly thicker than neurochaetae. Bidentate neurochaetae absent.
