= Gattyana cirrhosa =

Scientific classification
- Kingdom: Animalia
- Phylum: Annelida
- Clade: Pleistoannelida
- Subclass: Errantia
- Order: Phyllodocida
- Family: Polynoidae
- Genus: Gattyana
- Species: G. cirrhosa

Binomial name
- Gattyana cirrhosa (Pallas, 1766)

Species of annelid worm

Gattyana cirrhosa is a species of scale worm in the family Polynoidae. It is known from widespread locations in the North Atlantic, Arctic, and northwestern Pacific ocean, from the intertidal zone at depths of at least 1,200 m (3,900 ft).

== Description ==
Gattyana cirrhosa is a short-bodied worm with 38 segments and 15 pairs of elytra, which bear a marginal fringe of papillae and are a rich brassy-orange colour. The lateral antennae are positioned ventrally on the prostomium, directly beneath the median antenna. Notochaetae are about as thick as or thinner than the neurochaetae.

== Biology and ecology ==
Gattyana cirrhosa has a commensal relationship with chaetopterid, terebellid, and pectinariid polychaete worms, living within the tubes they construct. However, it is also a free-living taxon.
