= Eunoe anderssoni =

Scientific classification
- Domain: Eukaryota
- Kingdom: Animalia
- Phylum: Annelida
- Clade: Pleistoannelida
- Subclass: Errantia
- Order: Phyllodocida
- Family: Polynoidae
- Genus: Eunoe
- Species: E. anderssoni

Binomial name
- Eunoe anderssoni (Bergström 1916)

Species of annelid worm

Eunoe anderssoni is a scale worm described from the Antarctic Ocean off South Georgia at depths of about 300–500 m.

== Description ==
Number of segments 34; elytra 15 pairs. Light brownish grey, darker from about segment 11; prostomium white. Anterior margin of prostomium with an acute anterior projection. Lateral antennae inserted ventrally (beneath prostomium and median antenna). Notochaetae distinctly thicker than neurochaetae. Bidentate neurochaetae absent.
