= Subadyte campechensis =

Scientific classification
- Domain: Eukaryota
- Kingdom: Animalia
- Phylum: Annelida
- Clade: Pleistoannelida
- Subclass: Errantia
- Order: Phyllodocida
- Family: Polynoidae
- Genus: Subadyte
- Species: S. campechensis

Binomial name
- Subadyte campechensis Barnich, Beuck & Freiwald, 2013

Species of annelid worm

Subadyte campechensis is a scale worm known from a single specimen collected in the Gulf of Mexico at a depth of 640 m.

== Description ==
The single specimen is fragmentary making the total number of segments unknown, but is presumably short-bodied with 15 pairs of elytra. The species is rather transparent, except for some brownish pigment on ceratophores of antennae, yellow and brownish pigmentation on dorsum and dark pharynx. The lateral antennae are positioned ventrally on prostomium, directly beneath median antenna ceratophore. The notochaetae are distinctly thicker than the neurochaetae, which also possess bidentate tips.
