= Eunoe sentiformis =

Scientific classification
- Kingdom: Animalia
- Phylum: Annelida
- Clade: Pleistoannelida
- Subclass: Errantia
- Order: Phyllodocida
- Family: Polynoidae
- Genus: Eunoe
- Species: E. sentiformis

Binomial name
- Eunoe sentiformis Uschakov, 1958

Species of annelid worm

Eunoe sentiformis is a scale worm described from the East Siberian Sea in the Arctic Ocean.

== Description ==
The worm has 36 segments: elytra 15 pairs. Its dorsum is scattered with brownish pigment.

It has a prostomium anterior margin comprising two rounded lobes. Its lateral antennae is inserted ventrally (beneath prostomium and median antenna).

It has a notochaetae that is about as thick as neurochaetae. Its bidentate neurochaetae is absent.
