= Gattyana pohaiensis =

Scientific classification
- Kingdom: Animalia
- Phylum: Annelida
- Clade: Pleistoannelida
- Subclass: Errantia
- Order: Phyllodocida
- Family: Polynoidae
- Genus: Gattyana
- Species: G. pohaiensis

Binomial name
- Gattyana pohaiensis Uschakov & Wu, 1959

Species of annelid worm

Gattyana pohaiensis is a scale worm described from the Yellow Sea at depth down to 26 m.

== Description ==
Gattyana pohaiensis is a short-bodied worm with 36 segments and 15 pairs of elytra, which bear a marginal fringe of papillae. It is pigmented with dark gray or greenish transverse bands on every segment. Lateral antennae are positioned ventrally on the prostomium, directly beneath the median antenna. Notochaetae are thinner than the neurochaetae, and the neurochaetae bear bidentate tips, which contradicts the diagnosis of the genus.
