= Eunoe eura =

Scientific classification
- Kingdom: Animalia
- Phylum: Annelida
- Clade: Pleistoannelida
- Subclass: Errantia
- Order: Phyllodocida
- Family: Polynoidae
- Genus: Eunoe
- Species: E. eura

Binomial name
- Eunoe eura Chamberlin 1919

Species of annelid worm

Eunoe eura is a scale worm described from off Peru in the South Pacific Ocean at a depth of 550 m.

== Description ==
Number of segments 35; elytra 15 pairs. Brownish with greenish cast and with lighter, yellowish parapodia. Anterior margin of prostomium rounded. Lateral antennae inserted ventrally (beneath prostomium and median antenna). Notochaetae thinner than neurochaetae. Bidentate neurochaetae absent.
