= Gattyana ciliata =

Scientific classification
- Kingdom: Animalia
- Phylum: Annelida
- Clade: Pleistoannelida
- Subclass: Errantia
- Order: Phyllodocida
- Family: Polynoidae
- Genus: Gattyana
- Species: G. ciliata

Binomial name
- Gattyana ciliata Moore, 1902

Species of annelid worm

Gattyana ciliata is a scale worm which occurs in the north-west Pacific Ocean from depths down to at least 240 m.

== Description ==
Gattyana ciliata is a short-bodied worm with 37 segments and 15 pairs of elytra, which bear a marginal fringe of papillae. The lateral antennae are positioned ventrally on the prostomium, directly beneath the median antenna. Notochaetae are thinner than the neurochaetae.
