= Subadyte papillifera =

Scientific classification
- Kingdom: Animalia
- Phylum: Annelida
- Clade: Pleistoannelida
- Subclass: Errantia
- Order: Phyllodocida
- Family: Polynoidae
- Genus: Subadyte
- Species: S. papillifera

Binomial name
- Subadyte papillifera (Horst, 1915)

Species of annelid worm

Subadyte papillifera is a scale worm known from the shores of northern Australia and Papua New Guinea from the intertidal zone to depths of about 26 m.

== Description ==
Subadyte papillifera is a short-bodied worm with about 39 segments and 15-16 pairs of elytra. The body is a light tan colour with darker mottling on dorsum, with the prostomium also light tan and antennae with slight mottling of darker pigment on inflated tips. The prostomium bears a pair of anterior projections on the anterior margin and the lateral antennae are positioned ventrally on it, directly beneath median antenna ceratophore. The notochaetae are about as thick as the neurochaetae, which also possess bidentate tips.

== Biology and ecology ==
Subadyte papillifera is a commensal organism, living on host corals.
