= Neopolynoe chondrocladiae =

Scientific classification
- Kingdom: Animalia
- Phylum: Annelida
- Clade: Pleistoannelida
- Subclass: Errantia
- Order: Phyllodocida
- Family: Polynoidae
- Genus: Neopolynoe
- Species: N. chondrocladiae

Binomial name
- Neopolynoe chondrocladiae (Fauvel, 1943)

Species of annelid worm

Neopolynoe chondrocladiae is a scale worm known from the north-east Atlantic Ocean at depths of about 700 to 2500 m.

== Description ==
Neopolynoe chondrocladiae can have up to around 94 segments with 15 pairs of elytra that bear a marginal fringe of papillae. The lateral antennae are inserted ventrally to prostomium, directly beneath the median antenna. The notochaetae are distinctly thicker than the neurochaetae and possess only simple tips.

== Biology ==
Neopolynoe chondrocladiae has an obligate symbiotic relationship with the sponges Chondrocladia robertballardi and Chondrocladia virgata. The nature of the symbiotic relationship has been debated, but a 2021 study using a multidisciplinary approach suggested that the relationship is mutualistic, proposing that Neopolynoe chondrocladiae may use bioluminescence as a lure for prey which is consumed by both the worm and its sponge hosts.
