= Subadyte mjoebergi =

Scientific classification
- Domain: Eukaryota
- Kingdom: Animalia
- Phylum: Annelida
- Clade: Pleistoannelida
- Subclass: Errantia
- Order: Phyllodocida
- Family: Polynoidae
- Genus: Subadyte
- Species: S. mjoebergi

Binomial name
- Subadyte mjoebergi (Augener, 1922)

Species of annelid worm

Subadyte mjoebergi is a scale worm known from a single specimen collected in the Indian Ocean off the coast of north-western Australia at a depth of 22 m.

== Description ==
Subadyte mjoebergi is a short-bodied worm with about 41 segments and 16 pairs of elytra. The prostomium bears a pair of anterior projections on the anterior margin and the lateral antennae are positioned ventrally on it, directly beneath median antenna ceratophore. The notochaetae are about as thick as the neurochaetae, which also possess bidentate tips.
