= Eunoe spinosa =

Scientific classification
- Kingdom: Animalia
- Phylum: Annelida
- Clade: Pleistoannelida
- Subclass: Errantia
- Order: Phyllodocida
- Family: Polynoidae
- Genus: Eunoe
- Species: E. spinosa

Binomial name
- Eunoe spinosa Imajima, 1997

Species of annelid

Eunoe spinosa is a scale worm described from the Sagami Sea, Japan at depths of about 80–100m.

== Description ==
Number of segments 38; elytra 15 pairs. No distinct pigmentation pattern. Prostomium anterior margin comprising a pair of acute anterior projections. Lateral antennae inserted ventrally (beneath prostomium and median antenna). Elytra marginal fringe of papillae present. Notochaetae about as thick as neurochaetae. Bidentate neurochaetae absent.
