= Eunoe hozawai =

Scientific classification
- Domain: Eukaryota
- Kingdom: Animalia
- Phylum: Annelida
- Clade: Pleistoannelida
- Subclass: Errantia
- Order: Phyllodocida
- Family: Polynoidae
- Genus: Eunoe
- Species: E. hozawai

Binomial name
- Eunoe hozawai Okuda 1939

Species of annelid worm

Eunoe hozawai is a scale worm described from Japan, North Pacific Ocean.

== description ==
Number of segments 40; elytra 15 pairs. Anterior margin of prostomium rounded. Lateral antennae inserted ventrally (beneath prostomium and median antenna). Notochaetae about as thick as neurochaetae. Bidentate neurochaetae absent.
