= Admetella hastigerens =

Scientific classification
- Kingdom: Animalia
- Phylum: Annelida
- Clade: Pleistoannelida
- Subclass: Errantia
- Order: Phyllodocida
- Family: Polynoidae
- Genus: Admetella
- Species: A. hastigerens

Binomial name
- Admetella hastigerens Chamberlin, 1919

Species of annelid worm

Admetella hastigerens is a scale worm known from the east Pacific Ocean at depths of about 1000–1200m.

== Description ==
Admetella hastigerens has 70 segments and 27 pairs of elytra, with grayish yellow pigmentation (in preserved specimens). The lateral antennae are inserted terminally on anterior margin of the prostomium, with auxiliary appendages at base of lateral antennae. Bidentate neurochaetae are present
