= Subadyte albanyensis =

Scientific classification
- Kingdom: Animalia
- Phylum: Annelida
- Clade: Pleistoannelida
- Subclass: Errantia
- Order: Phyllodocida
- Family: Polynoidae
- Genus: Subadyte
- Species: S. albanyensis

Binomial name
- Subadyte albanyensis Hanley & Burke, 1990

Species of annelid worm

Subadyte albanyensis is a scale worm known from the shores of southern Australia from the intertidal to a depth of about 15 m.

== Description ==
Subadyte albanyensis is a short-bodied worm with about 37 segments and 15 pairs of elytra that bear a marginal fringe of papillae, and patches of greenish brown pigment around bases of elytrhophores and cirrophores with pigmentation extending over dorsum from segment 4. Ventrum with two small patches of greenish brown pigment on either side of midline starting at segment 6. Lateral antennae positioned ventrally on prostomium, directly beneath median antenna ceratophore. The notochaetae are about as thick as neurochaetae, which also possess bidentate tips.

== Biology ==
Subadyte albanyensis is a commensal species, which is associated with seagrass and sponges.
