= Eunoe pallida =

Scientific classification
- Kingdom: Animalia
- Phylum: Annelida
- Clade: Pleistoannelida
- Subclass: Errantia
- Order: Phyllodocida
- Family: Polynoidae
- Genus: Eunoe
- Species: E. pallida

Binomial name
- Eunoe pallida (Ehlers, 1908)

Species of annelid worm

Eunoe pallida is a scale worm known from the Indian Ocean, in the Persian Gulf, Andaman Sea, and off Nias, Sumatra at a depths of 45–614m.

== Description ==
Number of segments 37; elytra 15–16 pairs. No distinct pigmentation pattern. prostomium anterior margin comprising a pair of acute anterior projections. Lateral antennae inserted ventrally (beneath prostomium and median antenna). Notochaetae distinctly thicker than neurochaetae. Bidentate neurochaetae absent.

== Commensalism ==
E. pallida is commensal; its host taxa are sea stars and possibly sea cucumbers.
