= Neopolynoe paradoxa =

Scientific classification
- Domain: Eukaryota
- Kingdom: Animalia
- Phylum: Annelida
- Clade: Pleistoannelida
- Subclass: Errantia
- Order: Phyllodocida
- Family: Polynoidae
- Genus: Neopolynoe
- Species: N. paradoxa

Binomial name
- Neopolynoe paradoxa (Anon, 1888)

Species of annelid worm

Neopolynoe paradoxa is a scale worm known from the North Atlantic Ocean around Norway at depths of about 70 to 1000 m.

== Description ==
Neopolynoe paradoxa has up to 60 segments with 15 pairs of elytra that bear marginal fringe of papillae. Lateral antennae are positioned ventrally on the prostomium, directly beneath the median antenna ceratophore and almost obscured in dorsal view. The notochaetae are distinctly thicker than the neurochaetae and only possess simple tips.

== Biology ==
Neopolynoe paradoxa has a commensal relationship with host corals.
