= Neopolynoe =

Scientific classification
- Domain: Eukaryota
- Kingdom: Animalia
- Phylum: Annelida
- Clade: Pleistoannelida
- Subclass: Errantia
- Order: Phyllodocida
- Family: Polynoidae
- Genus: Neopolynoe; Loshamn, 1981

Type species
- Neopolynoe paradoxa (Anon, 1888)

Genus of annelid worms

Neopolynoe is a genus of marine polychaete worms belonging to the family Polynoidae, the scaleworms. Neopolynoe contains 4 species, all known from the Atlantic Ocean from shallow water to depths of about 2500 m.

== Description ==
Species of Neopolynoe are long-bodied scale worms with about 60–105 segments and 15 pairs of elytra. The bilobed prostomium has a pair of cephalic peaks present and the lateral antennae are inserted ventrally beneath the median antenna. The neuropodial lobe is elongate and tapering. The ornamented notochaetae are thicker than or about as thick as the neurochaetae. Two kinds of neurochaetae may be present: with simple blunt tips or with bidentate tips.

== Species ==
As at October 2020, Neopolynoe contains four species:

- Neopolynoe acanellae (Verrill, 1882)
- Neopolynoe antarctica (Kinberg, 1858)
- Neopolynoe chondrocladiae (Fauvel, 1943)
- Neopolynoe paradoxa (Anon, 1888)
