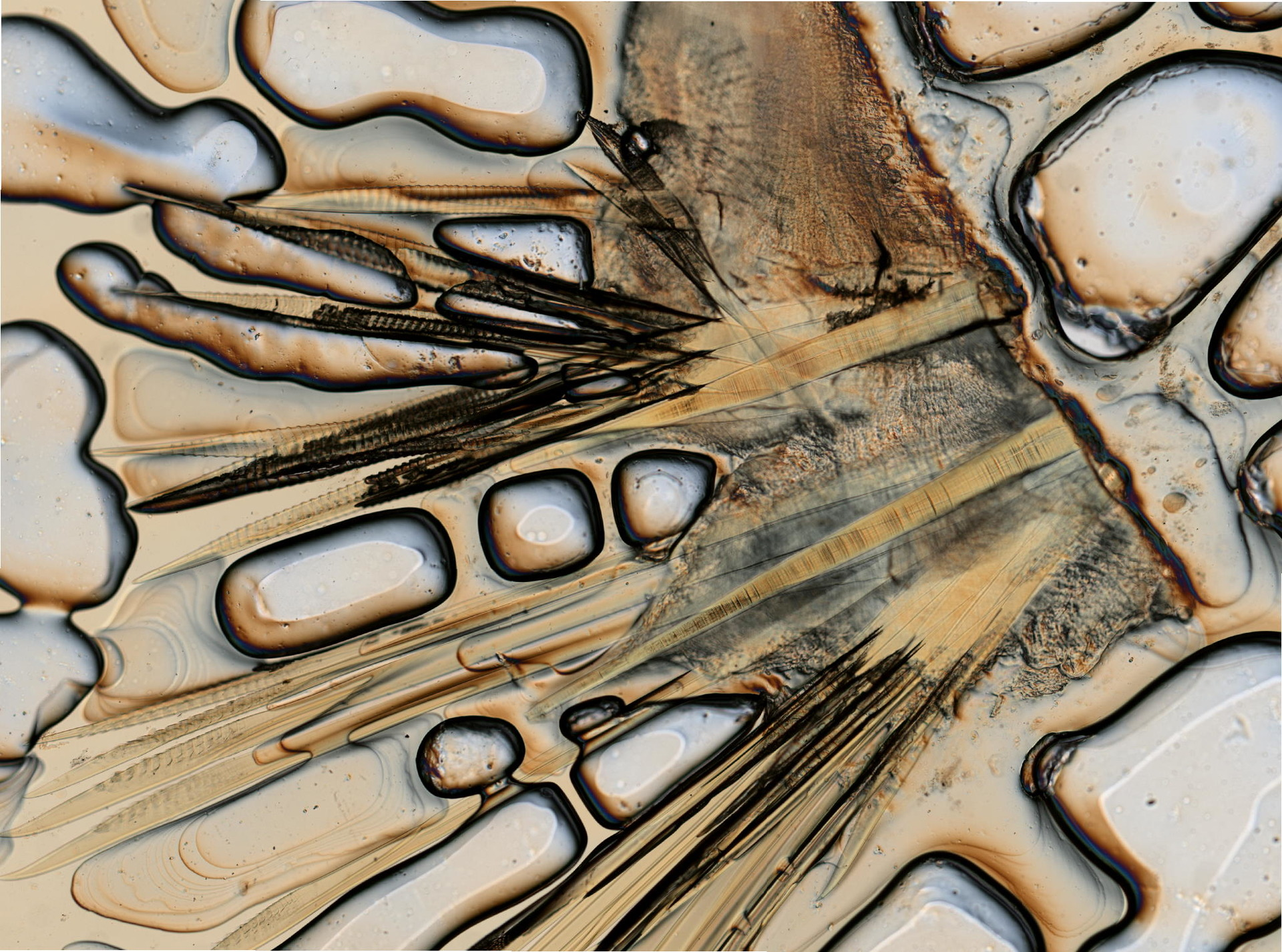
- Neopolynoe acanellae

Scientific classification
- Kingdom: Animalia
- Phylum: Annelida
- Clade: Pleistoannelida
- Subclass: Errantia
- Order: Phyllodocida
- Family: Polynoidae
- Genus: Neopolynoe
- Species: N. acanellae

Binomial name
- Neopolynoe acanellae (Verrill, 1882)

= Neopolynoe acanellae =

Species of annelid worm

Neopolynoe acanellae is a scale worm known from the North Atlantic Ocean at depths about 400 to 2000 m.

== Description ==
Neopolynoe acanellae has up to 72 segments with 15 pairs of elytra that bear marginal fringe of papillae but no color patterning. Lateral antennae are positioned ventrally on the prostomium, directly beneath the median antenna ceratophore and almost obscured in dorsal view. The notochaetae are about as thick as neurochaetae and only possess simple tips.

== Biology ==
Neopolynoe acanellae has a commensal relationship with host corals of the genus Anthomastus and Acanella, as well as with sponges.
