= Subadyte mexicana =

Scientific classification
- Domain: Eukaryota
- Kingdom: Animalia
- Phylum: Annelida
- Clade: Pleistoannelida
- Subclass: Errantia
- Order: Phyllodocida
- Family: Polynoidae
- Genus: Subadyte
- Species: S. mexicana

Binomial name
- Subadyte mexicana Fauchald, 1972

Species of annelid worm

Subadyte mexicana is a scale worm known from the north-east Pacific Ocean offshore from Baja California from depths of 567–844 m.

== Description ==
Subadyte mexicana is a brown, short-bodied worm with 15 pairs of elytra. The prostomium bears a pair of anterior projections on the anterior margin and the lateral antennae are positioned ventrally on it, directly beneath median antenna ceratophore. The notochaetae are distinctly thicker than the neurochaetae, which also possess bidentate tips.
