= Eunoe rhizoicola =

Scientific classification
- Domain: Eukaryota
- Kingdom: Animalia
- Phylum: Annelida
- Clade: Pleistoannelida
- Subclass: Errantia
- Order: Phyllodocida
- Family: Polynoidae
- Genus: Eunoe
- Species: E. rhizoicola

Binomial name
- Eunoe rhizoicola Hartmann-Schröder, 1962

Species of annelid worm

Eunoe rhizoicola is a scale worm described from Punta Arenas, Chile, at a depth of 4m.

== Description ==
Number of segments 36; elytra 15 pairs. Dirty yellowish green (in formalin). Prostomium anterior margin comprising a pair of acute anterior projections. Lateral antennae inserted ventrally (beneath prostomium and median antenna). Elytra marginal fringe of papillae present. Notochaetae distinctly thicker than neurochaetae. Bidentate neurochaetae absent.
