= Neopolynoe antarctica =

Scientific classification
- Kingdom: Animalia
- Phylum: Annelida
- Clade: Pleistoannelida
- Subclass: Errantia
- Order: Phyllodocida
- Family: Polynoidae
- Genus: Neopolynoe
- Species: N. antarctica

Binomial name
- Neopolynoe antarctica (Kinberg, 1858)

Species of annelid worm

Neopolynoe antarctica is a scale worm known from the Magallanes Region of the South Atlantic Ocean and from the Southern Ocean south of New Zealand at depths to about 200 m.

== Description ==
Neopolynoe antarctica has up to 86 segments with 15 pairs of elytra. There is a grayish-brown ovate ring and faint spots along the dorsum with the rings also on the dorsal cirri and antennae. The prostomium has a pair of acute anterior projections on its anterior margin and the lateral antennae are inserted beneath (ventrally) it. The notochaetae are distinctly thicker than the neurochaetae and possess bidentate tips.

== Biology ==
Neopolynoe antarctica has a commensal relationship with other tube-building polychaetes, with them hosting N. antarctica inside their tubes. Other host taxa include hydroids of the genus Thuiaria.
