= Gattyana nutti =

Scientific classification
- Kingdom: Animalia
- Phylum: Annelida
- Clade: Pleistoannelida
- Subclass: Errantia
- Order: Phyllodocida
- Family: Polynoidae
- Genus: Gattyana
- Species: G. nutti

Binomial name
- Gattyana nutti Pettibone, 1955

Species of annelid worm

Gattyana nutti is a scale worm known from the North Atlantic Ocean off the coast of North America at depths down to about 120 m.

== Description ==
Gattyana australis is a short-bodied worm with 35 segments and 15 pairs of elytra, which bear a marginal fringe of papillae. The prostomium bears a pair of acute anterior projections on its anterior margin. Lateral antennae are positioned ventrally on the prostomium, directly beneath the median antenna. Notochaetae are thinner than the neurochaetae, and the neurochaetae bear bidentate tips, which contradicts the diagnosis of the genus.
