= Eunoe senta =

Scientific classification
- Kingdom: Animalia
- Phylum: Annelida
- Clade: Pleistoannelida
- Subclass: Errantia
- Order: Phyllodocida
- Family: Polynoidae
- Genus: Eunoe
- Species: E. senta

Binomial name
- Eunoe senta (Moore, 1902)

Species of annelid worm

Eunoe senta is a scale worm described from Greenland, where it was collected by the Peary Relief Expedition in August 1892.

== Description ==
Number of segments 36; elytra 15 pairs. Dorsum pale yellow or colorless. prostomium anterior margin comprising a pair of acute anterior projections. Lateral antennae inserted ventrally (beneath prostomium and median antenna). Notochaetae about as thick as neurochaetae. Bidentate neurochaetae absent.
