= Subadyte micropapillata =

Scientific classification
- Kingdom: Animalia
- Phylum: Annelida
- Clade: Pleistoannelida
- Subclass: Errantia
- Order: Phyllodocida
- Family: Polynoidae
- Genus: Subadyte
- Species: S. micropapillata

Binomial name
- Subadyte micropapillata Barnich, Sun & Fiege, 2004

Species of annelid worm

Subadyte micropapillata is a scale worm known from Hainan Island in the South China Sea from depths of 5–15 m.

== Description ==
Subadyte micropapillata is a short-bodied worm with 37 segments and 16 pairs of elytra. The prostomium bears a pair of anterior projections on the anterior margin and the lateral antennae are positioned ventrally on it, directly beneath median antenna ceratophore. The notochaetae are about as thick as the neurochaetae, which also possess bidentate tips.
