= Eunoe tuerkayi =

Scientific classification
- Domain: Eukaryota
- Kingdom: Animalia
- Phylum: Annelida
- Clade: Pleistoannelida
- Subclass: Errantia
- Order: Phyllodocida
- Family: Polynoidae
- Genus: Eunoe
- Species: E. tuerkayi

Binomial name
- Eunoe tuerkayi Barnich & Fiege, 2003

Species of annelid

Eunoe tuerkayi is a scale worm described from the Mediterranean Sea at depths of about 30m.

== Description ==
Number of segments 40; elytra 15 pairs. Prostomium anterior margin comprising a pair of acute anterior projections. Lateral antennae inserted ventrally (beneath prostomium and median antenna). Elytra marginal fringe of papillae present. Notochaetae distinctly thicker than neurochaetae. Bidentate neurochaetae absent.
