= Gattyana brunnea =

Scientific classification
- Kingdom: Animalia
- Phylum: Annelida
- Clade: Pleistoannelida
- Subclass: Errantia
- Order: Phyllodocida
- Family: Polynoidae
- Genus: Gattyana
- Species: G. brunnea

Binomial name
- Gattyana brunnea Hartman, 1966

Species of annelid worm

Gattyana brunnea is a scale worm described from the North Pacific Ocean off the coast of California at a depth of about 550 m.

== Description ==
Gattyana brunnea is a short-bodied worm with 32 segments and 18 pairs of elytra, which bear a marginal fringe of papillae. The lateral antennae are positioned terminally on the prostomium continuing along its margin. Notochaetae are thinner than the neurochaetae.
