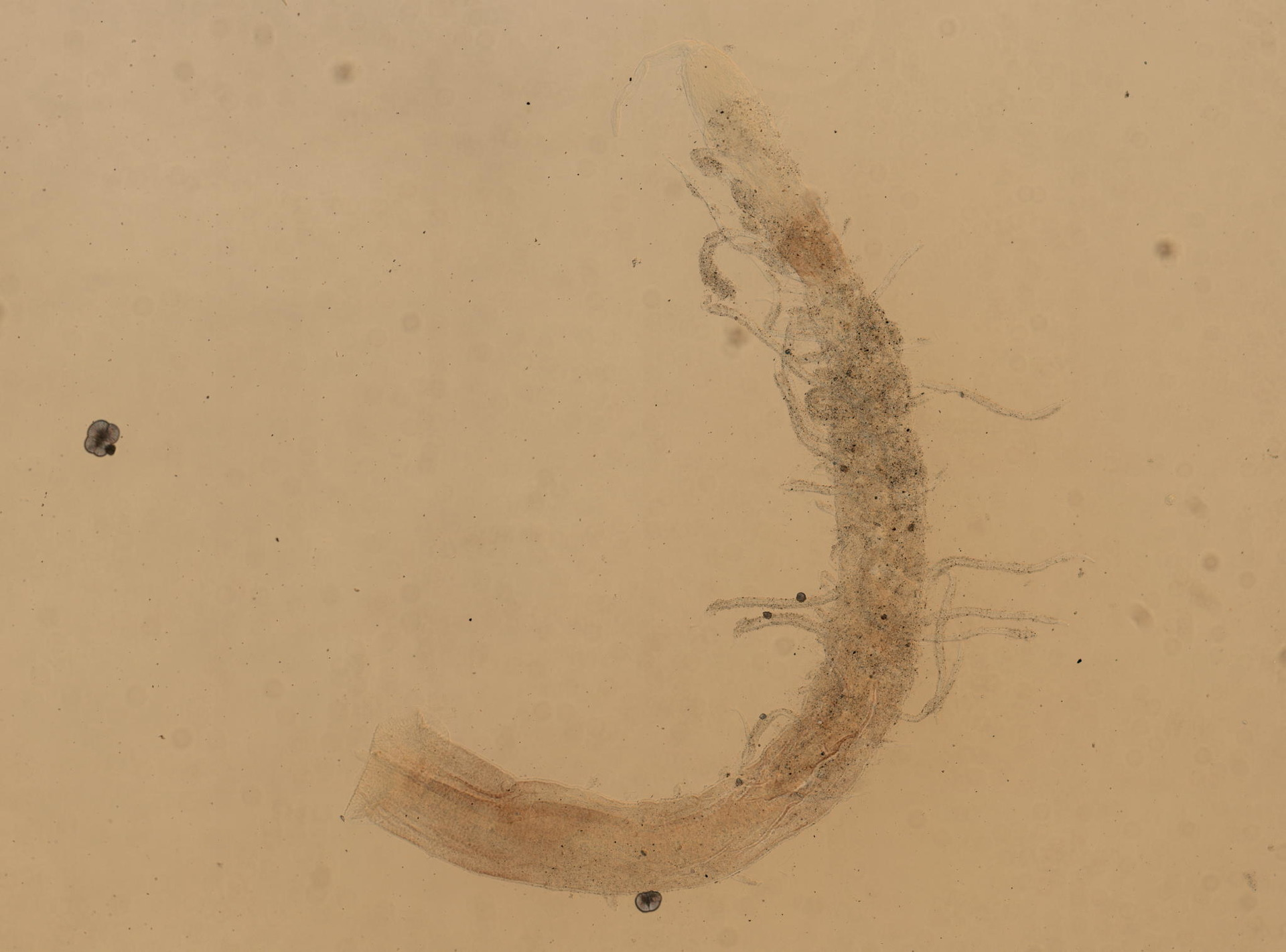

Scientific classification
- Kingdom: Animalia
- Phylum: Annelida
- Clade: Pleistoannelida
- Subclass: Errantia
- Order: Phyllodocida
- Family: Polynoidae
- Genus: Eunoe
- Species: E. oerstedi

Binomial name
- Eunoe oerstedi Malmgren, 1865

= Eunoe oerstedi =

Species of annelid worm

Eunoe oerstedi is a scale worm which is widely distributed in the Arctic Ocean, North Atlantic Ocean and North Pacific Ocean from shallow waters to depths of about 950m.

== Description ==
Number of segments 37; elytra 15 pairs. No distinct pigmentation pattern. Prostomium anterior margin comprising two rounded lobes. Lateral antennae inserted ventrally (beneath prostomium and median antenna). Elytra marginal fringe of papillae present. Notochaetae distinctly thicker than neurochaetae. Bidentate neurochaetae absent.

== Taxonomic comments ==
Eunoe nodosa and E. oerstedi are very similar and both species occur in the same regions. The two species differ in the ornamentation of the elytra, which are covered with very small nodular tubercles in E. nodosa while in E. oerstedi the tubercles are spiny.
