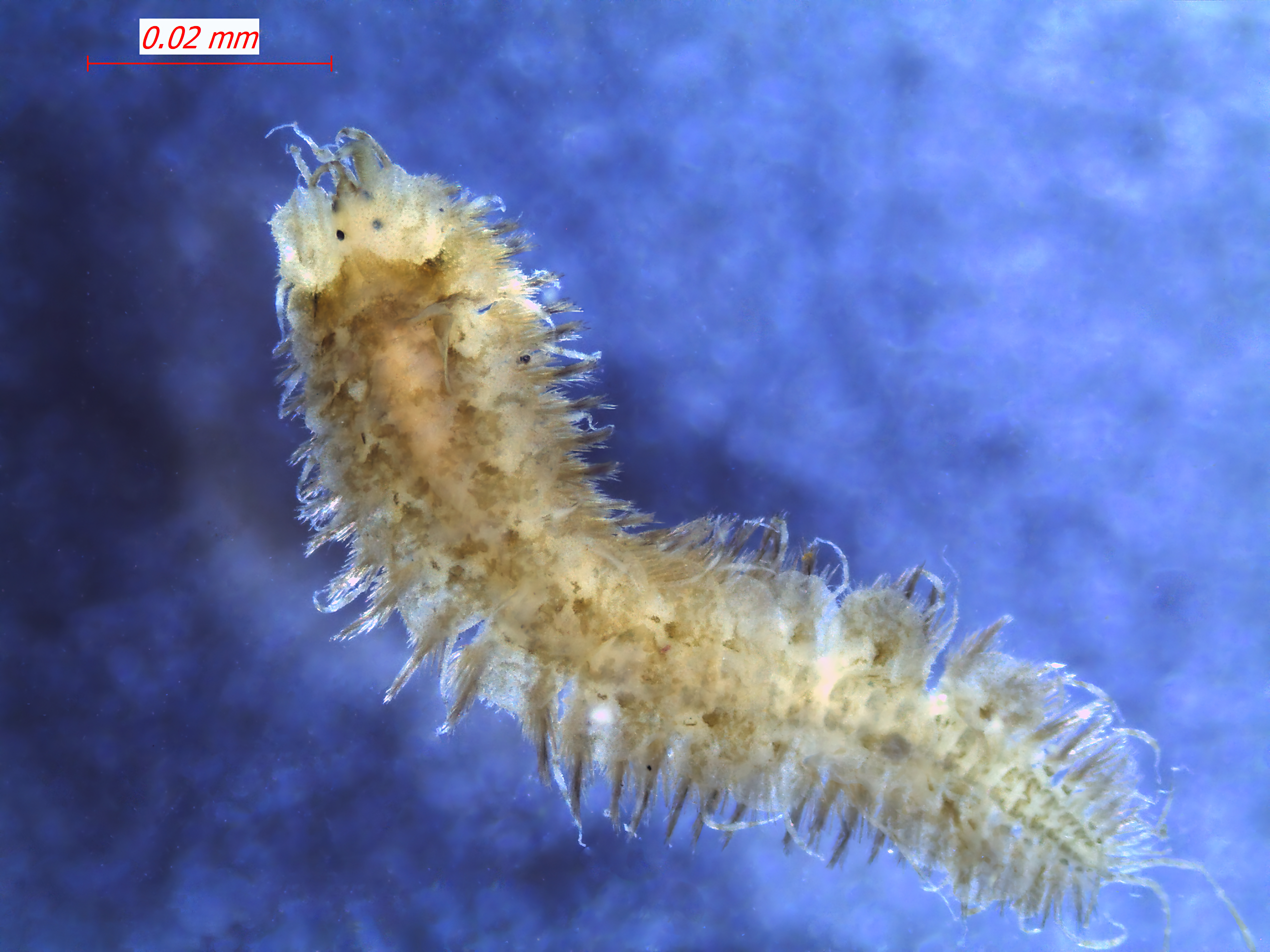

Scientific classification
- Kingdom: Animalia
- Phylum: Annelida
- Clade: Pleistoannelida
- Subclass: Errantia
- Order: Phyllodocida
- Family: Polynoidae
- Genus: Gattyana; McIntosh, 1897

Type species
- Gattyana cirrhosa (Pallas, 1766)

= Gattyana =

Genus of ring worms

Gattyana is a genus of marine annelids in the family Polynoidae (scale worms). The genus includes 11 species, 9 of which occur in the Northern Hemisphere, the remaining two are from the Indian Ocean off Mozambique and the Southern Ocean off New Zealand. Species of Gattyana are known from shallow water down to depths of about 1200 m.

== Description ==
Species of Gattyana are short-bodied scale worms with about 34 to 40 segments and 15 pairs of elytra which cover the dorsum completely and have a marginal fringe of papillae. The prostomium is bilobed anteriorly and a pair of cephalic peaks is present. The lateral antennae are inserted ventrally directly beneath the median antenna. The neuropodial lobe is elongate and tapering. Notochaetae of two kinds are present: with capillary tips and with blunt tips. All neurochaetae have unidentate tips.

== Species ==
As at October 2020, Gattyana includes 11 species:

- Gattyana amondseni (Malmgren, 1867)
- Gattyana australis Averincev, 1978
- Gattyana brunnea Hartman, 1966
- Gattyana ciliata Moore, 1902
- Gattyana cirrhosa (Pallas, 1766)
- Gattyana fauveli Misra, 1999
- Gattyana mossambica Day, 1962
- Gattyana nutti Pettibone, 1955
- Gattyana pacifica (Johnson, 1901)
- Gattyana pohaiensis Uschakov & Wu, 1959
- Gattyana treadwelli Pettibone, 1949
