= Eunoe spinulosa =

Scientific classification
- Kingdom: Animalia
- Phylum: Annelida
- Clade: Pleistoannelida
- Subclass: Errantia
- Order: Phyllodocida
- Family: Polynoidae
- Genus: Eunoe
- Species: E. spinulosa

Binomial name
- Eunoe spinulosa Verrill, 1879

Species of annelid

Eunoe spinulosa is a scale worm described from the North Atlantic Ocean off Nova Scotia.

== Description ==
Number of segments 49; elytra 15 pairs. No distinct pigmentation pattern remaining, chaetae brass-colored. Prostomium anterior margin comprising a pair of acute anterior projections. Lateral antennae inserted ventrally (beneath prostomium and median antenna). Elytra marginal fringe of papillae present. Notochaetae distinctly thicker than neurochaetae. Bidentate neurochaetae absent.
