= Eunoe (animal) =

- Eunoe leiotentaculata specimen from Museums Victoria.

Scientific classification
- Kingdom: Animalia
- Phylum: Annelida
- Clade: Pleistoannelida
- Subclass: Errantia
- Order: Phyllodocida
- Family: Polynoidae
- Genus: Eunoe; Malmgren, 1865

Type species
- Eunoe oerstedi Malmgren 1865

Synonyms
- Eunoa [auctt. misspelling for Eunoe] (incorrect subsequent spelling); Harmothoe (Eunoe) Malmgren, 1866; Polynoe (Eunoa) [auctt. misspelling for Eunoe] (incorrect subsequent spelling)

Genus of annelid worms

Eunoe is a genus of marine annelids in the family Polynoidae (scale worms). The genus includes 48 species which are found world-wide, mostly from depths of 50 m or more.

== Description ==
Body dorsoventrally flattened, short, with up to 50 segments; dorsum more or less covered by elytra or short posterior region uncovered. Fifteen pairs of elytra on segments 2, 4, 5, 7, 9, 11, 13, 15, 17, 19, 21, 23, 26, 29, and 32. Prostomium with or without distinct cephalic peaks and three antennae; lateral antennae inserted ventrally to median antenna. Anterior pair of eyes dorsolateral at widest part of prostomium, posterior pair dorsal near hind margin. Parapodia with elongate acicular lobes with both acicula penetrating epidermis; neuropodia with a supra-acicular process. Notochaetae stout with distinct rows of spines and blunt tip. Neurochaetae more numerous and more slender, with distinct rows of spines distally and exclusively unidentate tips.

The genus was described in 1865, with a modern redescription in Barnich & Fiege (2010). Eunoe is one of a number of related genera with 15 pairs of elytra.

== Species ==
The following species of Eunoe were accepted as valid as of October 2019:

- Eunoe abyssorum McIntosh, 1885
- Eunoe alvinella Pettibone, 1989
- Eunoe anderssoni (Bergström, 1916)
- Eunoe assimilis McIntosh, 1924
- Eunoe barbata Moore, 1910
- Eunoe bathydomus (Ditlevsen, 1917)
- Eunoe brunnea Hartman, 1978
- Eunoe campbellica Averincev, 1978
- Eunoe clarki Pettibone, 1951
- Eunoe crassa (Treadwell, 1924)
- Eunoe depressa Moore, 1905
- Eunoe etheridgei (Benham, 1915)
- Eunoe eura Chamberlin, 1919
- Eunoe hartmanae (Uschakov, 1962)
- Eunoe hozawai Okuda, 1939
- Eunoe hubrechti (McIntosh, 1900)
- Eunoe hydroidopapillata Rzhavsky & Shabad, 1999
- Eunoe iphionoides McIntosh, 1885
- Eunoe ivantsovi Averincev, 1978
- Eunoe kermadeca Kirkegaard, 1995
- Eunoe laetmogonensis Kirkegaard & Billett, 1980
- Eunoe leiotentaculata Averincev, 1978
- Eunoe macrophthalma McIntosh, 1924
- Eunoe mammiloba Czerniavsky, 1882
- Eunoe nodosa (M. Sars, 1861)
- Eunoe nodulosa Day, 1967
- Eunoe oerstedi Malmgren, 1865
- Eunoe opalina McIntosh, 1885
- Eunoe pallida (Ehlers, 1908)
- Eunoe papillaris Averincev, 1978
- Eunoe papillosa Amaral & Nonato, 1982
- Eunoe purpurea Treadwell, 1936
- Eunoe rhizoicola Hartmann-Schröder, 1962
- Eunoe senta (Moore, 1902)
- Eunoe sentiformis Uschakov, 1958
- Eunoe serrata Amaral & Nonato, 1982
- Eunoe shirikishinai Imajima & Hartman, 1964
- Eunoe spinicirris Annenkova, 1937
- Eunoe spinosa Imajima, 1997
- Eunoe spinulosa Verrill, 1879
- Eunoe subfumida (Grube, 1878)
- Eunoe subtruncata Annenkova, 1937
- Eunoe tritoni McIntosh, 1900
- Eunoe tuerkayi Barnich & Fiege, 2003
- Eunoe uniseriata Banse & Hobson, 1968
- Eunoe yedoensis McIntosh, 1885
