= Eunoe spinicirris =

Scientific classification
- Domain: Eukaryota
- Kingdom: Animalia
- Phylum: Annelida
- Clade: Pleistoannelida
- Subclass: Errantia
- Order: Phyllodocida
- Family: Polynoidae
- Genus: Eunoe
- Species: E. spinicirris

Binomial name
- Eunoe spinicirris Annenkova, 1937

Species of annelid

Eunoe spinicirris is a scale worm described from the Sea of Japan at depths of 30–200m.

== Description ==
Number of segments 42; elytra 15 pairs. Dorsum brown with white longitudinal band. Prostomium anterior margin comprising a pair of acute anterior projections. Lateral antennae inserted ventrally (beneath prostomium and median antenna). Elytra marginal fringe of papillae present. Notochaetae distinctly thicker than neurochaetae. Bidentate neurochaetae absent.
