= Eunoe bathydomus =

Scientific classification
- Domain: Eukaryota
- Kingdom: Animalia
- Phylum: Annelida
- Clade: Pleistoannelida
- Subclass: Errantia
- Order: Phyllodocida
- Family: Polynoidae
- Genus: Eunoe
- Species: E. bathydomus

Binomial name
- Eunoe bathydomus (Ditlevsen 1917)

Species of annelid worm

Eunoe bathydomus is a scale worm known from the north Atlantic Ocean at depths of 2000–3500 m.

== Description ==
Number of segments 44; elytra 15 pairs (presumably). Anterior margin of prostomium with an acute anterior projection. Lateral antennae inserted ventrally (beneath prostomium and median antenna). Notochaetae thinner than neurochaetae. Bidentate neurochaetae absent.

== Commensalism ==
E. bathydomus is commensal. Its host taxon is a sea cucumber: Deima validum (Echinodermata).
