= Gattyana australis =

Scientific classification
- Domain: Eukaryota
- Kingdom: Animalia
- Phylum: Annelida
- Clade: Pleistoannelida
- Subclass: Errantia
- Order: Phyllodocida
- Family: Polynoidae
- Genus: Gattyana
- Species: G. australis

Binomial name
- Gattyana australis Averincev, 1978

Species of annelid worm

Gattyana australis is a scale worm described from the Southern Ocean off New Zealand at a depths of 1100 to 1200 m.

== Description ==
Gattyana australis is a short-bodied worm with 37 segments and 15 pairs of elytra, which bear a marginal fringe of papillae. The lateral antennae are positioned ventrally on the prostomium, directly beneath the median antenna. Notochaetae are about as thick as the neurochaetae, and the neurochaetae bear bidentate tips, which contradicts the diagnosis of the genus.
