= Eunoe shirikishinai =

Scientific classification
- Kingdom: Animalia
- Phylum: Annelida
- Clade: Pleistoannelida
- Subclass: Errantia
- Order: Phyllodocida
- Family: Polynoidae
- Genus: Eunoe
- Species: E. shirikishinai

Binomial name
- Eunoe shirikishinai Imajima & Hartman, 1964

Species of annelid worm

Eunoe shirikishinai is a scale worm described from Hokkaido Island in the North Pacific Ocean.

== Description ==
Number of segments 39; elytra 15 pairs. Blackish pigment. Prostomium anterior margin comprising two rounded lobes. Lateral antennae inserted ventrally (beneath prostomium and median antenna). Elytra marginal fringe of papillae present. Notochaetae about as thick as neurochaetae. Bidentate neurochaetae absent.
