= Eunoe mammiloba =

Scientific classification
- Domain: Eukaryota
- Kingdom: Animalia
- Phylum: Annelida
- Clade: Pleistoannelida
- Subclass: Errantia
- Order: Phyllodocida
- Family: Polynoidae
- Genus: Eunoe
- Species: E. mammiloba

Binomial name
- Eunoe mammiloba Czerniavsky, 1882

Species of annelid worm

Eunoe mammiloba is a scale worm described from the Black Sea from a depth of 0.5m.

== Description ==
Number of segments 32; elytra 15 pairs (assumed). prostomium anterior margin comprising a pair of acute anterior projections. Notochaetae distinctly thicker than neurochaetae, or about as thick as neurochaetae. Bidentate neurochaetae absent.
