= Gattyana treadwelli =

Scientific classification
- Kingdom: Animalia
- Phylum: Annelida
- Clade: Pleistoannelida
- Subclass: Errantia
- Order: Phyllodocida
- Family: Polynoidae
- Genus: Gattyana
- Species: G. treadwelli

Binomial name
- Gattyana treadwelli Pettibone, 1949

Species of annelid worm

Gattyana treadwelli is a scale worm known from the north-west Pacific and Arctic Oceans from depths down to about 30 m.

== Description ==
Gattyana treadwelli is a short-bodied worm with 36 segments, each of which has dark transverse pigment bands along the dorsum as well as dark dorsal tubercles. It also has 15 pairs of elytra, which bear a marginal fringe of papillae. The prostomium bears a pair of acute anterior projections on its anterior margin. Lateral antennae are positioned ventrally on the prostomium, directly beneath the median antenna. Notochaetae are about as thick as or thinner than the neurochaetae, and the neurochaetae bear bidentate tips, which contradicts the diagnosis of the genus.
