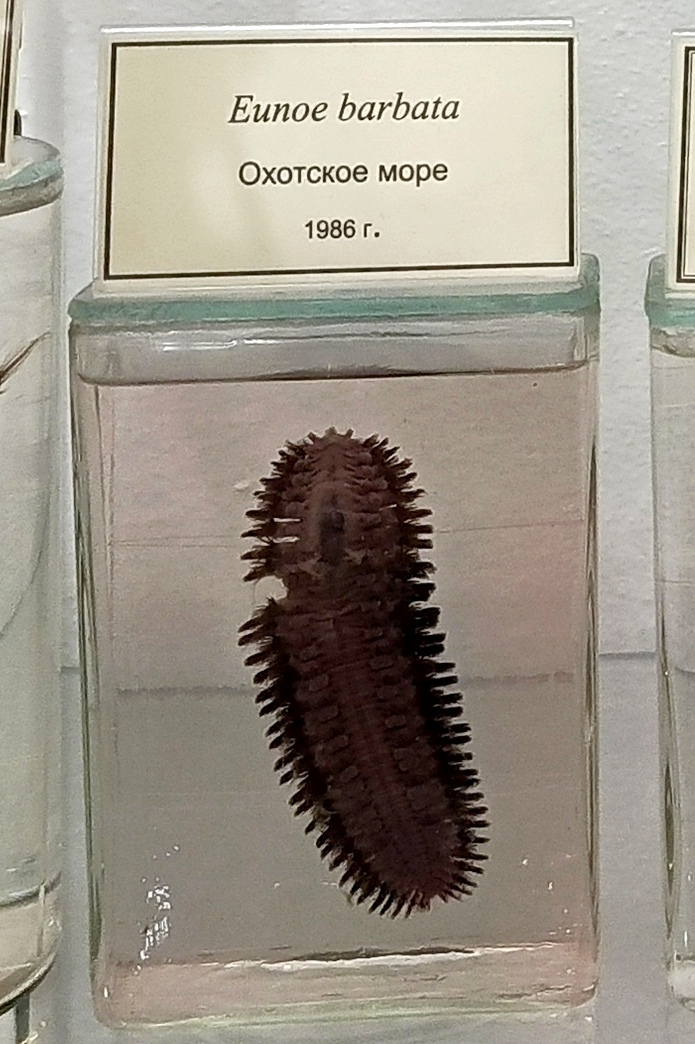

Scientific classification
- Kingdom: Animalia
- Phylum: Annelida
- Clade: Pleistoannelida
- Subclass: Errantia
- Order: Phyllodocida
- Family: Polynoidae
- Genus: Eunoe
- Species: E. barbata

Binomial name
- Eunoe barbata Moore 1910

= Eunoe barbata =

Species of annelid worm

Eunoe barbata is a scale worm, described from Puget Sound and Monterey Bay in the North-east Pacific Ocean.

== Description ==
Number of segments 39; elytra 15 pairs. Dorsum brown; prostomium purple, elytrophores brown; antennae and cirri mottled brown and white and with brown band and white tips. Anterior margin of prostomium with an acute anterior projection. Lateral antennae inserted ventrally (beneath prostomium and median antenna). Notochaetae about as thick as neurochaetae. Bidentate neurochaetae absent.
