= Eunoe leiotentaculata =

Scientific classification
- Domain: Eukaryota
- Kingdom: Animalia
- Phylum: Annelida
- Clade: Pleistoannelida
- Subclass: Errantia
- Order: Phyllodocida
- Family: Polynoidae
- Genus: Eunoe
- Species: E. leiotentaculata

Binomial name
- Eunoe leiotentaculata Averincev, 1978
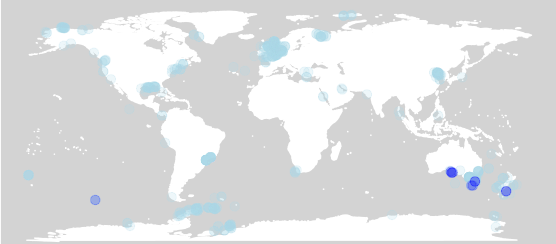
- Occurrence data for E. leiotentaculata (dark blue) with occurrence data of other Eunoe species (light blue)

Species of annelid worm

Eunoe leiotentaculata is a scale worm known from southern Australia and New Zealand and the South Pacific Ocean at depths of 500–1200 m.

== Species recognition ==
Image plate of Eunoe leiotentaculata. A. Whole specimen, B. Head and prostomium, C. Neurochaetae, D. Median parapodium

Within the geographic range of Eunoe leiotentaculata, at least 100 other species of Polynoidae also occur, but only about 3 other species share these features: 41-55 segments, a pair of distinct “peaks” on the prostomium, 15 pairs of elytra which have smooth margins lacking papillae, and all the ventral chaetae taper to a simple point. The taxonomic description below, and original sources, will be required to distinguish Eunoe leiotentaculata from the most similar species.

== Distribution ==
This species was originally collected in 1976 on a Russian voyage through the Tasman Sea and is now known to occur at depths of 500–1300 m around the coast of southern Australia and New Zealand.

== Description ==
Eunoe leiotentaculata is a short-bodied worm with 45–55 segments and 15 pairs of elytra, which are coloured with a purple gradient and cover the dorsum. The prostomium bears a pair of "peaks" on the anterior margin and the lateral antennae are inserted ventrally (beneath) to it. Notochaetae are about as thick as the neurochaetae, and have ornamentation of teeth or spines in transverse rows.

== Taxonomic context and confidence ==
There are about 168 genera in the family Polynoidae but many have not been validated by recent studies using DNA sequence data. The genus Eunoe contains 49 accepted species, which occur throughout the global oceans. Morphological features can distinguish Eunoe leiotentaculata from the other members of the genus but there is no review of all species and few have DNA sequence data. Sampling of the oceans is very sparse, especially at the depths where Eunoe species typically occur.
