= Eunoe subfumida =

Scientific classification
- Kingdom: Animalia
- Phylum: Annelida
- Clade: Pleistoannelida
- Subclass: Errantia
- Order: Phyllodocida
- Family: Polynoidae
- Genus: Eunoe
- Species: E. subfumida

Binomial name
- Eunoe subfumida (Grube, 1878)

Species of annelid

Eunoe subfumida is a scale worm described from the Philippines.

== Description ==
Number of segments 37; elytra 15 pairs. Dorsum brown with two white longitudinal lines. Notochaetae distinctly thicker than neurochaetae. Bidentate neurochaetae absent.
