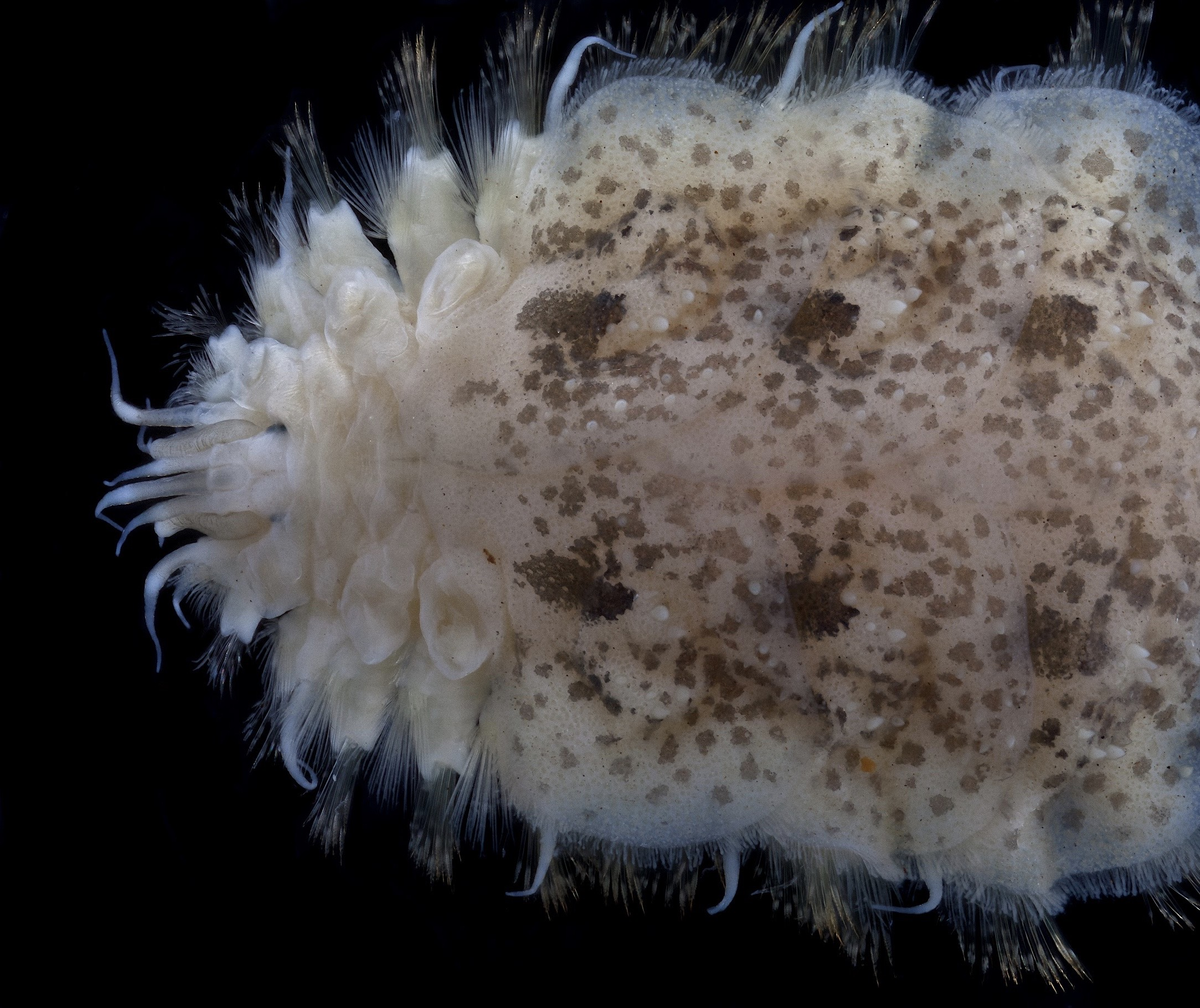
- Anterior of specimen from Museums Victoria

Scientific classification
- Kingdom: Animalia
- Phylum: Annelida
- Clade: Pleistoannelida
- Subclass: Errantia
- Order: Phyllodocida
- Family: Polynoidae
- Genus: Augenerilepidonotus; Pettibone, 1995
- Species: A. dictyolepis

Binomial name
- Augenerilepidonotus dictyolepis Haswell, 1883

= Augenerilepidonotus =

Genus of annelids

Augenerilepidonotus dictyolepis is a species of marine annelids in the family Polynoidae (scale worms) and the sole member of the genus Augenerilepidonotus. It is known from Australia, usually from depths of about 40 metres or less.

== Description ==
Body dorsoventrally flattened, short, with 26 segments and 12 pairs of elytra on segments 2, 4, 5, 7, 9, 11, 13, 15, 17, 19, 21, and 2. Prostomium with three antennae; lateral antennae continuous with prostomium, laterally to median antenna. elytra covered with chitinous irregular polygonal areas. Notochaetae slender and densely serrated. Neurochaetae much more stout, with few rows of spines distally and exclusively unidentate tips (see Pettibone, 1995 for detailed diagnosis) .

Augenerilepidonotus dictyolepis is very similar to species of Lepidonotus, differing only by the polygonal ornamentation of the elytra.

== Gallery ==
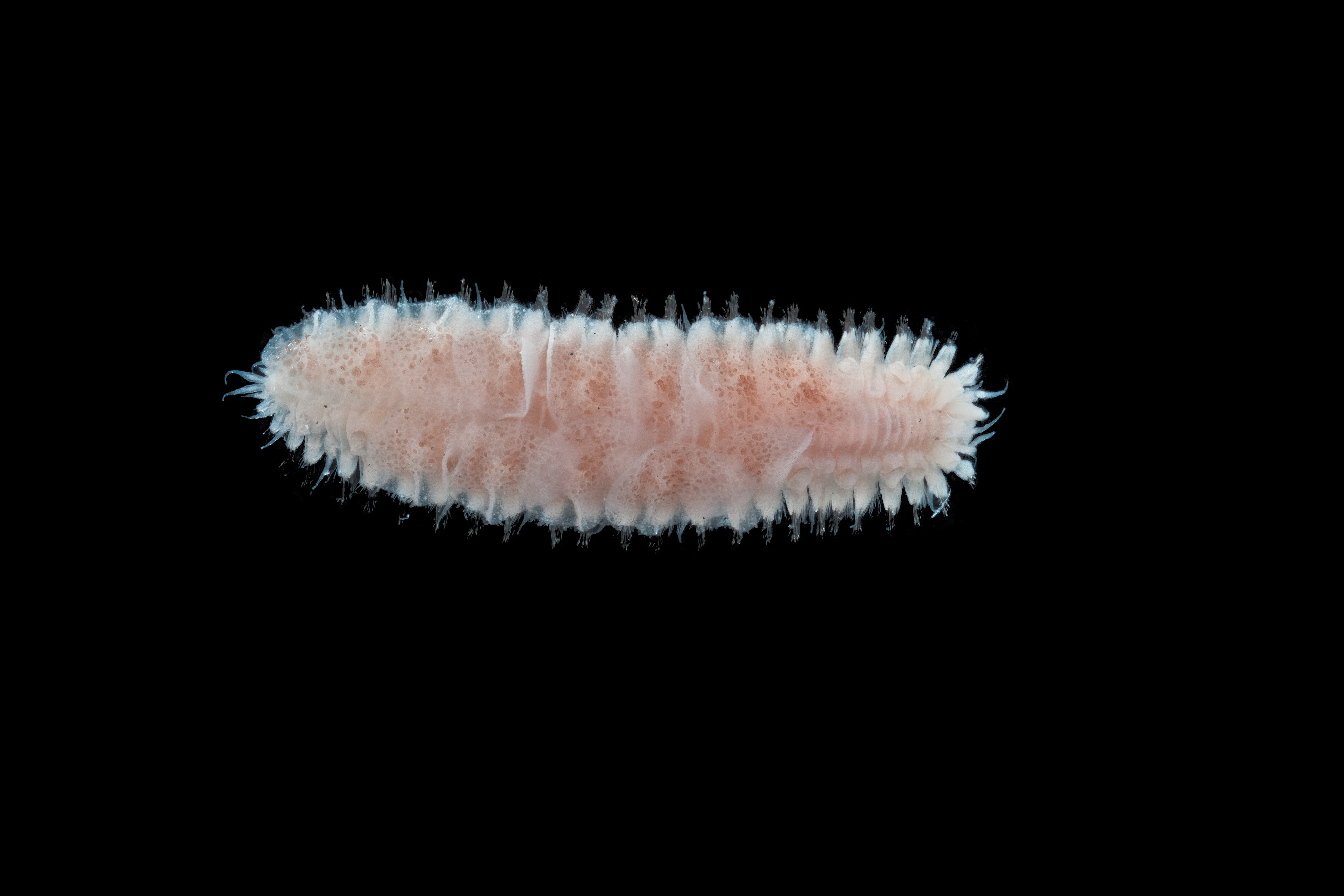
Dorsal view of a specimen from Museums Victoria

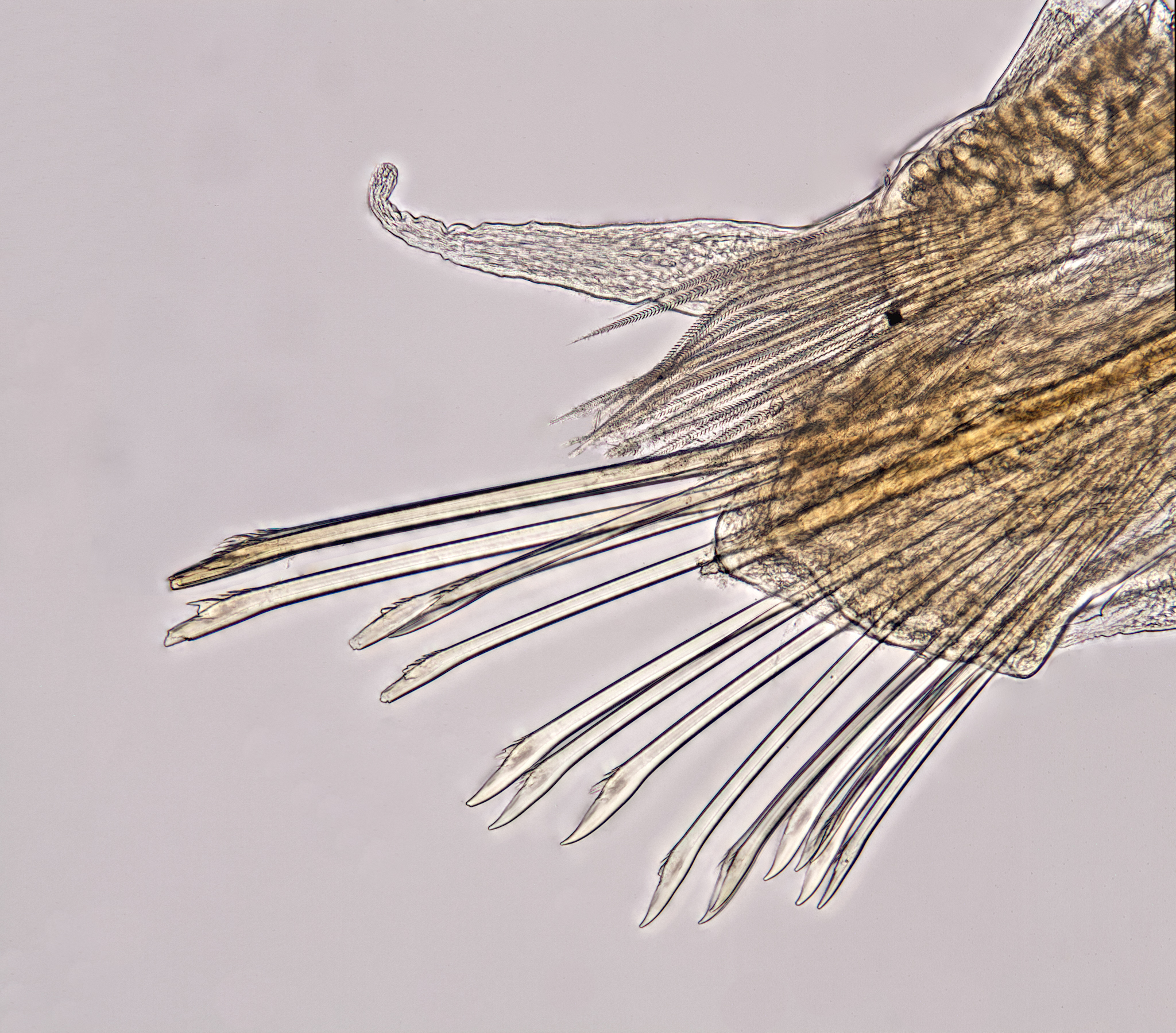
Median cirrigerous parapodium from a specimen from Museums Victoria
