= Gattyana fauveli =

Scientific classification
- Domain: Eukaryota
- Kingdom: Animalia
- Phylum: Annelida
- Clade: Pleistoannelida
- Subclass: Errantia
- Order: Phyllodocida
- Family: Polynoidae
- Genus: Gattyana
- Species: G. fauveli

Binomial name
- Gattyana fauveli Misra, 1999

Species of annelid worm

Gattyana fauveli is a scale worm described from the Bay of Bengal in the Indian Ocean in intertidal and shallow water.

== Biology and Ecology ==
Gattyana fauveli has a commensal relationship with the echiuran, Anelassorhynchus branchiorhynchus.
