= Aaron Louis Treadwell =

American educator (1866–1947)

- Born: 1866; Redding, Connecticut
- Died: 1947 (aged 80–81)
- Scientific career
- Fields: Zoology; Geology; Biology
- Workplaces: Miami University; Vassar College; Marine Biological Laboratory

Aaron Louis Treadwell, Ph.D. (1866–1947) was a college professor of zoology at Vassar. He was born at Redding, Connecticut, and educated at Wesleyan University (B.S., 1888; M.S., 1890) and at the University of Chicago (Ph.D., 1898). He was a professor of zoology and geology at Miami University (1891–1900), professor of biology at Vassar (1900–14), and afterwards professor of zoology. In addition to his work in the schools, he was instructor at the Marine Biological Laboratory at Woods Hole. Treadwell published The Cytogeny of Podarke obscura (1901). His writings dealt chiefly with annelid systematics and embryonics.
