= William M'Intosh =

Scottish physician and marine zoologist (1838–1931)

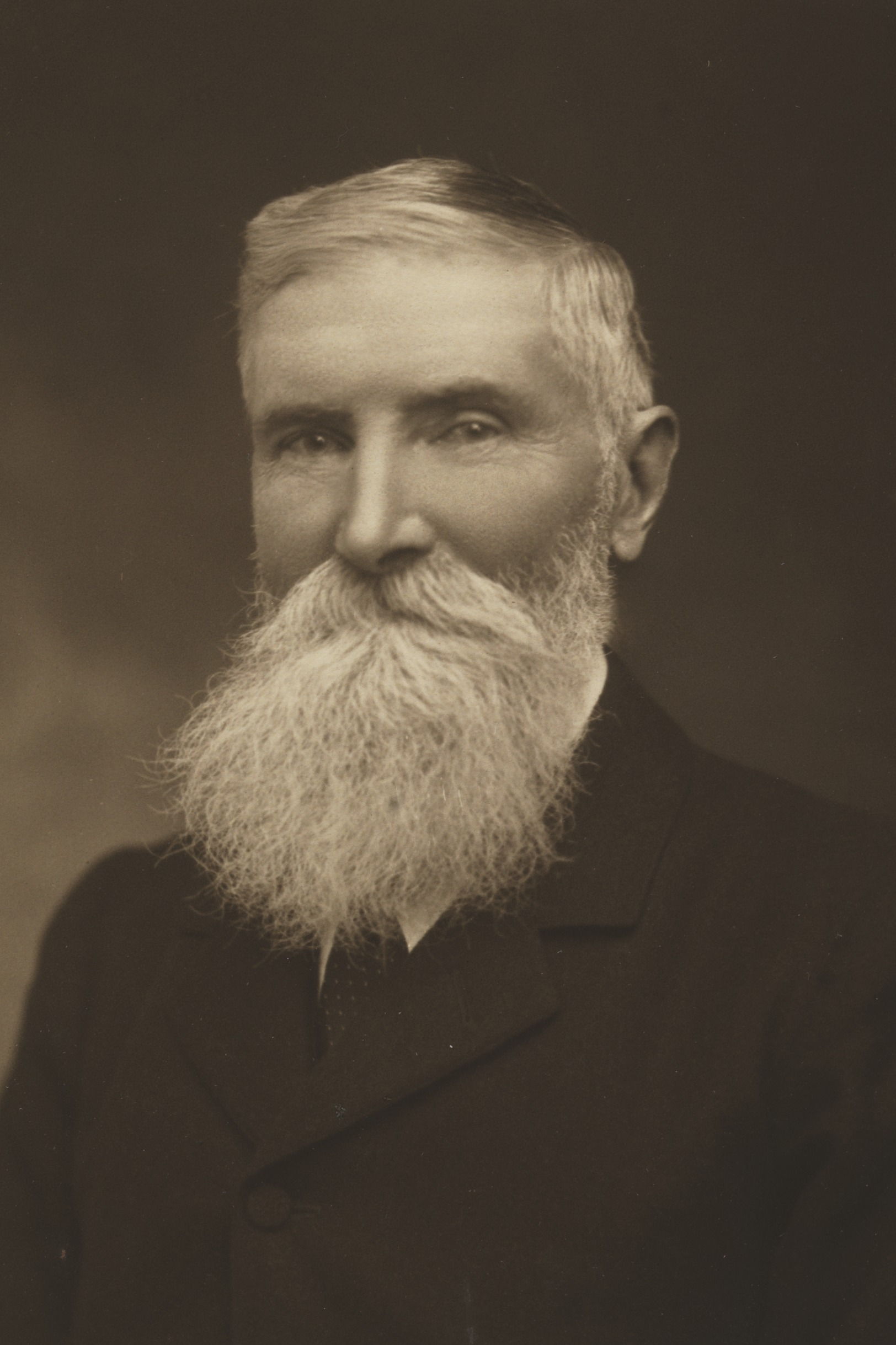

William Carmichael M'Intosh FRSE FRS FLS LLD (also spelt McIntosh; 10 October 1838, St Andrews – 1 April 1931, St Andrews) was a Scottish physician and marine zoologist. He served as president of the Ray Society, as vice-president of the Royal Society of Edinburgh (1927–1930), and was awarded the Neill Prize (1865–1868).

== Life ==
He was born in St Andrews on 10 October 1838 the son of Baillie John McIntosh and his wife, Eliza Mitchell. He studied medicine at St Andrews University 1853 to 1857. He was licensed by the Royal College of Surgeons of Edinburgh in 1860, as the local licensing body and also gaining an MD for his thesis "Observations and experiments on the carcinus mœnas" from the University of Edinburgh. He then began working at Murray Royal Asylum near Perth, where he remained for three years before moving to the Murthly Asylum nearby in 1863.

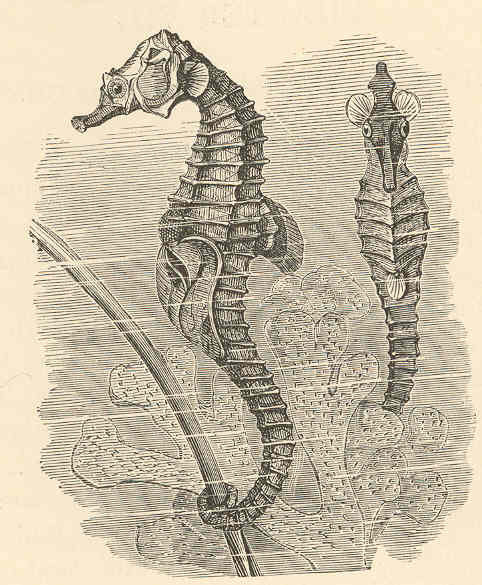
Illustration from one of M'Intosh's works

McIntosh worked as Medical Superintendent of Murthly for eighteen years, leaving in 1882 to take on a professorship at St Andrews University, reflecting his strong interest and knowledge in Natural History.

In this latter field he gained distinction as a renowned botanist and marine biologist, travelling on HMS Challenger during the Challenger expedition of 1872 to 1876. He was professor of natural history at St Andrews University from 1882 to 1917, succeeded by D'Arcy Wentworth Thompson. He was also director of the university museum and was the first director of the university's Gatty Marine Laboratory (founded 1896). McIntosh was also a fellow of the Linnean Society of London, a fellow of the Royal Society of Edinburgh, and a corresponding member of the Zoological Society. He was elected a fellow of the Royal Society in 1877, and was awarded the Royal Society's Royal Medal in 1899: "For his important monographs on British marine zoology and on the fishing industries." He received the honorary degree Doctor of laws (LL.D.) from the University of St Andrews in 1900, and was awarded the Linnean Medal in 1924.

He died in St Andrews on 1 April 1931.

== Family ==
He was the only son and had five sisters; he never married.

At the suggestion of his mother in 1863 his next youngest sister Agnes (1 September 1840 – 24 March 1923) lived with him as his housekeeper. They moved to Murthly in 1864 when William was appointed Superintendent of the Perth District Asylum and they remained there until 1882.

His youngest sister, Roberta (19 January 1843 – 2 September 1869), married the zoologist Albert Gunther.

== Publications ==
He published two major works in his life, A Monograph of the British Annelids (1873–1915) in four parts and nine volumes, and The Marine Invertebrates and Fishes of St. Andrews (1875).

... Reports on important collections made during various cruises under Government and other auspices have largely occupied the attention of Professor McIntosh. Annelids from Canada, Kerguelen's Island (Transit of Venus Expedition), from the Polar Sea (British North Polar Expedition), and extensive collections made by the " Valorous " and the " Porcupine " have passed under his skilled examination; but his greatest achievement of this kind is the ponderous volume dealing with the collection brought home by H.M.S. Challenger,—a volume which the late Dr. W. B. Carpenter prophesied would "mark an era in our knowledge of this important division of the Marine Invertebrata." Extending to almost six hundred pages, and embracing nearly a hundred exquisite plates, it forms one of the most valuable of the great " Challenger " series, and occupied nearly seven years in its preparation.
