= Elytron (annelid anatomy) =

Paired dorsal scale in annelids

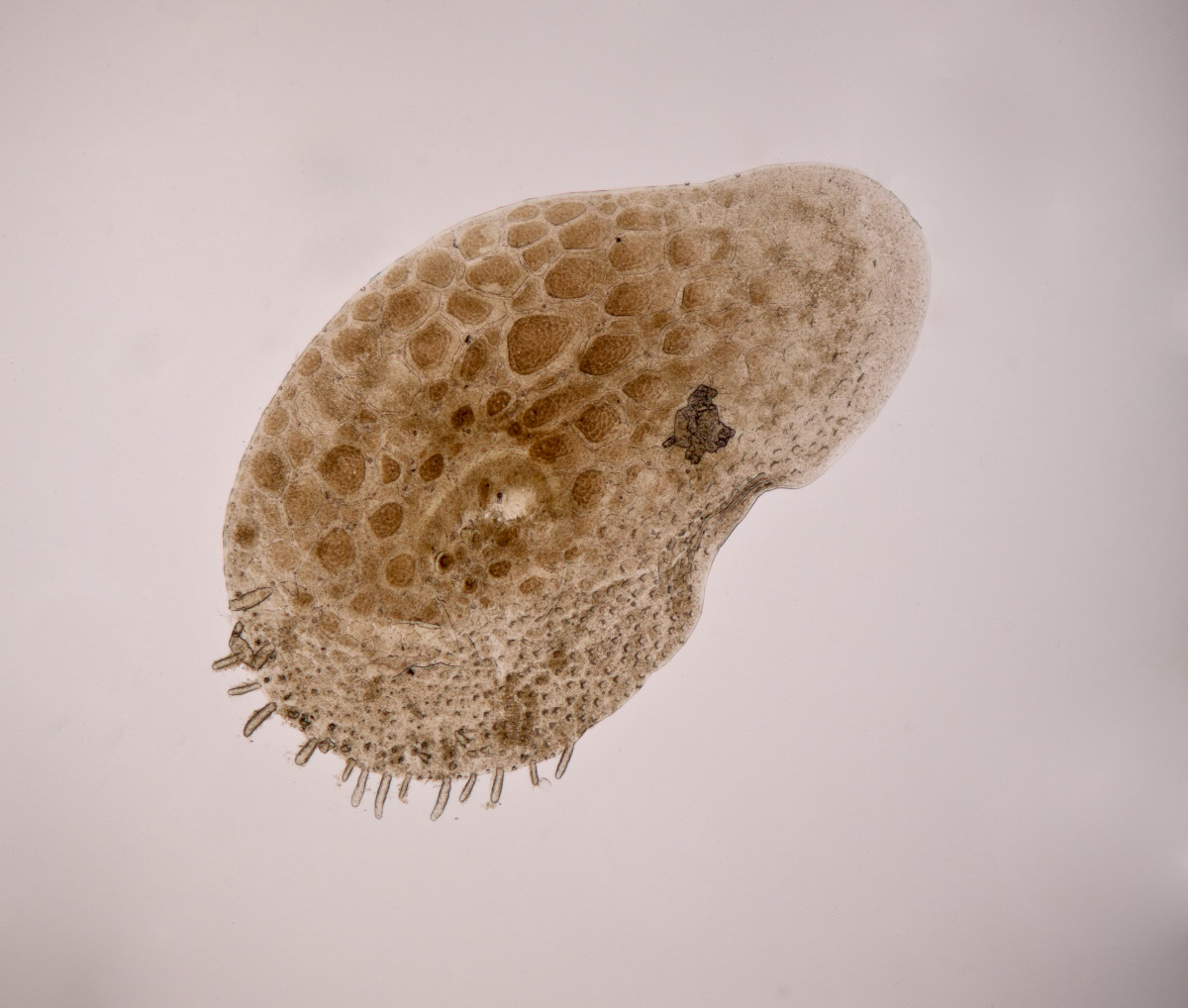
Microscope image of an individual elytron from Augenerilepidonotus dictyolepis. Note the fringing papillae on the border.

In annelids, elytra (/-trə/; from Greek ἔλυτρον "sheath, cover"; sing.: elytron /ˈɛlətrɒn/) are shield-like scales that are attached dorsally, one pair on each of a number of alternating segments and entirely or partly cover the dorsum. Elytra are modified dorsal cirri, and their number, size, location, and ornamentation are important taxonomic characters. The basal part of the elytra is known as the elytrophore; if (as is often the case) elytra are lost their presence is indicated by the elytrophore which is still present and visible.

Annelids possessing elytra are also known as "scale worms". Possession of elytra is characteristic of the annelid suborder Aphroditiformia.

== Gallery ==
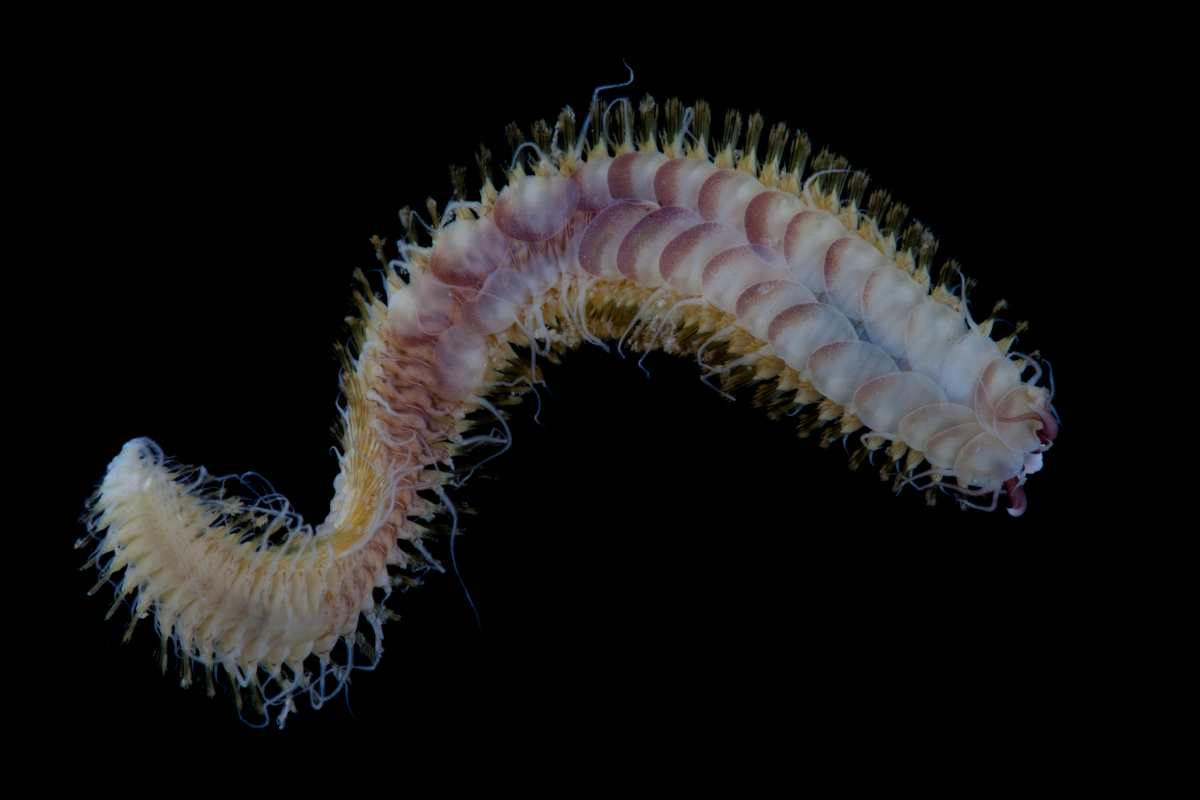
A Eunoe leiotentaculata specimen showing its 15 pairs of elytra.

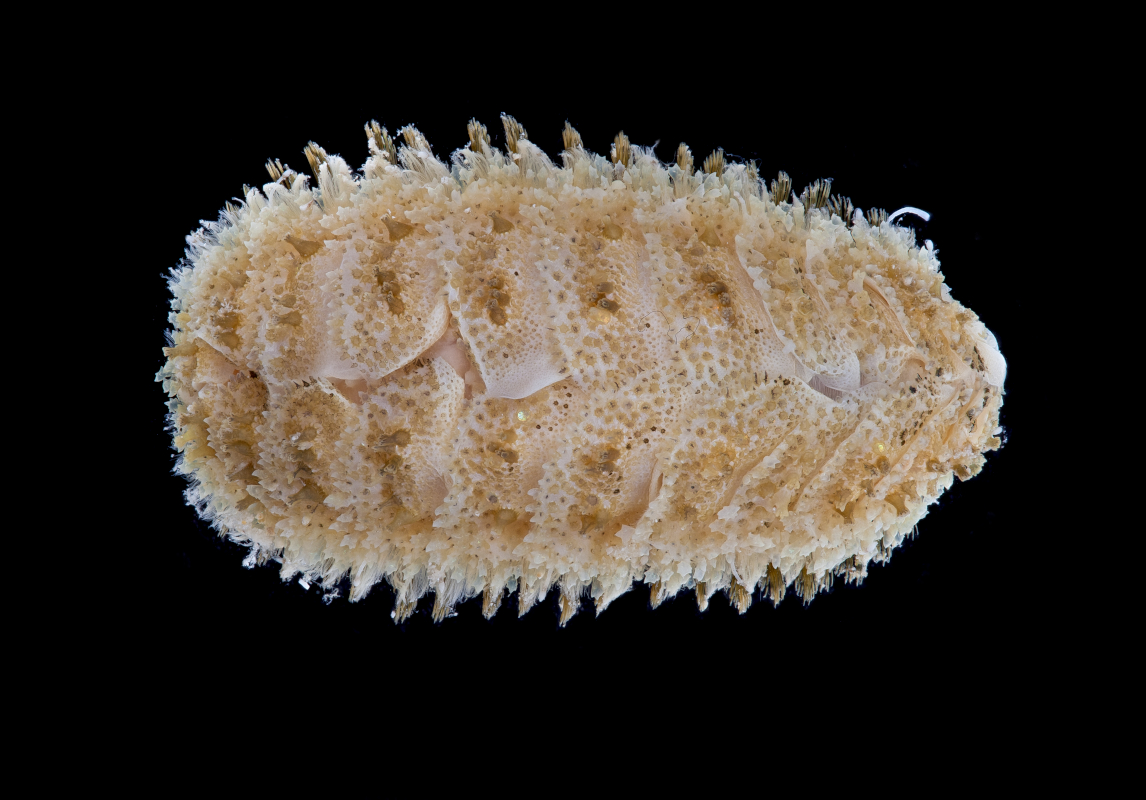
Euphione sp. specimen with its highly ornamented elytra.
