= Prostomium =

Cephized first segment of an annelid worm's body

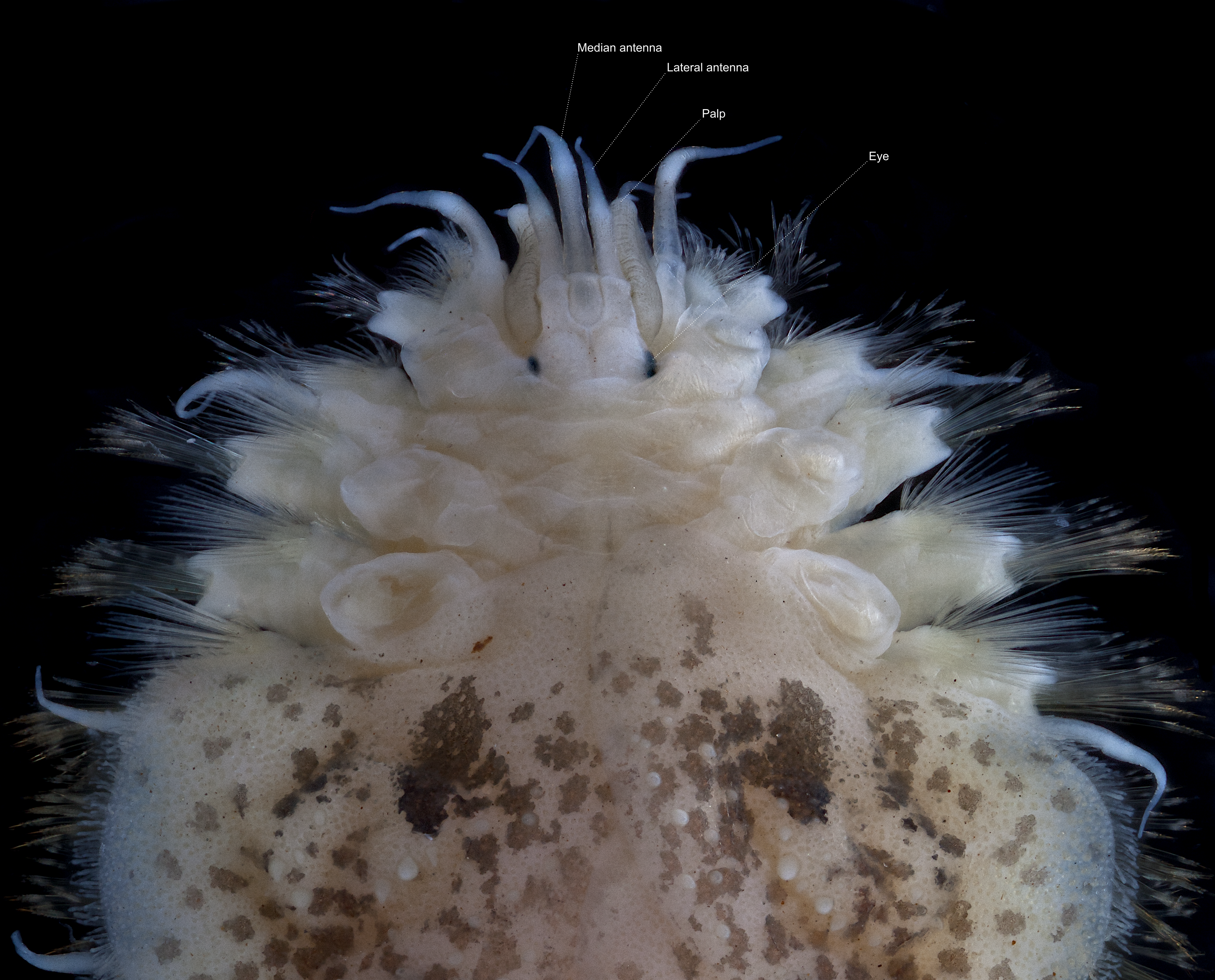
Augenerilepidonotus dictyolepis specimen from Museums Victoria showing the prostomium with notable structures labelled

The prostomium (From Ancient Greek, meaning "before the mouth"; pl.: prostomia; sometimes also called the "acron") is the cephalized first body segment in an annelid worm's body at the anterior end. It is in front of (but does not include) the mouth, being usually a small shelf- or lip-like extension over the dorsal side of the mouth. The prostomium together with the peristomium, which includes the mouth and pharynx, make up the annelid head.

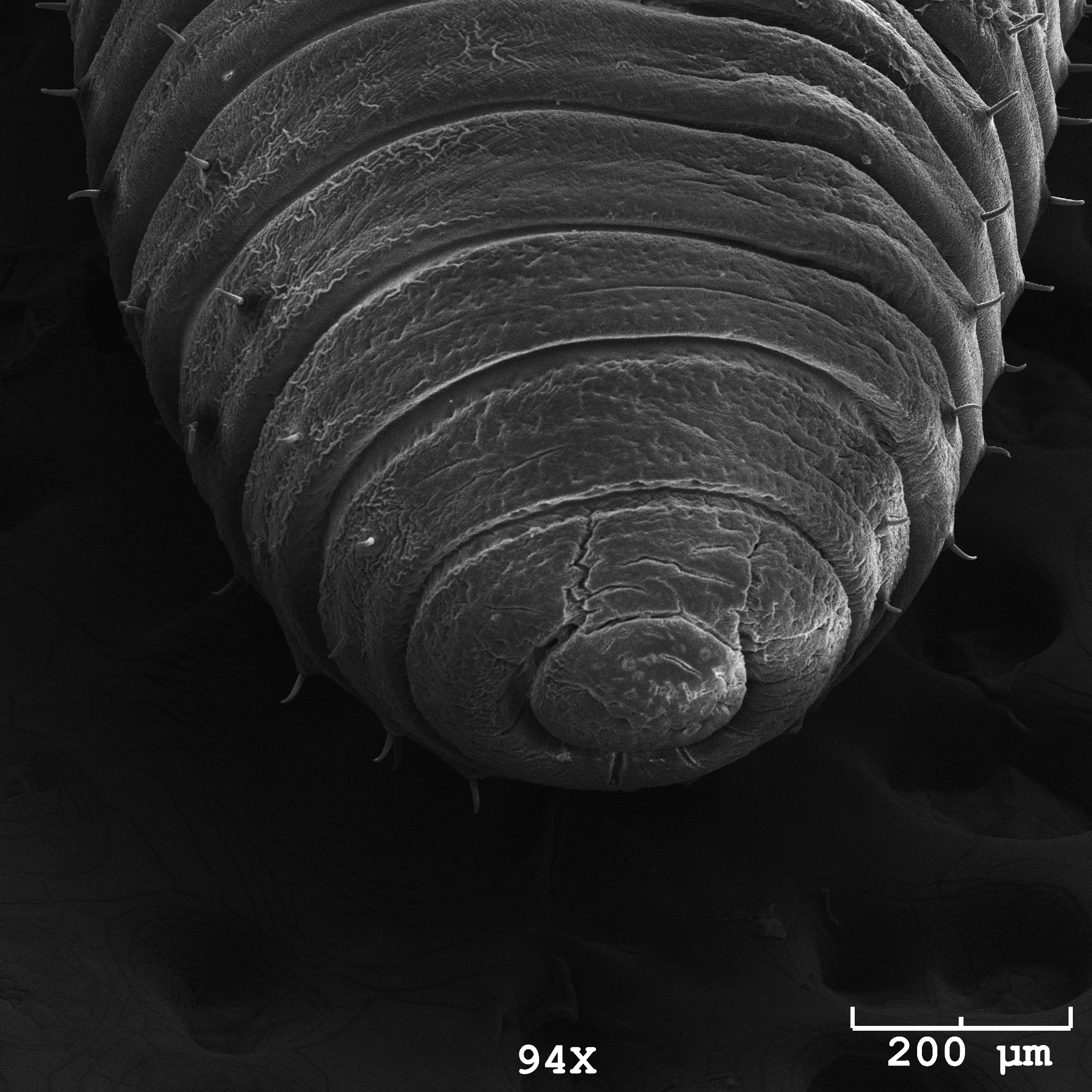
Scanning electron micrograph of a newly hatched European nightcrawler (Dendrobaena hortensis) showing the prostomium

== Description ==
The prostomium is part of the head and holds at least part of the brain and, in polychaetes, often bears sensory structures, such as the eyes, antennae and palps. It may function like a kind of overlip when the animal is feeding. The prostomium bears many important taxonomic characters and its shape and composition are important for annelid systematics.

In addition to the eyes (up to two pairs present in e.g. Sigalionidae, Hesionidae and Pholoidae), antennae and palps, the prostomium can possess appendages such as tentacles or cirri. Moreover, some polychaete prostomia have a posterior extension or ridge with sensory function, called a caruncle. Another sensory organ, the nuchal organ (or a variation, the nuchal epaulette), is a chemosensory, ciliated pit or groove at the posterior end of the prostomium.

== Appendages ==
There may be three antennae present: a pair of lateral antennae and one median antenna. These are most commonly simple, tapering structures, but they may also be articulated or ornamented. There are different arrangements of insertion of the lateral and median antennae, with the lateral antenna sometimes inserted ventrally to the median antennae or vice versa, or they may be inserted on the same plane. In some taxa, the lateral antennae may be missing, leaving only a lone median antenna.

The palps are paired and innervated structures that tend to be located ventrally and laterally. They are often associated with the mouth and may have a feeding or sensory function.

Tentacular cirri can be any sort of elongated, forward (anterior) facing cirri and can occasionally be found on the prostomium.

== See also ==
- Peristomium
- Pygidium
