= Chaeta =

Chitinous bristle found on annelid worms

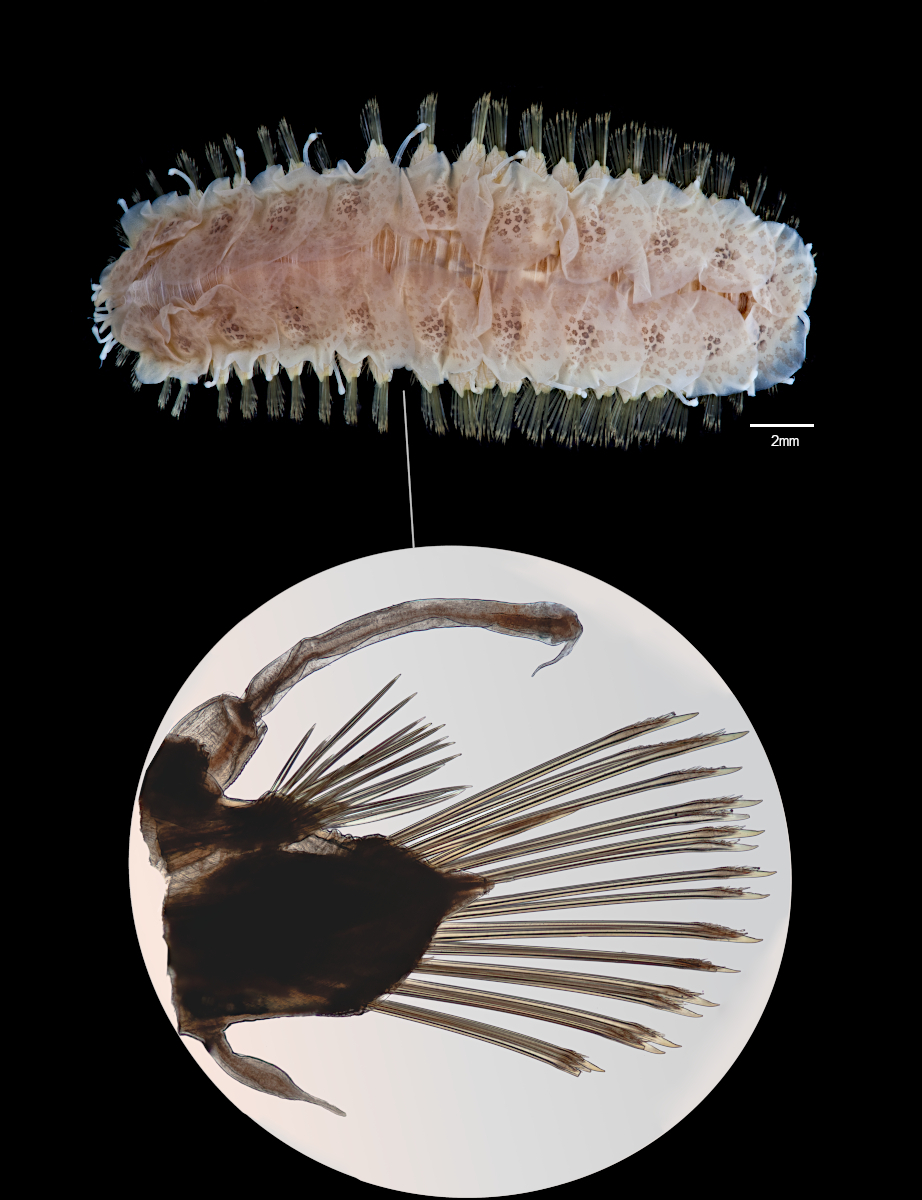
Specimen of the annelid, Lepidonotus oculatus showing its chaetae projecting laterally, with a microscope image of one of its parapodia and chaetae (inset). Museums Victoria specimen.

A chaeta or cheta (from Ancient Greek χαίτη (khaítē) 'crest, mane, flowing hair'; pl. chaetae) is a chitinous bristle or seta found on annelid worms, although the term is also frequently used to describe similar structures in other invertebrates such as arthropods. Polychaete annelids (polychaeta literally meaning "many bristles") are named for their chaetae. In Polychaeta, chaetae are found as bundles on the parapodia, paired appendages on the side of the body. The chaetae are epidermal, extracellular structures, and clearly visible in most polychaetes. They are probably the best-studied structures in these animals. Segments bearing chaetae are called chaetigers.

== Use in taxonomy and identification ==
The ultrastructure of chaetae is fundamentally similar for all taxa but there is vast diversity in chaetal morphology. Moreover, chaetae bear precise characters for determination of species and taxonomic assessment. The shape, absolute and relative size, number, position, ornamentation and type are important taxonomic characters and specific types are often associated with families or genera. They are sometimes also species-specific and in some cases can be used to differentiate otherwise identical-looking species.

== Types of chaetae ==
Microscope photograph of a parapodium from a specimen of Arctonoe sp. showing the chaetae and internal acicula. This parapodium is from a Museums Victoria specimen.

Both lobes of the parapodium, the notopodium and neuropodium can bear chaetae. Chaetae on the notopodium are called notochaetae and those on the neuropodium are called neurochaetae. Thick, internal chaetae that provide support for well-developed notopodia or parapodia are called acicula.

A wide range of chaetal shapes and arrangements exists:

Basic forms are capillaries and spines. Capillaries are the most common form of chaetae and are very thin and tapering. Spines are also common but are thicker and stouter than capillaries and may be curved or straight and can be distally dentate (e.g. unidentate or bidentate).

Furcate (also called comb, forked or brush) chaetae are similar to capillaries for most of their length but expand distally into a flattened comb- or fork-like tip.

Hooks are stout chaetae that curve distally and may be dentate or strongly curved (falcate). These chaetae may also be capped with a translucent hyaline hood.

Compound chaetae possess a joint or hinge toward the distal end that allows a distal blade or appendage to articulate around it.

Uncini are highly modified chaetae in which the shaft is reduced (or virtually absent) and the tip is broadened to create short, stout structures. These are often present in sedentary taxa.

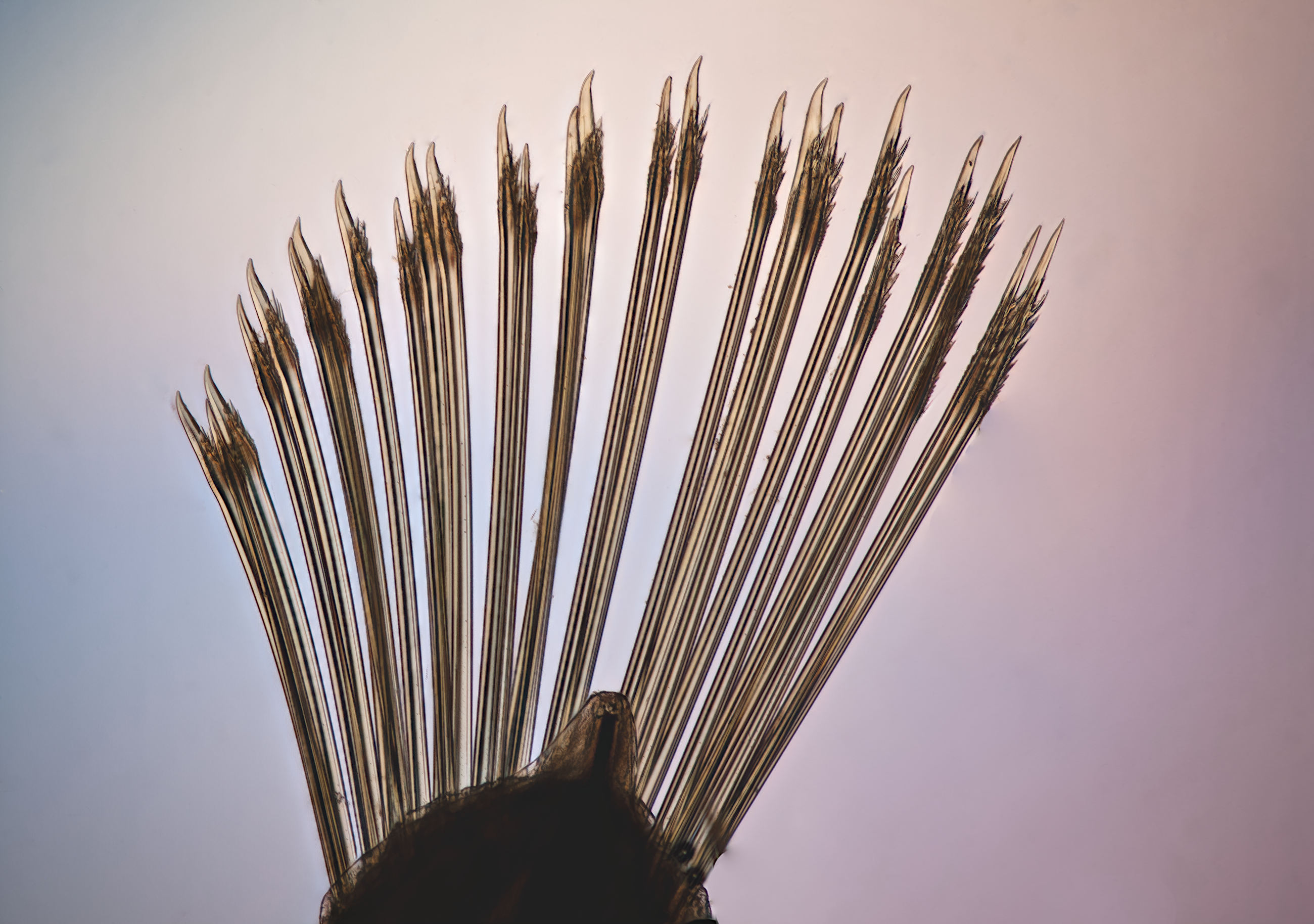
unidentate neurochaetae from a Lepidonotus sp. specimen from Museums Victoria

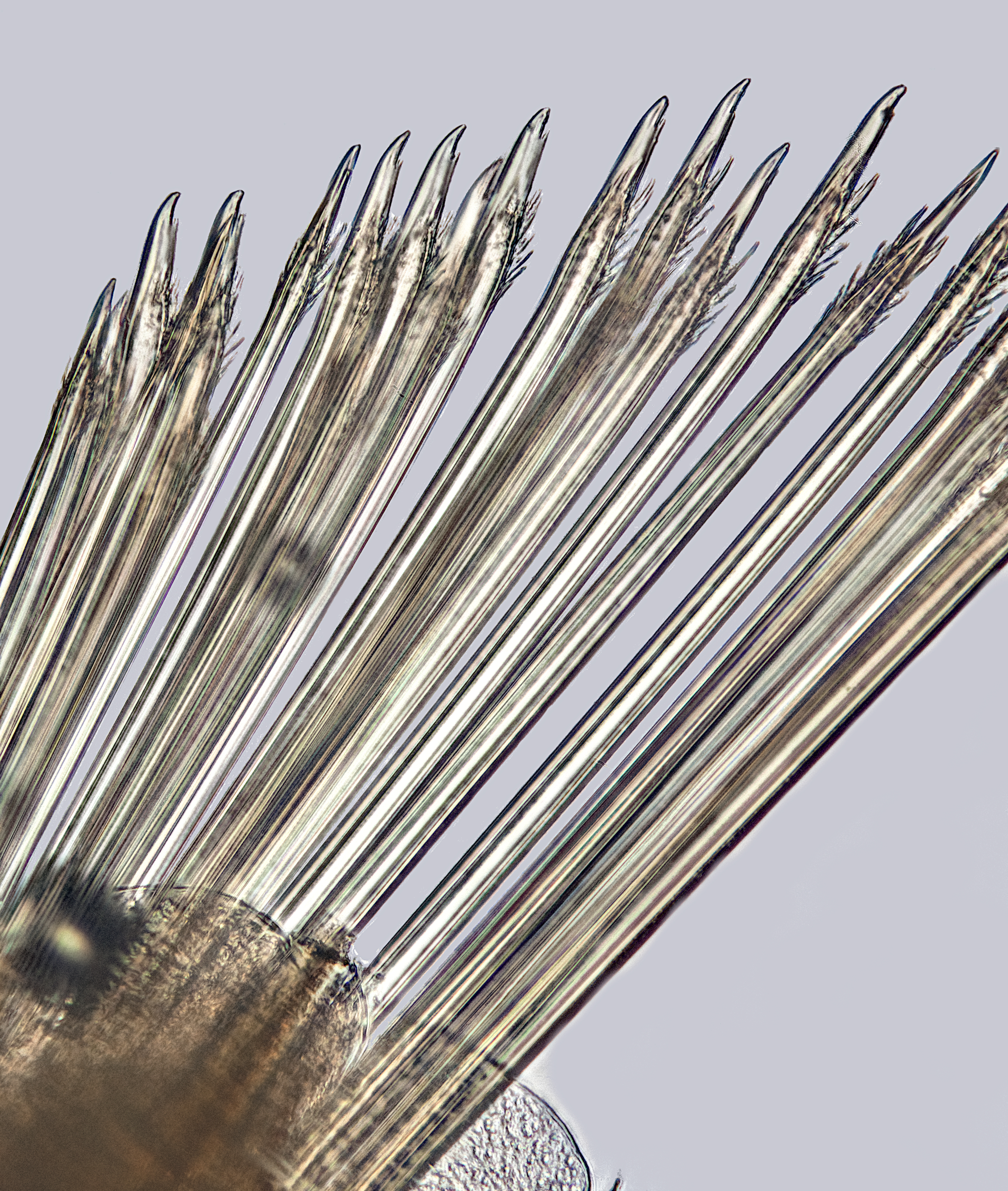
bidentate neurochaetae from a Lepidonotus sp. specimen from Museums Victoria

== See also ==
- Chaetotaxy
