= Ophryotrocha magnadentata =

Scientific classification
- Kingdom: Animalia
- Phylum: Annelida
- Clade: Pleistoannelida
- Subclass: Errantia
- Order: Eunicida
- Family: Dorvilleidae
- Genus: Ophryotrocha
- Species: O. magnadentata

Binomial name
- Ophryotrocha magnadentata Wiklund et al., 2012

Species of annelid

Ophryotrocha magnadentata is a species of polychaete worm, first found on deep sea whale fall and wood fall habitats in the north-east Pacific, off the southern Californian coast. This species and Ophryotrocha longicollaris are sister species; together with O. nauarchus and O. flabella, it falls in a clade including O. globopalpata and Exallopus jumarsi from the shallow North Atlantic.
