= Ophryotrocha langstrumpae =

Scientific classification
- Kingdom: Animalia
- Phylum: Annelida
- Clade: Pleistoannelida
- Subclass: Errantia
- Order: Eunicida
- Family: Dorvilleidae
- Genus: Ophryotrocha
- Species: O. langstrumpae

Binomial name
- Ophryotrocha langstrumpae Wiklund et al., 2012

Species of Polychaeta

Ophryotrocha langstrumpae is a species of polychaete worm, first found on deep sea whale fall and wood fall habitats in the north-east Pacific, off the southern Californian coast. It is closely related to Ophryotrocha scutellus and Ophryotrocha batillus.
