= Ophryotrocha longicollaris =

Scientific classification
- Kingdom: Animalia
- Phylum: Annelida
- Clade: Pleistoannelida
- Subclass: Errantia
- Order: Eunicida
- Family: Dorvilleidae
- Genus: Ophryotrocha
- Species: O. longicollaris

Binomial name
- Ophryotrocha longicollaris Wiklund et al., 2012

Species of Polychaeta

Ophryotrocha longicollaris is a species of polychaete worm, first found on deep sea whale fall and wood fall habitats in the north-east Pacific, off the southern Californian coast. This species and Ophryotrocha magnadentata are sister species; together with O. nauarchus and O. flabella, it falls in a clade including O. globopalpata and Exallopus jumarsi from the shallow North Atlantic.
