= Ophryotrocha batillus =

Scientific classification
- Kingdom: Animalia
- Phylum: Annelida
- Clade: Pleistoannelida
- Subclass: Errantia
- Order: Eunicida
- Family: Dorvilleidae
- Genus: Ophryotrocha
- Species: O. batillus

Binomial name
- Ophryotrocha batillus Wiklund et al., 2012

Species of Polychaeta

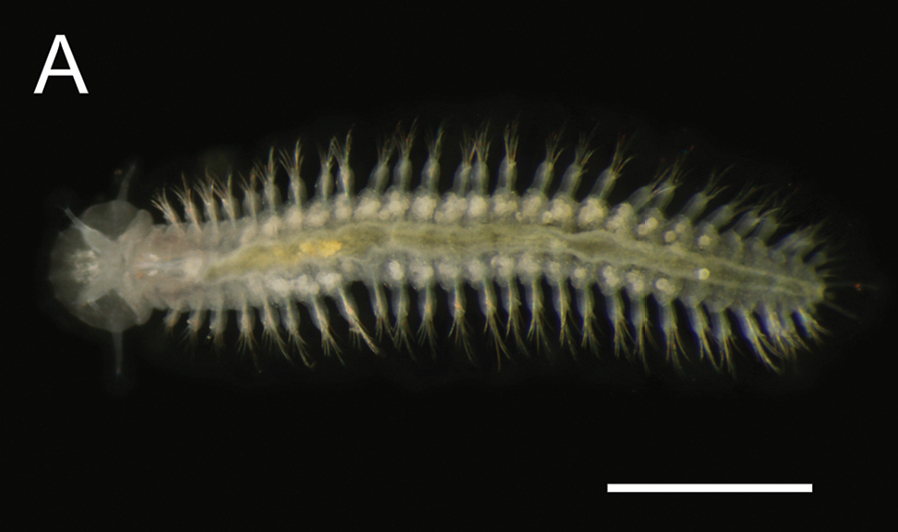
Ophryotrocha cf. batillus (A9610). Scale bar: 1 mm.

Ophryotrocha batillus is a species of polychaete worm, first found on deep sea whale fall and wood fall habitats in the north-east Pacific, off the southern Californian coast. It is very similar to Ophryotrocha scutellus, yet differs from the latter genetically.
