= Ophryotrocha eutrophila =

Scientific classification
- Kingdom: Animalia
- Phylum: Annelida
- Clade: Pleistoannelida
- Subclass: Errantia
- Order: Eunicida
- Family: Dorvilleidae
- Genus: Ophryotrocha
- Species: O. eutrophila

Binomial name
- Ophryotrocha eutrophila Wiklund et al., 2009

Species of annelid

Ophryotrocha eutrophila, is a species of polychaete worm. Ophryotrocha eutrophila is named after its habitat, liking organically enriched environments (eutrophic = “organically”; philus = “like”). This species resembles O. puerilis in jaw morphology. O. eutrophila is dimorphic, with males being than females, while possessing K-type maxillae. Ophryotrocha eutrophila, however, differs from O. puerilis in the absence of eyes and the presence of a developed median pygidial stylus. O. eutrophila is also similar to O. fabriae, differing from the latter from its mandibles morphology.

== Description ==
It is a transparent colour, females possessing eggs larger than the males. Its body is elongated, tapering slightly at the end. Its prostomium counts with digitiform paired antennae inserted dorsally. Its palps are papilliform, inserted laterally on the prostomium. It lacks eyes. Its mandibles are rod-like, with anterior dentition. Its maxillae has 7 pairs of free denticles. It also counts with two peristomial segments without setae, its parapodia being uniramous and showing short dorsal and ventral cirri. Its supraacicular simple chaetae shows distal serration, while subacicular chaetae are compound, its blades showing serration. Its pygidium has a terminal anus, with two pygidial cirri being laterally inserted, as well as an unpaired appendage that is placed ventrally.

== Distribution ==
It was first found in a minke whale carcass at a depth of 125 metres (410 ft) in the Koster area in Sweden.
