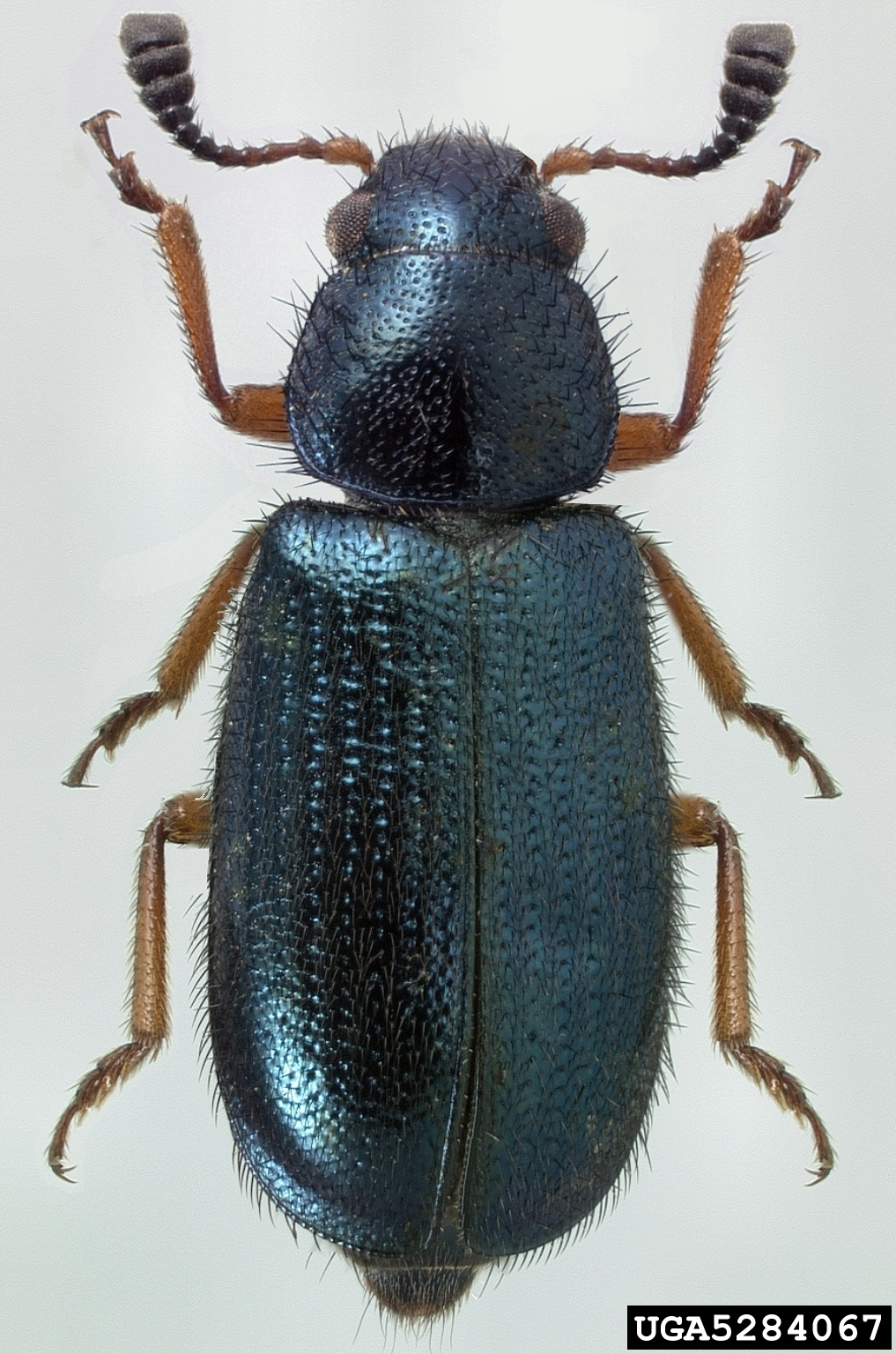

Scientific classification
- Kingdom: Animalia
- Phylum: Arthropoda
- Clade: Pancrustacea
- Class: Insecta
- Order: Coleoptera
- Suborder: Polyphaga
- Infraorder: Cucujiformia
- Family: Cleridae
- Genus: Necrobia
- Species: N. rufipes

Binomial name
- Necrobia rufipes (Fabricius, 1781)

= Necrobia rufipes =

Species of beetle

Necrobia rufipes, the red-legged ham beetle, is a species of predatory beetle, in the family Cleridae, with a cosmopolitan distribution, first described by Charles De Geer in 1775.

The adult beetles are 3.5–7.0 millimetres (0.1–0.3 in) long, convex, straight sided, and the surface has indentations called punctures. They are shiny metallic green or greenish blue. The legs and antennae are red (dark clubs). They feed on the meat-infesting larvae of Calliphora or blow flies, Dermestidae and Piophilidae. The adults are surface feeders; the larvae bore into dry or smoked meats and do most damage. The red-legged ham beetle also attacks bones, hides, copra, dried egg, cheese, guano, bone meal, dried figs, and palm nut kernels. Although refrigeration has reduced the impact of the beetle on meats, they are a significant destructive pest of dried and salt fish including herring. It was well documented as a threat to agriculture by 1925.

Necrobia rufipes has been recorded in Egyptian mummies and were once known as Necrobia mumiarum (Rev. F.W. Hope, 1834).

Two related species are Necrobia violacea which has all-dark legs and antennae, and Necrobia ruficollis, which has light-coloured bases of the elytra (shoulders). Although similar, neither are as destructive as N. rufipes. This species should not be confused with its cousin, Korynetes caeruleus, another steely-blue beetle in the family Cleridae. Both species have a significance in forensic entomology but for different reasons.
