= Ophryotrocha craigsmithi =

Scientific classification
- Kingdom: Animalia
- Phylum: Annelida
- Clade: Pleistoannelida
- Subclass: Errantia
- Order: Eunicida
- Family: Dorvilleidae
- Genus: Ophryotrocha
- Species: O. craigsmithi

Binomial name
- Ophryotrocha craigsmithi Wiklund et al., 2009

Species of annelid

Ophryotrocha craigsmithi is a species of polychaete worm. O. craigsmithi is named after Craig R. Smith. This species is similar to Palpiphitime lipovskyae and O. Platykephale, among others, in having branchial structures dorsally and ventrally. It differs from O. platykephale in the shape of its prostomium and parapodia. Palpiphitime lipovskyae has jaws of both P- and K-type, while no specimens of O. craigsmithi have been found with K-type jaws thus far. Ophryotrocha craigsmithi differs from P. lipovskyae genetically, but also by the presence of a prominent ventral chaetal lobe with a bulging simple chaeta in the former.

== Description ==
It has a pale red or transparent colour, with red branchial structures on its dorsal and ventral sides. It has an elongated body, tapering at its posterior end. Its prostomium has digitiform paired antennae inserted dorsally. Its palps are papilliform and with palpophores, inserted laterally on its prostomium. It possesses no eyes, its mandibles being L-shaped, counting with anterior serration. Its maxillae exhibits 7 free denticles. It also counts with two peristomial segments without setae. Its parapodia has dorsal ventral cirri, with simple supraacicular chaetae and compound subacicular chaetae with serrated blades. Its pygidium has a terminal anus and two pygidial cirri.

== Distribution ==
It was first found in a minke whale carcass at a depth of 125 metres (410 ft) in the Koster area in Sweden, and from sediment between 84 and 150 metres (276 and 492 ft) beneath a fish farm in Hardangerfjord in Norway.
