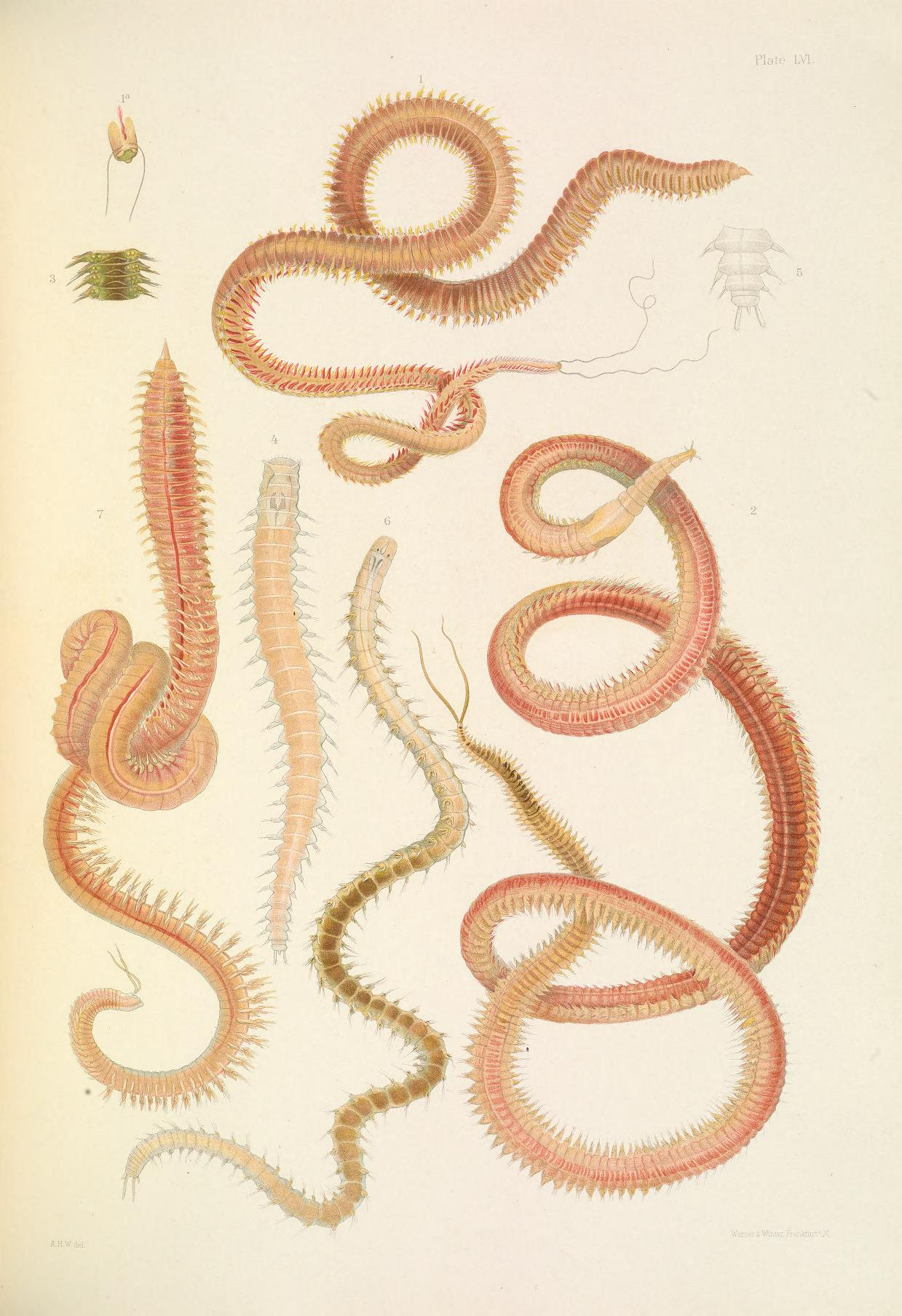
- Ophryotrocha puerilis at bottom right

Scientific classification
- Kingdom: Animalia
- Phylum: Annelida
- Clade: Pleistoannelida
- Subclass: Errantia
- Order: Eunicida
- Family: Dorvilleidae
- Genus: Ophryotrocha
- Species: O. puerilis

Binomial name
- Ophryotrocha puerilis Claparède & Mecznikow, 1869

Synonyms
- Paractius mutabilis Saint-Joseph, 1888; Staurocephalus minimus Langerhans, 1884

= Ophryotrocha puerilis =

Species of annelid worm

Ophryotrocha puerilis is a species of marine polychaete worms in the order Eunicida. It is native to the northern Atlantic Ocean and the Mediterranean Sea and is the type species of the genus Ophryotrocha.

== Biology ==
Ophryotrocha puerilis starts life as a male but later changes sex to female. Under certain circumstances it can change back to a male as a result of environmental cues; it switches sex if two female stages are put together, or if the tail of a female stage is removed, but it remains female if kept in isolation.
