= Ophryotrocha nauarchus =

Scientific classification
- Kingdom: Animalia
- Phylum: Annelida
- Clade: Pleistoannelida
- Subclass: Errantia
- Order: Eunicida
- Family: Dorvilleidae
- Genus: Ophryotrocha
- Species: O. nauarchus

Binomial name
- Ophryotrocha nauarchus Wiklund et al., 2012

Species of Polychaeta

Ophryotrocha nauarchus is a species of polychaete worm, first found on deep sea whale fall and wood fall habitats in the north-east Pacific, off the southern Californian coast. The species is sexually dimorphic, males having appendages on their first chaetiger.
