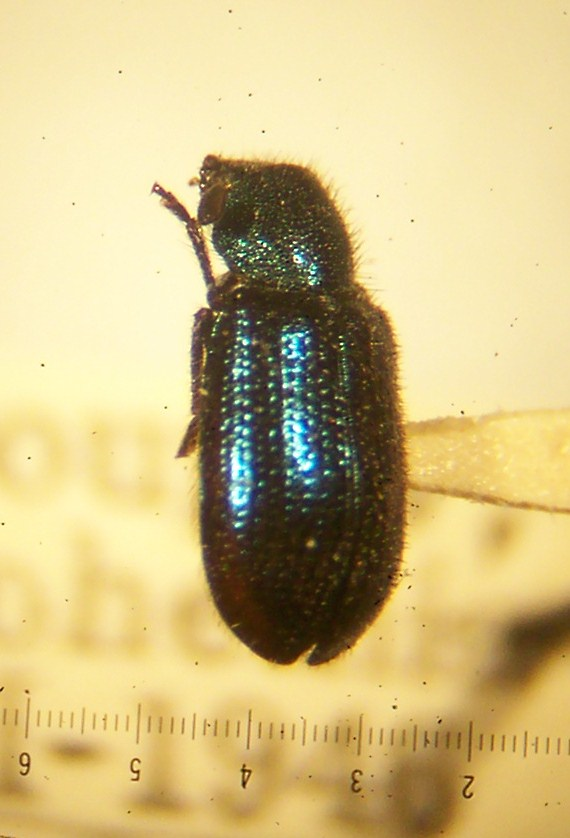
- necrobia_violaxea

Scientific classification
- Domain: Eukaryota
- Kingdom: Animalia
- Phylum: Arthropoda
- Class: Insecta
- Order: Coleoptera
- Suborder: Polyphaga
- Infraorder: Cucujiformia
- Family: Cleridae
- Subfamily: Korynetinae
- Genus: Necrobia; Latreille, 1797

= Necrobia =

Genus of beetles

Necrobia is a genus of beetles belonging to the family Cleridae.

The genus has cosmopolitan distribution.

Species:

- Necrobia divinatoria Wickham, 1914
- Necrobia ruficollis (Fabricius, 1775)
- Necrobia rufipes (De Geer, 1775)
- Necrobia violacea (Linnaeus, 1758)
