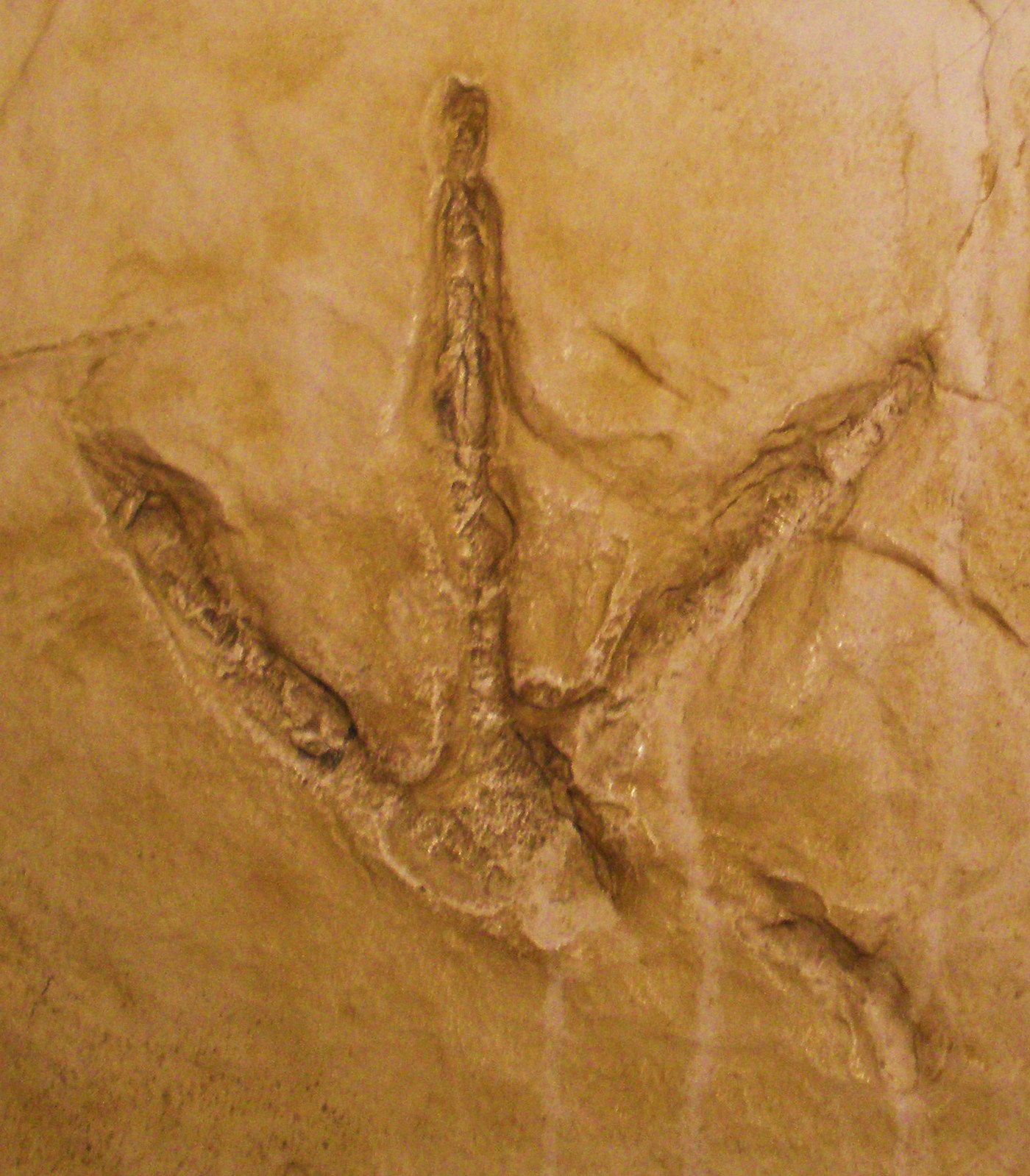
- Saurexallopus zerbsti (holotype CU-MWC 224.2) from the Lance Formation

Trace fossil classification
- Kingdom: Animalia
- Phylum: Chordata
- Class: Reptilia
- Clade: Dinosauria
- Clade: Saurischia
- Clade: Theropoda
- Clade: Maniraptora
- Ichnogenus: †Saurexallopus; Harris, 1997

Type ichnospecies
- †Saurexallopus lovei Harris, 1997

Other species
- †S. cordata McCrea et al., 2014; †S. zerbsti Lockley et al., 2004

Synonyms
- Exallopus lovei Harris et al., 1996

= Saurexallopus =

Saurexallopus Temporal range: Late Cretaceous

Dinosaur footprint

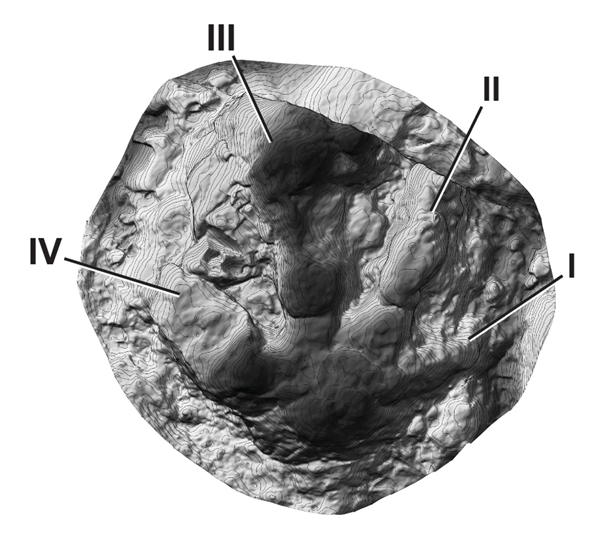
Saurexallopus (DMNH 2010-07-01) from the Cantwell Formation

Saurexallopus (meaning "reptile different foot") is an ichnogenus of four-toed theropod footprints from the Late Cretaceous period. The type ichnospecies is S. lovei, named and described in 1996 from the Harebell Formation. The taxon was originally named Exallopus, but later renamed as Saurexallopus as the former was preoccupied by a polychaete. A second species, S. zerbsti, was named and described in 2004 from the Lance Formation. In 2012 a four-toed track from the Cantwell Formation was referred to Saurexallopus indet. It was also suggested that Saurexallopus was produced by a therizinosaur taxon. In 2013 based on skeletal proportions it was suggested that the ichnotaxon was instead produced by an oviraptorosaur taxon. In 2014 a third species was named, S. cordata, from the Wapiti Formation. In 2018 several tracks from the Blackhawk Formation were referred to Saurexallopus indet. A 2026 study found the type species of the genus S. lovei as a nomen dubium as they are based on penetrative tracks

== See also ==
- List of dinosaur ichnogenera
