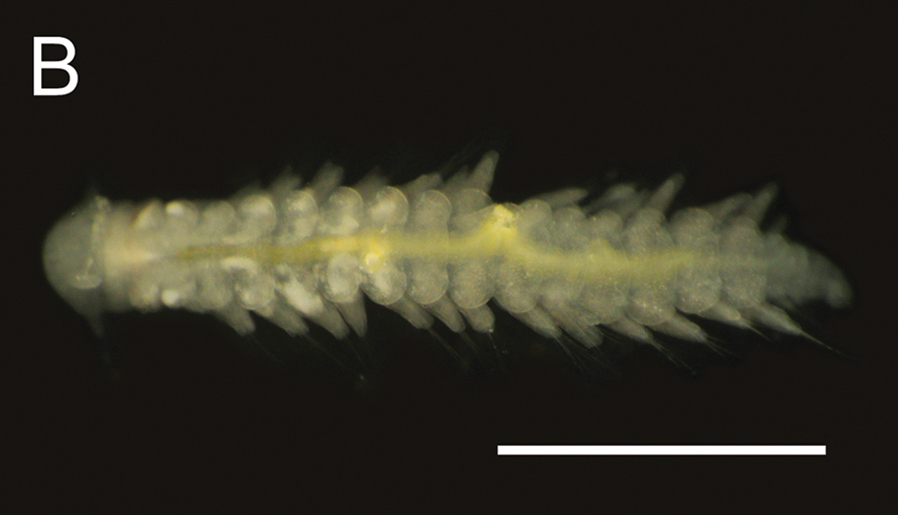

Scientific classification
- Kingdom: Animalia
- Phylum: Annelida
- Clade: Pleistoannelida
- Subclass: Errantia
- Order: Eunicida
- Family: Dorvilleidae
- Genus: Ophryotrocha
- Species: O. flabella

Binomial name
- Ophryotrocha flabella Wiklund et al., 2012

= Ophryotrocha flabella =

Species of Polychaeta

Ophryotrocha flabella is a species of polychaete worm, first found on deep sea whale fall and wood fall habitats in the north-east Pacific, off the southern Californian coast. It is similar to Ophryotrocha globopalpata, possessing some morphological differences, although genetic divergence is low between them.
