= Lumbrineris latreilli =

Scientific classification
- Kingdom: Animalia
- Phylum: Annelida
- Clade: Pleistoannelida
- Subclass: Errantia
- Order: Eunicida
- Family: Lumbrineridae
- Genus: Lumbrineris
- Species: L. latreilli

Binomial name
- Lumbrineris latreilli Audouin & Milne Edwards, 1834

Species of annelid worm

Lumbrineris latreilli is an annelid discovered by Jean-Victor Audouin and Henri Milne-Edwards in 1834.

In appearance they are iridescent; orange, pale pink or brown from different angles. They grow up to 300mm and live mostly in muddy fine sand.

They are a marine species and are found worldwide in temperate waters.
