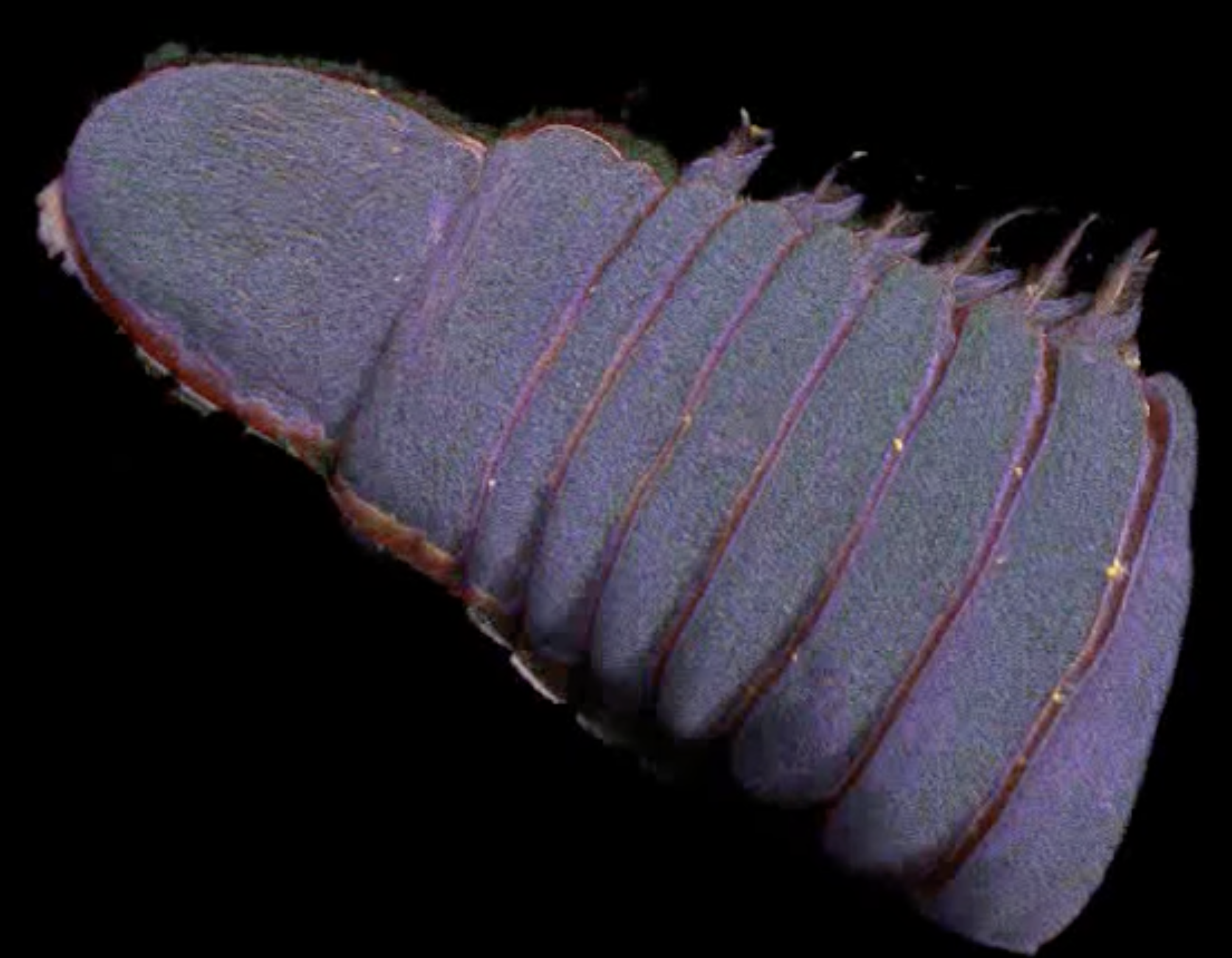
- Lumbrineris latreilli

Scientific classification
- Kingdom: Animalia
- Phylum: Annelida
- Clade: Pleistoannelida
- Subclass: Errantia
- Order: Eunicida
- Family: Lumbrineridae
- Genus: Lumbrineris; Blainville, 1828

= Lumbrineris =

Genus of annelid worms

Lumbrineris is a genus of polychaetes belonging to the family Lumbrineridae.

The genus has cosmopolitan distribution.

Species:

- Lumbrineris aberrans Day, 1963
- Lumbrineris abyssalis Imajima & Higuchi, 1975
- Lumbrineris abyssicola Uschakov, 1950
- Lumbrineris acutiformis Gallardo, 1968
- Lumbrineris acutifrons McIntosh, 1903
- Lumbrineris adriatica (Fauvel, 1940)
- Lumbrineris africana Augener, 1918
- Lumbrineris albifrons Crossland, 1924
- Lumbrineris amboinensis Grube, 1877
- Lumbrineris aniara Fauchald, 1974
- Lumbrineris annulata Hartmann-Schröder, 1960
- Lumbrineris aphanophthalmus (Schmarda, 1861)
- Lumbrineris araukensis Hartmann-Schröder, 1962
- Lumbrineris ater Bidenkap, 1907
- Lumbrineris bassi Hartman, 1944
- Lumbrineris bidens Ehlers, 1887
- Lumbrineris bifilaris Ehlers, 1901
- Lumbrineris bifurcata McIntosh, 1885
- Lumbrineris bilabiata Misra, 1999
- Lumbrineris bipapillifera Kirkegaard, 1988
- Lumbrineris bistriata Levenstein, 1961
- Lumbrineris biuncinata Hartmann-Schröder, 1960
- Lumbrineris brasiliensis Grube, 1857
- Lumbrineris caledonica Pruvot, 1930
- Lumbrineris californiensis Hartman, 1944
- Lumbrineris carpinei Ramos, 1976
- Lumbrineris caudaensis Gallardo, 1968
- Lumbrineris cavifrons Grube, 1866
- Lumbrineris cedroensis Fauchald, 1970
- Lumbrineris cervicalis Treadwell, 1922
- Lumbrineris chilensis Kinberg, 1865
- Lumbrineris cingulata Ehlers, 1897
- Lumbrineris cluthensis Clark, 1953
- Lumbrineris coccinea (Renier, 1804)
- Lumbrineris composita Hartmann-Schröder, 1965
- Lumbrineris contorta Quatrefages, 1866
- Lumbrineris crassicephala Hartman, 1965
- Lumbrineris crassidentata Fauchald, 1970
- Lumbrineris crosnieri Carrera-Parra, 2006
- Lumbrineris crosslandi Perkins, 1979
- Lumbrineris cruzensis Hartman, 1944
- Lumbrineris debilis Grube, 1878
- Lumbrineris dentata Hartmann-Schröder, 1965
- Lumbrineris descendens (Chamberlin, 1919)
- Lumbrineris duebeni Kinberg, 1865
- Lumbrineris ebranchiata (Pallas, 1788)
- Lumbrineris ehlersii McIntosh, 1885
- Lumbrineris erecta Moore, 1904
- Lumbrineris ernesti Perkins, 1979
- Lumbrineris eugeniae Fauchald, 1970
- Lumbrineris ezoensis Uchida, 1968
- Lumbrineris fauchaldi Blake, 1972
- Lumbrineris fossilis Szaniawski & Wrona, 1987
- Lumbrineris frauenfeldi Grube, 1868
- Lumbrineris futilis Kinberg, 1865
- Lumbrineris geldiayi Carrera-Parra, Çinar & Dagli, 2011
- Lumbrineris grandis Treadwell, 1906
- Lumbrineris gulielmi Benham, 1915
- Lumbrineris hartmani Day, 1953
- Lumbrineris hemprichii Grube, 1870
- Lumbrineris heterochaeta (Schmarda, 1861)
- Lumbrineris higuchiae Carrera-Parra, 2006
- Lumbrineris homodentata Hartmann-Schröder, 1965
- Lumbrineris humilis Quatrefages, 1866
- Lumbrineris imajimai Carrera-Parra, 2006
- Lumbrineris index Moore, 1911
- Lumbrineris indica Kinberg, 1865
- Lumbrineris inflata Moore, 1911
- Lumbrineris inhacae 1974
- Lumbrineris inhacae Hartman, 1976
- Lumbrineris janeirensis Augener, 1934
- Lumbrineris januarii Grube, 1878
- Lumbrineris japonica Marenzeller, 1879
- Lumbrineris kerguelensis Grube, 1878
- Lumbrineris knipovichana Orenzanz, 1973
- Lumbrineris knoxi Carrera-Parra, 2006
- Lumbrineris labrofimbriata Saint-Joseph, 1888
- Lumbrineris latreilli Audouin & Milne Edwards, 1833
- Lumbrineris levinseni Bidenkap, 1907
- Lumbrineris ligulata Berkeley & Berkeley, 1941
- Lumbrineris limbata Hartmann-Schröder, 1965
- Lumbrineris limicola Hartman, 1944
- Lumbrineris lobata Hartmann-Schröder, 1960
- Lumbrineris longensis Hartman, 1960
- Lumbrineris longifolia Imajima & Higuchi, 1975
- Lumbrineris longipodiata Cantone, 1990
- Lumbrineris lucida Grube, 1877
- Lumbrineris luciliae Martins, Carrera-Parra, Quintino & Rodrigues, 2012
- Lumbrineris lumbricalis (Blainville, 1825)
- Lumbrineris lusitanica Martins, Carrera-Parra, Quintino & Rodrigues, 2012
- Lumbrineris luti Berkeley & Berkeley, 1945
- Lumbrineris macquariensis Benham, 1921
- Lumbrineris maculata Treadwell, 1901
- Lumbrineris magalhaensis Kinberg, 1865
- Lumbrineris magnanuchalata Hartmann-Schröder, 1959
- Lumbrineris magnapalpa Hartmann-Schröder, 1965
- Lumbrineris malaysiae Rullier, 1969
- Lumbrineris mando Crossland, 1924
- Lumbrineris maxillosa Ehlers, 1918
- Lumbrineris meteorana Augener, 1931
- Lumbrineris minima Hartman, 1944
- Lumbrineris minuscula Moore, 1911
- Lumbrineris minuta (Théel, 1879)
- Lumbrineris mirabilis Kinberg, 1865
- Lumbrineris mixochaeta Oug, 1998
- Lumbrineris monroi Fauchald, 1970
- Lumbrineris moorei Hartman, 1942
- Lumbrineris mustaquimi Carrera-Parra, 2006
- Lumbrineris nagae Gallardo, 1968
- Lumbrineris neozealaniae McIntosh, 1885
- Lumbrineris nishii Carrera-Parra, 2006
- Lumbrineris nonatoi Ramos, 1976
- Lumbrineris nuchalis Treadwell, 1921
- Lumbrineris obscura Quatrefages, 1866
- Lumbrineris obtusa Kinberg, 1865
- Lumbrineris oceanica Kinberg, 1865
- Lumbrineris ocellata Grube, 1878
- Lumbrineris oculata Ehlers, 1908
- Lumbrineris orensanzi Hartmann-Schröder, 1980
- Lumbrineris oxychaeta Gravier, 1900
- Lumbrineris pallida Hartman, 1944
- Lumbrineris papillifera Fauvel, 1918
- Lumbrineris parvapedata Treadwell, 1901
- Lumbrineris patagonica Hartmann-Schröder, 1962
- Lumbrineris paucidentata Treadwell, 1921
- Lumbrineris pectinifera Quatrefages, 1843
- Lumbrineris penascensis Fauchald, 1970
- Lumbrineris perkinsi Carrera-Parra, 2001
- Lumbrineris pinaster Martins, Carrera-Parra, Quintino & Rodrigues, 2012
- Lumbrineris platylobata Fauchald, 1970
- Lumbrineris platypygos Fauchald, 1970
- Lumbrineris polydesma Southern, 1921
- Lumbrineris pseudobifilaris Fauvel, 1932
- Lumbrineris pseudopolydesma Pillai, 1961
- Lumbrineris pterignatha Gallardo, 1968
- Lumbrineris quasibifilaris Monro, 1937
- Lumbrineris quinquedentata Kinberg, 1865
- Lumbrineris reunionensis Carrera-Parra, 2006
- Lumbrineris rovignensis Fauvel, 1940
- Lumbrineris salazari Carrera-Parra, 2001
- Lumbrineris sarsi Kinberg, 1865
- Lumbrineris scolopendrina (Blainville, 1825)
- Lumbrineris setosa Hartmann-Schröder, 1987
- Lumbrineris shiinoi Gallardo, 1968
- Lumbrineris similabris Treadwell, 1926
- Lumbrineris simplex Southern, 1921
- Lumbrineris simplicis Hartman, 1959
- Lumbrineris sinensis Cai & Li, 2011
- Lumbrineris sphaerocephala (Schmarda, 1861)
- Lumbrineris striata Hartmann-Schröder, 1962
- Lumbrineris testudinum Augener, 1922
- Lumbrineris treadwelli Hartman, 1956
- Lumbrineris trigonocephala (Schmarda, 1861)
- Lumbrineris uncinigera Hartmann-Schröder, 1959
- Lumbrineris vanhoeffeni Michaelsen, 1898
- Lumbrineris variegatus Bidenkap, 1895
- Lumbrineris versicolor (Gmelin, 1788)
- Lumbrineris vincentis Grube, 1878
- Lumbrineris virgini Kinberg, 1865
- Lumbrineris zatsepini Averincev, 1989
