= Exallopus =

Scientific classification
- Kingdom: Animalia
- Phylum: Annelida
- Clade: Pleistoannelida
- Subclass: Errantia
- Order: Eunicida
- Family: Dorvilleidae
- Genus: Exallopus; Jumars, 1974

Genus of annelids

Exallopus is a genus of polychaetes belonging to the family Dorvilleidae.

The species of this genus are found in Northern America.

Species:

- Exallopus blakei Hilbig, 1991
- Exallopus cropion Jumars, 1974
- Exallopus intermedia Hilbig & Blake, 1991
- Exallopus jumarsi Blake, 1985
- Exallopus pentadiaphorus Hilbig, 1991
