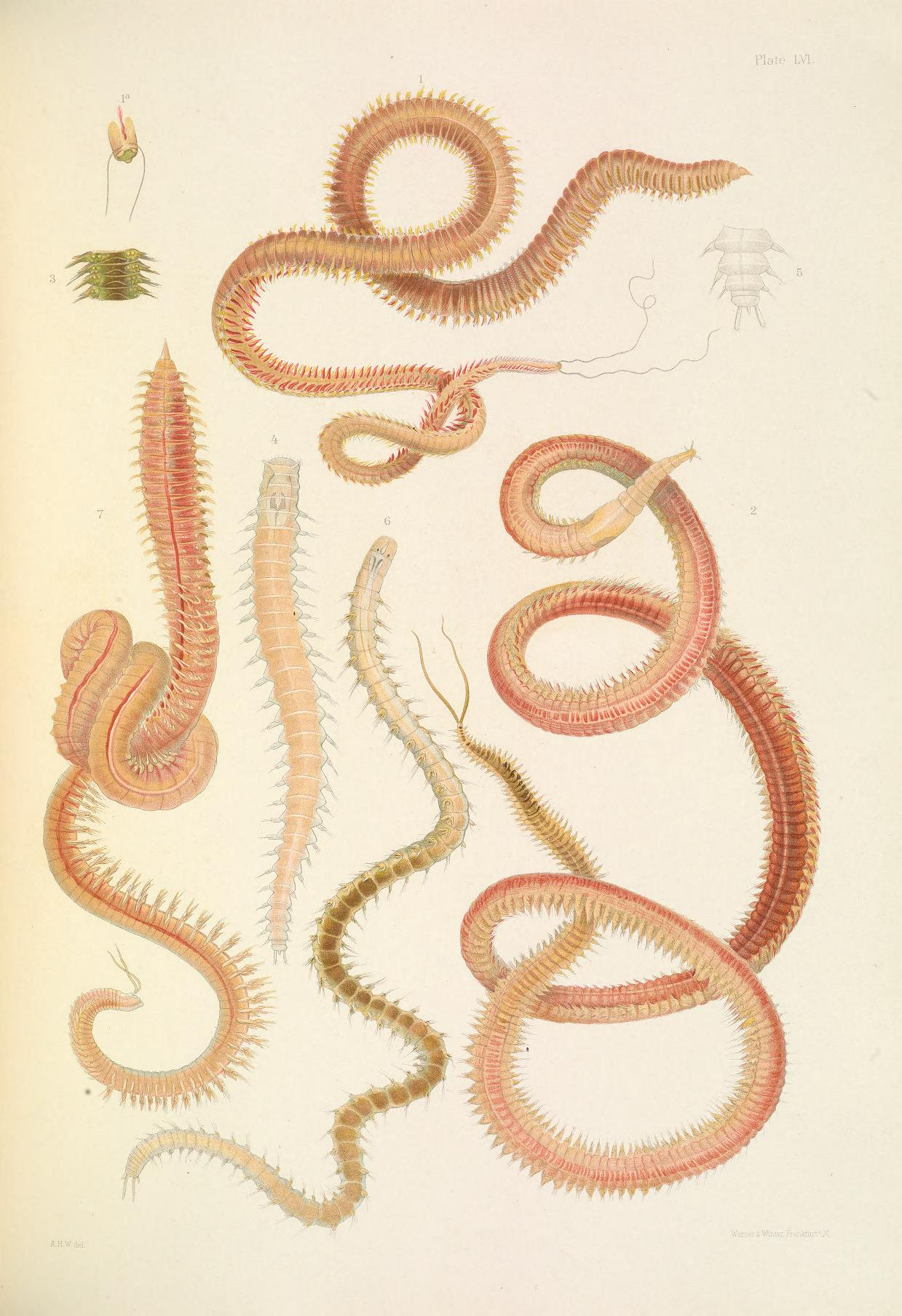
- Ophryotrocha puerilis

Scientific classification
- Kingdom: Animalia
- Phylum: Annelida
- Clade: Pleistoannelida
- Subclass: Errantia
- Order: Eunicida
- Family: Dorvilleidae
- Genus: Ophryotrocha; Claparède & Mecznikow, 1869

Species
- See text

= Ophryotrocha =

Genus of annelid worms

Ophryotrocha is a genus of marine polychaete worms in the family Dorvilleidae.

Ophryotrocha comprises a multitude of extant species of polychaete worms with more thought to exist in both shallow and deep waters. Polychaetes of this genus thrive in nutrient-rich environments and can often be found in polluted marine areas that are often sites of human activity.Ophryotrocha's durability allows them to exist in a myriad of stressful environments. Found in the oceans surrounding Europe, Asia, the Mediterranean, and beyond, they can survive in low-oxygen environments and are known to be sulfide tolerant, allowing this genus to live in areas most species cannot. Most worms are between 1 and 5 mm in length, but some deep sea species have been documented to be much larger, ranging from 10 and 25mm. Ophryotrocha is often used as a scientific test species due to their high fecundity, stress tolerance, and myriad of sexual systems found within the genus.

All polychaetes of this genus are laid in batches of roughly 100 eggs and the majority of species start out in a free-moving larval stage as protandrous hermaphrodites. During the protandrist stage of adolescence, small males will start producing sperm when the body length is still small but will continue to stay male if females are present in an effort to avoid the energetic costs of producing oocytes. As this genus continues to grow they develop into tube-building sessile adults. Although no study has documented their entire life process, all Ophryotrocha are documented to breed and die after the dispersal of offspring with parental care given to eggs by one or both sexes resting on the egg cocoon. Parental care is thought to act as a mode for cleaning the cocoon and is documented in all studied species within the genus.

== Species ==
The World Register of Marine Species lists the following species in the genus:

- Ophryotrocha adherens Paavo, Bailey-Brock & Akesson, 2000
- Ophryotrocha akessoni Blake, 1985
- Ophryotrocha alborana Paxton & Åkesson, 2011
- Ophryotrocha antarctica Szaniawski & Wrona, 1987
- Ophryotrocha atlantica Hilbig & Blake, 1991
- Ophryotrocha baccii Parenti, 1961
- Ophryotrocha batillus Wiklund et al., 2012
- Ophryotrocha bifida Hilbig & Blake, 1991
- Ophryotrocha birgittae Paxton & Åkesson, 2011
- Ophryotrocha cantabrica Núñez, Riera & Maggio, 2014
- Ophryotrocha claparedei Studer, 1878
- Ophryotrocha clava Taboada, Wiklund, Glover, Dahlgren, Cristobo & Avila, 2013
- Ophryotrocha cosmetandra Oug, 1990
- Ophryotrocha costlowi Paxton & Åkesson, 2010
- Ophryotrocha craigsmithi Wiklund, Glover & Dahlgren, 2009
- Ophryotrocha cyclops Salvo, Wiklund, Dufour, Hamoutene, Pohle & Worsaae, 2014
- Ophryotrocha diadema Åkesson, 1976
- Ophryotrocha dimorphica Zavarzina & Tsetlin, 1986
- Ophryotrocha dubia Hartmann-Schröder, 1974
- Ophryotrocha eutrophila Wiklund, Glover & Dahlgren, 2009
- Ophryotrocha fabriae Paxton & Morineaux, 2009
- Ophryotrocha flabella Wiklund et al., 2012
- Ophryotrocha gerlachi Hartmann-Schröder, 1974
- Ophryotrocha geryonicola (Esmark, 1878)
- Ophryotrocha globopalpata Blake & Hilbig, 1990
- Ophryotrocha gracilis Huth, 1933
- Ophryotrocha hadalis Jumars, 1974
- Ophryotrocha hartmanni Huth, 1933
- Ophryotrocha irinae Tsetlin, 1980
- Ophryotrocha japonica Paxton & Åkesson, 2010
- Ophryotrocha jiaolongi Zhang, Zhou, Wang & Rouse, 2017
- Ophryotrocha kagoshimaensis Miura, 1997
- Ophryotrocha labidion Hilbig & Blake, 1991
- Ophryotrocha labronica Bacci & La Greca, 1961
- Ophryotrocha langstrumpae Wiklund et al., 2012
- Ophryotrocha lipovskyae (Paxton, 2009)
- Ophryotrocha lipscombae Lu & Fauchald, 2000
- Ophryotrocha littoralis (Levinsen, 1879)
- Ophryotrocha lobifera Oug, 1978
- Ophryotrocha longicollaris Wiklund et al., 2012
- Ophryotrocha longidentata Josefson, 1975
- Ophryotrocha lukowensis Szaniawski, 1974
- Ophryotrocha lusa Ravara, Marçal, Wiklund & Hilário, 2015
- Ophryotrocha maciolekae Hilbig & Blake, 1991
- Ophryotrocha macrovifera Paxton & Åkesson, 2010
- Ophryotrocha maculata Åkesson, 1973
- Ophryotrocha magnadentata Wiklund et al., 2012
- Ophryotrocha mammillata Ravara, Marçal, Wiklund & Hilário, 2015
- Ophryotrocha mandibulata Hilbig & Blake, 1991
- Ophryotrocha mediterranea Martin, Abello & Cartes, 1991
- Ophryotrocha minuta Levi, 1954
- Ophryotrocha natans Pfannenstiel, 1975
- Ophryotrocha nauarchus Wiklund et al., 2012
- Ophryotrocha notialis (Ehlers, 1908)
- Ophryotrocha notoglandulata Pfannenstiel, 1972
- Ophryotrocha obtusa Hilbig & Blake, 1991
- Ophryotrocha orensanzi Taboada, Wiklund, Glover, Dahlgren, Cristobo & Avila, 2013
- Ophryotrocha pachysoma Hilbig & Blake, 1991
- Ophryotrocha paragerlachi Brito & Nunez, 2003
- Ophryotrocha paralabidion Hilbig & Blake, 1991
- Ophryotrocha permanae Paxton & Åkesson, 2010
- Ophryotrocha platykephale Blake, 1985
- Ophryotrocha puerilis Claparède & Mecznikow, 1869
- Ophryotrocha robusta Paxton & Åkesson, 2010
- Ophryotrocha rubra Paxton & Åkesson, 2010
- Ophryotrocha sadina Ravara, Marçal, Wiklund & Hilário, 2015
- Ophryotrocha scarlatoi Averincev, 1989
- Ophryotrocha schubravyi Tsetlin, 1980
- Ophryotrocha scutellus Wiklund, Glover & Dahlgren, 2009
- Ophryotrocha shieldsi Paxton & Davey, 2010
- Ophryotrocha socialis Ockelmann & Akesson, 1990
- Ophryotrocha spatula Fournier & Conlan, 1994
- Ophryotrocha splendida Brito & Nunez, 2003
- Ophryotrocha vellae Paxton & Åkesson, 2010
- Ophryotrocha vivipara Banse, 1963
- Ophryotrocha wubaolingi Miura, 1997

== Sexual systems ==
The many species of polychaete worms within the genus Ophryotrocha exhibit a variety of sexual systems. Distinct species demonstrate different systems, with simultaneous hermaphroditism, gonochorism, and sequential hermaphroditism all documented. The ancestral state of this genus of worms is known to be simultaneous hermaphroditism. Generally, the simultaneous hermaphroditic species are protandrous as adolescents and mate in pairs. The formation of pairs is decided by a long courtship process where partners are linked together in a pseudocopulation. In simultaneous hermaphrodites, each adult has a pair of gonads that produce gametes which are emitted into the water column where external fertilization occurs. After courtship, both simultaneous hermaphroditic individuals repeat the process of egg-laying and fertilizing (known as egg trading to avoid sexual conflict between the two simultaneous hermaphrodites. As with many hermaphroditic species, Ophryotrocha polychaetes are thought to have evolved simultaneous hermaphroditism as an ancestral state because of lack of mate access to allow sexually viable individuals to produce offspring without sex barriers blocking reproduction opportunities as this genus cannot self-fertilize.
