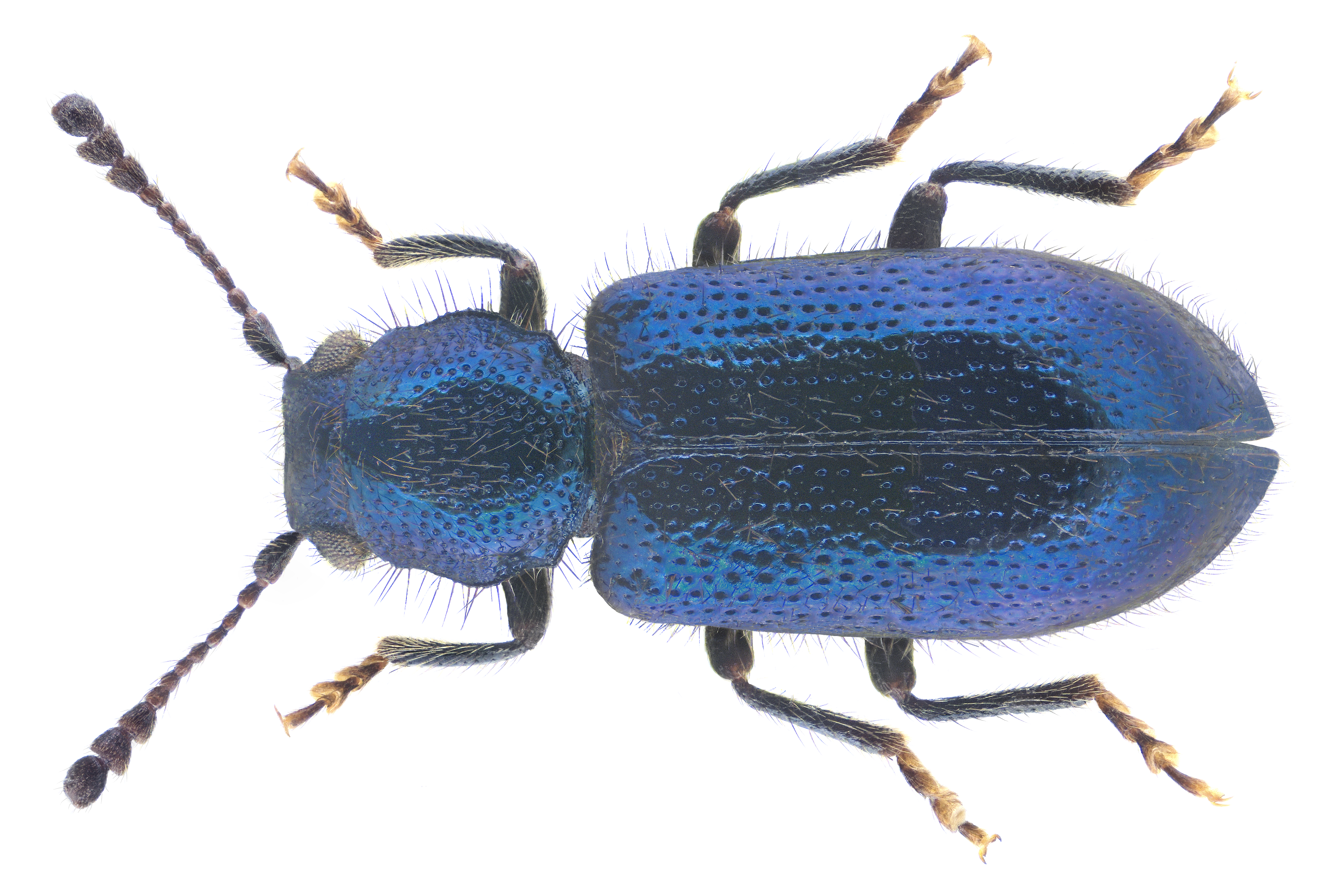

Scientific classification
- Kingdom: Animalia
- Phylum: Arthropoda
- Class: Insecta
- Order: Coleoptera
- Suborder: Polyphaga
- Infraorder: Cucujiformia
- Family: Cleridae
- Genus: Korynetes
- Species: K. caeruleus

Binomial name
- Korynetes caeruleus (De Geer, 1775)

Synonyms
- Clerus caeruleus DeGeer, 1775; Attelabus geoffroyanus Laicharting, 1783; Clerus nigrocoeruleus Geoffroy, 1799; Korynetes coeruleus (DeGeer, 1775) (Missp.); Korynetes cyanellus Dejean, 1837; Korynetes unicolor Chevrolat, 1876; Korynetes meridionalis Obenberger, 1916; Korynetes obenbergeri Jansson, 1936

= Korynetes caeruleus =

Species of beetle

Korynetes caeruleus, also known as the steely blue beetle, is a predatory beetle in the family Cleridae. The species name is occasionally misspelled as "coeruleus" (e.g.,), but the spelling caeruleus is preserved by Opinion 604 of the ICZN, issued in 1961.

The adult is between 3.5 and 6.5 mm (0.14 and 0.26 in) long, has reddish-brown antennae, a scantily spotted brown head and neck shield, and shiny blue elytra. The larvae live in tunnelled wood that has been infested by the common furniture beetle and the deathwatch beetle and they feed on the larvae of these wood-damaging insects. The presence of Korynetes caeruleus indicates a heavy infestation of either woodboring insect. Adult females mate and lay eggs near or just inside exit holes, then die. It is not to be confused with Necrobia violacea, which is also a steely blue beetle in the family Cleridae. Both beetles have a significance in forensic entomology but for different reasons.
