= Pinyon Conglomerate =

Geologic formation in Wyoming

- Stratigraphic range: Maastrichtian–Paleocene
- Type: Geological formation
- Underlies: Harebell Formation

Location
- Region: North America
- Extent: Yellowstone National Park

The Pinyon Conglomerate is a geological formation in Wyoming whose strata date back to the Late Cretaceous and Paleocene. Dinosaur remains are among the fossils that have been recovered from the formation.

== Vertebrate paleofauna ==
- Leptoceratops sp.

== See also ==
- List of dinosaur-bearing rock formations
