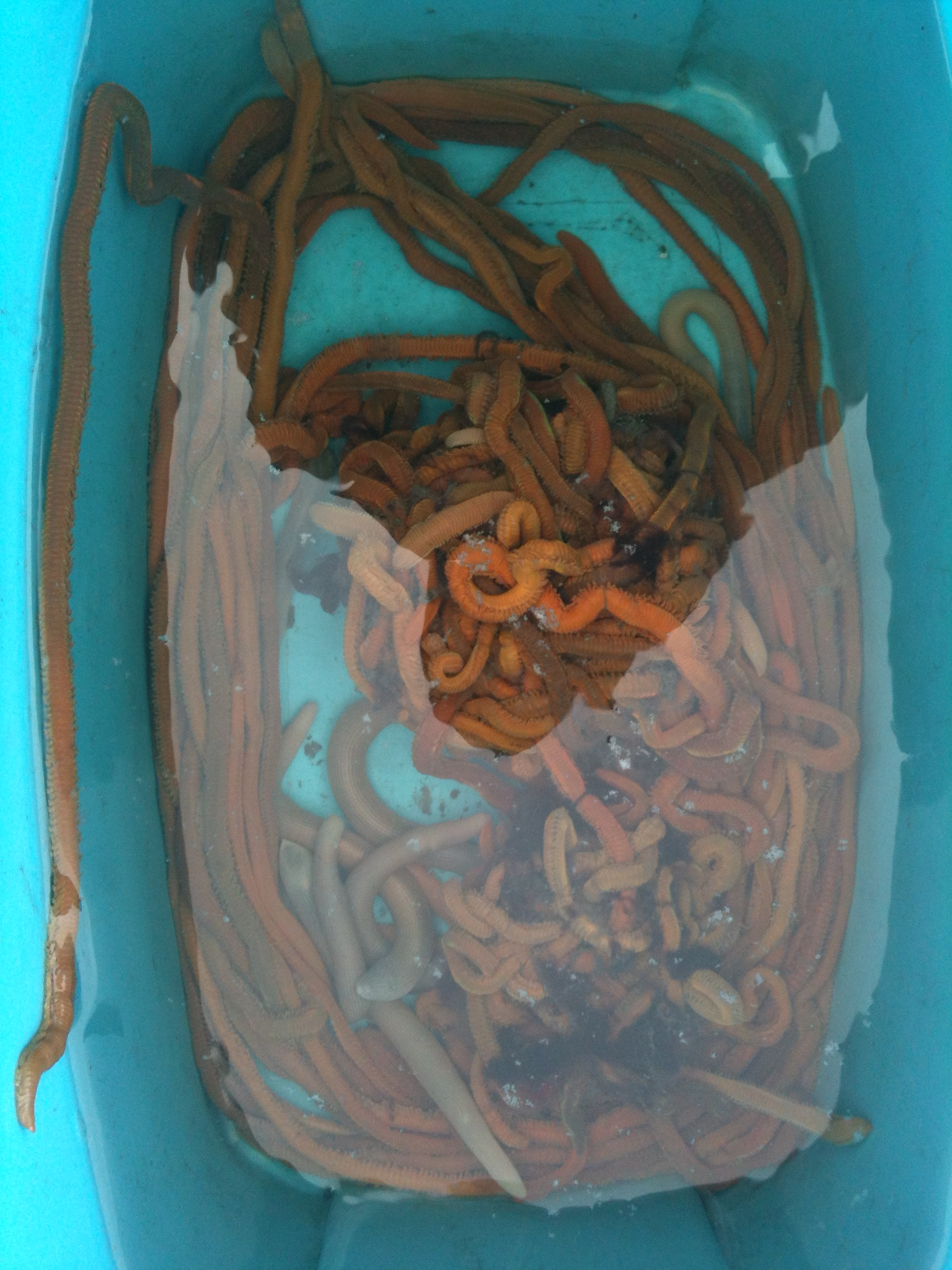
- Halla parthenopeia

Scientific classification
- Kingdom: Animalia
- Phylum: Annelida
- Clade: Pleistoannelida
- Subclass: Errantia
- Order: Eunicida
- Family: Oenonidae

Synonyms
- Arabellidae

= Oenonidae =

Family of annelids

Oenonidae is a family of polychaetes belonging to the order Eunicida.

== Genera ==
- Arabella Grube, 1850
- Arabelloneris Hartmann-Schröder in Hartmann-Schroder & Hartmann, 1979
- Biborin Chamberlin, 1919
- Danymene Kinberg, 1864
- Drilognathus Day, 1960
- Drilonereis Claparède, 1870
- Haematocleptes Wirén, 1886
- Halla A. Costa, 1844
- Labidognathus Caullery, 1914
- Labrorostratus Saint-Joseph, 1888
- Lais Kinberg, 1865
- Laranda Kinberg, 1865
- Larymna Kinberg, 1864
- Notocirrus Schmarda, 1861
- Oenone Savigny, 1818
- Oligognathus Spengel, 1881
- Pholadiphila Dean, 1992
- Plioceras Quatrefages, 1865
- Tainokia Knox & Green, 1972
