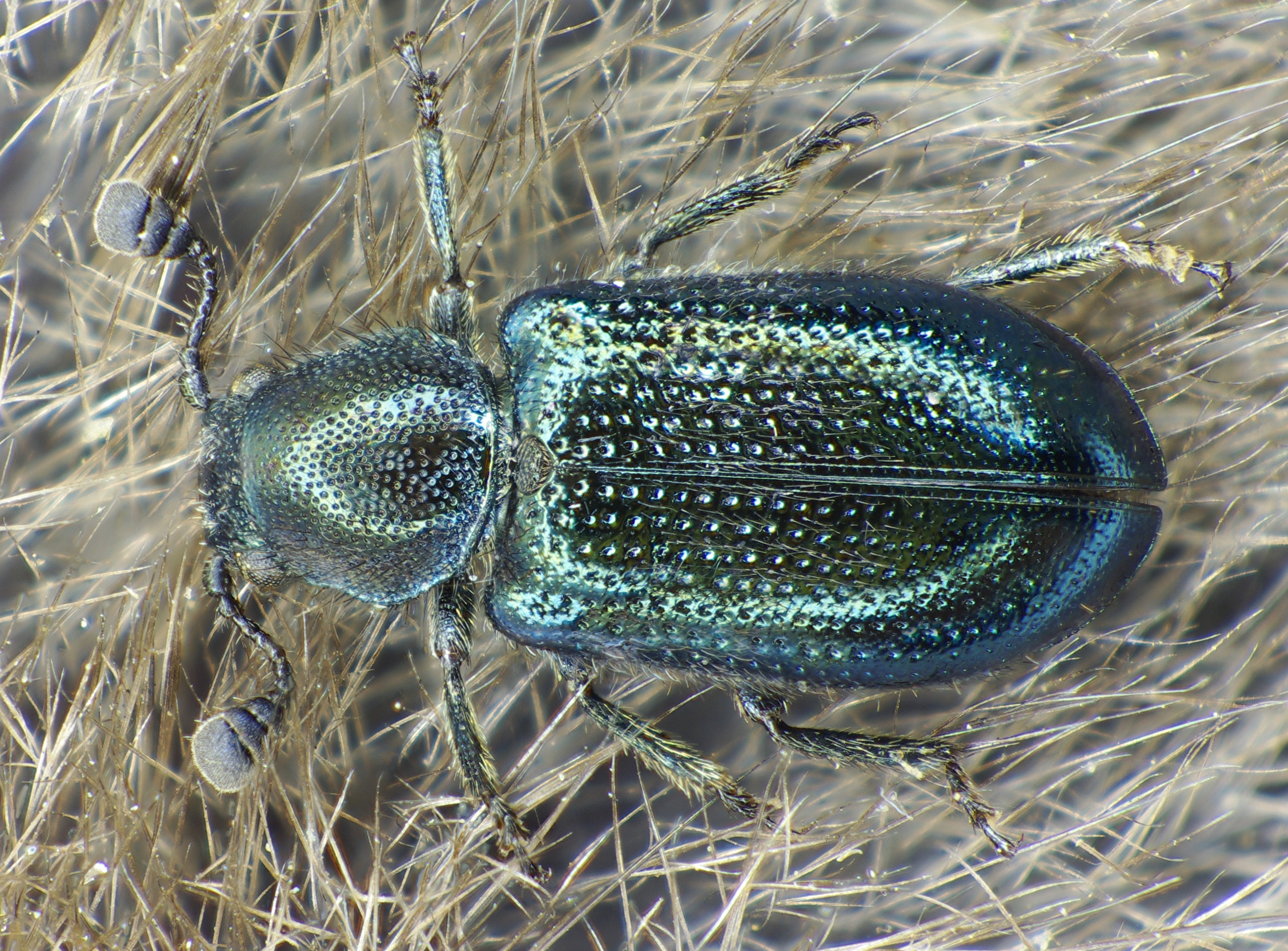

Scientific classification
- Kingdom: Animalia
- Phylum: Arthropoda
- Class: Insecta
- Order: Coleoptera
- Suborder: Polyphaga
- Infraorder: Cucujiformia
- Family: Cleridae
- Genus: Necrobia
- Species: N. violacea

Binomial name
- Necrobia violacea (Linnaeus, 1758)

= Necrobia violacea =

Species of beetle

Necrobia violacea (otherwise known as the blacklegged ham beetle) is a species of beetle in family Cleridae. Cleridae beetles are a predaceous beetle found within forest and woodland environments, and can be associated with stored food products as both pests and predators of other insects.

Necrobia violacea can be found in the Palearctic region. The beetle is also referred to as the blue ham beetle and the cosmopolitan blue bone beetle. It is from the subfamily Korynetinae, and genus Necrobia Olivier It is uniformly metallic shiny green or blue.

== Naming etymology ==
Within the Cleridae family are three forms of Necrobia beetle including Necrobia rufipes (redlegged ham beetle), Necrobia ruficollis (redshouldered ham beetle), and Necrobia violacea (blacklegged ham beetle).

The species name violacea is derived from the Latin "violācĕus, a, um" meaning "violet", and refers to the beetle's blue color. The genus name Necróbia, according to Schenkling from Altgr., is derived from "νεκρός nekrós", meaning 'dead', and "βίος.", meaning bíos or place of residence, suggesting that the genus typically inhabits animal-based substances.

The name Necrobia (derived from the words "nekrós the dead and "βίος bíos life" meaning "the dead life") was given to the species by French sources to commemorate how this beetle, Necrobia ruficollis, saved the life of the French entomologist Latreille. During the French Revolution, Latreille was among the conservative Catholic clergy who refused to recognize the civil constitution and was due to be deported to French Guiana. Whilst in Bordeaux prison, Latreille discovered the beetle, which had previously been described by Fabricius in 1775 as part of the Dermestes genus. In 1795, the species was separated from the genus Dermestes and placed within its own genus, Necrobia.

The name "blue ham beetle" is derived from the species' blue legs, in comparison to the red-legged ham beetle Necrobia rufipes that is sometimes found on ham. The name, "piston beetle," is derived from the round antennae of the beetle and its association with the beetle family.

The species has numerous synonyms:

- Corynetes chalibea Storm 1837
- Corynetes dalamatina Obenberger 1916
- Corynetes jablanicensis Obenberger 1916
- Clerus quadra Marsham 1802
- Corynetes angustata Falderman 1835
- Necrobia errans Melsheimer 1846

== Description ==
This beetle is quite small, measuring only four to five millimeters in length. It is roughly 2.5 times longer than it is wide, has a slightly curved shape, and has a iridescent metallic blue-green to green hue across its body, including its legs.

It has long protruding hair, partly with different types of hair (double hair).

The triangular head with bulging eyes can be pulled back slightly into the pronotum. The terminal segment of the jaw palpi is not shaped like an axe as in the Korynetes violaceus species, but is spindle-shaped and truncated. The eleven-proved antennae are completely black and terminate in a three-lobed, wide and flattened club. The last link of the attennae is notably bigger than the penultimate link, and the club is more condensed than the club of Korynetes.

The pronotum of this species is not evenly curved like Korynetes, but rather widens in a relatively straight line towards the back, making it wider in the last third than the head. The base is curved and ends in pointed posterior angles at the sides, and is edged and coarsely punctured, more so than Korynetes.

The elytra is wider at the front than at the pronotum, and gradually widens until it reaches its fullest width in the last half. Its shape is generally semicircular, with elongated dots throughout that become less visible as they reach the end. The species is double-haired including fair and coarse hairs. The darker and longer hairs slant forward, whilst the lighter, shorter, and thinner hairs slant backward. The pronotum also has two types of hairs, though the fairer hairs are harder to discern between the darker hairs that stand out more prominently.

The leg hairs of the creature range from blue to black. The tarsi, or segments of the leg, consist of five joints, though they appear to have four since the fourth joint is small and tucked away in the cavity of the third joint. The claws at the end of the legs are serrated at the base.

The genitalia of this species are much different from that of other studied families. The phallus and phallobasic apodem have been found to be very long, almost twice as long or more than the tegmen. The external gender differences are not known.

== Larvae ==
Eggs of the adult beetle are laid on a surface. Larvae burrow into the material of the commodity surface they are laid upon. Larvae have an elongated shape, marked by three pairs of jointed legs. The head, first thoracic segment, and part of the last abdominal segment are sclerotized, while the remaining segments have a soft-skinned, marbled exterior. At the end of the abdomen is a pincer-shaped appendage called the urogomph, which is attached to a sclerotized plate that leaves the base of the last abdominal segment exposed. There is no outgrowth in front of the urogomph, and the upper jaw's inner edge is not serrated. The lower jaw is pulled back just below the head, and the cardo and stipes are roughly the same size.

At the point of pupation, they create a cucoon either in the infested commodity or in a tunnel they have bored elsewhere. In contrast to Necrobia rufipes, the larvae do not consume carrion, but do predate on the larvae of other insects that are found on the carcass, such as those belonging to the species of skin beetle in the genus Dermestes. In laboratory tests, it was shown that the larvae also feed inside the pupae of flies of the genus Sarcophaga.

== Biology ==
The imagines (the stage in which the insect attains maturity) occur everywhere where remnants of carrion can be found. They are long lived and under warm conditions will fly in search of food. The species can be found among stored dried meat products, dry bones, rawhide, dried fish, as well as insect and mite-infested carcasses. It is common to find the beetle feeding on oilseeds, aged cheeses, dried, cured or smoked meat products and bacon. The beetle is also regularly found in forensic studies of older bodies exposed to the elements.

The beetle is rarely of relevance to forensic science due to their preference for corpses in advanced stages of decomposition. Furthermore, the beetle is noted by sources to have the same food preferences as the Piophila casei fly.

Studies in Switzerland have confirmed the appearance of imagines during the fourth stage of body decomposition (ammoniacal decay) and were found on desiccated carcasses. This corresponds to a period of five to nine months after death. A period of 25 to 35 days is assumed for the development period of the beetle larvae.
