= Harebell Formation =

Mesozoic geologic formation in Wyoming, US

- Stratigraphic range: Maastrichtian, ~70.3–68.2 Ma
- Type: Geological formation
- Underlies: Pinyon Conglomerate

Location
- Extent: Yellowstone National Park (Big Game Ridge)

The Harebell Formation is a Late Cretaceous (Maastrichtian) geologic formation in Wyoming which outcrops in parts of the Yellowstone National Park. Dinosaur remains diagnostic to the genus level are among the fossils that have been recovered from the formation.

== Discovery of the first dinosaur found in Yellowstone ==
In 1966, Joseph Leonard Weitz discovered specimen USNM PAL 768805, a right distal premaxillary tooth of a tyrannosaur, from Big Game Ridge, an outcrop of the Harebell Formation within Yellowstone National Park and catalogued it as specimen W-66-1-8A until it was moved to the United States Geological Survey Paleontology collection in Denver, Colorado and was catalogued as specimen D704.

A letter dated 16 November 1966 from J. D. Love to Dr. G. Edward Lewis mentioned that they knew that the tooth was the first dinosaur fossil known from the Yellowstone National Park, and Love (1973) placed USNM PAL 768805 within the Deinodontidae, while Harris et al. (1996) instead listed the tooth as belonging to the Tyrannosauridae.

The specimen was renamed to USMN PAL 768805 in 2021 when it was moved to the Paleobiology Collections of the Smithsonian’s National Museum of Natural History. The tooth was assigned to cf. Tyrannosaurus sp. by Hodnett et al. (2023), who also suggested that it was the shed tooth of a juvenile.

== Paleofauna ==
- ? Leptoceratops sp. (neoceratopsia indet)
- Saurexallopus loevei
- Prodesmodon sp.
- Ceratopsidae ident.
- Iguanodontidae ident.
- ? Nodosauridae
- Tyrannosauridae ident. (identified as Deinodontidae)
- cf. Tyrannosaurus sp.
- Ornithischia ident.
- Amia sp.
- Crocodylidae ident.

== See also ==
- List of dinosaur-bearing rock formations
  - List of stratigraphic units with few dinosaur genera
