= Ophryotrocha scutellus =

Scientific classification
- Kingdom: Animalia
- Phylum: Annelida
- Clade: Pleistoannelida
- Subclass: Errantia
- Order: Eunicida
- Family: Dorvilleidae
- Genus: Ophryotrocha
- Species: O. scutellus

Binomial name
- Ophryotrocha scutellus Wiklund et al., 2009

Species of annelid

Ophryotrocha scutellus, is a species of polychaete worm. Live observation of this species in aquarium experiments indicate a bacterial diet. O. scutellus is named after the Latin scutella for “saucer”, due to its flattened disc-like head. Ophryotrocha scutellus has a dorsoventrally rounded and flattened prostomium, similar to O. platykephale, from which this species differs in jaw morphology, the form of its parapodia and the absence of branchiae.

== Description ==
Its body shape is elongated, with a uniform width for the majority of its length. It is transparent in colour, white eggs being visible in females. It lacks eyes; it possesses long, cirriform paired antennae, with palps being inserted lateroventrally on the prostomium. Its mandibles are rod-like, and lack serration. Its maxillae have seven pairs of free denticles. It counts with two peristomial segments without setae. It counts with a cirriform acicular lobe, its supraacicular chaetae being simple, while the subacicular chaetae are compound, and exhibit serrated blades. Its pygidium has a terminal anus, with two pygidial cirri that measure as long as its antennae and shows a short appendage ventrally.

== Distribution ==
It was first found in a minke whale carcass at a depth of 125 metres (410 ft) in the Koster area in Sweden, and from sediment at 104 metres (341 ft) beneath a fish farm in Hardangerfjord in Norway.
