= Pierre André Latreille =

French zoologist (1762–1833)

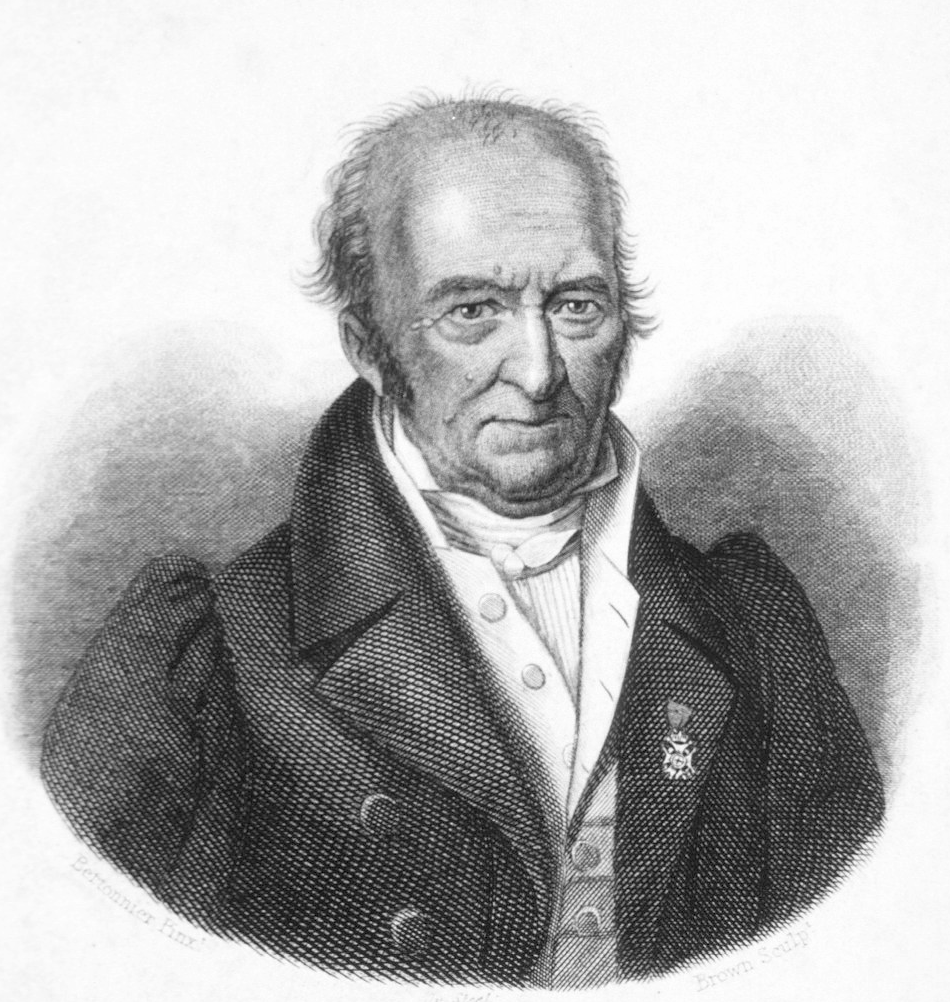
- Born: 29 November 1762; Brive-la-Gaillarde, Kingdom of France
- Died: 6 February 1833 (aged 70); Paris, Kingdom of France
- Education: University of Paris
- Scientific career
- Fields: Entomology, arachnology, carcinology
- Workplaces: Muséum National d'Histoire Naturelle
- Author abbrev. (zoology): Latreille

Signature
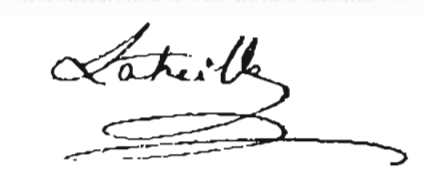

Pierre André Latreille (French pronunciation: [pjɛʁ ɑ̃dʁe latʁɛj]; 29 November 1762 – 6 February 1833) was a French zoologist, specialising in arthropods. Having trained as a Roman Catholic priest before the French Revolution, Latreille was imprisoned, and only regained his freedom after recognising a rare beetle species he found in the prison, Necrobia ruficollis.

He published his first important work, Précis des caractères génériques des insectes, in 1796, and was eventually employed by the Muséum National d'Histoire Naturelle. His foresighted work on arthropod systematics and taxonomy gained him respect and accolades, including being asked to write the volume on insects for Georges Cuvier's monumental work, Le Règne Animal, the only part not by Cuvier himself.

Latreille was considered the foremost entomologist of his time, and was described by one of his pupils as "the prince of entomologists".

== Biography ==
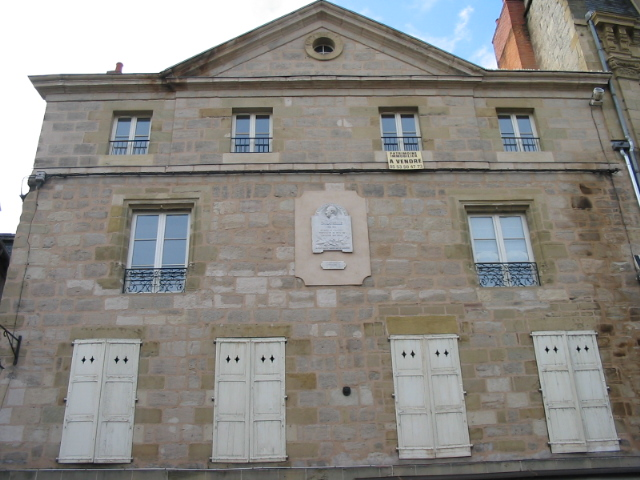
Latreille's birthplace in Brive-la-Gaillarde

=== Early life ===
Pierre André Latreille was born on 29 November 1762 in the town of Brive, then in the province of Limousin, as the illegitimate child of Jean Joseph Sahuguet d'Amarzit, général baron d'Espagnac, who never recognised him, and an unknown mother, who abandoned him at birth; the surname "Latreille" was formally granted to him in 1813, and derives from a nickname of unclear provenance. Latreille, effectively orphaned from his earliest age, had influential protectors – first a physician, then a merchant from Brive, and later a baron (after the baron's death), who brought him to Paris in 1778.

He studied initially in Brive and in Paris at the Collège du Cardinal-Lemoine attached to the University of Paris to become a priest. He entered the Grand Séminaire of Limoges in 1780, and left as a deacon in 1786. Despite being qualified to preach, Latreille later wrote that he had never carried out his functions as a minister, although for a few years he signed the letters he wrote "l'Abbé Latreille" ("the Reverend Latreille") or "Latreille, Prêtre" ("Latreille, Priest").

Even during his studies, Latreille had taken on an interest in natural history, visiting the Jardin du Roi planted by Georges-Louis Leclerc, Comte de Buffon, and catching insects around Paris. He received lessons on botany from René Just Haüy, which brought him in contact with Jean-Baptiste Lamarck.

=== Necrobia ruficollis ===
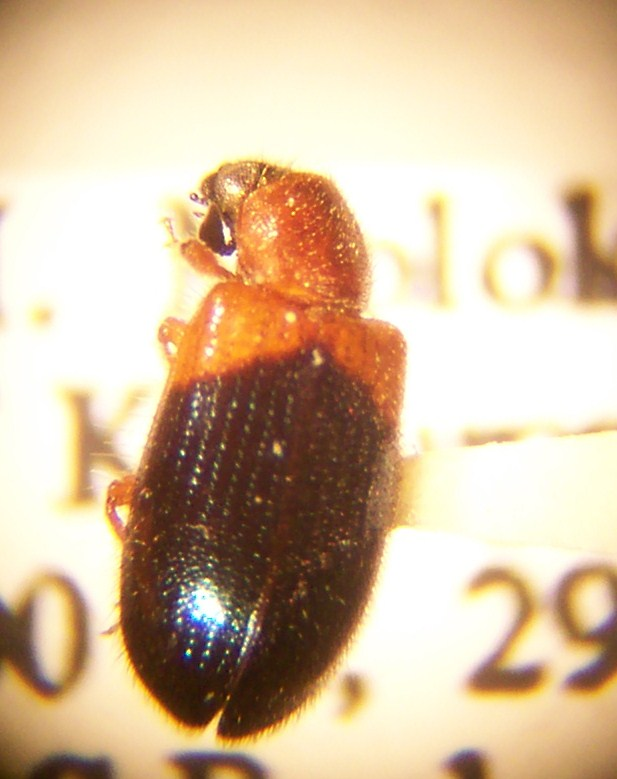
Discovering Necrobia ruficollis while in prison saved Latreille's life.

After the fall of the Ancien Régime and the start of the French Revolution, the Civil Constitution of the Clergy was declared in 1790, which required priests to swear an oath of allegiance to the state. Latreille failed to do so and was therefore imprisoned in November 1793 under threat of execution.

When the prison's doctor inspected the prisoners, he was surprised to find Latreille scrutinising a beetle on the dungeon floor. When Latreille explained that it was a rare insect, the physician was impressed, and sent the insect to a 15-year-old local naturalist, Jean Baptiste Bory de Saint-Vincent. Bory de St.-Vincent knew Latreille's work, and managed to obtain the release of Latreille and one of his cell-mates. Latreille and Bory de Saint-Vincent remained life-long friends. The beetle had been described by Johan Christian Fabricius in 1775, but recognising it had saved Latreille from likely demise, as all the other inmates were dead within one month.

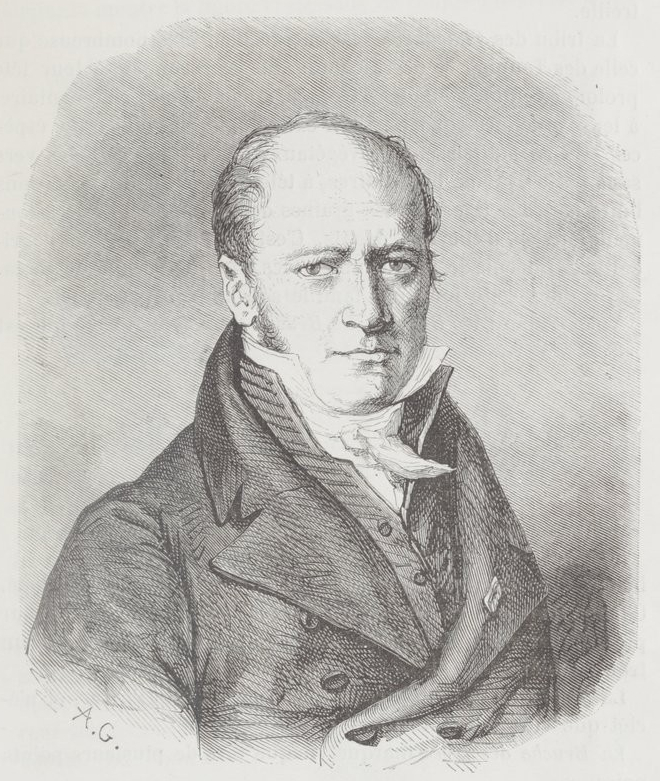
Portrait of Latreille by Louis Figuier, 1875

Thereafter, Latreille lived as a teacher and corresponded with various entomologists, including Fabricius. In 1796, and with Fabricius' encouragement, Latreille published his Précis des caractères génériques des insectes at his own expense. He was briefly placed under house arrest in 1797 and his books were confiscated, but the influence of Georges Cuvier, Bernard Germain de Lacépède and Jean-Baptiste Lamarck (who all held chairs of zoology at the recently instituted Muséum national d'Histoire naturelle) succeeded in freeing Latreille. In 1798, Latreille was appointed to the Muséum, where he worked alongside Lamarck, curating the arthropod collections, and published a number of zoological works.

=== First Empire ===
Following the death of the entomologist Guillaume-Antoine Olivier in 1814, Latreille succeeded him as titular member of the Académie des sciences de l'Institut de France. In the following few years, Latreille was especially productive, producing important papers for the Mémoires du Muséum, all of the volume on arthropods for Georges Cuvier's Le Règne Animal ("The Animal Kingdom", 1817), and hundreds of entries in the Nouveau Dictionnaire d'Histoire Naturelle on entomological subjects. In 1819, Latreille was elected as a member of the American Philosophical Society in Philadelphia. As Lamarck became blind, Latreille took on an increasing proportion of his teaching and research work. In 1821, Latreille was made a knight of the Légion d'honneur. In 1829 he succeeded Lamarck as professor of entomology.

=== Later years ===
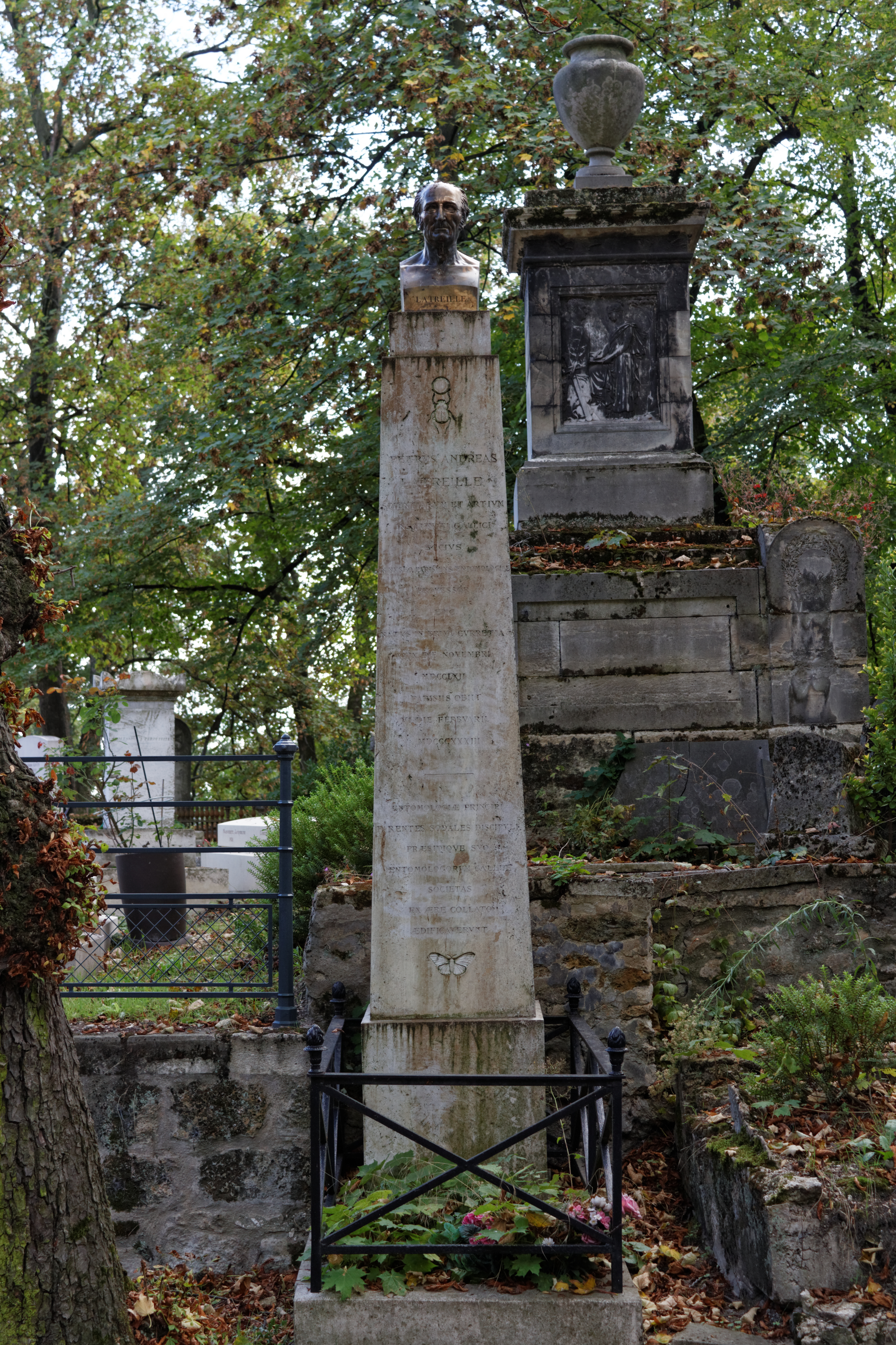
Monument to Latreille over his grave at Père Lachaise Cemetery (39th division)

From 1824, Latreille's health deteriorated. He handed his lectures over to Jean Victoire Audouin and took on several assistants for his research work, including Amédée Louis Michel Lepeletier, Jean Guillaume Audinet-Serville and Félix Édouard Guérin-Méneville. He was instrumental in the founding of the Société entomologique de France, and served as its honorary president.

Latreille's wife became ill in 1830 and died in May that year; the date of Latreille's marriage is unclear, and his request to be released from his vow of celibacy was never acknowledged. He resigned his position at the museum on 10 April 1832, in order to move to the country and thereby avoid the cholera epidemic. He returned to Paris in November, and died of bladder disease on 6 February 1833. He had no children but was survived by a niece whom he had adopted.

=== Commemoration ===
The Société entomologique raised the money to pay for a monument to Latreille. This was erected over Latreille's grave at Père Lachaise Cemetery (39th division), and comprised a 9-foot (2.7 m) obelisk with various inscriptions, including one to the beetle which had saved Latreille's life: "Necrobia ruficollis Latreillii salvator" ("Necrobia ruficollis, Latreille's saviour").

As testimony to the high esteem in which Latreille was held, many books were dedicated to him, and up to 163 species were named in his honour between 1798 and 1850. Taxa commemorating Latreille include:

A 3D model based on a micro-CT scan of the polychaete worm Lumbrineris latreilli, which is named after Latreille.

- Lumbrineris latreilli Audouin & H. Milne-Edwards, 1833
- Cecrops latreillii Leach, 1816
- Apseudes latreillii (H. Milne-Edwards, 1828)
- Orbinia latreillii (Audouin & H. Milne-Edwards, 1833)
- Latreillia Roux, 1830
- Cilicaea latreillei Leach, 1818
- Bittium latreillii (Payraudeau, 1826)
- Macrophthalmus latreillei (Desmarest, 1822)
- Eurypodius latreillei Guérin, 1828
- Sphex latreillei Lepeletier de Saint Fargeau, 1831

== Work ==
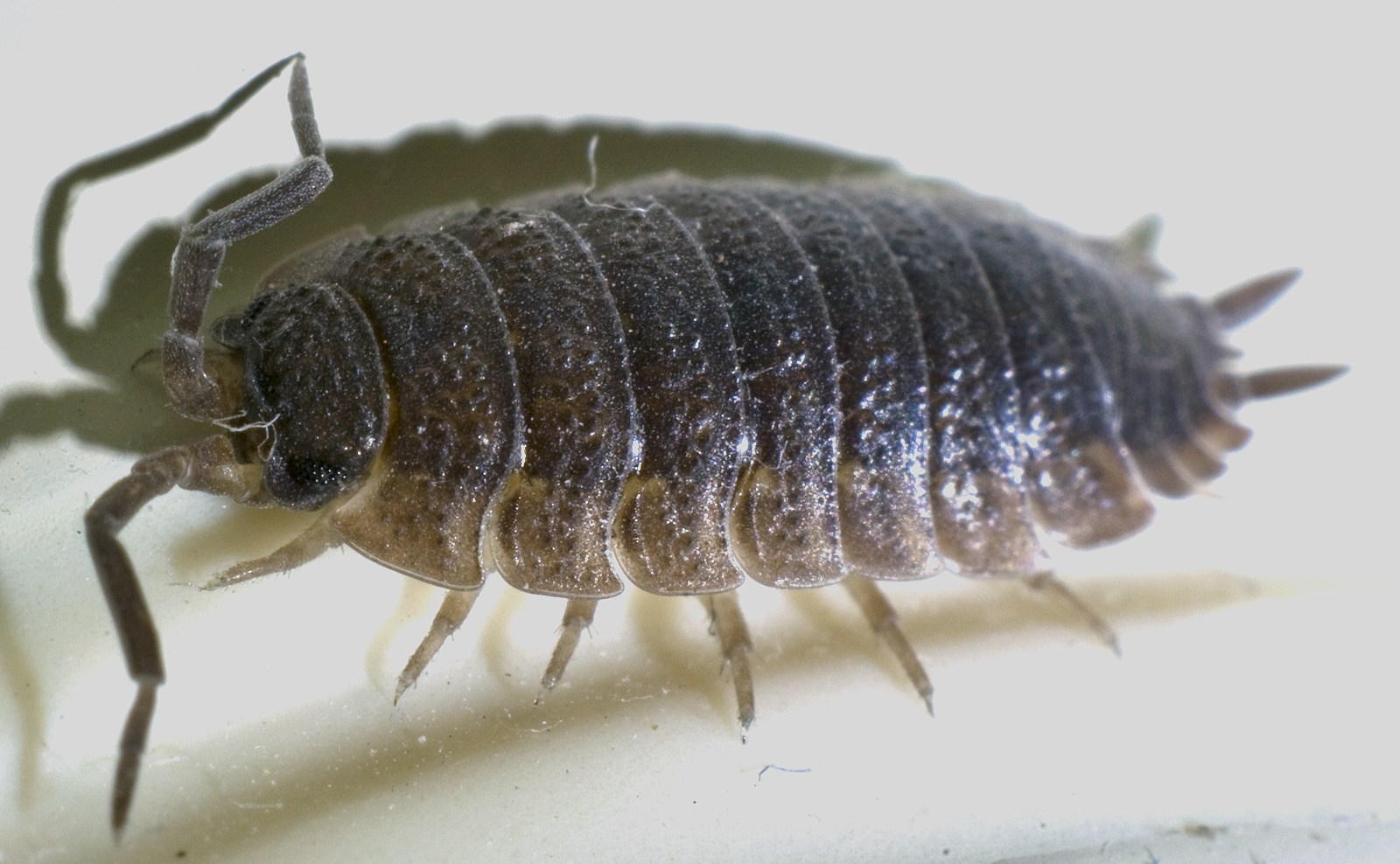
Latreille named the rough woodlouse Porcellio scaber in 1804, and also established the genus Porcellio (1804), the sub-order Oniscidea (1802), the order Isopoda (1817) and the class Malacostraca (1802).

Latreille produced a significant body of scientific work, extending across several fields. He was described by Johan Christian Fabricius as entomologorum nostri aevi princeps ("the foremost entomologist of our time"), and by Jean Victoire Audouin as Entomologiae Princeps ("the prince of entomology").

=== Taxonomy and systematics ===
Latreille was significant as the first person to attempt a natural classification of the arthropods. His "eclectic method" of systematics incorporated evidence from all available characters without assuming a pre-defined goal; Latreille repeatedly dismissed anthropocentrism and teleology.

As well as many species and countless genera, the names of many higher taxa are also attributable to Latreille, including Thysanura, Siphonaptera, Ostracoda, Stomatopoda, Xiphosura, and Myriapoda.

=== Typification ===
Although Latreille named many species, his primary interest was in describing genera. He introduced the concept of the "type species", a species to which the name of a genus is firmly attached. Similarly, he favoured the method of naming families after one of the constituent genera, rather than some defining feature of the group, implicitly designating a type genus for the family.
