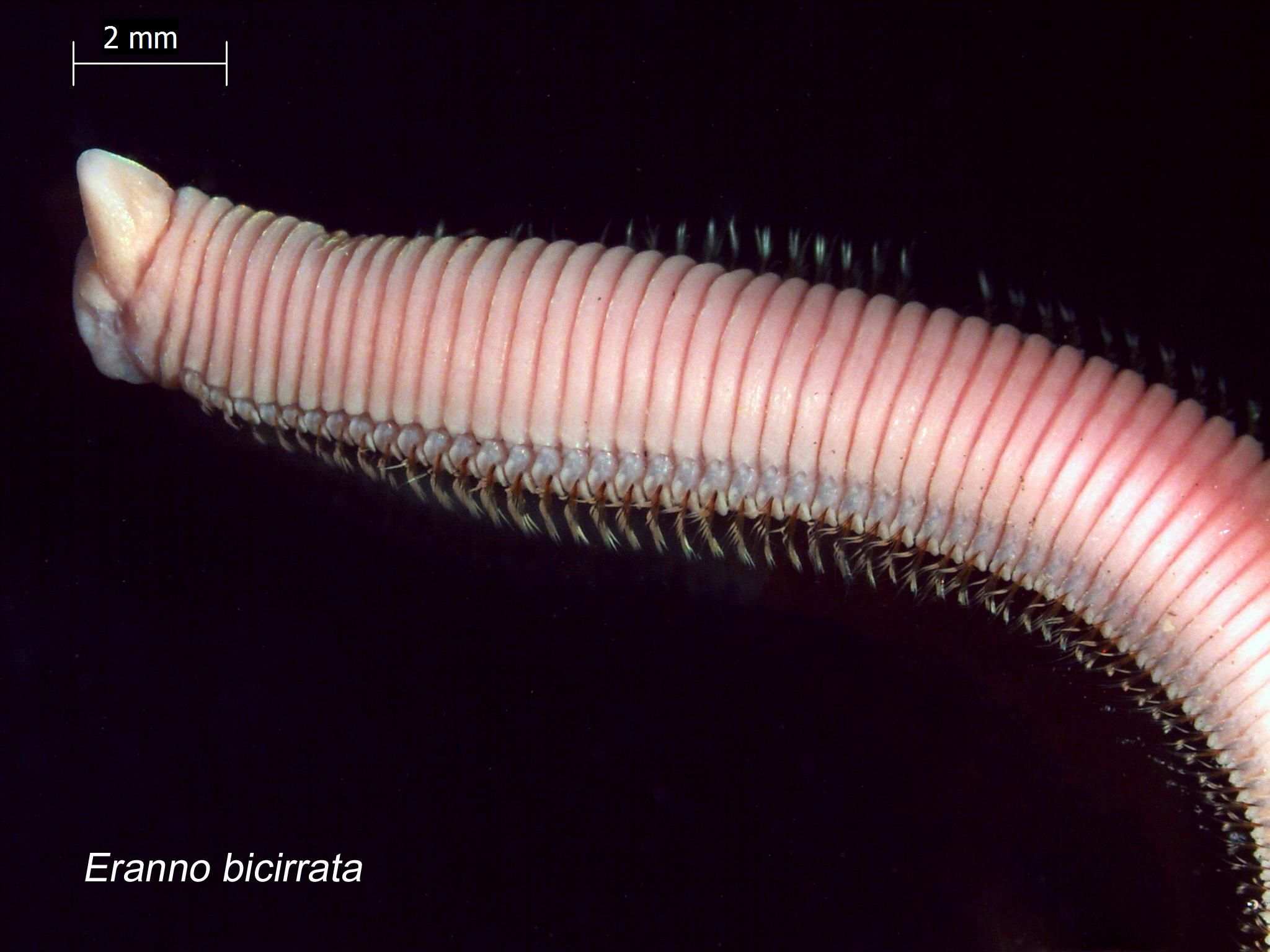
- Eranno bicirrata

Scientific classification
- Kingdom: Animalia
- Phylum: Annelida
- Clade: Pleistoannelida
- Subclass: Errantia
- Order: Eunicida
- Family: Lumbrineridae

Synonyms
- Lumbrinereidae; Lumbrineriidae; Lysaretidae

= Lumbrineridae =

Family of annelids

Iris worms (Lumbrineridae) are a family of polychaetes in the order Eunicida. Lumbrineridae live in oceans worldwide. They are mostly bottom-dwelling species but exist in habitats ranging from the deep sea to shallows.

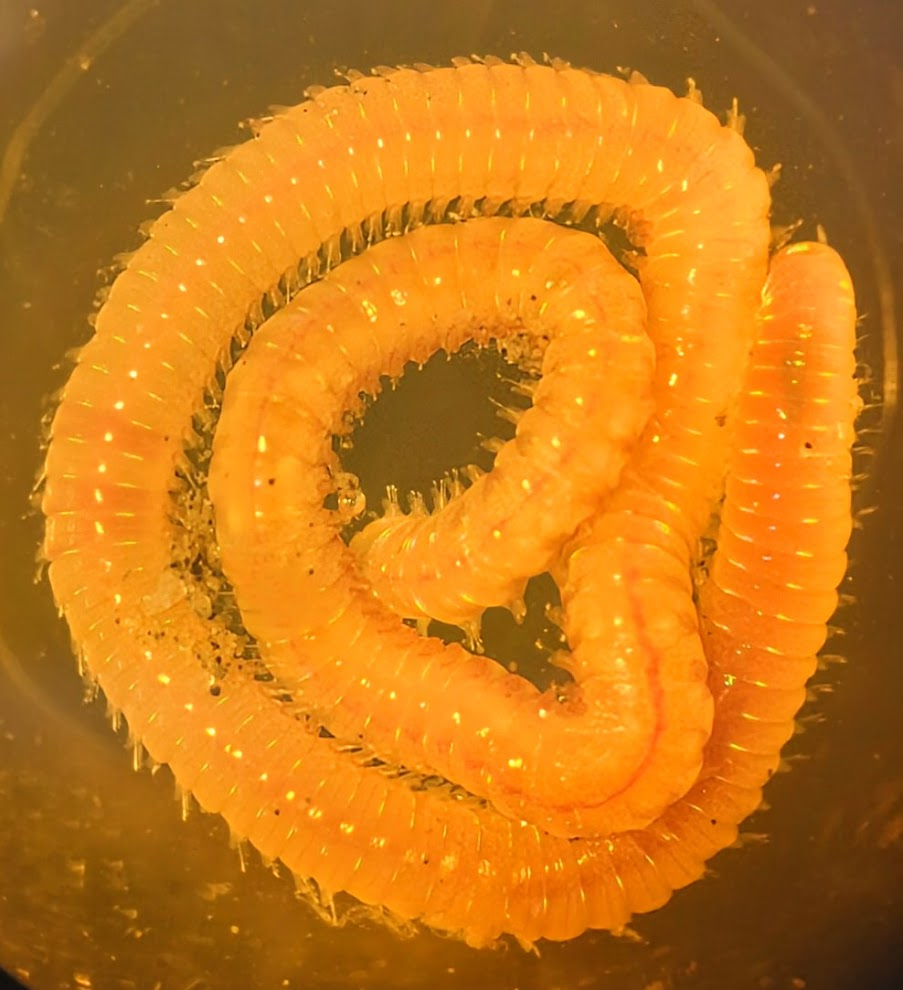
An iris worm photographed at University of Washingtons Friday Harbor Labs

== Distribution and habitat ==
Iris worms (Lumbrineridae) are distributed worldwide and are primarily found in the soft sediment of shallow intertidal waters, although they are sometimes found to live on rocky bottoms and in algal holdfasts. Lumbrineris flabellicola is considered unusual compared to other members of Lumbrineridae due to the way that its appearance grooves and membranous tubes in various ahermatypic corals.

The population biology of Lumbrineridae is unknown.

== Diet ==
A few observations suggest that iris worm diets include carnivory on various invertebrates and questionable herbivory. Selective deposit feeding was described for Ninoe nigripes and Lumbrineris cf. latreilli.

== Genera ==
Genera:

- Abyssoninoe Orensanz, 1990
- Aotearia Benham, 1927
- Augeneria Monro, 1930
- Cenogenus Chamberlin, 1919
- Enonella Stimpson, 1853
- Eranno Kinberg, 1865
- Gallardoneris Carrera-Parra, 2006
- Gesaneris Carrera-Parra, 2006
- Helmutneris Carrera-Parra, 2006
- Hilbigneris Carrera-Parra, 2006
- Kuwaita Mohammad, 1973
- Loboneris Carrera-Parra, 2006
- Lumbricalus Frame, 1992
- Lumbriconereis Grube, 1840
- Lumbrinerides Orensanz, 1973
- Lumbrineriopsis Orensanz, 1973
- Lumbrineris Blainville, 1828
- Lysarete Kinberg, 1865
- Ninoe Kinberg, 1865
- Ophiuricola Ludwig, 1905
- Paraninoe Levenstein, 1977
- Phiops Schram, 1979
- Phoeniciarabella Bracchi & Alessandrello, 2005
- Scoletoma Blainville, 1828
- Sergioneris Carrera-Parra, 2006
- Teruzzia Bracchi & Alessandrello, 2005
- Unciniseta Bidenkap, 1907
