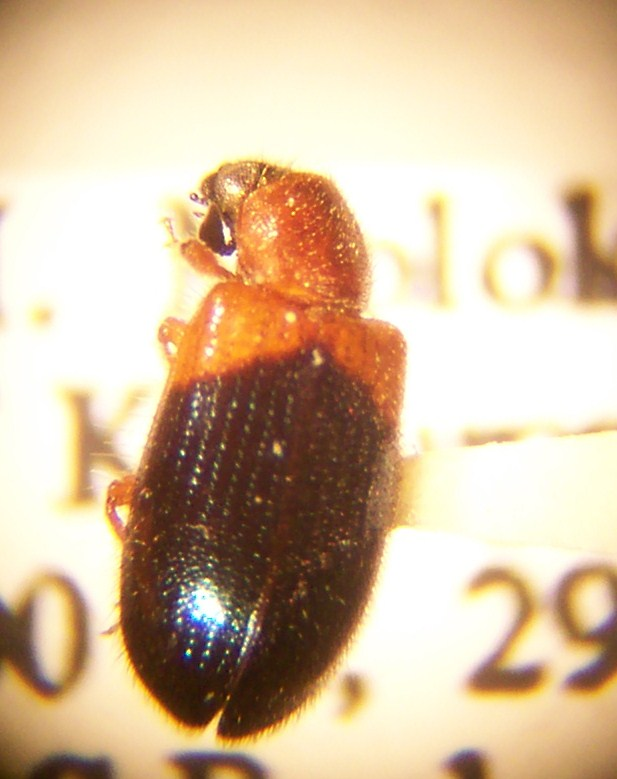

Scientific classification
- Kingdom: Animalia
- Phylum: Arthropoda
- Class: Insecta
- Order: Coleoptera
- Suborder: Polyphaga
- Infraorder: Cucujiformia
- Family: Cleridae
- Genus: Necrobia
- Species: N. ruficollis

Binomial name
- Necrobia ruficollis (Fabricius, 1775)

= Necrobia ruficollis =

Species of beetle

Necrobia ruficollis, the ham beetle, red-shouldered ham beetle, or red-necked bacon beetle, is a mostly carnivorous beetle in the family Cleridae with a cosmopolitan distribution.

== Description ==
Necrobia ruficollis is 4.0–6.5 mm (0.16–0.26 in) long, and is mostly a metallic black or dark blue colour. Its thorax and legs and the bases of the elytra are reddish brown.

== Ecology ==
It feeds on dead animals, including dried and smoked meats and animal skins, as well as on cheese. It is frequently found in cadavers in the later stages of decomposition, and is thus useful in forensic entomology.

== Latreille ==
French zoologist Pierre André Latreille was imprisoned in 1793 in Bordeaux and faced deportation to the penal colony of Cayenne, after failing to swear allegiance to the state following the Civil Constitution of the Clergy. When the prison's doctor inspected the prisoners, he was surprised to find Latreille scrutinising a beetle on the dungeon floor. When Latreille explained that it was a rare insect, having identified it as Necrobia ruficollis, the physician was impressed and sent the insect to a 15-year-old local naturalist, Jean Baptiste Bory de Saint-Vincent. Bory de St.-Vincent knew Latreille's work, and managed to obtain the release of Latreille and one of his cellmates. All the other inmates were dead within one month.
