= Whale fall =

Whale carcass falling to the ocean floor

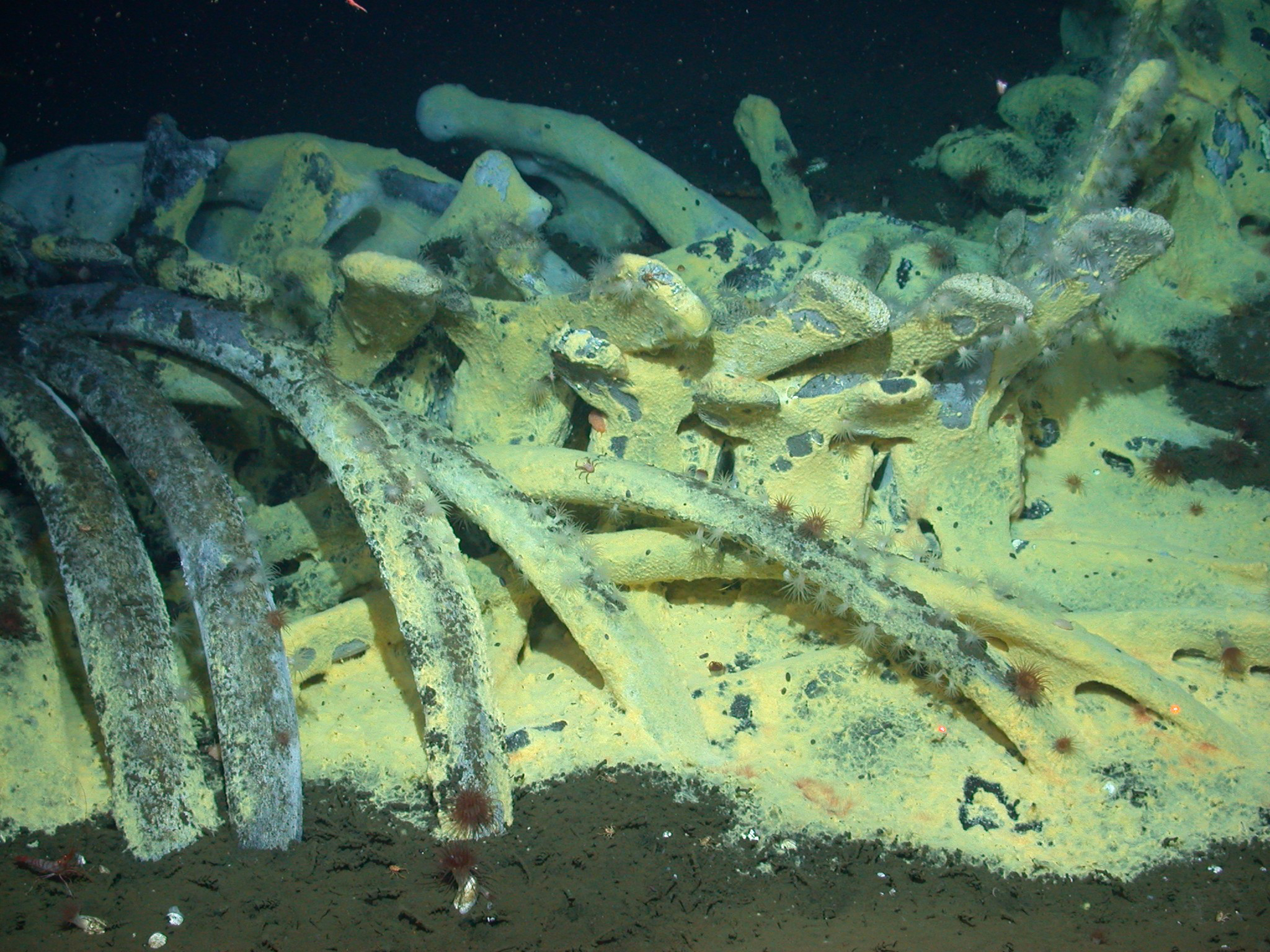
A chemoautotrophic whale fall community in the Santa Cruz basin off southern California at a depth of 1,674 m (5,492 ft), including bacteria mats, vesicomyid clams in the sediments, galatheid crabs, polynoids, and a variety of other invertebrates.

A whale fall occurs when the carcass of a whale has fallen onto the ocean floor, typically at a depth greater than 1,000 m (3,300 ft), putting them in the bathyal or abyssal zones. On the sea floor, these carcasses can create complex localized ecosystems that supply sustenance to deep-sea organisms for decades. In some circumstances, particularly in cases with lower water temperatures, they can be found at much shallower depths, with at least one natural instance recorded at 150 m (500 ft) and multiple experimental instances in the range of 30–382 m (100–1,300 ft). Whale falls were first observed in the late 1970s with the development of deep-sea robotic exploration. Since then, several natural and experimental whale falls have been monitored through the use of observations from submersibles and remotely operated underwater vehicles (ROVs) in order to understand patterns of ecological succession on the deep seafloor.

Deep sea whale falls are thought to be hotspots of adaptive radiation for specialized fauna. Organisms that have been observed at deep-sea whale fall sites include chordates, arthropods, cnidarians, echinoderms, mollusks, nematodes, and annelids. New species have been discovered, including some potentially specializing in whale falls. It has been postulated that whale falls generate biodiversity by providing evolutionary stepping stones for multiple lineages to move and adapt to new, environmentally challenging habitats. Researchers estimate that 690,000 carcasses/skeletons of the nine largest whale species are in one of the four stages of succession at any one time. This estimate implies an average spacing of 12 km (7.5 mi) and as little as 5 km (3.1 mi) along migration routes. They hypothesize that this distance is short enough to allow larvae to disperse/migrate from one to another.

Whale falls are able to occur in the deep open ocean due to cold temperatures and high hydrostatic pressures. In the coastal ocean, a higher incidence of predators as well as warmer waters hasten the decomposition of whale carcasses. Carcasses may also float due to decompositional gases, keeping the carcass at the surface. The bodies of most great whales (which includes sperm whales and many species of baleen whale) are slightly denser than the surrounding seawater, and only become positively buoyant when the lungs are filled with air. When the lungs deflate, the whale carcasses can reach the seafloor quickly and relatively intact due to a lack of significant whale fall scavengers in the water column. Once in the deep-sea, cold temperatures slow decomposition rates, and high hydrostatic pressures increase gas solubility, allowing whale falls to remain intact and sink to even greater depths.

== Contribution to the biological pump ==
The amount of carbon tied up in a typical single whale carcass (about two tonnes of carbon for a typical 40-tonne carcass) is roughly equivalent to the amount of carbon exported to a hectare of abyssal ocean floor in 100–200 years. This amount of organic material reaching the seafloor at one time creates a pulse equivalent to about 2000 years of background carbon flux in the 50 square meters of sediment immediately beneath the whale fall. This helps to sustain the community structure that develops around a whale fall, but it also has potential implications for the biological pump, or the flux of organic material from the surface ocean to depth.

Whales and some other large marine animals feed on and follow large aggregations of zooplankton for sustenance. Based on simple trophic structure, this would mean whales and other large zooplankton feeders can be found at higher abundance around areas of high primary production, potentially making them important exporters of carbon to depth through food falls. Biological pump models indicate that a large amount of carbon uptake by the deep sea is not supplied by particulate organic carbon (POC) alone, and must come from another source. Lateral advection of carbon, especially in coastal areas, contributes to this deficit in the model, but food falls are also another source of organic carbon for the deep ocean. Various percentages of the food fall contribution to the total carbon flux to the deep ocean have been hypothesized, ranging from 0.3% to 4%.

There is growing evidence that the contribution of food falls to the deep ocean carbon flux is larger than originally proposed, especially on the local scale in areas of high primary productivity. Unfortunately, contributions of food falls to the biological pump are hard to measure and rely on a few serendipitous studies on discovered falls as well as planted carcasses with much of the deep sea carbon flux studies relying on sediment traps.

== Discovery ==
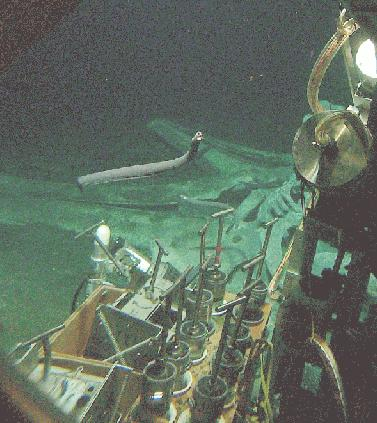
The skeleton of a gray whale lies on the Santa Cruz Basin seafloor as a hagfish swims into view of the US Navy's deep-sea submersible Alvin.

The earliest indication that whale carcasses could host specialized animal communities occurred in 1854 when a new mussel species was extracted from a piece of floating whale blubber. By the 1960s, deep sea trawlers unintentionally recovered other new mollusc species including limpets (named Osteopelta) attached to whale bones.

The first recorded abyssal whale fall was discovered by US Navy bathyscaphe pilots LT Ken Hanson, Master Chief George Ellis and LT Tom Vetter diving in bathyscaphe Trieste II (DSV-1) on 19 February 1977. The skeleton of the carcass, which was completely devoid of organic tissue, remained intact and collapsed flat on the seafloor. The submersible recovered a jawbone and phalanges. The whale was considered to be a gray whale based on the size of the bones and the skeleton, the lack of teeth and its location west of Santa Catalina.

The first whale fall ecosystem, which included a chemoautotrophic assemblage living on the anaerobic breakdown of organic material in whale bones, was discovered by a team of scientists led by University of Hawaiʻi oceanographer Craig Smith in 1987. The DSV Alvin observed the remains using scanning sonar at 1,240 m (4,070 ft) in the Catalina Basin and collected the first photographic images and samples of animals and microbes from this remarkable community.

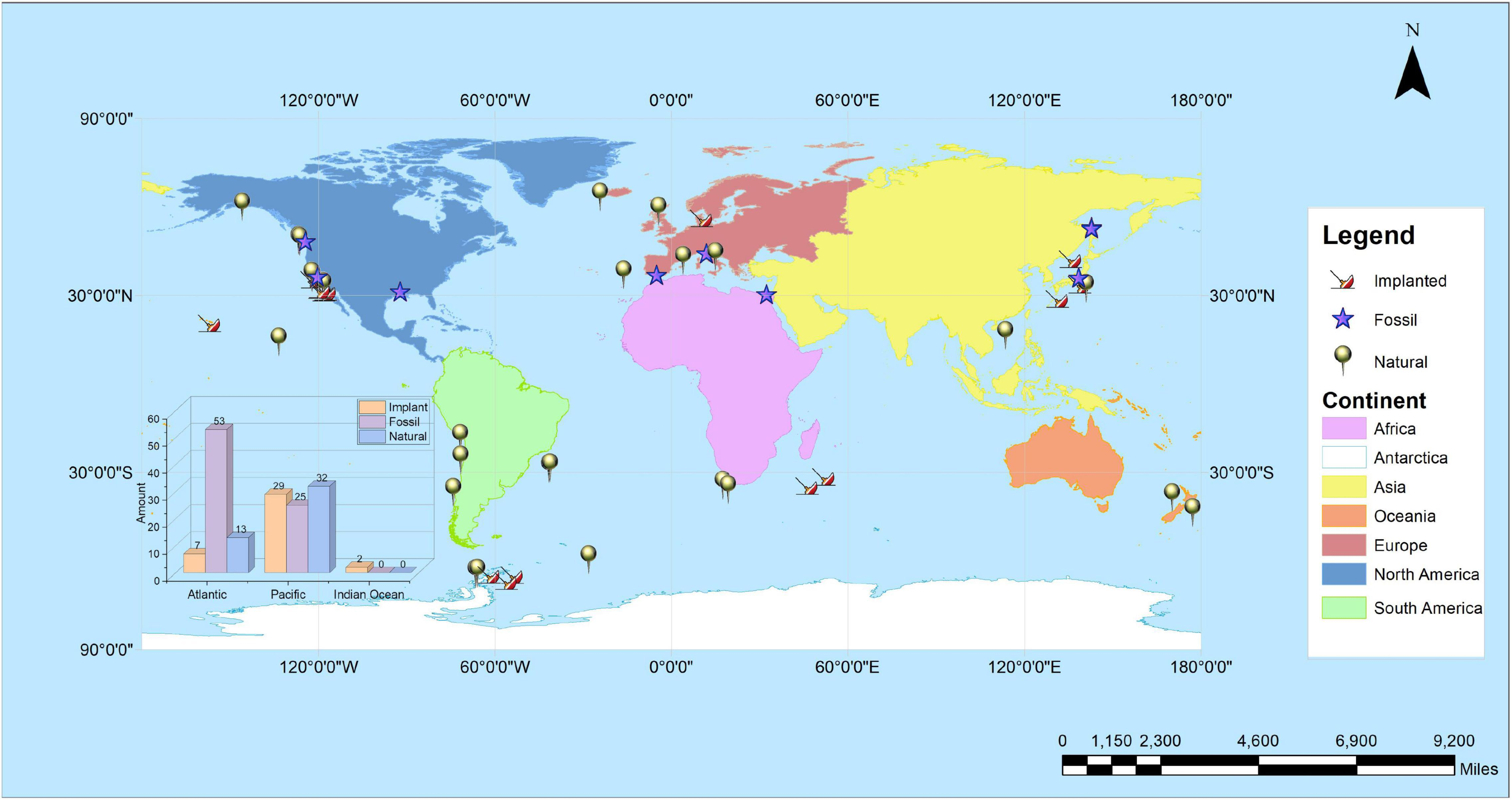
Distribution of currently known whale falls in the world. (May 2022)

Many other whale falls have since been found by more researchers and deep-sea explorers, as well as by naval submarines. The increase in detection is largely due to the use of cutting-edge side-scan sonar which can minutely examine the ocean floor for large aggregations of matter. A 2022 study identified 45 known natural whale falls, 38 implanted ones, and 78 fossil ones, mostly in the Pacific, but a significant number, particularly of fossil ones, in the Atlantic.

A 2023 Scripps survey found at least 7 whale falls in an area of 135 sq mi surveyed off the California coast, with sonar evidence that may indicate up to 60 total in that area.

A June 2026 article in Nature describes the discovery of a "whale necropolis" that includes both modern whale falls and fossil whale remains in the Diamantina fracture zone.

== Ecology ==
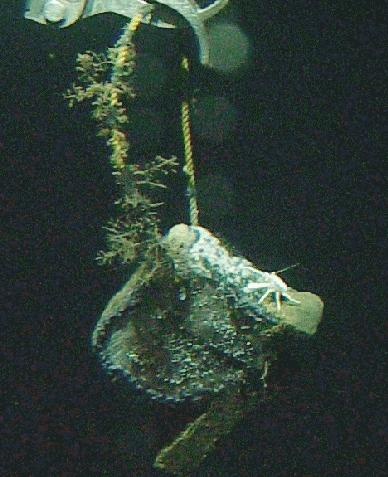
A whale bone being recovered from the Santa Catalina Basin floor five years after experimental emplacement. The bone surface contains patches of white bacterial mats and a squat lobster. Hydroids have sprouted on the loop of yellow line attached to the bone.

Whale falls are distributed heterogeneously throughout space and time, with a concentration along migration routes. There is much faunal overlap in these whale falls across oceans. Mussels and vesicomyid clams belong to groups that harbor chemosynthetic bacteria, which can draw energy from inorganic chemicals, such as sulfur. Before their presence was discovered at whale falls, the only known habitats of these groups were sunken wood and hydrothermal vents. Similarly, lucinid clams were previously only known to inhabit carbon seeps and anoxic seafloor sediments. Osedax, a genus of deep-sea polychaete worms, acts as an ecosystem engineer by excreting acid to erode whale bones and absorbing the nutrients trapped within. This enhances biodiversity in the deep sea by increasing the water diffusion into the matrix of bones and facilitating colonization of the bone matrix by rarer species. Members of Osedax have more dramatic effects in juvenile skeletons, which are not as well-calcified as adult skeletons.

At whale fall sites it is common to see between three and five trophic levels present, with two main nutritional sources constituting the base of the food web. Adult whale carcasses can house up to five trophic levels, whereas juveniles more typically have three.

Recent studies also show a possible trend of "dual niche partitioning", in which scavengers tend to reach peak densities on the carcass during the day and predators are more present during the night, reducing competition between the two trophic groups. There is also a possible trend in tidal patterns and species occurrence, indicating that tides play a role in niche partitioning as well.

Similar ecosystems exist when other large volumes of nutrient-rich material fall to the sea floor. Sunken beds of kelp create kelp falls, and large trees can sink to create wood falls. In more recent years, shipwrecks have also provided bases for deepwater communities. In ecosystems formed following a whale fall event, there are four stages of ecological succession.

=== Biodiversity ===
Many different taxa are known to interact with and inhabit whale falls, including multiple newly discovered species. At the base of these ecosystems is the microbial community. Sulfur-oxidizing, sulfate-reducing, and methanogenic microbes are the most prevalent types found on whale falls. Among the sulfate-reducing bacteria, Desulfobacteraceae and Desulfobulbaceae are the most common, while Methanomicrobiales and Methanosarcinales are the most common among the methanogenic archaea. Though chemosynthetic, and specifically chemolithoautotrophic, microorganisms are significant to the ecology of whale falls, these ecosystems are typically first inhabited by heterotrophic microbes such as actinomycetes, which break down collagen, and sulfate reducers. The presence of such heterotrophic microbes paves the way for the chemosynthetic organisms, which then form bacterial mats that provide for larger organisms, such as certain annelid species.

Chordate scavengers are also early inhabitants of whale falls. Some of these relatively large scavengers that have been recorded include hagfish, sleeper sharks, and various bony fish species such as blob sculpin, Dover sole, and snubnose eelpout. Many crustacean species can also be found on whale falls, including tanner and galatheid crabs. Another common crustacean inhabitant of whale falls is amphipods, which often show up in relatively high concentrations.

Whale falls also house cnidarians, echinoderms, and mollusks. Sea anemones, brittle stars, and sea urchins in particular have been recorded at whale fall sites. Additionally, there are many species of bivalve, including members of Mytilidae and Vesicomyidae, and of marine gastropods, including members of the bone-eating genus Rubyspira. Marine nematodes in the genera Halomonyhystera, Anticoma, and Theristus have also been recorded, though research on them is less extensive than other whale fall taxa.

Of all taxa observed at whale falls, annelids have received the most research focus. Though marine leeches have been observed at whale falls, polychaetas tend to be the focus of much of the annelid research on whale falls. This is in part due to the number of new polychaeta species discovered in these ecosystems. Two common genera are Ophryotrocha, which displays adaptive radiation on whale falls, and the genus Osedax, which are specialists that burrow into bones. Members of Osedax can be found on whale falls across the globe, though different species have been discovered on Atlantic whale falls than on Pacific whale falls.

=== Ecosystem stages ===
There are four stages of decomposition associated with a whale fall. These stages vary in duration and overlap with one other with the size of the carcass, water depth, and other environmental variables, such as tidal flow. Large, intact whale falls appear to pass through the four decomposition stages, while the stages on smaller or partial carcasses may be truncated. Smaller cetaceans, such as porpoises and dolphins, do not undergo the same ecological succession stages due to their small size and lower lipid content. Researchers believe the presence of Osedax worms may also be a contributing factor in the observed successional differences.

==== Stage 1 ====
The initial period begins with "mobile scavengers" such as hagfish and sleeper sharks actively consuming soft tissue from the carcass. Consumption can be at a rate of 40–60 kilograms (88–132 lb) per day. This stage typically lasts months up to 1.5 years.

==== Stage 2 ====
The second stage introduces the "enrichment opportunists". These are animals which colonize the bones and surrounding sediments that have been contaminated with organic matter from the carcass and any other tissue left by the scavengers. This stage can last months up to 4.5 years.

==== Stage 3 ====
In the third stage, sulfophilic bacteria anaerobically break down the lipids embedded in the bones. Instead of oxygen, they reduce dissolved sulfate (SO^{2−}_{4}) and excrete hydrogen sulfide. Due to the toxicity of H_{2}S, only resistant chemosynthetic bacteria survive. The bacterial mats provide nourishment for mussels, clams, limpets and sea snails. As whale bones are rich in lipids, representing 4–6% of its body weight, the final digestion stage can last between 50 and possibly 100 years.

==== Stage 4 ====
Some scientists postulate a fourth stage of ecological succession at whale fall sites, called the "reef stage". A whale fall enters this stage once the organic compounds have been exhausted and only minerals remain in the bones, which provide a hard substrate for suspension and filter feeders.

=== Methanogenesis ===
A process called methanogenesis can also occur around whale falls. Archaea that produce methane can be abundant in anoxic sediment, but are typically not found in co-occurrence with the sulfur reducing bacteria found at whale falls. Whale falls do however support both sulfur reducing bacteria and methane producing archaea, leading to the conclusion that the area is not electron donor limited or there is minimal or no competition for suitable substrate. Concentration gradients of both sulfide and methane can be found around whale falls, with the highest concentration coming within one meter of the carcass, which is several orders of magnitude higher than the surrounding sediment concentrations. Methanogenesis appears to only occur in sediments as opposed to sulfur reduction, which occurs both in sediments and on the bones of the carcass. The addition of sulfur reduction in both sediments and high lipid whale bones is a key factor for why whale falls are able to sustain deep-sea communities for extended periods of time.

== Paleontology ==
Whale fall fossils from the late Eocene and Oligocene (34–23 MYA) in Washington and from the Pliocene in Italy include clams that also inhabited non-chemosynthetic environments. Chemosynthetic-only animals do not appear until the Miocene (23–5 MYA) in California and Japan. This may be because the lipid content of early whale bones was too low. As prehistoric whales evolved to live in pelagic waters and dive deeper, structural changes in their anatomy included increased size, reduced bone density and higher lipid content. It is this increased lipid content that led to the establishment of chemosynthetic communities in the deep sea.

The discovery of the limpet Osteopelta in an Eocene New Zealand turtle bone indicates that these animals evolved before whales, including possibly inhabiting Mesozoic (251–66 MYA) reptiles. They may have survived in seeps, wood-falls and vents while waiting out the 20 million year gap between the reptiles' extinction and whales' emergence. Another possibility is that these fossils represent a prior, dead-end evolutionary path, and that today's whale fall animals evolved independently.

== Anthropogenic effects ==
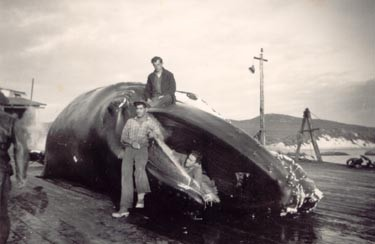
Whalers stand with a whale that they have recently caught.

It has been suggested that the whaling industry has had an effect on the biological pump through the elimination of many large whales, reducing the amount of whale falls. The effects of this on benthic whale fall community assemblages is not well understood. However, it is suggested that the removal of large whales might have reduced the total biomass of the deep sea by more than 30%. Whales stored massive amounts of carbon that were exported to the deep sea during whale fall events. Whaling has thus also reduced the ability of the deep sea to sequester carbon. Carbon can be sequestered for hundreds to thousands of years in the deep sea, supporting benthic communities. It is estimated that, in terms of carbon sequestration, each whale is equivalent to thousands of trees.

== Contrast with other large food-falls ==
There have also been studies based on the carcasses of other, non-mammalian marine vertebrates that have fallen to the deep sea. In particular, the chance discovery of a whale shark carcass and three mobulid ray carcasses led to observations on the communities that form surrounding large elasmobranch falls as opposed to whale falls. Whale sharks inhabit waters of roughly 1,000 meters depth regularly, which suggests it could be a regular form of food fall in areas where it is abundant. Many eelpouts (Zoarcidae) were found surrounding the whale shark with some evidence of direct feeding as boreholes were observed on the carcass. Another theory suggests that the eelpouts were waiting for their main prey, amphipods and other small benthic animals. The three rays found were at different stages of decomposition, leading to varying assemblages found surrounding the individuals. A higher abundance of scavengers was found surrounding the more intact individuals, including scavengers typical of whale falls like hagfish. Around the least intact individual a bacterial mat was observed in the zone of enrichment, but no clams or mussels typical of whale falls were seen.

Overall, the four carcasses observed showed no evidence of progression past the scavenger stage. The size limitations, as well as physiological differences between large elasmobranchs and whales more than likely causes the changes observed in the communities surrounding their respective carcasses. Osedax worms have the ability to extract collagen from bones as well as lipids, enabling them to sustain themselves on bones other than the lipid-rich remains of whales. Although no Osedax were found on the non-mammalian remains in this study, their absence may have been due to the timing of observation, and the Osedax had not yet colonized the carcasses. Various studies on smaller cetaceans and other marine vertebrate food falls come to similar conclusions that these falls bring a large amount of new organic material to depth, but support mostly a scavenger community, as opposed to the diverse assemblage seen at whale falls. This conclusion can be drawn based on the knowledge that large whales have much higher lipid content in their bulk composition and bone marrow, which supports the diverse communities present in succession at whale falls.

Researchers have compared sauropod carcasses to modern whale fall events. The largest carcasses would have been energy rich reservoirs, and it has been argued that they may have been the primary resources of many terrestrial carnivorous dinosaurs, which were argued to have been obligate scavengers. A single dead sauropod would have had enough calories to sustain multiple big theropods for weeks or months, and since they were terrestrial, sauropod carcasses didn't float over long distances or sink into the depths so they were more available to local carnivores than modern whale falls.

== See also ==
- Cetacean stranding
- Deep-sea community
- Marine snow
- Detritivore
- Jelly-falls
- Whaling
- Osedax
- Carbon sequestration
- Deep-sea wood
