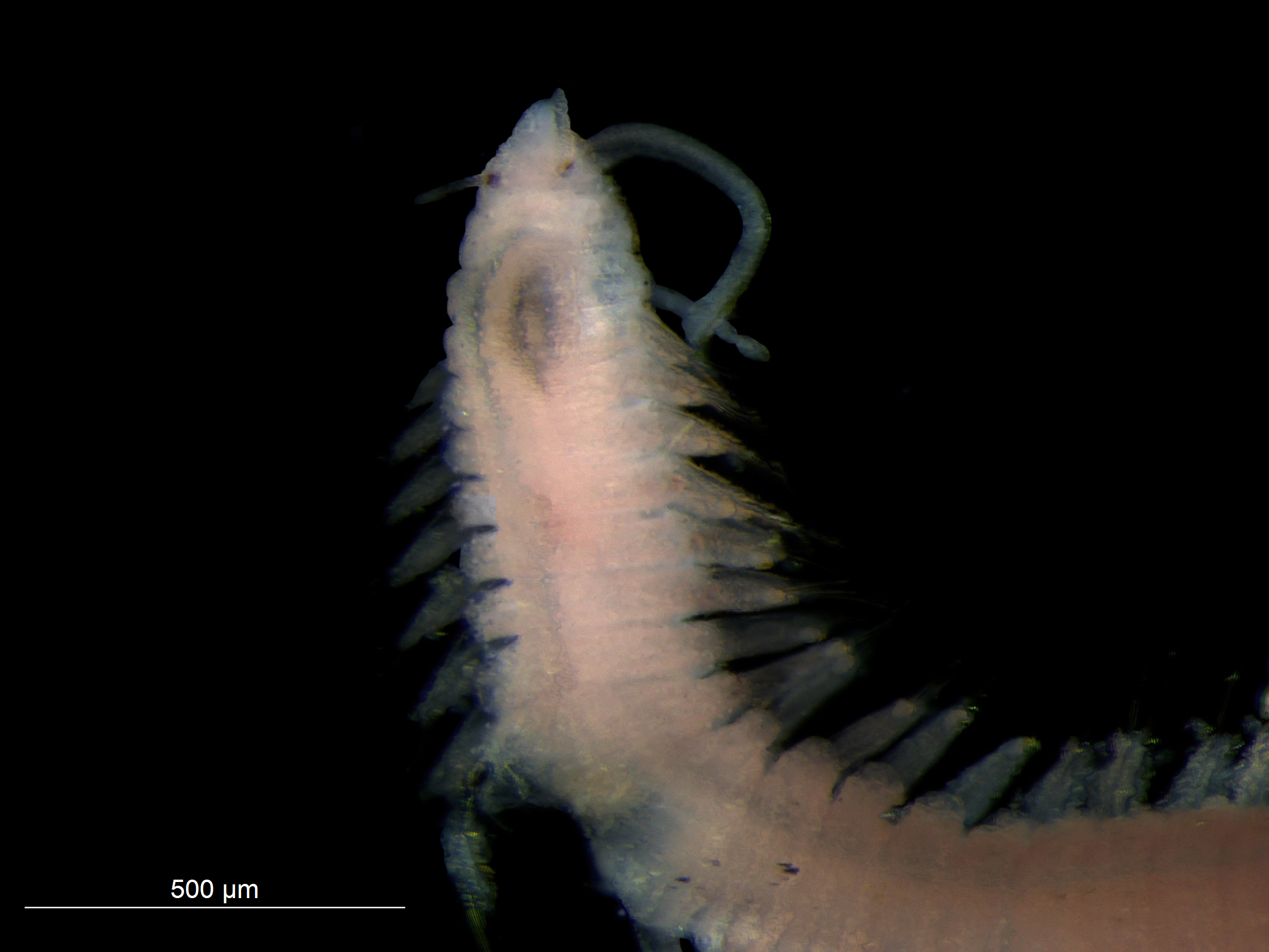
- Protodorvillea kefersteini

Scientific classification
- Kingdom: Animalia
- Phylum: Annelida
- Clade: Pleistoannelida
- Subclass: Errantia
- Order: Eunicida
- Family: Dorvilleidae; Chamberlin, 1919

Synonyms
- Iphitimidae; Pseudophyllodocidae; Staurocephalidae

= Dorvilleidae =

Family of annelids

Dorvilleidae is a family of polychaetes belonging to the order Eunicida. The family Dorvilleidae comprises 32 genera and around 200 species. It includes the majority of the smaller forms of the eunicemorph polychaetes. The family name has been in common use since Chamberlin (1919).

== Genera ==
Genera:

- Anchidorvillea Hilbig & Blake, 1991
- Apodotrocha Westheide & Riser, 1983
- Apophryotrocha Jumars, 1974
- Arenotrocha Westheide & von Nordheim, 1985
- Coralliotrocha Westheide & von Nordheim, 1985
- Diaphorosoma Wolf, 1986
- Dorvillea Parfitt, 1866
- Eliberidens Wolf, 1986
- Exallopus Jumars, 1974
- Gymnodorvillea Wainwright & Perkins, 1982
- Ikosipodoides Westheide, 2000
- Ikosipodus Westheide, 1982
- Iphitime Marenzeller, 1902
- Marycarmenia Nunez, 1998
- Meiodorvillea Jumars, 1974
- Microdorvillea Westheide & von Nordheim, 1985
- Neotenotrocha Eibye-Jacobsen & Kristensen, 1994
- Ophryotrocha Claparède & Mecznikow, 1869
- Ophrytrocha
- Ougia Wolf, 1986
- Parapodrilus Westheide, 1965
- Parophryotrocha Hartmann-Schröder, 1971
- Parougia Wolf, 1986
- Petiboneia
- Petrocha von Nordheim, 1987
- Pettiboneia Campoy & St.Martin, 1980
- Pettiboneia Orensanz, 1973
- Pinniphitime Orensanz, 1990
- Protodorvillea Pettibone, 1961
- Pseudophryotrocha Hilbig & Blake, 1991
- Pseuophryotrocha
- Pusillotrocha Westheide & von Nordheim, 1985
- Schistomeringos Jumars, 1974
- Staurocephalus Barrande, 1846
- Staurocephalus Grube, 1855
- Stauronereis Verrill, 1900
- Telonereis Verrill, 1900
- Veneriserva Rossi, 1984
- Westheideia Wolf, 1986
