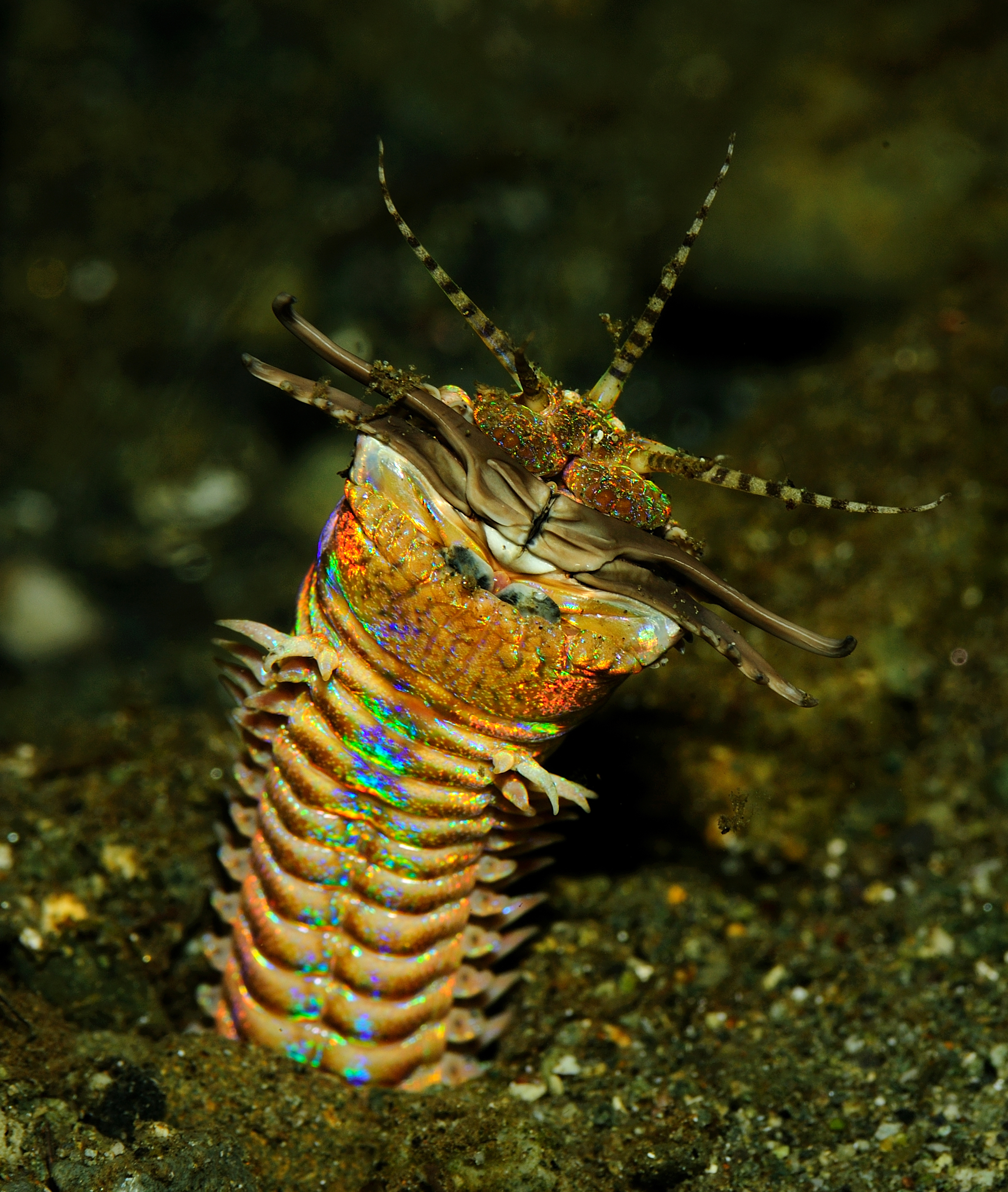
- Eunice aphroditois

Scientific classification
- Kingdom: Animalia
- Phylum: Annelida
- Clade: Pleistoannelida
- Subclass: Errantia
- Order: Eunicida

= Eunicida =

Eunicida Temporal range: Ordovician–recent

Order of annelid worms

Eunicida is an order of polychaete worms.

== Characteristics ==
Members of this order have an elongated, segmented body and a distinct head, normally with a separate peristomium and prostomium. Many, but not all, live in tubes which vary from a mucous sheath to a tough, horny casing. The palps vary from globular to cylindrical and there are from 0 to 7 antennae, usually smooth but occasionally jointed. There is a muscular pharynx with a dorsal pair of mandibles and a set of ventral, toothed, maxillary plates. Some species have tentacular cirri and all have unbranched parapodia. In some species, dorsal cirri, branchiae, ventral cirri and chaetae occur, but not in others.

== Fossil record ==
The Devonian Websteroprion is the largest known fossil eunicidan annelid, with estimated length 1–2 m (3 ft 3 in – 6 ft 7 in). It also had the biggest scolecodonts of any prehistoric polychaete, up to 13.2 mm (0.52 in) in length and possibly larger.

== Families ==
The World Register of Marine Species (WoRMS) includes the following families in the order:

- Dorvilleidae
- Eunicidae
- Hartmaniellidae
- Ichthyotomidae
- Lumbrineridae
- Oenonidae
- Onuphidae
