= Antipathipolyeunoa =

Scientific classification
- Kingdom: Animalia
- Phylum: Annelida
- Clade: Pleistoannelida
- Subclass: Errantia
- Order: Phyllodocida
- Family: Polynoidae
- Genus: Antipathipolyeunoa; Pettibone, 1991
- Species: A. nuttingi

Binomial name
- Antipathipolyeunoa nuttingi Pettibone, 1991

Genus of annelid worms

Antipathipolyeunoa is a genus of marine annelids in the family Polynoidae (scale worms). The genus contains a single species, Antipathipolyeunoa nuttingi, found in the Caribbean Sea at a depth of 91 metres.

== Description ==
Species of Antipathipolyeunoa have 82–84 segments and 40 pairs of elytra; the elytra are large and cover the dorsum completely. Cephalic peaks are also present, and the neuropodia are with a subacicular process.

=== Description of Antipathipolyeunoa nuttingi ===
Specifically, A. nuttingi has 82 segments and 40 pairs of elytra, with a nearly continuous reddish brown longitudinal dorsal pigmentation band with some spots at the base of the dorsal cirri and some midventral pigmentation. The lateral antennae are inserted ventrally (beneath the prostomium and median antenna), and notochaetae are about as thick as neurochaetae. Bidentate neurochaetae are absent.

== Taxonomic comments ==
Antipathypolyeunoa is most similar to another long-bodied genus, Polyeunoa, however Polyeunoa lacks the distinctive subacicular neuropodial process. Parahololepidella also has a subacicular neuropodial process but has 80 or more segments and 67 pairs of very small elytra which only cover the base of the parapodium.

== Biology and ecology ==
Antipathypolyeunoa is one of many genera in the family Polynoidae which have an obligate commensal relationship with a host marine invertebrate. As the name suggests, Antipathypolyeunoa is associated with antipatharian corals (black corals or thorn corals), being found in hollow tubes in the main stems of the coral host.

A. nuttingi's host taxon is Antipathes tanacetum.
