= Bathyeliasona mariaae =

Scientific classification
- Kingdom: Animalia
- Phylum: Annelida
- Clade: Pleistoannelida
- Subclass: Errantia
- Order: Phyllodocida
- Family: Polynoidae
- Genus: Bathyeliasona
- Species: B. mariaae

Binomial name
- Bathyeliasona mariaae Bonifácio & Menot, 2018

Species of annelid

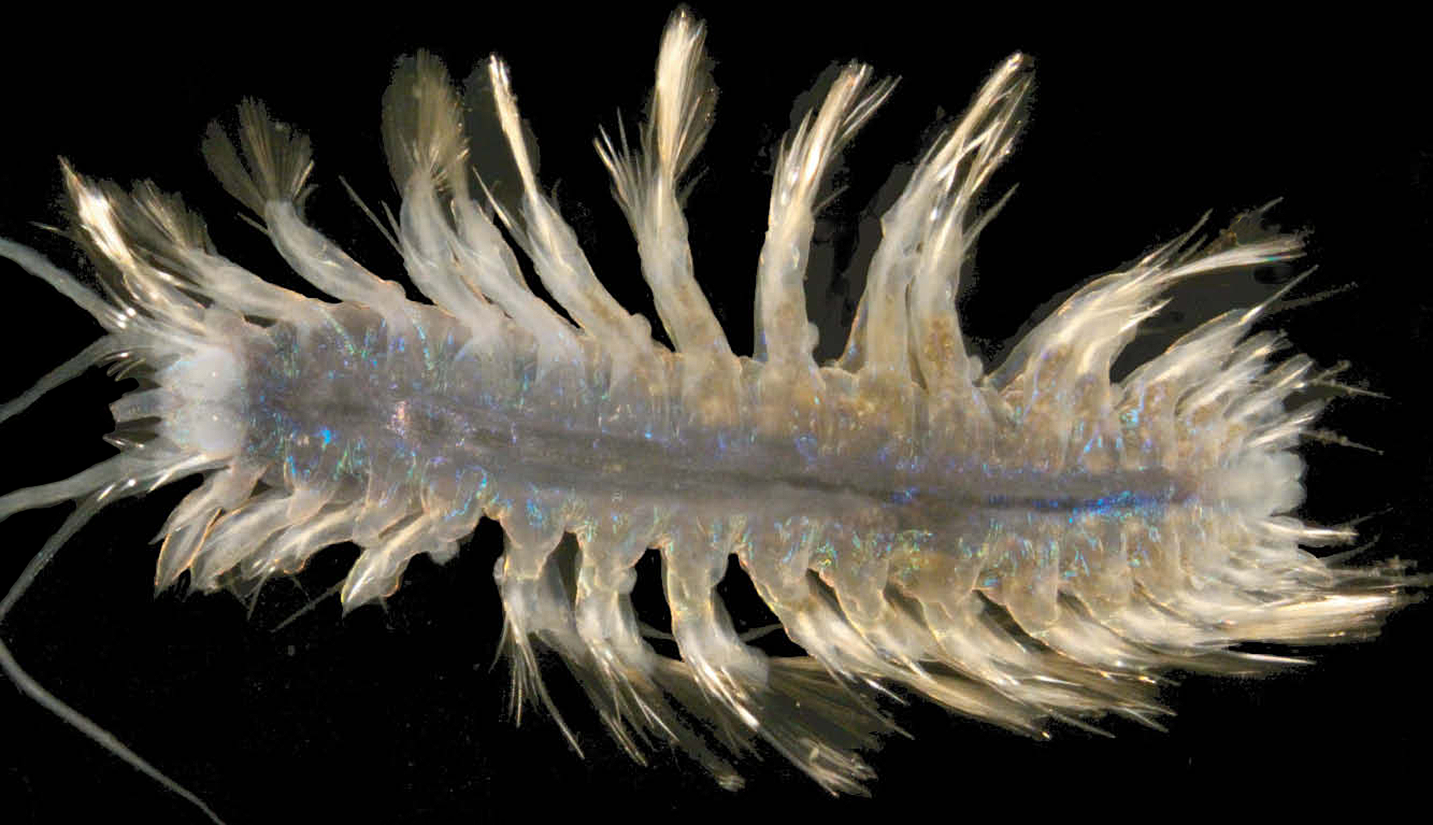

Bathyeliasona mariaae is a deep-sea scale worm which is known from two specimens collected in the north-east Pacific Ocean from depths of 4,328–4,823m.

== Description ==
Bathyeliasona mariaae has 17 segments and the anterior margin of the prostomium comprises a pair of acute anterior projections that extend into long, forward facing filaments. The lateral antennae are also absent. The ventral cirri approach the tip of the neuroacicula. Notochaetae can be of two types: stouter with distinct rows of spines or slender with well-developed rows of spines. One notochaeta per parapodium may be stouter than the neurochaetae.
