= Benhamipolynoe cairnsi =

Scientific classification
- Kingdom: Animalia
- Phylum: Annelida
- Clade: Pleistoannelida
- Subclass: Errantia
- Order: Phyllodocida
- Family: Polynoidae
- Genus: Benhamipolynoe
- Species: B. cairnsi

Binomial name
- Benhamipolynoe cairnsi Pettibone, 1989

Species of annelid worm

Benhamipolynoe cairnsi is known from the south-west Pacific Ocean from depths of about 400–500m

== Description ==
Benhamipolynoe cairnsi has 10 pairs of elytra (fewer than Benhamipolynoe antipathicola) and the preserved specimens studied thus far are not known to be pigmented.

== Biology and Ecology ==
Benhamipolynoe cairnsi has a commensal relationship with the stylasterid coral Conopora adeta.
