= Australaugeneria =

Scientific classification
- Kingdom: Animalia
- Phylum: Annelida
- Clade: Pleistoannelida
- Subclass: Errantia
- Order: Phyllodocida
- Family: Polynoidae
- Genus: Australaugeneria; Pettibone, 1969

Type species
- Polynoe rutilans Grube, 1878

Genus of annelids

Australaugeneria is a genus of marine annelids in the family Polynoidae (scale worms). The genus includes 4 species which are commensal on octocorals.

== Description ==
Elytra 15 pairs, 36–40 segments. Lateral antennae inserted ventrally (beneath prostomium and median antenna). Neuropodia deeply incised vertically, so that the neurochaetae emerge from a prominent division between the pre-chaetal (=acicular) lobe and the post-chaetal lobe. Notochaetae present, hooked neurochaetae in anterior-most segments, bidentate neurochaetae absent (summarised from detailed diagnosis of Ravara & Cunha, 2016).

== Ecology ==
All known species of Australaugeneria appear to be commensals on alcyonacean or gorgonian corals.

== Species ==
Four species of Australaugeneria are accepted as valid as of June 2020:

- Australaugeneria iberica Ravara & Cunha, 2016
- Australaugeneria michaelseni Pettibone, 1969
- Australaugeneria pottsi Pettibone, 1969
- Australaugeneria rutilans (Grube, 1878)
