= Hartmania =

Scientific classification
- Kingdom: Animalia
- Phylum: Annelida
- Clade: Pleistoannelida
- Subclass: Errantia
- Order: Phyllodocida
- Family: Polynoidae
- Genus: Hartmania
- Species: H. moorei

Binomial name
- Hartmania moorei Pettibone, 1955

Genus of annelid worms

Hartmania is a genus of marine polychaete worms belonging to the family Polynoidae, the scaleworms. Hartmania contains a single species, Hartmania moorei which is known from the north-west Atlantic Ocean off the coast of North America from shallow water to depths of about 80 m.

== Description ==
Hartmania moorei is a short-bodied scale worm with about 35 to 37 segments and 15 pairs of elytra. The elytra are large and cover the dorsum completely; they have large tubercles on the surface. The prostomium is bilobed and deeply divided anteriorly with a pair of cephalic peaks with rounded tips. The lateral antennae are inserted ventrally, directly beneath the median antenna ceratophore, and the styles of all antennae have slender papillae. The neuropodium is elongate and tapering. The notochaetae are about as thick as the neurochaetae and all chaetae have serrations in transverse rows and sharply pointed unidentate tips. Neurochaetae with bidentate tips are also absent.

== Biology and Ecology ==
Some specimens of Hartmania moorei have been collected from the tubes of nereidid polychaetes such as Alitta virens and is likely to have a commensal relationship with them.
