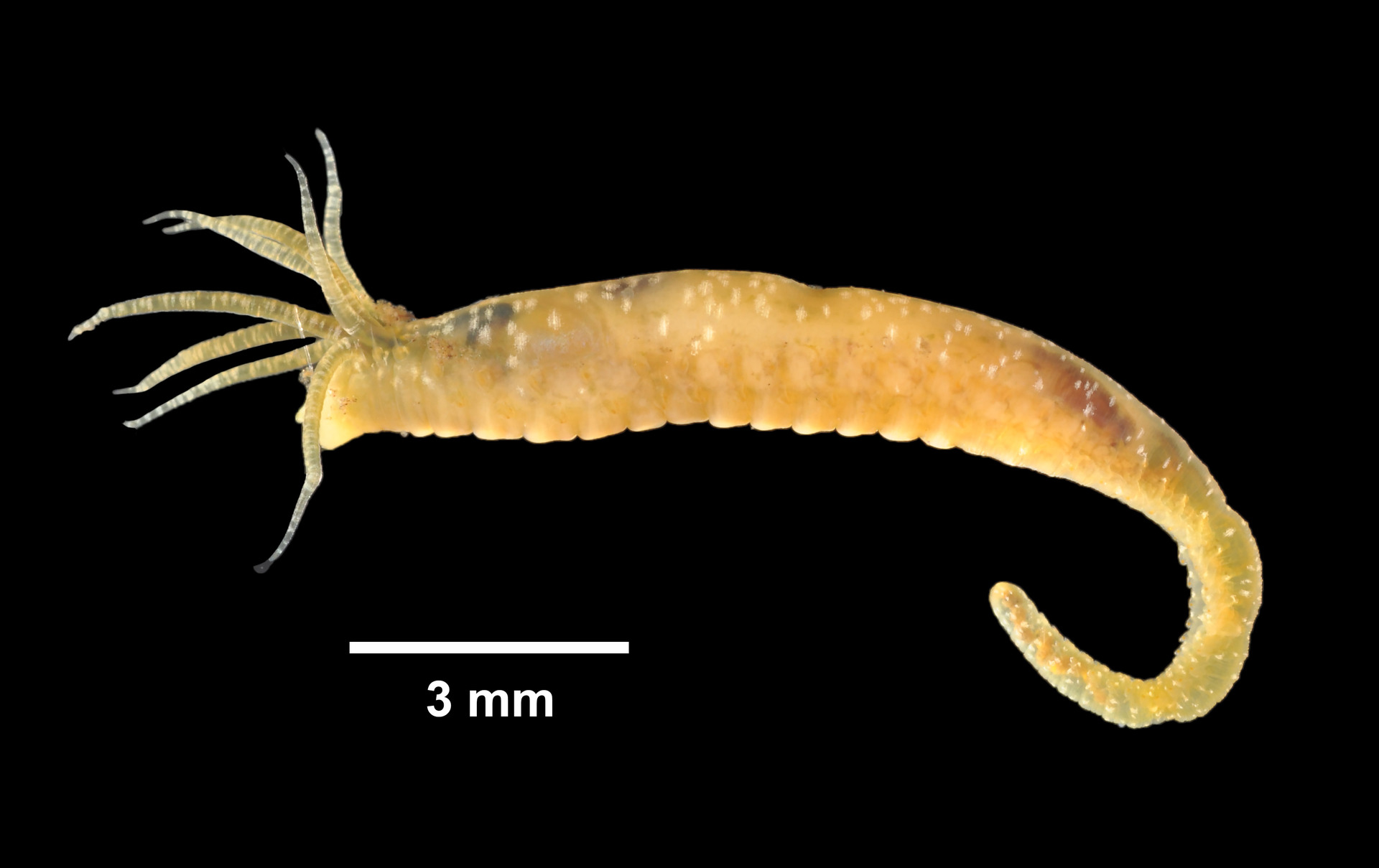

Scientific classification
- Kingdom: Animalia
- Phylum: Annelida
- Clade: Pleistoannelida
- Clade: Sedentaria
- Order: Terebellida
- Family: Ampharetidae
- Genus: Hobsonia; Banse, 1979
- Species: H. florida

Binomial name
- Hobsonia florida (Hartman, 1951)

Synonyms
- Amphicteis gunneri floridus Hartman, 1951; Amphicteis floridus Hartman, 1951; Hypaniola grayi Pettibone, 1953

= Hobsonia florida =

Species of annelid

Hobsonia florida is a small tube-dwelling polychaete worm in the family Ampharetidae. The species was first described in 1951 by Olga Hartman from a specimen taken from Florida's Gulf Coast of Florida. This species lives in intertidal and subtidal zones where it feeds on particles it collects from sediment using its tentacles. Although it is native to the east coast of North America, it has invaded the western coast, where it is not native. Its body length can be anywhere from 8–15 mm in total and in life it is coloured orange with whitish spots on the upper surface. In one study, spawning occurs late May to early September. Within ecosystems, it is an early colonizer that modifies the environment in a way that facilitates the establishment of other species.

== Taxonomy ==
In 1951, Olga Hartman originally described Hobsonia florida in taxonomic literature as Amphicteis gunneri floridus. Later in 1953, zoologist Marian Pettibone independently described the worm as Hypaniola grayi, which was later shifted to the genus Amphisomy. Pettibone later recognised Hypaniola grayi to be a synonym of Amphicteis floridus which was merged to the genus Hypaniola. Finally in 1979, Karl Banse reassigned the only species to a newly established genus, Hobsonia. In 1979, Karl Banse recognized this new genus by highlighting a distinct set of an external traits and anatomical traits and further consider that these characteristics distinguished it from Hypaniola, Amphicteis and Lysippides. The genus name Hobsonia refers to Katharine Hobson, another worm expert.

== Description ==
Individuals typically range from 8–15 mm in length. The eggs are reported to have the dimensions of 0.2 x 0.15 x 0.05 mm. When alive, it is colored orange with whitish to bluish spots on the dorsal (upper) surface, but the body becomes white if preserved in alcohol. In gravid individuals, the bluish eggs can be seen floating inside the worm, which makes it appear blue-green in color. In natural settings, most of the body is hidden in a tube-like structure that is made of sediment particles and other debris. The body has a long, conical shape and has 43 segments in total. Beginning on the fourth segment, there are tuft-like growths on the side of each segment of the mid section of the body. Around the mouth area, there are 20 tentacles that used for feeding and eight branchiae (finger-like protrusions).

== Distribution and habitat ==
Its native range is along the eastern coast of North America, but has also spread to the western coast of North America, where it is an invasive species. It occurs in boreal marine environments in intertidal and subtidal zones in salt marshes near river mouths, intertidal mud and in parts of estuaries. Individuals can tolerate low salinity environments, even surviving in environments where salinity falls to practically zero. In one study, juveniles of H. florida were reared in sea water with salinity of 2.7%.

== Reproduction and life cycle ==
In New Hampshire, spawning reportedly occurs from late May to early September. The sexes are separate. The sperm is released into the water and enters the female's tube via ciliary currents. Once it gets inside the female, the sperm fertilizes the eggs, which are 200 μm wide and are loose within the tube. After the fertilization process, the zygotes then develop into a planktonic trochophore larva which leaves the female's tube once they have reached the three-setiger stage of development. Simultaneously, the larva subsequently undergoes transformation which elongates its body before eventually maturing into the adult form. In one gravid specimen, a total of 100 eggs were found in the body.

== Ecology ==
Video of Hobsonia florida behavior

H. florida and other invertebrates are early colonizers that modify their environment in such a way that it facilitates the establishment of other species — an example of an ecological succession. The diet of H. florida changes as it grows and develops, with juveniles feeding on microscopic plants and animal material before moving on to feeding on detritus particles. It uses tentacles originating from near its mouth to sweep out sections of sediment to feed.

== See also ==
- Annelid
- Bruunilla natalensis
