= Hermadionella =

Scientific classification
- Kingdom: Animalia
- Phylum: Annelida
- Clade: Pleistoannelida
- Subclass: Errantia
- Order: Phyllodocida
- Family: Polynoidae
- Genus: Hermadionella; Uschakov, 1982

Type species
- Hermadionella truncata (Moore, 1902)

Genus of annelid worms

Hermadionella is a genus of marine polychaete worms belonging to the family Polynoidae, the scaleworms. Hermadionella contains 3 species which are known from the north-west Pacific and Arctic Oceans from the intertidal to depths of about 200 m.

== Description ==
Hermadionella are long-bodied scale worms with 50–60 or more segments and 15 pairs of elytra; the posterior-most 15–20 or more segments are thus not covered by elytra. The prostomium is bilobed and rounded anteriorly, lacking acute cephalic peaks. The lateral antennae are inserted ventrally, beneath median antenna and the antennal styles are covered with slender papillae. The neuropodial lobe is elongate, tapering to a slightly rounded tip. The notochaetae have truncate tips and are distinctly thicker than the neurochaetae. Neurochaetae with simple or bidentate tips may both be present.

Hermadionella is distinguished from the similar genus Hermadion by having a longer body (Hermadion have fewer than 50 segments) and notochaetae with truncate tips, which are absent in Hermadion.

== Species ==
As of October 2020, Hermadionella contains three species:

- Hermadionella chayvoensis Alalykina, 2011
- Hermadionella nipponicus (Imajima & Hartman, 1964)
- Hermadionella truncata (Moore, 1902)
