= Verrucapelma conifera =

Scientific classification
- Domain: Eukaryota
- Kingdom: Animalia
- Phylum: Annelida
- Clade: Pleistoannelida
- Subclass: Errantia
- Order: Phyllodocida
- Family: Polynoidae
- Genus: Verrucapelma
- Species: V. conifera

Binomial name
- Verrucapelma conifera Barnich, Sun and Fiege 2004

Species of annelid worm

Verrucapelma nigricans is a scale worm, known from intertidal habitats in the South China Sea.

== Description ==
Verrucapelma conifera is a short-bodied scale worms with up to about 38 segments and 15 pairs of elytra, the margins of which have a few marginal papillae. The prostomium is bilobed anteriorly and has a pair of cephalic peaks. The lateral antennae are located ventrally, directly beneath the median antenna and the distal part of the antennae have slender papillae. The neuropodial lobe is elongate and tapering and has two or three distinctive wart-like tubercles along the ventral edge. The notochaetae are about as thick as the neurochaetae and both are ornamented with transverse rows of small spines. The notochaetae are unidentate with distinctly pointed tips while the neurochaetae are all bidentate.
