= Adyte =

Scientific classification
- Domain: Eukaryota
- Kingdom: Animalia
- Phylum: Annelida
- Clade: Pleistoannelida
- Subclass: Errantia
- Order: Phyllodocida
- Family: Polynoidae
- Genus: Adyte; Saint-Joseph, 1899
- Species: A. hyalina

Binomial name
- Adyte hyalina (G.O. Sars, 1873)

Synonyms
- Adyte assimilis (McIntosh, 1876); Hermadion assimile McIntosh, 1874; Hermadion echini Giard, 1886; Scalisetosus assimilis (Mc Intosh, 1900)

Genus of annelids

Adyte hyalina is a species of marine annelids in the family Polynoidae (scale worms) and the only accepted species in the genus Adyte. Adyte hyalina occurs in the North-east Atlantic Ocean and Mediterranean Sea, at depths down to about 150 metres.

== Description ==
Adyte hyalina is colourless or yellowish, up to thirty millimetres long, and has a dark band running down its back. Adyte hyalina is a long-bodied scale-worm with up to about 70 segments and 15 pairs of elytra, leaving the long tail uncovered. The prostomium is rounded anteriorly (without peaks) and with three antennae; the lateral antennae are inserted ventrally to the median antenna. Parapodia with elongate acicular lobes are present, with both acicula penetrating the epidermis in notopodium but not neuropodium. The notochaetae are stout, with few rows of spines and slightly notched tip. The neurochaetae are more slender and more numerous, have faint rows of spines distally, and feature minutely bidentate or simple (unidentate) tips.

== Distribution ==
The species is found in the Pacific, Indian and Atlantic Ocean, the Mediterranean Sea, the Red Sea and the Bosporus, the English Channel and the North Sea.

== Biology ==
The species is widely distributed round the shores of Britain where it is found on the lower shore and always in association with the sea urchin, Echinus esculentus, among whose spines it lives. It ranges from the littoral to the sublittoral zones and is often associated with starfish, brittle stars and feather stars. It is an omnivore and both a scavenger and a predator.
