= Tottonpolynoe =

Scientific classification
- Kingdom: Animalia
- Phylum: Annelida
- Clade: Pleistoannelida
- Subclass: Errantia
- Order: Phyllodocida
- Family: Polynoidae
- Genus: Tottonpolynoe; Pettibone, 1991
- Species: T. symantipatharia

Binomial name
- Tottonpolynoe symantipatharia Pettibone, 1991

Genus of annelid worms

Tottonpolynoe is a genus of marine polychaete worms belonging to the family Polynoidae, the scaleworms. Tottonpolynoe contains a single species, Tottonpolynoe symantipatharia. It is known from the South Pacific Ocean and Southern Ocean at depths of about 800 to 1,700 m (2,600 to 5,600 ft).

== Description ==
Tottonpolynoe symantipatharia is a long-bodied scale worm comprising between 55 and 71 segments with 16 pairs of elytra. The elytra are large, delicate and cover the dorsum on the anterior part of the body but not on posterior segments. The prostomium is bilobed with widely spaced triangular cephalic peaks. The lateral antennae are inserted ventrally, directly beneath the median antenna ceratophore. The neuropodium is elongate and tapering. The notochaetae are smooth and about as thick as neurochaetae. The neurochaetae have serrations in transverse rows and sharply pointed unidentate tips. Neurochaetae with bidentate tips are also absent.

== Ecology ==
Tottonpolynoe symantipatharia has a commensal relationship with antipatharian and gorgonian corals.
