= Chaetacanthus =

Chaetacanthus may refer to:

- Chaetacanthus (annelid), a genus of polychaetes in the family Polynoidae
- Chaetacanthus, a genus of plants in the family Acanthaceae, synonym of Dyschoriste
