= Australaugeneria michaelseni =

Scientific classification
- Kingdom: Animalia
- Phylum: Annelida
- Clade: Pleistoannelida
- Subclass: Errantia
- Order: Phyllodocida
- Family: Polynoidae
- Genus: Australaugeneria
- Species: A. michaelseni

Binomial name
- Australaugeneria michaelseni Pettibone, 1969

Species of annelid worm

Australaugeneria michaelseni is a scale worm known from northern Australia and Papua New Guinea from depths of 30m or less.

== Description ==
Number of segments 36; elytra 15 pairs. Depigmented. Lateral antennae inserted ventrally (beneath prostomium and median antenna). Notochaetae about as thick as neurochaetae. Bidentate neurochaetae absent.

== Commensalism ==
Australaugeneria michaelseni is commensal. Its host taxa are alcyonacean corals.
