= Acholoe squamosa =

Scientific classification
- Kingdom: Animalia
- Phylum: Annelida
- Clade: Pleistoannelida
- Subclass: Errantia
- Order: Phyllodocida
- Family: Polynoidae
- Genus: Acholoe; Claparède, 1870
- Species: A. squamosa

Binomial name
- Acholoe squamosa (Delle Chiaje, 1827)

Synonyms
- Species synonymy: Acholoe astericola (Delle Chiaje, 1841); Acholoe orbiculata Treadwell, 1921; Nereis squamosa Delle Chiaje, 1827; Polynoa asterinae Carrington, 1865; Polynoe astericola Delle Chiaje, 1841; Polynoe malleata Grube, 1855

Genus of annelids

Acholoe squamosa is a species in the family Polynoidae (scale worms) and the only species in the genus Acholoe; it occurs in the Mediterranean Sea and North-east Atlantic Ocean.

== Description ==
Body long, with numerous segments (50 to more than 100) and numerous pairs of elytra on segments 2, 4, 5, then on alternate segments to 23 and on every third segment thereafter. The prostomium is anteriorly rounded (without peaks) and the lateral antennae are inserted terminoventrally. Parapodia with elongate acicular lobes with both acicula penetrating epidermis. The notochaetae are stout, with distinct rows of spines and blunt tips; the neurochaetae are unidentate (lack a secondary tooth at the tips) (see Barnich & Fiege, 2003 for more detailed diagnosis).
