= Verrucapelma nigricans =

Scientific classification
- Kingdom: Animalia
- Phylum: Annelida
- Clade: Pleistoannelida
- Subclass: Errantia
- Order: Phyllodocida
- Family: Polynoidae
- Genus: Verrucapelma
- Species: V. nigricans

Binomial name
- Verrucapelma nigricans (Horst, 1915)

Species of annelid worm

Verrucapelma nigricans is a scale worm known from the South China Sea from intertidal habitats.

== Description ==
Verrucapelma nigricans is a short-bodied scale worm with up to about 39 segments and 15 pairs of elytra, the margins of which have a numerous long marginal papillae. The prostomium is bilobed anteriorly and has a pair of cephalic peaks. The lateral antennae are located ventrally, directly beneath the median antenna and the distal part of the antennae have slender papillae. The neuropodial lobe is elongate and tapering and has two or three distinctive wart-like tubercles along the ventral edge. The notochaetae are about as thick as the neurochaetae and both are ornamented with transverse rows of small spines. The notochaetae are unidentate with blunt tips while the neurochaetae are all bidentate.
