= Australaugeneria pottsi =

Scientific classification
- Kingdom: Animalia
- Phylum: Annelida
- Clade: Pleistoannelida
- Subclass: Errantia
- Order: Phyllodocida
- Family: Polynoidae
- Genus: Australaugeneria
- Species: A. pottsi

Binomial name
- Australaugeneria pottsi Pettibone, 1969

Species of annelid worm

Australaugeneria pottsi is a scale worm known from northern Australia from depths of 21m or less.

== Description ==
Number of segments 38; elytra 15 pairs. Depigmented. Lateral antennae inserted ventrally (beneath prostomium and median antenna). Notochaetae distinctly thicker than neurochaetae, or thinner than neurochaetae. Bidentate neurochaetae absent.

== Commensalism ==
A. pottsi is commensal. Its host taxa are alcyonacean corals.
