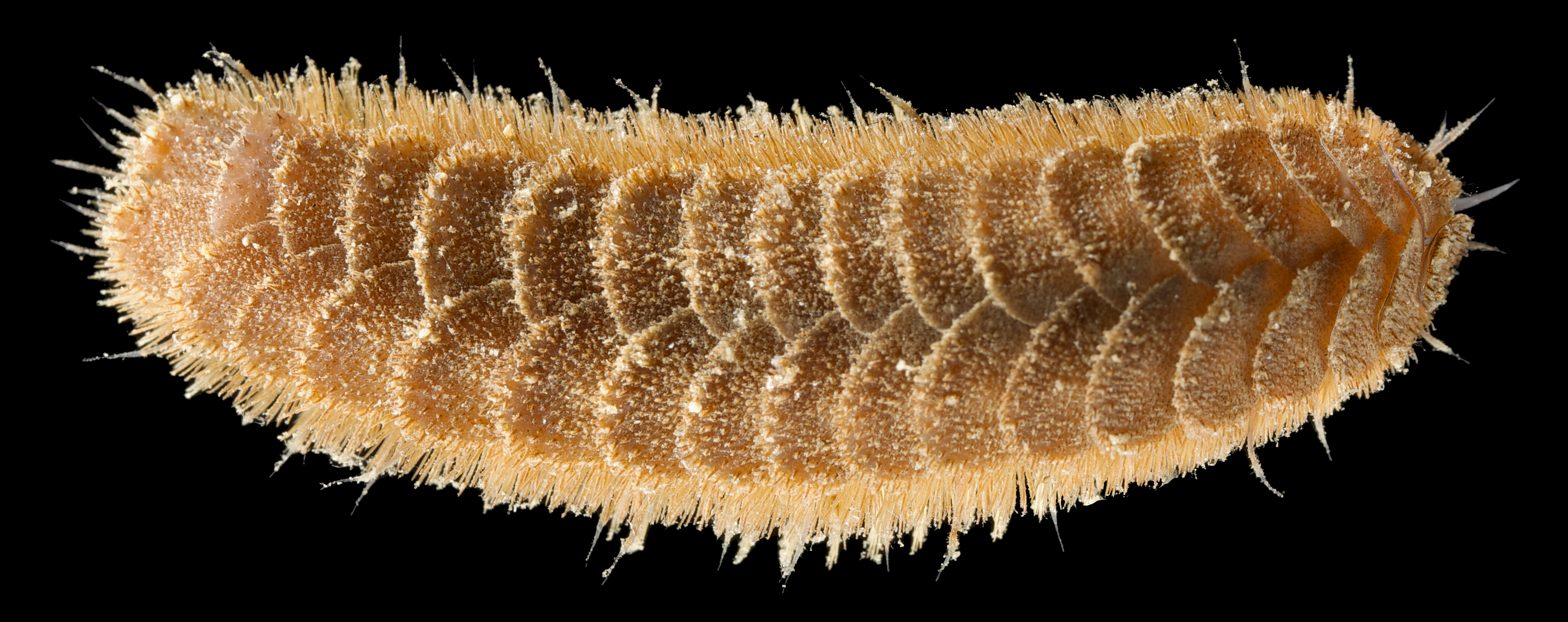
- Acanthicolepis asperrima

Scientific classification
- Kingdom: Animalia
- Phylum: Annelida
- Clade: Pleistoannelida
- Subclass: Errantia
- Order: Phyllodocida
- Family: Polynoidae
- Genus: Acanthicolepis; McIntosh, 1900

Type species
- Polynoe asperrima M. Sars, 1861

= Acanthicolepis =

Genus of annelids

Acanthicolepis is a genus of marine annelids in the family Polynoidae (scale worms). The genus was described in 1990 and includes two short-bodied species with up to 50 segments and which occur in the Mediterranean Sea and North-east Atlantic Ocean.

== Description ==
Body short, with up to 50 segments and 18 pairs of elytra on segments 2, 4, 5, 7, 9, 11, 13, 15, 17, 19, 21, 23, 26, 29, 32, 34, 35, and 38. The prostomium has a pair of anterior peaks and the lateral antennae are inserted terminoventrally. Parapodia with both dorsal (notopodial) and ventral (neuropodial) acicula penetrating epidermis. The notochaetae are stout, with numerous rows of spines; the neurochaetae are more slender and include both unidentate (lack a secondary tooth at the tips) and bidentate forms (see Barnich & Fiege, 2010 for detailed diagnosis).

== Species ==
Two valid species of Acanthicolepis are recognised as of June 2020:

- Acanthicolepis asperrima (M. Sars, 1861)
- Acanthicolepis zibrowii Barnich & Fiege, 2010
