= Bathyeliasona kirkegaardi =

Scientific classification
- Kingdom: Animalia
- Phylum: Annelida
- Clade: Pleistoannelida
- Subclass: Errantia
- Order: Phyllodocida
- Family: Polynoidae
- Genus: Bathyeliasona
- Species: B. kirkegaardi

Binomial name
- Bathyeliasona kirkegaardi (Uschakov, 1971)

Species of annelid worm

Bathyeliasona kirkegaardi is a deep-sea scale worm which is only known to occur in the Pacific Ocean, where it is recorded from a depth range of about 5,500–8,000 m.

== Description ==
Bathyeliasona kirkegaardi has 17 segments, with 8 pairs of elytra and no pigmentation. The anterior margin of the prostomium comprises a pair of acute anterior projection and the lateral antennae are absent. The notochaetae are thinner than the neurochaetae, with bidentate neurochaetae absent.
