= Wilsoniella =

Wilsoniella may refer to:

- Wilsoniella (brachiopod) Khalfin, 1939, a fossil genus of brachiopods in the family Trigonirhynchiidae
- Wilsoniella Eichler, 1940, an unaccepted genus of lice in the family Philopteridae; synonym of Pessoaiella
- Wilsoniella Pettibone, 1993, an unaccepted genus of annelids in the family Polynoidae; synonym of Pettibonesia
- Wilsoniella (plant), a genus of mosses in the family Ditrichaceae
