= Benhamisetosus =

Scientific classification
- Domain: Eukaryota
- Kingdom: Animalia
- Phylum: Annelida
- Clade: Pleistoannelida
- Subclass: Errantia
- Order: Phyllodocida
- Family: Polynoidae
- Genus: Benhamisetosus; Averincev, 1978

Type species
- Benhamisetosus australiensis (Benham, 1915)

Genus of annelid worms

Benhamisetosus is a genus of marine annelids in the family Polynoidae (scale worms). The genus contains a single species, Benhamisetosus australiensis, known from the south coast of Australia and the Tasman Sea.

== Description ==
In Benhamisetosus australiensis the number of pairs of elytra is unknown since the type specimens are incomplete. The lateral antennae are inserted ventrally (beneath the prostomium and median antenna) and the neuropodia are elongate and tapering. The notochaetae are about as thick as the neurochaetae. The neurochaetae each have a distinctive half-moon shaped pocket on one side formed by a curved row of fine teeth, and neurochaetae with both unidentate and bidentate tips are present.
