= Hermadionella truncata =

Scientific classification
- Kingdom: Animalia
- Phylum: Annelida
- Clade: Pleistoannelida
- Subclass: Errantia
- Order: Phyllodocida
- Family: Polynoidae
- Genus: Hermadionella
- Species: H. truncata

Binomial name
- Hermadionella truncata (Moore, 1902)

Species of annelid worm

Hermadionella truncata is a scale worm known from the north-west Pacific and Arctic Oceans at depths down to about 200 m.

== Description ==
Hermadionella truncata has up to about 60 segments with 15 pairs of elytra. The lateral antennae are positioned ventrally on the prostomium, directly beneath the median antenna. Notochaetae are distinctly thicker than the neurochaetae, and the neurochaetae bear bidentate tips.
