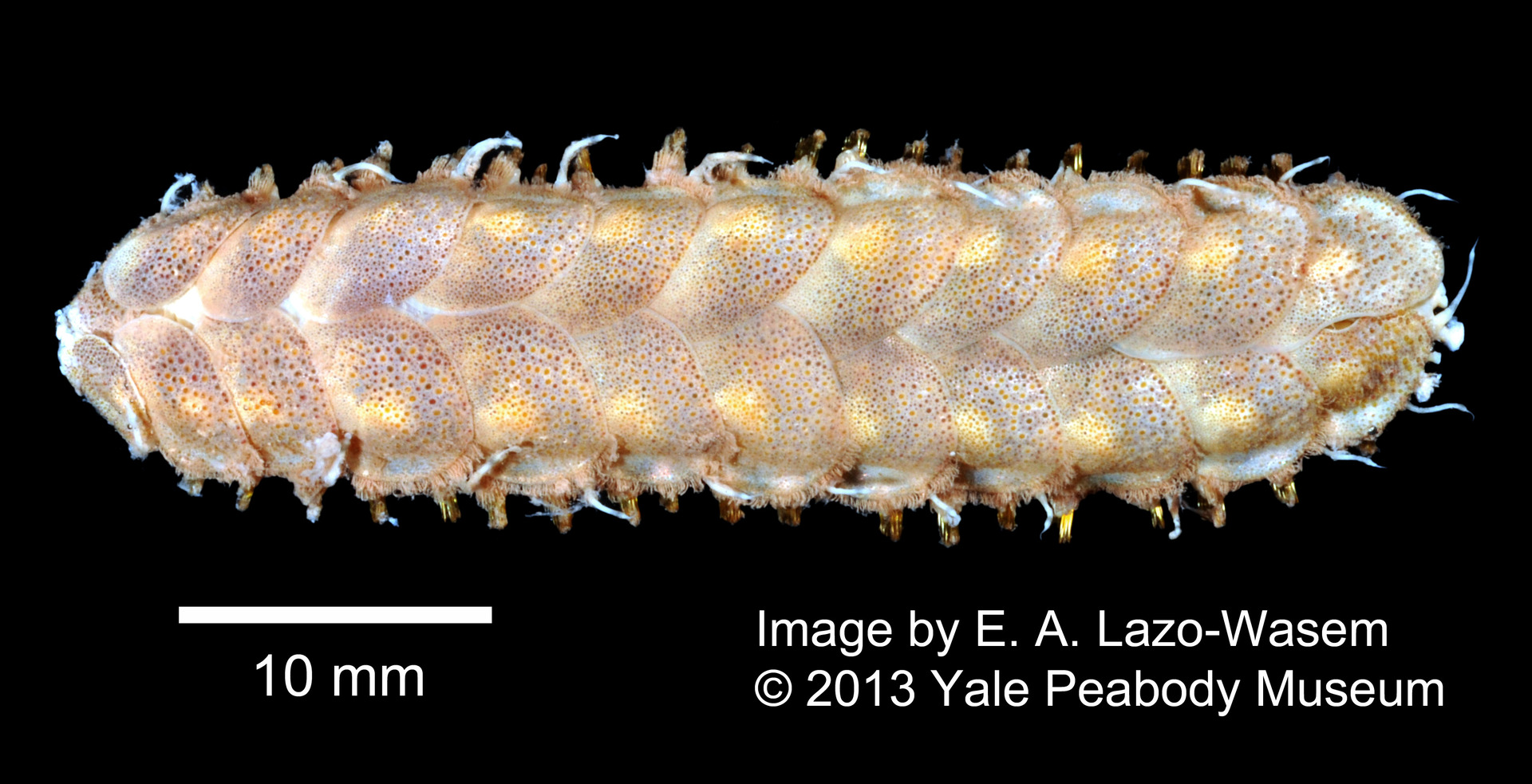
- Lepidonotus squamatus

Scientific classification
- Kingdom: Animalia
- Phylum: Annelida
- Clade: Pleistoannelida
- Subclass: Errantia
- Order: Phyllodocida
- Family: Polynoidae
- Genus: Lepidonotus; Leach, 1816

Type species
- Aphrodita clava Montagu, 1808

= Lepidonotus =

Genus of annelids

Lepidonotus is a genus of marine annelids in the family Polynoidae (scale worms). The genus occurs globally and includes 80 species, usually found in shallow waters down to about 80 metres.

== Description ==
Body dorsoventrally flattened, short, with 26 segments and 12 pairs of elytra on segments 2, 4, 5, 7, 9, 11, 13, 15, 17, 19, 21, and 23. Prostomium with three antennae; lateral antennae continuous with prostomium, laterally to median antenna. Parapodia with elongate acicular lobes with both acicula penetrating epidermis. Notochaetae slender and densely serrated. Neurochaetae much more stout, with rows of spines distally and unidentate and/or bidentate tips (see Barnich & Fiege, 2003 for detailed diagnosis) .

== Species ==
The following species of Lepidonotus were accepted as valid as of June 2020:

- Lepidonotus adspersus (Grube, 1878)
- Lepidonotus aeololepis Haswell, 1883
- Lepidonotus albopustulatus Horst, 1915
- Lepidonotus ambigua Knox, 1960
- Lepidonotus angustus Verrill, 1873
- Lepidonotus antillarum (Schmarda, 1861)
- Lepidonotus arenosus Ehlers, 1901
- Lepidonotus austera (Grube, 1878)
- Lepidonotus australiensis Seidler, 1924
- Lepidonotus australis (Schmarda, 1861)
- Lepidonotus banksi Knox, 1951
- Lepidonotus bicornis (Uschakov, 1982)
- Lepidonotus bowerbanki Baird, 1865
- Lepidonotus brasiliensis (Quatrefages, 1866)
- Lepidonotus brevicornis Quatrefages, 1865
- Lepidonotus brunneus Day, 1975
- Lepidonotus caelorus Moore, 1903
- Lepidonotus caeruleus Kinberg, 1856
- Lepidonotus carinulatus (Grube, 1869)
- Lepidonotus citrifrons Augener, 1906
- Lepidonotus clava (Montagu, 1808)
- Lepidonotus cristatus (Grube, 1876)
- Lepidonotus crosslandi Monro, 1928
- Lepidonotus cryptocephalus (Grube, 1878)
- Lepidonotus dentatus Okuda in Okuda & Yamada, 1954
- Lepidonotus durbanensis Day, 1934
- Lepidonotus elongatus Marenzeller, 1902
- Lepidonotus fiordlandicus Knox, 1956
- Lepidonotus furcillatus Ehlers, 1901
- Lepidonotus fusicirrus (Schmarda, 1861)
- Lepidonotus glaber Imajima, 1997
- Lepidonotus glaucus (Peters, 1854)
- Lepidonotus hainanicus Uschakov, 1982
- Lepidonotus havaicus Kinberg, 1856
- Lepidonotus hedleyi Benham, 1915
- Lepidonotus helotypus (Grube, 1877)
- Lepidonotus hermenioides Amoureux, 1974
- Lepidonotus hupferi Augener, 1918
- Lepidonotus impatiens (Savigny in Lamarck, 1818)
- Lepidonotus jacksoni Kinberg, 1855
- Lepidonotus javanicus Horst, 1917
- Lepidonotus lacteus (Ehlers, 1887)
- Lepidonotus lissolepis Haswell, 1883
- Lepidonotus magnatuberculata Seidler, 1923
- Lepidonotus malayanus Horst, 1915
- Lepidonotus margaritaceus Kinberg, 1856
- Lepidonotus melanogrammus Haswell, 1883
- Lepidonotus natalensis Day, 1951
- Lepidonotus nesophilus Chamberlin, 1919
- Lepidonotus oculatus Baird, 1865
- Lepidonotus onisciformis Ehlers, 1918
- Lepidonotus panamensis Hartman, 1939
- Lepidonotus pellucidus Dyster in Johnston, 1865
- Lepidonotus permixturus Hanley & Burke, 1991
- Lepidonotus polae Wehe, 2006
- Lepidonotus polychromus Schmarda, 1861
- Lepidonotus purpureus Potts, 1910
- Lepidonotus pustulatus Potts, 1910
- Lepidonotus rossii Leach in Ross, 1819
- Lepidonotus ruber Horst, 1917
- Lepidonotus sagamianus (Izuka, 1912)
- Lepidonotus savignyi (Grube, 1856)
- Lepidonotus scanlandi Hanley & Burke, 1991
- Lepidonotus scoticensis Nolte, 1936
- Lepidonotus semisculptus Johnston, 1865
- Lepidonotus semitectus (Stimpson, 1856)
- Lepidonotus simplicipes Haswell, 1883
- Lepidonotus spiculus (Treadwell, 1906)
- Lepidonotus spinosus Hanley & Burke, 1991
- Lepidonotus squamatus (Linnaeus, 1758)
- Lepidonotus stellatus Baird, 1865
- Lepidonotus stephensoni Monro, 1931
- Lepidonotus sublevis Verrill, 1873
- Lepidonotus tenuisetosus (Gravier, 1902)
- Lepidonotus tomentosus (Grube, 1856)
- Lepidonotus torresiensis Haswell, 1883
- Lepidonotus vandersandei Horst, 1917
- Lepidonotus variabilis Webster, 1879
- Lepidonotus wahlbergi Kinberg, 1856
- Lepidonotus yorkianus Augener, 1922
