= Parahololepidella =

Scientific classification
- Kingdom: Animalia
- Phylum: Annelida
- Clade: Pleistoannelida
- Subclass: Errantia
- Order: Phyllodocida
- Family: Polynoidae
- Genus: Parahololepidella; Pettibone, 1969

Type species
- Parahololepidella greeffi (Augener 1918)

Genus of annelid worms

Parahololepidella is a genus of marine annelids in the family Polynoidae (scale worms). The genus contains a single species, Parahololepidella greeffi, This species is known from the east equatorial Atlantic Ocean and Cape Verde Islands at a maximum depth of 30m.

== Description ==
Species of Parahololepidella are long-bodied, with 130 or more segments and 60 or more pairs of elytra, which continue to the end of the body. The elytra are smooth and very small, leaving most of the parapodia and dorsum uncovered. The neuropodia have a sub-acicular process, and the notochaetae are more slender than neurochaetae, none of which are bidentate. Cephalic peaks are also present on the prostomium.

=== Description of Parahololepidella greeffi ===
Specifically, P. greeffi has 136 segments and 67 pairs of elytra. The dorsum is a greyish-yellow with a median purple band and there are dark spots near the base of the parapodia. The lateral antennae are inserted ventrally (beneath the prostomium and median antenna), and the notochaetae are thinner than the neurochaetae. Bidentate neurochaetae are also absent.

== Taxonomic comments ==
Parahololepidella is distinguished from other scale worms by the subacicular neuropodial process and having numerous (50–60 or more pairs) of very small elytra which only cover the base of the parapodium.

== Biology and Ecology ==
P. greeffi is a commensal organism. Its host are antipatharian corals in the genus Tanacetipathes.
