= Bylgides groenlandicus =

Scientific classification
- Kingdom: Animalia
- Phylum: Annelida
- Clade: Pleistoannelida
- Subclass: Errantia
- Order: Phyllodocida
- Family: Polynoidae
- Genus: Bylgides
- Species: B. groenlandicus

Binomial name
- Bylgides groenlandicus (Malmgren, 1867)

Species of annelid

Bygides groenlandicus is a marine scale worm that lives in cold waters.

== Description ==
It has 39 segments and is 70 millimeters (about 2.76 inches) in length. It possesses very long, filamentous chaetae. It scales are brown on its dorsal, medial, and posterior sides, and its ventral side is grey or colorless. Two bands of lighter color run across its dorsal side.

== Distribution ==
It is found in the Arctic and North Atlantic waters, as well as off the coast of Massachusetts, the Gulf of Maine, and Newfoundland.
