= Uncopolynoe =

Scientific classification
- Domain: Eukaryota
- Kingdom: Animalia
- Phylum: Annelida
- Clade: Pleistoannelida
- Subclass: Errantia
- Order: Phyllodocida
- Family: Polynoidae
- Genus: Uncopolynoe
- Species: U. corallicola

Binomial name
- Uncopolynoe corallicola Hartmann-Schröder 1960

Genus of annelid worms

Uncopolynoe is a genus of marine polychaete worms belonging to the family Polynoidae, the scaleworms. Uncopolynoe contains a single species, Uncopolynoe corallicola which is known from the Red Sea at a depth of 1 m.

== Description ==
Uncopolynoe corallicola is a short-bodied scale worm with 40–45 segments and 12 pairs of elytra. The prostomium is weakly bilobed anteriorly and lacks cephalic peaks. The lateral antennae lack basal ceratophores and arise directly from the anterior margin of the prostomium. The median antenna has a ceratophore which is located between and slightly beneath the lateral antennae. Notopodia are absent and neuropodia are inconspicuous after segment 4. Notochaetae are absent, but there are three types of neurochaetae: stout curved hooks, curved club-shaped forms and bidentate chaetae.

== Biology and Ecology ==
All known specimens of Uncopolynoe have been collected from alcyonarian corals and most likely have a commensal relationship with them.
