= Bathyadmetella =

Scientific classification
- Kingdom: Animalia
- Phylum: Annelida
- Clade: Pleistoannelida
- Subclass: Errantia
- Order: Phyllodocida
- Family: Polynoidae
- Genus: Bathyadmetella; Pettibone, 1967

Type species
- Bathyadmetella commando Pettibone, 1967

Genus of annelid worms

Bathyadmetella is a genus of marine annelids in the family Polynoidae (scale worms). The only species in the genus, Bathyadmetella commando, is known from a single specimen collected at 1646m in the north-west Pacific Ocean.

== Description of Bathyadmetella commando ==
Bathyadmetella commando has 58 segments and 23 pairs of elytra, with reddish-brown body pigmentation. The lateral antennae are inserted terminally on the anterior margin of the prostomium, with auxiliary appendages at the base of the lateral antennae. Bidentate neurochaetae are absent.
