= Verrucapelma retusa =

Scientific classification
- Domain: Eukaryota
- Kingdom: Animalia
- Phylum: Annelida
- Clade: Pleistoannelida
- Subclass: Errantia
- Order: Phyllodocida
- Family: Polynoidae
- Genus: Verrucapelma
- Species: V. retusa

Binomial name
- Verrucapelma retusa Hanley & Burke, 1991

Species of annelid worm

Verrucapelma retusa is a scale worm known from northern Australia, the Timor Sea and the Coral Sea from shallow water to depths of about 20 m.

== Description ==
Verrucapelma retusa is a short-bodied worm with 35–36 segments and 15 pairs of elytra which bear a marginal fringe of papillae. The dorsum is covered with bands of brown-grey, which becomes fainter posteriorly. Lateral antennae are positioned beneath (ventral) on the prostomium. the notochaetae are about as thick as the neurochaetae. Neurochaetae with bidentate tips are also present.
