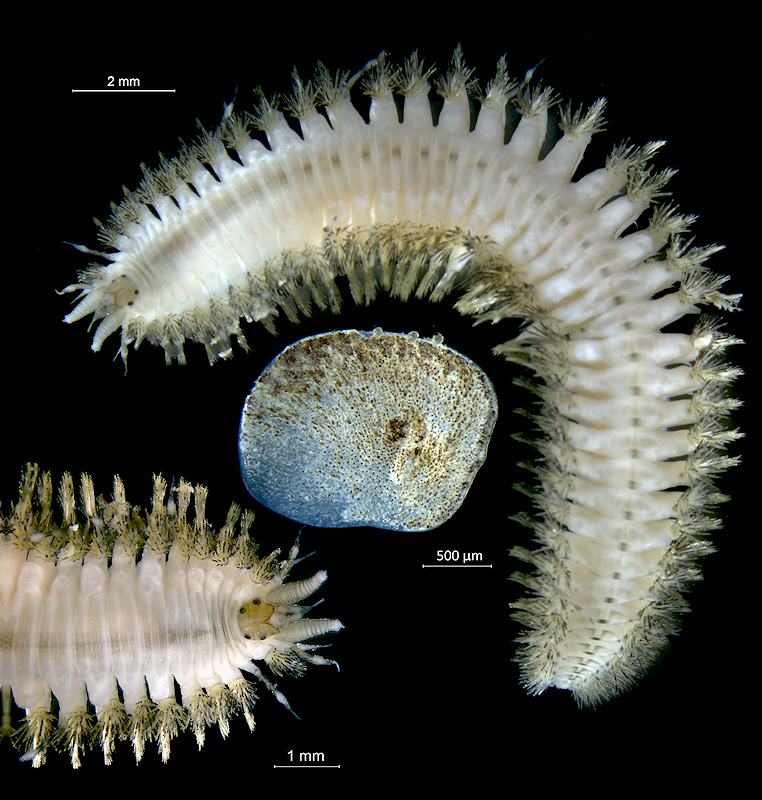

Scientific classification
- Kingdom: Animalia
- Phylum: Annelida
- Clade: Pleistoannelida
- Subclass: Errantia
- Order: Phyllodocida
- Family: Polynoidae
- Genus: Lepidonotus
- Species: L. squamatus

Binomial name
- Lepidonotus squamatus (Linnaeus, 1758)

Synonyms
- Aphrodita armadillo Bosc, 1802; Aphrodita longirostra Bruguière, 1789; Aphrodita pedunculata Pennant, 1777; Aphrodita punctata Müller, 1771; Aphrodita squamata Linnaeus, 1758; Lepidonote armadillo (Bosc, 1802) sensu Leidy, 1855; Lepidonote punctata Örsted, 1843; Lepidonotus granularis Leach in Johnston, 1865; Lepidonotus verrucosus Leach in Johnston, 1865; Polinoe scutellata Risso, 1826; Polynoe dasypus Quatrefages, 1866; Polynoe inflatae Castelnau, 1842; Polynoe punctata Castelnau, 1842; Polynoe squamata Savigny in Lamarck, 1818

= Lepidonotus squamatus =

Species of annelid worm

Lepidonotus squamatus is a species of polychaete worm, commonly known as a "scale worm", in the family Polynoidae. This species occurs in both the Atlantic and the Pacific Oceans. It was first described by the Swedish naturalist Carl Linnaeus in 1758 as Aphrodita squamata but was later transferred to the genus Lepidonotus.

== Description ==
The prostomium has two lobes and bears several pairs of antennae, a pair of palps and two pairs of eyes. The dorsal surface of the body, which has uniform width, is completely concealed by two rows of overlapping scales, resembling fish scales. These scales are modified cirri and are supported on short stalks. They are covered in tubercles of varying sizes, and have a fringe of papillae. This worm has 26 segments and grows to a length of about 5 cm (2 in); it is some shade of grey, drab brown or yellow, often being covered with mud.

== Distribution and habitat ==
Lepidonotus squamatus occurs in Western Europe, including the North Sea, the Skagerrak, the Kattegat, the Öresund Strait and the western Baltic Sea. It is also present on the eastern seaboard of North America from Labrador southward to New Jersey and on the western seaboard from Alaska to California. It occurs in the littoral zone and the sublittoral zone at depths down to about 2,700 m (8,900 ft). Its habitat is typically beneath stones or among tangled growth.

== Ecology ==
Scale worms play a role on the seabed similar to that of isopods (pill bugs or woodlice) on land. They are carnivorous, feeding on crabs, starfish, gastropod molluscs and any other small invertebrate they come across.

The scales of Lepidonotus squamatus emit a faint bioluminescent glow. This is a defensive mechanism, because any predator feeding on the worm is likely to acquire some scales which will adhere to its mouthparts; these will make it more visible, alerting its own predators to its whereabouts.
