= Australaugeneria iberica =

Scientific classification
- Domain: Eukaryota
- Kingdom: Animalia
- Phylum: Annelida
- Clade: Pleistoannelida
- Subclass: Errantia
- Order: Phyllodocida
- Family: Polynoidae
- Genus: Australaugeneria
- Species: A. iberica

Binomial name
- Australaugeneria iberica Ravara & Cunha, 2016

Species of annelid worm

Australaugeneria iberica is a scale worm known from the Gulf of Cadiz in the north-east Atlantic Ocean from a depth of 2230m.

== Taxonomic status ==
Australaugeneria iberica, known from a depth of 2230 m, is the only bathyal species in the genus; the remaining 3 species are known from depths of 30 m or less.

== Description ==
Elytra 15 pairs (presumably; all 3 type specimens incomplete). Unpigmented. Lateral antennae inserted ventrally (beneath prostomium and median antenna). Notochaetae thinner than neurochaetae.

== Commensalism ==
A. iberica is commensal. Its host taxa are alcyonacean corals such as Acanella or a similar genera.
