= Vampiropolynoe =

Scientific classification
- Domain: Eukaryota
- Kingdom: Animalia
- Phylum: Annelida
- Clade: Pleistoannelida
- Subclass: Errantia
- Order: Phyllodocida
- Family: Polynoidae
- Genus: Vampiropolynoe
- Species: V. embleyi

Binomial name
- Vampiropolynoe embleyi Marcus and Hourdez 2002

Genus of annelid worms

Vampiropolynoe is a genus of marine polychaete worms belonging to the family Polynoidae, the scaleworms. Vampiropolynoe contains a single species, Vampiropolynoe embleyi which is known from hydrothermal vents in the South Pacific Ocean at a depth of about 1500 m.

== Description ==
Vampiropolynoe embleyi is a short-bodied scale worm with 44 to 45 segments and 10 pairs of elytra which overlap but leave the mid dorsum exposed and are thin, translucent and smooth. The prostomium is bilobed and has an anterior notch which is where the median antenna is located. Cephalic peaks and lateral antennae are absent on the prostomium, but a pair of filaments are present on the front margin of the prostomium. The neuropodium is elongate and tapering. The notochaetae are smooth and distinctly thicker than neurochaetae. The upper neurochaetae are flattened with a row of serrations or spines along each margin. Neurochaetae with bidentate tips are also absent.
