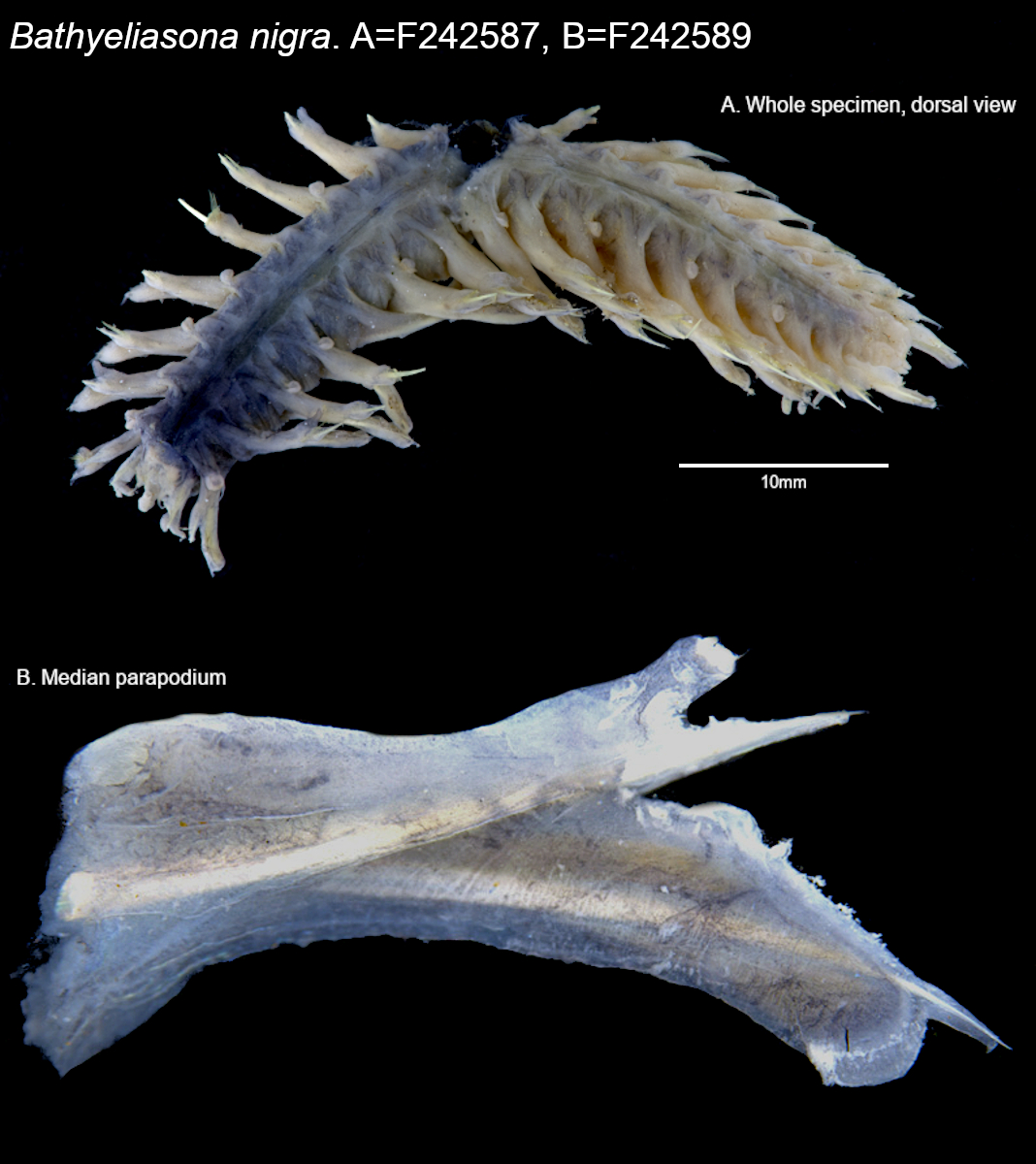

Scientific classification
- Kingdom: Animalia
- Phylum: Annelida
- Clade: Pleistoannelida
- Subclass: Errantia
- Order: Phyllodocida
- Family: Polynoidae
- Genus: Bathyeliasona; Pettibone, 1976

Type species
- Macellicephala abyssicola Fauvel, 1913

= Bathyeliasona =

Genus of annelids

Bathyeliasona is a genus of marine annelids in the family Polynoidae (scale worms). The genus includes 4 abyssal and bathyal species which occur widely in the Atlantic, Pacific and Indian oceans, from depths of 2500 to 8000 m.

== Description ==
Species belonging to Bathyeliasona have 17 or 18 segments and 8 pairs of elytra (usually missing, so typically only elytrophores are visible in preserved specimens). Lateral antennae are absent, but a pair of frontal filaments are present on the anterior margin of the prostomium. Chaetae are present on the first segment. The notochaetae are more slender than the neurochaetae and bidentate neurochaetae are absent.

== Species ==
Four species of Bathyeliasona are known as of July 2020:

- Bathyeliasona abyssicola (Fauvel, 1913)
- Bathyeliasona kirkegaardi (Uschakov, 1971)
- Bathyeliasona mariaae Bonifácio & Menot, 2018
- Bathyeliasona nigra (Hartman, 1967)
