= Hermadionella nipponicus =

Scientific classification
- Kingdom: Animalia
- Phylum: Annelida
- Clade: Pleistoannelida
- Subclass: Errantia
- Order: Phyllodocida
- Family: Polynoidae
- Genus: Hermadionella
- Species: H. nipponicus

Binomial name
- Hermadionella nipponicus (Imajima & Hartman, 1964)

Species of annelid worm

Hermadionella nipponicus is a scale worm known from Japan in the north-west Pacific Ocean from the intertidal zone.

== Description ==
Hermadionella nipponicus has up to about 64 segments with 15 pairs of elytra, which bear a fringe of papillae. The lateral antennae are positioned ventrally on the prostomium, directly beneath the median antenna (almost completely obscured in dorsal view). The prostomium also bears a pair of acute anterior projections on the anterior margin. Notochaetae are about as thick as the neurochaetae, and the neurochaetae bear bidentate tips
