= Hobsonia =

Hobsonia may refer to:

- Hobsonia (fungus), a genus of fungus in the family Phleogenaceae
- Hobsonia (annelid), a genus of worms in the family Ampharetidae
