= Capitulatinoe =

Scientific classification
- Domain: Eukaryota
- Kingdom: Animalia
- Phylum: Annelida
- Clade: Pleistoannelida
- Subclass: Errantia
- Order: Phyllodocida
- Family: Polynoidae
- Genus: Capitulatinoe; Hanley & Burke, 1989

Type species
- Capitulatinoe cupisetis Hanley & Burke, 1989

Genus of annelid worms

Capitulatinoe is a genus of marine annelids in the family Polynoidae (scale worms). The genus includes a single species, Capitulatinoe cupisetis which occurs intertidally in northwestern Australia.

== Description ==
Capitulatinoe cupisetis is a long-bodied species, with up to 180 segments and 75 to at least 100 pairs of elytra. The antennae are located beneath the prostomium and the lateral antennae are inserted slightly dorsal to the median antenna. The neuropodium is rounded. Notochaetae are absent and there are only a few neurochaetae. The neurochaetae each have a distinctive half-moon shaped pocket on one side formed by a curved row of fine teeth and bidentate tips.

== Biology and Ecology ==
Capitulatinoe cupisetis has a commensal relationship with the sea star, Astropecten granulatus.
