= Ysideria =

Scientific classification
- Domain: Eukaryota
- Kingdom: Animalia
- Phylum: Annelida
- Clade: Pleistoannelida
- Subclass: Errantia
- Order: Phyllodocida
- Family: Polynoidae
- Genus: Ysideria; Ruff, 1995
- Species: Y. hastata

Binomial name
- Ysideria hastata Ruff, 1995

Genus of annelid worms

Ysideria is a genus of marine polychaete worms belonging to the family Polynoidae, the scale worms. Ysideria contains a single species, Ysideria hastata which is known from the North Pacific Ocean off the coast of California at depths of about 50–60 m.

== Description ==
Ysideria hastata are short-bodied scale worms with 15 pairs of elytra and about 37 to 40 segments. The prostomium is bilobed anteriorly and has a pair of cephalic peaks. The styles (distal section) of the antennae are covered with slender papillae and the pair of lateral antennae are inserted ventrally directly beneath the median antenna. The neuropodium is elongate and tapering. The notochaetae are thinner than the neurochaetae and both bidentate and unidentate neurochaetae are present.
