= Polyeunoa laevis =

Scientific classification
- Kingdom: Animalia
- Phylum: Annelida
- Clade: Pleistoannelida
- Subclass: Errantia
- Order: Phyllodocida
- Family: Polynoidae
- Genus: Polyeunoa
- Species: P. laevis

Binomial name
- Polyeunoa laevis McIntosh 1885

Species of annelid worm

Polyeunoa laevis is a scale worm which is widely distributed in the Southern Ocean and occurs over a wide depth range, from 35m to 2450m.

== Description ==
Polyeunoa laevis has 75 segments, with 15 pairs of elytra. the dorsum is covered with numerous dark brown cross lines on every segment that are especially dense anteriorly. The lateral antennae inserted ventrally (beneath prostomium and median antenna). The notochaetae can be distinctly thicker than the neurochaetae, or about as thick as the neurochaetae, with bidentate neurochaetae absent.

== Taxonomic comments ==
There is significant morphological and genetic diversity from different populations across P. laevis' range and it is possible that further research will result in this taxon being divided into several species.
