= Austropolaria =

Scientific classification
- Kingdom: Animalia
- Phylum: Annelida
- Clade: Pleistoannelida
- Subclass: Errantia
- Order: Phyllodocida
- Family: Polynoidae
- Genus: Austropolaria; Neal, Barnich, Wiklund & Glover, 2012

Type species
- Austropolaria magnicirrata Neal, Barnich, Wiklund & Glover, 2012

Genus of annelid worms

Austropolaria is a genus of marine annelids in the family Polynoidae (scale worms). The genus includes a single species, Austropolaria magnicirrata, which is known only from the Amundsen Sea in the Southern Ocean, at depths of 1000 to 1500m.

== Description ==
The characters which distinguish Austropolaria from other scale worm genera in the predominantly deep sea subfamily Macellicephalinae are seven pairs of papillae on the pharynx, nine pairs of reduced elytrophores, ventral cirri inserted subdistally on the neuropodia, and a ventral keel at the posterior end.

=== Description of Austropolaria magnicirrata ===
A. magnicirrata has 20 segments and 9 pairs of elytra. The lateral antennae are absent and notochaetae are distinctly thicker than neurochaetae.

== Biology and Ecology ==
In the region of the Amundsen Sea studied, Austropolaria magnicirrata was absent from shallow (500m) stations and only occurred in the deeper basin thought to be the result of erosion by sub-glacial meltwater.
