= Brychionoe =

Scientific classification
- Kingdom: Animalia
- Phylum: Annelida
- Clade: Pleistoannelida
- Subclass: Errantia
- Order: Phyllodocida
- Family: Polynoidae
- Genus: Brychionoe; Hanley & Burke, 1991

Type species
- Brychionoe karenae Hanley & Burke, 1991

Genus of annelid worms

Brychionoe is a genus of marine annelids in the family Polynoidae (scale worms). The genus includes a single species, Brychionoe karenae, which is long-bodied and occurs in the Tasman Sea at depths of 1100–1300 m.

== Description ==
Body with 65 to 90 or more segments and 47 to 87 pairs of elytra; on the posterior-most region, the elytra occur on every segments (rather than on alternating segments, as in most Polynoidae). The tips of the notopodia and neuropodia, and the ventral cirri, all have numerous papillae. Some neurochaetae have forked tips (with 2 terminal teeth of similar size).

Although Brychionoe currently contains a single described species, an additional record of an unidentified species in this genus was reported from the Indian Ocean by Serpetti et al. (2017).

== Biology and ecology ==
Brychionoe karenae has a commensal relationship with the antipatharian coral, Leiopathes sp..
