= Verrucapelma =

Scientific classification
- Domain: Eukaryota
- Kingdom: Animalia
- Phylum: Annelida
- Clade: Pleistoannelida
- Subclass: Errantia
- Order: Phyllodocida
- Family: Polynoidae
- Genus: Verrucapelma; Hanley & Burke, 1991

Type species
- Verrucapelma nigricans (Horst, 1915)

Genus of annelid worms

Verrucapelma is a genus of marine annelids in the family Polynoidae (scale worms). Verrucapelma contains three species which are known from shallow water down to a depth of about 90 m. All three species occur in the Indo-Pacific region, in the Coral Sea, northern Australia and the Indonesian archipelago.

== Description ==
Species of Verrucapelma are short-bodied scale worms with 30 to about 39 segments and 15 pairs of elytra, the margins of which have a fringe of papillae. The prostomium is bilobed anteriorly and has a pair of cephalic peaks. The lateral antennae are located ventrally, directly beneath the median antenna and the distal part of the antennae have slender papillae. The neuropodial lobe is elongate and tapering and has two or three distinctive wart-like tubercles along the ventral edge. The notochaetae are about as thick as the neurochaetae and both are ornamented with transverse rows of small spines. The notochaetae may be unidentate, or in one species, with notched tips, while the neurochaetae are all bidentate.

== Species ==
As of September 2020, there are three species in Verrucapelma:

- Verrucapelma conifera Barnich, Sun & Fiege, 2004
- Verrucapelma nigricans (Horst, 1915)
- Verrucapelma retusa Hanley & Burke, 1991
