= Eucranta =

Scientific classification
- Kingdom: Animalia
- Phylum: Annelida
- Clade: Pleistoannelida
- Subclass: Errantia
- Order: Phyllodocida
- Family: Polynoidae
- Genus: Eucranta; Malmgren, 1865

Type species
- Eucranta villosa Malmgren, 1865

Genus of annelids

Eucranta is a genus of marine annelids in the family Polynoidae (scale worms). The genus includes 5 species which are globally distributed from depths of about 40 to 600 m, mostly from high latitudes in the northern and southern hemispheres.

== Description ==
Body short, 39 segments, 16 pairs of elytra. Anterior margin of prostomium with a pair of acute anterior peaks. Lateral antennae inserted ventrally (beneath prostomium and median antenna). Palps, antennae, dorsal and ventral cirri with papillae. Notochaetae about as thick as neurochaetae. Unidentate and bidentate neurochaetae present.

Eucranta are short-bodied scale worms with 36 to 40 segments and 15 pairs of elytra. The prostomium is bilobed anteriorly and a pair of cephalic peaks is present. The lateral antennae are located ventrally, directly beneath the median antenna ceratophore. The neuropodial lobes are elongate. The notochaetae are distinctly thicker than the neurochaetae; both are ornamented with transverse rows of small spines. The neurochaetae may be unidentate or bidentate and distinctive furcate neurochae are present.

== Species ==
The following species of Eucranta are recognised as of September 2020:

- Eucranta anoculata (Moore, 1910)
- Eucranta innatans (Chamberlin, 1919)
- Eucranta mollis (McIntosh, 1876)
- Eucranta notialis Monro, 1936
- Eucranta villosa Malmgren, 1865
