= Polyeunoa maculata =

Scientific classification
- Domain: Eukaryota
- Kingdom: Animalia
- Phylum: Annelida
- Clade: Pleistoannelida
- Subclass: Errantia
- Order: Phyllodocida
- Family: Polynoidae
- Genus: Polyeunoa
- Species: P. maculata

Binomial name
- Polyeunoa maculata (Day, 1973)

Species of annelid worm

Polyeunoa maculata is a scale worm which is only known from Ratnagiri, India

== Description ==
Polyeunoa maculata has 53 segments, with 24 pairs of elytra. The dorsum is covered with three broken dark bands per segment, with a dark streak on top of the cirrophores, the base of which are pink. The lateral antennae inserted ventrally (beneath prostomium and median antenna). The notochaetae are thinner than the neurochaetae, with bidentate neurochaetae absent.

== Biology and ecology ==
Polyeunoa maculata is commensal with another species of marine annelid, Mesochaetopterus japonicus; it was first found inside the tube constructed by M. japonicus.
