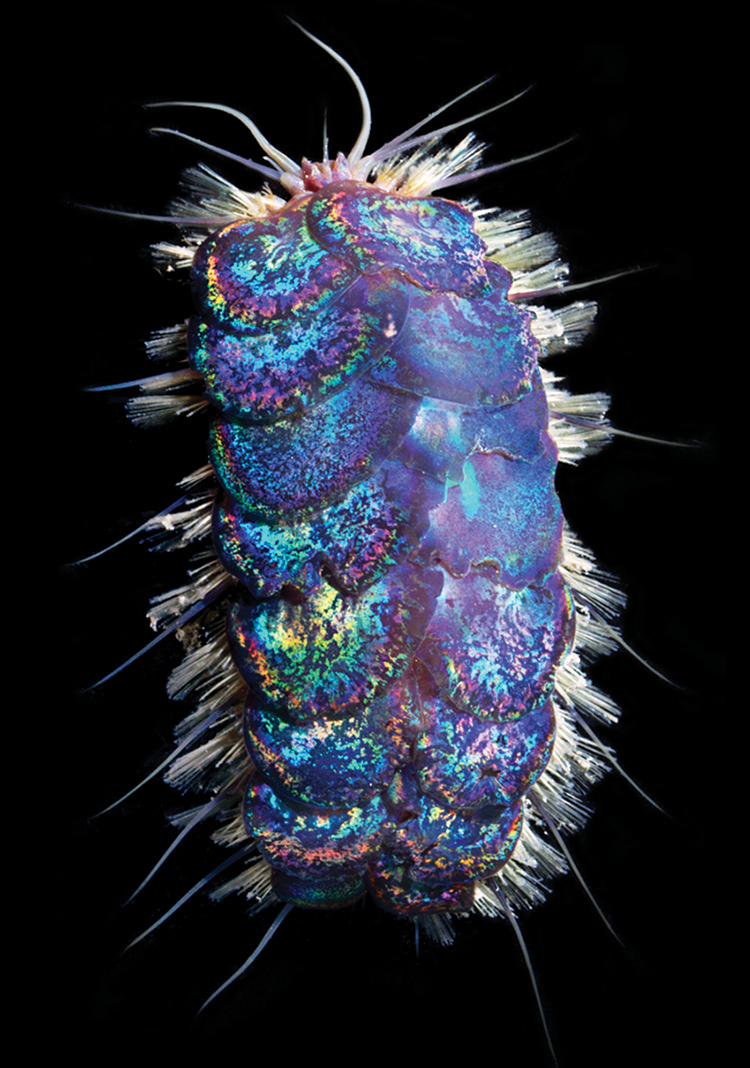

Scientific classification
- Kingdom: Animalia
- Phylum: Annelida
- Clade: Pleistoannelida
- Subclass: Errantia
- Order: Phyllodocida
- Family: Polynoidae
- Genus: Peinaleopolynoe
- Species: P. orphanae

Binomial name
- Peinaleopolynoe orphanae Hatch & Rouse, in Hatch, Liew, Hourdez & Rouse, 2020

= Peinaleopolynoe orphanae =

Species of Polynoidae discovered in 2020

Peinaleopolynoe orphanae (elvis worm) is a species of Polynoidae discovered by Hatch, Liew, Hourdez & Rouse, 2020. The specimen was discovered alongside several others of the same genus (Peinaleopolynoe). It was named for geobiologist Victoria Orphan. In 2021, the World Register of Marine Species named it as one of the ten remarkable new marine species of 2020.
