= Bathyeliasona abyssicola =

Scientific classification
- Kingdom: Animalia
- Phylum: Annelida
- Clade: Pleistoannelida
- Subclass: Errantia
- Order: Phyllodocida
- Family: Polynoidae
- Genus: Bathyeliasona
- Species: B. abyssicola

Binomial name
- Bathyeliasona abyssicola (Fauvel, 1913)

Species of annelid

Bathyeliasona abyssicola is a deep-sea scale worm which occurs widely across the Pacific and Atlantic Oceans and over a wide depth range, from 4000m to 8000m.

== Description ==
Bathyeliasona abyssicola has 18 segments, with 8 pairs of elytra and no pigmentation. The anterior margin of the prostomium comprises a pair of acute anterior projections. Lateral antennae are absent. The notochaetae are thinner than the neurochaetae, with bidentate neurochaetae absent.
