= Bathynoe =

Scientific classification
- Kingdom: Animalia
- Phylum: Annelida
- Clade: Pleistoannelida
- Subclass: Errantia
- Order: Phyllodocida
- Family: Polynoidae
- Genus: Bathynoe; Ditlevsen, 1917

Type species
- Bathynoe nodulosus Ditlevsen, 1917

Genus of annelids

Bathynoe is a genus of marine annelids in the family Polynoidae (scale worms). The genus includes 6 species, 5 of which occur in the Pacific Ocean while one occurs in the Atlantic Ocean. Bathynoe species have been recorded from depths of about 500 – 3000 m.

== Description ==
Body short, 39 segments, 16 pairs of elytra. Anterior margin of prostomium with a pair of acute anterior peaks. Lateral antennae inserted ventrally (beneath prostomium and median antenna). Palps, antennae, dorsal and ventral cirri with papillae. Notochaetae about as thick as neurochaetae. Unidentate and bidentate neurochaetae present.

Species of Bathynoe may have about 28 to 43 segments and 10–24 pairs of elytra. The elytra are large but leave the middle of dorsum uncovered, they have several large mounds and are covered with much smaller conical microtubercles. The prostomium is bilobed and cephalic peaks are absent, The median antenna is dorsal on the anteriormost part of the prostomium with the lateral antennae in a ventral position. The dorsal surface of the body has 1 to 3 tubercles on all or most segments. The neuropodia are rounded and the neurochaetae have transverse rows of very fine teeth and all have a simple unidentate tip. Notochaetae are absent.

== Species ==
Six valid species of Bathynoe are known as of September 2020:

- Bathynoe abyssicola (Imajima, 2009)
- Bathynoe cascadiensis Ruff, 1991
- Bathynoe nodulosa Ditlevsen, 1917
- Bathynoe pacifica Uschakov, 1950
- Bathynoe pustulata (Horst, 1915)
- Bathynoe tuberculata (Treadwell, 1906)
