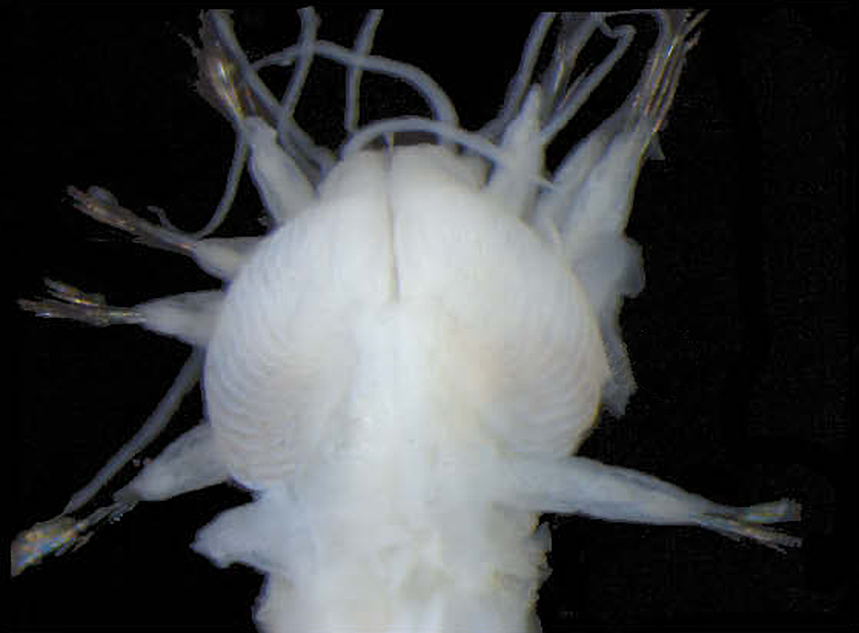
- Bruunilla nealae

Scientific classification
- Domain: Eukaryota
- Kingdom: Animalia
- Phylum: Annelida
- Clade: Pleistoannelida
- Subclass: Errantia
- Order: Phyllodocida
- Family: Polynoidae
- Genus: Bruunilla
- Species: B. nealae

Binomial name
- Bruunilla nealae Bonifácio & Menot, 2018

= Bruunilla nealae =

Species of annelid worm

Bruunilla nealae is a deep-sea scale worm that is known from a single specimen collected from the Clarion-Clipperton fracture zone in the Pacific Ocean from a depth of about 5000 m.

== Description ==
Bruunilla nealae is a short-bodied worm with up to about 18 segments and 8 pairs of elytra. It is pale white and slightly translucent in life, but a pale yellow when preserved in ethanol. The species lacks lateral antennae and the notochaetae are thinner than the neurochaetae.
