= Benhamipolynoe =

Scientific classification
- Kingdom: Animalia
- Phylum: Annelida
- Clade: Pleistoannelida
- Subclass: Errantia
- Order: Phyllodocida
- Family: Polynoidae
- Genus: Benhamipolynoe; Pettibone, 1970

Type species
- Lepidasthenia antipathicola Benham, 1927

Genus of annelids

Benhamipolynoe is a genus of marine annelids in the family Polynoidae (scale worms). The genus is known from the Pacific and Atlantic Oceans and includes 2 species.

== Description ==
Species of Benhamipolynoe are long-bodied scale worms comprising 50–200 or more segments and 10–50 or more pairs of elytra; the elytra are large but leave the middle part of the body uncovered. The lateral antennae are inserted terminally on the anterior margin of the prostomium. The neurochaetae are smooth or almost so, lacking prominent ornamentation; bidentate neurochaetae are absent.

== Biology and ecology ==
Both species of Benhamipolynoe currently known are commensal with corals.

== Species ==
Two species of Benhamipolynoe are known as of August 2020:

- Benhamipolynoe antipathicola (Benham 1927)
- Benhamipolynoe cairnsi Pettibone 1989
