= Australaugeneria rutilans =

Scientific classification
- Kingdom: Animalia
- Phylum: Annelida
- Clade: Pleistoannelida
- Subclass: Errantia
- Order: Phyllodocida
- Family: Polynoidae
- Genus: Australaugeneria
- Species: A. rutilans

Binomial name
- Australaugeneria rutilans (Grube, 1878)

Species of annelid worm

Australaugeneria rutilans is a scale worm known from northern Australia, south-east Asia and the Persian Gulf, from depths of 28m or less.

== Description ==
Number of segments 40; elytra 15 pairs. Clear, white no pigments other than black eyes. Lateral antennae inserted ventrally (beneath prostomium and median antenna). Notochaetae about as thick as neurochaetae. Bidentate neurochaetae absent.

== Commensalism ==
Australaugeneria rutilans is commensal. Its host taxa are alcyonacean corals.
