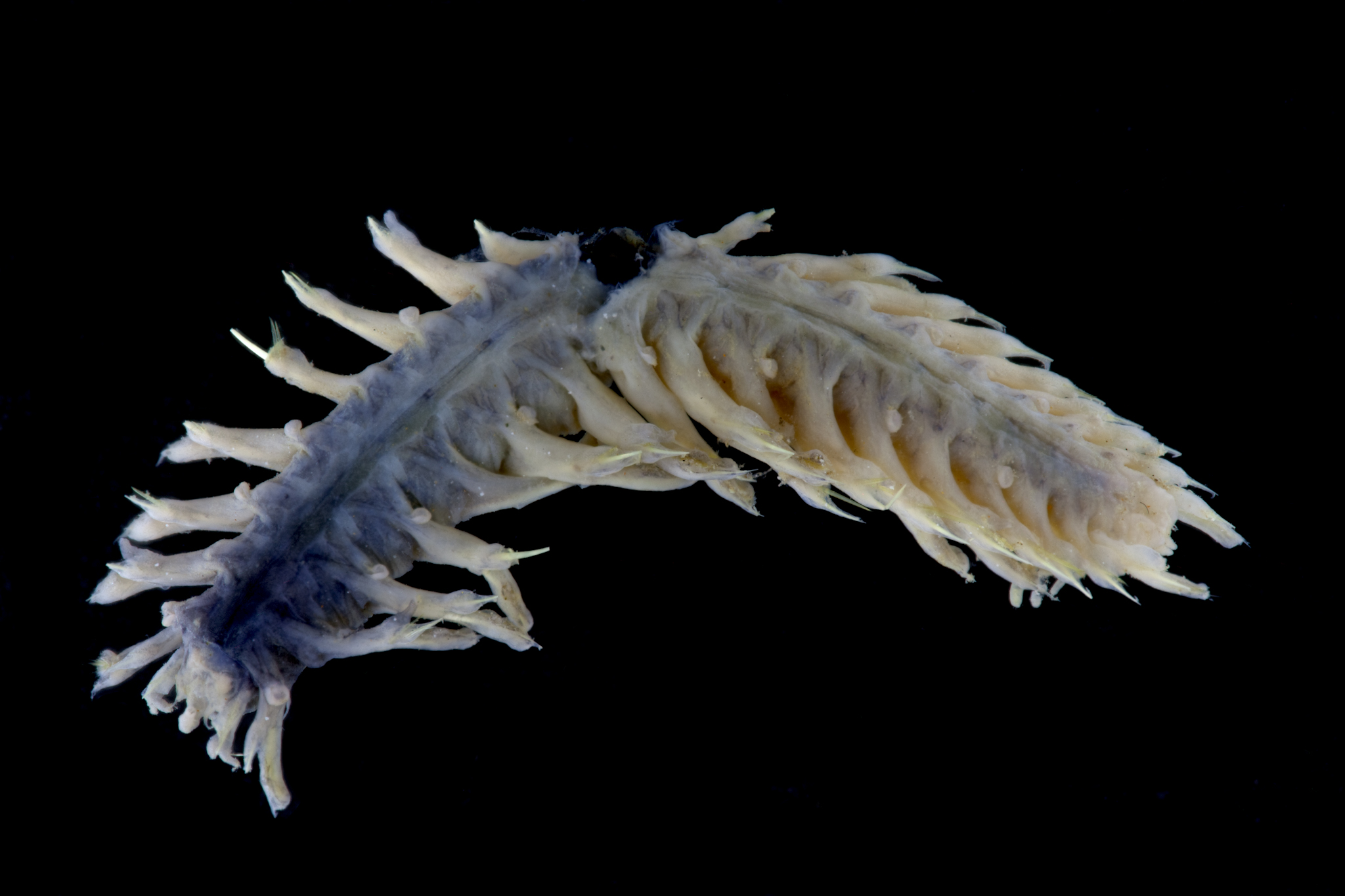
- Bathyeliasona nigra specimen in dorsal view from Museums Victoria.

Scientific classification
- Kingdom: Animalia
- Phylum: Annelida
- Clade: Pleistoannelida
- Subclass: Errantia
- Order: Phyllodocida
- Family: Polynoidae
- Genus: Bathyeliasona
- Species: B. nigra

Binomial name
- Bathyeliasona nigra (Hartman, 1967)

= Bathyeliasona nigra =

Species of annelid

Bathyeliasona nigra is a deep-sea scale worm which occurs widely in the Indian, Pacific and Atlantic Oceans from a depth range of about 2,500-5,000m.

== Description ==
Bathyeliasona nigra has 18 segments and 8 pairs of elytra, with slaty-black pigmentation. The anterior margin of the prostomium comprises a pair of acute anterior projections and the lateral antennae are absent. The notochaetae are about as thick as the neurochaetae and bidentate neurochaetae are absent.
