= Bathybahamas =

Scientific classification
- Kingdom: Animalia
- Phylum: Annelida
- Clade: Pleistoannelida
- Subclass: Errantia
- Order: Phyllodocida
- Family: Polynoidae
- Genus: Bathybahamas; Pettibone, 1985

Type species
- Bathybahamas charlenae Pettibone, 1985

Genus of annelid worms

Bathybahamas is a genus of marine annelids in the family Polynoidae (scale worms). The genus includes a single species, Bathybahamas charleneae, which is short-bodied and occurs in the North Atlantic Ocean off the Bahamas at a depths of 2066 m.

== Description ==
Body very short, only 18 segments and 8 pairs of elytra. The anterior third of the body is brown, as is the lining of the pharynx. The median antenna is located dorsally on the prostomium and lateral antennae are absent. The notochaetae are distinctly thicker than the neurochaetae and bidentate neurochaetae are absent.
