= Austrolaenilla =

Scientific classification
- Domain: Eukaryota
- Kingdom: Animalia
- Phylum: Annelida
- Clade: Pleistoannelida
- Subclass: Errantia
- Order: Phyllodocida
- Family: Polynoidae
- Genus: Austrolaenilla; Bergström, 1916

Type species
- Austrolaenilla antarctica Bergström, 1916

Genus of annelids

Austrolaenilla is a genus of marine annelids in the family Polynoidae (scale worms). The genus includes 10 species which are known from depths of about 20 m to over 5000 m and from the Atlantic Ocean, Southern Ocean and Antarctic Ocean.

== Description ==
Austrolaenilla are short bodied species with fewer than 50 segments and 15 or 16 pairs of elytra. The median and lateral antennae are covered with slender papillae and are located ventral to the anterior margin of the prostomium; lateral antennae are ventrally (directly beneath the median antenna). Chaetae are present on the first segment. The neuropodial lobe is elongate and tapering. The notochaetae are stout, distinctly thicker than neurochaetae and are ornamented with transverse rows of fine teeth. The neurochaetae are distinctive, with hairy tips and may be either unidentate or bidentate.

== Species ==
The following species of Austrolaenilla are recognised as of September 2020:

- Austrolaenilla abyssicola (Uschakov, 1962)
- Austrolaenilla antarctica Bergström, 1916
- Austrolaenilla bidentata Averincev, 1978
- Austrolaenilla fulgens (Pruvot in Fauvel, 1936)
- Austrolaenilla hastulifera (Pruvot in Fauvel, 1936)
- Austrolaenilla lanellae Pettibone, 1955
- Austrolaenilla meteorae (Hartmann-Schröder, 1982)
- Austrolaenilla mollis (Sars, 1872)
- Austrolaenilla pelagica (Monro, 1930)
- Austrolaenilla setobarba (Monro, 1930)
