= Hermadionella chayvoensis =

Scientific classification
- Kingdom: Animalia
- Phylum: Annelida
- Clade: Pleistoannelida
- Subclass: Errantia
- Order: Phyllodocida
- Family: Polynoidae
- Genus: Hermadionella
- Species: H. chayvoensis

Binomial name
- Hermadionella chayvoensis Alalykina, 2011

Species of annelid worm

Hermadionella chayvoensis is a scale worm known from the Sea of Okhotsk in the north-west Pacific Ocean from depths of about 50 m (160 ft).

== Description ==
Hermadionella chayvoensis is a short-bodied scale worm with 50–54 segments and 15 pairs of elytra. Lateral antennae are positioned ventrally on the prostomium (directly beneath median antenna ceratophore and almost obscured in dorsal view. The notochaetae are distinctly thicker than the neurochaetae and neurochaetae with bidentate tips are absent.
