= Bylgides =

Scientific classification
- Domain: Eukaryota
- Kingdom: Animalia
- Phylum: Annelida
- Clade: Pleistoannelida
- Subclass: Errantia
- Order: Phyllodocida
- Family: Polynoidae
- Genus: Bylgides; Chamberlin, 1919

Type species
- Bylgia elegans Théel, 1879

Synonyms
- Bylgia Théel, 1879 – preoccupied by Bylgia Münster, 1839

Genus of annelids

Bylgides is a genus of marine annelids in the family Polynoidae (scale worms). The genus contains nine species, all found in the Northern Hemisphere and from shallow inshore waters to depths of about 5000 m.

== Description ==
Body short, 39 segments, 16 pairs of elytra. Anterior margin of prostomium with a pair of acute anterior peaks. Lateral antennae inserted ventrally (beneath prostomium and median antenna). Palps, antennae, dorsal and ventral cirri with papillae. Notochaetae about as thick as neurochaetae. Unidentate and bidentate neurochaetae present.

Species of Bylgides are short-bodied scale worms, with 34 to 39 segments and 14 or 15 pairs of elytra; the elytra have a marginal fringe of short papillae. The prostomium is rounded and bilobed anteriorly, with a pair of cephalic peaks. The antennae are covered with slender papillae and are located ventral to the prostomium; the pair of lateral antennae are inserted ventral (directly beneath) the median antenna. The neuropodium is elongate, tapering. The notochaetae are distinctly thicker than the neurochaetae. All or most neurochaetae have long tapering capillary tips, bidentate neurochaetae are absent.

== Species ==
A following species of Bylgides are known as of April 2025:

- Bylgides acutisetis Loshamn, 1981
- Bylgides annenkovae Pettibone, 1993
- Bylgides belfastensis Pettibone, 1993
- Bylgides elegans (Théel, 1879)
- Bylgides fuscus (Hartman & Fauchald, 1971)
- Bylgides groenlandicus (Malmgren, 1867)
- Bylgides macrolepidus (Moore, 1905)
- Bylgides promamme (Malmgren, 1867)
- Bylgides sarsi (Kinberg in Malmgren, 1866)
