= Pareulagisca =

Scientific classification
- Kingdom: Animalia
- Phylum: Annelida
- Clade: Pleistoannelida
- Subclass: Errantia
- Order: Phyllodocida
- Family: Polynoidae
- Genus: Pareulagisca; Pettibone, 1997

Type species
- Pareulagisca panamensis (Hartman, 1939)

Genus of annelid worms

Pareulagisca is a genus of marine annelids in the family Polynoidae (scale worms). The genus contains a single species, Pareulagisca panamensis, known from a single specimen, collected intertidally in Panama in the Pacific Ocean.

== Description ==
Pareulagisca is characterised by having 16 pairs of elytra and about 37 segments. The lateral antennae are undivided and inserted terminally on the prostomium. There is a distinctive dorsal fold ("nuchal flap" in the taxonomic literature) on segment 2. Unlike the related genus Eulagisca, Pareulagisca has long slender notochaetae with fine tapering tips in addition to stout notochaetae with blunt tips.
