= Hermadion =

Scientific classification
- Kingdom: Animalia
- Phylum: Annelida
- Clade: Pleistoannelida
- Subclass: Errantia
- Order: Phyllodocida
- Family: Polynoidae
- Genus: Hermadion; Kinberg, 1856
- Species: H. magalhaensi

Binomial name
- Hermadion magalhaensi Kinberg, 1856

Genus of annelid worms

Hermadion is a genus of marine polychaete worms belonging to the family Polynoidae, the scaleworms. Hermadion contains a single species, Hermadion magalhaensi which is known from the South Atlantic, South Pacific and southern Indian Oceans at depths to about 110 m.

== Description ==
Hermadion magalhaensi is a short-bodied scale worm with fewer than 50 segments and 15 pairs of elytra. The elytra are large but leave a small median part of the body uncovered. The prostomium is bilobed and rounded anteriorly, lacking acute cephalic peaks. The antennal styles have slender papillae and the lateral antennae are inserted ventrally, beneath the median antenna. The neuropodial lobe is elongate and tapering to a narrow tip. The notochaetae have pointed tips and are distinctly thicker than the neurochaetae. The neurochaetae are simple and none have bidentate tips.
