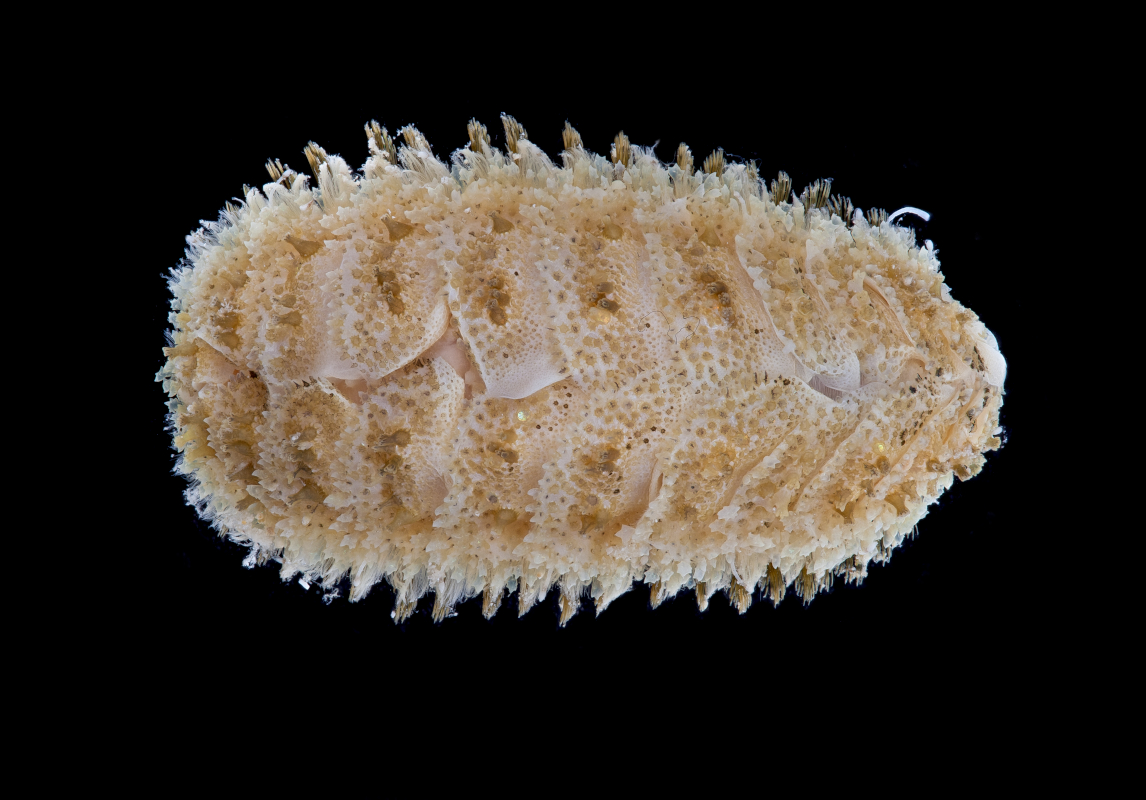

Scientific classification
- Kingdom: Animalia
- Phylum: Annelida
- Clade: Pleistoannelida
- Subclass: Errantia
- Order: Phyllodocida
- Family: Polynoidae
- Genus: Euphione; McIntosh, 1885

= Euphione =

Genus of annelid worms

Euphione is a genus of polychaetes belonging to the family Polynoidae.

The species of this genus are found in Australia, Malesia and southern Africa.

Species:

- Euphione branchifera (Moore, 1903)
- Euphione chitoniformis (Moore, 1903)
- Euphione elisabethae McIntosh, 1885
- Euphione ornata Knox, 1960
- Euphione squamosa (Quatrefages, 1866)
- Euphione suluensis (Horst, 1917)
