= Bruunilla =

Scientific classification
- Kingdom: Animalia
- Phylum: Annelida
- Clade: Pleistoannelida
- Subclass: Errantia
- Order: Phyllodocida
- Family: Polynoidae
- Genus: Bruunilla; Hartman, 1971

Type species
- Bruunilla natalensis Hartman, 1971

Genus of annelids

Bathynoe is a genus of marine annelids in the family Polynoidae (scale worms). The genus includes two species, both known from depths of about 5000 m.

== Description ==
Bruunilla are short-bodied with 18 segments and 8 pairs of fragile translucent elytra. The median antenna style is smooth, and lateral antennae and frontal filaments may be present or absent. Ventrum with a pair of tapering wing-like structures projecting laterally. Notochaetae are few, distally flattened to concave, and serrated on both margins. Neurochaetae are more stout and more numerous than notochaetae, distally flattened to concave, and serrated on both margins.

Species of Bruunilla are readily distinguished by having a pair of conspicuous tapering wing-like structures projecting laterally from the ventrum of segments 1–3 (the lower lip of the mouth).

== Species ==
Two valid species of Bruunilla are known as of November 2020:

- Bruunilla natalensis Hartman, 1971
- Bruunilla nealae Bonifácio & Menot, 2018
