= Bathynotalia =

Scientific classification
- Domain: Eukaryota
- Kingdom: Animalia
- Phylum: Annelida
- Clade: Pleistoannelida
- Subclass: Errantia
- Order: Phyllodocida
- Family: Polynoidae
- Genus: Bathynotalia; Levenstein, 1982

Type species
- Bathynotalia perplexa Levenstein, 1982

Genus of annelids

Bathynotalia is a genus of marine annelids in the family Polynoidae (scale worms). The only species, Bathynotalia perplexa, is known from a single specimen collected at 4395m in the Tasman Sea south of Tasmania, Australia.

== Description ==
In Bathynotalia there are 21 segments and 11 pairs of elytra. The lateral antennae are inserted ventrally on the anterior margin of prostomium. The notochaetae are about as thick as neurochaetae and bidentate neurochaetae are absent.

No other genus of Polynoidae has ventral lateral antennae and only 11 pairs of elytra. Levenstein's figure of Bathynotalia also shows about 22 pairs of terminal papillae on the pharynx, which if verified is many more than for any other Polynoidae.
