= Australonoe =

Australonoe willani

Scientific classification
- Domain: Eukaryota
- Kingdom: Animalia
- Phylum: Annelida
- Clade: Pleistoannelida
- Subclass: Errantia
- Order: Phyllodocida
- Family: Polynoidae
- Genus: Australonoe; Hanley, 1993

Type species
- Australonoe willani Hanley, 1993

Genus of annelids

Australonoe willani is a species of marine annelids in the family Polynoidae (scale worms), and the sole member of the genus Australonoe, known only from the south-east Indian Ocean at Rottnest Island, Western Australia.

== Description ==
The body is short, with 39 segments bearing 16 pairs of elytra. The anterior margin of the prostomium has a pair of acute anterior peaks. The lateral antennae are inserted ventrally (beneath prostomium and median antenna). Palps, antennae, dorsal and ventral cirri bear papillae. The notochaetae are about as thick as the neurochaetae. Unidentate (lacking a secondary tooth at the tips) and bidentate neurochaetae present. In life, the species has a reddish prostomium with the rest of body and elytra orange.
