= Robertianella =

Scientific classification
- Kingdom: Animalia
- Phylum: Annelida
- Clade: Pleistoannelida
- Subclass: Errantia
- Order: Phyllodocida
- Family: Polynoidae
- Genus: Robertianella; McIntosh, 1885

Type species
- Polynoe synophthalma McIntosh, 1885

Genus of annelids

Robertianella is a genus of marine annelids in the family Polynoidae (scale worms). There are 2 species of Robertianella which are known from depths of about 600 to 3000 m in the north-east Atlantic Ocean and the Mediterranean Sea.

== Description ==
Robertianella are short-bodied scale worms with 33 to about 43 segments and 15 pairs of elytra. The prostomium is bilobed anteriorly and each lobe has a small prominence ("cephalic peak") on the anterior margin. The lateral antennae are located ventrally, directly beneath median antenna ceratophore. The neuropodia are elongate and tapering. The notochaetae are about as thick as the neurochaetae and both are ornamented with transverse rows of small spines. The neurochaetae are distinctive, with minutely notched tips.

== Species ==
Two species of Robertianella are recognised as valid as of September 2020:

- Robertianella platychaeta Detinova, 1985
- Robertianella synophthalma McIntosh, 1885
