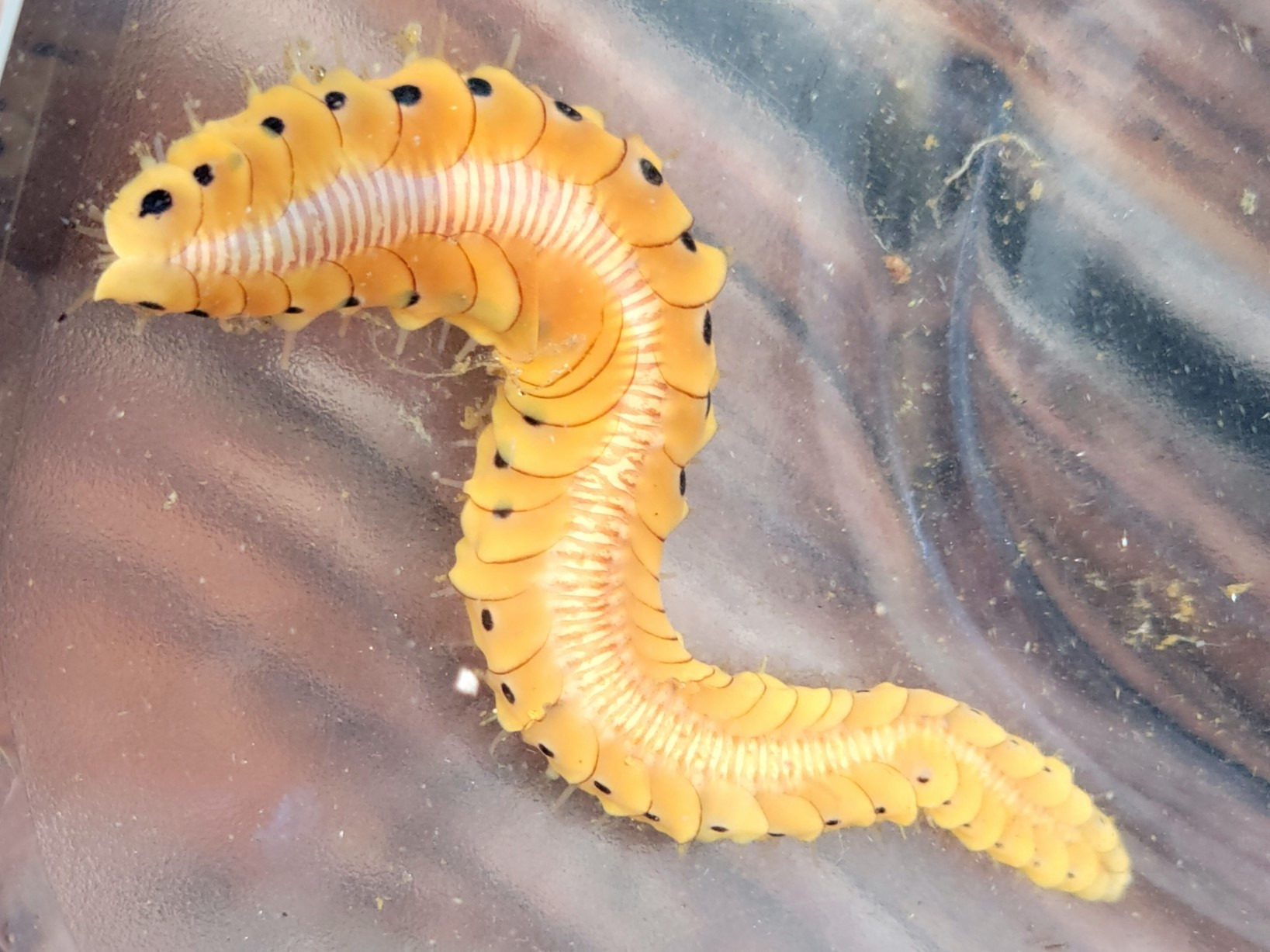
- Arctonoe pulchra

Scientific classification
- Kingdom: Animalia
- Phylum: Annelida
- Clade: Pleistoannelida
- Subclass: Errantia
- Order: Phyllodocida
- Family: Polynoidae
- Genus: Arctonoe; Chamberlin, 1920

Type species
- Arctonoe lia Chamberlin, 1920

= Arctonoe =

Genus of annelids

Arctonoe is a genus of worms in the family Polynoidae. They are commonly known as "scale worms". Members of this genus predominantly occur in shallow (50 metres or less) waters of the north-eastern Pacific Ocean and often live as commensals of other marine invertebrates, frequently echinoderms but sometimes molluscs or other polychaetes.

== Description ==
Arctonoe have long bodies, with 100 or more segments and numerous pairs of smooth translucent scales (elytra) on several of the segments. The first segment (prostomium), which contains the mouth, is rounded and smooth; on its side it has antennae pointing away from the body. Parapodia are found along the body with both dorsal (notopodial) and ventral (neuropodial) acicula penetrating epidermis. The notochaetae are few in number and more slender than the neurochaetae both notochaetae and neurochaetae have minutely notched tips (see Hanley, 1989 for detailed diagnosis).

== Species ==
The following species are recognised in the genus Arctonoe:

- Arctonoe fragilis (Baird, 1863)
- Arctonoe pulchra (Johnson, 1897)
- Arctonoe vittata (Grube, 1855)
