= Nonparahalosydna =

Scientific classification
- Kingdom: Animalia
- Phylum: Annelida
- Clade: Pleistoannelida
- Subclass: Errantia
- Order: Phyllodocida
- Family: Polynoidae
- Genus: Nonparahalosydna; Uschakov, 1982

Genus of annelid worms

Nonparahalosydna is a genus of polychaetes belonging to the family Polynoidae.

Species:

- Nonparahalosydna pleiolepis (Marenzeller, 1879)
