= Bruunilla natalensis =

Scientific classification
- Kingdom: Animalia
- Phylum: Annelida
- Clade: Pleistoannelida
- Subclass: Errantia
- Order: Phyllodocida
- Family: Polynoidae
- Genus: Bruunilla
- Species: B. natalensis

Binomial name
- Bruunilla natalensis Hartman, 1971

Species of annelid worm

Bruunilla natalensis is a deep-sea scale worm that is known from a single specimen collected from the Mozambique Basin in the Indian Ocean from a depth of about 5000 m.

== Description ==
Bruunilla natalensis is a short-bodied worm with up to about 18 segments and 8 pairs of elytra. It is grey without patterns and lacks lateral antennae.
