= Bathytasmania =

Scientific classification
- Domain: Eukaryota
- Kingdom: Animalia
- Phylum: Annelida
- Clade: Pleistoannelida
- Subclass: Errantia
- Order: Phyllodocida
- Family: Polynoidae
- Genus: Bathytasmania; Levenstein, 1982

Type species
- Bathytasmania insolita Levenstein, 1982

Genus of annelids

Bathytasmania is a genus of marine annelids in the family Polynoidae (scale worms). The only species, Bathytasmania insolita, is known from a single specimen collected at 4395m in the Tasman Sea south of Tasmania, Australia.

== Description ==
Bathytasmania has 19 segments and 10 pairs of elytra. A median antenna is present but lateral antennae are absent. Bidentate neurochaetae are absent and The first segment lacks chaetae.
