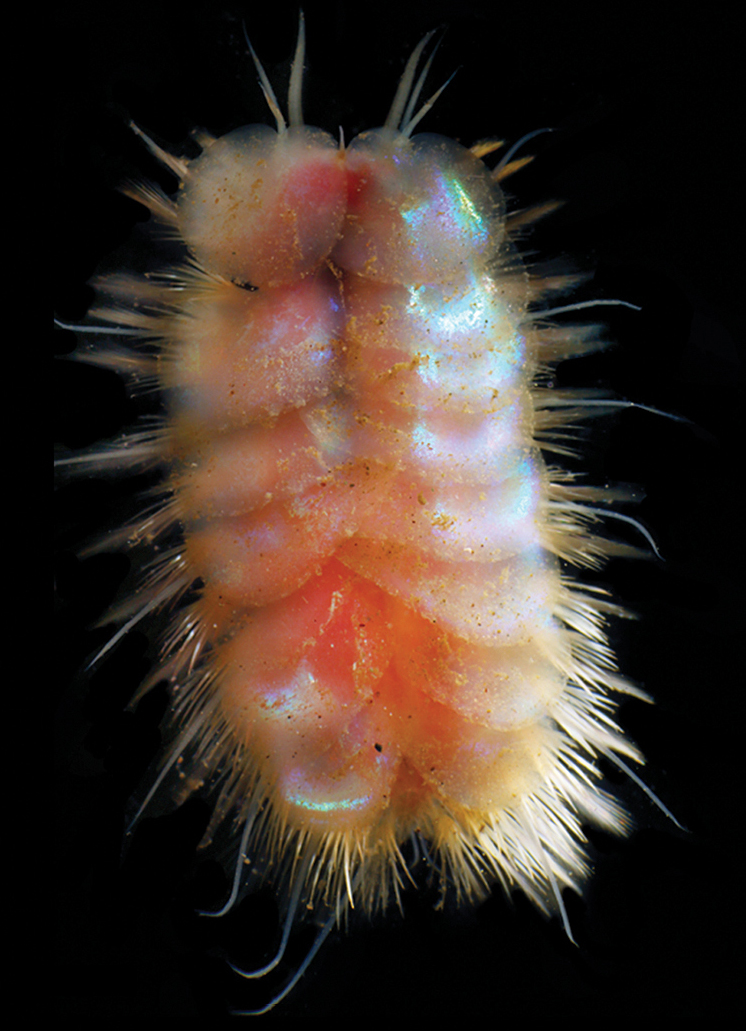
- Peinaleopolynoe mineoi

Scientific classification
- Kingdom: Animalia
- Phylum: Annelida
- Clade: Pleistoannelida
- Subclass: Errantia
- Order: Phyllodocida
- Family: Polynoidae
- Genus: Peinaleopolynoe; Desbruyères & Laubier, 1988

Type species
- Peinaleopolynoe sillardi Desbruyères & Laubier, 1988

= Peinaleopolynoe =

Genus of annelid worms

Peinaleopolynoe, also known as hungry scale worms and Elvis worms, is a genus of bristle worm belonging to the family Polynoidae (scale worms). There are six known species, four of which were described in 2020. Members of this genus generally live in nutrient-rich environments in the deep sea, such as at whale falls.

== Etymology ==
The name Peinaleopolynoe comes from the Greek word peinaleos (πειναλεoσ), meaning "hungry" or "famished", in reference to the attraction of the worms to food fall.

== Description ==
Peinaleoppolynoe species are short-segmented scale worms with 21 segments. They are covered in large, overlapping, kidney-shaped plates (elytra). The bristles (chaetae) on both sides can be seen from above, as they are not covered by the plates. They do not have any eyes.

== Species ==
The genus contains 6 recognized species:

- Peinaleopolynoe sillardi Desbruyères & Laubier, 1988
- Peinaleopolynoe santacatalina Pettibone, 1993
- Peinaleopolynoe orphanae Hatch & Rouse, 2020
- Peinaleopolynoe elvisi Hatch & Rouse, 2020
- Peinaleopolynoe goffrediae Hatch & Rouse, 2020
- Peinaleopolynoe mineoi Hatch & Rouse, 2020

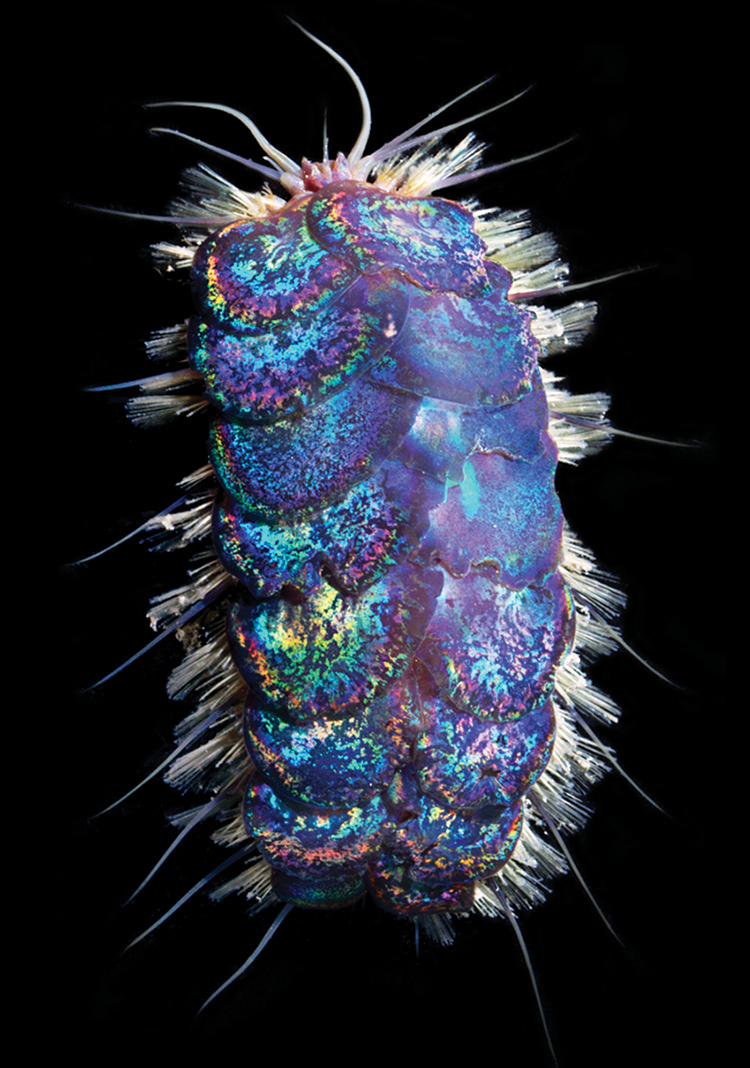
Peinaleopolynoe orphanae

== Habitat ==
Peinaleoppolynoe species live in the deep ocean at depths between 850 to 4000 meters below the surface. They are found in nutrient-rich places such as hydrothermal vents, methane seeps, and whale falls. They have been collected from a range of sites in both the Atlantic and Pacific Oceans.

== Behavior ==
An unusual behavior observed in Peinaleopolynoe is aggressive fighting. Observations show that individual worms sometimes bite chunks off each other’s scales. The fights can last several minutes, with both worms attacking and biting back and forth. This behavior explains why many specimens have damaged or chipped scales. Scientists do not yet know why the worms fight, but this most likely relates to competition or territorial disputes.

Peinaleopolynoe species are thought to use their jaws to scrape bacteria off rocks and decaying organic matter.
