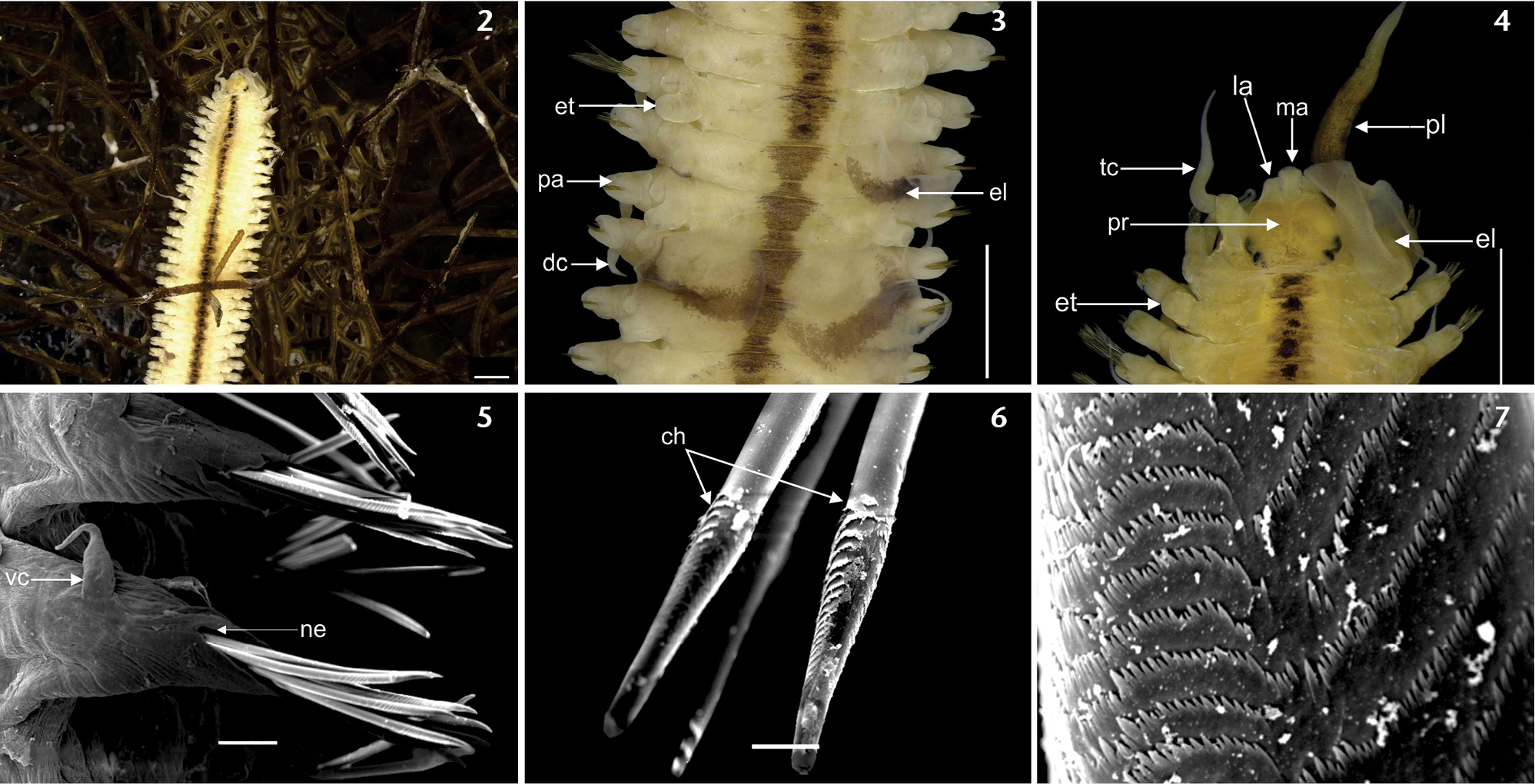

Scientific classification
- Kingdom: Animalia
- Phylum: Annelida
- Clade: Pleistoannelida
- Subclass: Errantia
- Order: Phyllodocida
- Family: Polynoidae
- Genus: Benhamipolynoe
- Species: B. antipathicola

Binomial name
- Benhamipolynoe antipathicola (Benham 1927)

= Benhamipolynoe antipathicola =

Species of annelid worm

Benhamipolynoe antipathicola is a deep-sea scale worm that has been reported from the Pacific and Atlantic Oceans from depths of 128 to almost 500m.

== Description ==
Benhamipolynoe antipathicola has 200 or more segments and numerous elytra (17 to 50 or more pairs) and distinctive brown pigmentation along the dorsal midline, and as transverse bands across every segment in the posterior half of the body.

== Biology and ecology ==
Benhamipolynoe antipathicola has a commensal relationship with species of antipatharian corals, namely Parantipathes tenuispina and Antipathes columnaris.
