= Polyeunoa =

Scientific classification
- Kingdom: Animalia
- Phylum: Annelida
- Clade: Pleistoannelida
- Subclass: Errantia
- Order: Phyllodocida
- Family: Polynoidae
- Genus: Polyeunoa; McIntosh, 1885

Type species
- Polyeunoa laevis McIntosh, 1885

Genus of annelid worms

Polyeunoa is a genus of marine annelids in the family Polynoidae (scale worms). The genus contains two species, one from the Indian Ocean and the other widespread in the south-west Atlantic ocean and the Southern Ocean.

== Description ==
Species of Polyeunoa are long-bodied with 70 or more segments and at least 15 pairs of elytra. The elytra leave part of the mid-dorsal body and most posterior segments uncovered. Cephalic peaks are absent or very small on the prostomium and the lateral antennae are inserted beneath the median antenna. The notochaetae are few and about as thick as the neurochaetae, which are numerous. Both unidentate and bidentate forms of chaetae are present.

== Species ==
The following species of Polyeunoa are recognised as of September 2020:

- Polyeunoa laevis McIntosh, 1885
- Polyeunoa maculata (Day, 1973)
