= Karl Banse =

German-born American oceanographer (1920–2025)

Karl A. Banse, (February 20, 1929 – February 8, 2025) was an American oceanographer, marine biologist, and professor emeritus at the University of Washington. He obtained his Ph.D. in oceanography at the University of Kiel in 1955. In 1960 he became an assistant professor at the University of Washington, Seattle, and a full professor in 1966. He was a visiting professor at Scripps Inst. of Oceanography, Univ. of California, 1972–1973, and at Skidaway Inst. of Oceanography, University System of Georgia, 1980–1981. In 1985, he got the Summer Faculty Fellowship of NASA-ASEE at the NASA-Goddard Space Flight Center, and in 1989 was a Fellow at India's Marine Biological Association.

== Scientific focus ==
Banse was an expert in plankton production and hydrography, with a focus on the Arabian Sea. He has studied how plankton interact with light, temperature and nutrients, and contributed to the understanding of how plankton is controlled by bottom-up and top down mechanisms.

Banse wrote an introductory article for the Indian Annual Review of Marine Science.

== Awards ==
Banse received the Lifetime Achievement Award "for his prolific, diverse, and seminal papers on key oceanographic issues, rigorous application of the scientific method, high intellectual standards, and excellence in teaching," from the American Society for Limnology and Oceanography in 1998.
