= Pettibonesia =

Scientific classification
- Domain: Eukaryota
- Kingdom: Animalia
- Phylum: Annelida
- Clade: Pleistoannelida
- Subclass: Errantia
- Order: Phyllodocida
- Family: Polynoidae
- Genus: Pettibonesia; Nemésio, 2006

Synonyms
- Wilsoniella Pettibone, 1993

Genus of annelid worms

Pettibonesia is a genus of annelids belonging to the family Polynoidae.

The species of this genus are found in Northern Europe.

Species:

- Pettibonesia furcosetosa (Loshamn, 1981)
