= Chaetacanthus (annelid) =

Scientific classification
- Kingdom: Animalia
- Phylum: Annelida
- Clade: Pleistoannelida
- Subclass: Errantia
- Order: Phyllodocida
- Family: Polynoidae
- Genus: Chaetacanthus; Seidler, 1922

Genus of annelids

Chaetacanthus is a genus of polychaetes belonging to the family Polynoidae.

The species of this genus are found in America.

Species:

- Chaetacanthus barbatus (Augener, 1910)
- Chaetacanthus brasiliensis de Quatrefages, 1866
- Chaetacanthus harrisae Salazar-Silva, López-Sánchez & Salazar-Vallejo, 2020
- Chaetacanthus magnificus (Grube, 1876)
- Chaetacanthus ornatus Salazar-Silva, López-Sánchez & Salazar-Vallejo, 2020
- Chaetacanthus pilosus (Treadwell, 1937)
- Chaetacanthus pomareae (Kinberg, 1856)
