= Acicula =

Anatomical feature of annelids

Acicula (sing.: aciculum) are strong, stout internal chaetae that provide support to parapodia in polychaete annelids.

Microscope photograph of a parapodium from a specimen of Arctonoe sp. showing the internal acicula that support the two lobes of the parapodium.
