= Marian H. Pettibone =

Marilyn "Marian" H. Pettibone
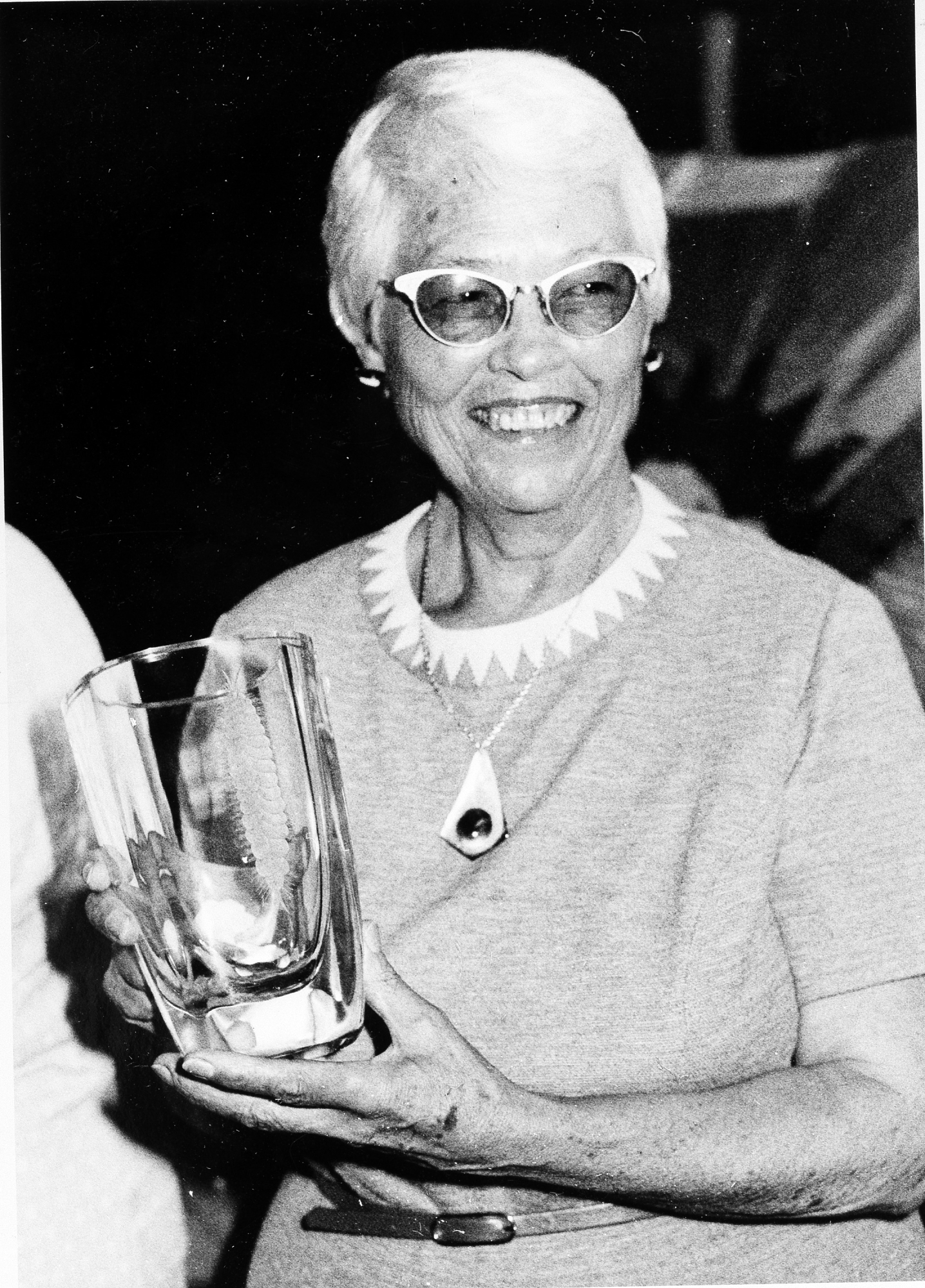
- Born: July 8, 1908; Spokane, Washington, United States
- Died: December 18, 2003 (aged 95)
- Education: Linfield College; University of Oregon; University of Washington
- Scientific career
- Fields: Invertebrate zoology (polychaete)
- Workplaces: Johns Hopkins University; University of New Hampshire; National Museum of Natural History

Marilyn "Marian" Hope Pettibone (1908–2003) was a curator at the Smithsonian's National Museum of Natural History invertebrate zoology department. She was known for her work on worms, specializing in polychaetes. She was the world authority on polynoidae during her career.

== Life and career ==
Pettibone studied at Linfield College and received her BS in 1930. In 1932 she received her MS from the University of Oregon, and in 1947 her PhD from the University of Washington.

Pettibone began in 1930 as a research and laboratory assistant at the University of Oregon until 1933. She then became a biology instructor at St. Helen's Hall Junior College in Portland, Oregon, from 1935 to 1942, and at the University of Washington, Seattle in 1945 to 1949. In 1949 she moved to Washington, D.C. and became a research associate at the Johns Hopkins University and the Office of Naval Research. Then in 1953 she became an Associate Professor of zoology at the University of New Hampshire until she moved back to Washington, D.C., in 1963 to work at the Smithsonian's National Museum of Natural History as the Curator of Polychaetes.

Pettibone retired in 1978 because of the federal age mandatory retirement rules, but was still active in her field as a Curator Emerita until a few years before her death. She has 33 species and 3 genera named after her.

== World War II ==
During WW2 Pettibone worked in a shipyard for the war effort. As she was in line for her interview she overheard that the men that were in the other line to sign up for welding jobs were going to be paid much more than the women applying for secretarial work. She switched lines and became a welder. She was a quality control manager in her welding section before the war ended.

== Publications ==
While at the University of New Hampshire Pettibone wrote part 1 of her work called "Marine Polychaete Worms of the New England Region", which was published in 1963. It was so popular it was re-printed twenty years later, in 1983. During her career she published 84 papers, most of which were single-authored. She authored 77 genera and 172 species. 73 genera and 147 species remain valid today.
