= Parapodium =

Protusions from the body in invertebrates

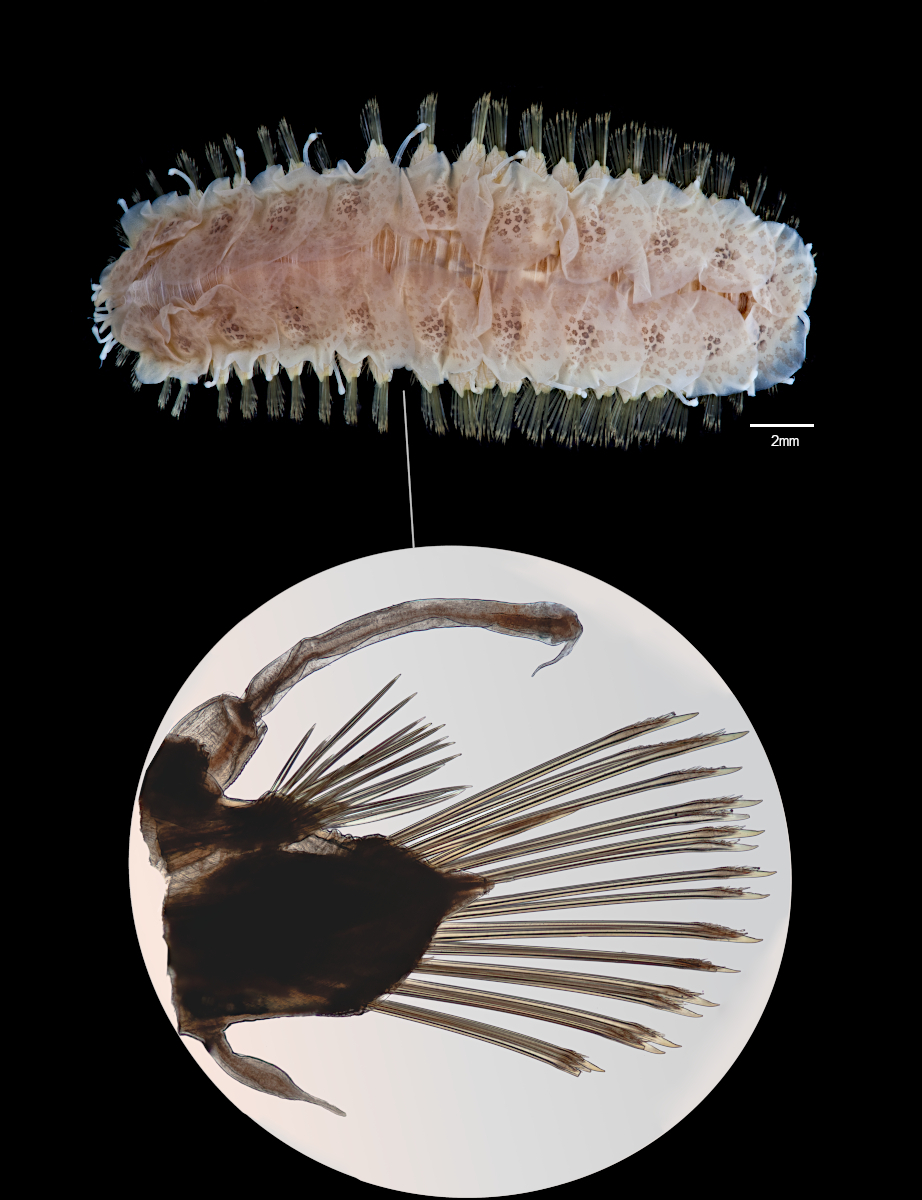
Specimen of the annelid, Lepidonotus oculatus, with a microscope image of one of its parapodia (inset). Museums Victoria specimen.

In invertebrates, the term parapodium (Gr. para, beyond or beside + podia, feet; pl.: parapodia) refers to lateral outgrowths or protrusions from the body. Parapodia are predominantly found in annelids, where they are paired, unjointed lateral outgrowths that bear the chaetae. In several groups of sea snails and sea slugs, 'parapodium' refers to lateral fleshy protrusions.

== Annelid parapodia ==
An image showing the different anatomical features (dashed outlines) of a representative annelid parapodium. Parapodium is from Lepidonotus oculatus and is a Museums Victoria specimen.

Microscope photograph of a parapodium from a specimen of Arctonoe sp. showing the internal acicula that support the two lobes of the parapodium. This parapodium is from a Museums Victoria specimen.

Most species of polychaete annelids have paired, fleshy parapodia which are segmentally arranged along the body axis. Parapodia vary greatly in size and form, reflecting a variety of functions, such as, anchorage, protection, locomotion, feeding and breathing.

=== General description ===
Parapodia in polychaetes can be uniramous (consisting of one lobe or ramus) but are usually biramous (two lobes or rami). In the latter case, the dorsal lobes are called notopodia and the ventral lobes neuropodia. Both neuropodia and notopodia may possess a bundle of chaetae (neurochaetae and notochaetae respectively, a chaetae-bearing parapodium is called chaetiger), which are highly specific and greatly diversified. A single stout internal chaeta, called an acicula, may be present in each lobe, which are used to support well-developed parapodia. Notopodia and neuropodia can also bear cirri which are tentacle-like projections of the parapodia. In some groups, such as the scale worms (e.g. Polynoidae), the dorsal cirrus is modified into a scale (or elytron).

In most species, the anteriormost segments may be specialised into the head region and prostomium, which can result in the modification of those parapodia, loss of chaetae and elongation of the cirri into anterior-facing tentacular cirri.

=== Glossary of components of the parapodium ===
Component	Description
Dorsal cirrus	Cirrus extending from the notopodium; can be modified into a scale (or elytron) in scale worms.
Neuroaciculum	Stout internal supporting chaeta (acicula) for the neuropodium
Neurochaetae	Chaetae of the neuropodium
Neuropodium	Ventral lobe
Notoaciculum	Stout internal supporting chaeta (acicula) for the notopodium
Notochaetae	Chaetae of the notopodium
Notopodium	Dorsal lobe
Ventral cirrus	Cirrus extending from the neuropodium

== Gastropod parapodia ==
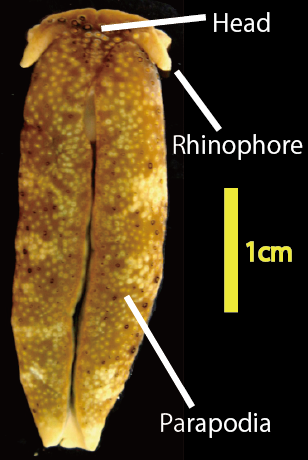
Dorsal view of a freshly collected intact sea slug, Plakobranchus ocellatus, showing its head, rhinophores and parapodia.

The fleshy protrusions on the sides of some marine gastropods are also called parapodia. They are particularly well-developed in sea butterflies. Some sea hares use their parapodia to swim. Parapodia can even be used for respiration (similar to gills) or for locomotion.

Parapodia are found in the following taxonomic groups of gastropods:

- Clade Cephalaspidea
- Clade Thecosomata
- Clade Gymnosomata
- Clade Aplysiomorpha

== Dickinsonia ==
Certain structures of Dickinsonia, an extinct animal of uncertain classification, have been – although controversially – described as reduced parapodia. More recent studies have not described these structures as such.

== See also ==
- Epitoke parapodium
- Annelida
