= Polynoidae =

- Dorsal view of Lepidonotus oculatus, a polynoid specimen from the Museums Victoria collection.

Scientific classification
- Kingdom: Animalia
- Phylum: Annelida
- Clade: Pleistoannelida
- Subclass: Errantia
- Order: Phyllodocida
- Suborder: Aphroditiformia
- Family: Polynoidae

Genera
- See text

Family of annelids

Polynoidae is a family of marine Polychaete worms known as "scale worms" due to the scale-like elytra on the dorsal surface. Almost 900 species are currently recognised belonging to 9 subfamilies and 167 genera. They are active hunters, but generally dwell in protected environments such as under stones. The group is widely distributed from shallow intertidal waters to hadal trenches. They are the most diverse group of polychaetes in terms of genus number and second most diverse in terms of species number which is almost 8% of all segmented worm species.

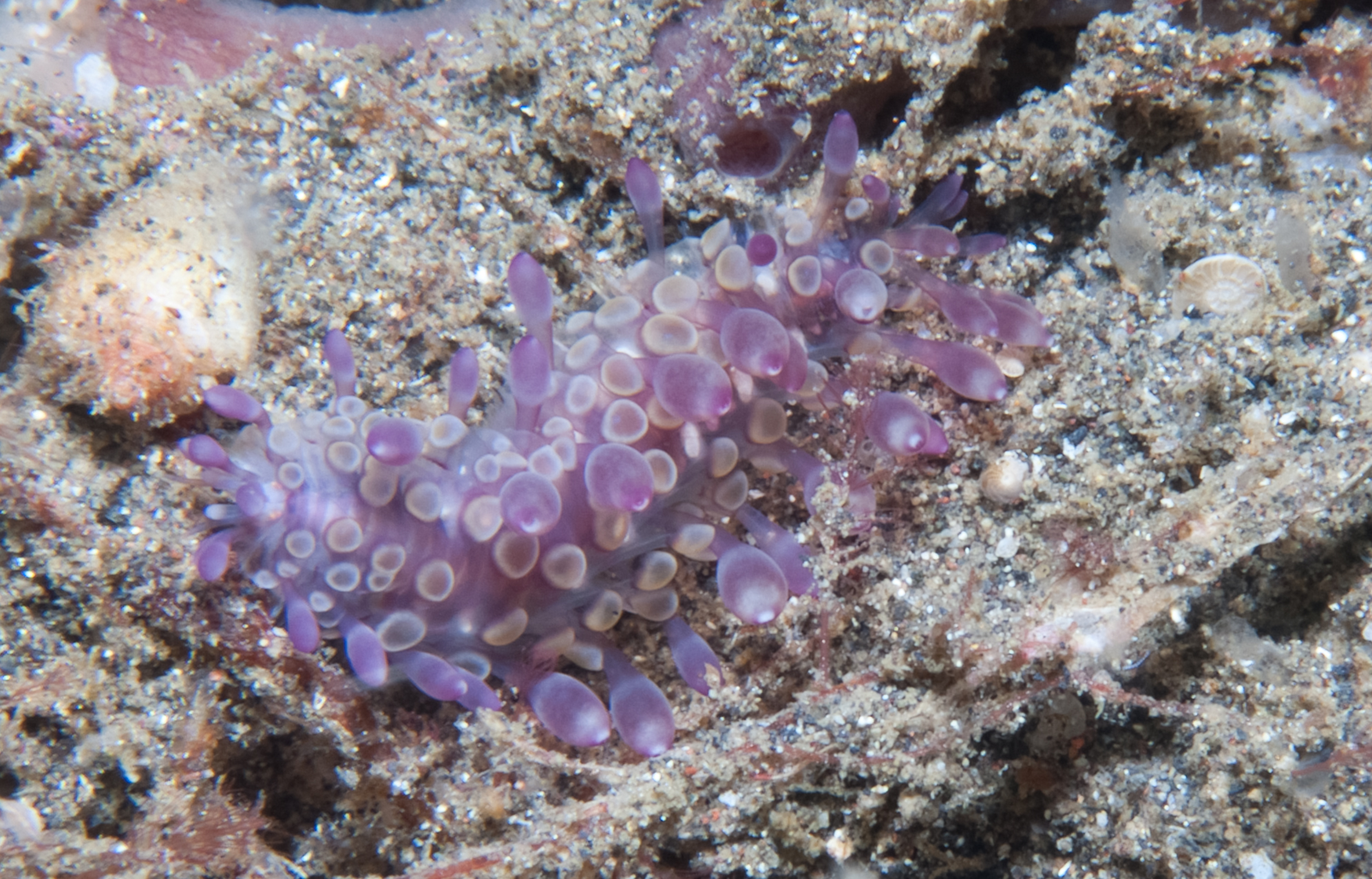
A scale worm moving along the substrate at a depth of 20m in the Lembeh Strait

== Description ==
Most Polynoidae species are short and flattened, but can reach as much as 20 cm in length and 10 cm width in Eulagisca gigantea and Eulagisca uschakovi. Individuals are usually covered almost entirely by elytra, which can be shed and regenerated in many species. The elytra of some species are faintly bioluminescent, and leave glowing traces around the mouthparts of their predators, making those predators more likely to be attacked in turn.

== Deep sea ==
The first deep-sea species of Polynoidae was collected at 1230 m during the Challenger Expedition and a number of subfamilies appear to be restricted to the deep sea below 500 m. Species have colonised submarine caves and hydrothermal vents. Deep sea species are characterised by a partial or complete loss of antennae, fewer segments, a reduction in jaws and delicate elytra.

== Phylogenetic relationships ==
The Polynoidae has been shown to be monophyletic, however relationships within the family are unclear and hence the number of valid subfamilies has been repeatedly revised in recent years. One of the main deep sea subfamilies, the Macellicephalinae has been consistently recovered as paraphyletic, and it has been proposed that ten Polynoid subfamilies could be synonymized with it to create a homogeneous clade characterised by a lack of lateral antennae. More recently, however, one of the synonymized subfamilies was reinstated.

== Genera ==
The following Polynoidae genera are recognised as valid as of June 2020:

- Acanthicolepis
- Acholoe
- Admetella
- Adyte
- Alentia
- Alentiana
- Allmaniella
- Anotochaetonoe
- Antarctinoe
- Antinoe
- Antipathipolyeunoa
- Arcteobia
- Arctonoe
- Arctonoella
- Augenerilepidonotus
- Australaugeneria
- Australonoe
- Austrolaenilla
- Austropolaria
- Barrukia
- Bathyadmetella
- Bathybahamas
- Bathycanadia
- Bathycatalina
- Bathyedithia
- Bathyeliasona
- Bathyfauvelia
- Bathyhololepidella
- Bathykermadeca
- Bathykurila
- Bathylevensteina
- Bathymacella
- Bathymariana
- Bathymiranda
- Bathymoorea
- Bathynoe
- Bathynotalia
- Bathypolaria
- Bathytasmania
- Bathyvitiazia
- Bayerpolynoe
- Benhamipolynoe
- Benhamisetosus
- Branchinotogluma
- Branchiplicatus
- Branchipolynoe
- Bruunilla
- Brychionoe
- Bylgides
- Capitulatinoe
- Cervilia
- Chaetacanthus
- Dilepidonotus
- Diplaconotum
- Disconatis
- Drieschella
- Drieschiopsis
- Enipo
- Eucranta
- Eulagisca
- Eunoe
- Euphione
- Euphionella
- Eupolynoe
- Euphione
- Frennia
- Gastrolepidia
- Gattyana
- Gaudichaudius
- Gesiella
- Gorekia
- Gorgoniapolynoe
- Grubeopolynoe
- Halosydna
- Halosydnella
- Halosydnopsis
- Harmothoe
- Hartmania
- Hemilepidia
- Hermadion
- Hermadionella
- Hermenia
- Hermilepidonotus
- Hesperonoe
- Heteralentia
- Heteropolynoe
- Hololepida
- Hololepidella
- Hylosydna
- Hyperhalosydna
- Intoshella
- Kermadecella
- Lagisca
- Lepidametria
- Lepidasthenia
- Lepidastheniella
- Lepidofimbria
- Lepidogyra
- Lepidonopsis
- Lepidonotopodium
- Lepidonotus
- Leucia
- Levensteiniella
- Lobopelma
- Macellicephala
- Macellicephaloides
- Macelloides
- Malmgrenia
- Medioantenna
- Melaenis
- Minusculisquama
- Natopolynoe
- Neobylgides
- Neohololepidella
- Neolagisca
- Neopolynoe
- Nonparahalosydna
- Olgalepidonotus
- Ophthalmonoe
- Parabathynoe
- Paradyte
- Paragattyana
- Parahalosydna
- Parahalosydnopsis
- Parahololepidella
- Paralentia
- Paralepidonotus
- Paranychia
- Parapolyeunoa
- Pararctonoella
- Pareulagisca
- Peinaleopolynoe
- Pelagomacellicephala
- Perolepis
- Pettibonesia
- Phyllantinoe
- Phyllohartmania
- Phyllosheila
- Podarmus
- Polaruschakov
- Polyeunoa
- Polynoe
- Polynoella
- Polynoina
- Pottsiscalisetosus
- Pseudohalosydna
- Pseudopolynoe
- Robertianella
- Rullieriella
- Russellhanleya
- Scalisetosus
- Sheila
- Showapolynoe
- Showascalisetosus
- Subadyte
- Telodrieschia
- Telolepidasthenia
- Tenonia
- Thermopolynoe
- Thormora
- Tottonpolynoe
- Uncopolynoe
- Vampiropolynoe
- Verrucapelma
- Yodanoe
- Ysideria

== Further information ==
- Brusca, R.C.; Brusca, G.J. (1990). Invertebrates.
