= Korynetinae =

Scientific classification
- Kingdom: Animalia
- Phylum: Arthropoda
- Clade: Pancrustacea
- Class: Insecta
- Order: Coleoptera
- Suborder: Polyphaga
- Infraorder: Cucujiformia
- Family: Cleridae
- Subfamily: Korynetinae; Laporte, 1838

Subfamily of beetles

Korynetinae is a subfamily of checkered beetles in the family Cleridae. It was first described by Laporte in 1838. It contains 30 genera. The number of accepted species is still debated, but ranges from 195 to 335.

== Genera ==
- Amboakis Optiz,2006
- Boschella Barr, 1980
- Chariessa Perty, 1830
- Corinthiscus Farimaire & Germain, 1861
- Cregya LeConte, 1861
- Dermestoides Schäffer, 1777
- Diutius Optiz, 2014
- Enoplium Latreille, 1802
- Epiphloeus Spinola, 1841
- Ichnea Laporte, 1838
- Iontoclerus Optiz, 1997
- Korynetes Herbst, 1792
- Lebasiella Spinola, 1844
- Loedelia Lucas, 1920
- Madoniella Pic, 1935
- Necrobia Latreille, 1797
- Necrobinus Reitter, 1894
- Neorthopleura Barr, 1976
- Opetiopalpus Spinola, 1845
- Parapelonides Barr, 1980
- Paratillus Gorham, 1876
- Pelonides Kuwert, 1894
- Pelonium Spinola, 1845
- Pennasolis Optis, 2008
- Phymatophaea Pascoe, 1876
- Platynoptera Cherolat, 1834
- Plocamocera Spinola, 1845
- Pujoliclerus Pic, 1950
- Pyticeroides Kuwert, 1894
- Tarsostenus Spinola, 1845
