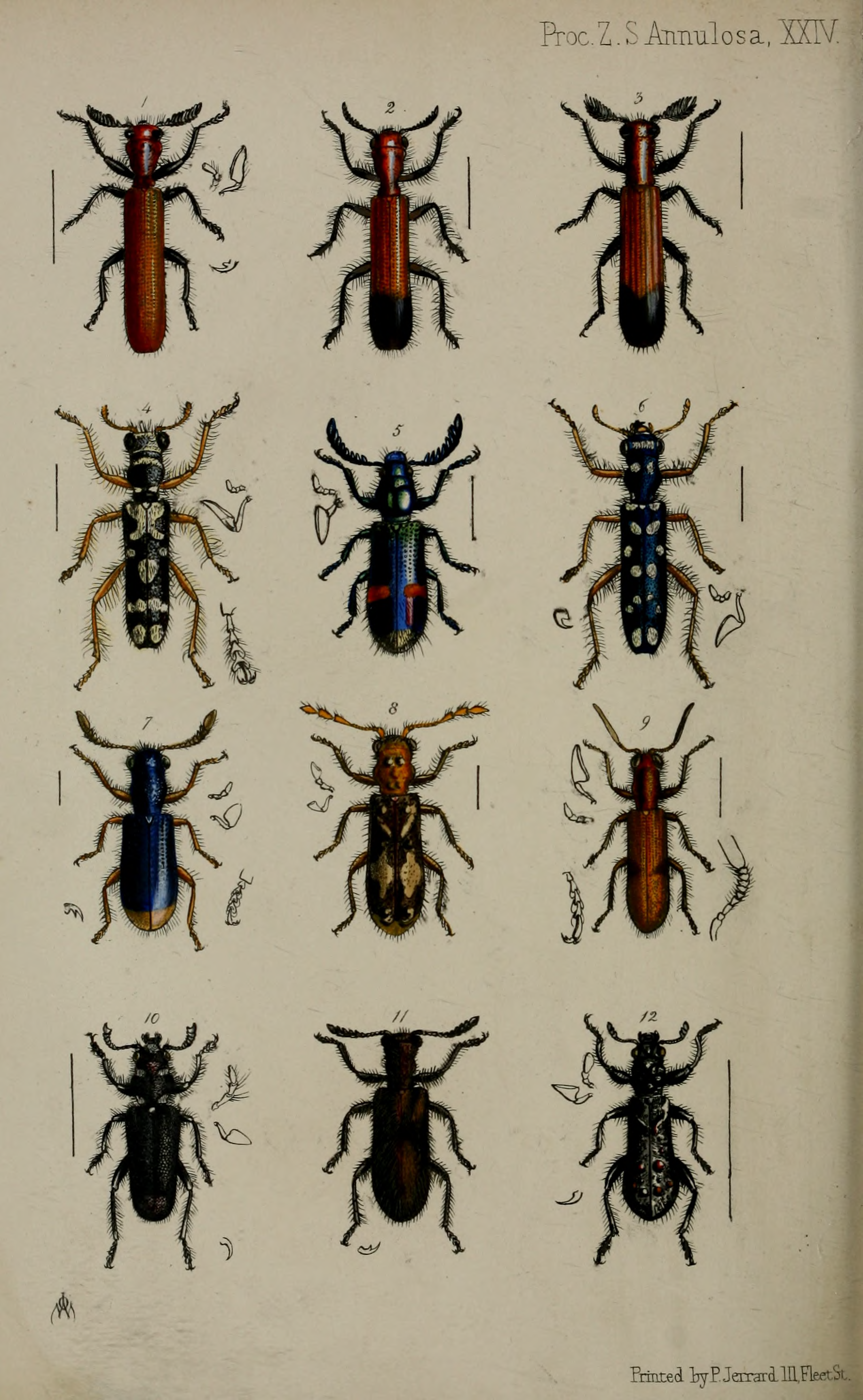
- Twelve species of checkered beetles, some with anatomical details of labial palps and legs.Proceedings of the Zoological Society of London (vol. 1852, plate Annulosa XXIV). J.O.Westwood, 1852 4: Clerus (Xylobius) albo-varius Westw., "Himalaya" = Callimerus albovarius (Westwood in White, 1849); 6: Clerus (Xylobius?) dulcis Westw., "Java" = Callimerus dulcis (Westwood, 1852)

Scientific classification
- Kingdom: Animalia
- Phylum: Arthropoda
- Clade: Pancrustacea
- Class: Insecta
- Order: Coleoptera
- Suborder: Polyphaga
- Infraorder: Cucujiformia
- Family: Cleridae
- Subfamily: Hydnocerinae
- Genus: Callimerus; Gorham, 1876

Species
- Several, including: Callimerus albovarius (Westwood in White, 1849); Callimerus dulcis (Westwood, 1852)

Synonyms
- Brachycallimerus Chapin, 1924; Caloclerus Kuwert, 1893; Cucujocallimerus Pic, 1929; Stenocallimerus Corporaal & Pic, 1940

= Callimerus =

Genus of beetles

Callimerus is a genus of beetles in the family Cleridae (the checkered beetles).
