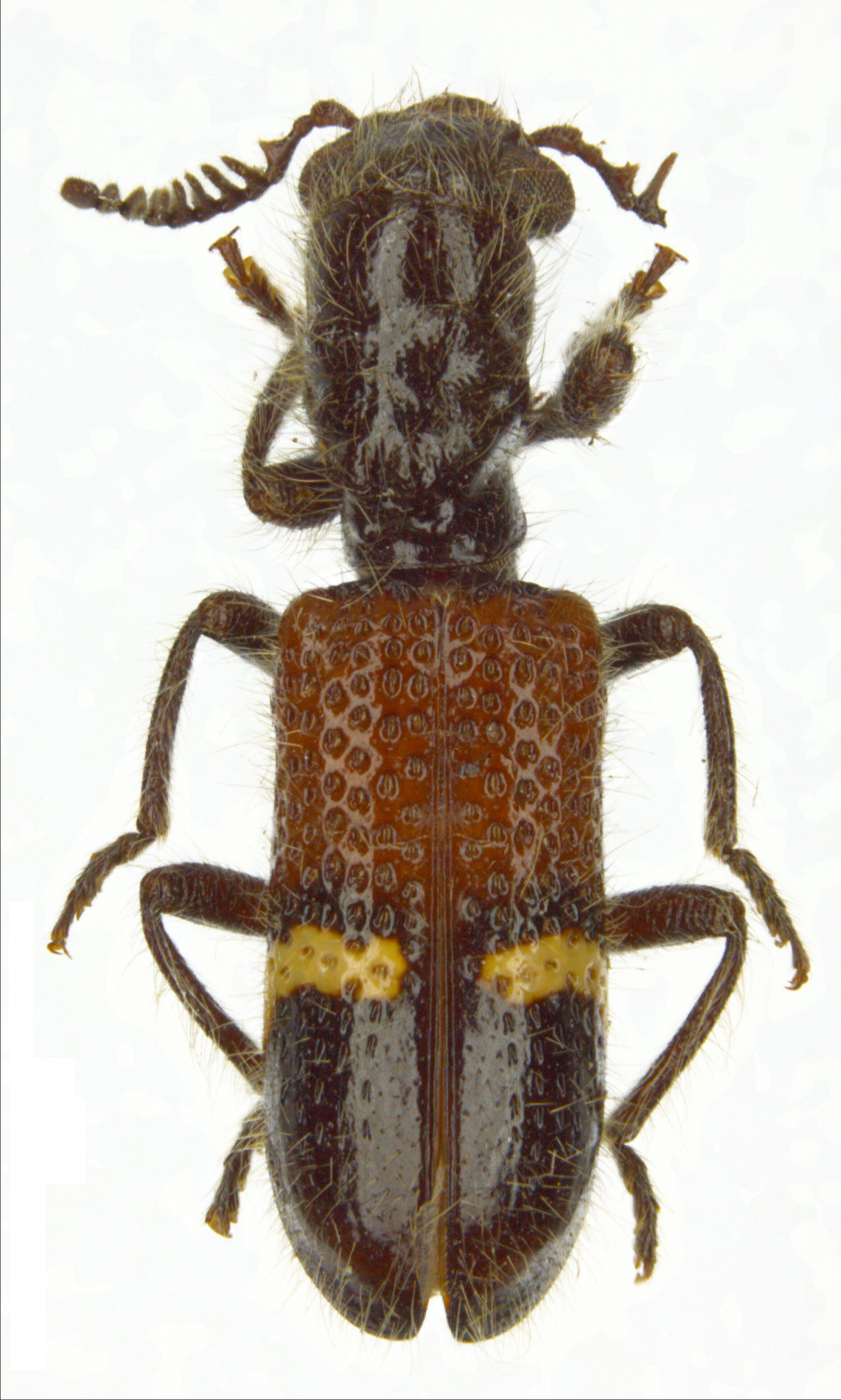
- Diplocladus kuwerti

Scientific classification
- Kingdom: Animalia
- Phylum: Arthropoda
- Clade: Pancrustacea
- Class: Insecta
- Order: Coleoptera
- Suborder: Polyphaga
- Infraorder: Cucujiformia
- Family: Cleridae
- Subfamily: Tillinae; Leach, 1815

Genera
- See text

= Tillinae =

Subfamily of beetles

Tillinae is a subfamily of beetles in the family Cleridae, the checkered beetles.

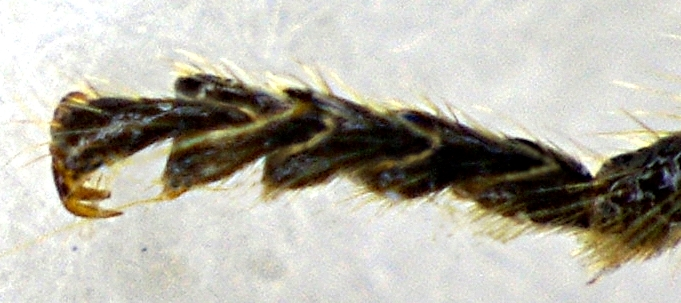
5 rear leg tarsomeres of Tillus elongates

== Genera ==
- Antenius Fairmaire, 1903
- Arachnoclerus Fairmaire, 1902
- Araeodontia Barr, 1952
- Archalius Fairmaire, 1903
- Aroterus Schenkling, 1906
- Basilewskyus Pic, 1950
- Biflabellotillus Pic, 1949
- Bilbotillus Kolibac, 1997
- Bogcia Barr, 1978
- Bostrichoclerus Van Dyke, 1938
- Callotillus Wolcott, 1911
- Ceratocopus Hintz, 1902
- Chilioclerus Solervicens, 1976
- Cladiscopallenis Pic, 1949
- Cladiscus Chevrolat, 1843
- Cladomorpha Pic, 1949
- Cteniopachys Fairmaire, 1889
- Cylidroctenus Kraatz, 1899
- Cylidrus Latreille, 1825
- Cymatodera Gray in Griffith, 1832
- Cymatoderella Barr, 1962
- Dedana Fairmaire, 1888
- Denops Fischer von Waldheim, 1829
- Diplocladus Fairmaire, 1885
- Diplopherusa Heller, 1921
- Eburneocladiscus Pic, 1955
- Egenocladiscus Corporaal & van der Wiel, 1949
- Elasmocylidrus Corporaal, 1939
- Enoploclerus Hintz, 1902
- Eucymatodera Schenkling, 1899
- Falsopallenis Pic, 1926
- Falsotillus Gerstmeier & Kuff, 1992
- Flabellotilloidea Gerstmeier & Kuff, 1992
- Gastrocentrum Gorham, 1876
- Gracilotillus Pic, 1933
- Impressopallenis Pic, 1953
- Isocymatodera Hintz, 1902
- Lecontella Wolcott & Chapin, 1918
- Leptoclerus Kraatz, 1899
- Liostylus Fairmaire, 1886
- Macroliostylus Pic, 1939
- Magnotillus Pic, 1936
- Melanoclerus Chapin, 1919
- Microtillus Pic, 1950
- Monophylla Spinola, 1841
- Neocallotillus Burke, 2016
- Nodepus Gorham, 1892
- Notocymatodera Schenkling, 1907
- Onychotillus Chapin, 1945
- Orthocladiscus Corporaal & van der Wiel, 1949
- Pallenis Laporte de Castelnau, 1836
- Paracladiscus Miyatake, 1965
- Paradoxocerus Kraatz, 1899
- Paraspinoza Corporaal, 1942
- Philocalus Klug, 1842
- Picoclerus Corporaal, 1936
- †Prospinoza (fossil)
- Pseudachlamys Duvivier, 1892
- Pseudogyponix Pic, 1939
- Pseudopallenis Kuwert, 1893
- Pseudoteloclerus Pic, 1932
- Rhopaloclerus Fairmaire, 1886
- Smudlotillus Kolibac, 1997
- Spinoza Lewis, 1892
- Stenocylidrus Spinola, 1844
- Strotocera Schenkling, 1902
- Synellapotillus Pic, 1939
- Synellapus Fairmaire, 1903
- Teloclerus Schenkling, 1903
- Tilloclerus White, 1849
- Tillodadiscus Pic, 1953
- Tillodenops Hintz, 1905
- Tilloidea Laporte de Castelnau, 1832
- Tillus Olivier, 1790
- Tylotosoma Hintz, 1902
