= Callotillus =

Scientific classification
- Kingdom: Animalia
- Phylum: Arthropoda
- Clade: Pancrustacea
- Class: Insecta
- Order: Coleoptera
- Suborder: Polyphaga
- Infraorder: Cucujiformia
- Family: Cleridae
- Subfamily: Tillinae
- Genus: Callotillus; Wolcott, 1911

Species
- Callotillus bahamensis Vaurie, 1952; Callotillus crusoe Wolcott, 1923; Callotillus eburneocinctus Wolcott, 1911; Callotillus elegans (Erichson, 1847); Callotillus intricatus Wolcott and Dybas, 1947

Genus of checkered beetles

Callotillus is a genus of beetles in the family Cleridae, the checkered beetles.

Names brought to synonymy

- Callotillus elegans (Erichson, 1847), a synonym for Neocallotillus elegans
