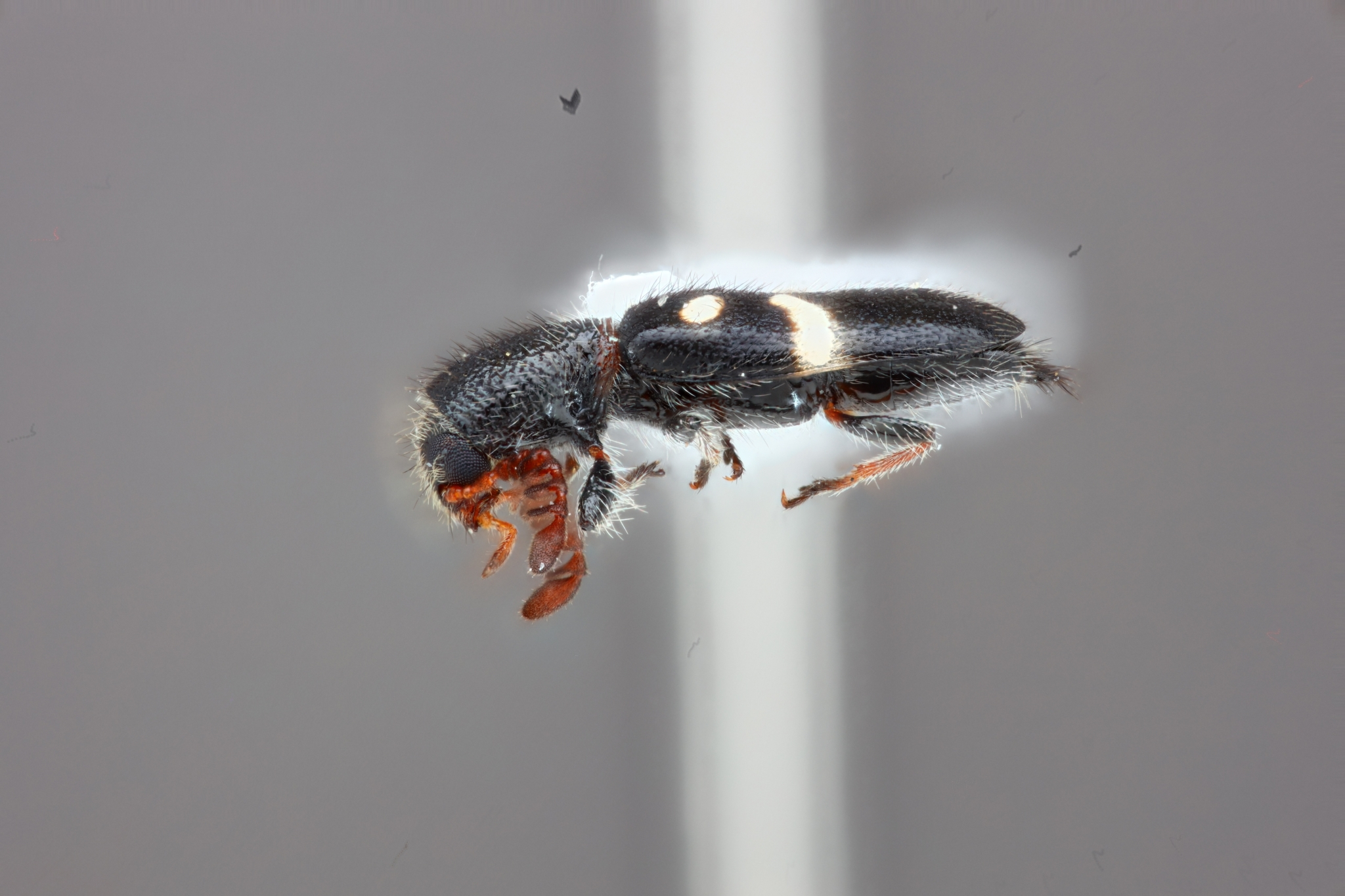

Scientific classification
- Kingdom: Animalia
- Phylum: Arthropoda
- Clade: Pancrustacea
- Class: Insecta
- Order: Coleoptera
- Suborder: Polyphaga
- Infraorder: Cucujiformia
- Family: Cleridae
- Genus: Neocallotillus
- Species: N. elegans

Binomial name
- Neocallotillus elegans (Erichson, 1847)

Synonyms
- Callotillus elegans Erichson, 1847

= Neocallotillus elegans =

Species of beetle

Neocallotillus elegans is a species of checkered beetle in the genus Neocallotillus found in Nevada, California, New Mexico, Texas, Louisiana, Arizona, Mexico and the Central America.
