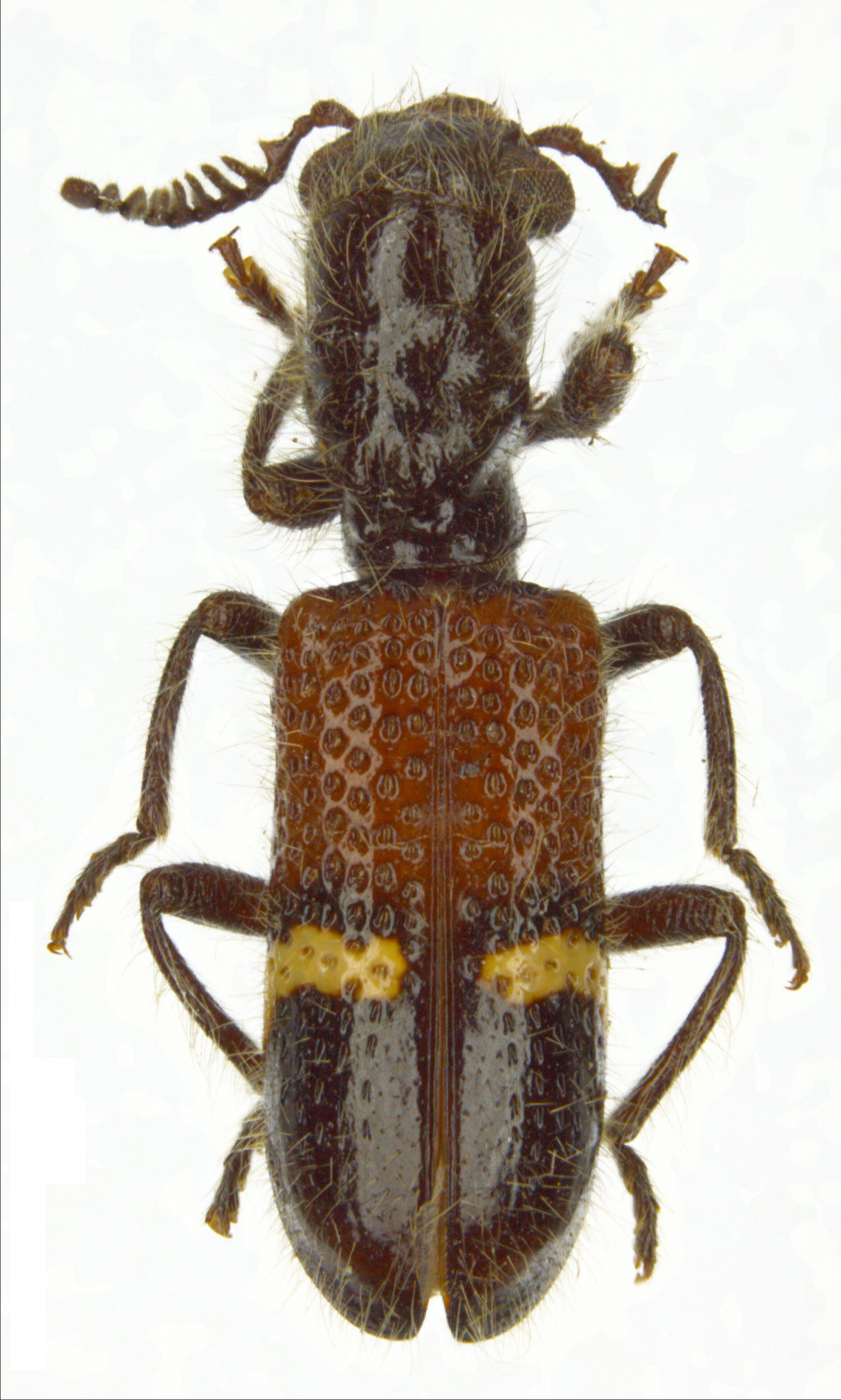
- Diplocladus kuwerti

Scientific classification
- Domain: Eukaryota
- Kingdom: Animalia
- Phylum: Arthropoda
- Class: Insecta
- Order: Coleoptera
- Suborder: Polyphaga
- Infraorder: Cucujiformia
- Family: Cleridae
- Genus: Diplocladus
- Species: D. kuwerti

Binomial name
- Diplocladus kuwerti (Hintz, 1897)

= Diplocladus kuwerti =

Species of beetle

Diplocladus kuwerti is a species of beetles in the subfamily Tillinae.
