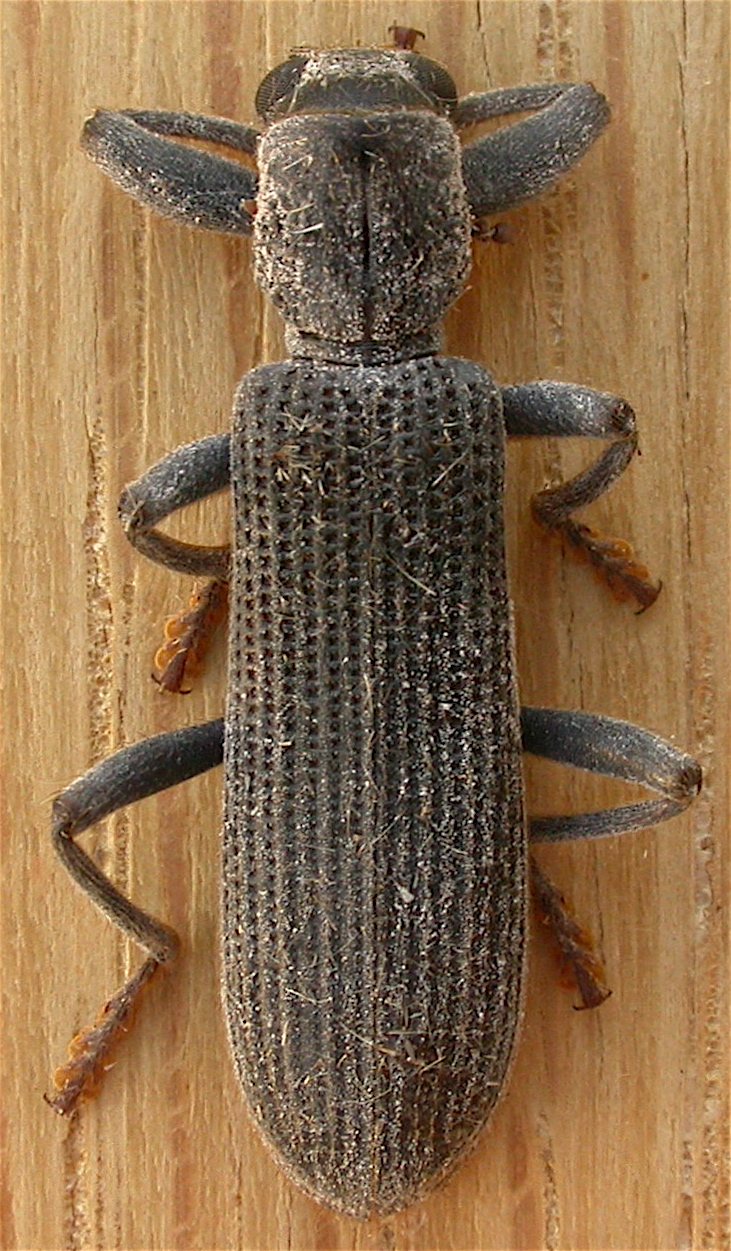

Scientific classification
- Kingdom: Animalia
- Phylum: Arthropoda
- Class: Insecta
- Order: Coleoptera
- Suborder: Polyphaga
- Infraorder: Cucujiformia
- Family: Cleridae
- Genus: Eunatalis
- Species: E. porcata

Binomial name
- Eunatalis porcata (Fabricius, 1787)

= Eunatalis porcata =

Species of beetle

Eunatalis porcata is a species of Cleridae that occurs in Australia
