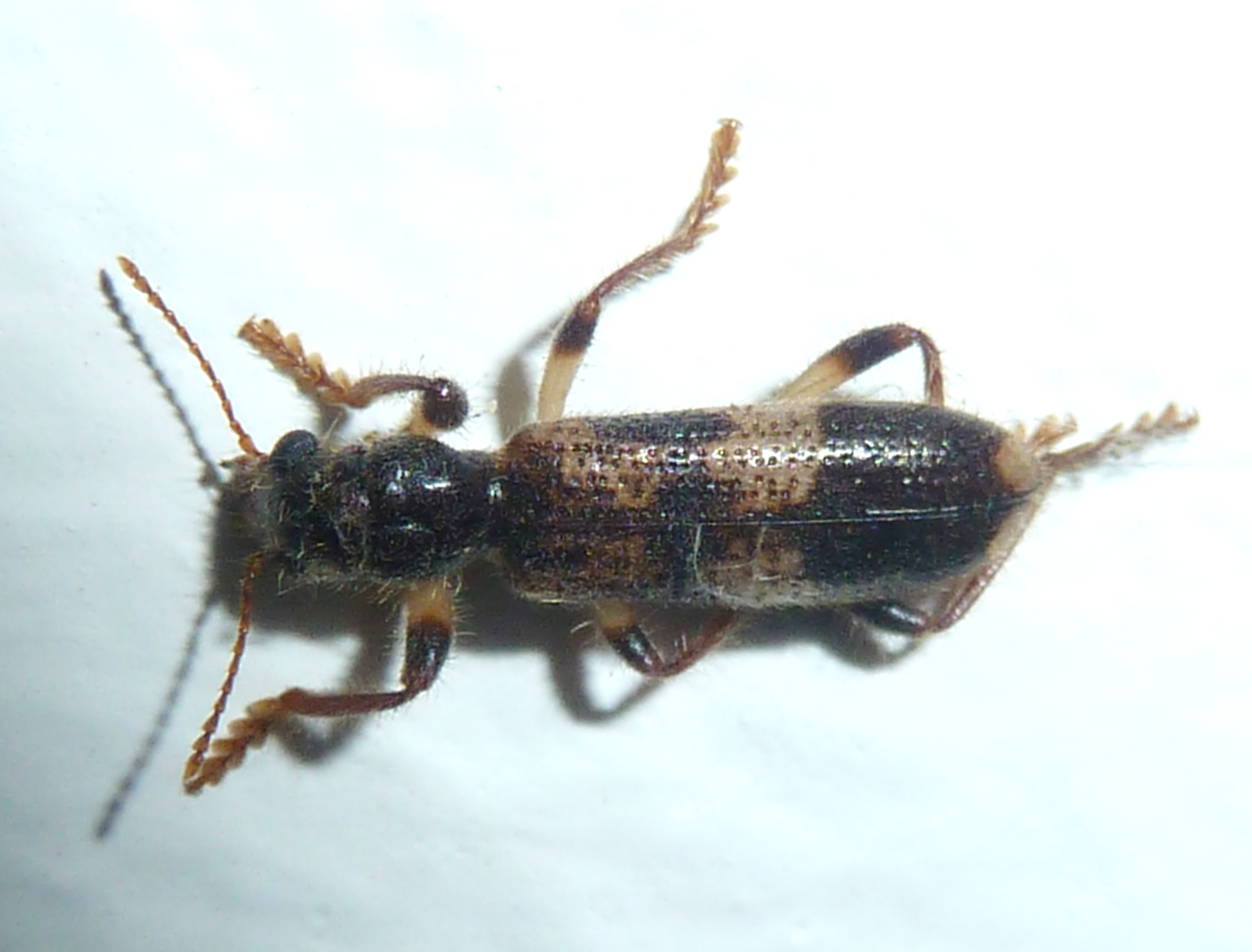

Scientific classification
- Kingdom: Animalia
- Phylum: Arthropoda
- Class: Insecta
- Order: Coleoptera
- Suborder: Polyphaga
- Infraorder: Cucujiformia
- Family: Cleridae
- Genus: Gyponyx; Gorham, 1883

= Gyponyx =

Genus of beetles

Gyponyx is a large genus of nocturnal, Afrotropical checkered beetles, with a fairly constant colour pattern on the elytra. They may be carnivorous as adults and as larvae, but are poorly studied.
