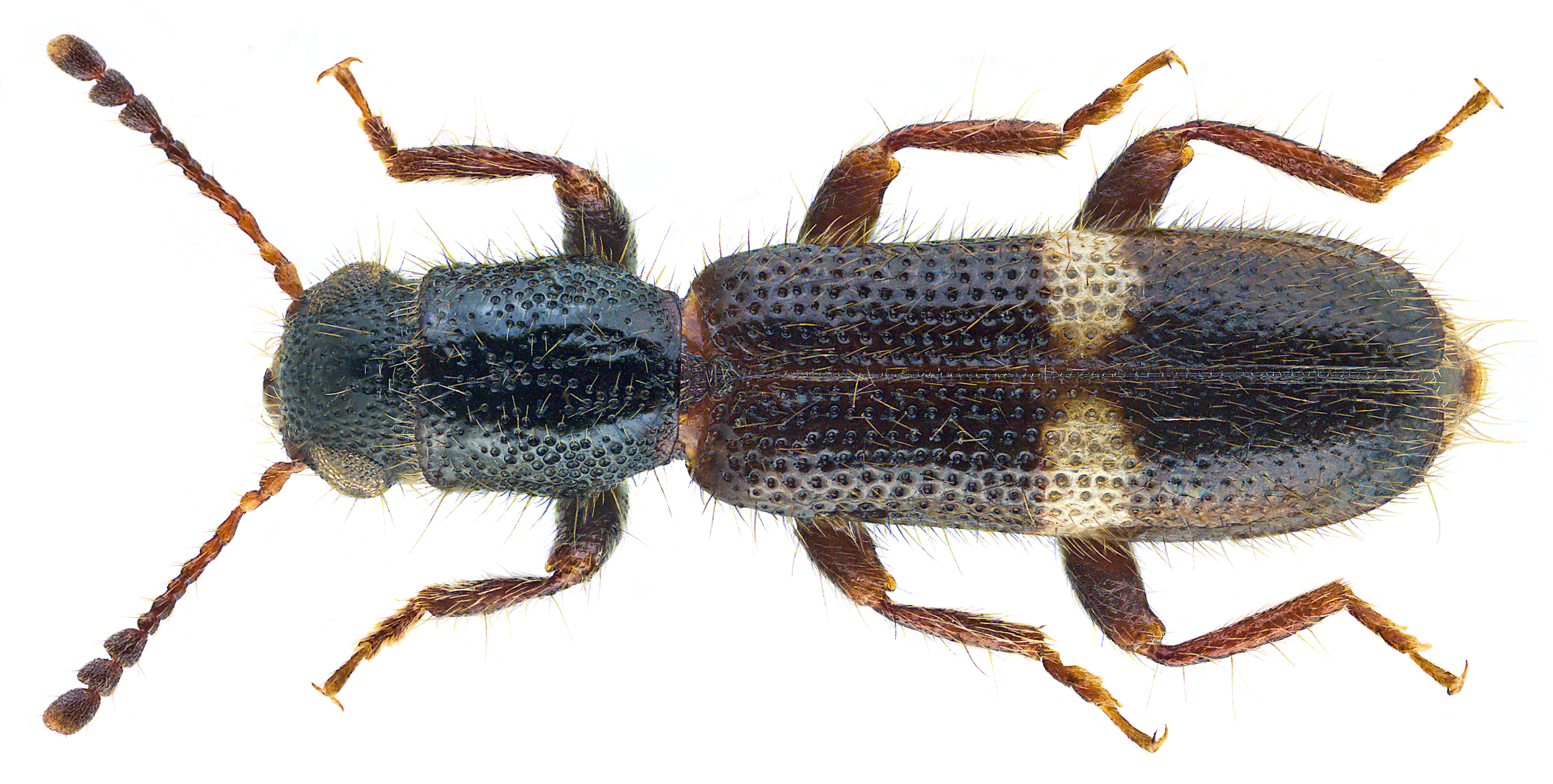
- Tarsostenus univittatus

Scientific classification
- Domain: Eukaryota
- Kingdom: Animalia
- Phylum: Arthropoda
- Class: Insecta
- Order: Coleoptera
- Suborder: Polyphaga
- Infraorder: Cucujiformia
- Family: Cleridae
- Subfamily: Tarsosteninae; Jacquelin du Val, 1860

= Tarsosteninae =

Subfamily of beetles

Tarsosteninae is a subfamily of checkered beetles in the family Cleridae. There are at least two genera and two described species in Tarsosteninae.

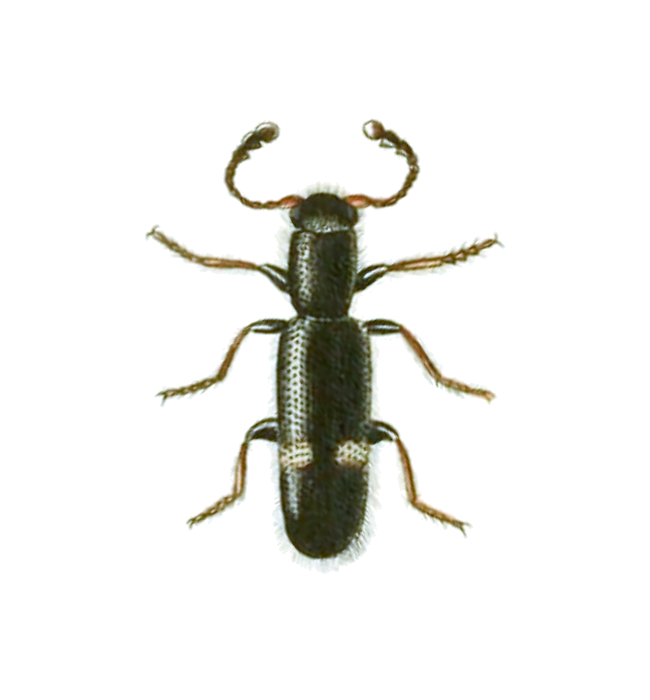
Tarsostenus univittatus

== Genera ==
These two genera belong to the subfamily Tarsosteninae:

- Paratillus Gorham, 1876
- Tarsostenus Spinola, 1844
