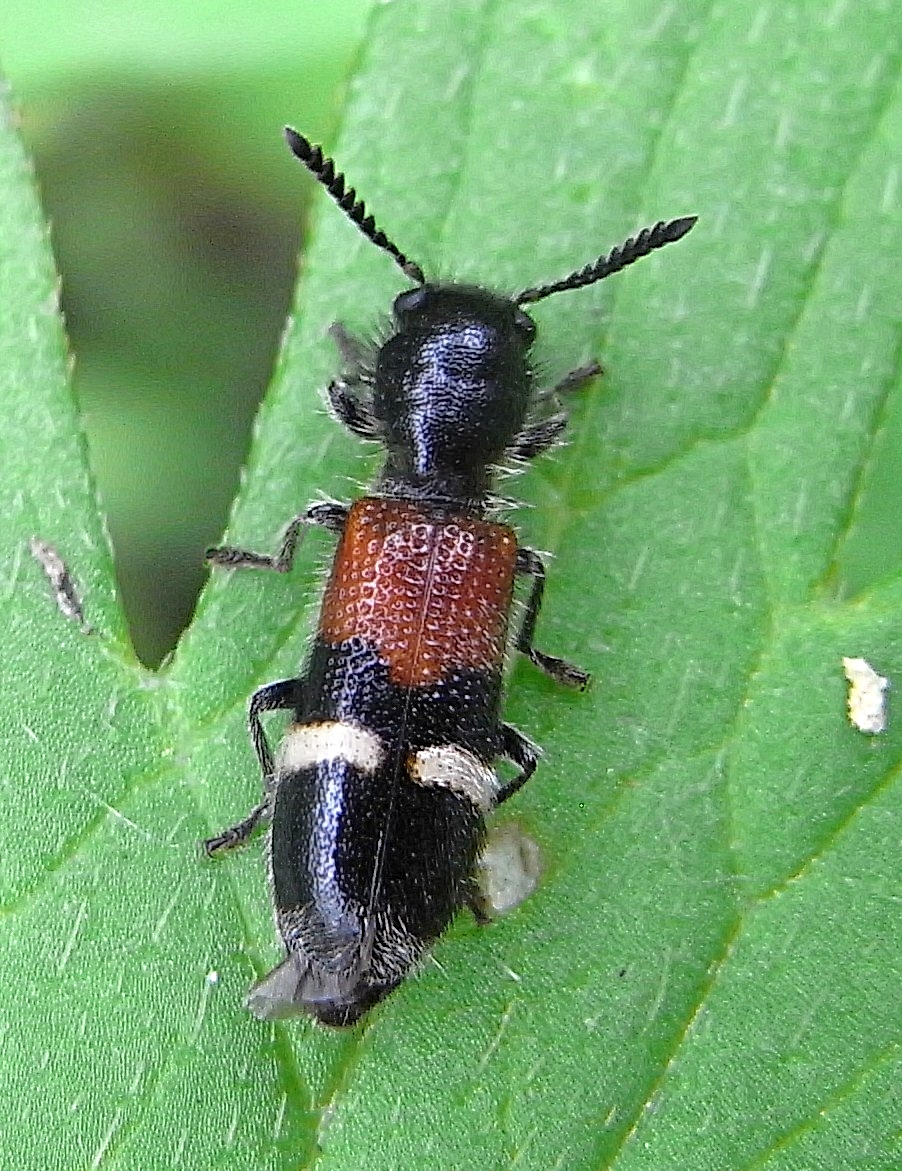
- Tilloidea unifasciata, Hungary

Scientific classification
- Domain: Eukaryota
- Kingdom: Animalia
- Phylum: Arthropoda
- Class: Insecta
- Order: Coleoptera
- Suborder: Polyphaga
- Infraorder: Cucujiformia
- Family: Cleridae
- Subfamily: Tillinae
- Genus: Tilloidea; Laporte, 1832

= Tilloidea =

Genus of beetles

Tilloidea is a genus of checkered beetles in the family Cleridae. There are about six described species in Tilloidea. They are found in Europe, North Africa, South and Southeast Asia, and Pacific islands.

== Species ==
These six species belong to the genus Tilloidea:

- Tilloidea birmanics (Gorham, 1892)
- Tilloidea iranica Gerstmeier & Kuff, 1992
- Tilloidea laevigata (Peyerimhoff, 1927)
- Tilloidea notata (Klug, 1842)
- Tilloidea transversalis (Charpentier, 1825)
- Tilloidea unifasciata (Fabricius, 1787)
