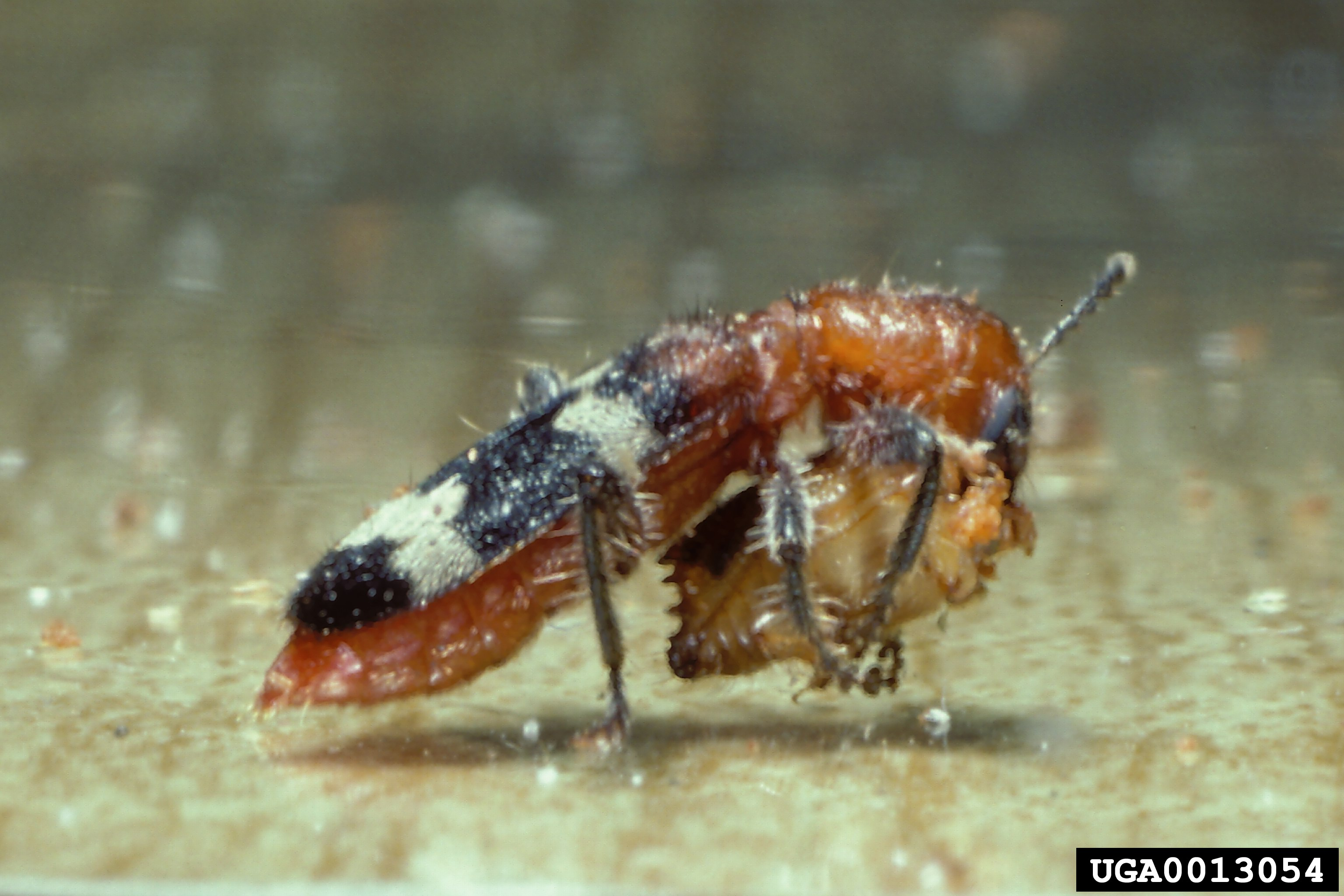

Scientific classification
- Kingdom: Animalia
- Phylum: Arthropoda
- Clade: Pancrustacea
- Class: Insecta
- Order: Coleoptera
- Suborder: Polyphaga
- Infraorder: Cucujiformia
- Family: Cleridae
- Genus: Thanasimus
- Species: T. dubius

Binomial name
- Thanasimus dubius (Fabricius, 1776)

= Thanasimus dubius =

Species of beetle

Thanasimus dubius, known generally as the wavering checkered beetle, is a species of checkered beetle in the family Cleridae. Other common names include the dubious checkered beetle and American bark beetle destroyer. It is found in Central America and North America.
