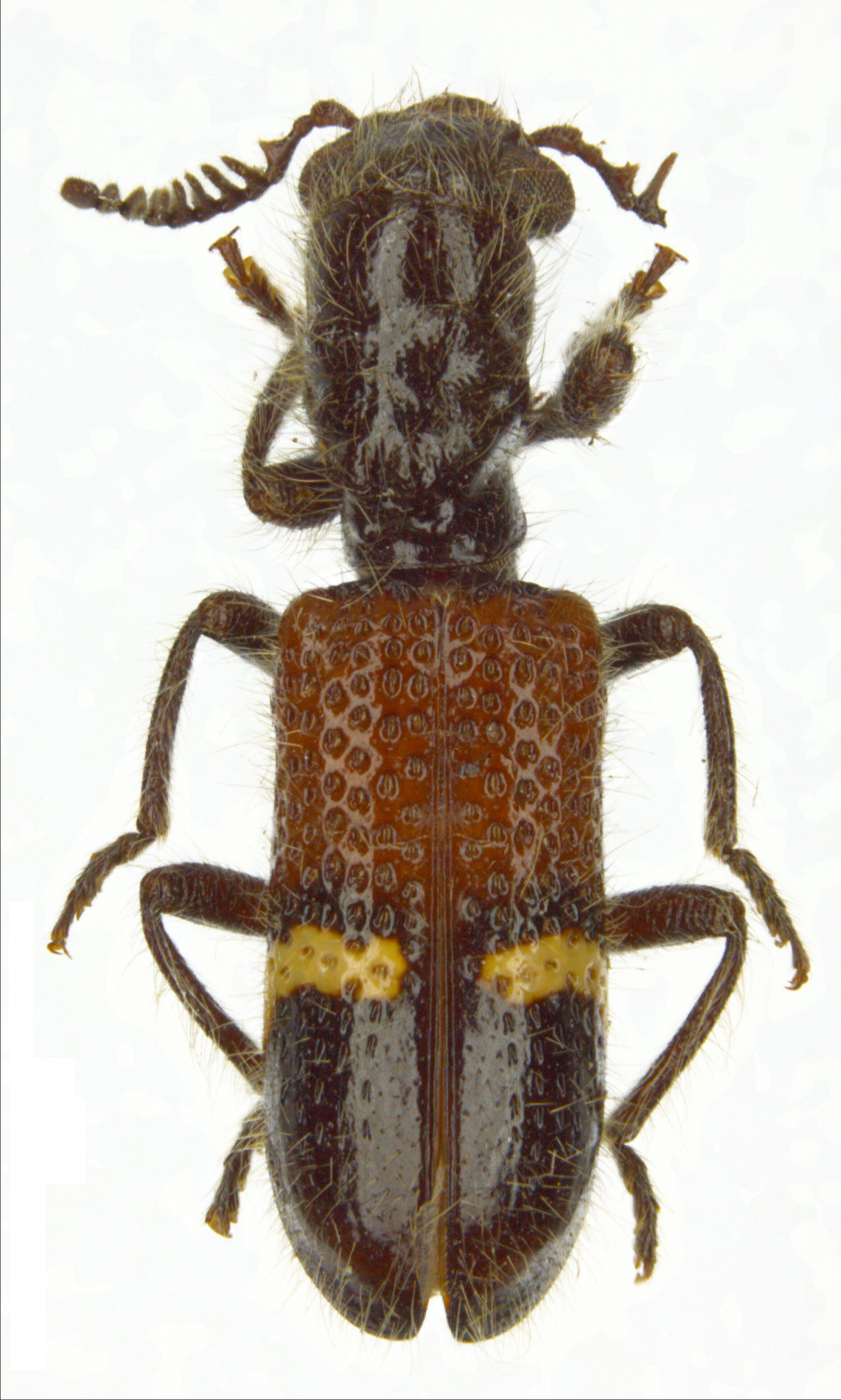
- Diplocladus kuwerti

Scientific classification
- Kingdom: Animalia
- Phylum: Arthropoda
- Class: Insecta
- Order: Coleoptera
- Suborder: Polyphaga
- Infraorder: Cucujiformia
- Family: Cleridae
- Subfamily: Tillinae
- Genus: Diplocladus; Fairmaire, 1885

Species
- See text

= Diplocladus =

Genus of beetles

Diplocladus is a genus of beetles in the subfamily Tillinae.

== Species ==
Diplocladus arabicus - Diplocladus bipunctatus - Diplocladus compactus - Diplocladus ebureofasciatus - Diplocladus kuwerti - Diplocladus louvelii - Diplocladus nigrinus - Diplocladus oculicollis - Diplocladus pulcher - Diplocladus rufobasalis - Diplocladus rufus
