= Wolcottia =

Scientific classification
- Domain: Eukaryota
- Kingdom: Animalia
- Phylum: Arthropoda
- Class: Insecta
- Order: Coleoptera
- Suborder: Polyphaga
- Infraorder: Cucujiformia
- Family: Cleridae
- Subfamily: Hydnocerinae
- Genus: Wolcottia; Chapin, 1917

Genus of beetles

Wolcottia is a genus of checkered beetles in the family Cleridae. There are at least three described species in Wolcottia.

== Species ==
These three species belong to the genus Wolcottia:

- Wolcottia parviceps (Schaeffer, 1908)
- Wolcottia pedalis (LeConte, 1866)
- Wolcottia sobrina (Fall, 1906)
