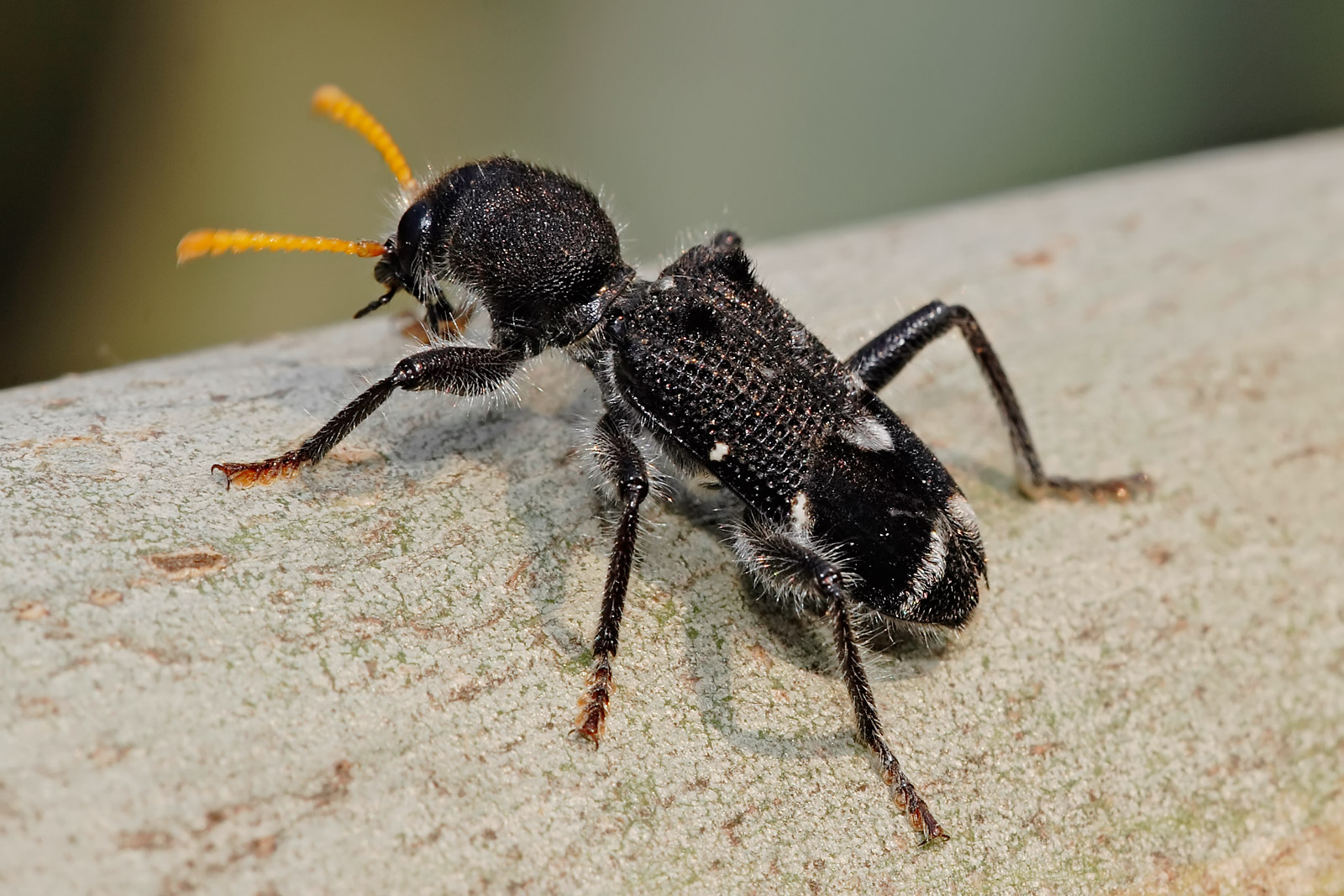

Scientific classification
- Kingdom: Animalia
- Phylum: Arthropoda
- Class: Insecta
- Order: Coleoptera
- Suborder: Polyphaga
- Infraorder: Cucujiformia
- Family: Cleridae
- Genus: Trogodendron
- Species: T. fasciculatum

Binomial name
- Trogodendron fasciculatum Schreibers, 1802

= Trogodendron fasciculatum =

Species of beetle

Trogodendron fasciculatum, the yellowhorned clerid, is a small beetle of the family Cleridae (checkered beetles). T. fasciculatum is native to Australia, and feeds on other insects.
