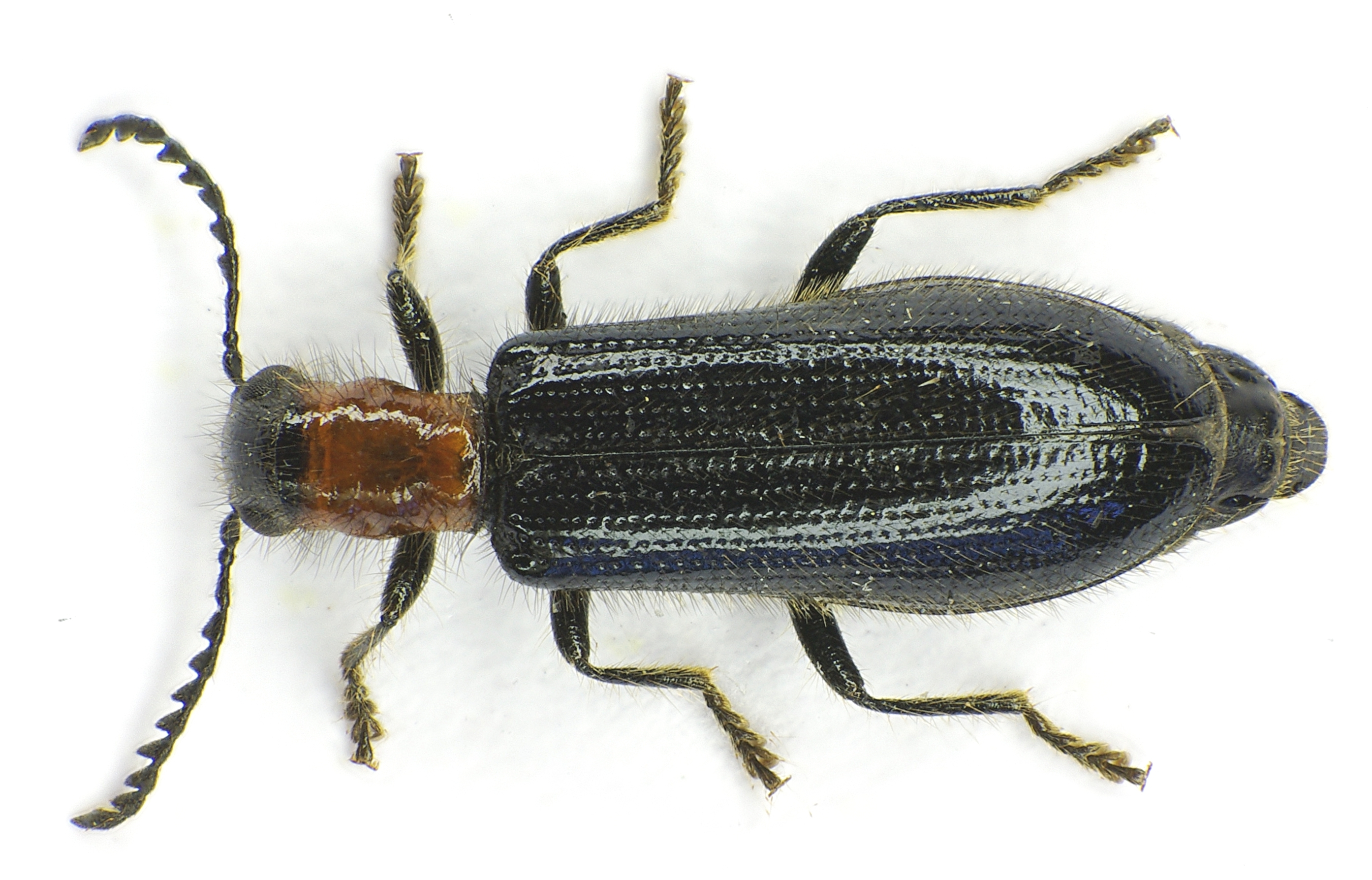
- Tillus elongatus

Scientific classification
- Domain: Eukaryota
- Kingdom: Animalia
- Phylum: Arthropoda
- Class: Insecta
- Order: Coleoptera
- Suborder: Polyphaga
- Infraorder: Cucujiformia
- Family: Cleridae
- Subfamily: Tillinae
- Genus: Tillus; Olivier, 1790

= Tillus =

Genus of beetles

Tillus is a genus of beetles belonging to the family Cleridae.

The genus was first described by Guillaume-Antoine Olivier in 1790.

The genus has cosmopolitan distribution.

== Selected species ==
- Tillus elongatus Linnaeus, 1758
- Tillus notatus Klug, 1842
