= Johannes Bastiaan Corporaal =

Dutch entomologist (1880–1952)

- Born: 23 April 1880; The Hague, Netherlands
- Died: 28 May 1952 (aged 72); Amsterdam, Netherlands
- Occupation: Entomologist

Johannes Bastiaan Corporaal (23 April 1880 – 28 May 1952) was a Dutch entomologist who specialised in Coleoptera. Corporaal was considered a world authority on the beetle family Cleridae.

== Biography ==
Corporaal was born at The Hague on 23 April 1880. His parents were an Official, Gerard Cornelis Corporaal (also known as Cornelis Gerardus Korporaal) and Anna Corporaal (née van Hunsel), who were married on 21 June 1877.

Corporaal's early education was at the Technische Hogeschool in Delft; he then moved to Wageningen for studies at the National Agricultural School, hoping to go on to work in Indonesia (then the Dutch East Indies). He received his Agricultural diploma on 5 July 1902.

In 1903 Corporaal traveled to Indonesia, where he worked first at Java and then at Sumatra as an assistant tobacco planter at plantations belonging to the company Senembah Maatschappij. From 1912 Corporaal was Manager of a tea and rubber plantation in Java. Corporaal's work involved using his agricultural and entomological training to try to combat crop pests, and he studied beetles in his spare time.

In April–June 1915 Corporaal collected several weevils from the family Anthribidae which he sent for identification to Karl Jordan at the Tring Museum in Hertfordshire, U.K.

Corporaal suffered from a period of ill-health circa 1915 which caused him to return to the Netherlands where he met his future wife, Annie van Rienderhoff. They were married at Penang. Malaysia on 22 August 1917. Corporaal had a five-year contract to work as an entomologist at the Dutch rubber-planter research station near Medan, Sumatra [Algemeene Vereeniging van Rubberplanters ter Oostkust van Sumatra (A.V.R.O.S.)]. After Corporaal's contract ended in 1921 he and Annie returned to the Netherlands, settling in Amsterdam, where Corporaal took a job as an entomological curator at the Amsterdam Zoological Museum.

In 1928 Corporaal attended the fourth International Congress of Entomology in Ithaca, New York as a representative of the Amsterdam Zoological Museum and the Netherlands. He appears as attendee number 51 in the official Congress photograph.

Corporaal built up a personal collection of Cleridae specimens during his career which contained 1200 different types and forms, with around 17,000 specimens in total. After his death these were donated to the Amsterdam Zoological Museum.

== Select publications ==
- Corporaal, J.B. "Notes systématiques et synonymiques sur les Clérides (2me communication sur les Clérides)", Tijdschrift voor Entomologie, volume 67, pages 195-196 (1924)
- Corporaal, J.B.: "Remarks on some South African Cleridae in the British Museum (7th communication on Cleridae)", Tijdschrift voor Entomologie, volume 69, pages 318-319 (1926)
- Corporaal, J.B.: "Further notes on Cleridae. (11th communication on Cleridae)", Tijdschrift voor Entomologie, volume 76, pages 155-188 (1933)
- Corporaal, J.B.: "Notes on some Cleridae in the Hamburg Zoological Museum (21st Communication on Cleridae)", Tijdschrift voor Entomologie, volume 84, pages 359-361 (1941)
