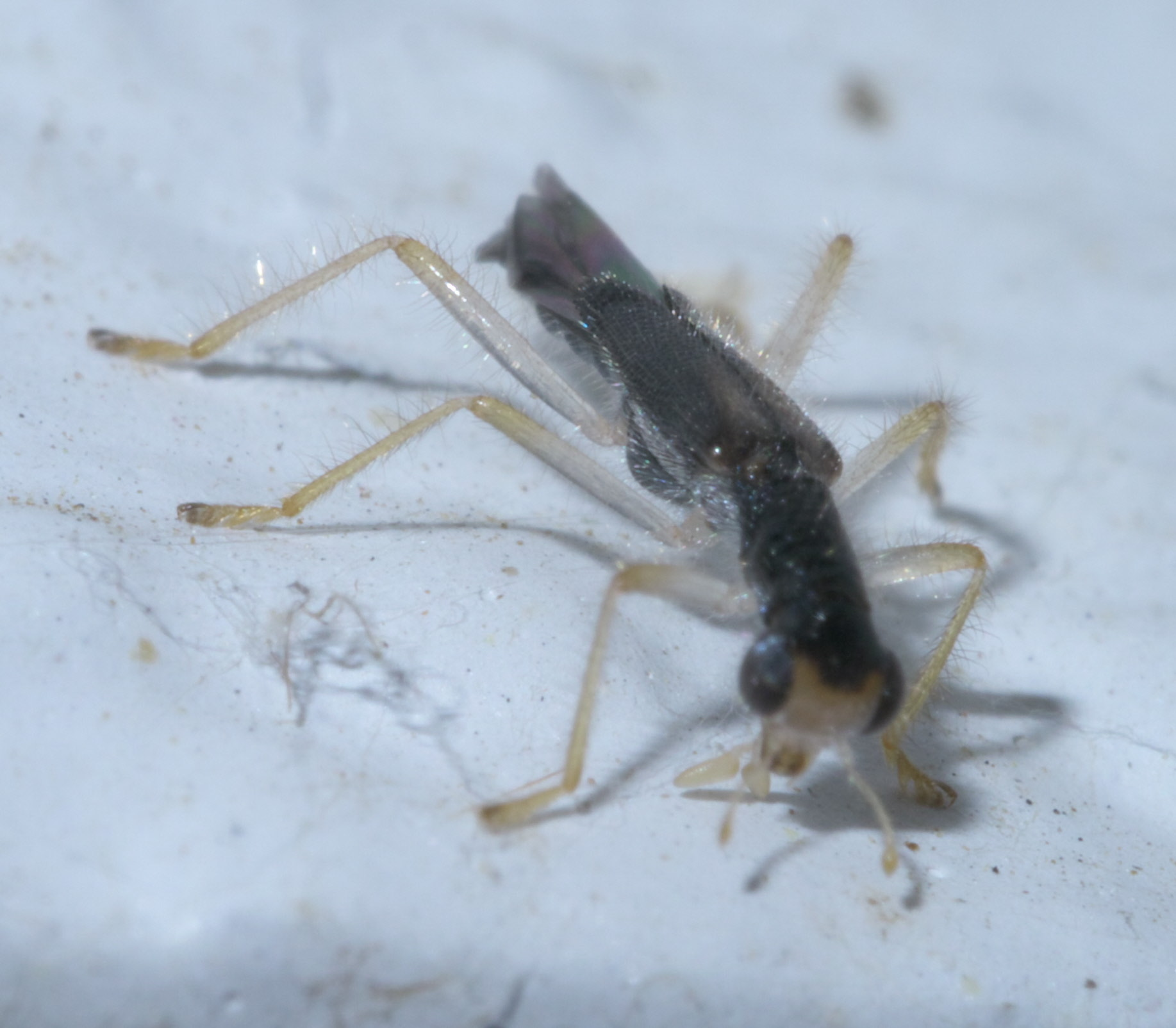
- Isohydnocera curtipennis

Scientific classification
- Kingdom: Animalia
- Phylum: Arthropoda
- Clade: Pancrustacea
- Class: Insecta
- Order: Coleoptera
- Suborder: Polyphaga
- Infraorder: Cucujiformia
- Family: Cleridae
- Subfamily: Hydnocerinae; Spinola, 1844

= Hydnocerinae =

Subfamily of beetles

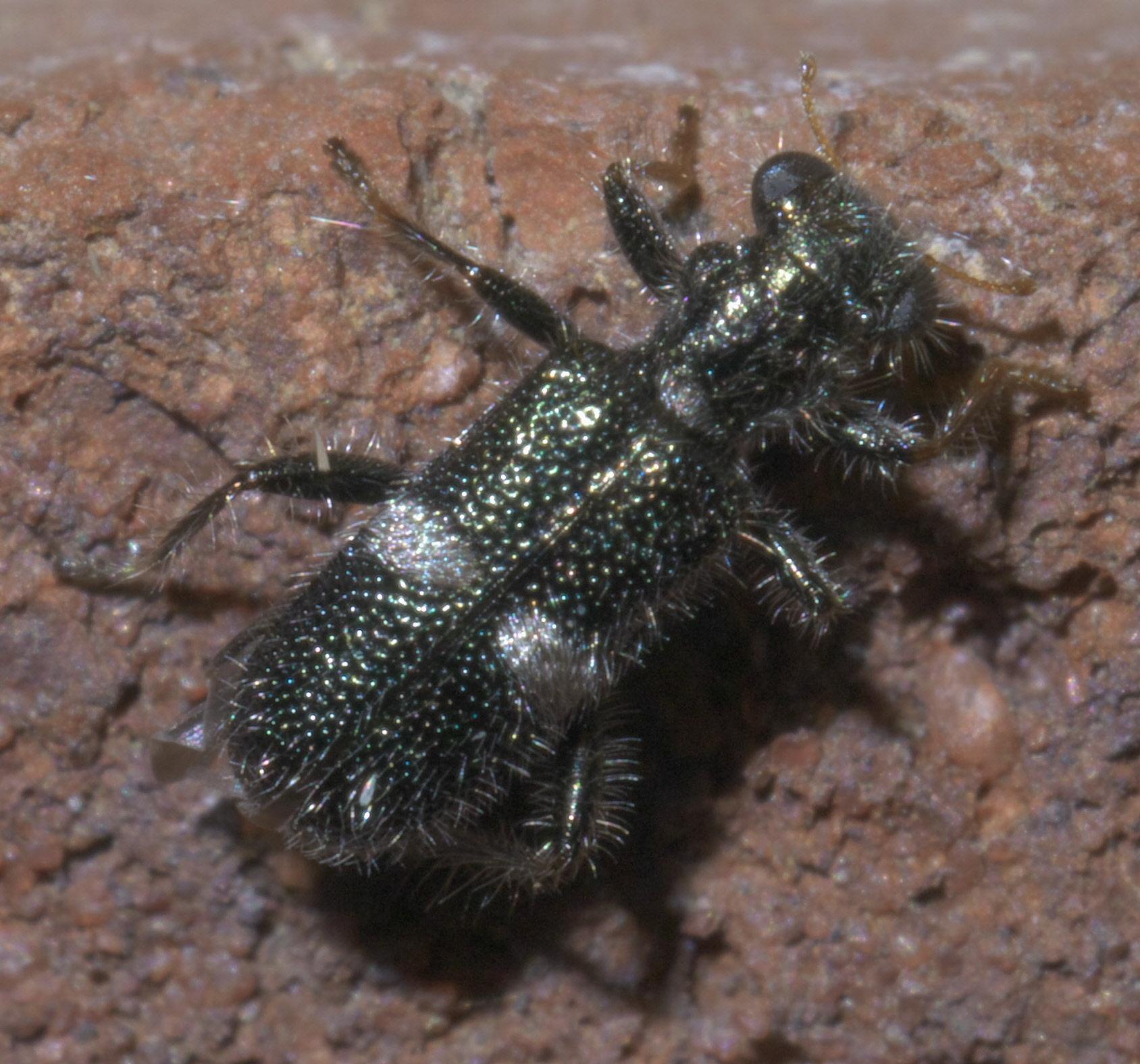
Phyllobaenus unifasciatus

Hydnocerinae is a subfamily of beetles in the family Cleridae. There are at least 70 described species in Hydnocerinae.

== Genera ==
- Isohydnocera Chapin, 1917
- Phyllobaenus Dejean, 1837
- Wolcottia Chapin, 1917
