= General Association of Rubber Planters on the East Coast of Sumatra =

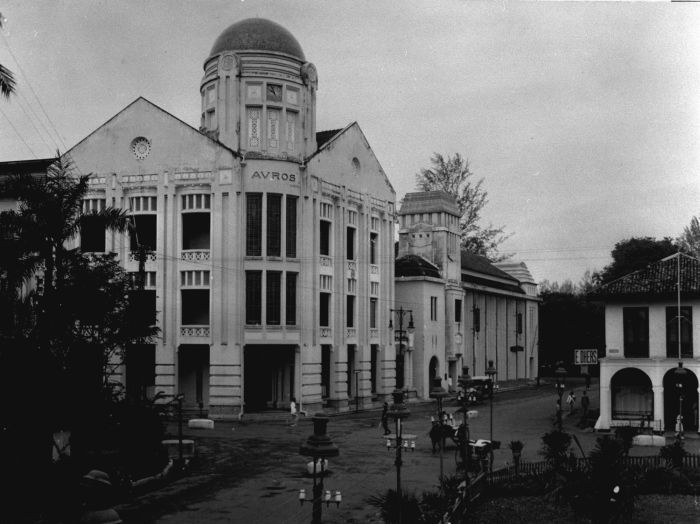
A.V.R.O.S. office in Medan (1920s)

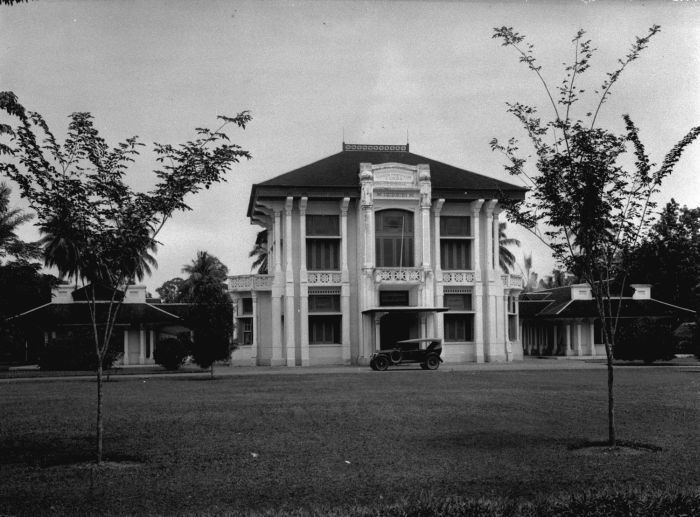
A.V.R.O.S. research station in Kampong Baroe (Baru village)

The General Association of Rubber Planters on the East Coast of Sumatra, Dutch: Algemeene Vereeniging van Rubberplanters ter Oostkust van Sumatra (A.V.R.O.S.), was a Dutch agricultural research station organization based near Medan, Sumatra in the Dutch East Indies. A.V.R.O.S. has an office building in Medan and a research station in "Kampong Baroe" (Baru) near Medan. A.V.R.O.S. conducted and published research on commercial plantings.

In 1967, the name changed into BKS-PPS (Badan Kerja Sama Perusahaan Perkebunan Sumatera, Sumatra Plantation Companies Partnership Board).

== Gallery ==
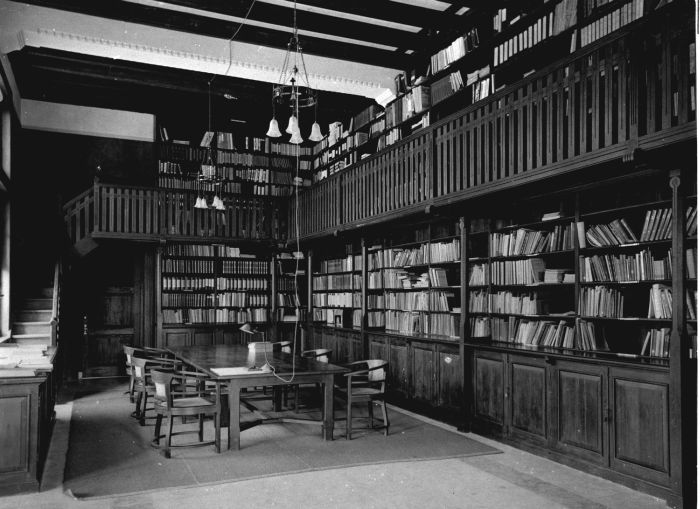
The library at the A.V.R.O.S. experimental station circa 1925

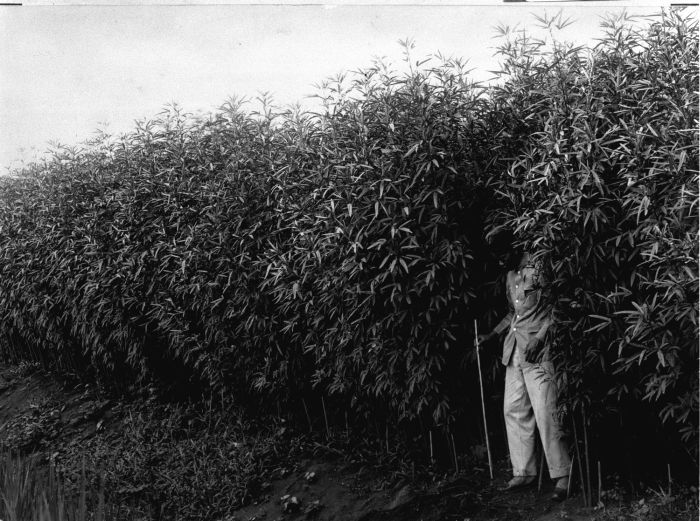
Roselle Hibiscus sabdariffa crop at the field station of the AVROS

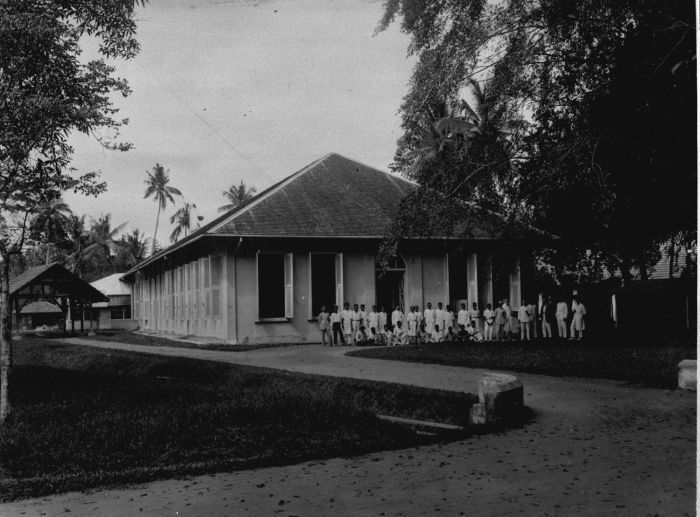
Pathology lab at the field station

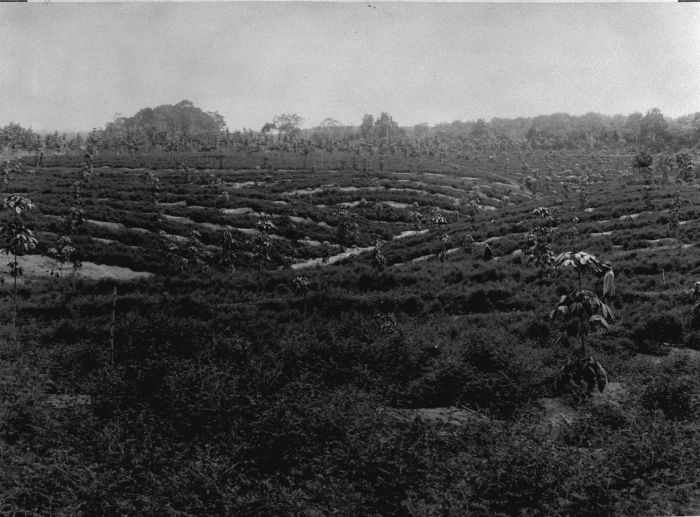
Field crops

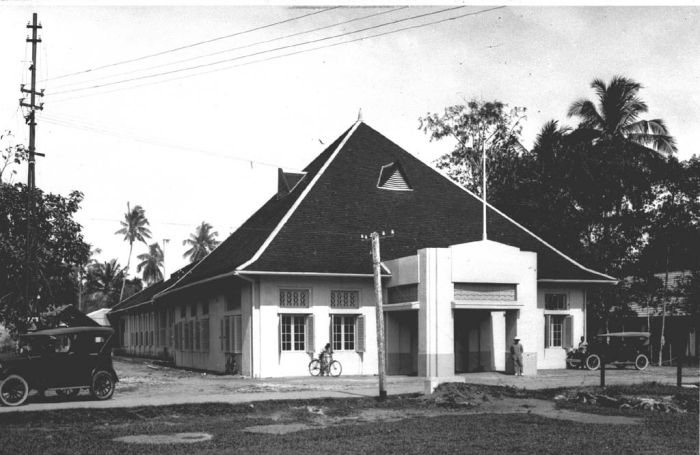
Pathology lab

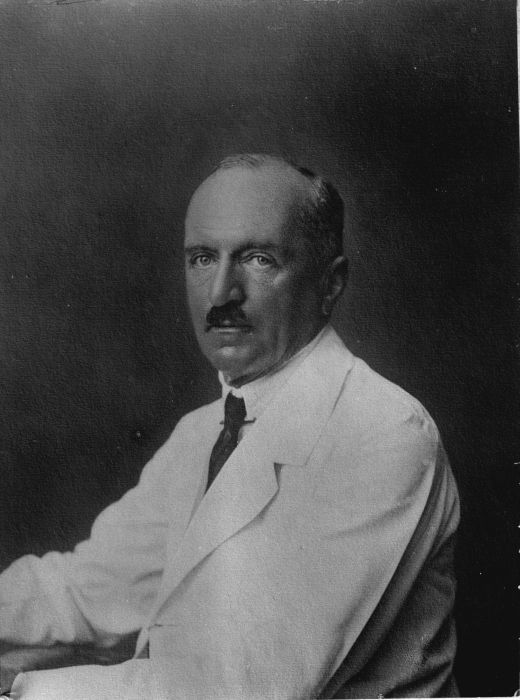

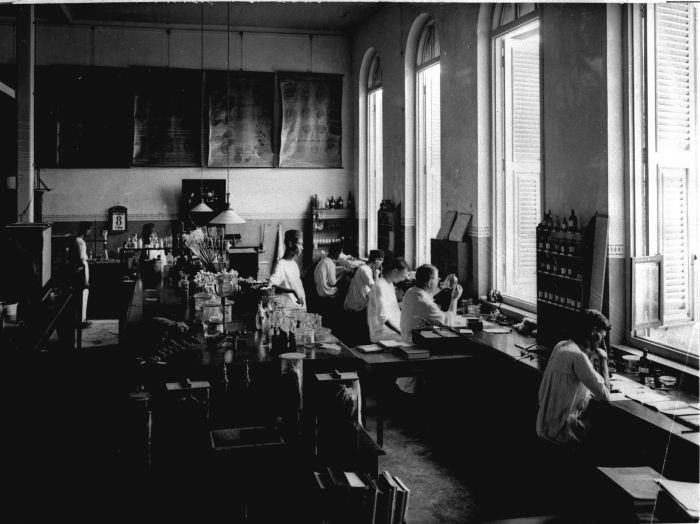
Workers at the pathology lab

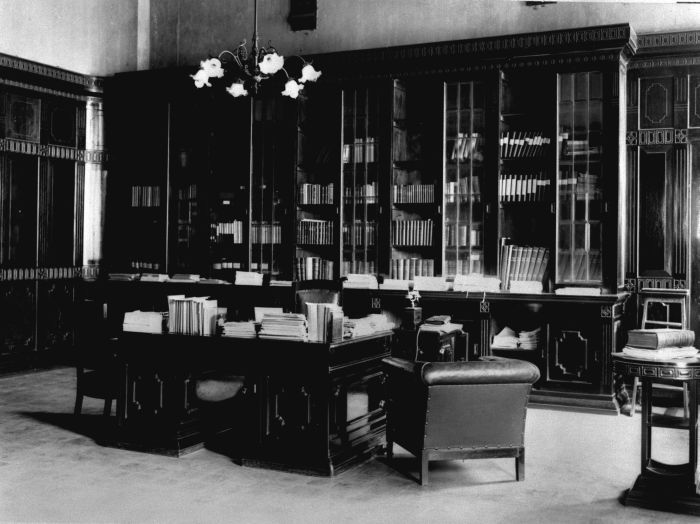
