= Corinthiscus =

Scientific classification
- Kingdom: Animalia
- Phylum: Arthropoda
- Class: Insecta
- Order: Coleoptera
- Suborder: Polyphaga
- Infraorder: Cucujiformia
- Family: Cleridae
- Subfamily: Enopliinae
- Genus: Corinthiscus; Fairmaire & Germain, 1861

Genus of beetles

Corinthiscus is a genus of beetles in the subfamily Clerinae, it was first documented by Fairmaire & Germain.

== Species ==
- Corinthiscus insignicornis Fairmaire & Germain, 1861
- Corinthiscus peninsularis Schaeffer, 1917
- Corinthiscus denticollis
