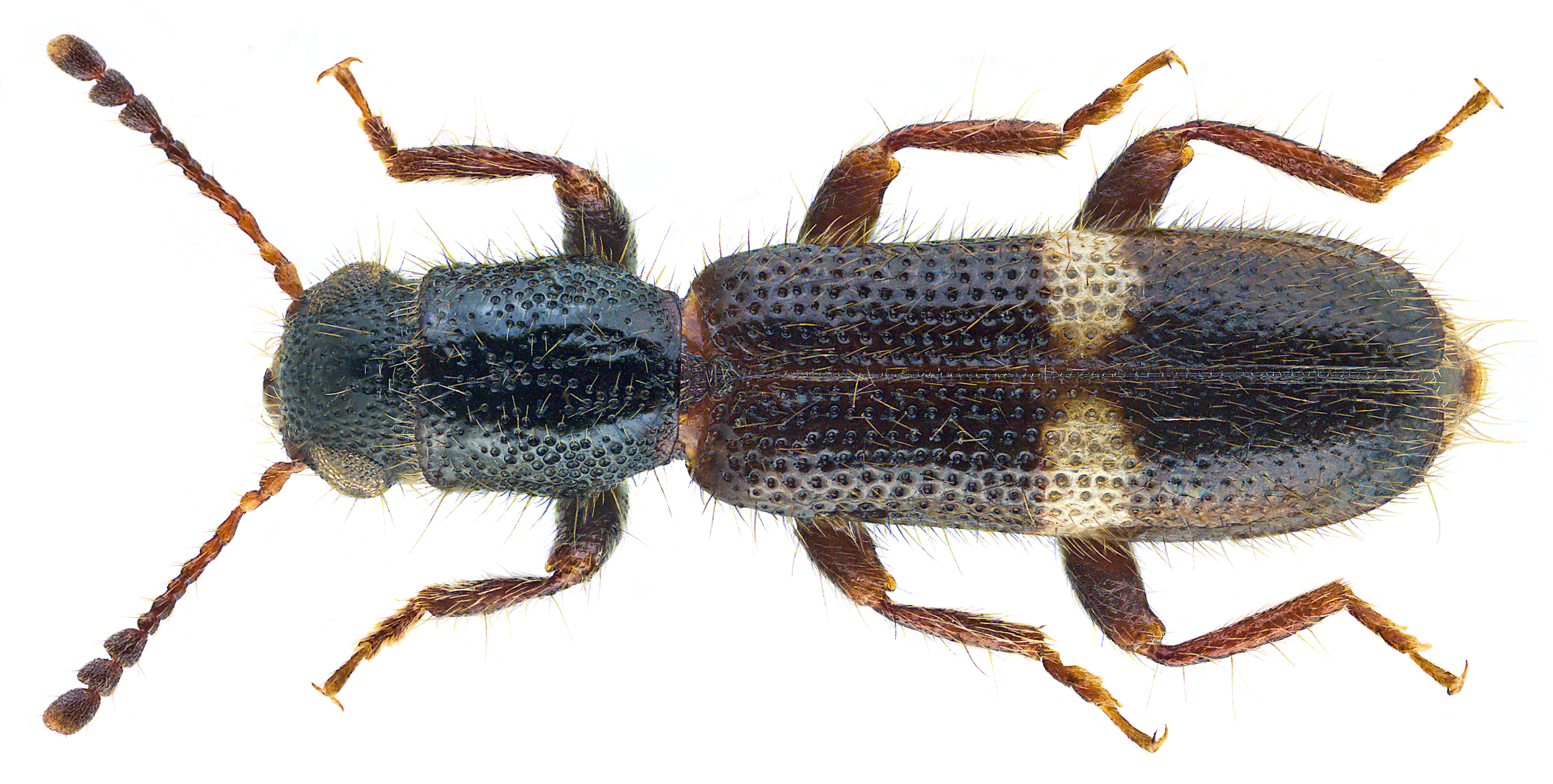
- Tarsostenus univittatus

Scientific classification
- Kingdom: Animalia
- Phylum: Arthropoda
- Class: Insecta
- Order: Coleoptera
- Suborder: Polyphaga
- Infraorder: Cucujiformia
- Family: Cleridae
- Subfamily: Tarsosteninae
- Genus: Tarsostenus; Spinola, 1844

= Tarsostenus =

Genus of beetles

Tarsostenus is a genus of checkered beetles in the family Cleridae. It includes the cosmopolitan species T. univittatus.

== Description ==
Tarsostenus are oblong beetles 3.5–8.0 mm long and 1.0–2.0 mm wide. They can be recognised by a distinctly oblong pronotum with glabrous streaks on the disc and without lateral tubercles, the elytral disc with 10 rows of punctations, and the unguis lacking a denticle.

Several species within the genus have a transverse white band halfway along the elytra.

== Ecology ==
Based on those species whose ecology is known, Tarsostenus are predators on wood-boring beetles.

For example, T. univittatus preys on bostrichids (Lyctus, Sinoxylon, Xylobiops and Trogoxylon) and anobiines. It has been found in borer-infested lumber and wooden furniture from a range of different trees: ash, hickory, persimmon, white oak, Vahellia tortilis (=Acacia tortilis) Hayne raddiana, pecan, Cercis siliquastrum, Corymbia maculata (=Eucalyptus maculata), Ficus retusa, Schinus terebinthifolius and Triplochiton sclerodendron.

Tarsostenus hilaris has been collected from Eucalyptus "laden with various species of cerambycids".

The holotype of T. kanak was collected by beating unspecified vegetation in a rainforest.

== Species ==
Listed below are the species of Tarsostenus, along with their distributions:

- Tarsostenus antehelvis Optiz, 2016 - Papua New Guinea
- Tarsostenus bicolor Optiz, 2016 - New Caledonia
- Tarsostenus hilaris (Westwood, 1849) - Australia
- Tarsostenus kanak Optiz, 2016 - New Caledonia
- Tarsostenus tricolor (Heller, 1916) - New Caledonia
- Tarsostenus univittatus Rossi, 1972 - Cosmopolitan

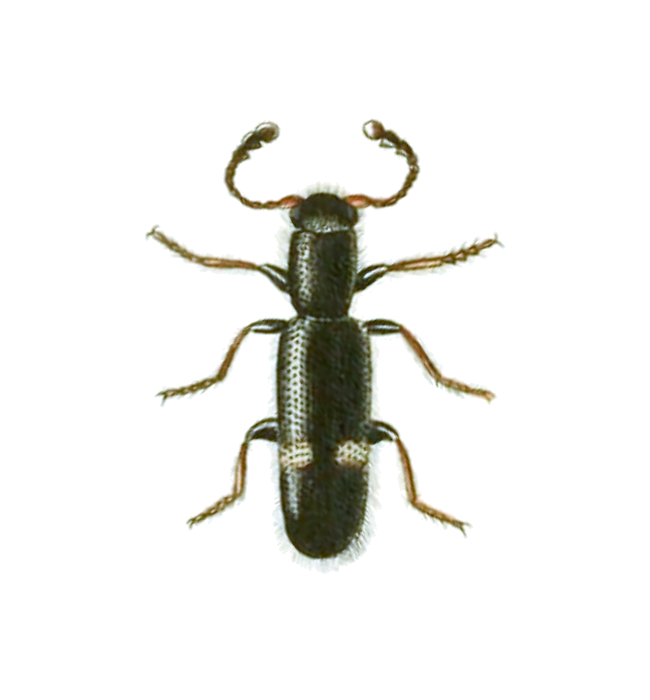
Tarsostenus univittatus
