= Opetiopalpus =

Scientific classification
- Kingdom: Animalia
- Phylum: Arthropoda
- Class: Insecta
- Order: Coleoptera
- Suborder: Polyphaga
- Infraorder: Cucujiformia
- Family: Cleridae
- Genus: Opetiopalpus; Spinola, 1844

Genus of beetles

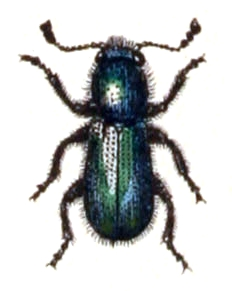
Opetiopalpus scutellaris, from Calwer's Käferbuch, Table 28, Picture 16.

Opetiopalpus is a genus of beetles belonging to the family Cleridae.

Species:

- Opetiopalpus scutellaris (Panzer, 1797)
