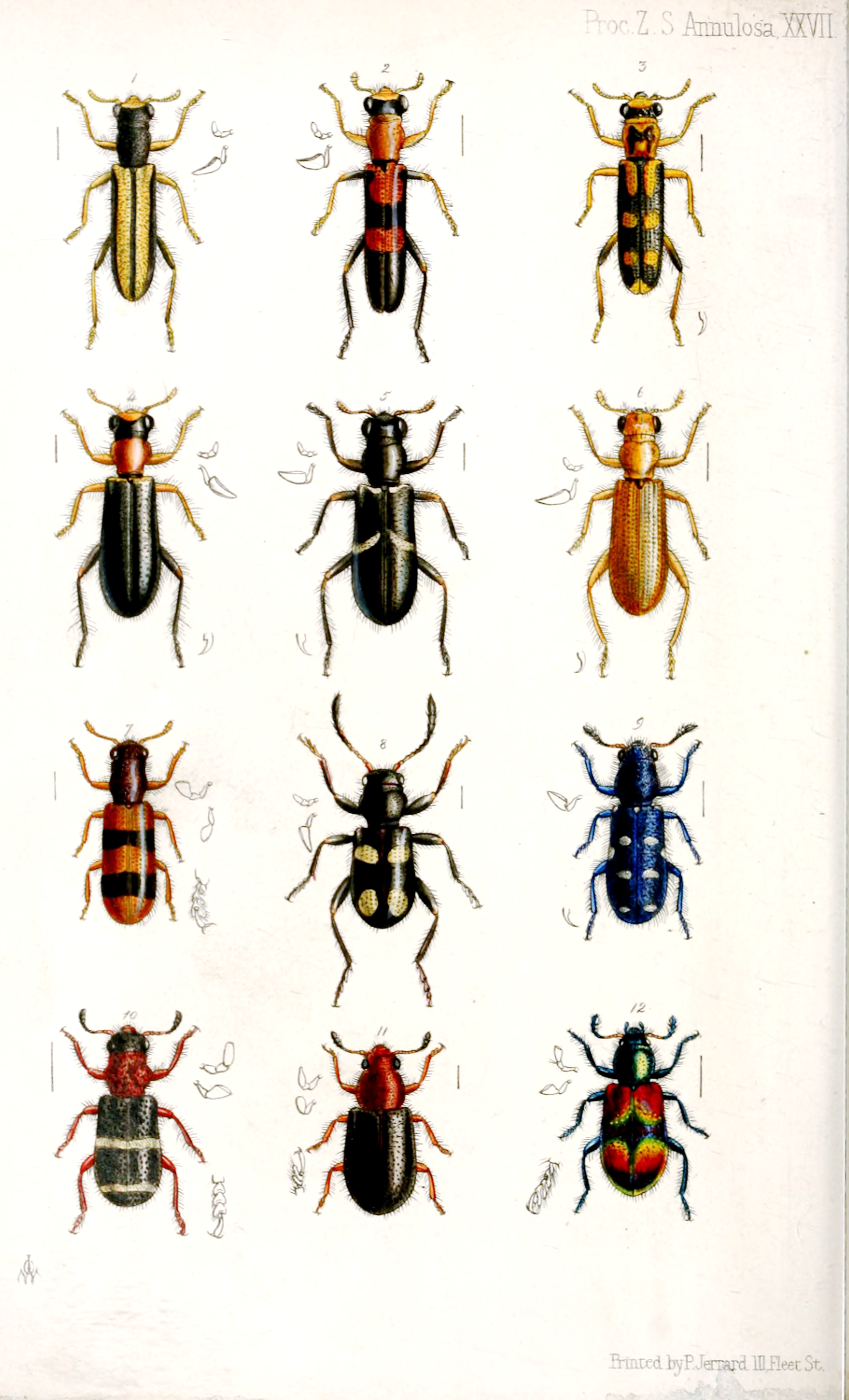
- Some checkered beetles described in the mid-19th century

Scientific classification
- Kingdom: Animalia
- Phylum: Arthropoda
- Class: Insecta
- Order: Coleoptera
- Suborder: Polyphaga
- Infraorder: Cucujiformia
- Superfamily: Cleroidea
- Family: Cleridae; Latreille, 1802

Subfamilies
- Clerinae Latreille, 1802; Enopliinae Gistel, 1856 (disputed); Epiphloeinae Gistel, 1856 (disputed); Hydnocerinae Spinola, 1844; Korynetinae Laporte, 1836; Tarsosteninae Jacquelin du Val, 1861 (disputed); Thaneroclerinae Chapin, 1921 (but see text); Tillinae Leach, 1815 and see below

= Cleridae =

Cleridae Temporal range: Middle Jurassic–Recent

Checkered beetles

Cleridae are a family of beetles of the superfamily Cleroidea. They are commonly known as checkered beetles. The family Cleridae has a worldwide distribution, and a variety of habitats and feeding preferences.

Cleridae have many niches and feeding habits. Most genera are predaceous and feed on other beetles and larvae; however other genera are scavengers or pollen feeders. Clerids have elongated bodies with bristly hairs, are usually bright colored, and have variable antennae. Checkered beetles range in length between 3 and 24 millimetres (0.12 and 0.94 in). Cleridae can be identified based on their 5–5–5 tarsal formula, division of sternites, and the absence of a special type of vesicle. Female Cleridae lay between 28–42 eggs at a time predominately under the bark of trees. Larvae are predaceous and feed vigorously before pupation and subsequently emergence as adults.

Clerids have a minor significance in forensic entomology. Some species are occasionally found on carrion in the later dry stages of decay. Also, some species are pests (stored product entomology) and are found infesting various food products. Research efforts related to Cleridae have focused primarily on using certain species as biological controls. This is a very effective technique for controlling bark beetles due to the voracious appetite of many clerid species.

== Description ==
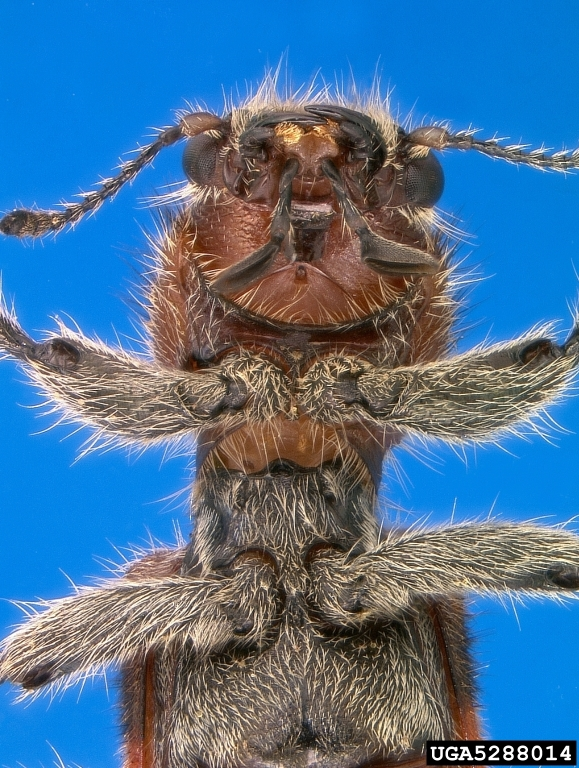
Narrow pronotum in Enoclerus ichneumoneus (Clerinae)

=== Appearance ===
Generally, checkered beetles are elongated and oval in shape and range from 3–24 millimetres (0.12–0.94 in) in length. Their entire bodies are covered with bristly hairs and many display an ornate body color pattern. These often brightly color patterns can be red, yellow, orange, or blue. The antennae are clubbed at the tip for most species, but others can be "clubbed, saw-tooth, or thread-like." The pronotum region is nearly cylindrical and characteristically narrower than the elytra (special hardened front wings), while the head is as wide or wider than the pronotum. Their elytra have tiny pits or depressions, and never expose more than two tergites (dorsal plates).

=== Identification ===
Clerid beetles fall under the suborder Polyphaga. Key characteristics of Polyphaga are that the hind coxa (base of the leg), do not divide the first and second abdominal/ventral plates which are known as sternites. Also, the notopleural suture (found under the pronotal shield) is not present. To further identify Clerid beetles, a few additional characteristics need to be examined.

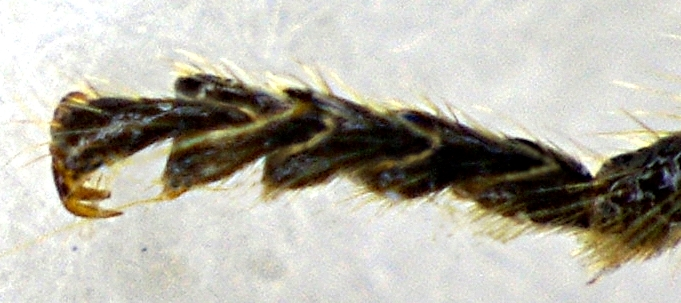
Five rear leg tarsomeres of Tillus elongatus (Tillinae)

Clerid beetles have unique legs that help to distinguish them from other families. Their tarsal formula is 5–5–5, meaning that on each of the front, middle and hind legs there are five tarsomeres (individual subsegments of the feet/tarsi). One or more of these subsegments on each leg is typically lobed, and the fourth tarsomere is normally difficult to distinguish. Furthermore, an important feature that eliminates many other families of beetles is that clerids' front coxae (base of the leg) expose the second segment of the legs known as the trochanter.

The second defining characteristic of the family Cleridae is that clerids never have eversible vesicles (small usually hidden balloon-like structures thought to be scent glands) on their abdomen and pronotum. This characteristic distinguishes them from a similar family Melyridae which sometimes has these glands. This trait is very important in correctly differentiating checkered beetles from Melyridae.

== Distribution and ecology ==
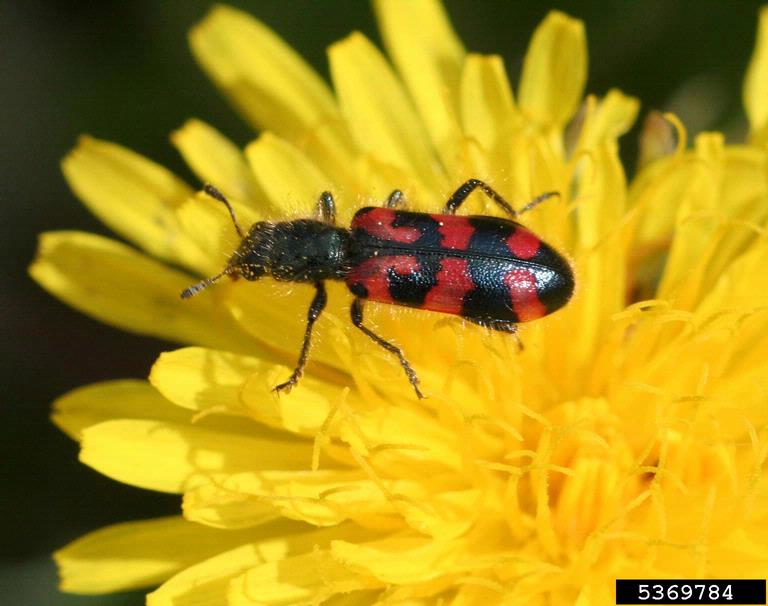
Trichodes ornatus (Clerinae) on a flower

Cleridae can be found in the Americas, Africa, Europe, the Middle East and even in Australia. There are approximately 3,500 species in the world and about 500 species in North America. Due to this wide distribution there are many different habitats in which the checkered beetles can be found.

Many of the species are known as "flower visitors", that prey on other flower visiting insects and also feed on pollen. These species are found in moist, sunny environments where flowering plants are found in abundance.

Another habitat commonly inhabited by clerid beetles is trees. These "tree living species" are found in forests across the world with various climates and an array of easily preyed upon insects. They seek protection under the bark and hunt for other insects above and below the bark. The primary source of prey for these bark living hunters is bark beetles.

The third type of clerid beetles is the "nest robbing species" which live in shrubbery and in trees. Unlike the tree living species, these species do not actually burrow into the bark. Nest robbing species typically hunt termite, bee, and wasp larvae, and one particular species has been noted to prey primarily on grasshopper egg masses. Not all nest robbing species actively hunt live prey, some species for example prefer to feed only on dead honey bee larvae and adults.

=== Feeding habits ===
The Cleridae contains many species of predaceous beetles that feed on other beetles and beetle larvae in their natural habitat. The most common prey item for checkered beetles are bark beetles and wood boring beetles.

In general, the bulk of adult Cleridae feed mainly on other adult beetles while the larvae stage feed on other beetle larvae. Some checkered beetles are known to have an extremely voracious appetite with some larvae able to consume "several times their own body weight" in a day.

Although most species of checkered beetles are predaceous in nature, some are scavengers and others have been found feeding on flower pollen. Because of the checkered beetles predaceous nature and insatiable appetite, they are often key players in the biological control of other insects. The checkered beetles have also developed a unique adaptation to aid in their quest for prey. The beetles use pheromones to help them locate, kill, and consume their prey.

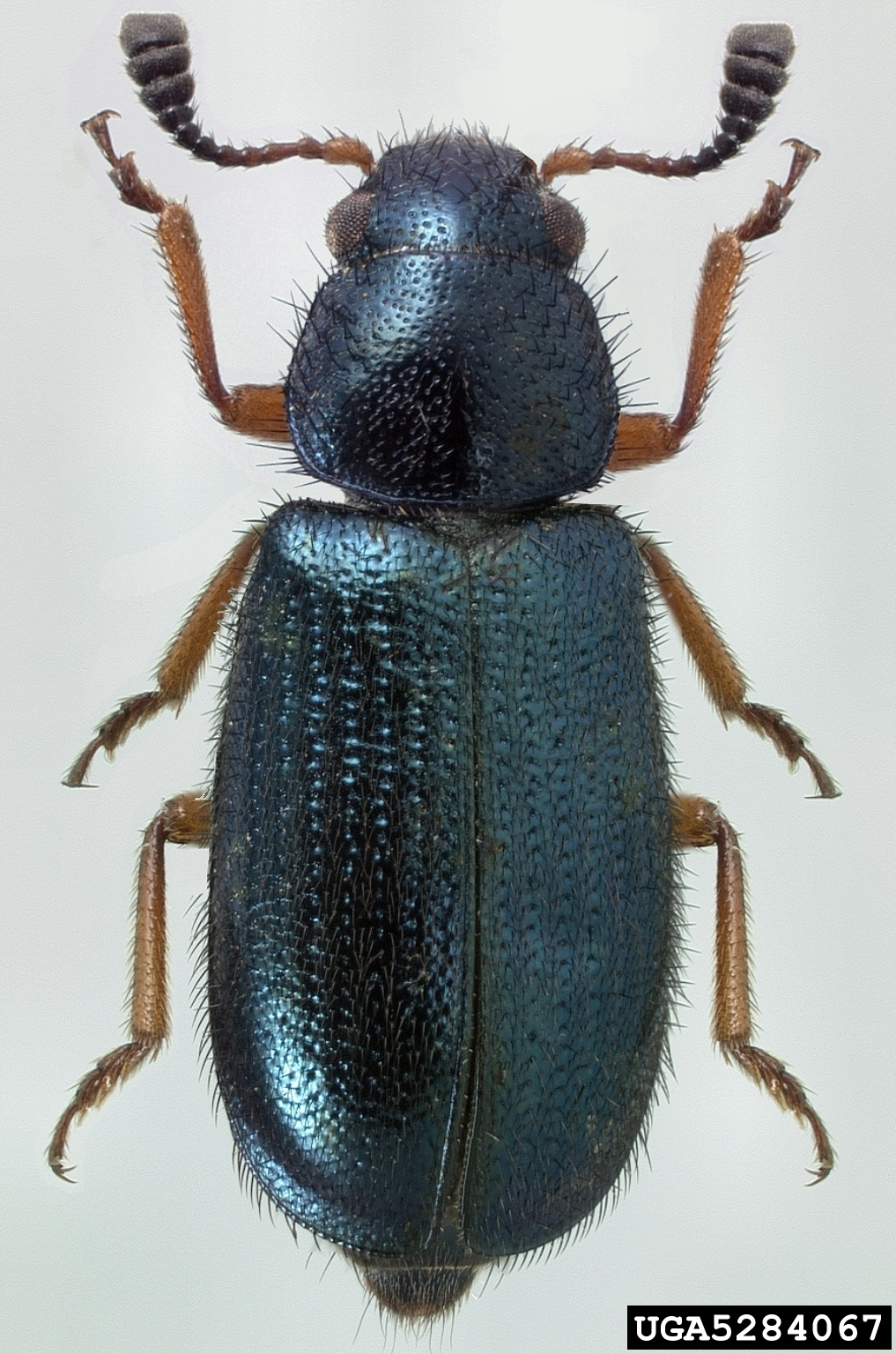
Necrobia rufipes (Korynetinae)

The diversity of checkered beetle's feeding habits is quite evident when different species are examined. Necrobia spp. are attracted to dry carrion and other decomposing animal matter such as bones and skin as well as various meat products. Thanasimus spp. are found in woodland areas where bark beetle species constitute their main source of prey. The primary source of prey for Phyllobaenus spp. are wood borers, immature weevils, and hymenoptera larvae. One of the more diverse genera is Trichodes, in which larvae feed on the pollen of flowering plants and adults prey upon grasshoppers and wasps.

=== Life cycle ===
The general life cycle of clerids has been known to last anywhere from 35 days to more than 3 years, and is strongly dependent on the life cycle of their prey. While the life cycle can vary in length between genus and species, temperature is also a major determinant in the length of time spent in each stage of development. The warmer the temperature is, the quicker the life cycle, and the cooler the temperature is the slower the life cycle. If temperatures dip below a threshold temperature for an extended period of time, clerids and most other insects will have growth and developmental progress arrested. Like all beetles, Cleridae follow a holometabolous life cycle: the egg hatches into a larva, which grows and feeds, changing its skin to form a pupa, and the pupa shedding its skin to emerge as an adult. The larvae of the majority of the known species of Cleridae feed upon the eggs and young of wood-boring beetles, while the adults feed on the adult bark beetles.

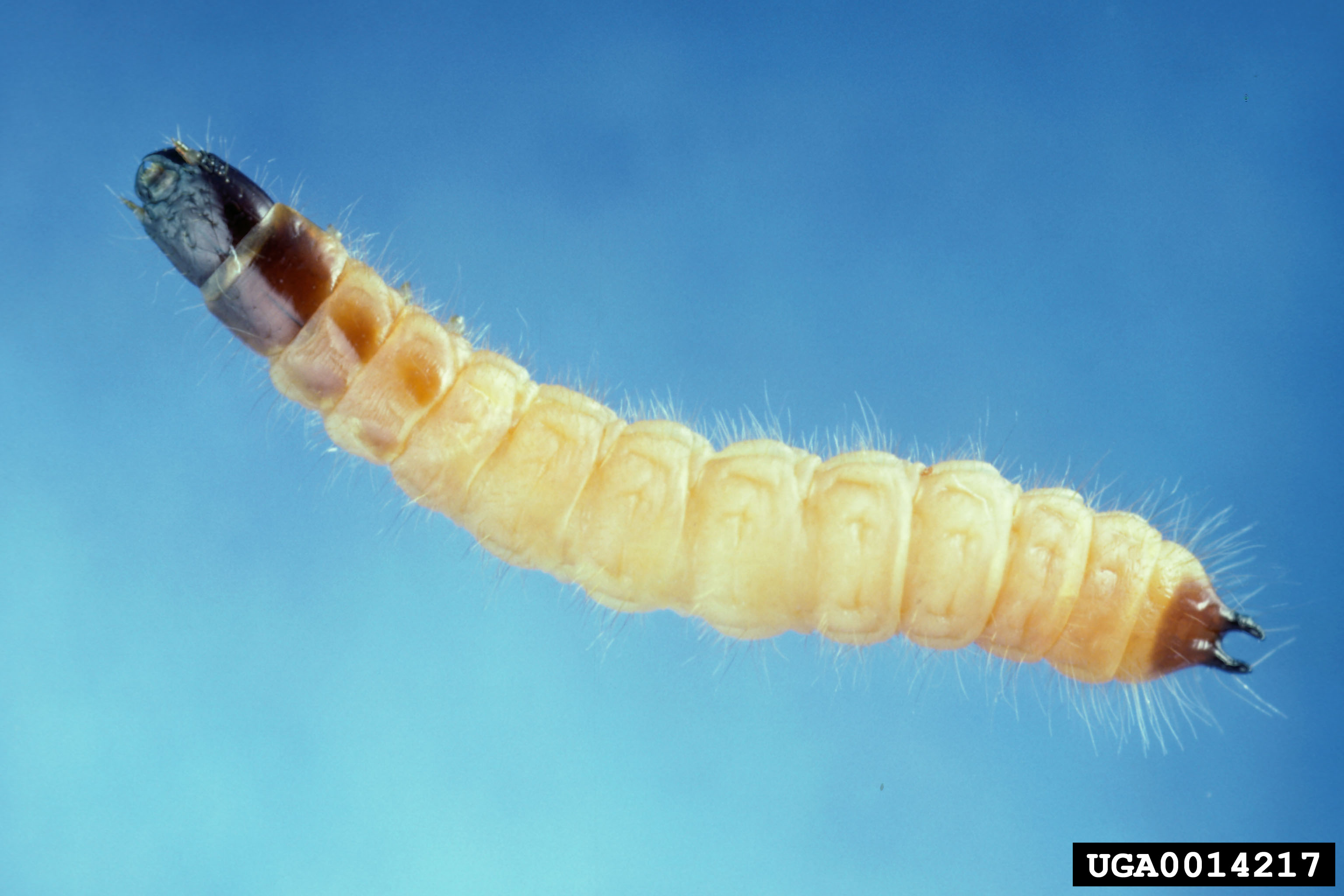
Larva of Thanasimus dubius

Copulation takes place while the female feeds, because females need a large amount of food for egg development. The female lays her eggs 36–72 hours after copulation. The eggs are laid in between pieces of bark on wood-borer-infested trees or under stones in the soil. She may lay 28–42 eggs at a time. For the longer-living species such as Thanasimus, this occurs in late summer or early fall to give the larvae enough time for proper growth before having to overwinter.

When larvae hatch from their eggs, they are either red or yellow. Their bodies have a slender and flat appearance with short legs due to their minimal movement. The larvae are covered in hair and have two horn-type projections on the dorsal area of the last body segment. Immediately after birth, they start searching for food close to where they hatched. They feed on wood-borer insects on trees, or feed on their species' substrate or prey of choice. Feeding is the main purpose of the larval stage to prepare for pupation. Once their larval stage is complete the tree dwelling species make their way to the bottom of the tree to pupate. The pupal stage can last from 6 weeks to one year depending on the need to overwinter, and how short the overall life cycle is for a particular species. A majority of clerid species pupate in earthen cells which are made from soil and certain enzymes secreted from their mouths. The rest remain in pupal cells. Adult beetles emerge from pupation and spend a variable time of their life maturing, and eventually oviposit. Sexually mature adults or imagos of Thanasiumus overwinter inside the wood-borer-infested trees and oviposit during the spring.

== Forensic relevance ==
=== Stored product entomology ===
Necrobia rufipes, commonly known as the red-legged ham beetle, is of particular importance in stored product entomology. It infests dried or smoked meats, especially those products that are stored unwrapped for long periods of time. Adults feed on the surface of the products, while the larvae damage the meat by boring down usually in the fatty parts. Necrobia rufipes has been recorded feeding upon a large variety of items ranging from hides and dried figs to Egyptian mummies. In addition, products such as wool and silk can become infested, but not destroyed.

=== Medico-legal entomology ===
Since clerids are predaceous in nature, they have been found feeding on fly larvae as well as the skin and bones of carrion. Most clerids are not useful in forensics because of their food choice, but some species such as Necrobia rufipes can be useful. Necrobia rufipes is attracted towards carrion in the later stages of decomposition, so its arrival on carrion can help provide an estimate for the post-mortem interval or PMI. Although the checkered beetle is not the most significant insect on carrion, the beetle's predaceous nature and its ability to reproduce in carrion that is exposed to the environment provides some forensic importance.

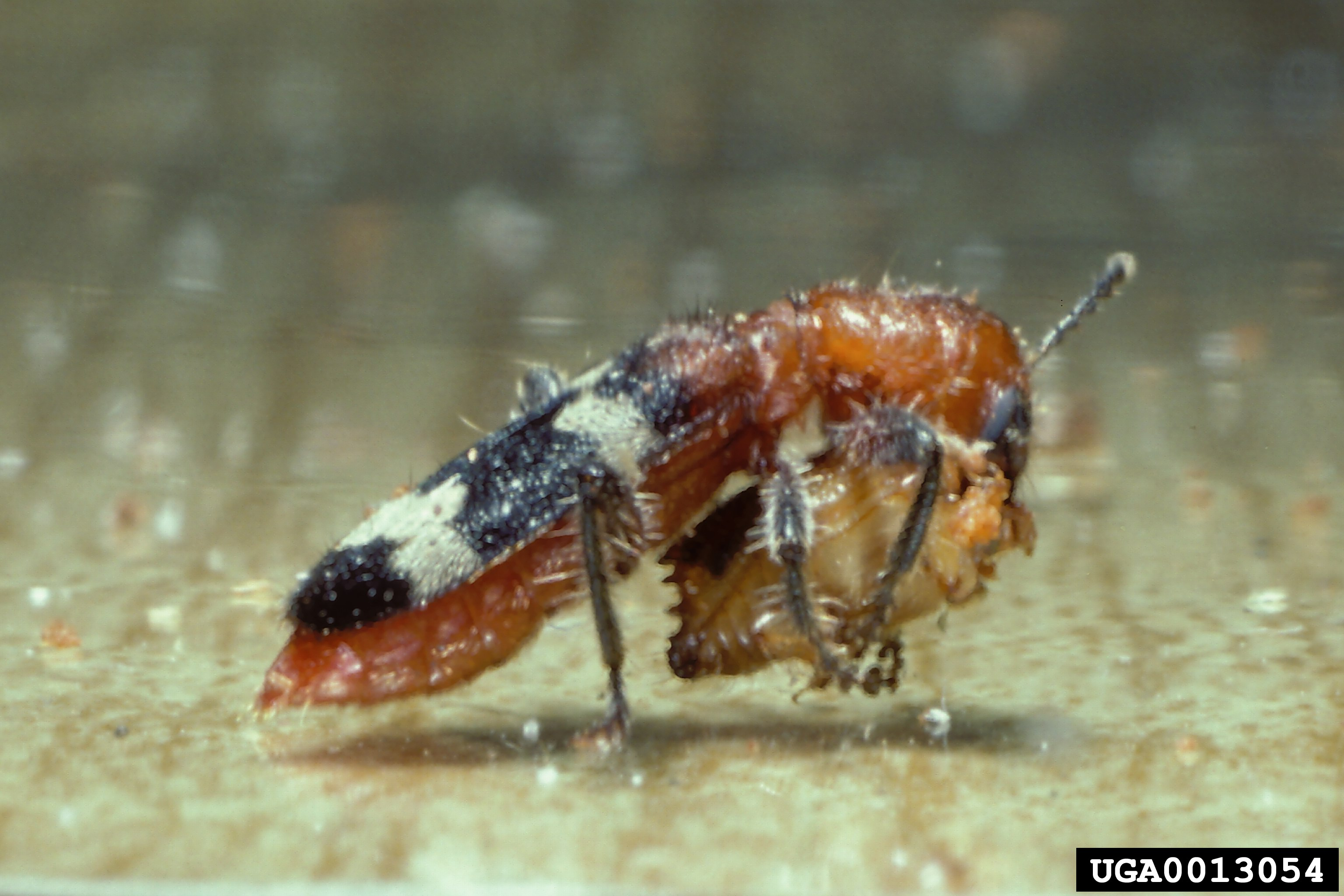
Thanasimus dubius attacking bark beetle prey

== Ongoing research ==
There is ongoing research with some clerid species. Forensic research is limited because of their late arrival on carrion, but members such as Thanasimus undatulus have been researched as a possible role in integrated pest management or IPM. Thanasimus undatulus is a predator of bark beetles. Some species of bark beetles such as the southern pine beetle and the mountain pine beetle can become pests to the lumber industry because in large numbers they can cause damage and kill live trees. Thanasimus undatulus has been researched as a possible biological control agent for these pests. Researchers and forestry officials have used bark beetle aggregation pheromones to attract the checkered beetle to specific trees. This causes the bark beetles to be overwhelmed, extensively preyed upon by the clerid beetles, and typically eliminated. There is also additional research being done pertaining to the impact of clerids on pollination in flowers.

== Systematics ==
The genera of Cleridae are divided among several subfamilies, though some genera still defy easy classification. Several taxonomic schemes exist, recognizing for example a group around Neorthopleura as distinct subfamily Neorthopleurinae, or splitting off the Thaneroclerinae as distinct family, or circumscribing the Korynetinae sensu stricto or sensu lato. The following list of tribes and selected genera is thus preliminary. Some notable species are also listed. The oldest members of the family are Protoclerus and Wangweiella the late Middle Jurassic (Callovian) Daohugou bed in Inner Mongolia, China.

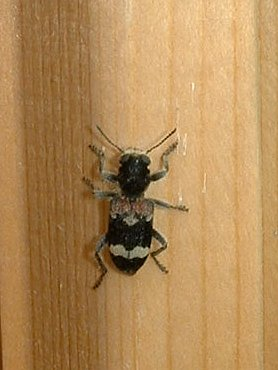
Clerus mutillarius (Clerinae)

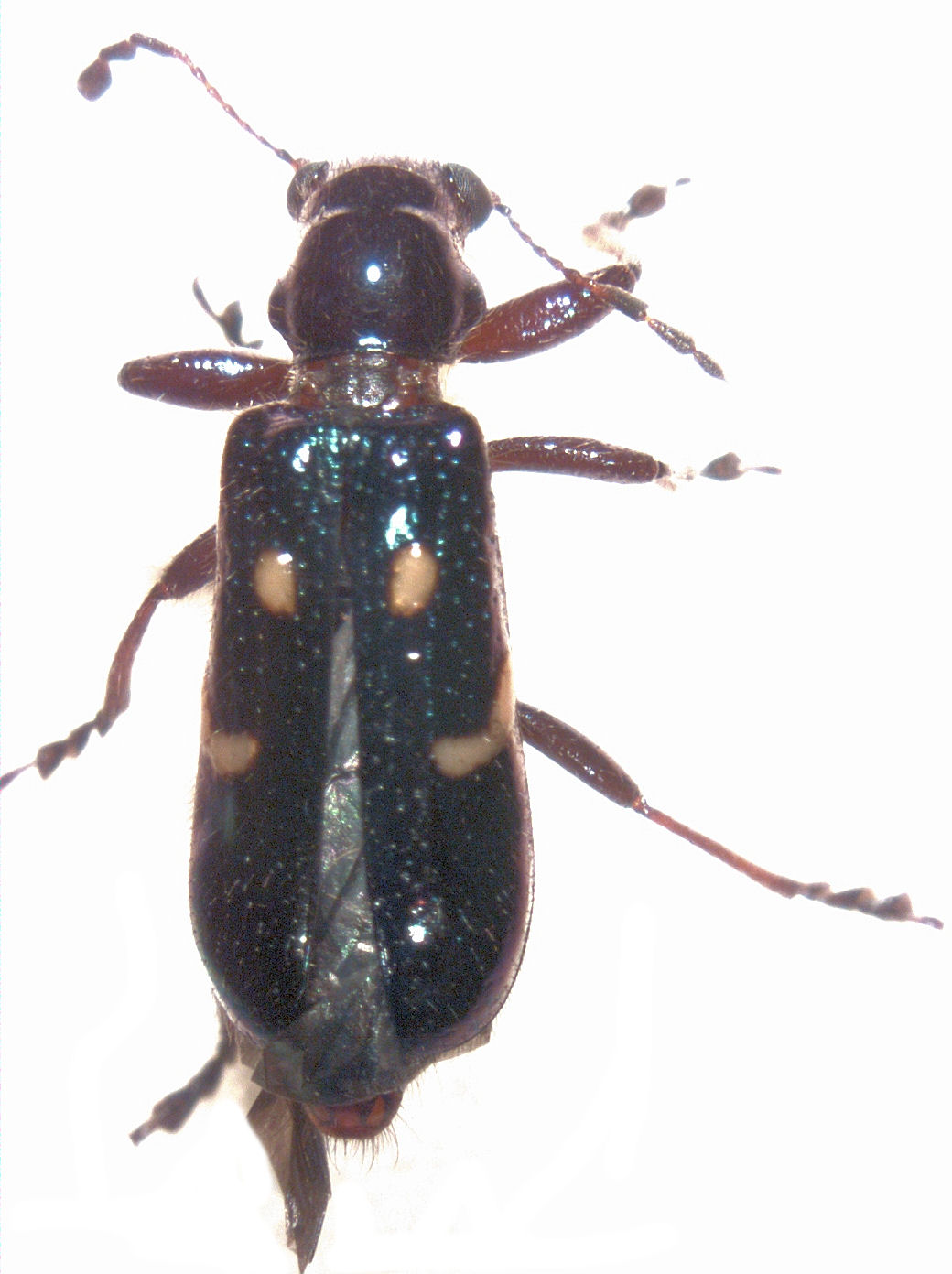
Phymatophaea guttigera (Enopliinae)

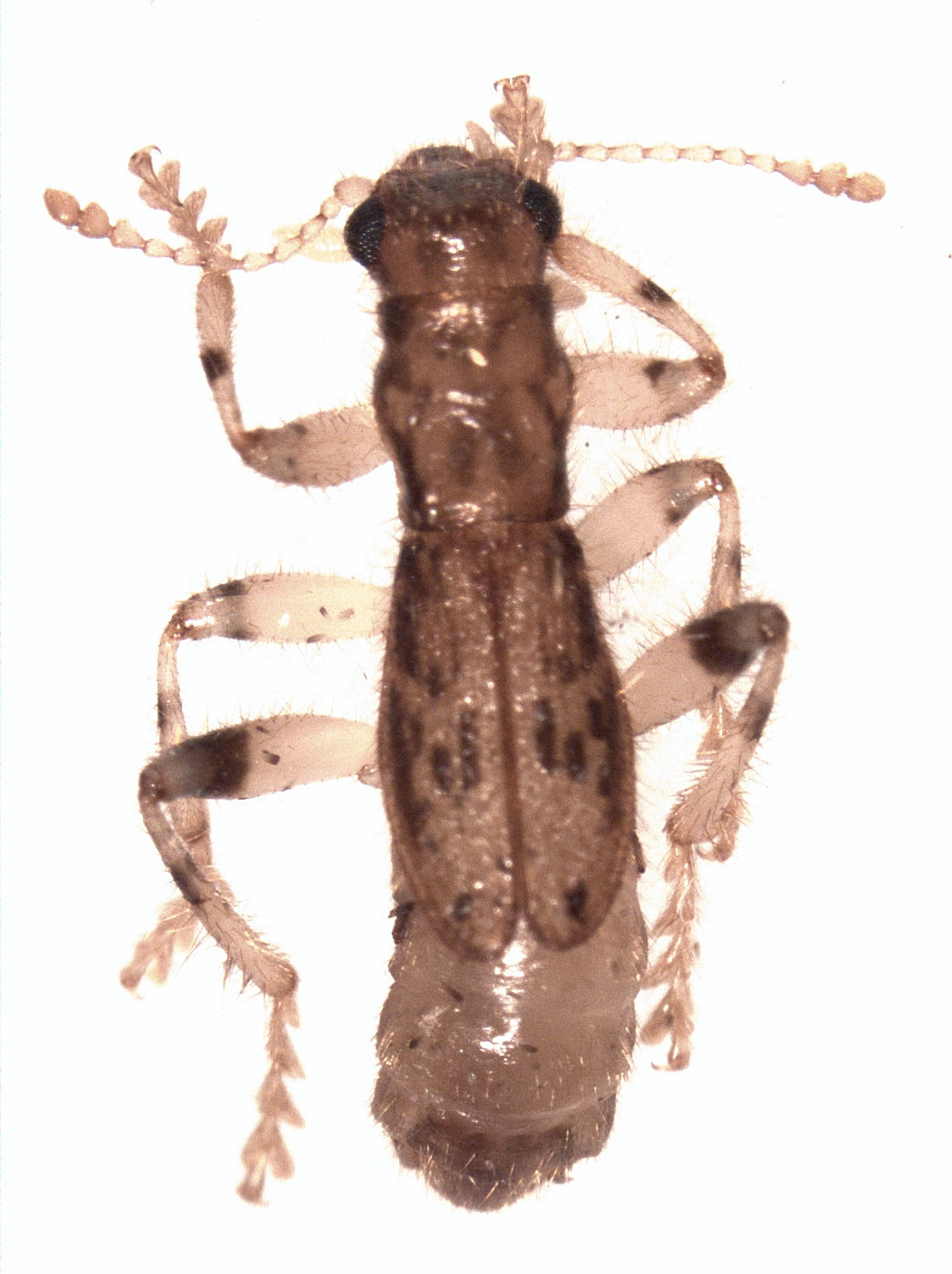
Lemidia aptera (Hydnocerinae)

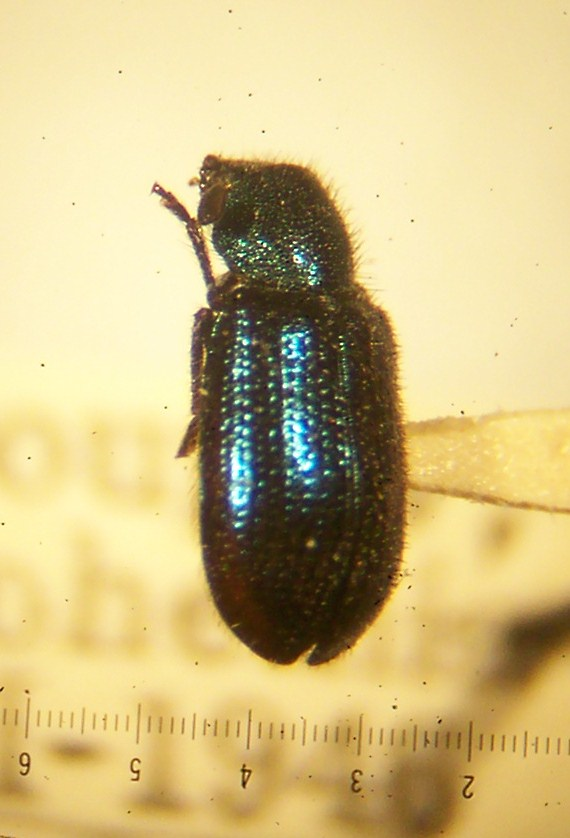
Necrobia violacea (Korynetinae)

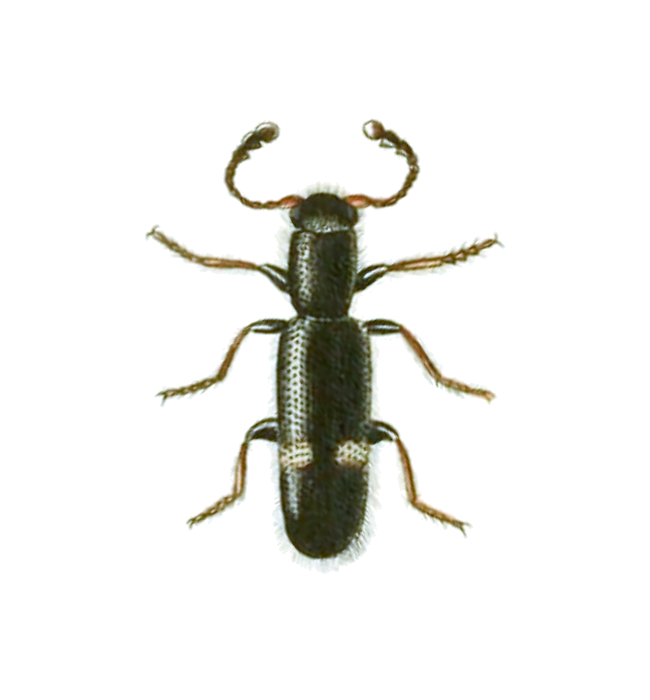
Tarsostenus univittatus (Tarsosteninae)

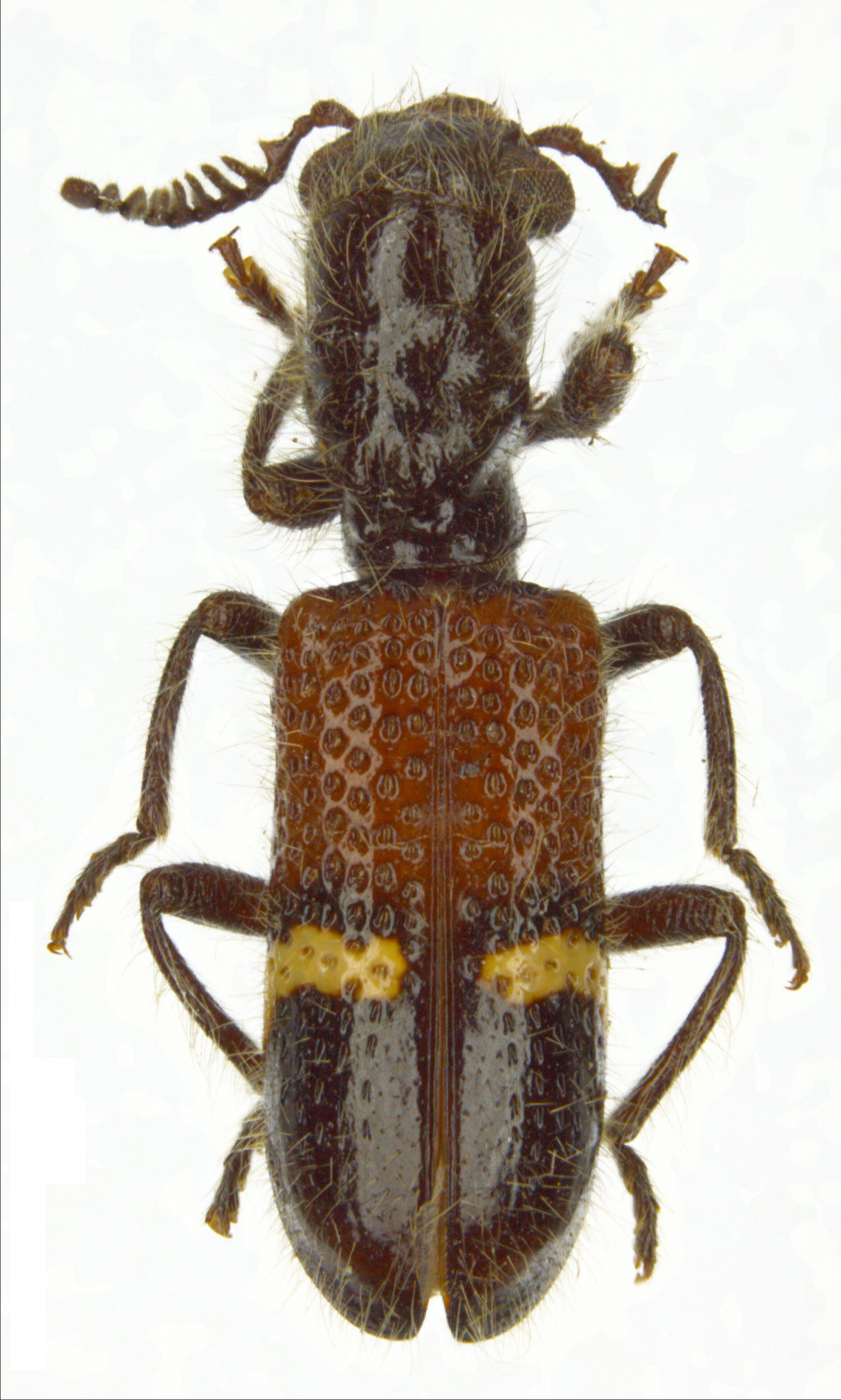
Diplocladus kuwerti (Tillinae)

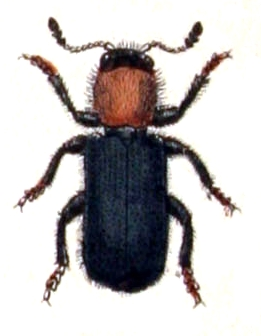
Dermestoides sanguinicollis (incertae sedis)

Clerinae

- Allonyx Jacquelin du Val, 1860
- Anthicoclerus Schenkling, 1906
- Aphelochroa Quedenfeldt, 1885
- Apopempsis Schenkling, 1903
- Apteroclerus Wollaston, 1867
- Aptinoclerus Kuwert, 1893
- Aradamicula Sedlacek & Winkler, 1975
- †Arawakis (fossil)
- Astigmus Kuwert, 1894
- Aulicus Spinola, 1841
- Axina Kirby, 1818
- Balcus
- Barriella Opitz, 2003
- Barrotillus Rifkind, 1996
- Blaxima Gorham, 1882
- Bousquetoclerus Menier, 1997
- Burgeoneus Pic, 1950
- Caestron Dupont in Spinola, 1844
- Calendyma Lacordaire, 1857
- Canariclerus Winkler, 1982
- Cardiostichus Quedenfeldt, 1885
- Caridopus Schenkling in Sjöstedt, 1908
- Cleromorpha Gorham, 1876
- Cleropiestus Fairmaire, 1889
- Clerus Fabricius, 1775
- Clytomadius Corporaal, 1949
- Colyphus Spinola, 1841
- Coptoclerus Chapin, 1924
- Cormodes Pascoe, 1860
- Corynommadius Schenkling, 1899
- Ctenaxina Schenkling, 1906
- Ctenoclerus Solervicens, 1997
- Dasyceroclerus Kuwert, 1894
- Dasyteneclines Pic, 1941
- Dieropsis Gahan, 1908
- Dologenitus Opitz, 2009
- Dozocolletus Chevrolat, 1842
- Eburiphora Spinola, 1841
- Eburneoclerus Pic, 1950
- Ekisius Winkler, 1987
- Eleale Newman, 1840
- Enoclerus Gahan, 1910
- Epiclines Chevrolat in Guérin-Ménéville, 1839
- Eunatalis Schenkling, 1909
  - Eunatalis porcata
- Erymanthus Spinola, 1841
- Eurymetomorphon Pic, 1950
- Falsomadius Gerstmeier, 2002
- Falsoorthrius Pic, 1940
- Graptoclerus Gorham, 1901
- Gyponyx Gorham, 1883
- Hemitrachys Gorham, 1876
- Homalopilo Schenkling, 1915
- Inhumeroclerus Pic, 1955
- Jenjouristia Fursov, 1936
- Languropilus Pic, 1940
- Lissaulicus C.O.Waterhouse, 1879
- Memorthrius Pic, 1940
- Metademius Schenkling, 1899
- Microclerus Wollaston, 1867
- Micropteroclerus Chapin, 1920
- Microstigmatium Kraatz, 1899
- Mimolesterus Gerstmeier, 1991
- Mitrandiria Kolibac, 1997
- Myrmecomaea Fairmaire, 1886
- Natalis Laporte de Castelnau, 1836
- Neogyponyx Schenkling, 1906
- Neoscrobiger Blackburn, 1900
- Ohanlonella Rifkind, 2008
- Olesterus Spinola, 1841
- Omadius Laporte de Castelnau, 1836
- Oodontophlogistus Elston, 1923
- Operculiphorus Kuwert, 1894
- Opilo Latreille, 1802
- Orthrius Gorham, 1876
- Oxystigmatium Kraatz, 1899
- Phlogistomorpha Hintz, 1908
- Phlogistus Gorham, 1876
- Phloiocopus Spinola, 1841
- Phonius Chevrolat, 1843
- Pieleus Pic, 1940
- Placocerus Klug, 1837
- Placopterus Wolcott, 1910
- Plathanocera Schenkling, 1902
- Platyclerus Spinola, 1841
- Priocera Kirby, 1818
- Priocleromorphus Pic, 1950
- Prioclerus Hintz, 1902
- Pseudolesterus Miyatake, 1968
- Pseudomadius Chapin, 1924
- Pujoliclerus Pic, 1947
- Sallea Chevrolat, 1874
- Scrobiger Spinola, 1841
- Sedlacekius Winkler, 1972
- Sikorius Kuwert, 1893
- Stigmatium Gray in Griffith, 1832
- Systenoderes Spinola, 1841
- Tanocleria Hong, 2002
- Thalerocnemis Lohde, 1900
- Thanasimodes Murray, 1867
- Thanasimus Latreille, 1806
  - Thanasimus formicarius – ant beetle
- Tillicera Spinola, 1841
- Trichodes Herbst, 1792
  - Trichodes alvearius
  - Trichodes apiarius
  - Trichodes leucopsideus
- Trogodendron Spinola, 1841
  - Trogodendron fasciculatum – yellow-horned clerid
- Wilsonoclerus
- Winklerius Menier, 1986
- Wittmeridecus Winkler, 1981
- Xenorthrius Gorham, 1892
- Zahradnikius Winkler, 1992
- Zenithicola Spinola, 1841

Enopliinae (sometimes in Korynetinae)

- Antygodera
- Apolopha Spinola, 1841
- Corinthiscus Fairmaire & Germain, 1861
- Cregya LeConte, 1861
- Curacavi
- Enoplium Latreille, 1802
- Exochonotus
- Hublella
- Lasiodera Gray in Griffith, 1832
- Neopylus Solervicens, 1989
- Paracregya
- Pelonium
- Phymatophaea Pascoe, 1876
- Platynoptera Chevrolat, 1834
- Pseudichnea Schenkling, 1900
- Pylus Newman, 1840
- Pyticara Spinola, 1841 (including Pelonides)
- Teneroides Gahan, 1910
- Tenerus Laporte de Castelnau, 1836
- Thriocerodes Wolcott & Dybas, 1947

Epiphloeinae (sometimes in Korynetinae)

- Acanthocollum
- Amboakis
- Decaphloeus
- Decorosa Opitz, 2008
- Diapromeces Opitz, 1997
- Ellipotoma Spinola, 1844
- Epiphloeus Spinola, 1841
- Hapsidopteris Opitz, 1997
- Ichnea Laporte de Castelnau, 1836
- Iontoclerus Opitz, 1997
- Katamyurus Opitz, 1997
- Madoniella Pic, 1935
- Megaphloeus
- Megatrachys Opitz, 1997
- Opitzius Barr, 2006
- Parvochaetus Opitz, 2006
- Pennasolis Opitz, 2008
- Pericales
- Pilosirus Opitz, 1997
- Plocamocera Spinola, 1844
- Pteroferus
- Pyticeroides Kuwert, 1894
- Silveirasia
- Stegnoclava
- Turbophloeus

Hydnocerinae (including Phyllobaeninae)

- Abrosius Fairmaire, 1902
- Achlamys C.O.Waterhouse, 1879
- Allelidea G.R.Waterhouse, 1839
- Blaesiophthalmus Schenkling, 1903
- Brachycallimerus Chapin, 1924
- Brachyptevenus
- Callimerus Gorham, 1876
- Cephaloclerus Kuwert, 1893
- Cucujocallimerus Pic, 1929
- Emmepus Motschulsky, 1845
- Eurymetopum Blanchard, 1842
- Isohydnocera Chapin, 1917
- Isolemidia Gorham, 1877
- Laiomorphus Pic, 1927
- Lasiocallimerus Corporaal, 1939
- Lemidia Spinola, 1841
- Neohydnus Gorham, 1892
- Parmius Sharp, 1877
- Paupris Sharp, 1877
- Phyllobaenus Dejean, 1837
- Silviella Solervicens, 1987
- Solemidia
- Stenocallimerus Corporaal& Pic, 1940
- Theano Laporte de Castelnau, 1836
- Wolcottia Chapin, 1917

Korynetinae

- Chariessa Perty in Spix & Martius, 1830
- Korynetes Herbst, 1792
  - Korynetes caeruleus – steely blue beetle
- Lebasiella Spinola, 1844
- Loedelia R.Lucas, 1918
- Necrobia Latreille, 1797
  - Necrobia ruficollis – red-shouldered ham beetle
  - Necrobia rufipes – red-legged ham beetle
- Neorthopleura Barr, 1976
- Opetiopalpus Spinola, 1844
- Romanaeclerus Winkler, 1960

Tarsosteninae (sometimes in Korynetinae)

- Paratillus Gorham, 1876
- Tarsostenodes Blackburn, 1900
- Tarsostenus Spinola, 1844

Thaneroclerinae (tentatively placed here)

- Cleridopsis Champion, 1913
- Compactoclerus Pic, 1939
- Cyrtinoclerus Chapin, 1924
- Isoclerus Lewis, 1892
- Meprinogenus Kolibáč, 1992
- Neoclerus Lewis, 1892
- Onerunka Kolibáč
- Thaneroclerus Lefebvre, 1838
- Viticlerus
- Zenodosus Wolcott, 1910

Tillinae

- Antenius Fairmaire, 1903
- Arachnoclerus Fairmaire, 1902
- Araeodontia Barr, 1952
- Archalius Fairmaire, 1903
- Aroterus Schenkling, 1906
- Basilewskyus Pic, 1950
- Biflabellotillus Pic, 1949
- Bilbotillus Kolibac, 1997
- Bogcia Barr, 1978
- Bostrichoclerus Van Dyke, 1938
- Callotillus Wolcott, 1911
- Ceratocopus Hintz, 1902
- Chilioclerus Solervicens, 1976
- Cladiscopallenis Pic, 1949
- Cladiscus Chevrolat, 1843
- Cladomorpha Pic, 1949
- Cteniopachys Fairmaire, 1889
- Cylidroctenus Kraatz, 1899
- Cylidrus Latreille, 1825
- Cymatodera Gray in Griffith, 1832
- Cymatoderella Barr, 1962
- Dedana Fairmaire, 1888
- Denops Fischer von Waldheim, 1829
- Diplocladus Fairmaire, 1885
- Diplopherusa Heller, 1921
- Eburneocladiscus Pic, 1955
- Egenocladiscus Corporaal& van der Wiel, 1949
- Elasmocylidrus Corporaal, 1939
- Enoploclerus Hintz, 1902
- Eucymatodera Schenkling, 1899
- Falsopallenis Pic, 1926
- Falsotillus Gerstmeier & Kuff, 1992
- Flabellotilloidea Gerstmeier & Kuff, 1992
- Gastrocentrum Gorham, 1876
- Gracilotillus Pic, 1933
- Impressopallenis Pic, 1953
- Isocymatodera Hintz, 1902
- Lecontella Wolcott & Chapin, 1918
- Leptoclerus Kraatz, 1899
- Liostylus Fairmaire, 1886
- Macroliostylus Pic, 1939
- Magnotillus Pic, 1936
- Melanoclerus Chapin, 1919
- Microtillus Pic, 1950
- Monophylla Spinola, 1841
- Neocallotillus Burke, 2016
- Nodepus Gorham, 1892
- Notocymatodera Schenkling, 1907
- Onychotillus Chapin, 1945
- Orthocladiscus Corporaal& van der Wiel, 1949
- Pallenis Laporte de Castelnau, 1836
- Paracladiscus Miyatake, 1965
- Paradoxocerus Kraatz, 1899
- Paraspinoza Corporaal, 1942
- Philocalus Klug, 1842
- Picoclerus Corporaal, 1936
- †Prospinoza (fossil)
- Pseudachlamys Duvivier, 1892
- Pseudogyponix Pic, 1939
- Pseudopallenis Kuwert, 1893
- Pseudoteloclerus Pic, 1932
- Rhopaloclerus Fairmaire, 1886
- Smudlotillus Kolibac, 1997
- Spinoza Lewis, 1892
- Stenocylidrus Spinola, 1844
- Strotocera Schenkling, 1902
- Synellapotillus Pic, 1939
- Synellapus Fairmaire, 1903
- Teloclerus Schenkling, 1903
- Tilloclerus White, 1849
- Tillodadiscus Pic, 1953
- Tillodenops Hintz, 1905
- Tilloidea Laporte de Castelnau, 1832
- Tillus Olivier, 1790
- Tylotosoma Hintz, 1902

Incertae sedis

- Aphelocerus Kirsch, 1871 (Clerinae? Tillinae?)
- Apteropilo Lea, 1908 (Clerinae? Enopliinae?)
- Cleropiestus Fairmaire, 1889 (Clerinae? Hydnocerinae?)
- Dermestoides Schaeffer, 1771 (Korynetinae s.l.?)
- Evenoclerus Corporaal, 1950 (Clerinae? Hydnocerinae?)
- Muisca Spinola, 1844 (Clerinae? Enopliinae?)
- Parapelonides Barr, 1980 (Korynetinae s.l.?)
- Perilypus Spinola, 1841 (Clerinae? Tillinae?)
- Syriopelta Winkler, 1984 (Korynetinae s.l.?)
