= Paratillus =

Scientific classification
- Domain: Eukaryota
- Kingdom: Animalia
- Phylum: Arthropoda
- Class: Insecta
- Order: Coleoptera
- Suborder: Polyphaga
- Infraorder: Cucujiformia
- Family: Cleridae
- Subfamily: Tarsosteninae
- Genus: Paratillus; Gorham, 1876

Genus of beetles

Paratillus is a genus of checkered beetles in the family Cleridae. There is one described species in Paratillus, P. carus.
