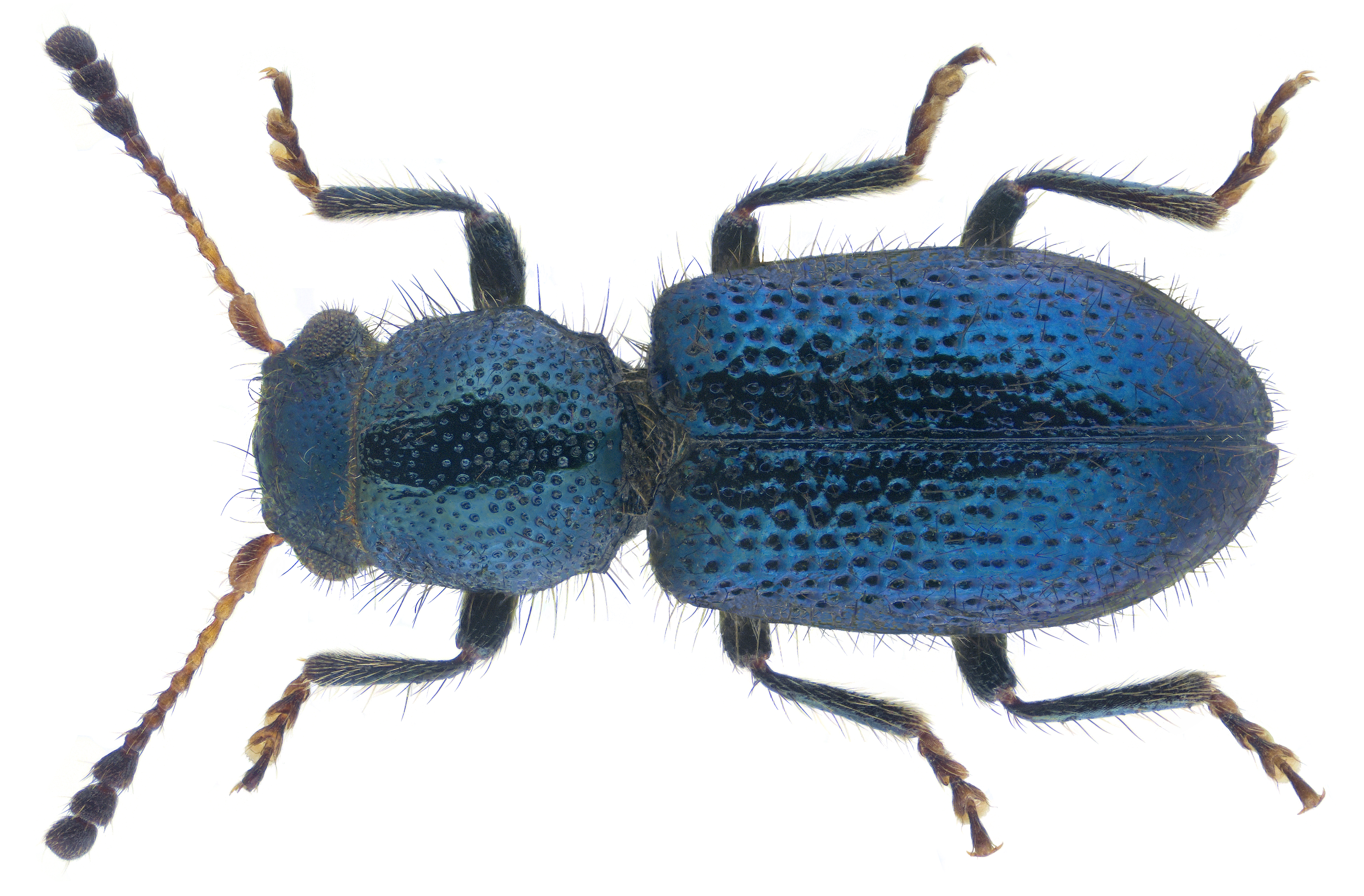
- Korynetes ruficornis

Scientific classification
- Domain: Eukaryota
- Kingdom: Animalia
- Phylum: Arthropoda
- Class: Insecta
- Order: Coleoptera
- Suborder: Polyphaga
- Infraorder: Cucujiformia
- Family: Cleridae
- Genus: Korynetes; Herbst, 1792

Synonyms
- Corynetes Paykull, 1798 (Unav.)

= Korynetes =

Genus of insects

Korynetes is a genus of beetles belonging to the family Cleridae.

Species:

- Korynetes caeruleus (de Geer, 1775)
- Korynetes geniculatus Klug, 1842
- Korynetes ruficornis Sturm, 1837
