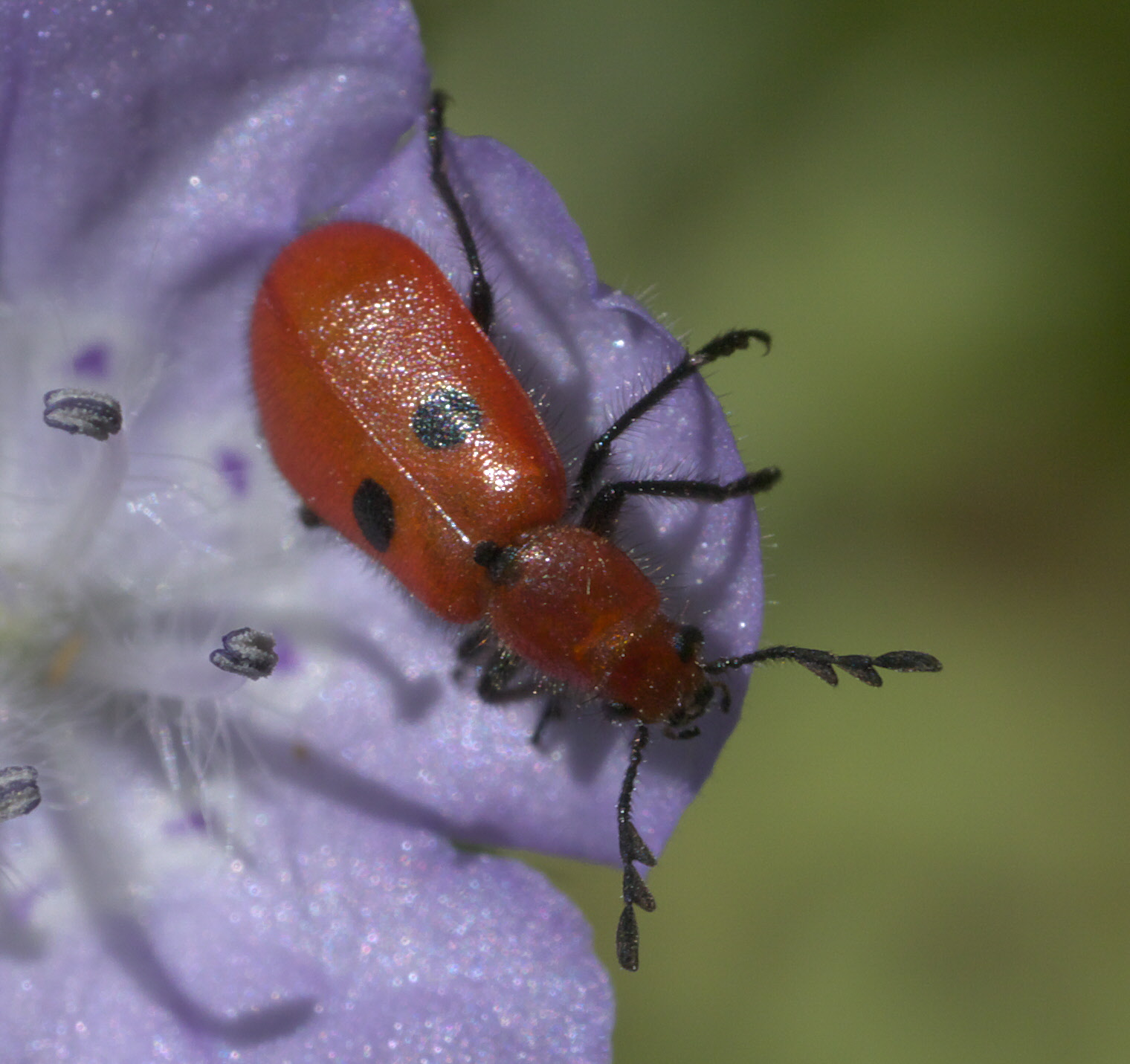
- Pelonides quadrinotata

Scientific classification
- Kingdom: Animalia
- Phylum: Arthropoda
- Class: Insecta
- Order: Coleoptera
- Suborder: Polyphaga
- Infraorder: Cucujiformia
- Family: Cleridae
- Subfamily: Enopliinae; Cistel, 1856

Genera
- See text

= Enopliinae =

Subfamily of beetles

Enopliinae is a subfamily of beetles in the family Cleridae.

== Genera ==
Apolopha – Apteropilo – Boschella – Chariessa – Corinthiscus – Cregya – Curacavi – Enoplium – Exochonotus – Lasiodera – Neopylus – Neorthopleura – Pelonides – Pelonium – Parapelonides – Phymatophaea – Platynoptera – Pseudichnea – Pylus – Pyticara – Tenerus
