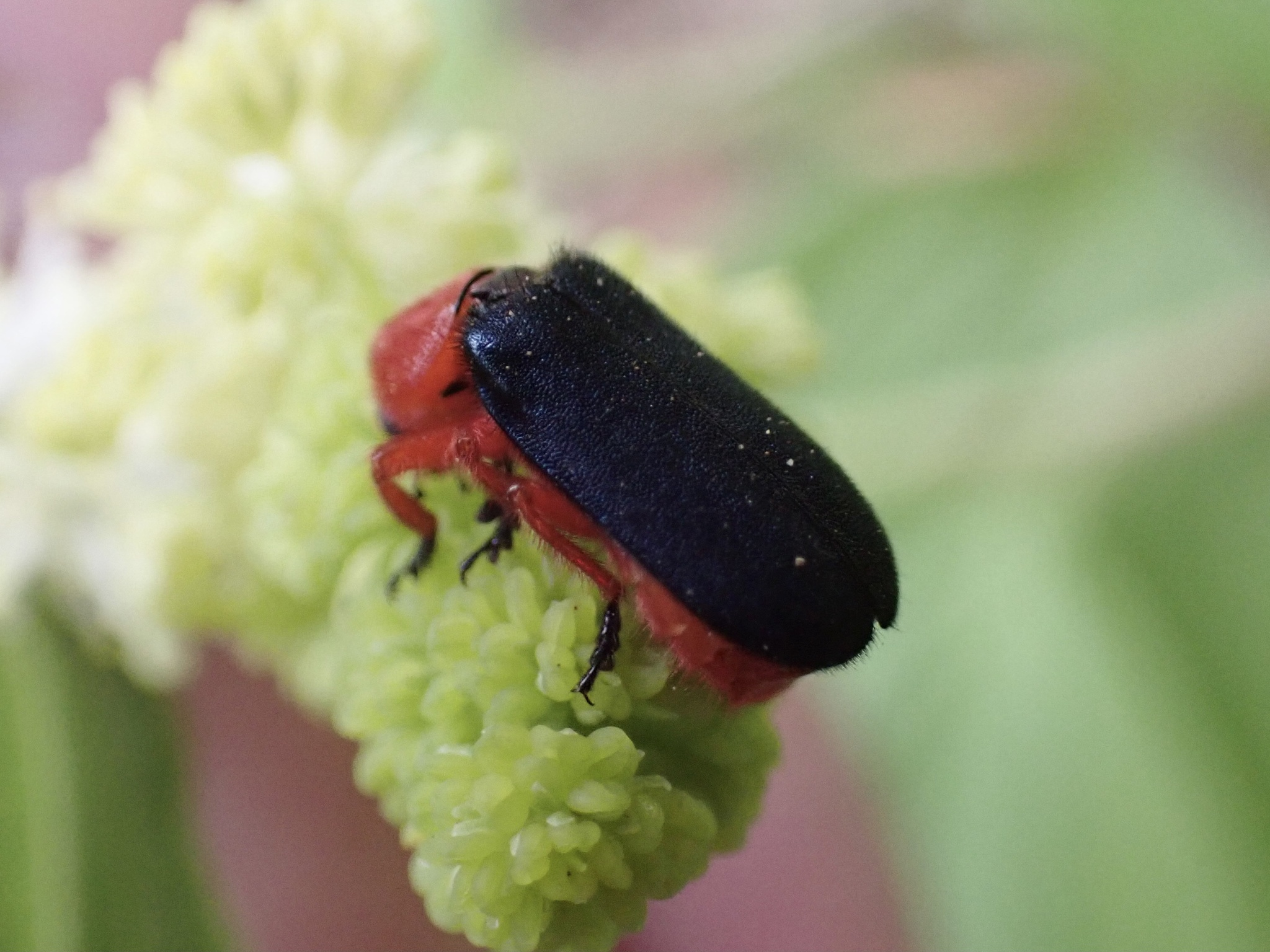

Scientific classification
- Domain: Eukaryota
- Kingdom: Animalia
- Phylum: Arthropoda
- Class: Insecta
- Order: Coleoptera
- Suborder: Polyphaga
- Infraorder: Cucujiformia
- Family: Cleridae
- Genus: Chariessa
- Species: C. catalina

Binomial name
- Chariessa catalina Optiz, 2017

= Chariessa catalina =

North American checkered beetle

Chariessa catalina is a recently described species of North American checkered beetle. Chariessa catalina can be distinguished from Chariessa elegans by an elytra that is closer to blue than black, and a forebody that is closer to crimson than C. elegans' diluted-blood red. C. catalina and C. elegans share a range in the southwestern corner of the continent but the range of C. elegans extends north toward the U.S.-Canadian border. This species seems to be most often encountered in March. The type specimen was collected in the Catalina Mountains of Arizona in 1969.
