= Tenerus =

Tenerus may refer to:

- Tenerus (son of Apollo), in ancient Greek religion and mythology, the Theban hero who was the son and prophet of Apollo, and whose mother was the Oceanid nymph Melia.
- Tenereus (beetle), a genus of checkered beetles in the family Cleridae
