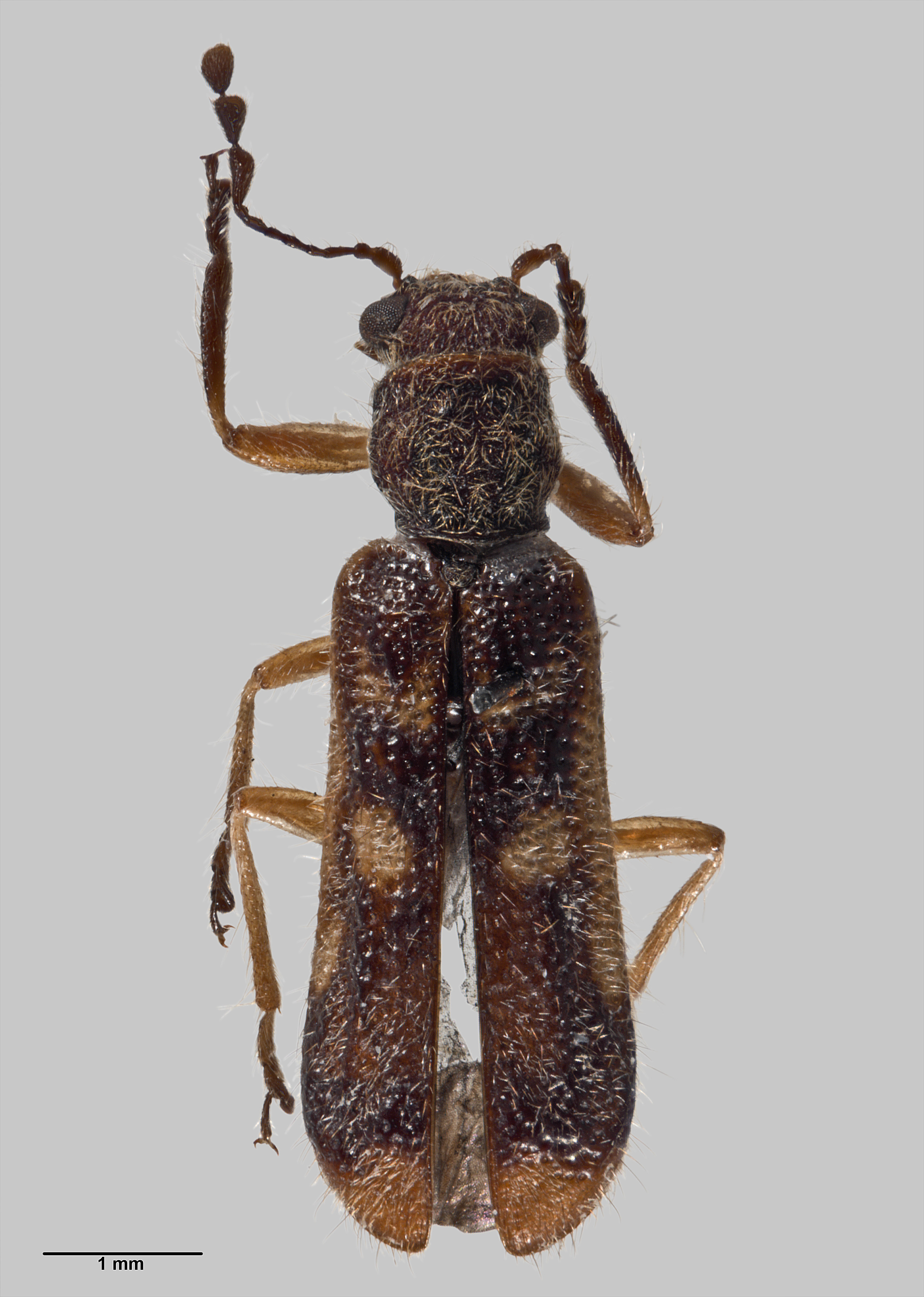
- Holotype specimen of Phymatophaea maorias AMNZ84839 held at the Auckland War Memorial Museum

Scientific classification
- Kingdom: Animalia
- Phylum: Arthropoda
- Class: Insecta
- Order: Coleoptera
- Suborder: Polyphaga
- Infraorder: Cucujiformia
- Family: Cleridae
- Genus: Phymatophaea
- Species: P. maorias

Binomial name
- Phymatophaea maorias Opitz, 2009

= Phymatophaea maorias =

Species of beetle

Phymatophaea maorias is a species of beetle in the subfamily Enopliinae. It is found in New Zealand.
