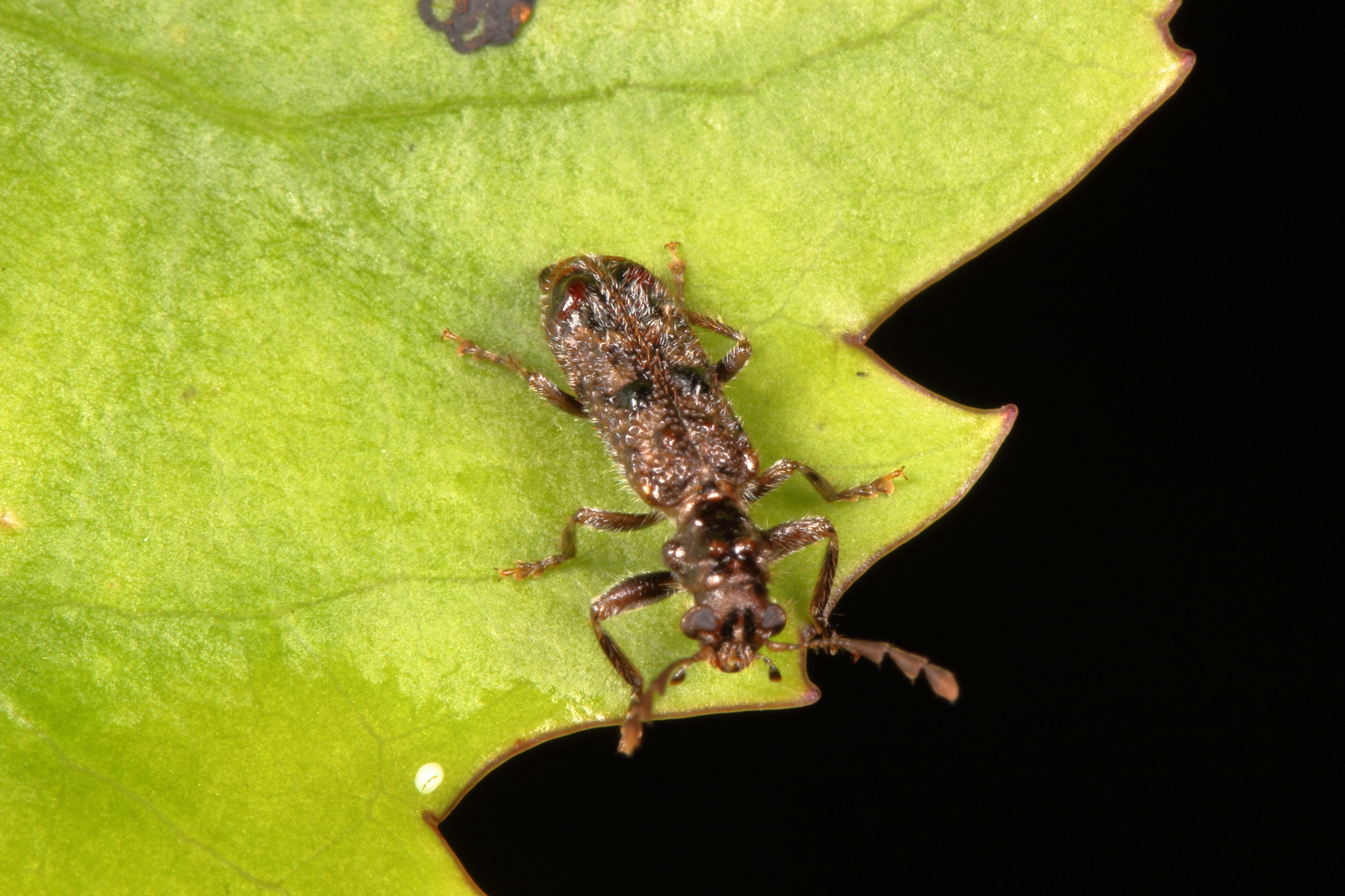

Scientific classification
- Kingdom: Animalia
- Phylum: Arthropoda
- Class: Insecta
- Order: Coleoptera
- Suborder: Polyphaga
- Infraorder: Cucujiformia
- Family: Cleridae
- Genus: Phymatophaea
- Species: P. aquila

Binomial name
- Phymatophaea aquila Opitz, 2009

= Phymatophaea aquila =

Species of beetle

Phymatophaea aquila is a species of checkered beetles in the subfamily Enopliinae. The species is endemic to New Zealand.

== Etymology ==
The specific epithet aquila is a Latin adjectival that stems from aquilus, meaning dark coloured, in reference to the dark colour of the midelytral gibba.
