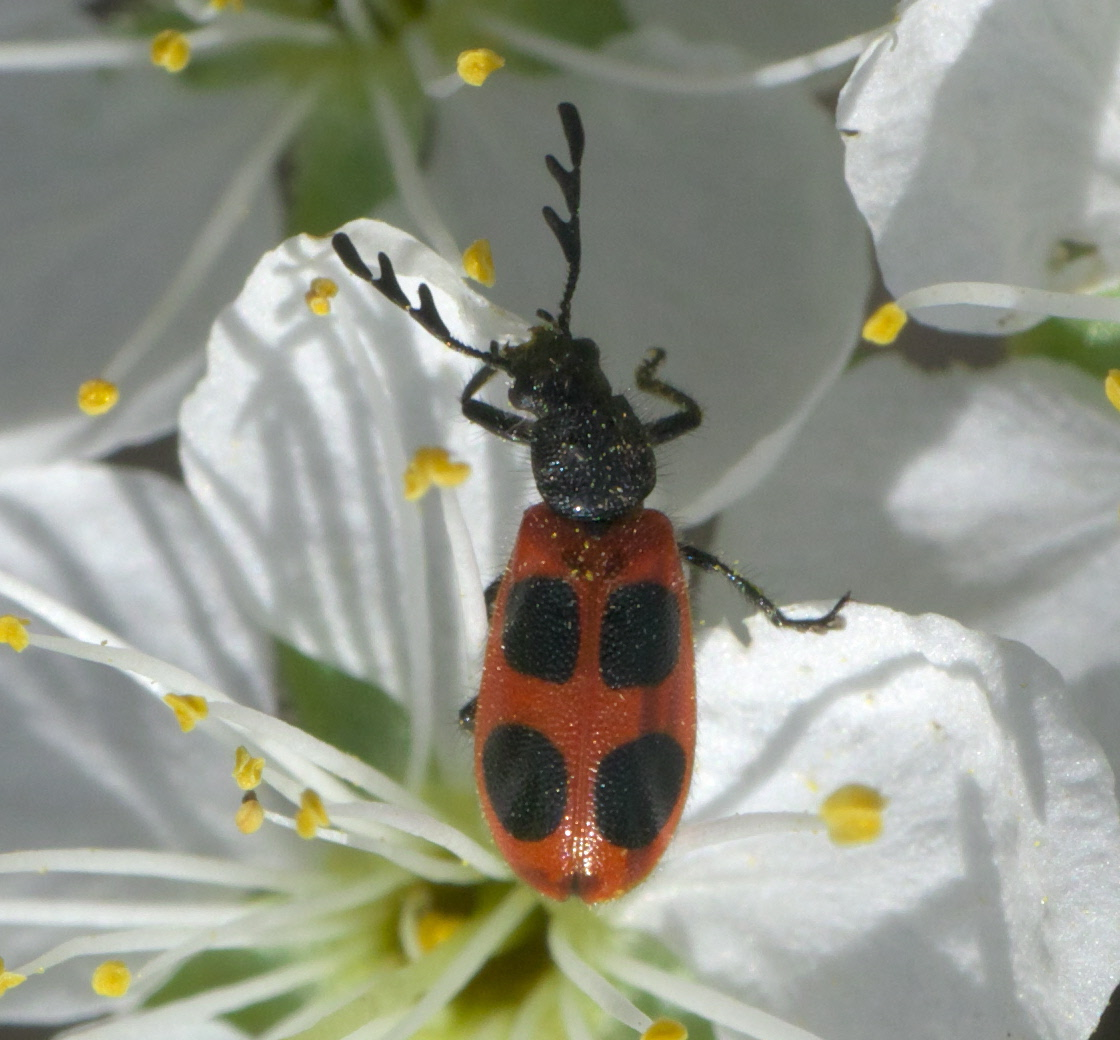

Scientific classification
- Kingdom: Animalia
- Phylum: Arthropoda
- Clade: Pancrustacea
- Class: Insecta
- Order: Coleoptera
- Suborder: Polyphaga
- Infraorder: Cucujiformia
- Family: Cleridae
- Subfamily: Enopliinae
- Genus: Pelonides
- Species: P. quadripunctata

Binomial name
- Pelonides quadripunctata (Say 1823)

Synonyms
- Pelonides quadripunctatus

= Pelonides quadripunctata =

Species of beetles

Pelonides quadripunctata, the four-spotted checkered beetle, is a species of checkered beetle in the family Cleridae. It is found in North America.

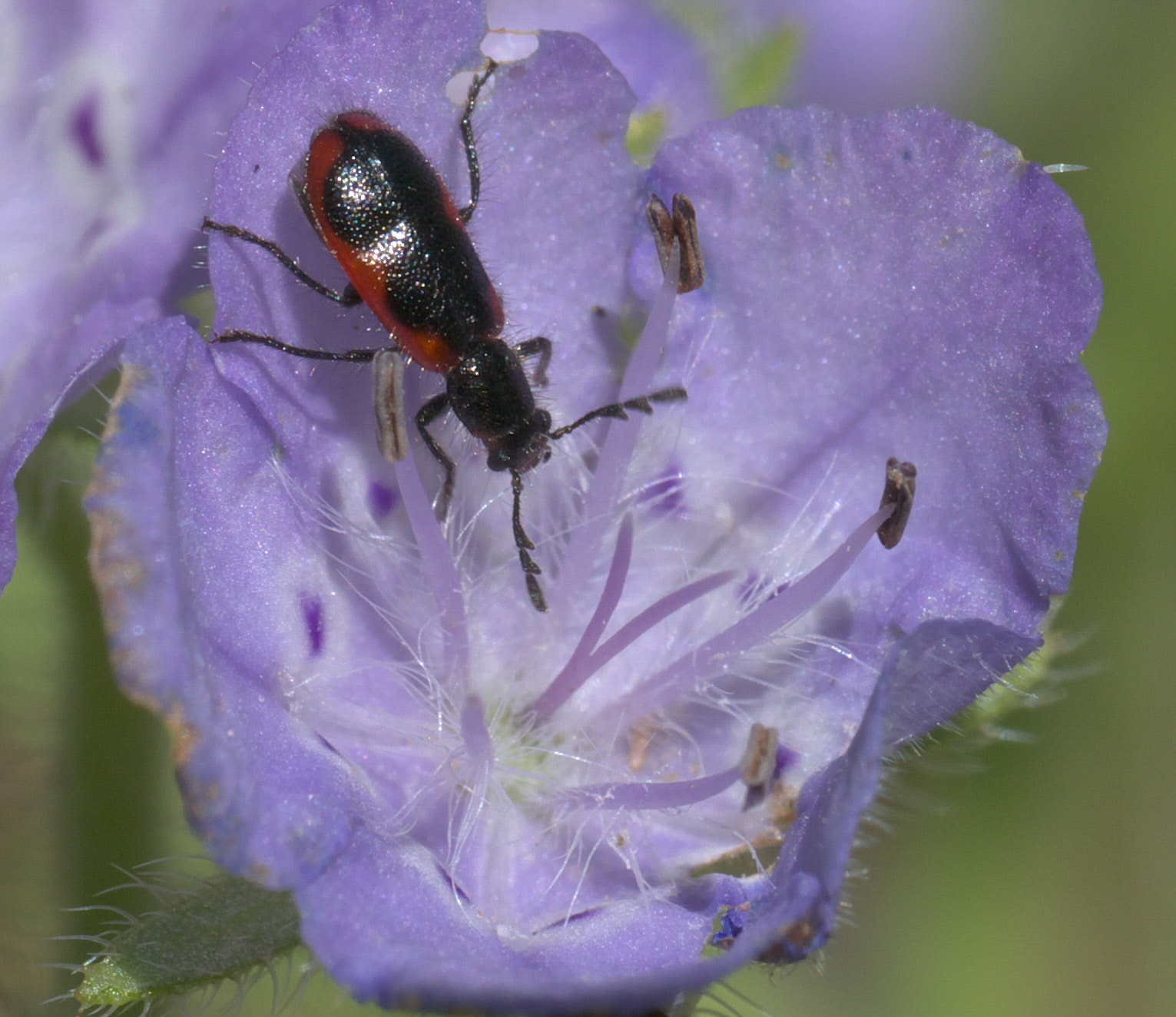
Pelonides quadripunctata, four-spotted checkered beetle, Oklahoma
