= Apteropilo =

Scientific classification
- Domain: Eukaryota
- Kingdom: Animalia
- Phylum: Arthropoda
- Class: Insecta
- Order: Coleoptera
- Suborder: Polyphaga
- Infraorder: Cucujiformia
- Family: Cleridae
- Subfamily: Enopliinae
- Genus: Apteropilo; Lea, 1908

Synonyms
- Pylusopsis

Genus of beetles

Apteropilo is a genus of beetles in the subfamily Clerinae.

== Species ==
- Apteropilo chrysocome Elston, 1929
- Apteropilo clarinotus Bartlett, 2009
- Apteropilo humerofuscus Bartlett, 2009
- Apteropilo pictipes Lea, 1908
- Apteropilo raldae Bartlett, 2009
- Apteropilo volans Bartlett, 2009
