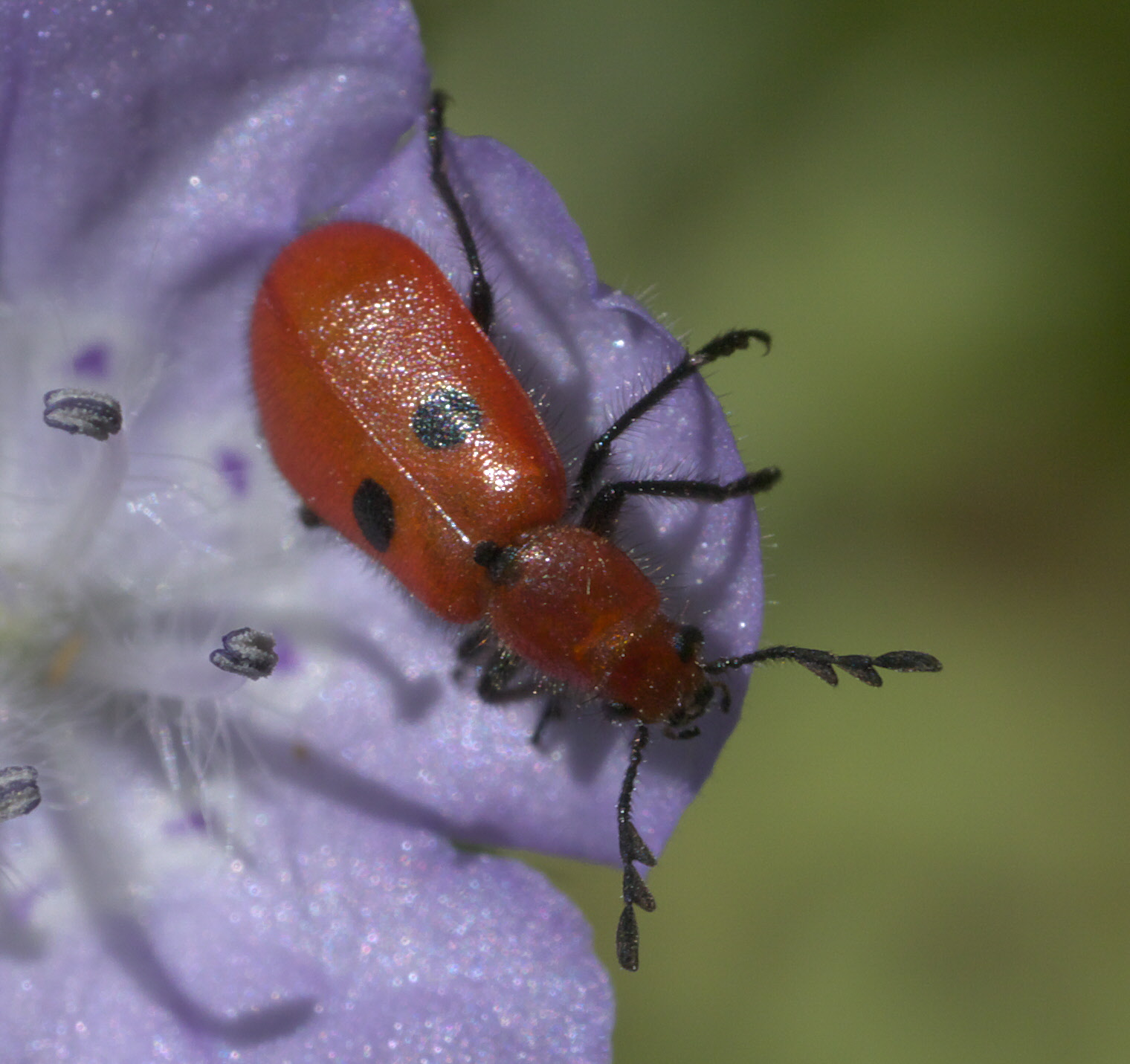

Scientific classification
- Kingdom: Animalia
- Phylum: Arthropoda
- Class: Insecta
- Order: Coleoptera
- Suborder: Polyphaga
- Infraorder: Cucujiformia
- Family: Cleridae
- Subfamily: Enopliinae
- Genus: Pelonides
- Species: P. quadrinotata

Binomial name
- Pelonides quadrinotata (Haldeman, 1853)

= Pelonides quadrinotata =

Species of beetles

Pelonides quadrinotata is a species of checkered beetle in the family Cleridae. It is found in North America

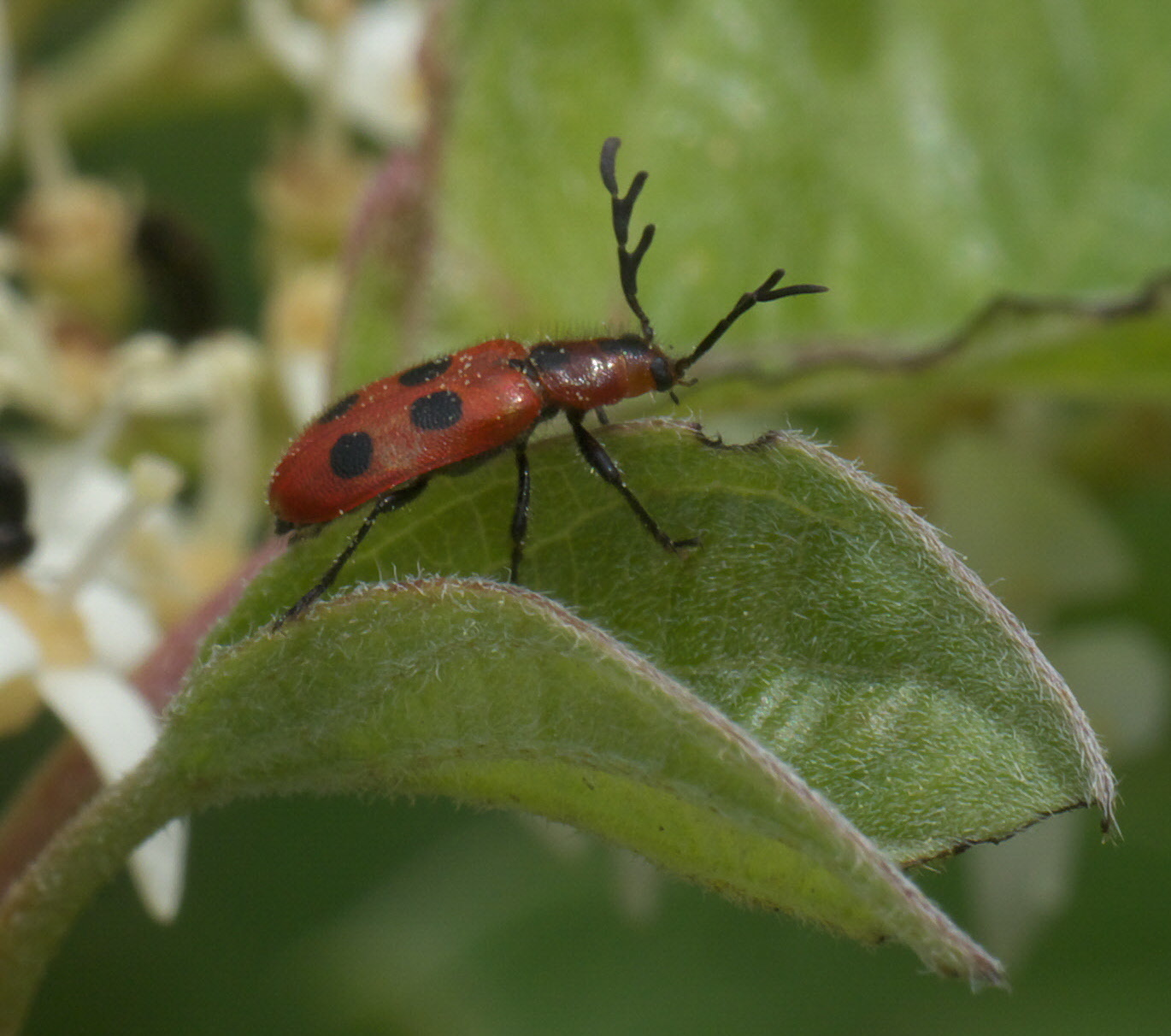
Pelonides quadrinotata, Oklahoma
