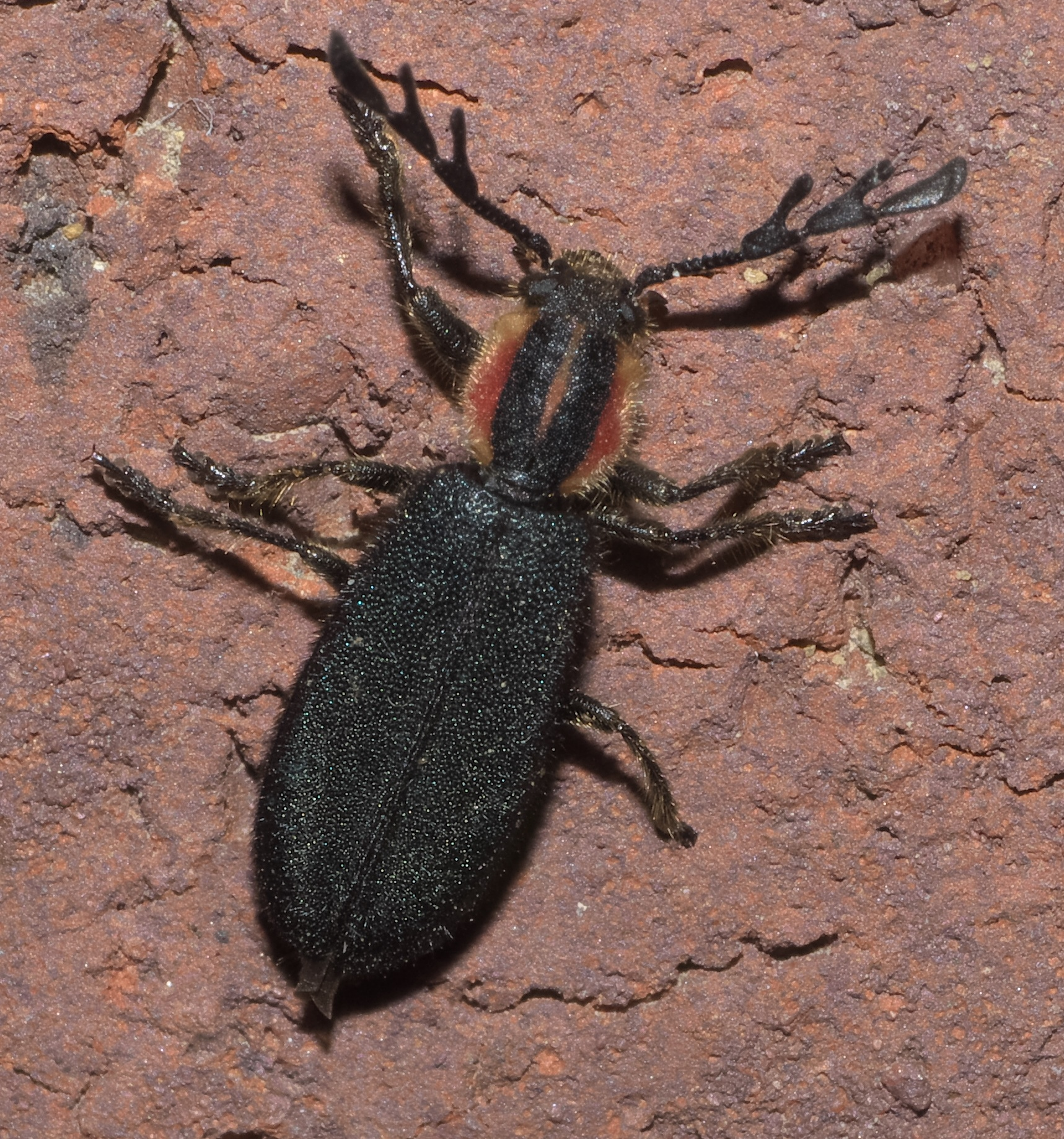

Scientific classification
- Kingdom: Animalia
- Phylum: Arthropoda
- Clade: Pancrustacea
- Class: Insecta
- Order: Coleoptera
- Suborder: Polyphaga
- Infraorder: Cucujiformia
- Family: Cleridae
- Genus: Chariessa
- Species: C. pilosa

Binomial name
- Chariessa pilosa (Forster, 1781)

= Chariessa pilosa =

Species of beetle

Chariessa pilosa is a species of checkered beetle in the family Cleridae. It is found in Europe and Northern Asia (excluding China) and North America. It is a predator of wood-boring beetles and lives in the galleries made by said beetles, including during pupation.

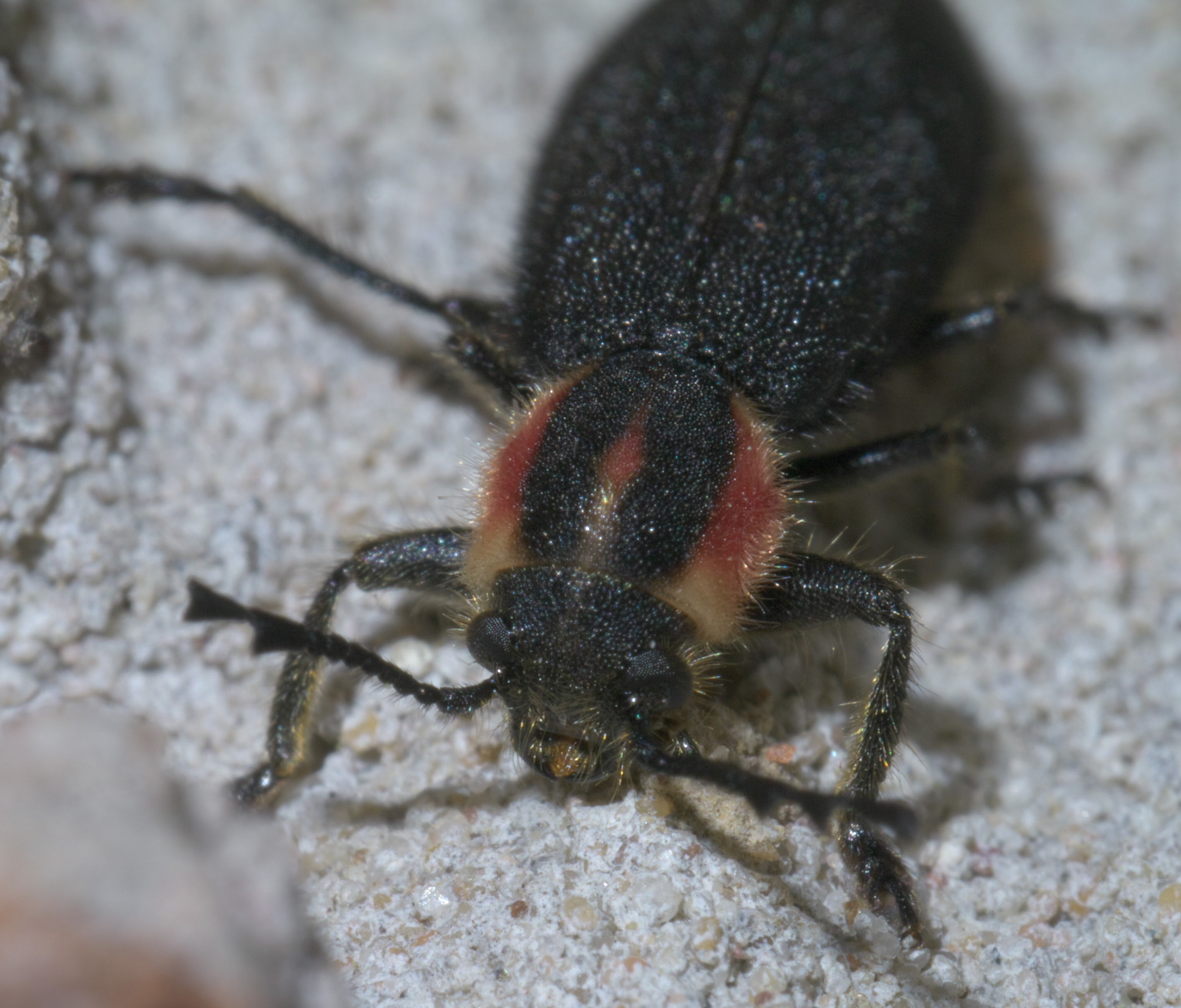
