= Chariessa dichroa =

Scientific classification
- Domain: Eukaryota
- Kingdom: Animalia
- Phylum: Arthropoda
- Class: Insecta
- Order: Coleoptera
- Suborder: Polyphaga
- Infraorder: Cucujiformia
- Family: Cleridae
- Genus: Chariessa
- Species: C. dichroa

Binomial name
- Chariessa dichroa (LeConte, 1865)

Species of beetle

Chariessa dichroa is a species of checkered beetle, belonging to the genus Chariessa. It is found in North America, most commonly on the West Coast. C. dichroa is distinguished from similar members of its genus by its black legs. Like other Chariessa beetles, it is carnivorous.
