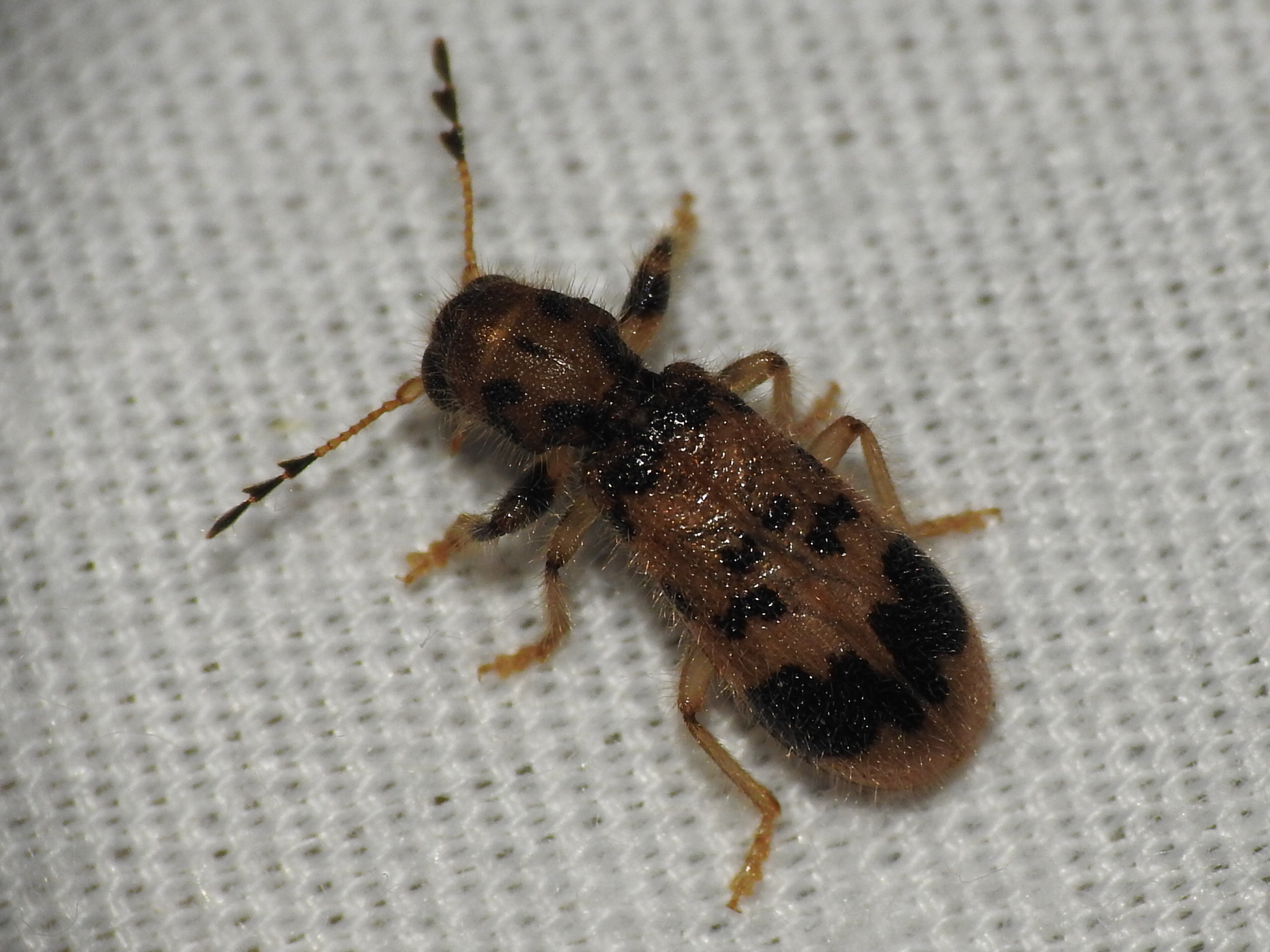

Scientific classification
- Kingdom: Animalia
- Phylum: Arthropoda
- Clade: Pancrustacea
- Class: Insecta
- Order: Coleoptera
- Suborder: Polyphaga
- Infraorder: Cucujiformia
- Family: Cleridae
- Genus: Pelonium
- Species: P. maculicolle

Binomial name
- Pelonium maculicolle Schaeffer, 1904

= Pelonium maculicolle =

Species of beetle

Pelonium maculicolle is a species of checkered beetle in the family Cleridae. It is found in Central America and North America.
