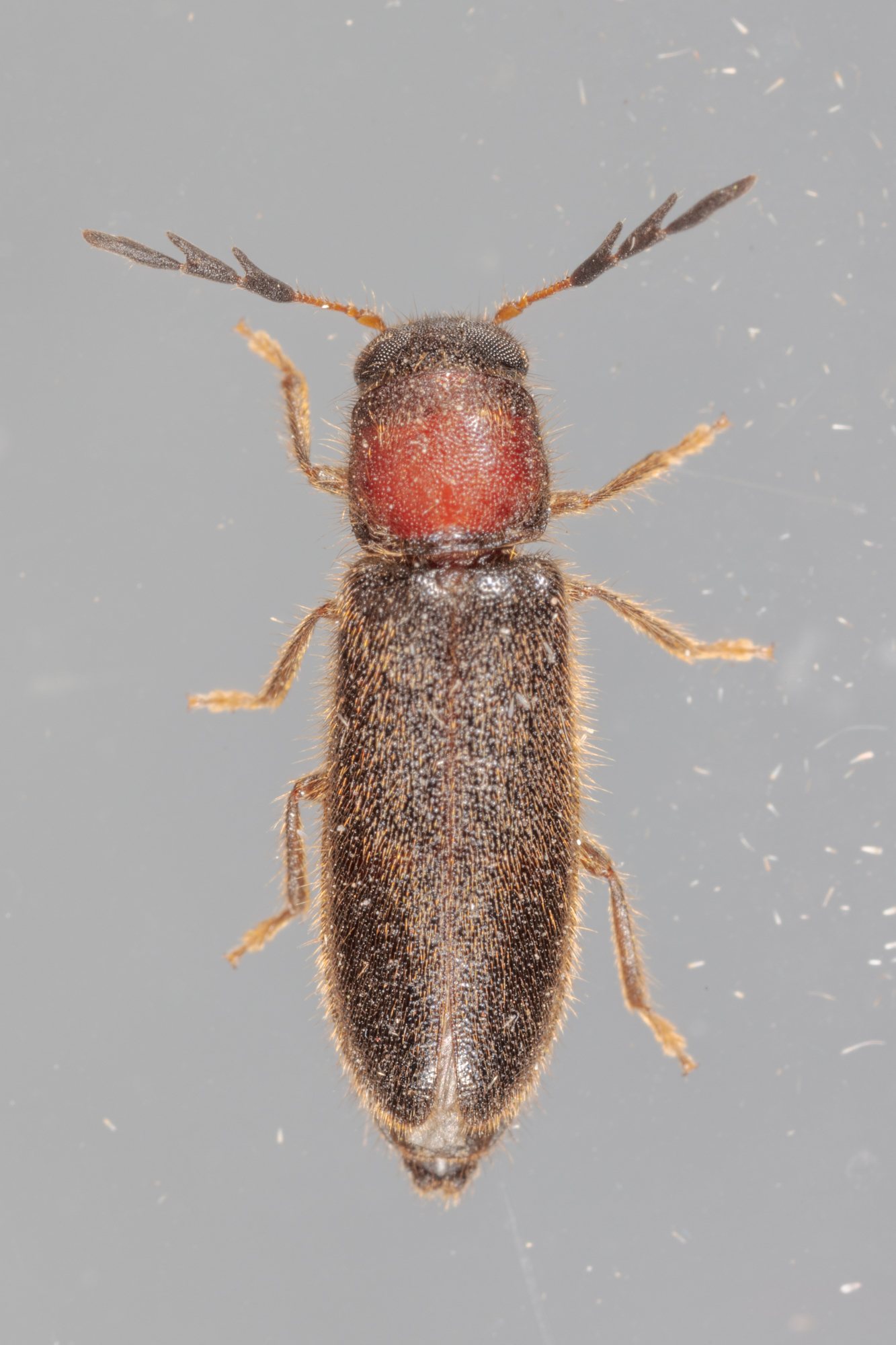

Scientific classification
- Domain: Eukaryota
- Kingdom: Animalia
- Phylum: Arthropoda
- Class: Insecta
- Order: Coleoptera
- Suborder: Polyphaga
- Infraorder: Cucujiformia
- Family: Cleridae
- Genus: Neorthopleura
- Species: N. texana

Binomial name
- Neorthopleura texana (Bland, 1863)

= Neorthopleura texana =

Species of beetle

Neorthopleura texana is a species of checkered beetle in the family Cleridae. It is found in Central America and North America.
