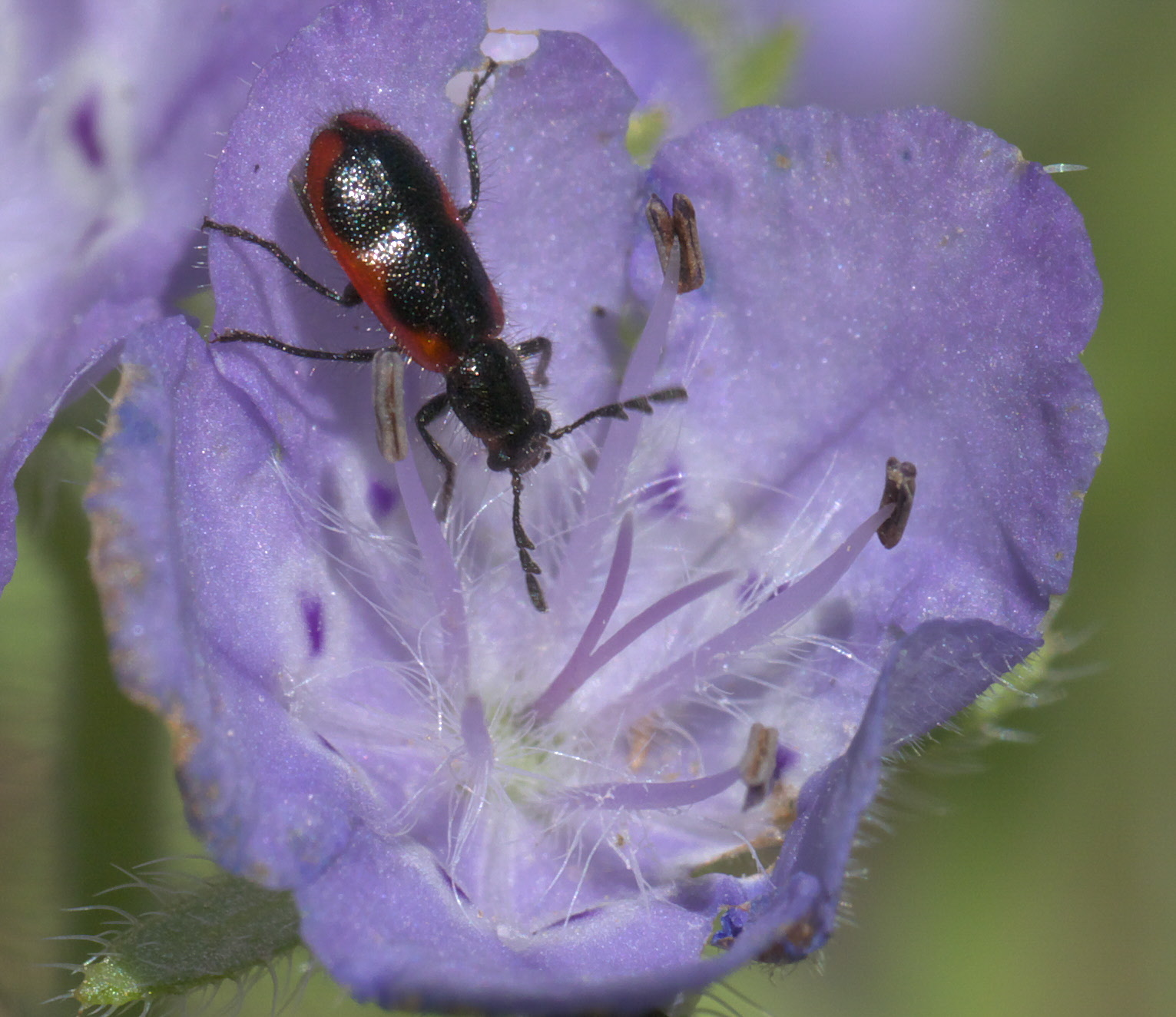

Scientific classification
- Kingdom: Animalia
- Phylum: Arthropoda
- Class: Insecta
- Order: Coleoptera
- Suborder: Polyphaga
- Infraorder: Cucujiformia
- Family: Cleridae
- Subfamily: Enopliinae
- Genus: Pelonides; Kuwert, 1894

= Pelonides =

Genus of beetles

Pelonides is a genus of checkered beetles in the family Cleridae. There are about six described species in Pelonides.

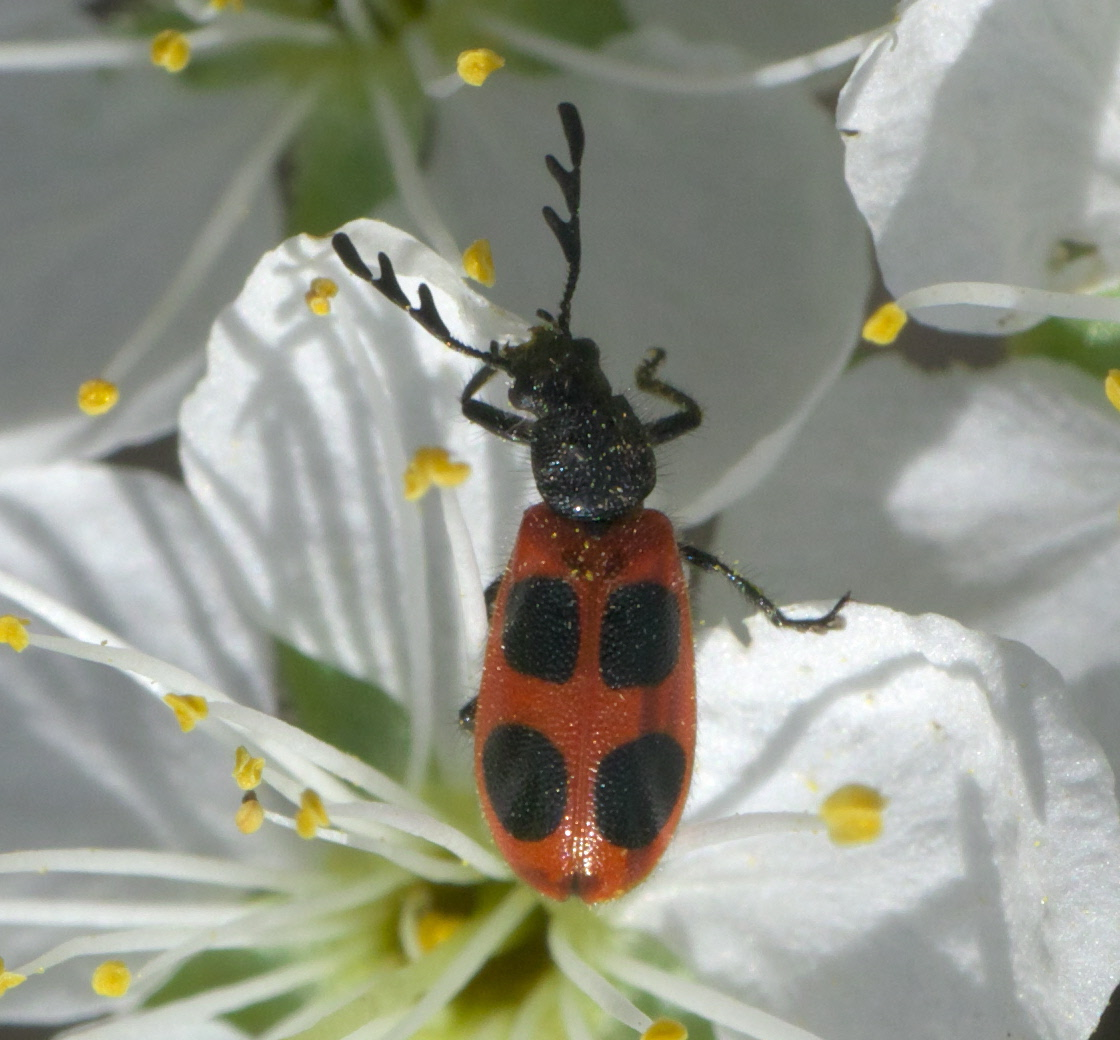
Pelonides quadripunctata

== Species ==
These species belong to the genus Pelonides:

- Pelonides granulatipennis (Schaeffer, 1904)
- Pelonides humeralis (Horn, 1868)
- Pelonides quadrinotata (Haldeman, 1853)
- Pelonides quadripunctata (Say, 1823) (four-spotted checkered beetle)
- Pelonides scabripennis (LeConte, 1866)
- Pelonides similis Knull, 1938
