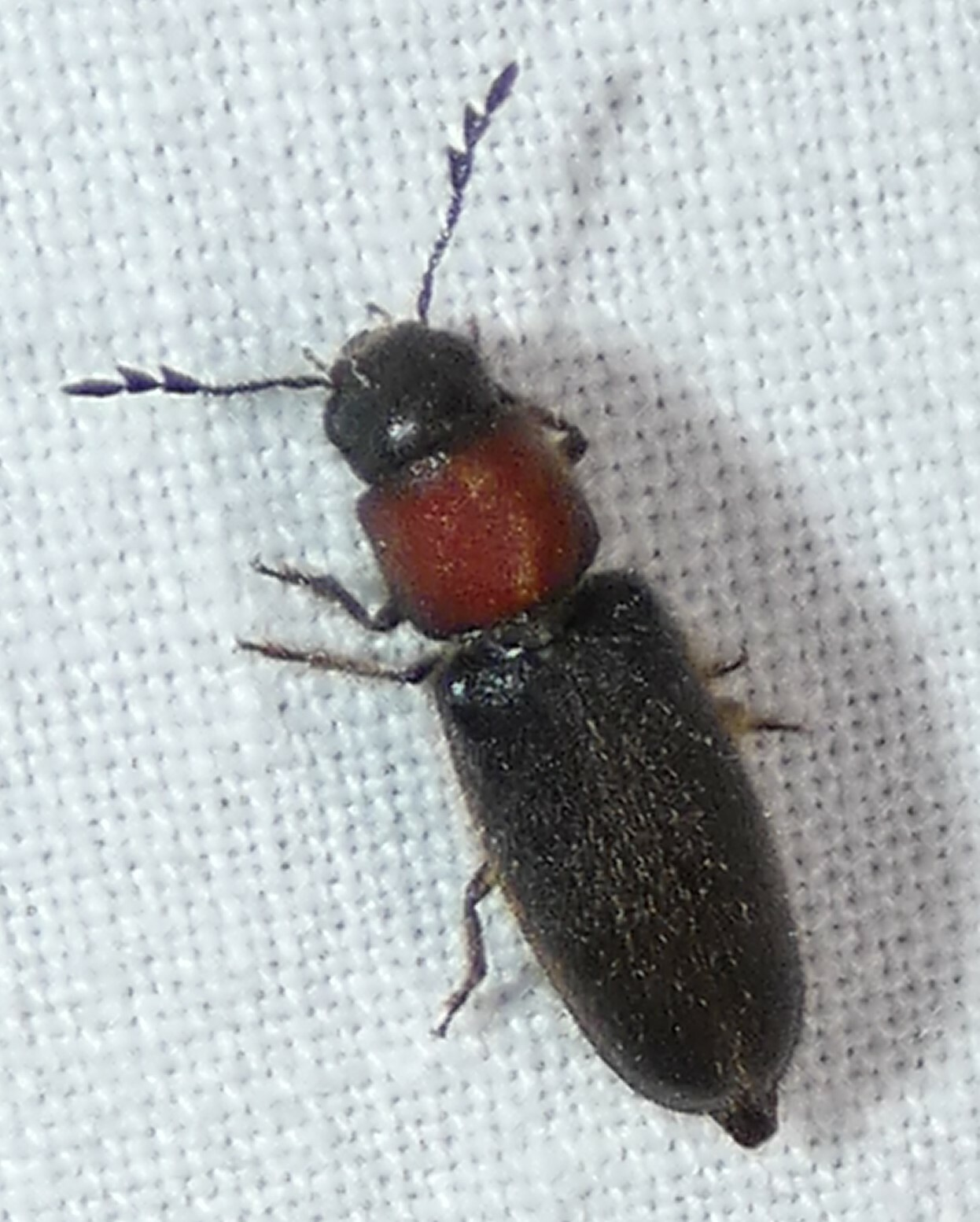

Scientific classification
- Kingdom: Animalia
- Phylum: Arthropoda
- Class: Insecta
- Order: Coleoptera
- Suborder: Polyphaga
- Infraorder: Cucujiformia
- Family: Cleridae
- Genus: Neorthopleura
- Species: N. thoracica

Binomial name
- Neorthopleura thoracica (Say, 1823)

= Neorthopleura thoracica =

Species of beetle

Neorthopleura thoracica is a species of checkered beetle in the family Cleridae. It is found in the Caribbean Sea, Central America, and North America. Adults prey upon wood-boring beetles, and can found in dead wood, especially oak.
