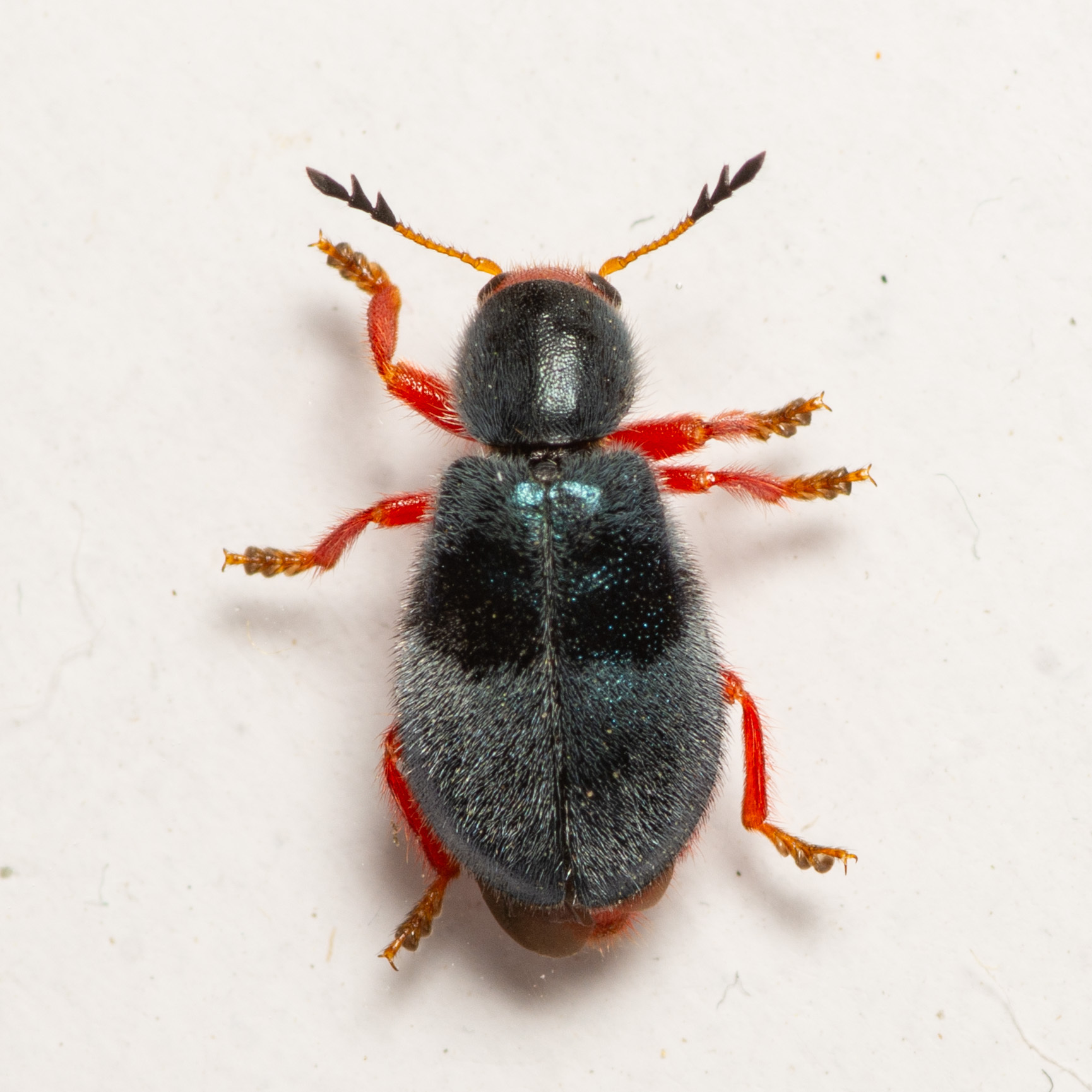

Scientific classification
- Domain: Eukaryota
- Kingdom: Animalia
- Phylum: Arthropoda
- Class: Insecta
- Order: Coleoptera
- Suborder: Polyphaga
- Infraorder: Cucujiformia
- Family: Cleridae
- Genus: Chariessa
- Species: C. vestita

Binomial name
- Chariessa vestita Chevrolat, 1835

= Chariessa vestita =

Species of beetle

Chariessa vestita is a species of checkered beetle in the family Cleridae. It is found in Central America, North America, and South America.
