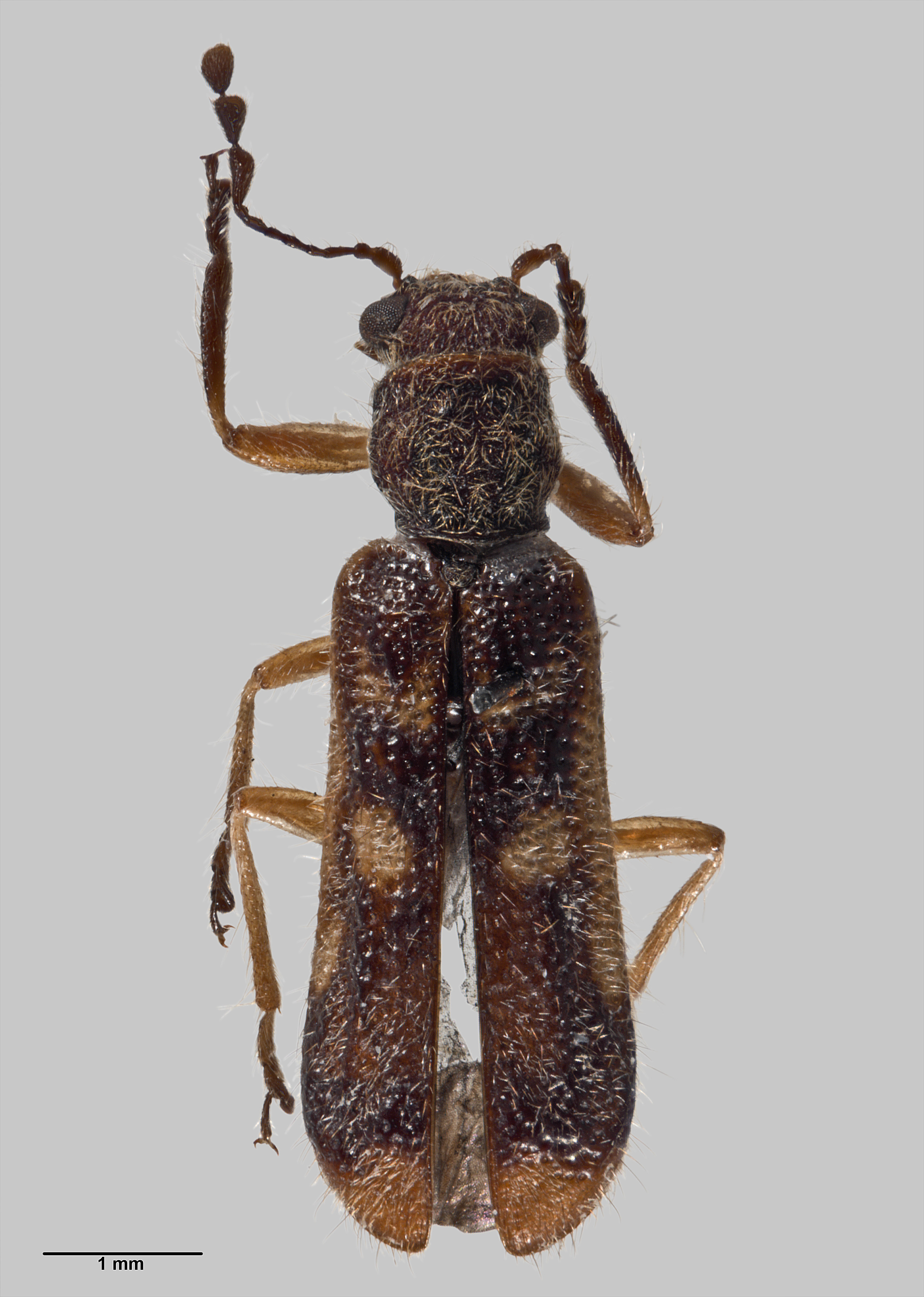
- Holotype specimen of Phymatophaea maorias AMNZ84839 held at the Auckland War Memorial Museum

Scientific classification
- Kingdom: Animalia
- Phylum: Arthropoda
- Class: Insecta
- Order: Coleoptera
- Suborder: Polyphaga
- Infraorder: Cucujiformia
- Family: Cleridae
- Subfamily: Enopliinae
- Genus: Phymatophaea; Pascoe, 1876

Species
- See text

Synonyms
- ?Eumede Pascoe, 1876; Mathesis Waterhouse, 1877

= Phymatophaea =

Genus of beetles

Phymatophaea is a genus of checkered beetles in the subfamily Enopliinae.

The genus consists of 22 species, 21 from New Zealand and one from New Caledonia.

== Species ==
- Phymatophaea aquila Opitz (2009)
- Phymatophaea atrata Broun
- Phymatophaea auripila
- Phymatophaea breviclava Broun
- Phymatophaea caledonia
- Phymatophaea deirolinea
- Phymatophaea earlyi Opitz (2009)
- Phymatophaea enodis Opitz (2009)
- Phymatophaea fuscitarsis Broun
- Phymatophaea guttigera Waterhouse
- Phymatophaea hudsoni Broun
- Phymatophea ignea Broun (1886)
- Phymatophaea insula Opitz (2009)
- Phymatophaea longula Sharp
- Phymatophaea lugubris Broun
- Phymatophaea maorias Opitz (2009)
- Phymatophaea oconnori Broun
- Phymatophaea opacula Broun
- Phymatophaea opiloides Pascoe
- Phymatophea picta Broun (1881)
- Phymatophaea pustulifera Westwood
- Phymatophaea testacea Broun
- Phymatophaea tracheloglaba
- Phymatophaea watti Opitz (2009)
- Phymatophaea aeraria
- Phymatophaea pantomelas
- Phymatophaea reductipennis
