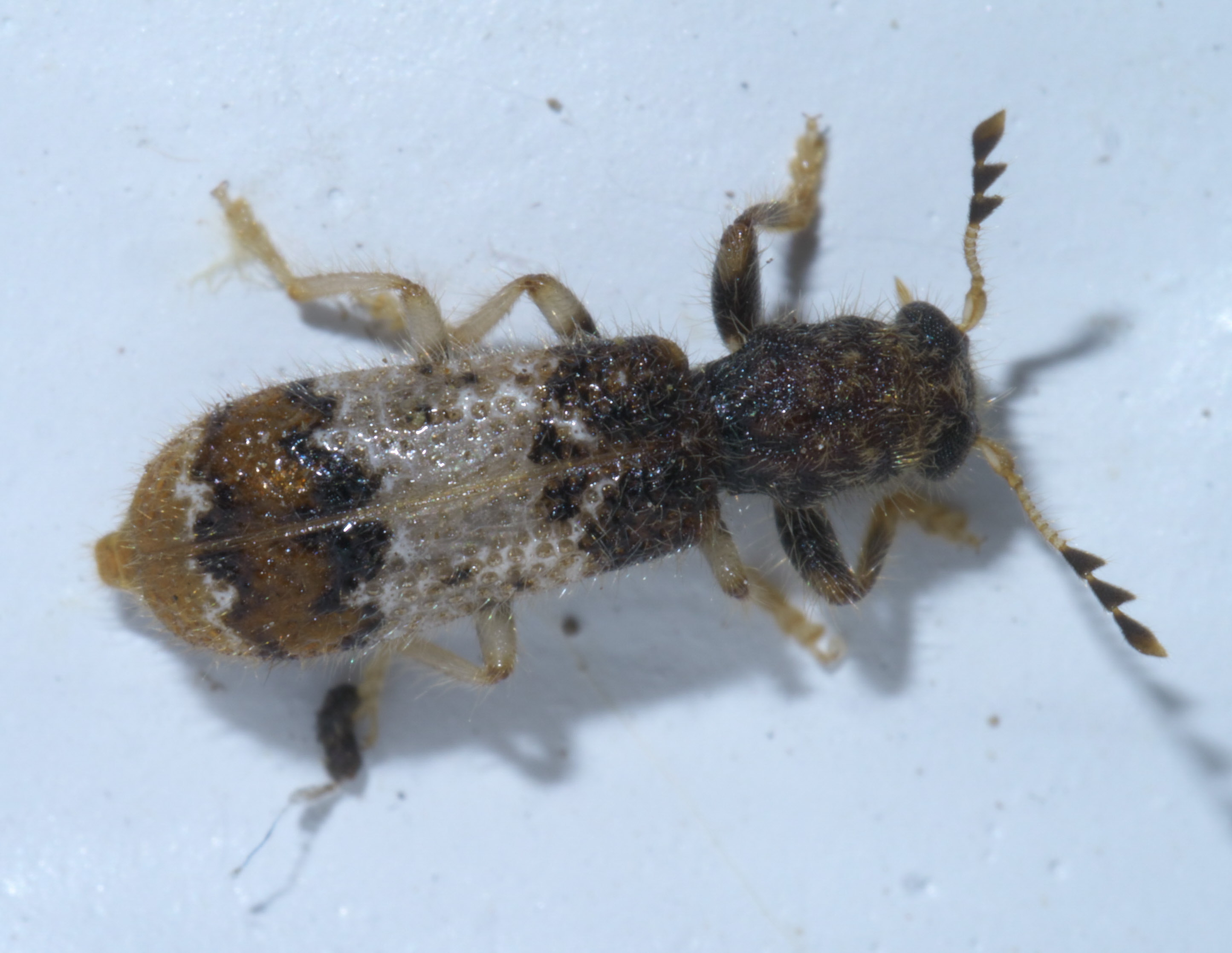

Scientific classification
- Domain: Eukaryota
- Kingdom: Animalia
- Phylum: Arthropoda
- Class: Insecta
- Order: Coleoptera
- Suborder: Polyphaga
- Infraorder: Cucujiformia
- Family: Cleridae
- Genus: Pelonium
- Species: P. leucophaeum

Binomial name
- Pelonium leucophaeum (Klug, 1842)

= Pelonium leucophaeum =

Species of beetle

Pelonium leucophaeum is a species of checkered beetle in the family Cleridae. It is found in Central America and North America.

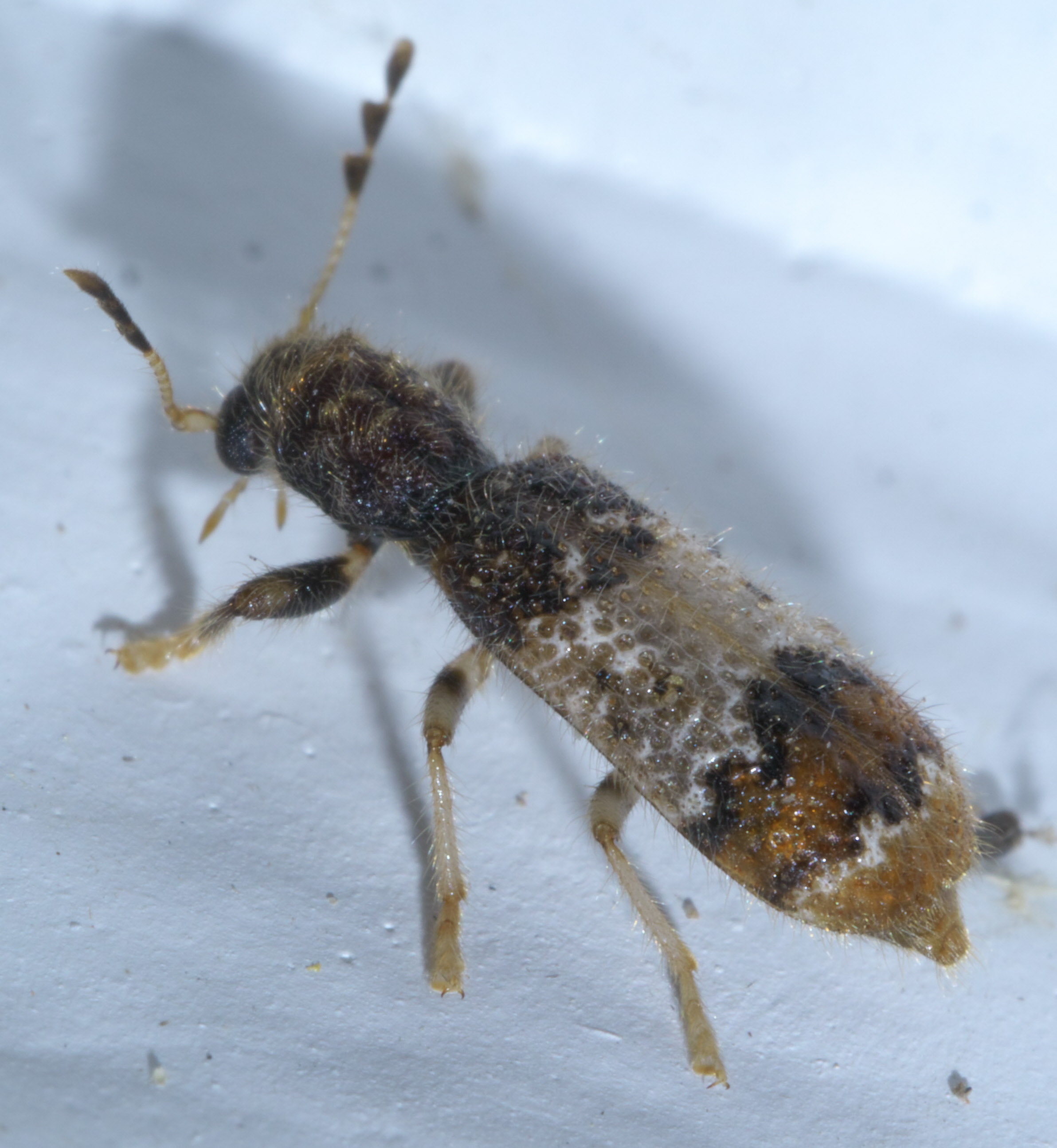
