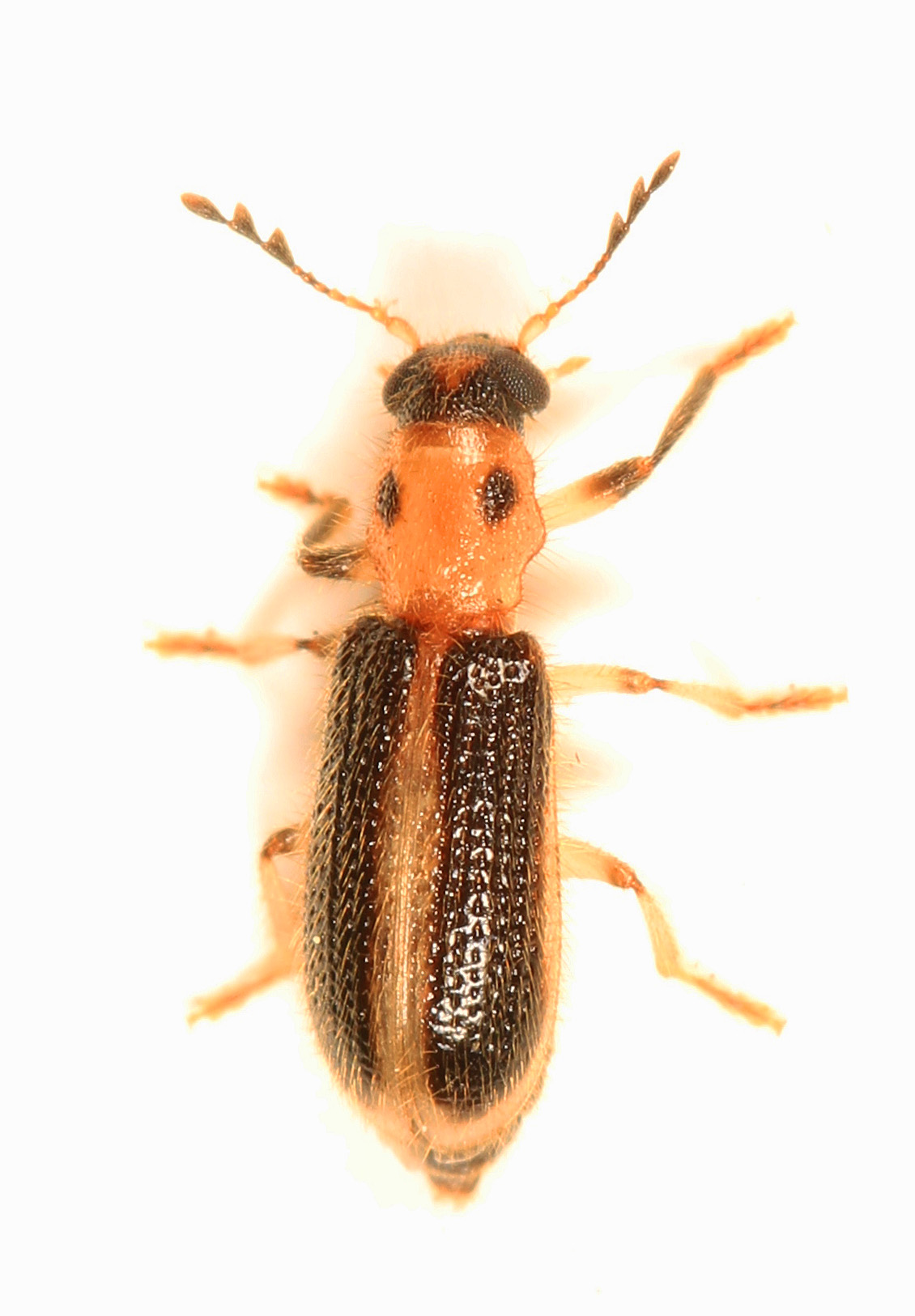

Scientific classification
- Domain: Eukaryota
- Kingdom: Animalia
- Phylum: Arthropoda
- Class: Insecta
- Order: Coleoptera
- Suborder: Polyphaga
- Infraorder: Cucujiformia
- Family: Cleridae
- Genus: Cregya
- Species: C. oculata

Binomial name
- Cregya oculata (Say, 1835)

= Cregya oculata =

Species of beetle

Cregya oculata is a species of checkered beetle in the family Cleridae. It is found in North America.
