= Boschella =

Scientific classification
- Kingdom: Animalia
- Phylum: Arthropoda
- Class: Insecta
- Order: Coleoptera
- Suborder: Polyphaga
- Infraorder: Cucujiformia
- Family: Cleridae
- Subfamily: Enopliinae
- Genus: Boschella; Barr, 1980

Genus of beetles

Boschella is a genus of checkered beetles in the family Cleridae. There is one described species in Boschella, B. fasciata.
