= Pelonides granulatipennis =

Scientific classification
- Domain: Eukaryota
- Kingdom: Animalia
- Phylum: Arthropoda
- Class: Insecta
- Order: Coleoptera
- Suborder: Polyphaga
- Infraorder: Cucujiformia
- Family: Cleridae
- Genus: Pelonides
- Species: P. granulatipennis

Binomial name
- Pelonides granulatipennis (Schaeffer, 1904)

Species of beetle

Pelonides granulatipennis is a species of checkered beetle in the family Cleridae. It is found in Central America and North America.
