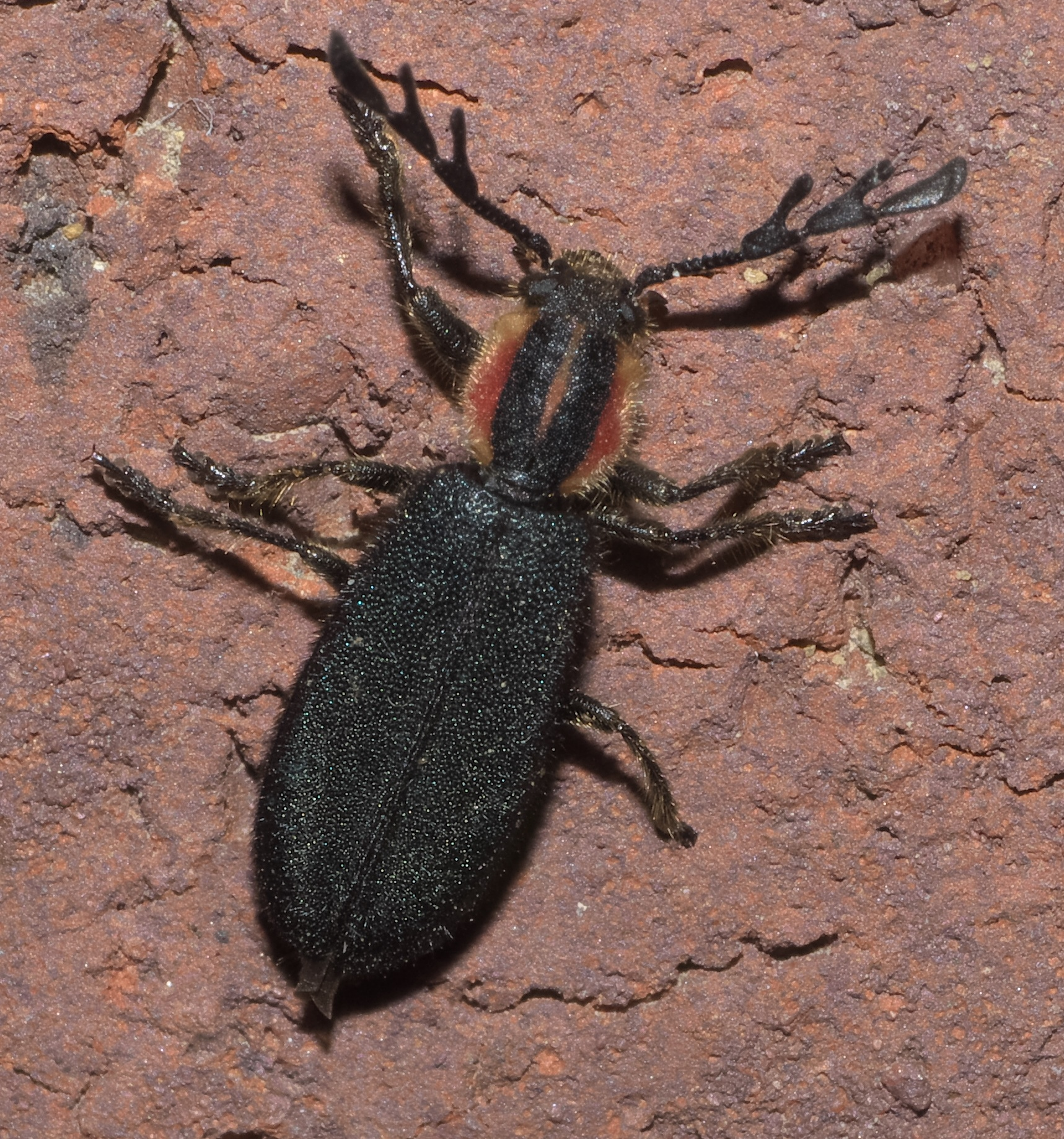
- Chariessa pilosa

Scientific classification
- Kingdom: Animalia
- Phylum: Arthropoda
- Class: Insecta
- Order: Coleoptera
- Suborder: Polyphaga
- Infraorder: Cucujiformia
- Family: Cleridae
- Genus: Chariessa; Perty, 1832

Type species
- Chariessa ramicornis Perty in Spix & Martius, 1832

Synonyms
- Brachymorphus Chevrolat, 1835; Tarandocerus Chevrolat, 1876

= Chariessa =

Genus of beetles

Chariessa is a genus of checkered beetles in the family Cleridae. There are about six described species in Chariessa.

Chariessa beetles are carnivorous and often associated with trees of the genus Quercus, likely due to a preference for lignicolous insects that live in oaks.

== Species ==
These seven species belong to the genus Chariessa:

- Chariessa dichroa (LeConte, 1865) (North America)
- Chariessa elegans Horn, 1878 (North and Central America)
- Chariessa floridana Schaeffer, 1917 (North America)
- Chariessa pilosa (Forster, 1771) (Palearctic, North America)
- Chariessa texana Wolcott, 1908 (North America)
- Chariessa vestita Chevrolat, 1835 (North, Central, and South America)
- Chariessa catalina Optiz, 2017 (North America)
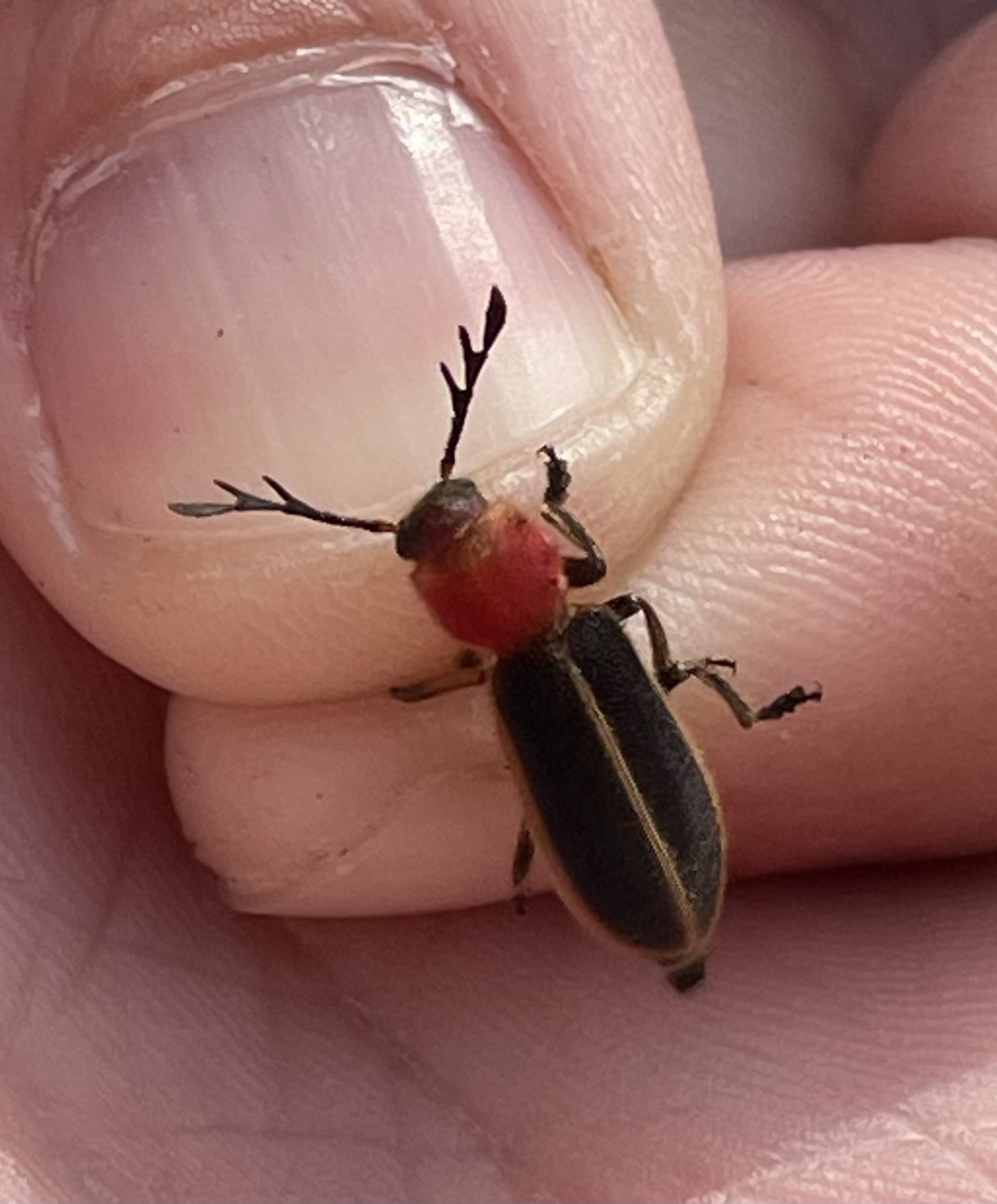
Chariessa texana, Texas

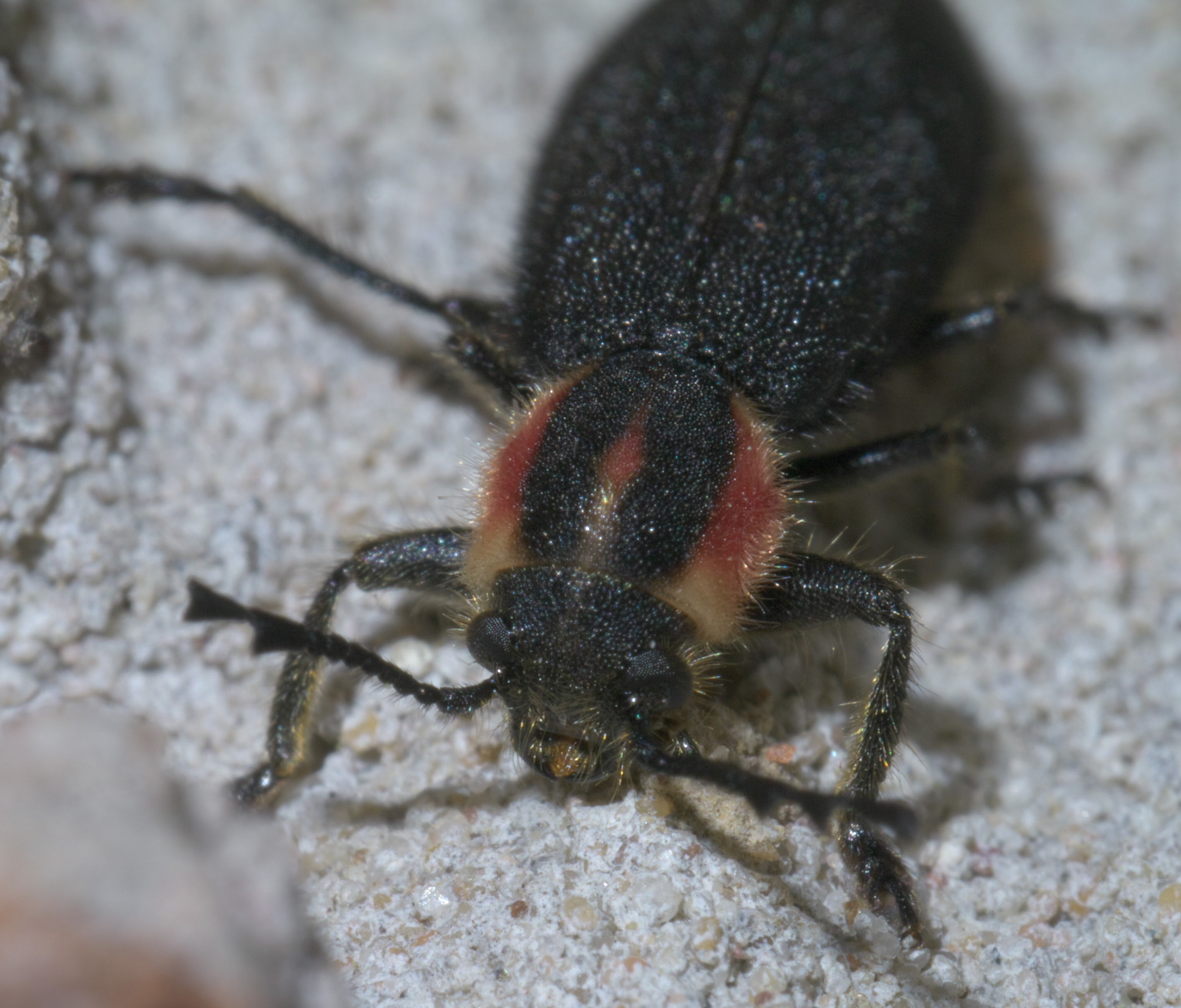
Chariessa pilosa, Oklahoma

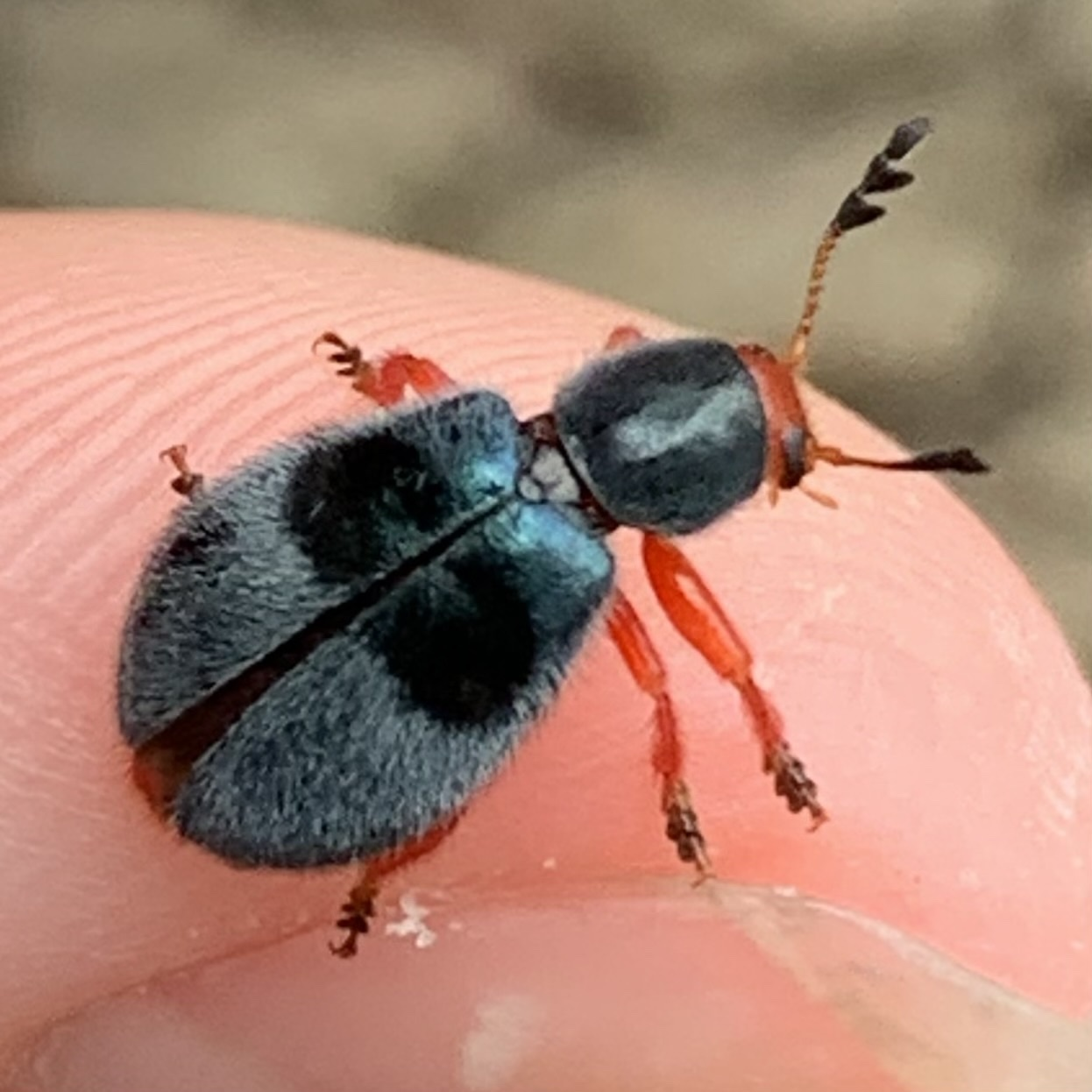
Chariessa vestita, Texas

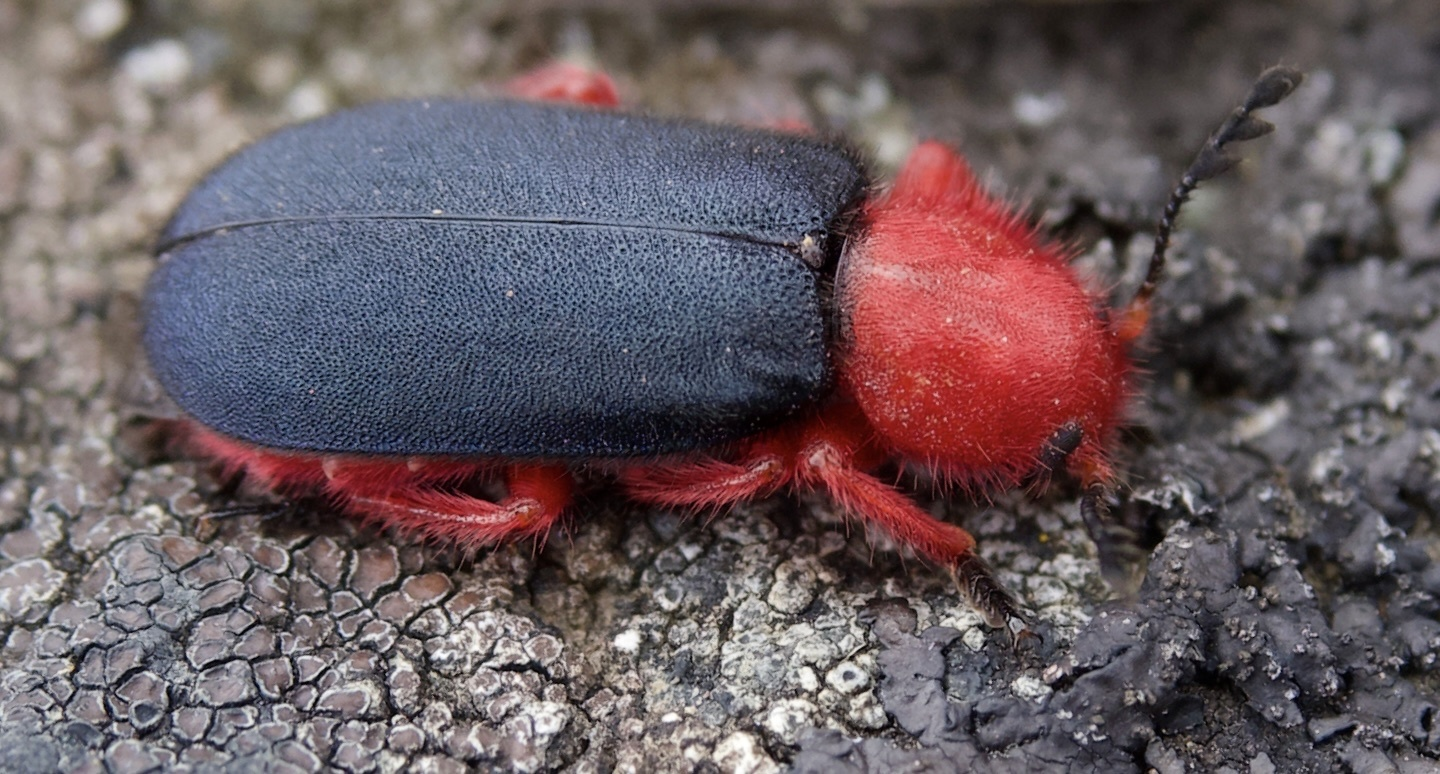
Chariessa catalina, Oregon
