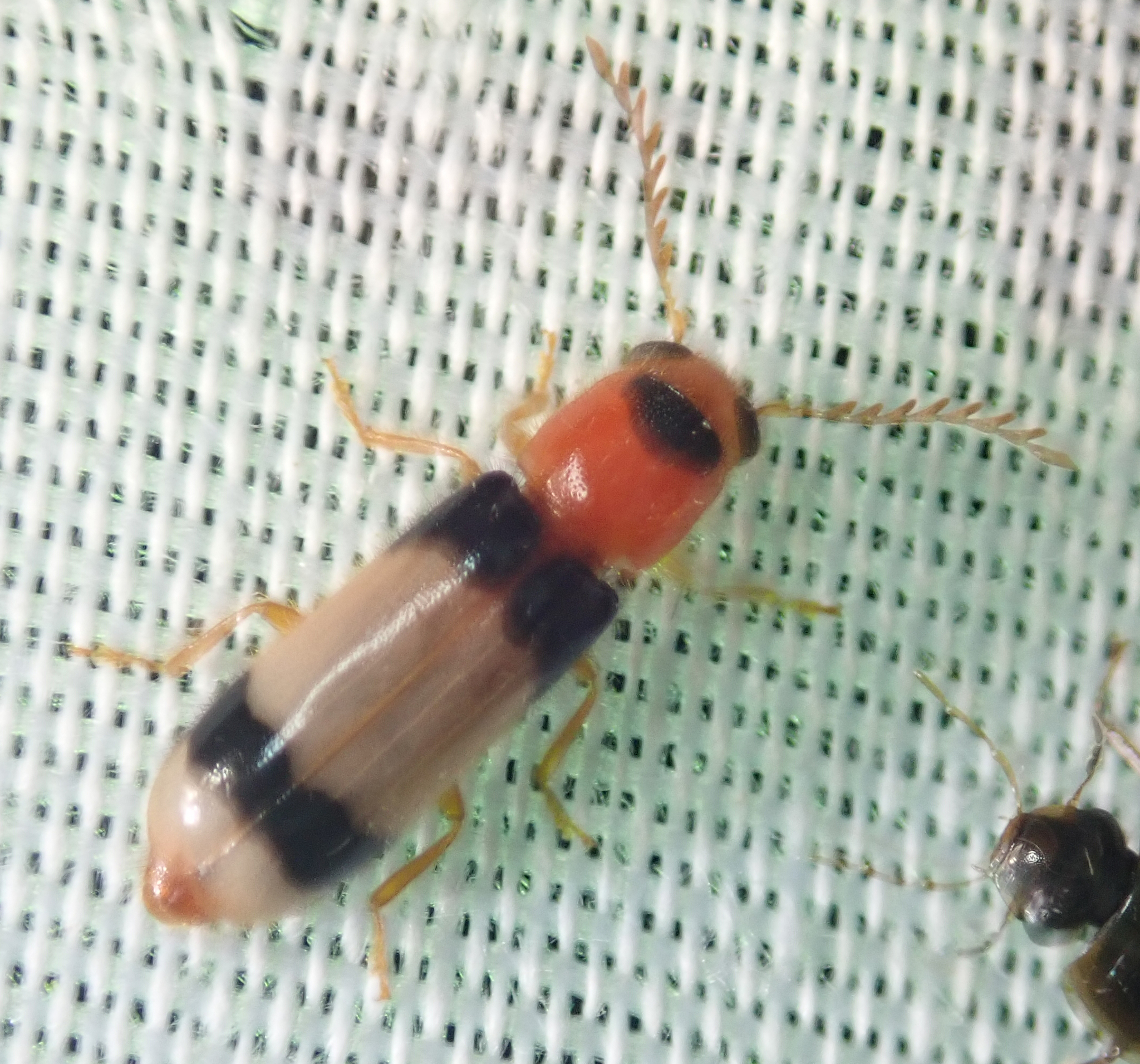
- Tenerus variabilis, Botswana

Scientific classification
- Domain: Eukaryota
- Kingdom: Animalia
- Phylum: Arthropoda
- Class: Insecta
- Order: Coleoptera
- Suborder: Polyphaga
- Infraorder: Cucujiformia
- Family: Cleridae
- Subfamily: Enopliinae
- Genus: Tenerus; Laporte de Castelnau, 1836

= Tenerus (beetle) =

Genus of beetles

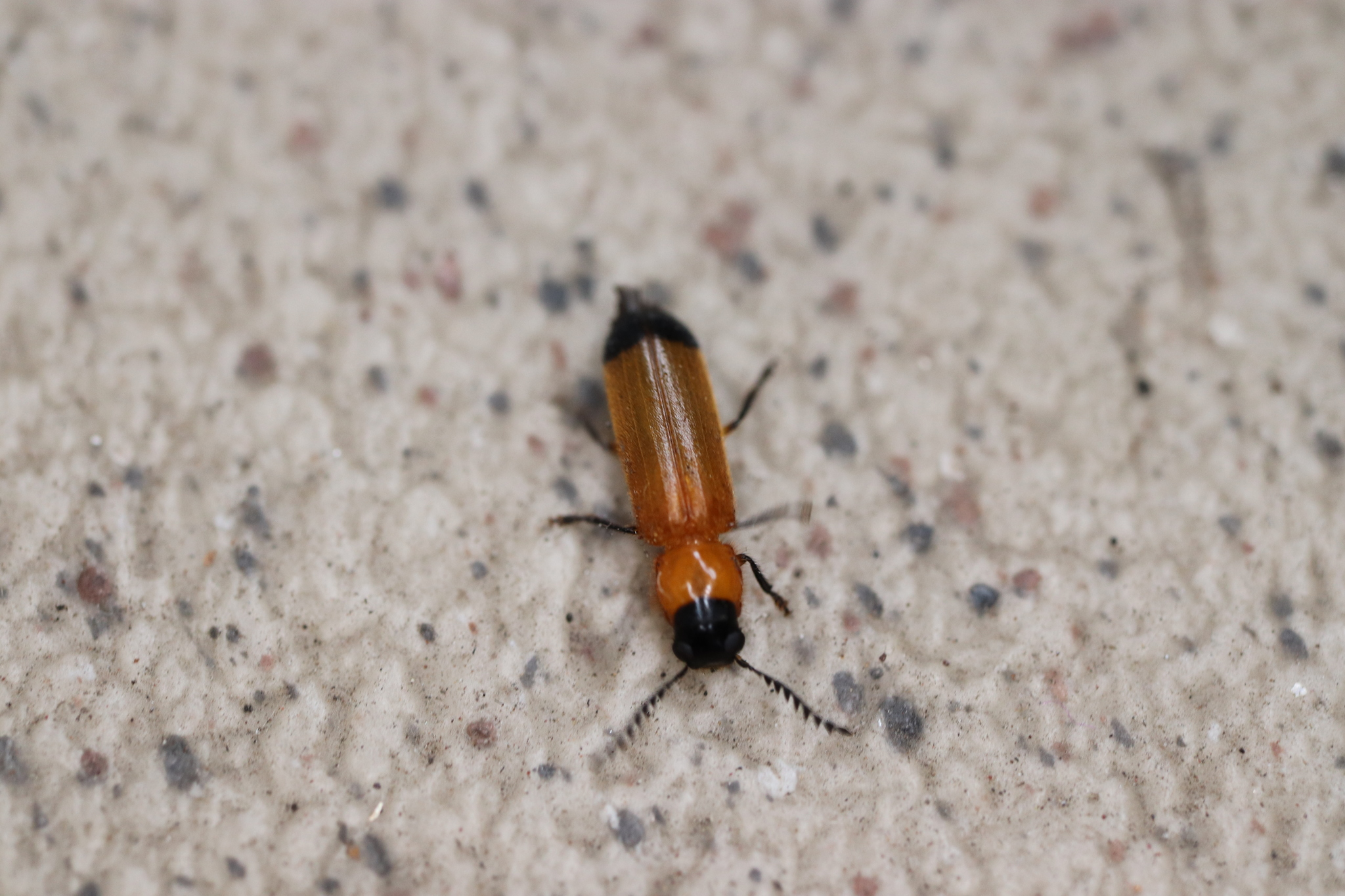
Tenerus hilleri, Japan

Tenerus is a genus of checkered beetles in the subfamily Enopliinae, found in Asia, Africa, and Australia.

== Species ==
These 16 species belong to the genus Tenerus:

- Tenerus acostatus Chapin, 1924
- Tenerus basilanicus Chapin, 1924
- Tenerus dohertyanus Gorham, 1893
- Tenerus femoralis Corporaal, 1939
- Tenerus formosanus Schenkling, 1912
- Tenerus hilleri Harold, 1877
- Tenerus limbatus Corporaal, 1939
- Tenerus luzonicus Chapin, 1924
- Tenerus magnus Chapin, 1924
- Tenerus nigripes Chapin, 1924
- Tenerus obscurus Chapin, 1924
- Tenerus proximus Schenkling, 1908
- Tenerus quadrimaculatus Corporaal, 1926
- Tenerus sibuyanus Chapin, 1924
- Tenerus trinotatus Chapin, 1924
- Tenerus vittiger Chapin, 1924
