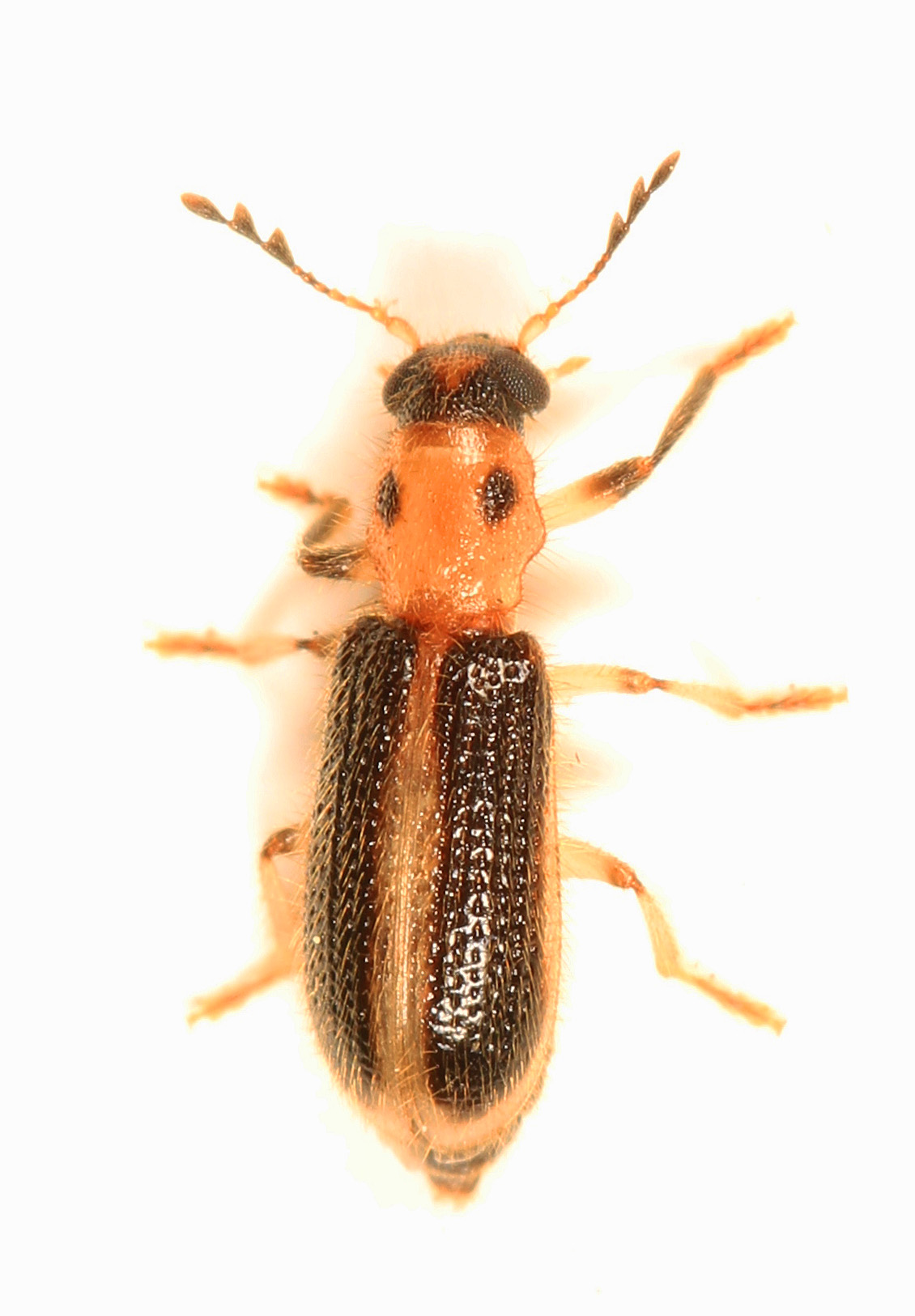
- Cregya oculata

Scientific classification
- Kingdom: Animalia
- Phylum: Arthropoda
- Class: Insecta
- Order: Coleoptera
- Suborder: Polyphaga
- Infraorder: Cucujiformia
- Family: Cleridae
- Genus: Cregya; LeConte, 1861

= Cregya =

Genus of beetles

Cregya is a genus of checkered beetles in the family Cleridae. There are over 100 described species in Cregya.

== Selected species ==
- Cregya mixta (LeConte, 1866)
- Cregya oculata (Say, 1835)
- Cregya quadrinotata (Chevrolat, 1874)
- Cregya quadrisignata (Spinola, 1844)
