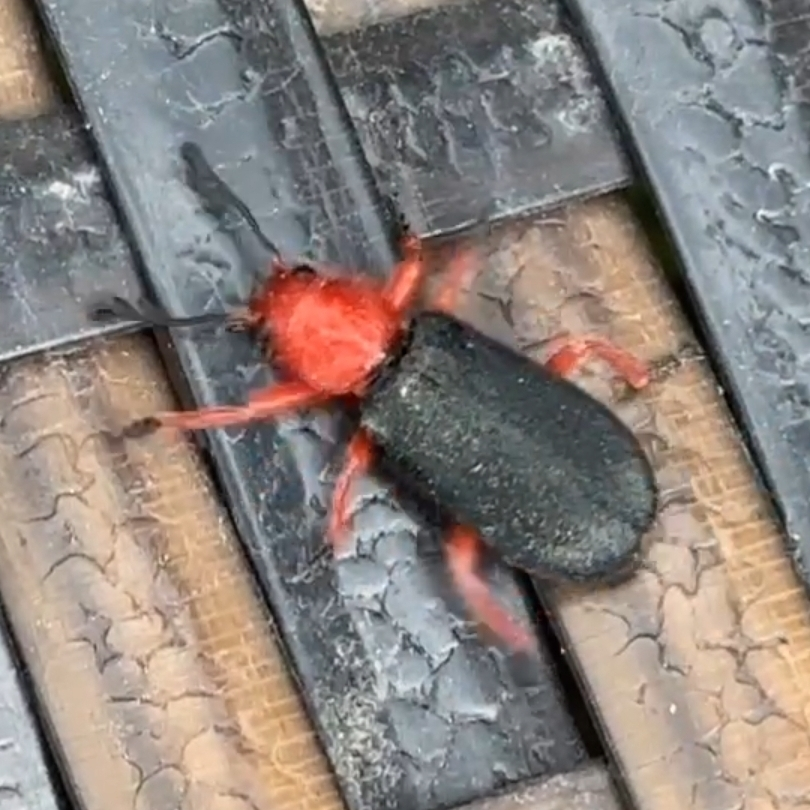

Scientific classification
- Kingdom: Animalia
- Phylum: Arthropoda
- Class: Insecta
- Order: Coleoptera
- Suborder: Polyphaga
- Infraorder: Cucujiformia
- Family: Cleridae
- Genus: Chariessa
- Species: C. elegans

Binomial name
- Chariessa elegans Horn, 1870

= Chariessa elegans =

Species of beetle

Chariessa elegans is a species of checkered beetles in the family Cleridae. It is found in the United States.
