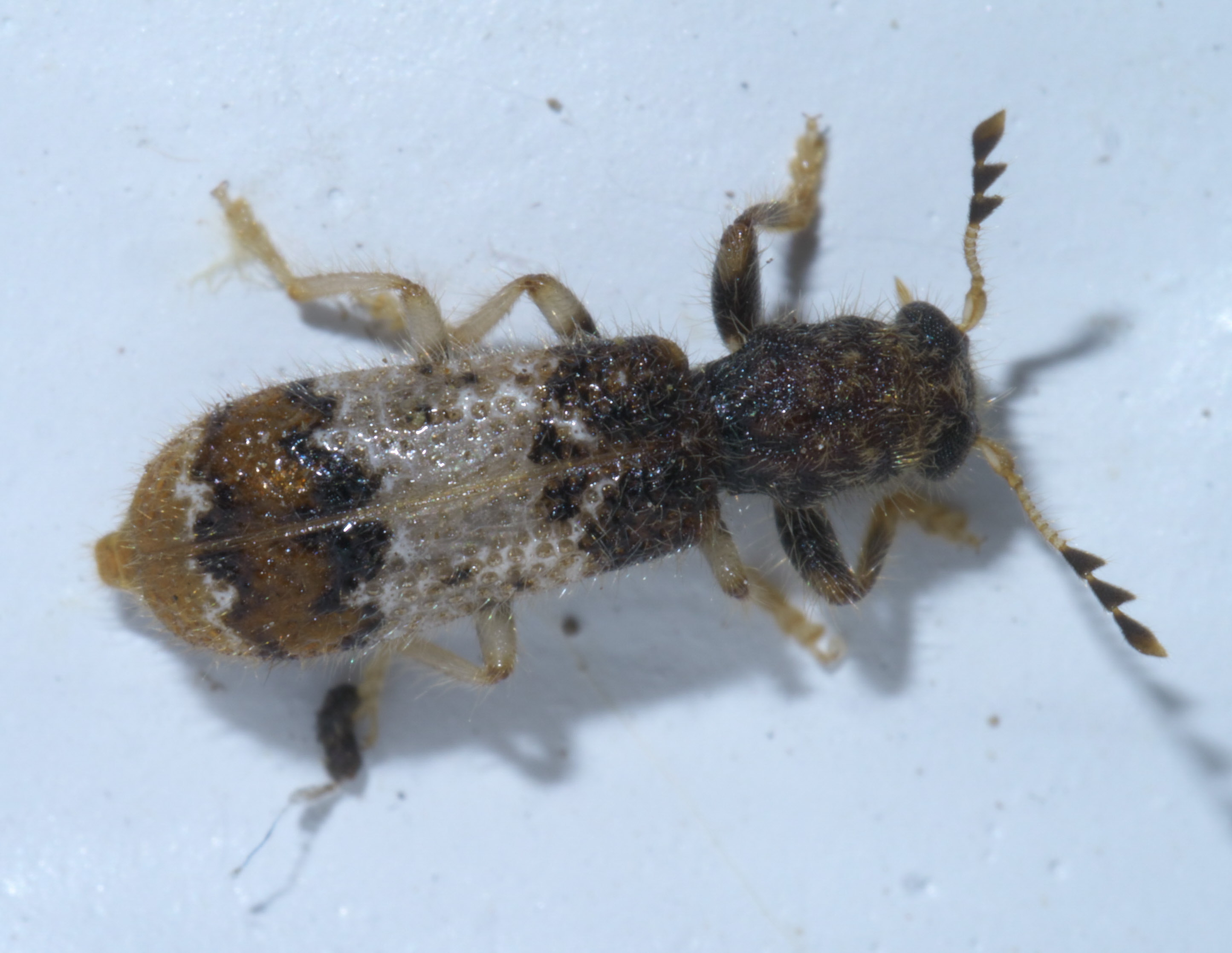
- Pelonium leucophaeum

Scientific classification
- Domain: Eukaryota
- Kingdom: Animalia
- Phylum: Arthropoda
- Class: Insecta
- Order: Coleoptera
- Suborder: Polyphaga
- Infraorder: Cucujiformia
- Family: Cleridae
- Genus: Pelonium; Spinola, 1844

= Pelonium =

Genus of beetles

Pelonium is a genus of checkered beetles in the family Cleridae. There are about 19 described species in Pelonium.

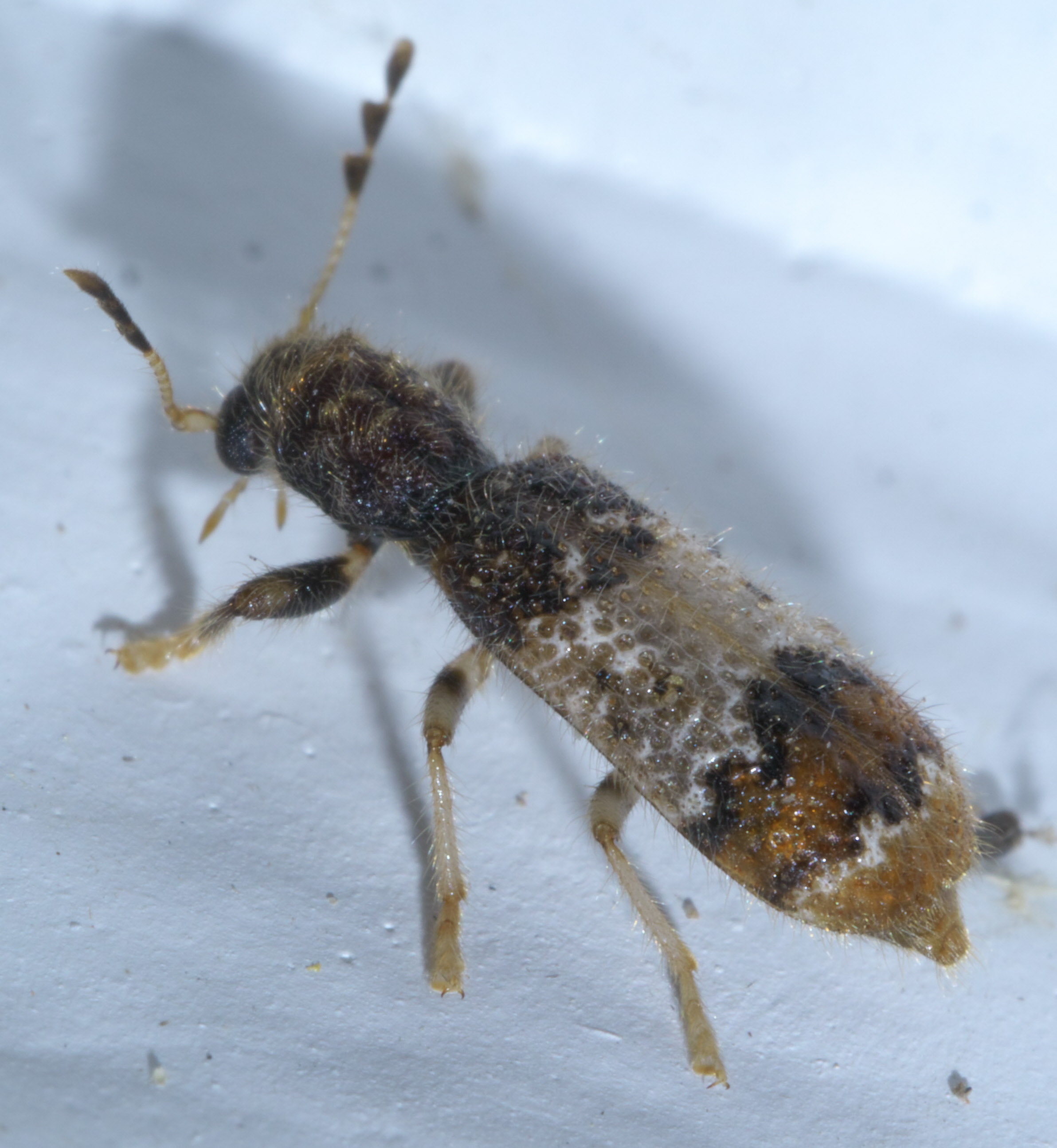
Pelonium leucophaeum

== Species ==
These 19 species belong to the genus Pelonium:

- Pelonium aliciae Barr, 2005
- Pelonium bruchi Schenkling, 1908
- Pelonium carinatum Schenkling, 1908
- Pelonium crinita (Klug, 1842)
- Pelonium disconotatum Pic, 1940
- Pelonium fasciatum (LeConte, 1852)
- Pelonium formosanum Schenkling, 1912
- Pelonium granulosum Wolcott, 1909
- Pelonium guyanensis Chevrolat, 1876
- Pelonium jocosum Schenkling, 1908
- Pelonium leucophaeum (Klug, 1842)
- Pelonium luctuosum Spinola, 1844
- Pelonium maculicolle Schaeffer, 1904
- Pelonium maculiocolle Schaeffer
- Pelonium nigroaeneum Gorham, 1893
- Pelonium nigrosignatum Pic, 1940
- Pelonium peninsulare
- Pelonium scapulare Barr, 2005
- Pelonium tetrasemus (Blackwelder, 1945)
