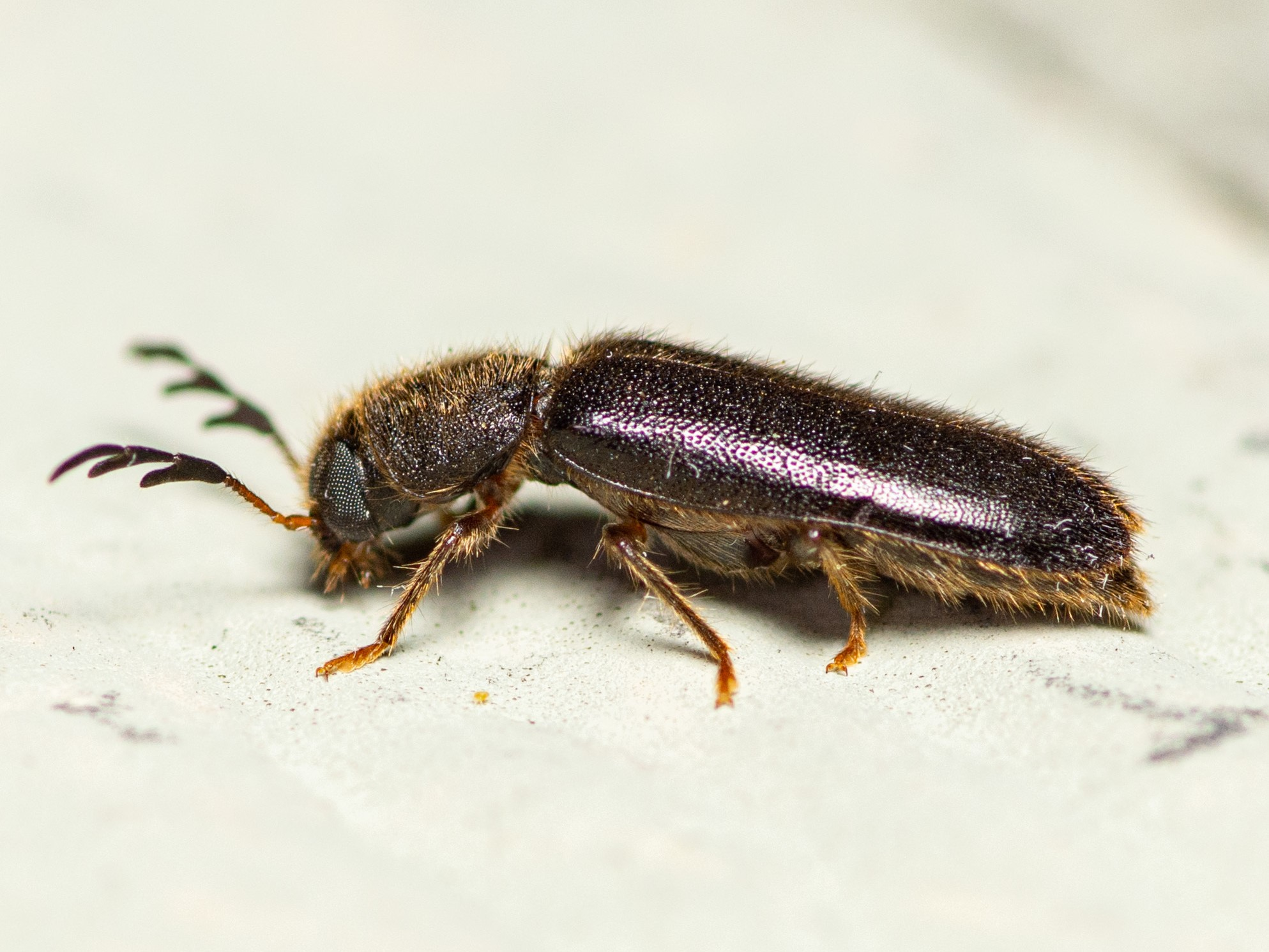
- Neorthopleura texana

Scientific classification
- Domain: Eukaryota
- Kingdom: Animalia
- Phylum: Arthropoda
- Class: Insecta
- Order: Coleoptera
- Suborder: Polyphaga
- Infraorder: Cucujiformia
- Family: Cleridae
- Genus: Neorthopleura; Barr, 1976

= Neorthopleura =

Genus of beetles

Neorthopleura is a genus of checkered beetles in the family Cleridae. There are at least three described species in Neorthopleura.

== Species ==
These three species belong to the genus Neorthopleura:

- Neorthopleura subfasciatum (Chevrolat, 1874)
- Neorthopleura texana (Bland, 1863)
- Neorthopleura thoracica (Say, 1823)
