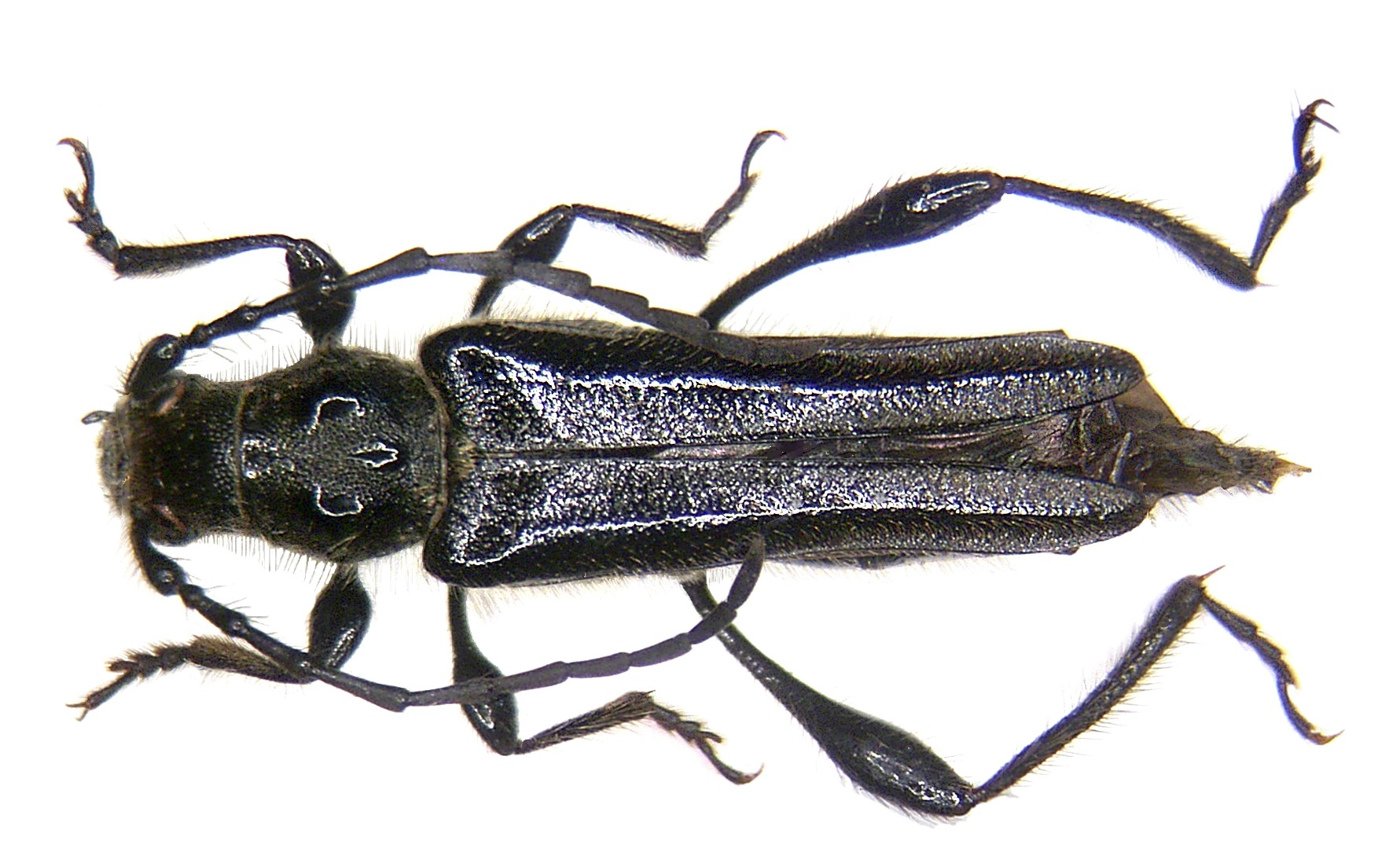
- Stenopterus ater

Scientific classification
- Domain: Eukaryota
- Kingdom: Animalia
- Phylum: Arthropoda
- Class: Insecta
- Order: Coleoptera
- Suborder: Polyphaga
- Infraorder: Cucujiformia
- Family: Cerambycidae
- Subfamily: Cerambycinae
- Tribe: Stenopterini; Gistel, 1848

= Stenopterini =

Tribe of beetles

Stenopterini is a tribe of beetles in the subfamily Cerambycinae, containing the following genera:

- Genus Callimoxys Kraatz, 1863
  - Callimoxys fuscipennis (LeConte, 1861)
  - Callimoxys gracilis Brullé, 1833
  - Callimoxys nigrinus Williams & Hammond, 2011
  - Callimoxys ocularis Hammond & Williams, 2011
  - †Callimoxys primordialis Wickham, 1911 (fossil)
  - Callimoxys pinorum Casey, 1924
  - Callimoxys retusifer Holzschuh, 1999
  - Callimoxys sanguinicollis (Olivier, 1795)
- Genus Callimus Mulsant, 1846
- Genus Guerryus Pic, 1903
- Genus Holangus Pic, 1902
- Genus Kunbir Lameere, 1890
- Genus Merionoeda Pascoe, 1858
- Genus Microdebilissa Pic, 1925
- Genus Obscuropterus Adlbauer, 2003
  - Obscuropterus melanargyreus (White, 1855)
- Genus Stenopterus Illiger, 1804
  - Stenopterus adlbaueri Sama, 1995
  - Stenopterus ater Linnaeus, 1767
  - Stenopterus atricornis Pic, 1891
  - Stenopterus creticus Sama, 1995
  - Stenopterus flavicornis Küster, 1846
  - Stenopterus kraatzi Pic, 1892
  - Stenopterus mauritanicus Lucas, 1847
  - Stenopterus rufus Linnaeus, 1767
  - Stenopterus similatus Holzschuh, 1979
