= Oxycoleini =

Scientific classification
- Kingdom: Animalia
- Phylum: Arthropoda
- Clade: Pancrustacea
- Class: Insecta
- Order: Coleoptera
- Suborder: Polyphaga
- Infraorder: Cucujiformia
- Family: Cerambycidae
- Subfamily: Cerambycinae
- Tribe: Oxycoleini; Martins & Galileo, 2003

Tribe of beetles

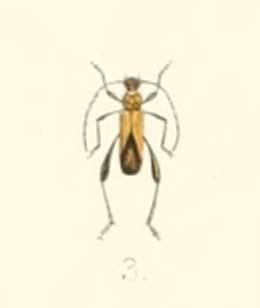
Merionoeda flavipennis

Oxycoleini is a tribe of beetles in the subfamily Cerambycinae, now placed in the Stenopterini.

It contained the following genera and species:

- Genus Equescollum
- Genus Oxycoleus
  - Oxycoleus bicolor (Melzer, 1934)
  - Oxycoleus brasiliensis (Tippmann, 1953)
  - Oxycoleus carinatipennis (Zajciw, 1964)
  - Oxycoleus clavipes Lacordaire, 1869
  - Oxycoleus culicinus (Bates, 1870)
  - Oxycoleus cyaneus Martins & Galileo, 2005
  - Oxycoleus flavipes Martins & Galileo, 2006
  - Oxycoleus gahani (Gounelle, 1911)
  - Oxycoleus gratiosus (Bates, 1885)
  - Oxycoleus laetus Julio, 1997
  - Oxycoleus obscurus Julio, 1997
  - Oxycoleus piceus Giesbert, 1993
  - Oxycoleus ruficollis (Zajciw, 1964)
  - Oxycoleus tristis (Melzer, 1933)
- Genus Oxylopsebus
  - Oxylopsebus brachypterus Clarke, 2008
- Genus Tethlimmena
- Genus Wappesia
