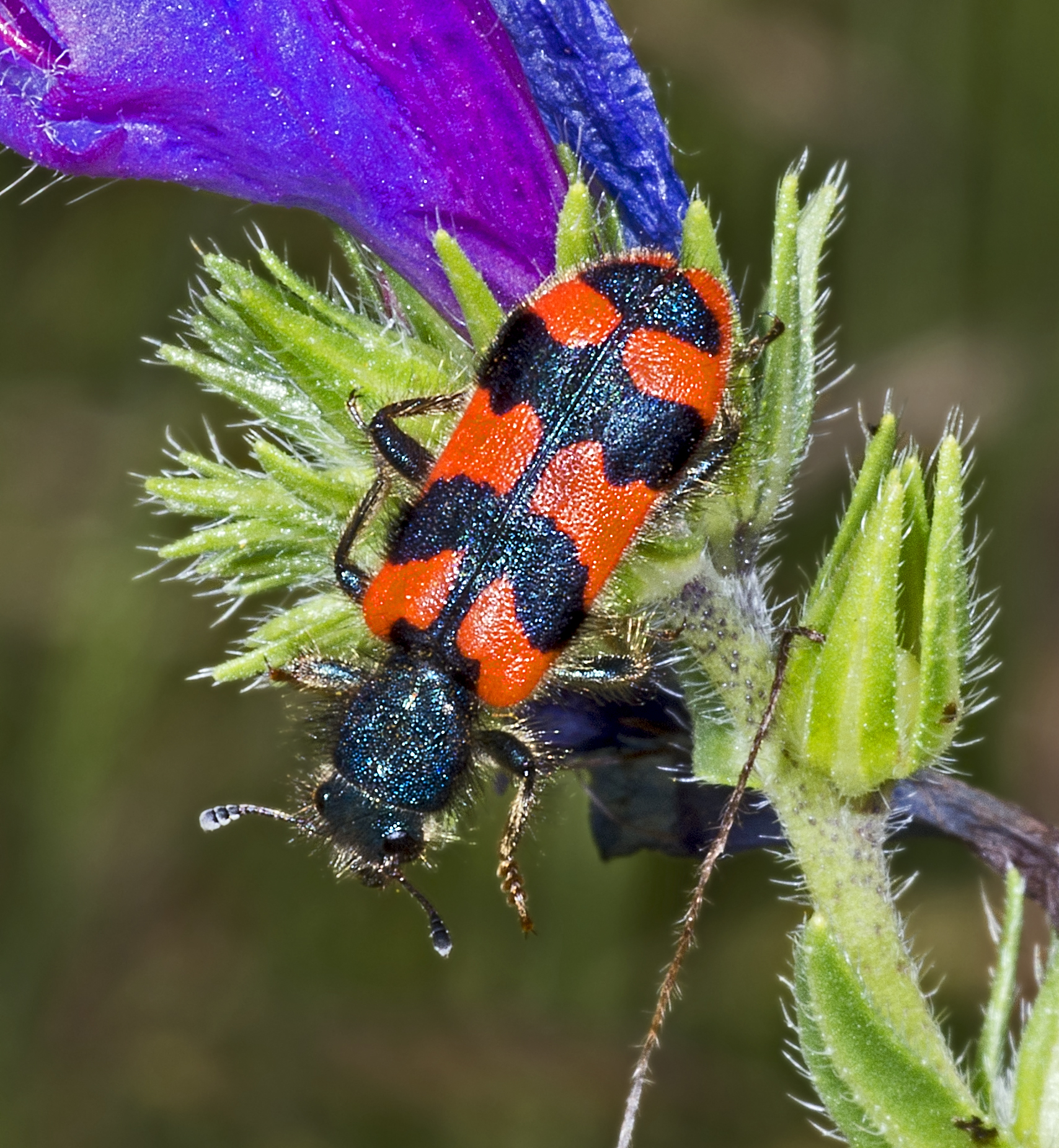

Scientific classification
- Kingdom: Animalia
- Phylum: Arthropoda
- Class: Insecta
- Order: Coleoptera
- Suborder: Polyphaga
- Infraorder: Cucujiformia
- Family: Cleridae
- Genus: Trichodes
- Species: T. alvearius

Binomial name
- Trichodes alvearius (Fabricius, 1792)

Synonyms
- Clerus alvearius Fabricius, 1792

= Trichodes alvearius =

Species of beetle

Trichodes alvearius is a species of soldier or checkered beetle belonging to the family Cleridae, subfamily Clerinae.

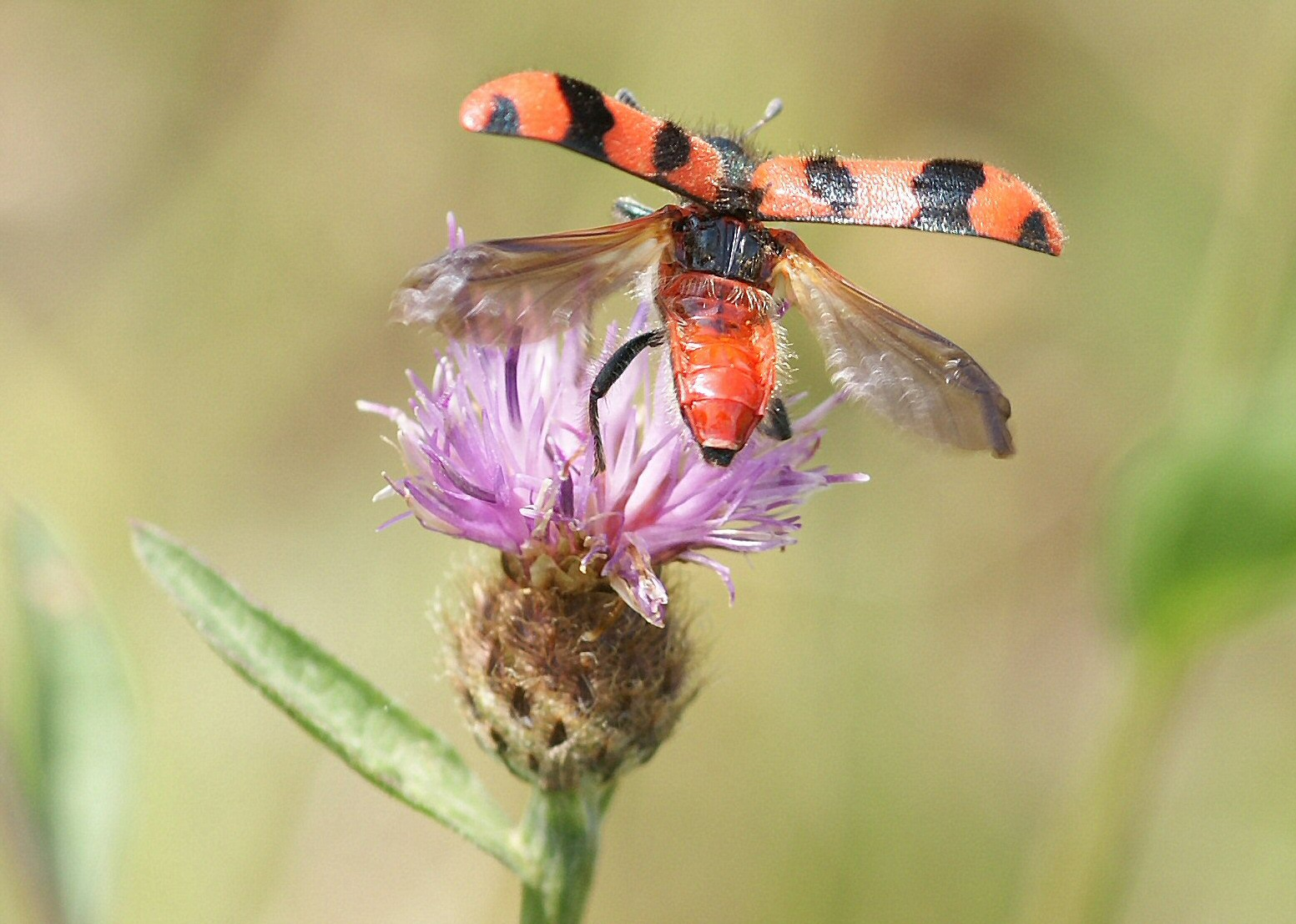
Soldier Beetle Trichodes alvearius taking off from a Knapweed flower, showing its bright warning coloration

== Description ==
Trichodes alvearius is a very hairy beetle with black head and scutellum. The elongated elytra show a bright red colour with black bands. This species can easily be distinguished from Trichodes apiarius by the black stripe down the middle of the back (along the inner edge of the elytra) and the red apex, not reached by the black terminal stain. It does not fly readily, relying instead on its warning coloration to protect itself from predators.

== Distribution ==
These beetles are widely distributed across southern Europe in Albania, Czech Republic, Italy, Greece, France, Germany, Hungary, Poland, Spain, Switzerland, the western half of the Balkans, and in North Africa. The species became extinct in England in the nineteenth century.

== Life cycle ==
At the larval stage they are parasites of several species of bees and wasps, as the adults lay the eggs close to hymenopteran nests or hives (hence the name “alvearius”, the bee-hive beetle), eating various stages of their victims.

The adults can be encountered from May through August on the flowers, mainly Apiaceae, Asteraceae and Crataegus species, feeding on pollen. However, they integrate their diet with small insects that they actively hunt, especially Oedemera, Psilothrix, Stenopterus and Clytus species.
