= Trichodes olivieri =

Scientific classification
- Domain: Eukaryota
- Kingdom: Animalia
- Phylum: Arthropoda
- Class: Insecta
- Order: Coleoptera
- Suborder: Polyphaga
- Infraorder: Cucujiformia
- Family: Cleridae
- Genus: Trichodes
- Species: T. olivieri

Binomial name
- Trichodes olivieri Chevrolat, 1843

Synonyms
- Clerus olivieri Chevrolat, 1843; Trichodes bipunctatus Reitter, 1894; Trichodes doriae Baudi, 1873

Species of beetle

Trichodes olivieri is a beetle species of checkered beetles belonging to the family Cleridae, subfamily Clerinae. It can be found in European part of Turkey, Greece, and Near East.
