= Trichodes crabroniformis =

Scientific classification
- Kingdom: Animalia
- Phylum: Arthropoda
- Clade: Pancrustacea
- Class: Insecta
- Order: Coleoptera
- Suborder: Polyphaga
- Infraorder: Cucujiformia
- Family: Cleridae
- Genus: Trichodes
- Species: T. crabroniformis

Binomial name
- Trichodes crabroniformis (Fabricius, 1787)

Synonyms
- Clerus crabroniformis Fabricius, 1787; Trichodes humeralis Muller, 1902; Trichodes zebra Chevrolat, 1874; Trichodes gulo Chevrolat, 1874; Clerus lepidus Brullé, 1832

Species of beetle

Trichodes crabroniformis is a beetle species of checkered beetles belonging to the family Cleridae, subfamily Clerinae. It can be found on Sicily and Crete, as well as in Near East, Kosovo, Montenegro, Serbia, and Voivodina.
