= Oxycoleus tristis =

Scientific classification
- Kingdom: Animalia
- Phylum: Arthropoda
- Class: Insecta
- Order: Coleoptera
- Suborder: Polyphaga
- Infraorder: Cucujiformia
- Family: Cerambycidae
- Genus: Oxycoleus
- Species: O. tristis

Binomial name
- Oxycoleus tristis (Melzer, 1933)

Species of beetle

Oxycoleus tristis is a species of beetle in the family Cerambycidae. It was described by Melzer in 1933.
