= Trichodes simulator =

Scientific classification
- Kingdom: Animalia
- Phylum: Arthropoda
- Class: Insecta
- Order: Coleoptera
- Suborder: Polyphaga
- Infraorder: Cucujiformia
- Family: Cleridae
- Genus: Trichodes
- Species: T. simulator

Binomial name
- Trichodes simulator Horn, 1880

Species of beetle

Trichodes simulator is a species of checkered beetle in the family Cleridae. It is found in North America.
