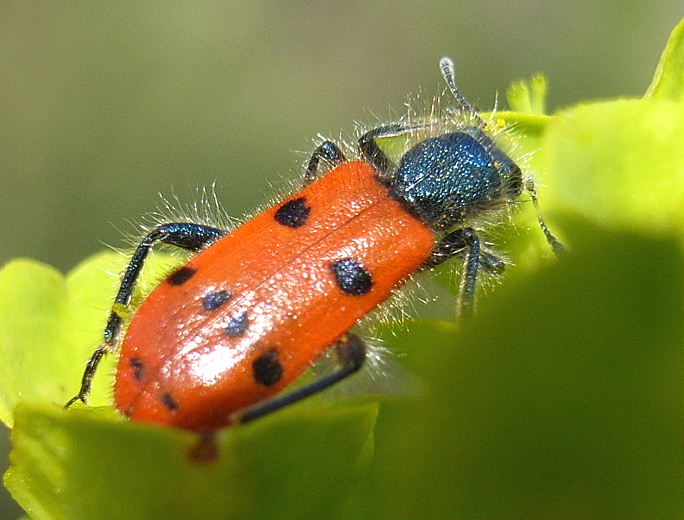

Scientific classification
- Kingdom: Animalia
- Phylum: Arthropoda
- Clade: Pancrustacea
- Class: Insecta
- Order: Coleoptera
- Suborder: Polyphaga
- Infraorder: Cucujiformia
- Family: Cleridae
- Genus: Trichodes
- Species: T. octopunctatus

Binomial name
- Trichodes octopunctatus (Fabricius, 1787)

Synonyms
- Clerus octopunctatus Fabricius, 1787; Attelabus octomaculatus De Villers, 1789; Clerus sexpunctatus Rey, 1891; Trichodes sexpustulatus De Barros, 1929; Attelabus maculatus De Villers, 1789; Trichodes quadrimaculatus Kraatz, 1894

= Trichodes octopunctatus =

Species of beetle

Trichodes octopunctatus is a beetle species of checkered beetles belonging to the family Cleridae, subfamily Clerinae. It can be found in Italy, Spain, and Balearic Islands.
