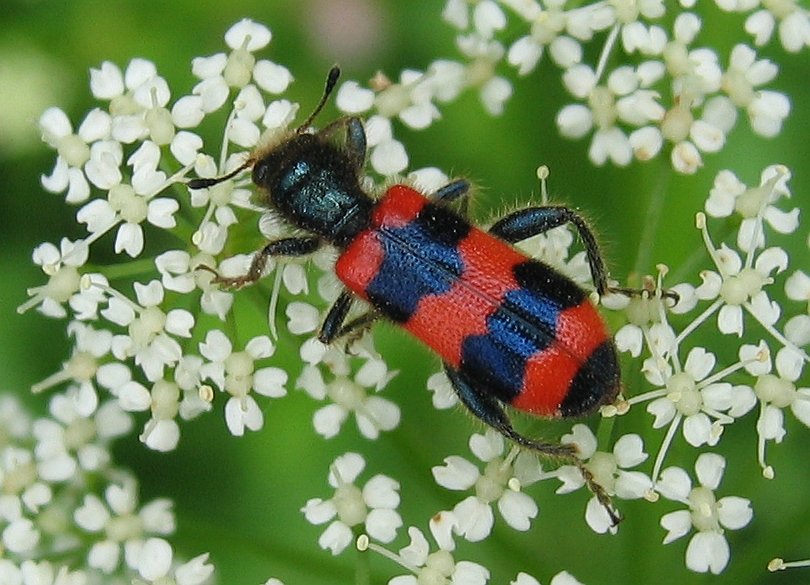

Scientific classification
- Kingdom: Animalia
- Phylum: Arthropoda
- Class: Insecta
- Order: Coleoptera
- Suborder: Polyphaga
- Infraorder: Cucujiformia
- Family: Cleridae
- Genus: Trichodes
- Species: T. apiarius

Binomial name
- Trichodes apiarius (Linnaeus, 1758)

Synonyms
- Trichodes angusticollis Pic, 1902; Trichodes apicita Spinola, 1844; Trichodes apivore Walckenaer, 1802; Trichodes corallinus Ménétriés, 1832; Trichodes crassipedarius Chevrolat, 1876; Trichodes elegans Spinola, 1844; Trichodes georgianus Chevrolat, 1874; Trichodes pannonicus Spinola, 1844; Trichodes suturalis Trella, 1924; Trichodes suturifer Corporaal, 1932

= Trichodes apiarius =

Species of beetle

Trichodes apiarius is a beetle species of checkered beetles belonging to the family Cleridae, subfamily Clerinae. It is found in most of Europe, in the eastern Palearctic realm, and in North Africa.

The adult is a hairy, small beetle with shining blue or black head and scutellum. The elongated elytra (wing cases) are bright red with black bands. This species can easily be distinguished from Trichodes alvearius for the black terminal band reaching the apex of the elytra. Adults grow up to 9–16 millimetres (0.35–0.63 in) and can be encountered from May through June on the flowers, mainly Apiaceae, feeding on the pollen. They also actively hunt small insects.

The larvae are parasites of bees (hence the name “apiarius”), as the adults lay the eggs in the nests of solitary bees (Osmia and Megachile species) or in hives of honey bees, eating larvae and nymphs.
