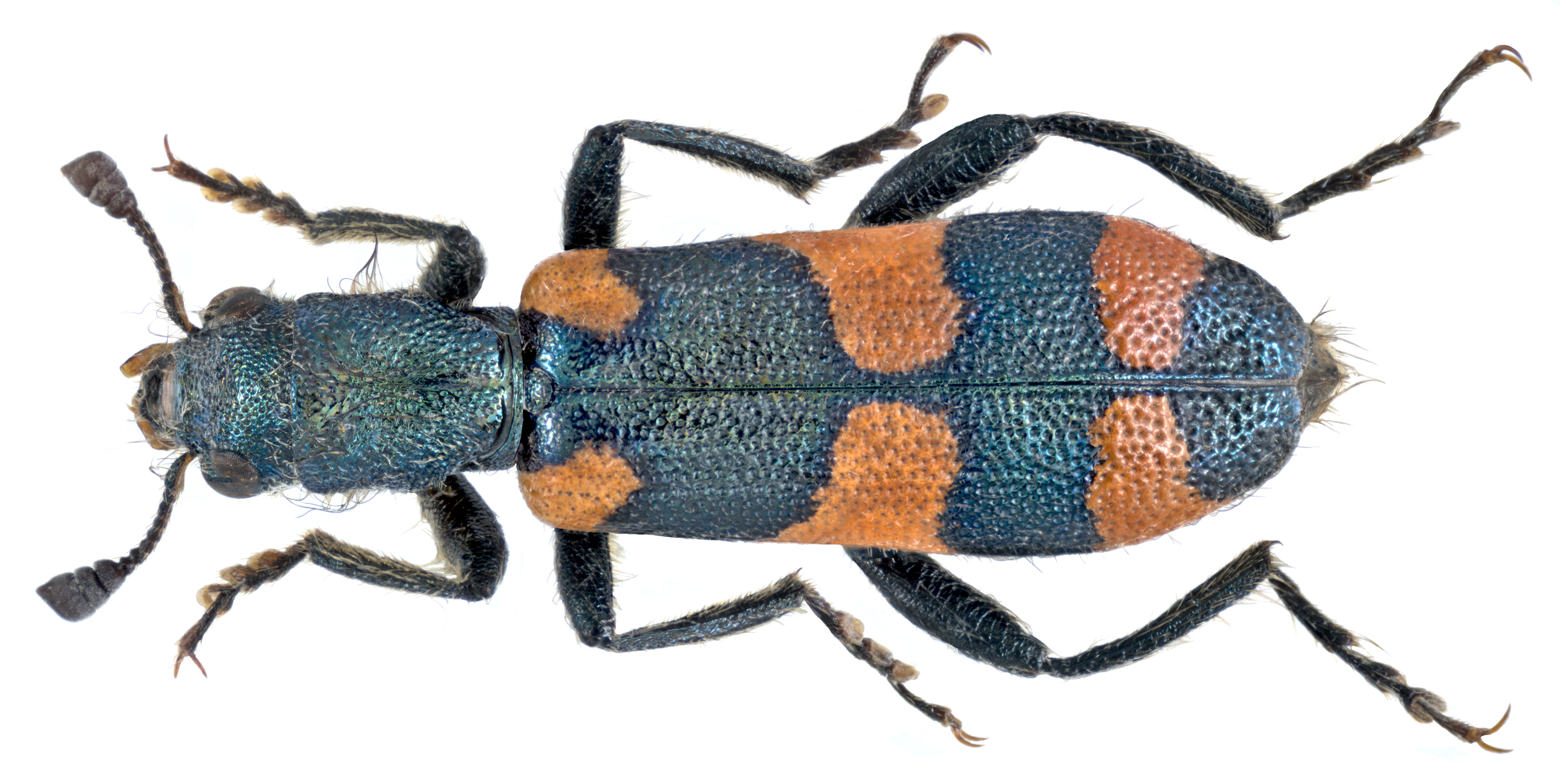
- Trichodes punctatus, Iran

Scientific classification
- Kingdom: Animalia
- Phylum: Arthropoda
- Clade: Pancrustacea
- Class: Insecta
- Order: Coleoptera
- Suborder: Polyphaga
- Infraorder: Cucujiformia
- Family: Cleridae
- Subfamily: Clerinae
- Genus: Trichodes
- Species: T. punctatus

Binomial name
- Trichodes punctatus Fischer von Waldheim, 1829

= Trichodes punctatus =

Species of beetle

Trichodes punctatus is a species of checkered beetle in the family Cleridae. It is found mainly in southeastern Europe.
