= Trichodes peninsularis =

Scientific classification
- Kingdom: Animalia
- Phylum: Arthropoda
- Class: Insecta
- Order: Coleoptera
- Suborder: Polyphaga
- Infraorder: Cucujiformia
- Family: Cleridae
- Genus: Trichodes
- Species: T. peninsularis

Binomial name
- Trichodes peninsularis Horn, 1894

Synonyms
- Trichodes basalis Van Dyke, 1943; Trichodes horni Wolcott and Chapin, 1918

Species of beetle

Trichodes peninsularis is a species of checkered beetle in the family Cleridae. It is found in Central America and North America.

== Subspecies ==
These two subspecies belong to the species Trichodes peninsularis:

- Trichodes peninsularis basalis
- Trichodes peninsularis horni
