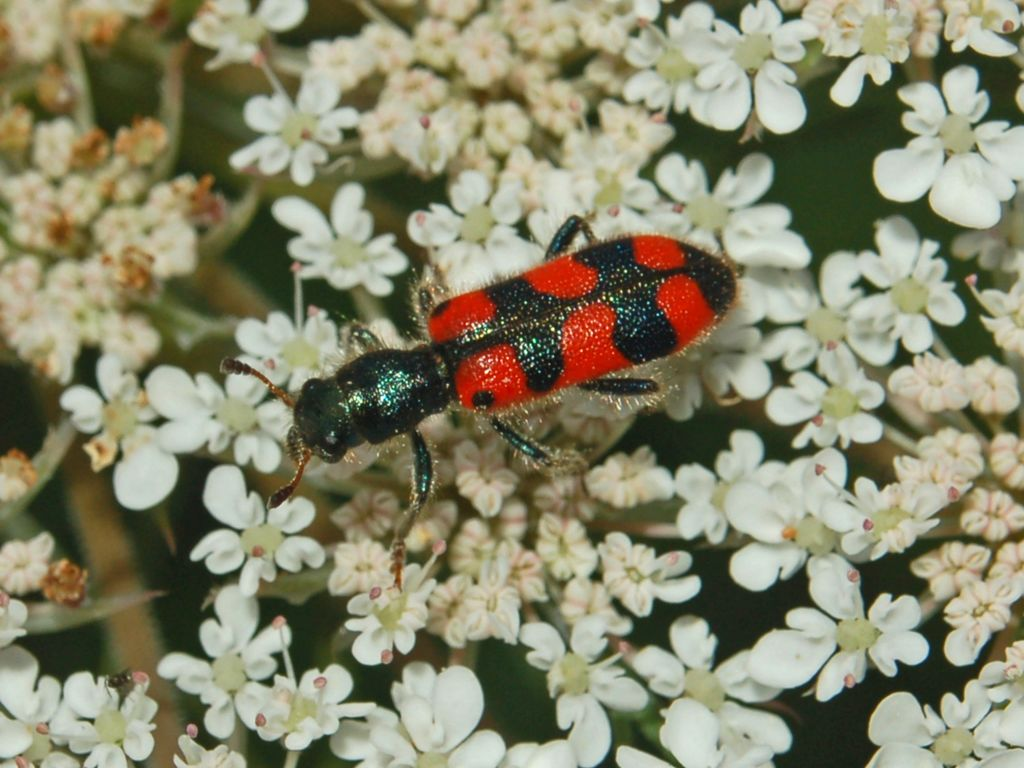

Scientific classification
- Kingdom: Animalia
- Phylum: Arthropoda
- Clade: Pancrustacea
- Class: Insecta
- Order: Coleoptera
- Suborder: Polyphaga
- Infraorder: Cucujiformia
- Family: Cleridae
- Genus: Trichodes
- Species: T. leucopsideus

Binomial name
- Trichodes leucopsideus (Olivier, 1795)

= Trichodes leucopsideus =

Species of beetle

Trichodes leucopsideus is a species of checkered beetle belonging to the family Cleridae, subfamily Clerinae.

== Description ==
It is a hairy small-medium size beetle with shining blue or black head and scutellum. The elongated elytra show a bright reddish orange colour with black bands. This species can easily be distinguished from other Trichodes species by the two small black spots in front of the elytra.

== Distribution ==
These beetles are found in France, Italy, Spain, Germany, Portugal and in North Africa.

== Ecology ==
At the larval stage these beetles are parasites of bees, as the females lay the eggs in the nests of wild bees or in hives of honey bees. After hatching larvae feed on larvae and nymphs of their victims.

The adults grow up to 10–15 millimetres (0.39–0.59 in) and can be encountered from May through July on the flowers, mainly Apiaceae, feeding on the pollen. However, they integrate their diet with small insects that they actively hunt.
