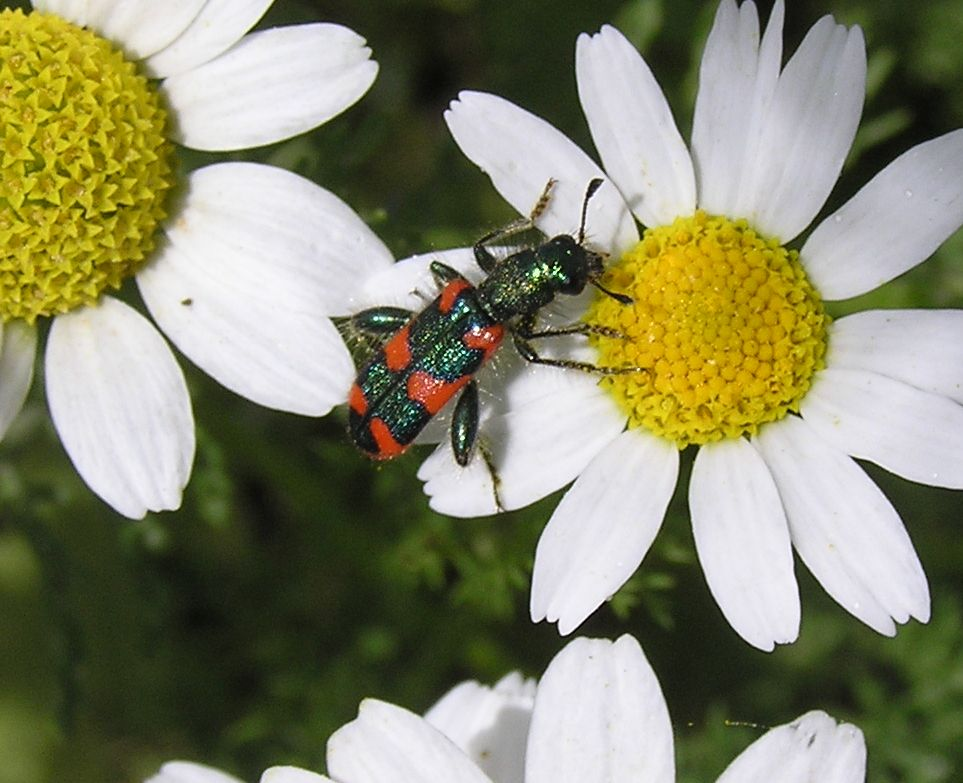

Scientific classification
- Domain: Eukaryota
- Kingdom: Animalia
- Phylum: Arthropoda
- Class: Insecta
- Order: Coleoptera
- Suborder: Polyphaga
- Infraorder: Cucujiformia
- Family: Cleridae
- Genus: Trichodes
- Species: T. nobilis

Binomial name
- Trichodes nobilis Klug, 1842

Synonyms
- Clerus reitteri Champenois, 1900; Trichodes carceli Chevrolat, 1843; Trichodes consanguineus Kraatz, 1894; Trichodes sanguineosignatus Reitter, 1894; Trichodes affinis Spinola, 1844; Trichodes illustris Spinola, 1844; Trichodes latifasciatus Spinola, 1844; Trichodes sanguineosignatus Spinola, 1844

= Trichodes nobilis =

Species of beetle

Trichodes nobilis is a beetle species of checkered beetles belonging to the family Cleridae, subfamily Clerinae. It can be found on Crete, in Greece, and Near East.
