= Trichodes bicinctus =

Scientific classification
- Kingdom: Animalia
- Phylum: Arthropoda
- Class: Insecta
- Order: Coleoptera
- Suborder: Polyphaga
- Infraorder: Cucujiformia
- Family: Cleridae
- Genus: Trichodes
- Species: T. bicinctus

Binomial name
- Trichodes bicinctus Green, 1917

Species of beetle

Trichodes bicinctus is a species of checkered beetle in the family Cleridae. It is found in North America.
