= Oxycoleus ruficollis =

Scientific classification
- Kingdom: Animalia
- Phylum: Arthropoda
- Class: Insecta
- Order: Coleoptera
- Suborder: Polyphaga
- Infraorder: Cucujiformia
- Family: Cerambycidae
- Genus: Oxycoleus
- Species: O. ruficollis

Binomial name
- Oxycoleus ruficollis (Zajciw, 1964)

Species of beetle

Oxycoleus ruficollis is a species of beetle in the family Cerambycidae. It was described by Dmytro Zajciw in 1964.

It is brown in color, with a short, segmented, thorax.
