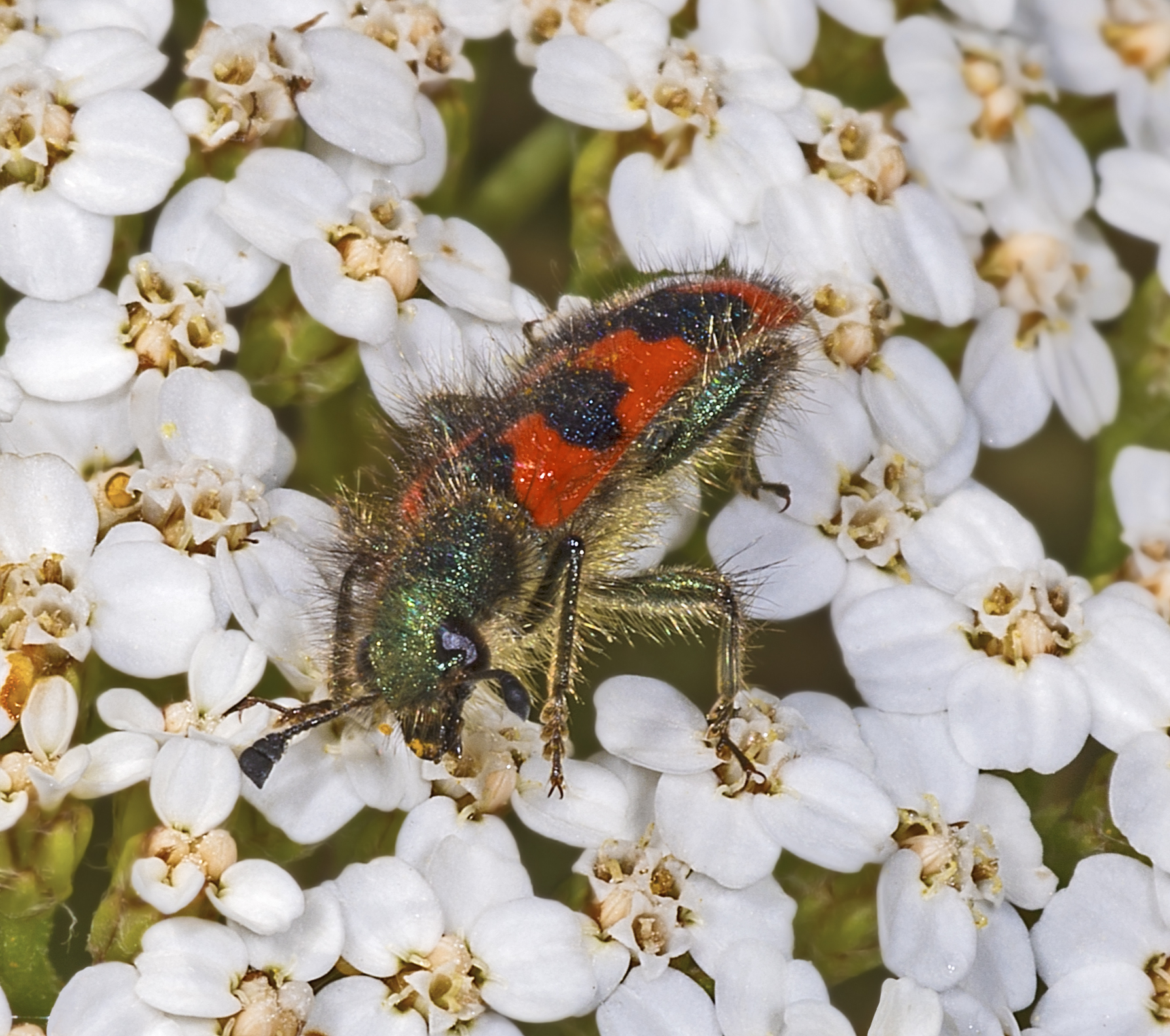
- Trichodes alvearius

Scientific classification
- Kingdom: Animalia
- Phylum: Arthropoda
- Clade: Pancrustacea
- Class: Insecta
- Order: Coleoptera
- Suborder: Polyphaga
- Infraorder: Cucujiformia
- Family: Cleridae
- Subfamily: Clerinae
- Genus: Trichodes; Herbst, 1792

= Trichodes =

Genus of beetles

Trichodes is a genus of checkered beetle belonging to the family Cleridae, subfamily Clerinae.

== Species ==
These 64 species belong to the genus Trichodes:

- Trichodes affinis Chevrolat, 1843
- Trichodes albanicus Winkler & Zirovnicky, 1980^{g}
- Trichodes alberi Escherich, 1894^{g}
- Trichodes alvearius (Fabricius, 1792)^{g}
- Trichodes ammios (Fabricius, 1787)^{g}
- Trichodes apiarius (Linnaeus, 1758)- Bee Beetle
- Trichodes apivorus Germar
- Trichodes aulicus Klug^{g}
- Trichodes axillaris Fischer, 1842
- Trichodes bibalteatus LeConte, 1858^{i c g b}
- Trichodes bicinctus Green, 1917^{i c g b}
- Trichodes bimaculatus LeConte, 1874^{i c g}
- Trichodes calamistratus Corporaal^{g}
- Trichodes crabroniformis (Fabricius, 1787)^{g}
- Trichodes creticus Brodsky, 1982^{g}
- Trichodes cyprius Reitter, 1893^{g}
- Trichodes dilatipennis Reitter, 1894^{g}
- Trichodes ephippiger Chevrolat, 1874^{g}
- Trichodes favarius (Illiger, 1802)^{g}
- Trichodes flavocinctus Spinola, 1844^{g}
- Trichodes ganglbaueri Escherich, 1893^{g}
- Trichodes graecus Winkler & Zirovnicky, 1980^{g}
- Trichodes heydeni Escherich, 1892^{g}
- Trichodes inermis Reitter, 1894^{g}
- Trichodes insignis Fischer von Waldheim, 1829^{g}
- Trichodes ircutensis (Laxmann, 1770)
- Trichodes jelineki Brodsky & Winkler, 1988^{g}
- Trichodes laminatus Chevrolat, 1843^{g}
- Trichodes lepidus Walker^{g}
- Trichodes leucopsideus (Olivier, 1795)^{g}
- Trichodes longicollis Gerstmeier, 1985^{g}
- Trichodes longissimus (Abeille, 1881)^{g}
- Trichodes martini Fairmaire^{g}
- Trichodes nobilis Klug, 1842^{g}
- Trichodes nuttalli (Kirby, 1818)^{i c g b} (red-blue checkered beetle, Nuttal's shaggy beetle)
- Trichodes oberthueri Chanipenois, 1900
- Trichodes octopunctatus (Fabricius, 1787)^{g}
- Trichodes olivieri (Chevrolat, 1843)^{g}
- Trichodes oregonensis Barr, 1952^{i c g}
- Trichodes oresterus Wolcott, 1910^{i c g b}
- Trichodes ornatus Say, 1823^{i c g b} (ornate checkered beetle)
- Trichodes penicillatus Schenkling^{g}
- Trichodes peninsularis Horn, 1894^{i c g b}
- Trichodes persicus Kraatz, 1894^{g}
- Trichodes pseudaulicus Corporaal^{g}
- Trichodes pulcherrimus Escherich, 1892^{g}
- Trichodes punctatus Fischer von Waldheim, 1829^{g}
- Trichodes quadriguttatus Adams, 1817^{g}
- Trichodes rectilinea Reitter, 1894^{g}
- Trichodes reichei Mulsant & Rey, 1863^{g}
- Trichodes sexpustulatus Chevrolat, 1874^{g}
- Trichodes similis Kraatz, 1894^{g}
- Trichodes simulator Horn, 1880^{i c g b}
- Trichodes sipylus (Linnaeus, 1758)^{g}
- Trichodes suspectus Escherich, 1892^{g}
- Trichodes suturalis Seidlitz, 1891^{g}
- Trichodes syriacus Spinola, 1844
- Trichodes talyshensis Zaitzev, 1915^{g}
- Trichodes tugelanus Gorham^{g}
- Trichodes turkestanicus Kraatz, 1882^{g}
- Trichodes umbellatarum (Olivier, 1795)^{g}
- Trichodes winkleri Zirovnicky, 1976^{g}
- Trichodes zaharae Chevrolat, 1861^{g}
- Trichodes zebra Faldermann, 1835^{g}

Data sources: i = ITIS, c = Catalogue of Life, g = GBIF, b = Bugguide.net
