= Trichodes suturalis =

Scientific classification
- Kingdom: Animalia
- Phylum: Arthropoda
- Class: Insecta
- Order: Coleoptera
- Suborder: Polyphaga
- Infraorder: Cucujiformia
- Family: Cleridae
- Genus: Trichodes
- Species: T. suturalis

Binomial name
- Trichodes suturalis Seidlitz, 1891

Species of beetle

Trichodes suturalis is a beetle species of checkered beetles belonging to the family Cleridae, subfamily Clerinae. It was described by Georg Karl Maria Seidlitz in 1891 and is endemic to Spain.
