= Oxycoleus obscurus =

Scientific classification
- Kingdom: Animalia
- Phylum: Arthropoda
- Class: Insecta
- Order: Coleoptera
- Suborder: Polyphaga
- Infraorder: Cucujiformia
- Family: Cerambycidae
- Genus: Oxycoleus
- Species: O. obscurus

Binomial name
- Oxycoleus obscurus Julio, 1997

Species of beetle

Oxycoleus obscurus is a species of beetle in the family Cerambycidae. It was described by Julio in 1997.
