= Oxycoleus carinatipennis =

Scientific classification
- Kingdom: Animalia
- Phylum: Arthropoda
- Class: Insecta
- Order: Coleoptera
- Suborder: Polyphaga
- Infraorder: Cucujiformia
- Family: Cerambycidae
- Genus: Oxycoleus
- Species: O. carinatipennis

Binomial name
- Oxycoleus carinatipennis (Zajciw, 1964)

Species of beetle

Oxycoleus carinatipennis is a species of beetle in the family Cerambycidae. It was described by Zajciw in 1964.
