= Oxycoleus brasiliensis =

Scientific classification
- Kingdom: Animalia
- Phylum: Arthropoda
- Class: Insecta
- Order: Coleoptera
- Suborder: Polyphaga
- Infraorder: Cucujiformia
- Family: Cerambycidae
- Genus: Oxycoleus
- Species: O. brasiliensis

Binomial name
- Oxycoleus brasiliensis (Tippmann, 1953)

Species of beetle

Oxycoleus brasiliensis is a species of beetle in the family Cerambycidae. It was described by Tippmann in 1953.
