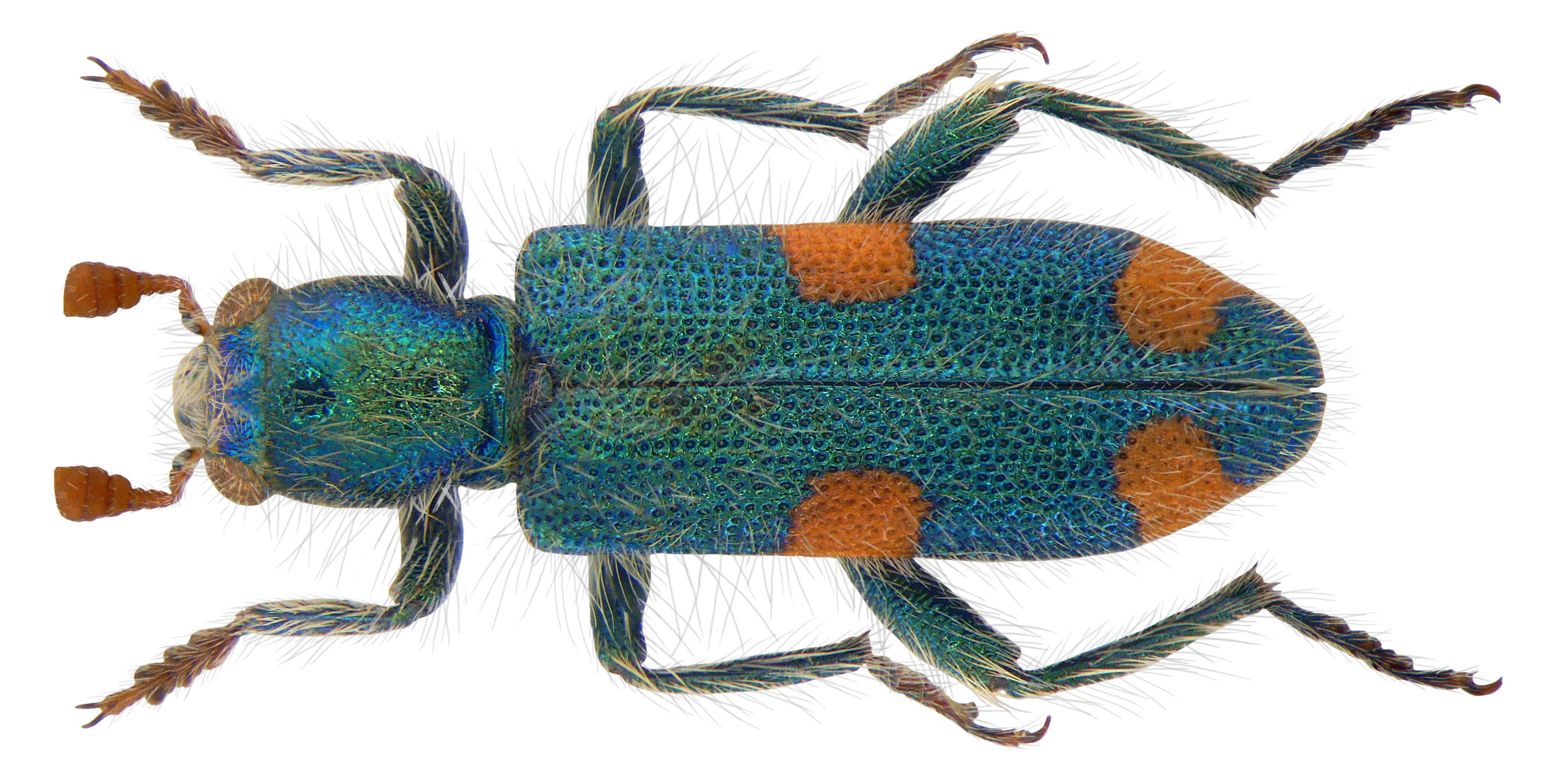

Scientific classification
- Domain: Eukaryota
- Kingdom: Animalia
- Phylum: Arthropoda
- Class: Insecta
- Order: Coleoptera
- Suborder: Polyphaga
- Infraorder: Cucujiformia
- Family: Cleridae
- Genus: Trichodes
- Species: T. quadriguttatus

Binomial name
- Trichodes quadriguttatus Adams, 1817

Synonyms
- Trichodes quadriguttatus Spinola, 1844; Clerus quadripustulatus Brullé, 1832

= Trichodes quadriguttatus =

Species of beetle

Trichodes quadriguttatus is a beetle species of checkered beetles belonging to the family Cleridae, subfamily Clerinae. It can be found in Bulgaria, Greece, Kosovo, Montenegro, Serbia, Voivodina, and Near East.
