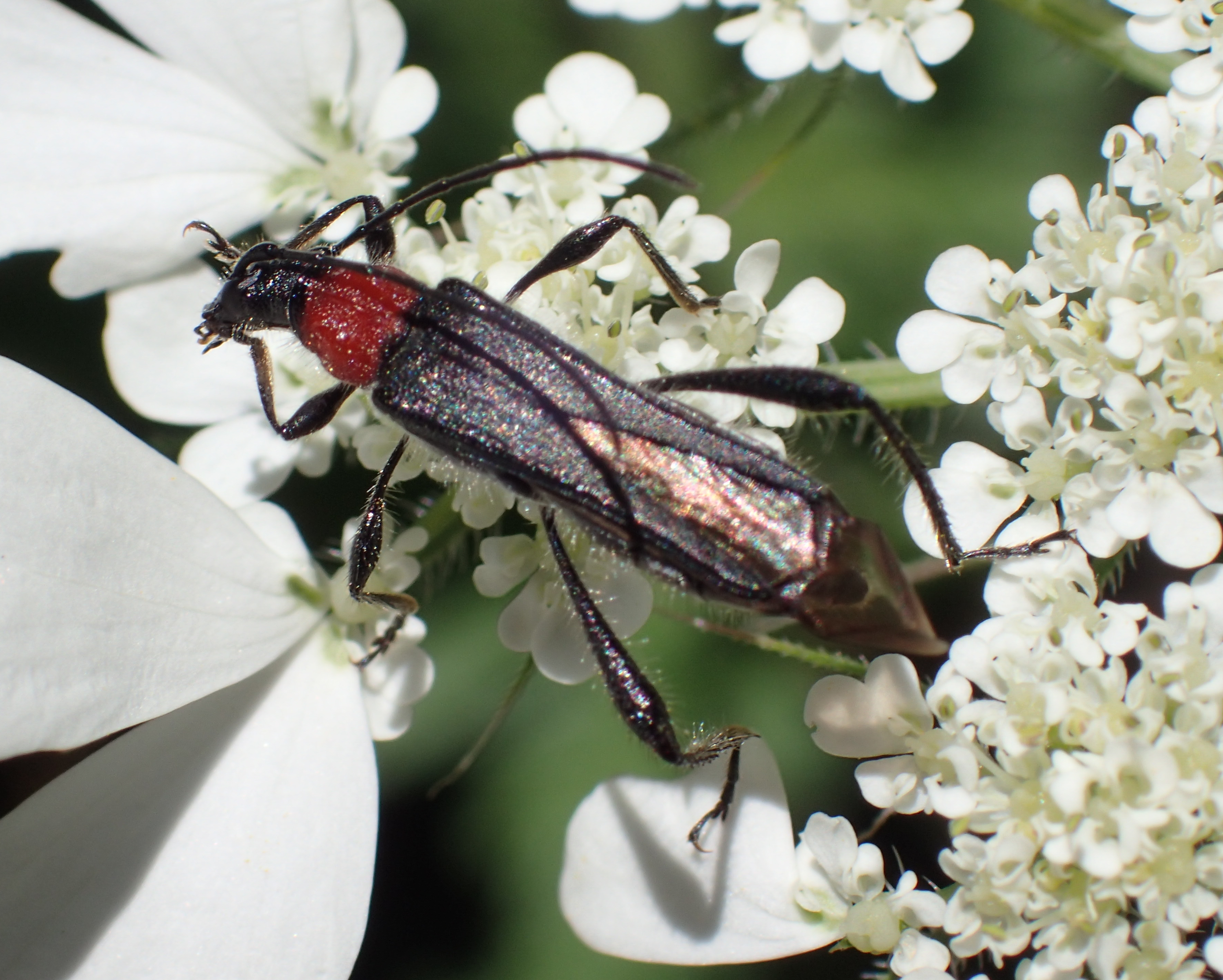
- Callimoxys gracilis

Scientific classification
- Domain: Eukaryota
- Kingdom: Animalia
- Phylum: Arthropoda
- Class: Insecta
- Order: Coleoptera
- Suborder: Polyphaga
- Infraorder: Cucujiformia
- Family: Cerambycidae
- Subfamily: Cerambycinae
- Tribe: Stenopterini
- Genus: Callimoxys; Kraatz, 1863

= Callimoxys =

Genus of beetles

Callimoxys is a genus of long-horned beetles in the family Cerambycidae. There are about eight described species in Callimoxys.

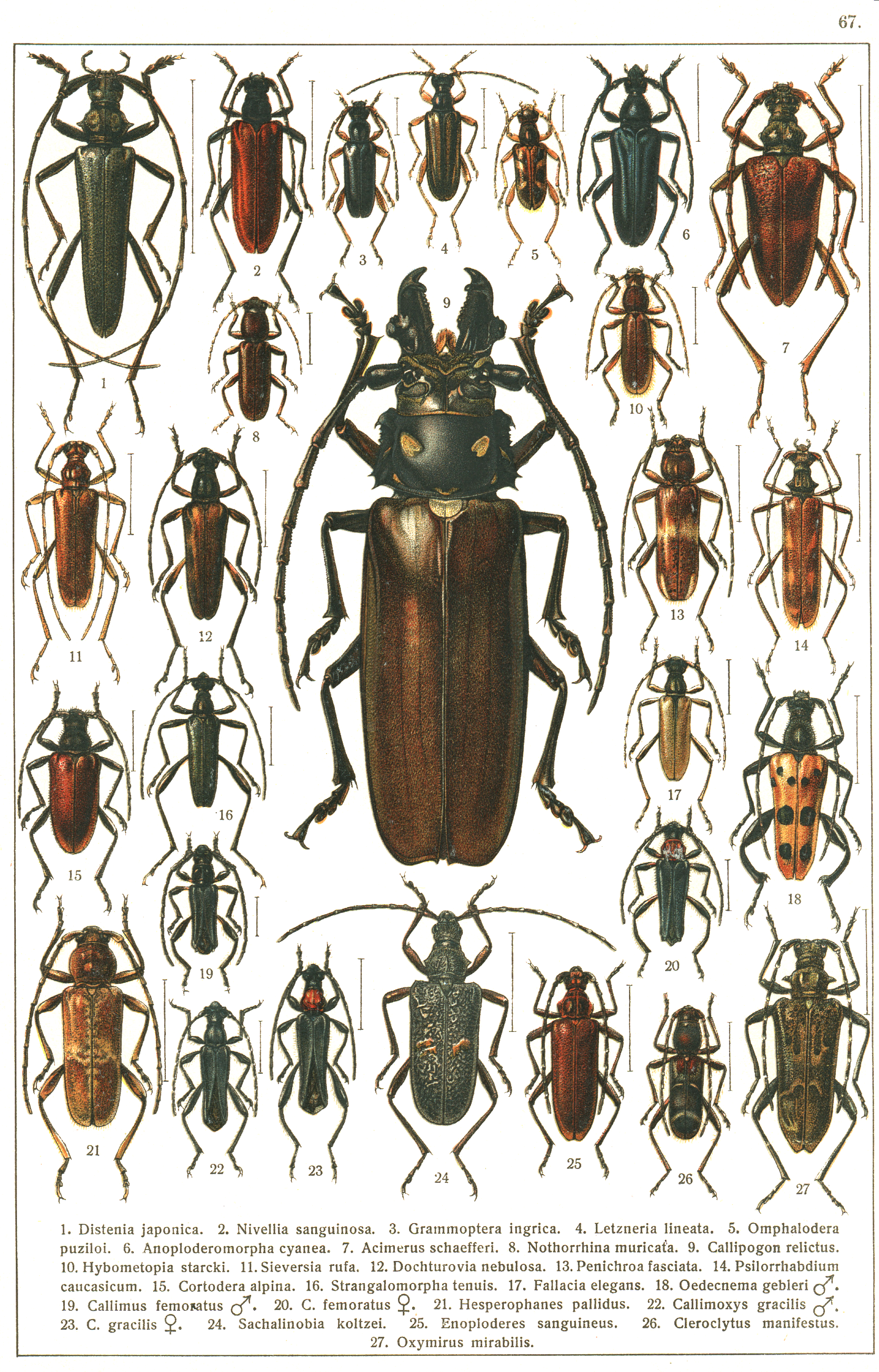
Callimoxys gracilis

== Species ==
These eight species belong to the genus Callimoxys:

- Callimoxys fuscipennis LeConte, 1861
- Callimoxys gracilis (Brullé, 1832)
- Callimoxys nigrinus Hammond & Williams, 2011
- Callimoxys ocularis Hammond & Williams, 2011
- Callimoxys pinorum Casey, 1924
- Callimoxys retusifer Holzschuh, 1999
- Callimoxys sanguinicollis (Olivier, 1795) (blood-necked longhorn)
- † Callimoxys primordialis Wickham, 1911
