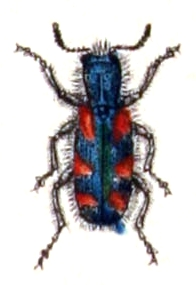

Scientific classification
- Domain: Eukaryota
- Kingdom: Animalia
- Phylum: Arthropoda
- Class: Insecta
- Order: Coleoptera
- Suborder: Polyphaga
- Infraorder: Cucujiformia
- Family: Cleridae
- Genus: Trichodes
- Species: T. favarius

Binomial name
- Trichodes favarius Illiger, 1802

Synonyms
- Clerus favarius Illiger, 1802; Clerus insignis Ronchetti, 1910; Trichodes elegantulus Spinola, 1844; Trichodes hispanicus Spinola, 1844

= Trichodes favarius =

Species of beetle

Trichodes favarius is a beetle species of checkered beetles belonging to the family Cleridae, subfamily Clerinae. It can be found in Austria, Croatia, Greece, Hungary, and Italy.
