= Trichodes zaharae =

Scientific classification
- Kingdom: Animalia
- Phylum: Arthropoda
- Class: Insecta
- Order: Coleoptera
- Suborder: Polyphaga
- Infraorder: Cucujiformia
- Family: Cleridae
- Genus: Trichodes
- Species: T. zaharae

Binomial name
- Trichodes zaharae Chevrolat, 1861

Species of beetle

Trichodes zaharae is a beetle species of checkered beetles belonging to the family Cleridae, subfamily Clerinae. It was described by Louis Alexandre Auguste Chevrolat in 1861 and is endemic to Spain.
