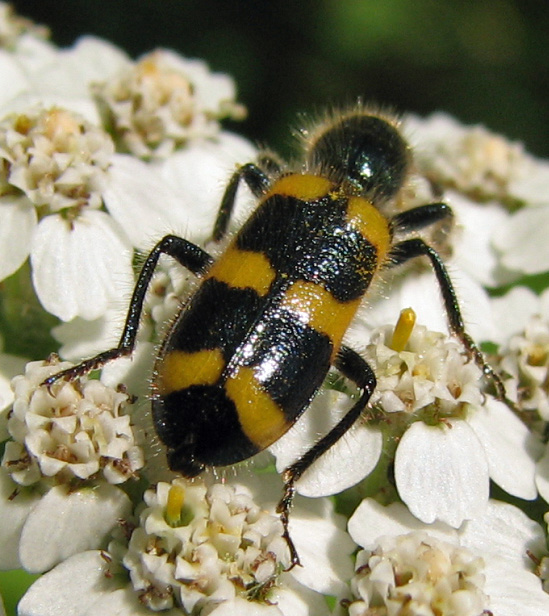

Scientific classification
- Kingdom: Animalia
- Phylum: Arthropoda
- Class: Insecta
- Order: Coleoptera
- Suborder: Polyphaga
- Infraorder: Cucujiformia
- Family: Cleridae
- Genus: Trichodes
- Species: T. nuttalli

Binomial name
- Trichodes nuttalli (Kirby, 1818)

= Trichodes nuttalli =

Species of beetle

Trichodes nuttalli, known generally as the red-blue checkered beetle or Nuttall's shaggy beetle, is a species of checkered beetle in the family Cleridae. It is found in North America.
