= Oxycoleus flavipes =

Scientific classification
- Kingdom: Animalia
- Phylum: Arthropoda
- Class: Insecta
- Order: Coleoptera
- Suborder: Polyphaga
- Infraorder: Cucujiformia
- Family: Cerambycidae
- Genus: Oxycoleus
- Species: O. flavipes

Binomial name
- Oxycoleus flavipes Martins & Galileo, 2006

Species of beetle

Oxycoleus flavipes is a species of beetle in the family Cerambycidae. It was described by Martins and Galileo in 2006.
