= Oxycoleus clavipes =

Scientific classification
- Kingdom: Animalia
- Phylum: Arthropoda
- Class: Insecta
- Order: Coleoptera
- Suborder: Polyphaga
- Infraorder: Cucujiformia
- Family: Cerambycidae
- Genus: Oxycoleus
- Species: O. clavipes

Binomial name
- Oxycoleus clavipes Lacordaire, 1869

Species of beetle

Oxycoleus clavipes is a species of beetle in the family Cerambycidae. It was described by Lacordaire in 1869.
