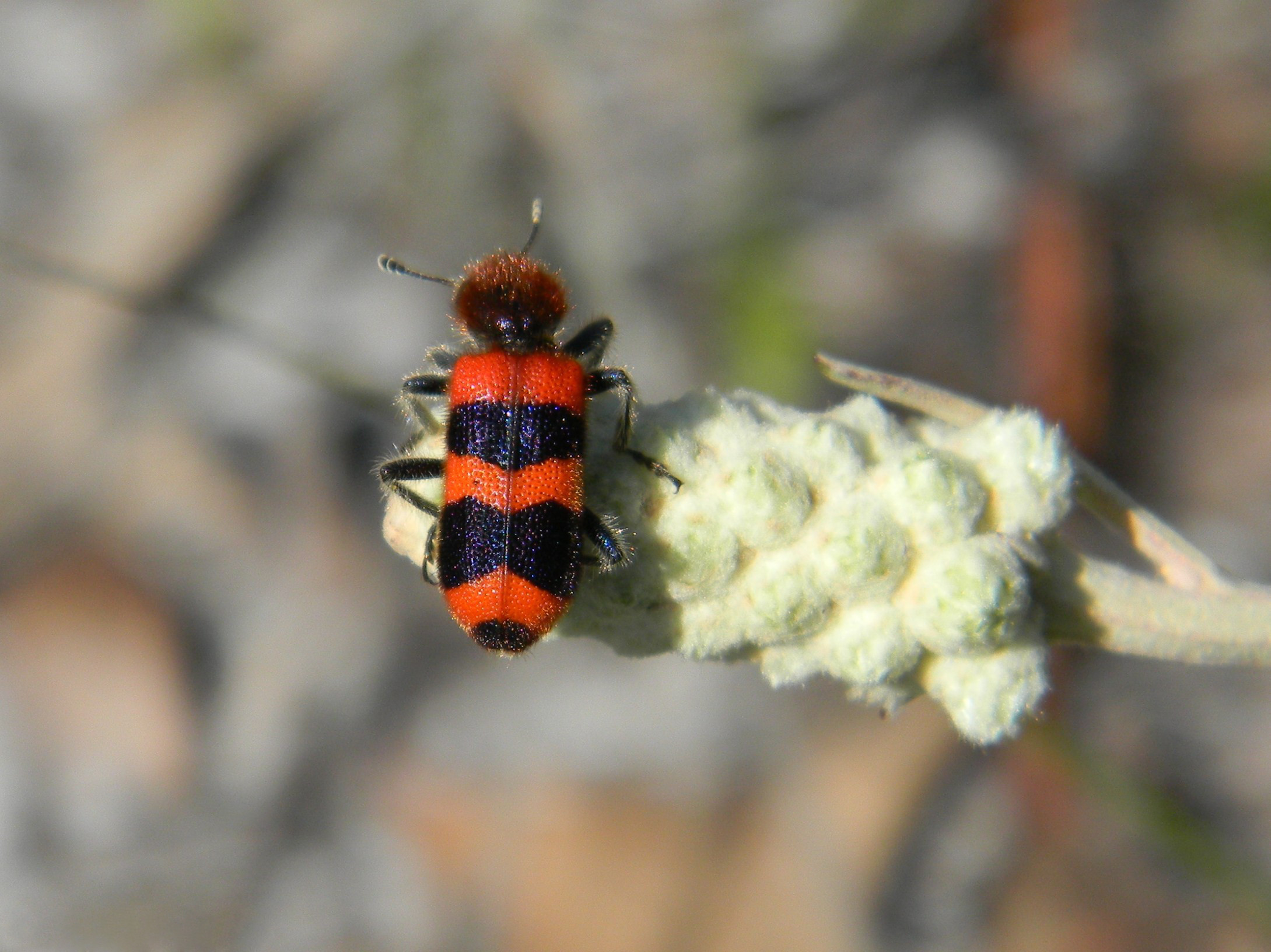

Scientific classification
- Kingdom: Animalia
- Phylum: Arthropoda
- Class: Insecta
- Order: Coleoptera
- Suborder: Polyphaga
- Infraorder: Cucujiformia
- Family: Cleridae
- Genus: Trichodes
- Species: T. apivorus

Binomial name
- Trichodes apivorus Germar, 1824

= Trichodes apivorus =

Species of beetle

Trichodes apivorus is a species of checkered beetle in the family Cleridae. It is found in Central America and North America.

== Subspecies ==
These two subspecies belong to the species Trichodes apivorus:

- Trichodes apivorus apivorus
- Trichodes apivorus borealis Wolcott & E.A.Chapin, 1918
