= Oxycoleus laetus =

Scientific classification
- Kingdom: Animalia
- Phylum: Arthropoda
- Class: Insecta
- Order: Coleoptera
- Suborder: Polyphaga
- Infraorder: Cucujiformia
- Family: Cerambycidae
- Genus: Oxycoleus
- Species: O. laetus

Binomial name
- Oxycoleus laetus Julio, 1997

Species of beetle

Oxycoleus laetus is a species of beetle in the family Cerambycidae. It was described by Julio in 1997.
