= Trichodes creticus =

Scientific classification
- Domain: Eukaryota
- Kingdom: Animalia
- Phylum: Arthropoda
- Class: Insecta
- Order: Coleoptera
- Suborder: Polyphaga
- Infraorder: Cucujiformia
- Family: Cleridae
- Genus: Trichodes
- Species: T. creticus

Binomial name
- Trichodes creticus Brodsky, 1982

Species of beetle

Trichodes creticus is a beetle species of checkered beetles belonging to the family Cleridae, subfamily Clerinae. It can is endemic to Crete.
