= Trichodes oresterus =

Scientific classification
- Kingdom: Animalia
- Phylum: Arthropoda
- Class: Insecta
- Order: Coleoptera
- Suborder: Polyphaga
- Infraorder: Cucujiformia
- Family: Cleridae
- Genus: Trichodes
- Species: T. oresterus

Binomial name
- Trichodes oresterus Wolcott, 1910

Species of beetle

Trichodes oresterus is a species of checkered beetle in the family Cleridae. It is found in North America.
