= Trichodes ammios =

Scientific classification
- Kingdom: Animalia
- Phylum: Arthropoda
- Clade: Pancrustacea
- Class: Insecta
- Order: Coleoptera
- Suborder: Polyphaga
- Infraorder: Cucujiformia
- Family: Cleridae
- Genus: Trichodes
- Species: T. laminatus

Binomial name
- Trichodes laminatus (Fabricius, 1787)

Synonyms
- Clerus ammios Fabricius, 1787; Trichodes flavicornis Germar, 1838; Clerus sipylus Fabricius, 1775; Trichodes arthriticus Spinola, 1844; Trichodes omoplatus Spinola, 1844; Trichodes subfasciatus Spinola, 1844

Species of beetle

Trichodes laminatus is a beetle species of checkered beetles belonging to the family Cleridae, subfamily Clerinae. It can be found in Italy, Sicily, Spain, and North Africa.
