= Trichodes similis =

Scientific classification
- Domain: Eukaryota
- Kingdom: Animalia
- Phylum: Arthropoda
- Class: Insecta
- Order: Coleoptera
- Suborder: Polyphaga
- Infraorder: Cucujiformia
- Family: Cleridae
- Genus: Trichodes
- Species: T. similis

Binomial name
- Trichodes similis Kraatz, 1894

Species of beetle

Trichodes similis is a beetle species of checkered beetles belonging to the family Cleridae, subfamily Clerinae. It was described by Ernst Gustav Kraatz in 1894 and is endemic to Greece.
