= Trichodes longissimus =

Scientific classification
- Domain: Eukaryota
- Kingdom: Animalia
- Phylum: Arthropoda
- Class: Insecta
- Order: Coleoptera
- Suborder: Polyphaga
- Infraorder: Cucujiformia
- Family: Cleridae
- Genus: Trichodes
- Species: T. longissimus

Binomial name
- Trichodes longissimus (Abeille, 1881)

Synonyms
- Clerus longissimus Abeille, 1881; Clerus angustifrons Abeille, 1881; Trichodes interruptus Kraatz, 1894

Species of beetle

Trichodes longissimus is a beetle species of checkered beetles belonging to the family Cleridae, subfamily Clerinae. It was described by Abeille in 1881 and is endemic to Cyprus.
