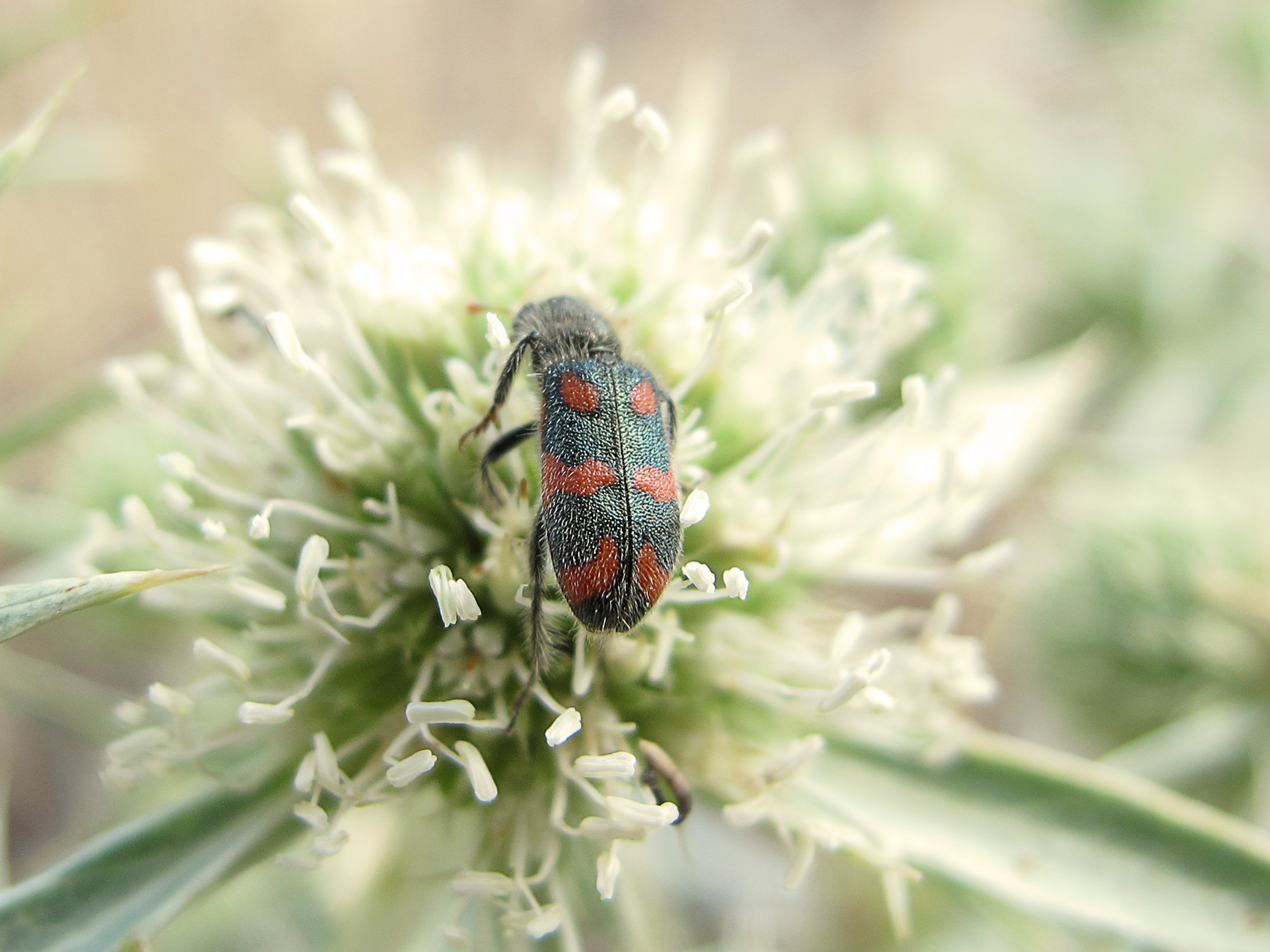

Scientific classification
- Domain: Eukaryota
- Kingdom: Animalia
- Phylum: Arthropoda
- Class: Insecta
- Order: Coleoptera
- Suborder: Polyphaga
- Infraorder: Cucujiformia
- Family: Cleridae
- Genus: Trichodes
- Species: T. flavocinctus

Binomial name
- Trichodes flavocinctus Spinola, 1844

Synonyms
- Trichodes flavicornis Chevrolat, 1874; Trichodes podagricus Chevrolat, 1876; Trichodes hispanus Chevrolat, 1876

= Trichodes flavocinctus =

Species of beetle

Trichodes flavocinctus is a beetle species of checkered beetles belonging to the family Cleridae, subfamily Clerinae. It was described by Maximilian Spinola in 1844 and can be found in France, Spain, Portugal, the island of Corsica, and North Africa.
