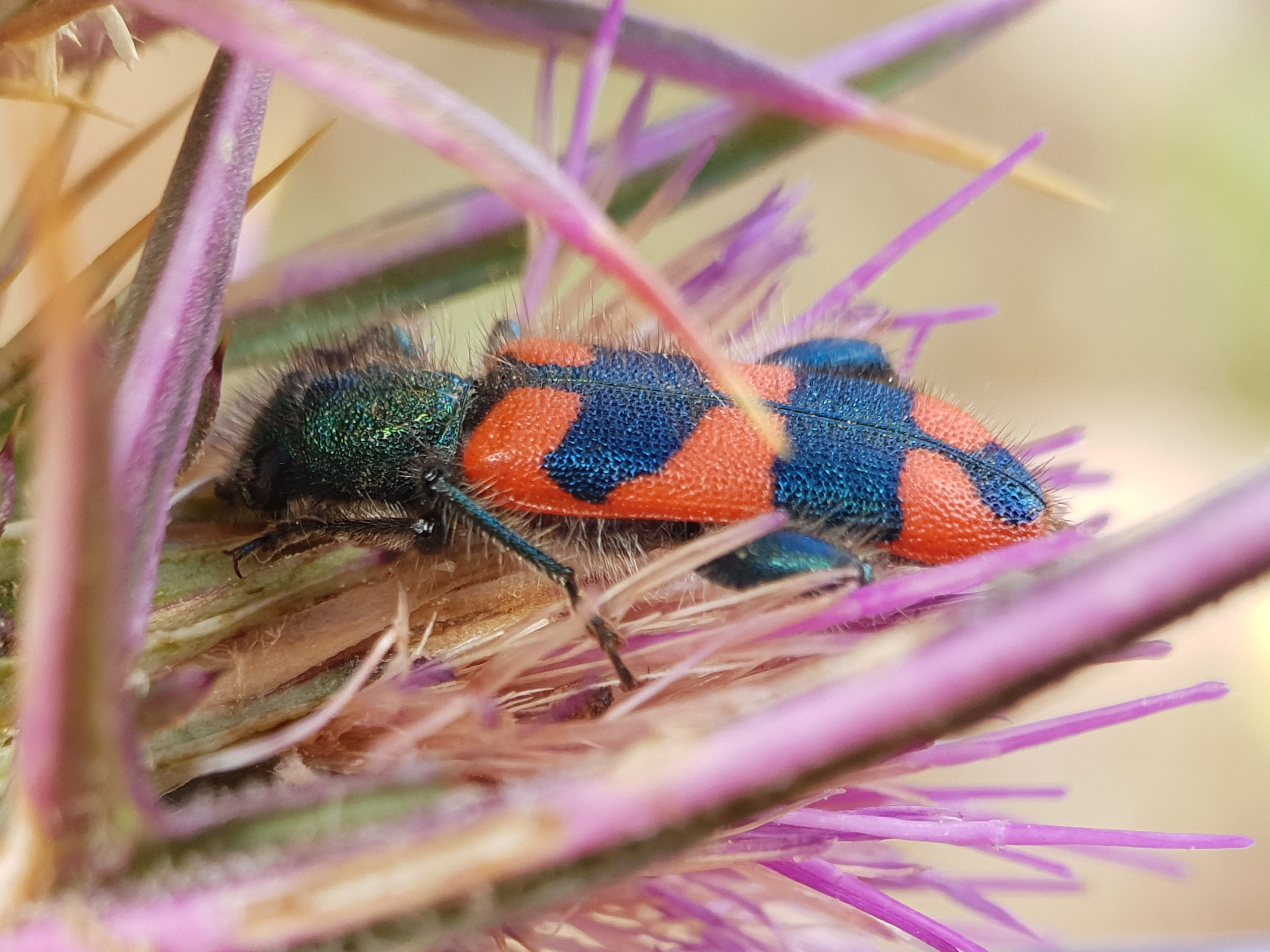
- Trichodes affinis in Israel

Scientific classification
- Domain: Eukaryota
- Kingdom: Animalia
- Phylum: Arthropoda
- Class: Insecta
- Order: Coleoptera
- Suborder: Polyphaga
- Infraorder: Cucujiformia
- Family: Cleridae
- Genus: Trichodes
- Species: T. affinis

Binomial name
- Trichodes affinis Chevrolat, 1843

Synonyms
- Trichodes antiquus Klug, 1842; Trichodes illepidus Walker, 1871

= Trichodes affinis =

Species of beetle

Trichodes affinis is a beetle species of checkered beetles belonging to the family Cleridae, subfamily Clerinae. It can be found in European part of Turkey, Greece, and Near East.
