= Trichodes winkleri =

Scientific classification
- Domain: Eukaryota
- Kingdom: Animalia
- Phylum: Arthropoda
- Class: Insecta
- Order: Coleoptera
- Suborder: Polyphaga
- Infraorder: Cucujiformia
- Family: Cleridae
- Genus: Trichodes
- Species: T. winkleri

Binomial name
- Trichodes winkleri Zirovnicky, 1976

Species of beetle

Trichodes winkleri is a beetle species of checkered beetles belonging to the family Cleridae, subfamily Clerinae. It was described by Zirovnicky in 1976 and is endemic to Greece.
