= Trichodes umbellatarum =

Scientific classification
- Kingdom: Animalia
- Phylum: Arthropoda
- Clade: Pancrustacea
- Class: Insecta
- Order: Coleoptera
- Suborder: Polyphaga
- Infraorder: Cucujiformia
- Family: Cleridae
- Genus: Trichodes
- Species: T. umbellatarum

Binomial name
- Trichodes umbellatarum (Olivier, 1795)

Synonyms
- Clerus umbellatarum Olivier, 1795; Trichodes gafsanus Bodemeyer, 1929; Clerus umbellatarum Olivier, 1795; Trichodes umbellatarum Spinola, 1844; Trichodes aindrahamensis Bodemeyer, 1929; Trichodes umbellatarius Schonherr, 1806

Species of beetle

Trichodes umbellatarum is a beetle species of checkered beetles belonging to the family Cleridae, subfamily Clerinae. It can be found in France, Portugal, Spain, Balearic Islands, and North Africa.
