= Callimoxys pinorum =

Scientific classification
- Kingdom: Animalia
- Phylum: Arthropoda
- Class: Insecta
- Order: Coleoptera
- Suborder: Polyphaga
- Infraorder: Cucujiformia
- Family: Cerambycidae
- Genus: Callimoxys
- Species: C. pinorum

Binomial name
- Callimoxys pinorum Casey, 1924

Species of beetle

Callimoxys pinorum is a species of beetle in the family Cerambycidae. It was described by Casey in 1924.
