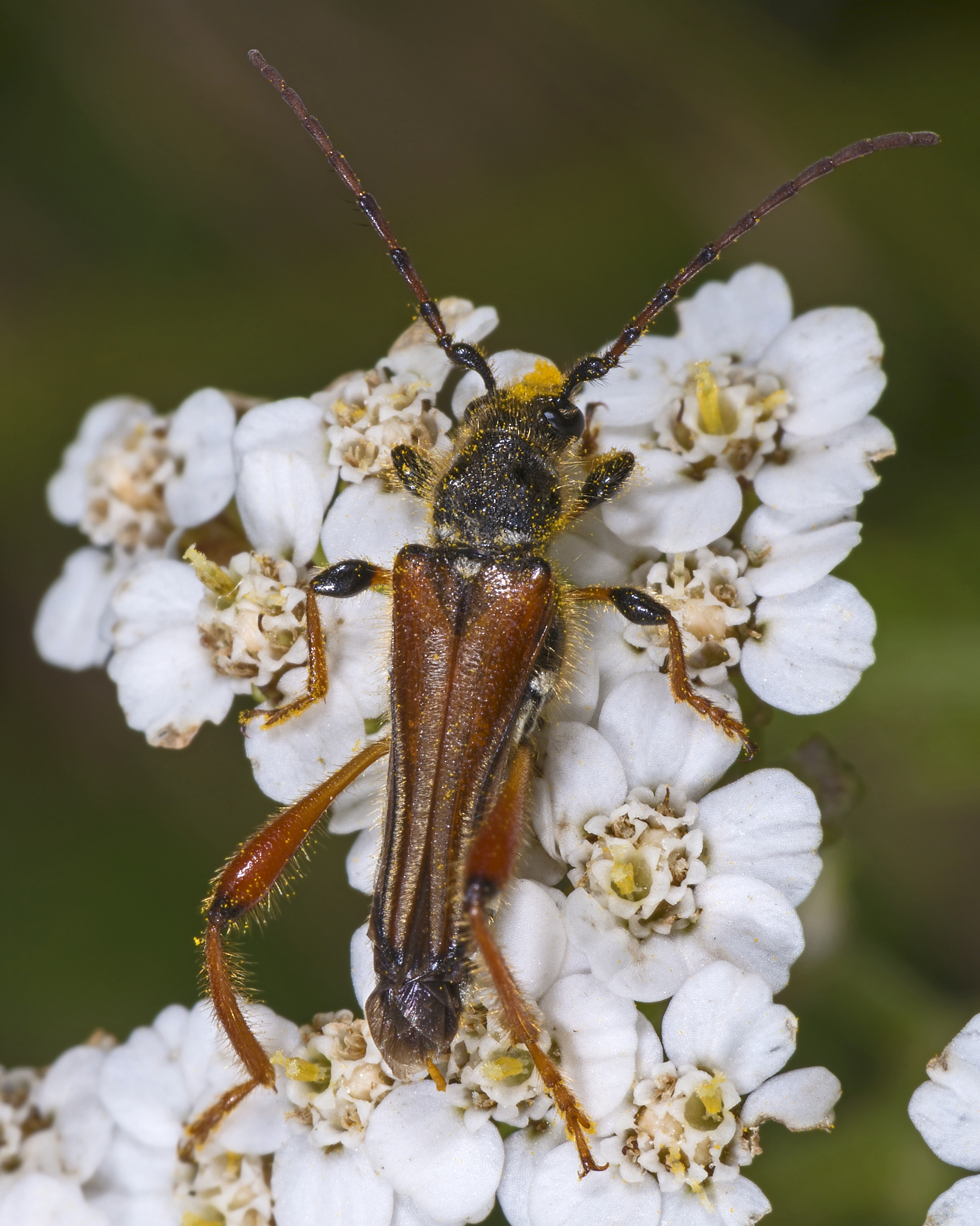

Scientific classification
- Kingdom: Animalia
- Phylum: Arthropoda
- Clade: Pancrustacea
- Class: Insecta
- Order: Coleoptera
- Suborder: Polyphaga
- Infraorder: Cucujiformia
- Family: Cerambycidae
- Genus: Stenopterus
- Species: S. rufus

Binomial name
- Stenopterus rufus (Linnaeus, 1767)

= Stenopterus rufus =

Species of beetle

Stenopterus rufus is a beetle species of round-necked longhorns belonging to the family Cerambycidae, subfamily Cerambycinae.

== Subspecies and varietas ==
Subspecies and varietas include:

- Stenopterus rufus rufus (Linnaeus, 1767)

Stenopterus rufus rufus var. caubeti Podaný, 1957
Stenopterus rufus rufus var. cavalairensis Jurecek
Stenopterus rufus rufus var. geniculatus Kraatz, 1863
Stenopterus rufus rufus var. meridionalis Ragusa
Stenopterus rufus rufus var. nigricornis Depoli, 1926
Stenopterus rufus rufus var. nigrolineatus Plavilstshikov

- Stenopterus rufus syriacus Pic, 1903
- Stenopterus rufus transcaspicus Plavilstshikov, 1940

== Description ==
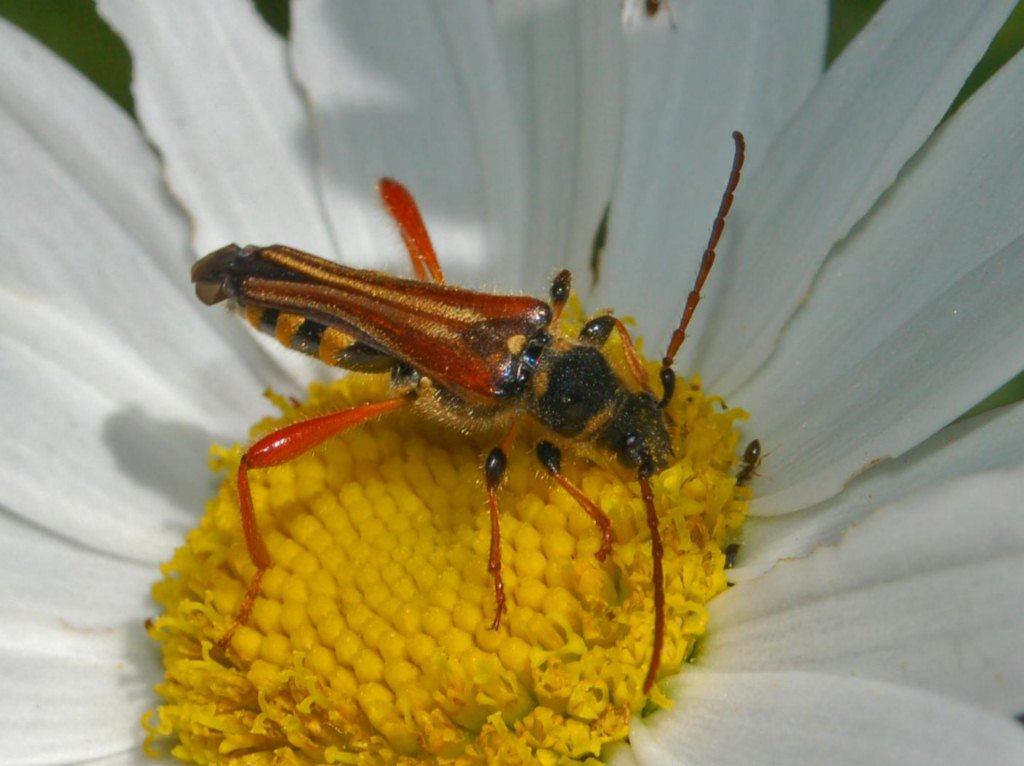
Feeding on pollen

Stenopterus rufus can reach a length of 7–16 millimetres (0.28–0.63 in). The body has a velvet-like hair. Elytra are very narrow. Antennae are about as long as the body and clearly segmented. The head and pronotum are black colored and the abdomen has a black background color horizontally crossed by yellow stripes. The first two segments of their antennae are black, the color of the following ones is variable but generally yellow with items III to V black at the apex, but sometimes items III to XI are entirely yellow or entirely black. Elytra are red with black base and apex. The legs are mainly red.

== Biology ==
Larvae are polyphagous wood borers in dead branches of deciduous trees (Quercus, Castanea, Robinia, Juglans, Prunus, Salix, Pistacia, Corylus avellana, Ostrya carpinifolia, Paliurus spina-christi etc.).

The adults can be encountered from May through August, completing their life cycle in two years. They are very common flower-visitors, especially Apiaceae species, Heracleum sphondylium and Ranunculus repens, feeding on pollen and the nectar.

== Distribution ==
This beetle is widespread in most of Europe, in Caucasus, Transcaucasia, Iran and in the Near East (Albania, Armenia, Austria, Belgium, Bosnia and Herzegovina, Bulgaria, Corsica, Croatia, Czech Republic, France, Germany, Greece, Hungary, Iran, Israel, Italy, Jordan, Luxembourg, Malta, Moldova, Poland, Romania, Russia, Sardinia, Serbia, Sicily, Slovakia, Slovenia, Spain, Switzerland, Syria, Turkey, Turkmenistan, Ukraine).

== Habitat ==
These beetles mainly inhabit meadows, hedge rows, beech forests and wet forests.

== Gallery ==
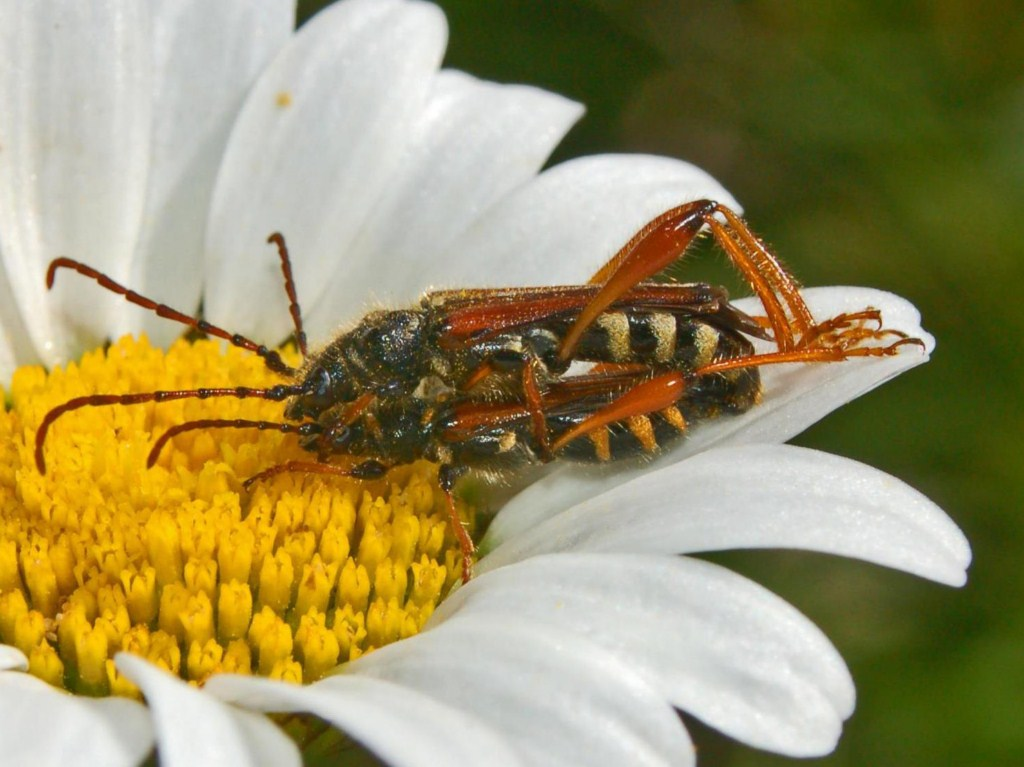
Mating pair

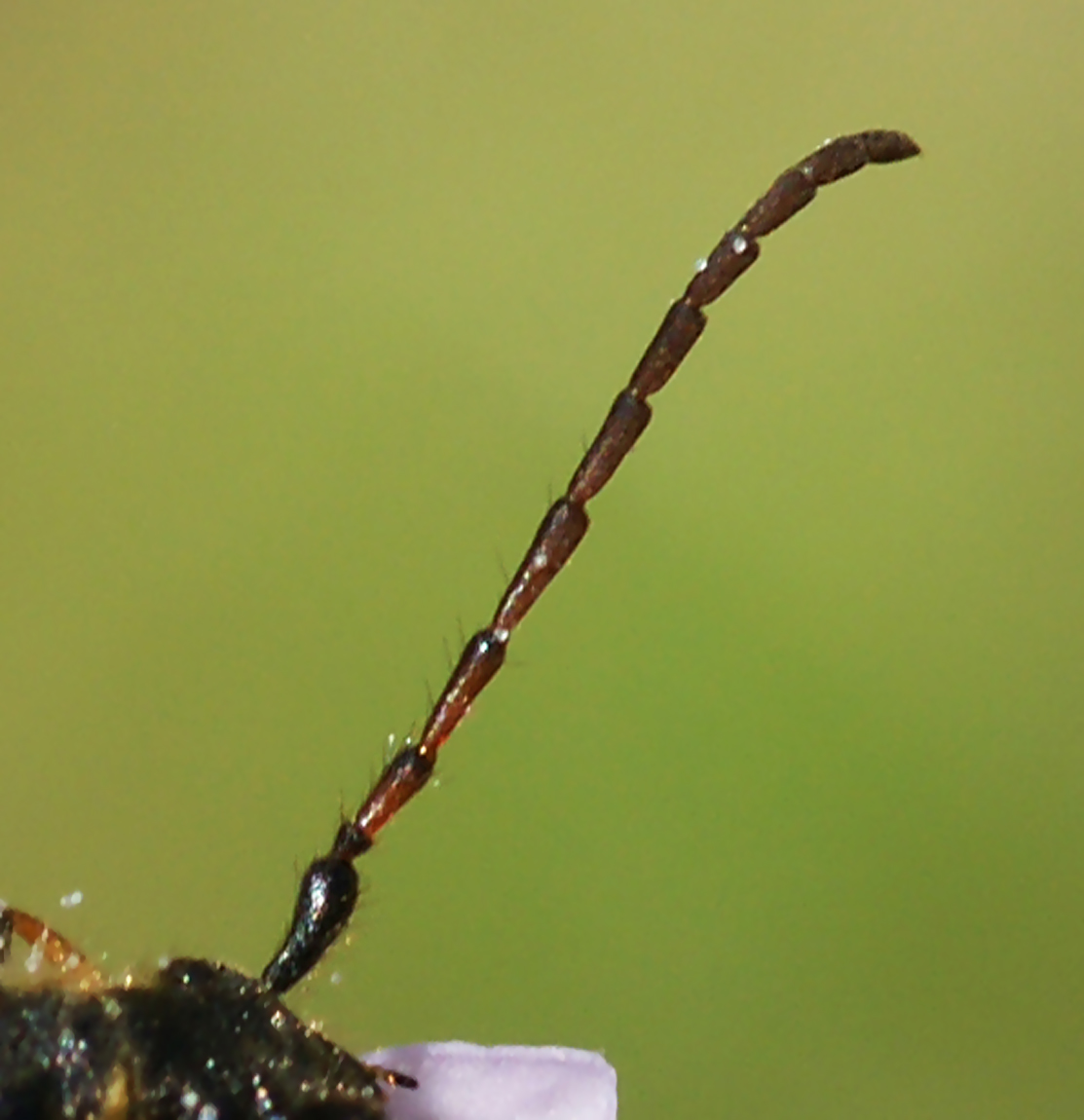
Close-up of antenna

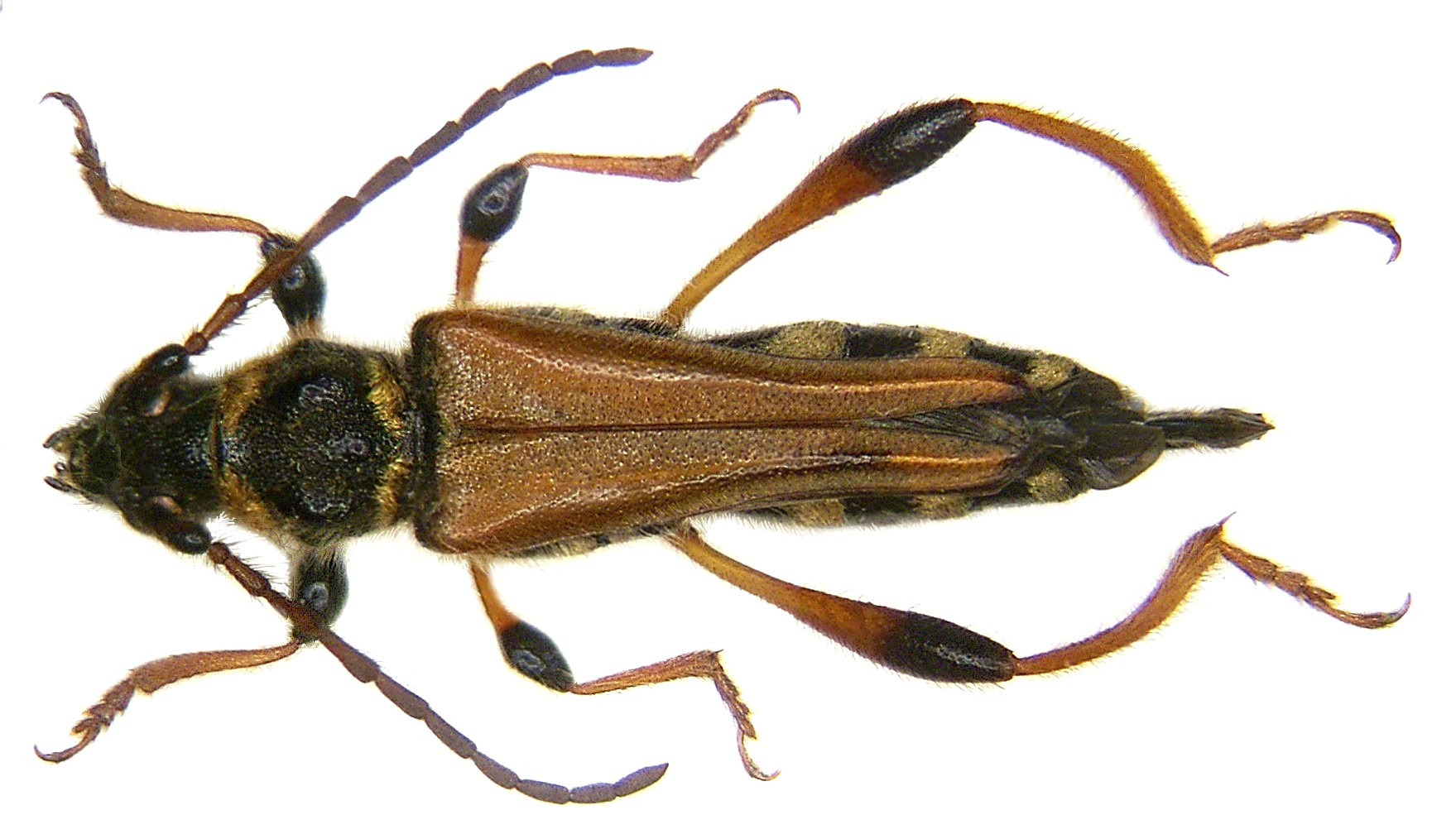
Mounted specimen

Clip
