= Oxylopsebus =

Scientific classification
- Kingdom: Animalia
- Phylum: Arthropoda
- Clade: Pancrustacea
- Class: Insecta
- Order: Coleoptera
- Suborder: Polyphaga
- Infraorder: Cucujiformia
- Family: Cerambycidae
- Subfamily: Cerambycinae
- Genus: Oxylopsebus; Clarke, 2008
- Species: O. brachypterus

Binomial name
- Oxylopsebus brachypterus Clarke, 2008

Genus of beetles

Oxylopsebus is a genus of beetle in the family Cerambycidae, it contains a single species, Oxylopsebus brachypterus. It was described by Clarke in 2008.
