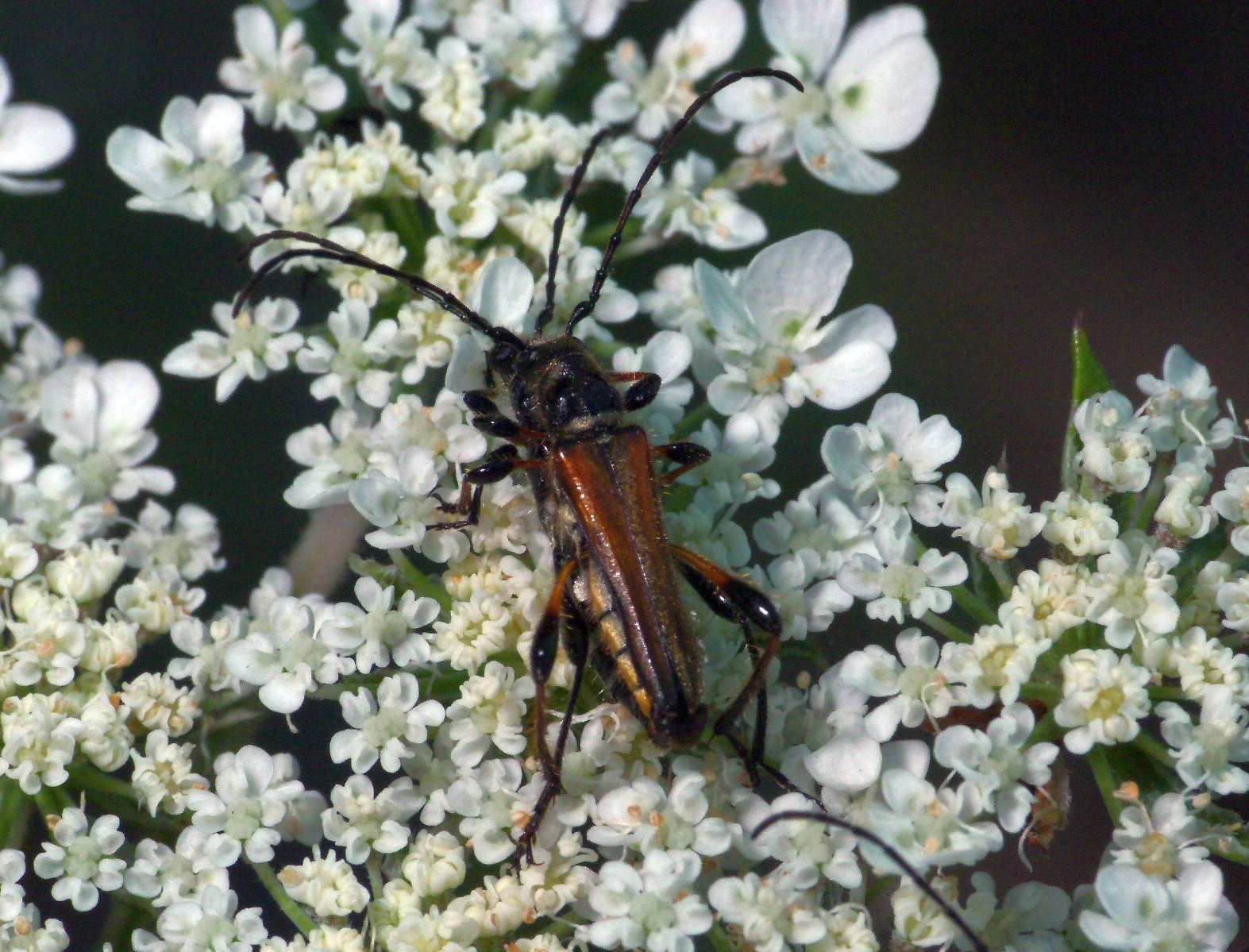
- A mating pair from Esino Lario, Italy

Scientific classification
- Kingdom: Animalia
- Phylum: Arthropoda
- Class: Insecta
- Order: Coleoptera
- Suborder: Polyphaga
- Infraorder: Cucujiformia
- Family: Cerambycidae
- Genus: Stenopterus
- Species: S. ater

Binomial name
- Stenopterus ater (Linnaeus, 1767)

= Stenopterus ater =

Species of beetle

Stenopterus ater is a species of longhorn beetle found across the Western Mediterranean region from North Africa to France and Italy. The larvae grow in dead wood and the adults visit Umbelliferae flowers in summer. They are about 6 to 14 mm long with males and females being differently coloured. The elytra are all black in females and yellowish brown in males. A case of gynandromorphism has been recorded in the species.
