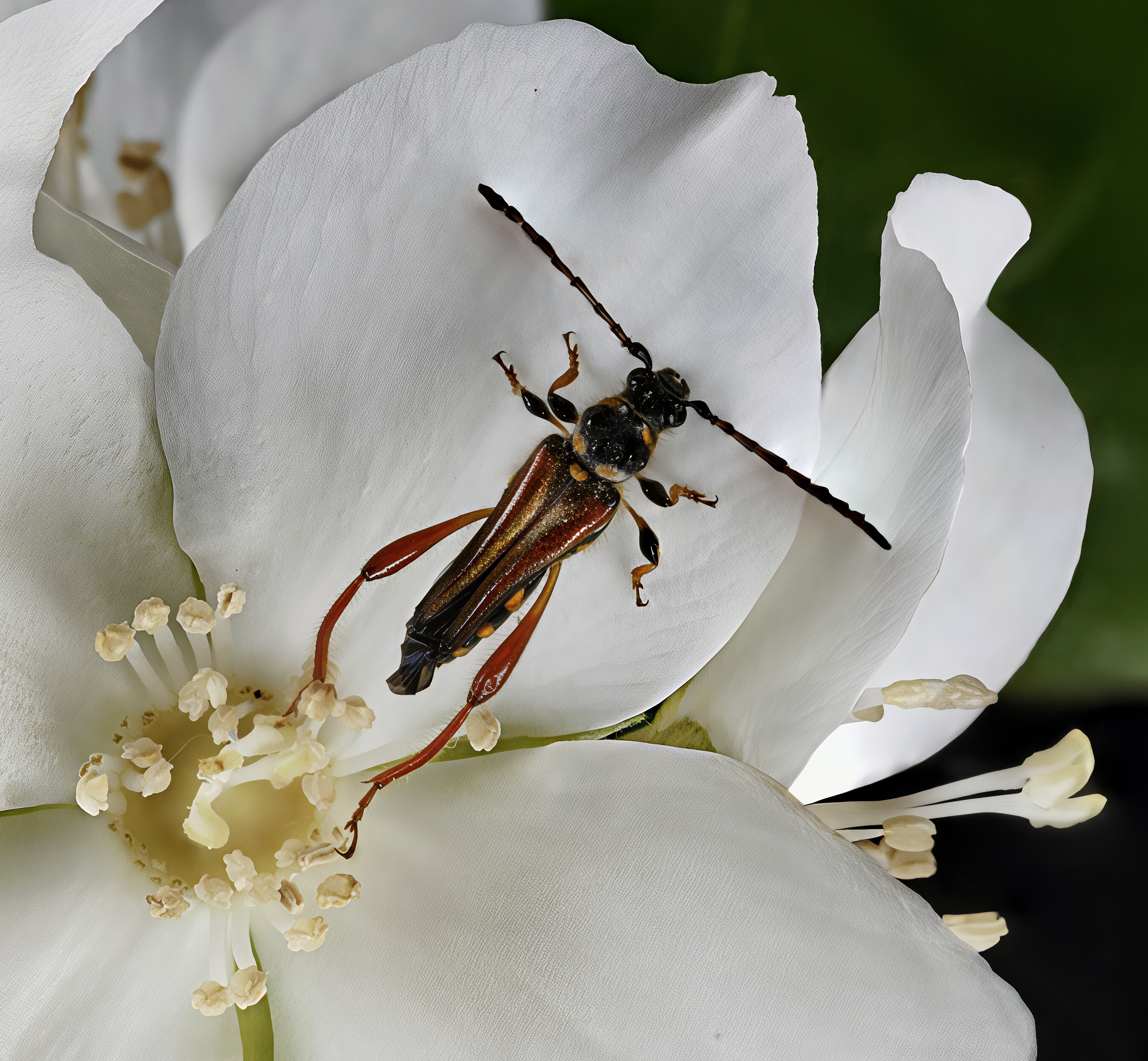
- Stenopterus rufus

Scientific classification
- Domain: Eukaryota
- Kingdom: Animalia
- Phylum: Arthropoda
- Class: Insecta
- Order: Coleoptera
- Suborder: Polyphaga
- Infraorder: Cucujiformia
- Family: Cerambycidae
- Tribe: Stenopterini
- Genus: Stenopterus; Illiger, 1806

= Stenopterus =

Genus of beetles

Stenopterus is a genus of beetles belonging to the family Cerambycidae, subfamily Cerambycinae. Species of this genus are present in most of Europe, in the Near East and in North Africa.

== Selected species ==
- Stenopterus adlbaueri Sama, 1995
- Stenopterus ater (Linnaeus, 1767)
- Stenopterus atricornis Pic, 1891
- Stenopterus creticus Sama, 1995
- Stenopterus flavicornis Küster, 1846
- Stenopterus mauritanicus Lucas, 1846
- Stenopterus rufus (Linnaeus, 1767)
- Stenopterus similatus Holzschuh, 1979
  - Stenopterus similatus mehli Sama, 1995
  - Stenopterus similatus similatus Holzschuh, 1979
