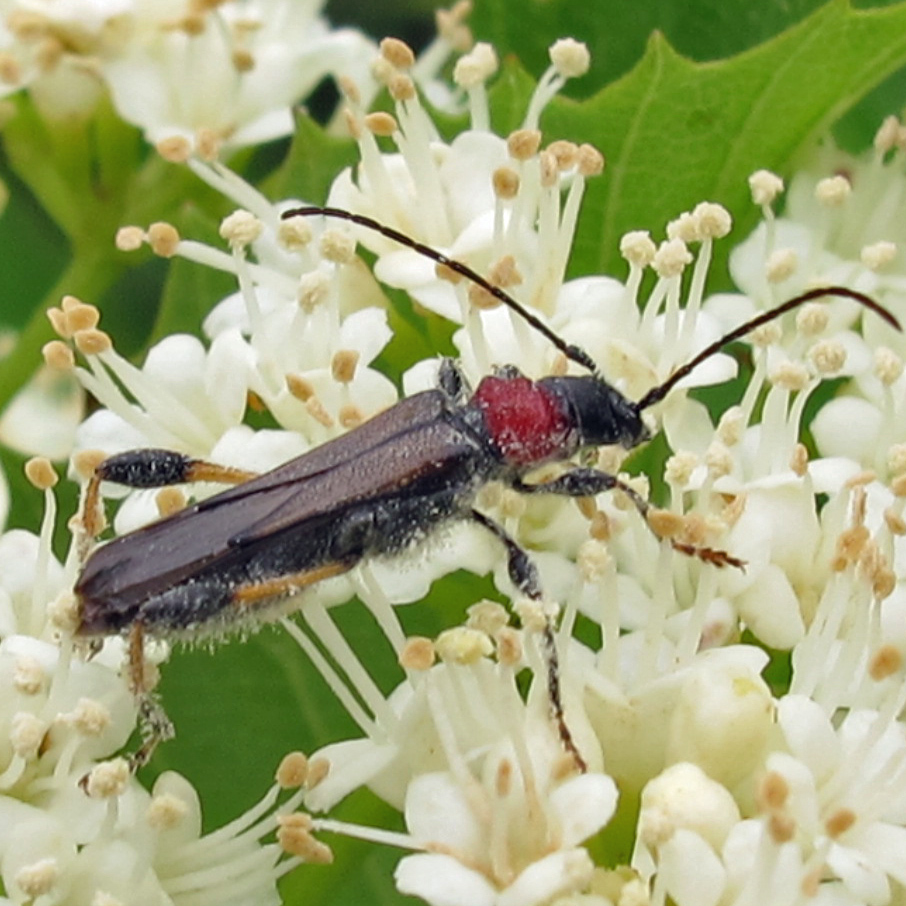
- Callimoxys sanguinicollis

Scientific classification
- Kingdom: Animalia
- Phylum: Arthropoda
- Clade: Pancrustacea
- Class: Insecta
- Order: Coleoptera
- Suborder: Polyphaga
- Infraorder: Cucujiformia
- Family: Cerambycidae
- Genus: Callimoxys
- Species: C. sanguinicollis

Binomial name
- Callimoxys sanguinicollis (Olivier, 1795)

= Callimoxys sanguinicollis =

Species of beetle

Callimoxys sanguinicollis is a species of beetle in the family Cerambycidae. It was described by Olivier in 1795.
