= Callimoxys ocularis =

Scientific classification
- Domain: Eukaryota
- Kingdom: Animalia
- Phylum: Arthropoda
- Class: Insecta
- Order: Coleoptera
- Suborder: Polyphaga
- Infraorder: Cucujiformia
- Family: Cerambycidae
- Genus: Callimoxys
- Species: C. ocularis

Binomial name
- Callimoxys ocularis Hammond & Williams, 2011

Species of beetle

Callimoxys ocularis is a species of beetle in the family Cerambycidae. It was described by Hammond and Williams in 2011.
