= Callimoxys fuscipennis =

Scientific classification
- Domain: Eukaryota
- Kingdom: Animalia
- Phylum: Arthropoda
- Class: Insecta
- Order: Coleoptera
- Suborder: Polyphaga
- Infraorder: Cucujiformia
- Family: Cerambycidae
- Genus: Callimoxys
- Species: C. fuscipennis

Binomial name
- Callimoxys fuscipennis (LeConte, 1861)

Species of beetle

Callimoxys fuscipennis is a species of beetle in the family Cerambycidae. It was described by John Lawrence LeConte in 1861.
