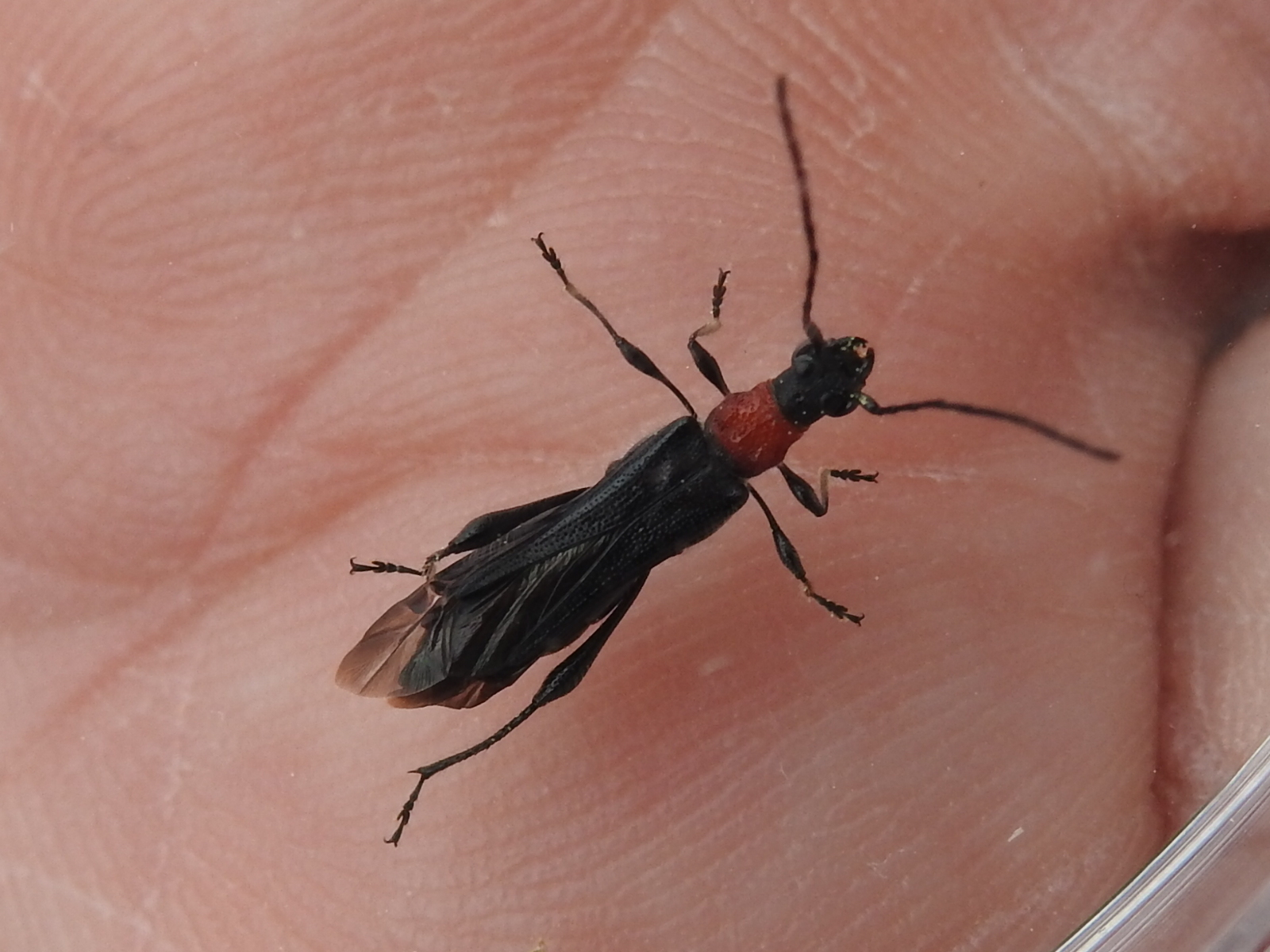
- Callimoxys nigrinus

Scientific classification
- Domain: Eukaryota
- Kingdom: Animalia
- Phylum: Arthropoda
- Class: Insecta
- Order: Coleoptera
- Suborder: Polyphaga
- Infraorder: Cucujiformia
- Family: Cerambycidae
- Genus: Callimoxys
- Species: C. nigrinus

Binomial name
- Callimoxys nigrinus Williams & Hammond, 2011

Synonyms
- Callimoxys nigrinis Williams & Hammond, 2011 (misspelling)

= Callimoxys nigrinus =

Species of beetle

Callimoxys nigrinus is a species of beetle in the family Cerambycidae. It was described in 2011.
