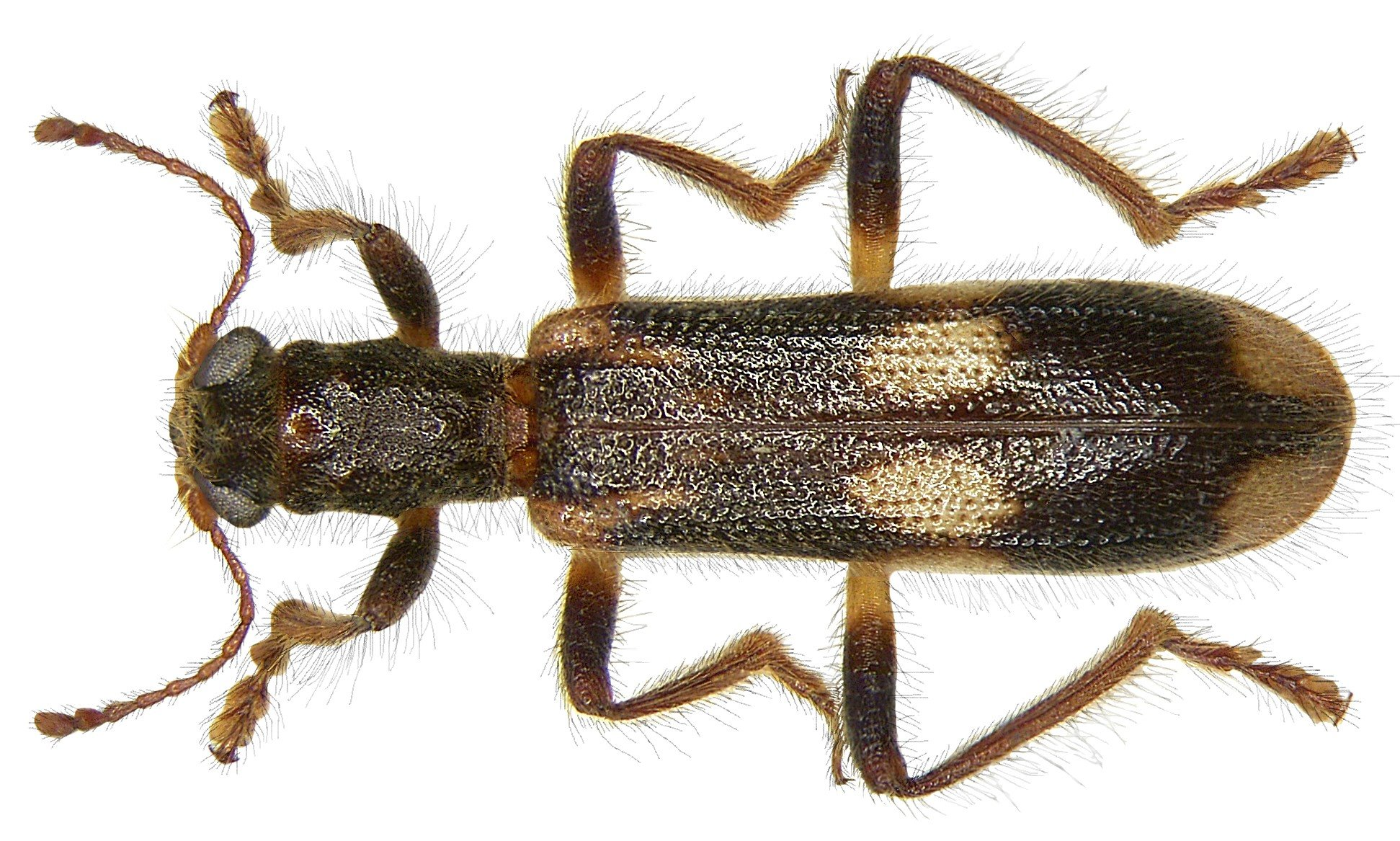

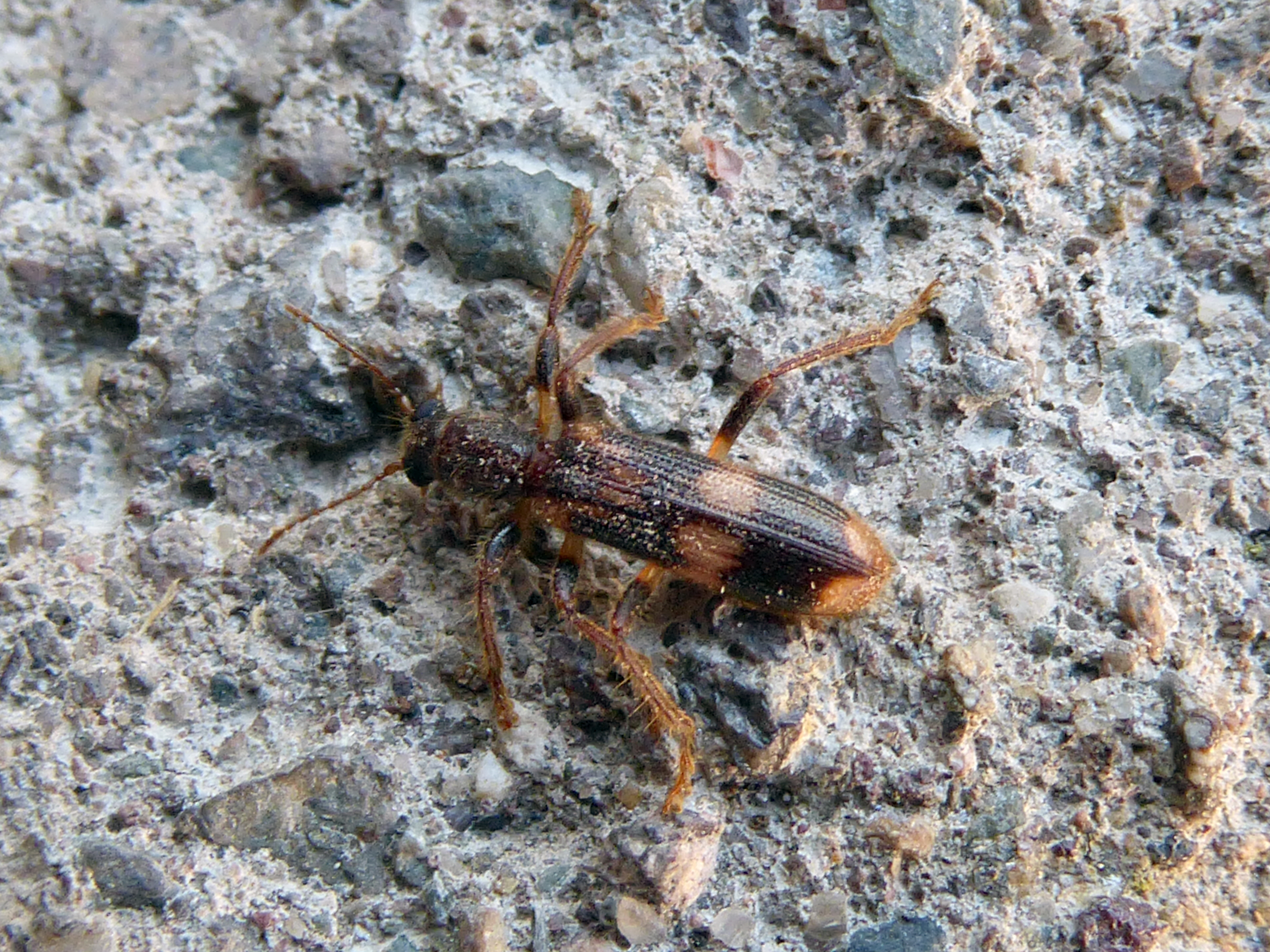

Scientific classification
- Kingdom: Animalia
- Phylum: Arthropoda
- Clade: Pancrustacea
- Class: Insecta
- Order: Coleoptera
- Suborder: Polyphaga
- Infraorder: Cucujiformia
- Family: Cleridae
- Genus: Opilo
- Species: O. mollis

Binomial name
- Opilo mollis (Linnaeus, 1758)

= Opilo mollis =

Species of beetle

Opilo mollis is a species of beetles in the subfamily Clerinae. The body is elongated body and measures 9-13 mm in length. It iscovered with light hair.The head is reddish-brow and coarsely punctured. The large compound eyes have lightly notched front edges, the long antennae have flattened basal segments and the maxillary palps have triangular terminal segments. The pronotum is matte dark brown and has a longitundinal groove that fades toward the back. The punctures on the pronotum are coarse and dense. The elytra are dark chestnut usually with a pattern of three pairs of yellow spots located on the shoulders, middle, and tips of the elytra. The rows of punctures on the elytra aren’t particularly deep and reach about halfway along their length; further back, the punctures become irregular. The tips of the femora are brown as are the tibiae . The underside of the body is dark.

This beetle is a saproxylic species. Both the larvae and the adult insects are predators, specialized in hunting larvae and adult forms of xylophagous and cambium-feeding insects. Their prey includes larvae and pupae of click beetles, weevils, bark beetles, and longhorn beetles. The beetle larvae develop in the feeding sites of cambium- and wood-eating insects on various tree species.

This species has become almost cosmopolitan due to being transported with wood to different parts of the world.
