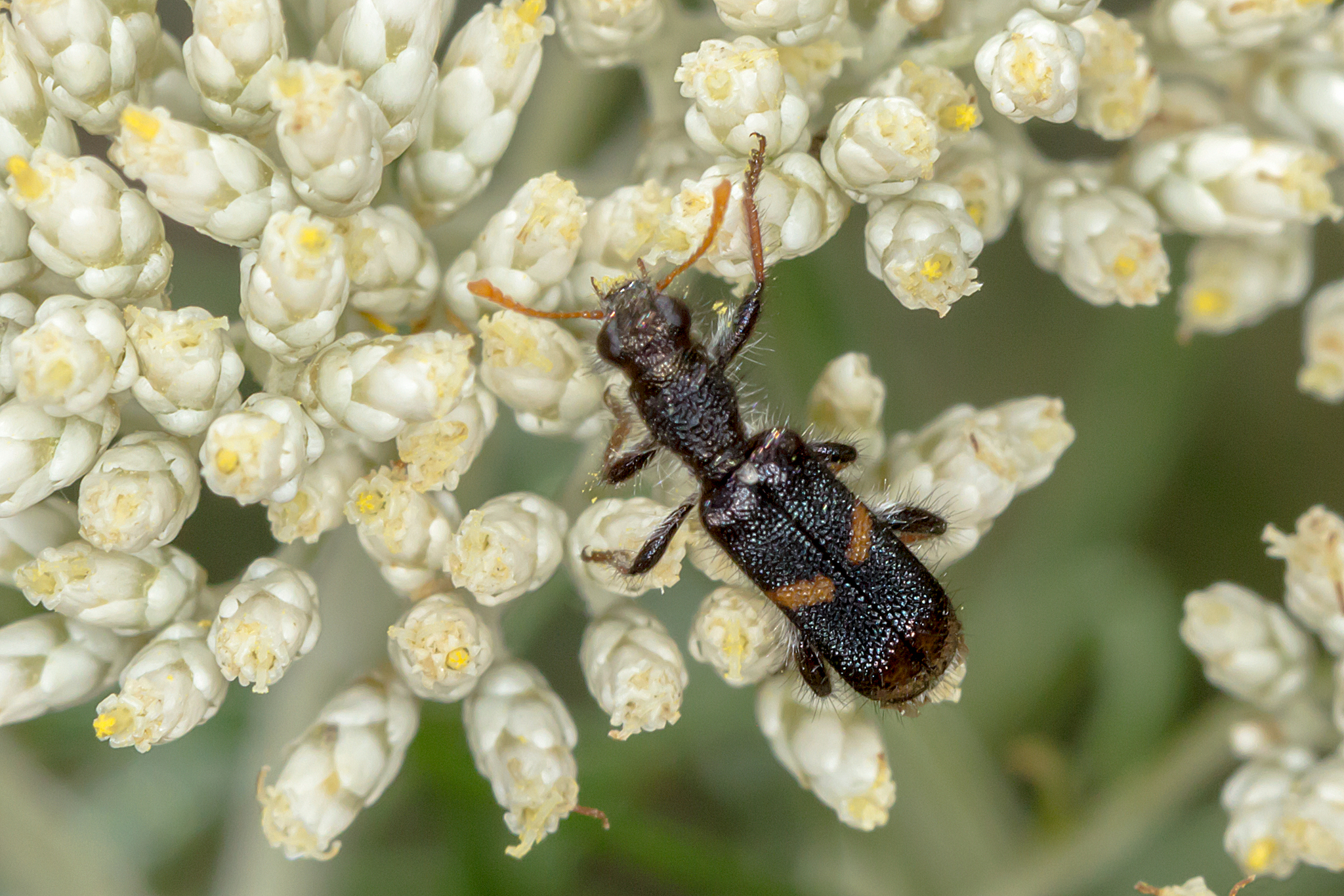
- Eleale pulcher, Australia

Scientific classification
- Domain: Eukaryota
- Kingdom: Animalia
- Phylum: Arthropoda
- Class: Insecta
- Order: Coleoptera
- Suborder: Polyphaga
- Infraorder: Cucujiformia
- Family: Cleridae
- Subfamily: Clerinae
- Genus: Eleale
- Species: E. pulcher

Binomial name
- Eleale pulcher (Newman, 1840)

= Eleale pulcher =

Species of beetle

Eleale pulcher is a species of checkered beetle in the family Cleridae, found in Australia.
