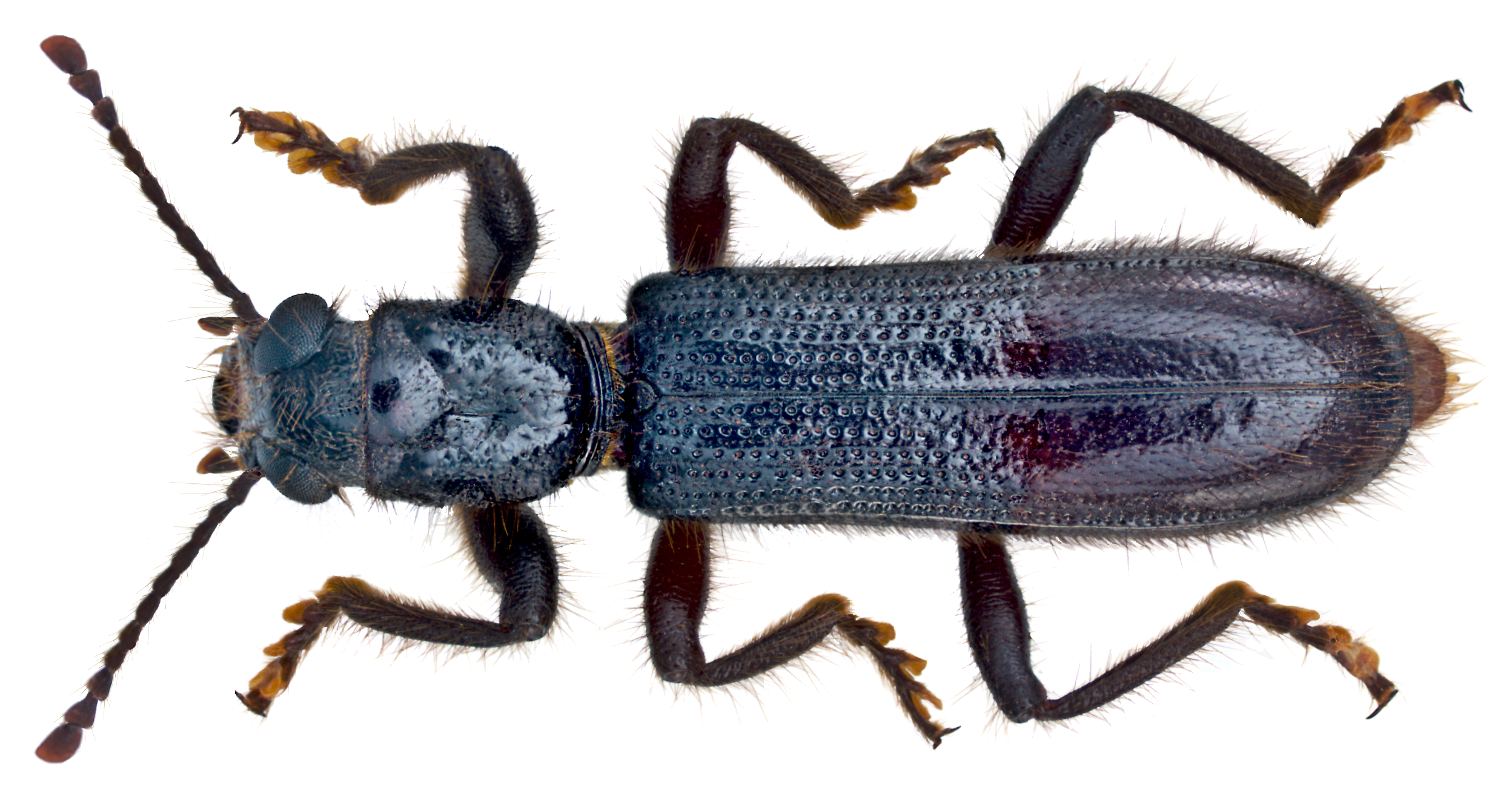
- Thanasimodes robustus in Tsavo West National Park, Kenya
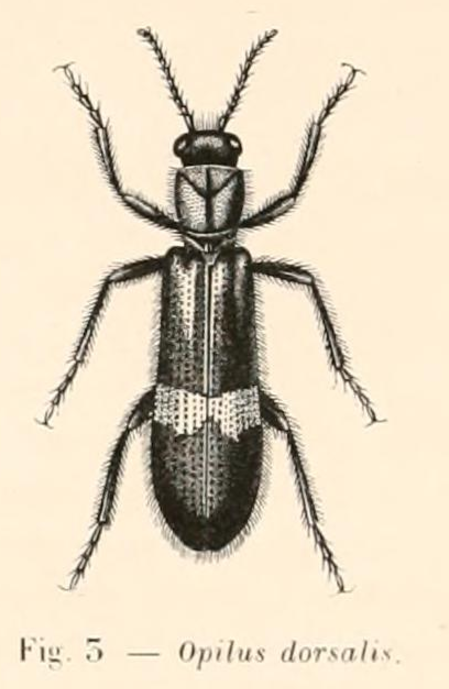
- T. dorsalis

Scientific classification
- Kingdom: Animalia
- Phylum: Arthropoda
- Clade: Pancrustacea
- Class: Insecta
- Order: Coleoptera
- Suborder: Polyphaga
- Infraorder: Cucujiformia
- Family: Cleridae
- Subfamily: Clerinae
- Genus: Thanasimodes; Murray, 1867

Type species
- Thanasimodes metallicus Murray, 1867

= Thanasimodes =

Genus of beetles

Thanasimodes is a genus of beetles in the subfamily Clerinae.

It was circumscribed by Andrew Murray in 1867.

== Species ==
Extant species include:

- Thanasimodes cyaneopurpureus (Fairmaire, 1885). Type locality: Mogadishu. (Note: "Makdischu".) Initially placed in Opilo. (Note: Written Opilus instead of Opilo in the initial description.)
- Thanasimodes desertorum (Lesne, 1905). Type locality: Iferouane. Initially placed in Opilio.
- Thanasimodes dorsalis (H. Lucas, 1843) Type locality: the north of Africa. (Note: "Du nord de l'Afrique".) Initially placed in Opilo.
  - Syn. T. luteofasciatus Pic 1932
- Thanasimodes gigas (Laporte de Castelnau, 1836). Type locality: Senegal. (Note: "Sénégal".) Initially placed in Notoxus.
  - Syn. T. abdominalis (Fairmaire, 1891); T. tropicus (Klug, 1842)
- Thanasimodes insignis (Escalera, 1914). Type locality: Kuraymat, Egypt. (Note: "El Kureimat".) Initially placed in Opilo.
- Thanasimodes metallicus Murray, 1867. Type locality: Akwa Akpa. (Note: "Old Calabar".)
- Thanasimodes robustus (Boheman, 1851) Type locality: Limpopo River. (Note: "In tractibus fluvii Limpoponis".) Initially placed in Opilo.

Fossil species include:

- †Thanasimodes jantar Kolibáč, 1997. Type locality: Baltic amber, Russia, dating from the Priabonian.

Species formerly placed in this genus include:

- Menieroclerus nigropiceus (Kuwert, 1893) Martlett and Gerstmeier 2016
