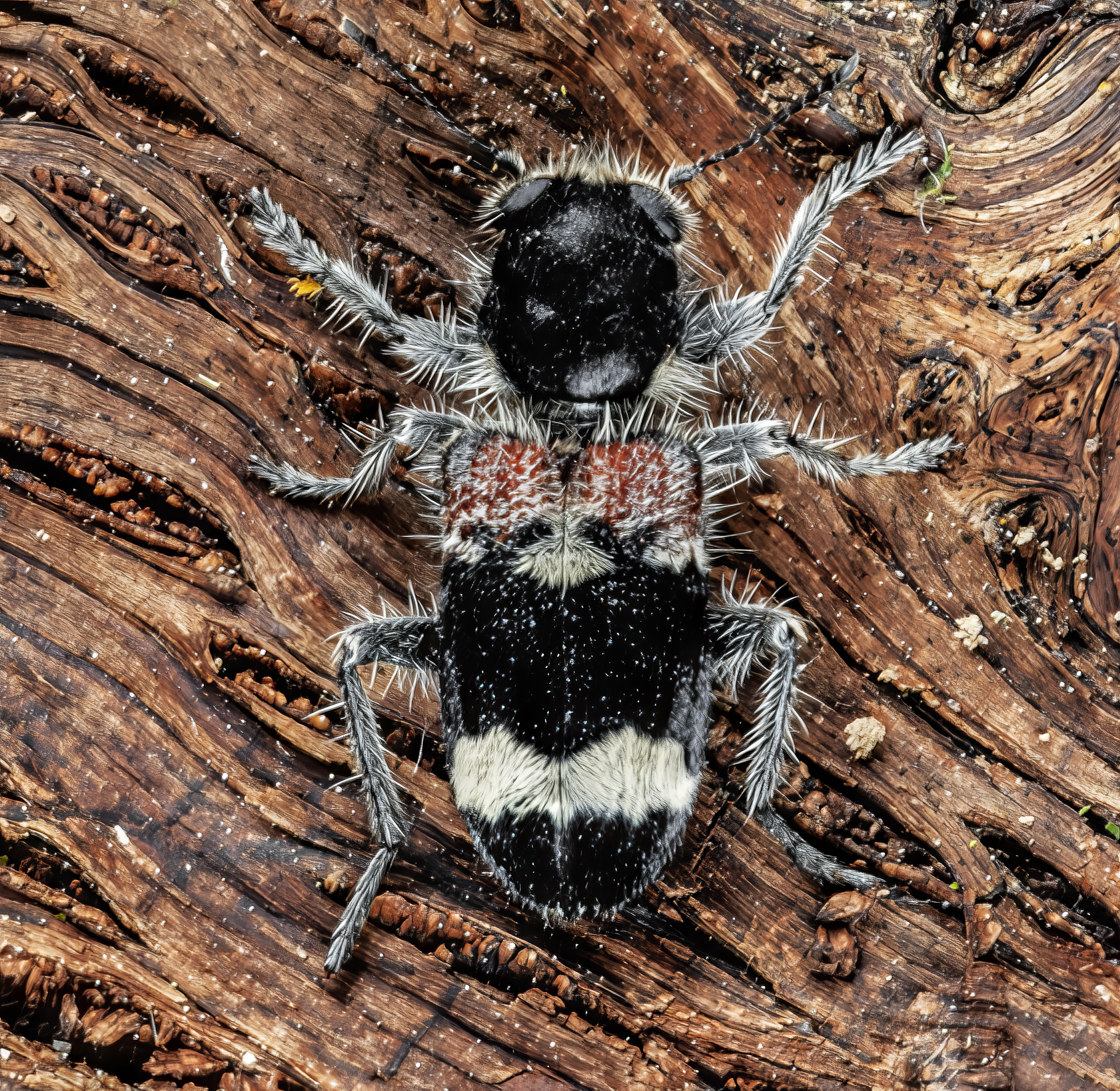
- Clerus mutillarius

Scientific classification
- Kingdom: Animalia
- Phylum: Arthropoda
- Class: Insecta
- Order: Coleoptera
- Suborder: Polyphaga
- Infraorder: Cucujiformia
- Family: Cleridae
- Genus: Clerus
- Species: C. mutillarius

Binomial name
- Clerus mutillarius Fabricius, 1775

= Clerus mutillarius =

Species of beetle

Clerus mutillarius is a species of beetles in the subfamily Clerinae.

== Gallery ==
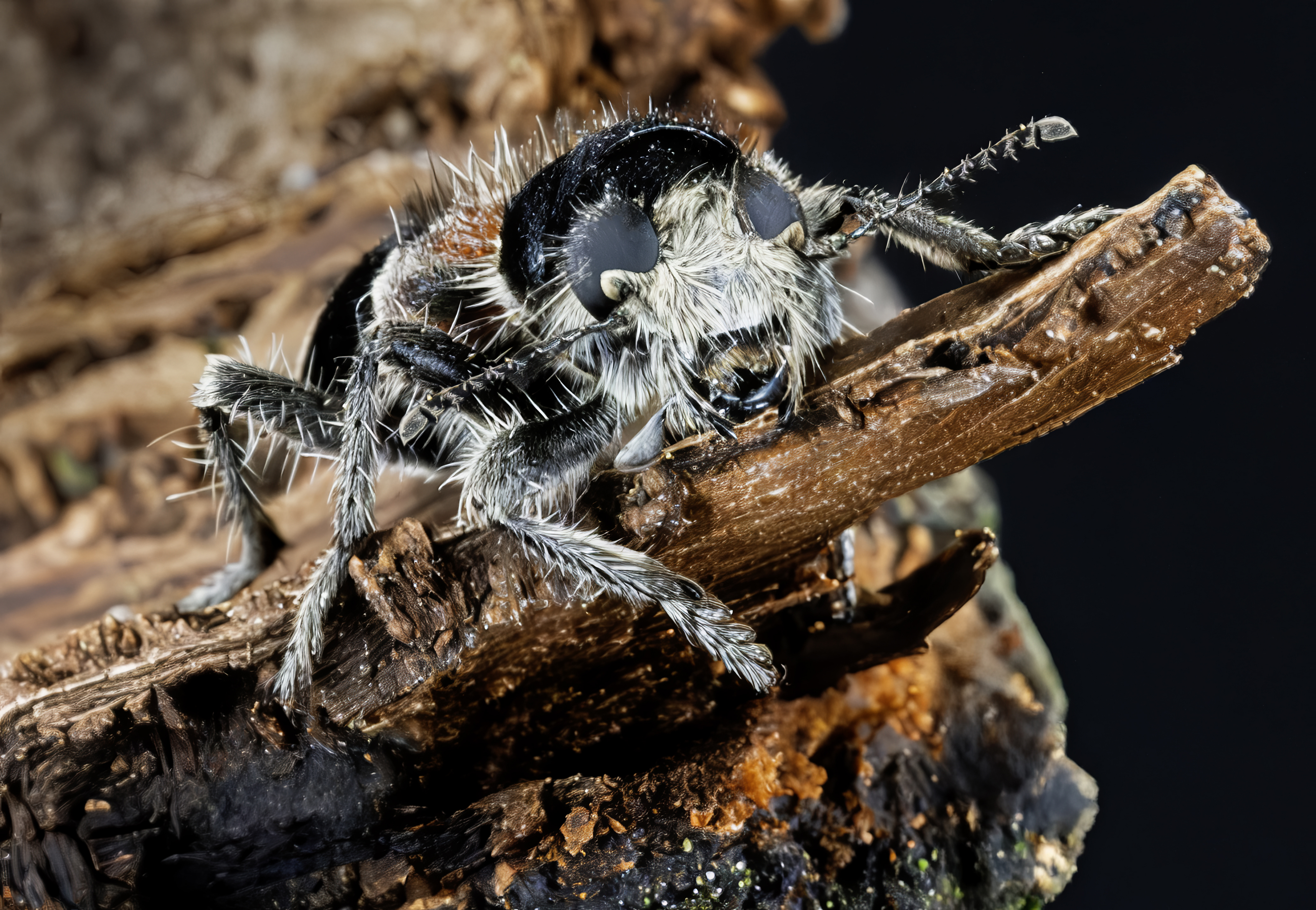
Clerus mutillarius portrait
