= Erymanthus =

Erymanthus or Erymanthos (Greek: Ερύμανθος) may refer to:

== Geography ==
- Erymanthos (municipality), a municipality of Achaea in the Peloponnese of Greece
- Erymanthos (river), a river in the Peloponnese
- Mount Erymanthos, a mountain range in Achaea and Elis, Peloponnese, Greece
- Erymanthus, an ancient Greek city of Arcadia later known as Psophis

== Mythology ==
- Erymanthian Boar, a beast hunted by Heracles
- Erymanthus (mythology), name of several mythological figures

== Biology ==
- Erymanthus (beetle), a checkered beetle genus in the subfamily Clerinae
