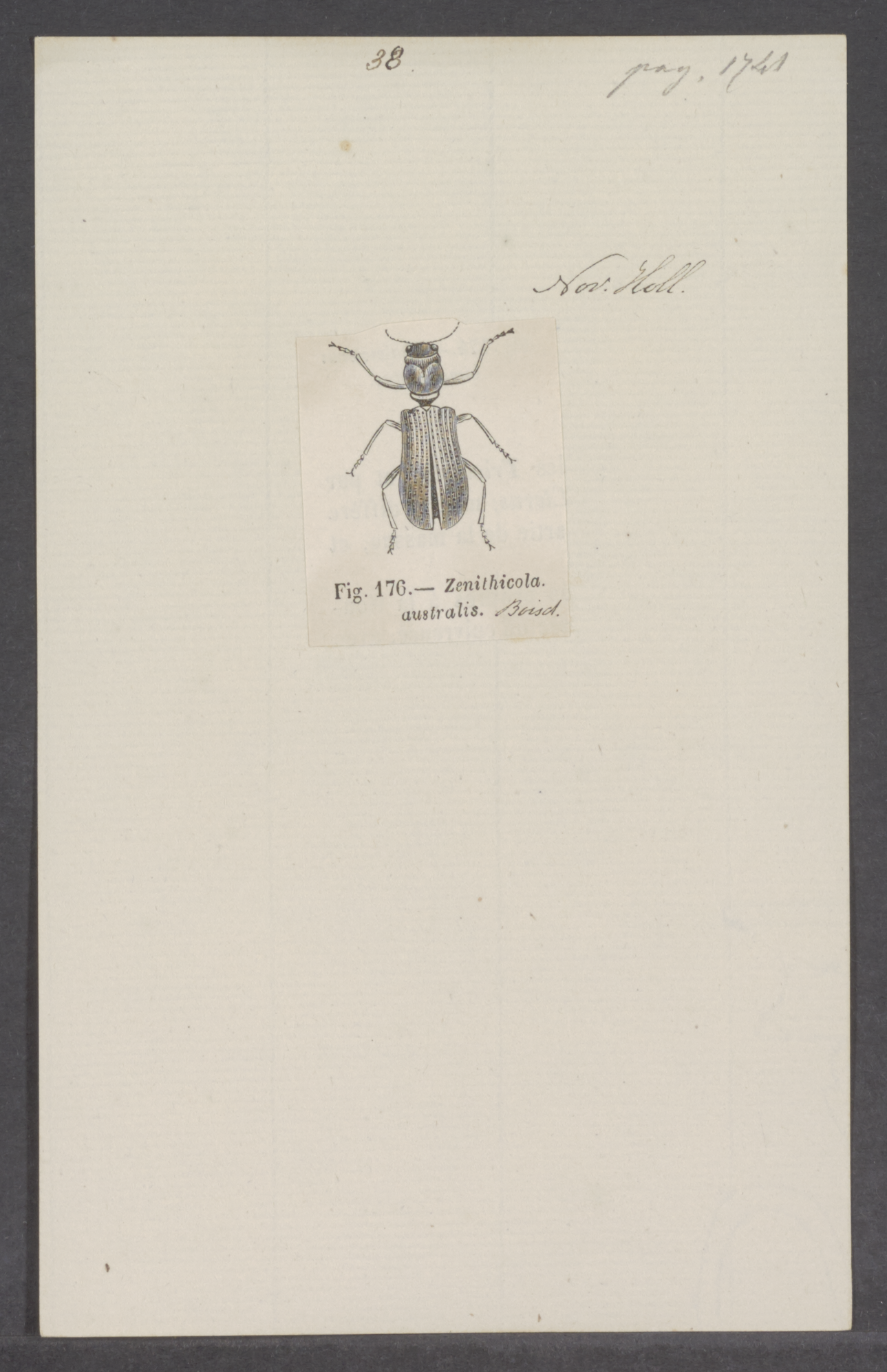
- Zenithicola australis

Scientific classification
- Kingdom: Animalia
- Phylum: Arthropoda
- Class: Insecta
- Order: Coleoptera
- Suborder: Polyphaga
- Infraorder: Cucujiformia
- Family: Cleridae
- Subfamily: Clerinae
- Genus: Zenithicola; Spinola, 1841

Type species
- Clerus australis Boisduval, 1835

Species
- Zenithicola australis; Zenithicola crassus; Zenithicola cribricollis; Zenithicola funestus; Zenithicola scrobiculatus; ?Zenithicola fulgens

= Zenithicola =

Genus of beetles

Zenithicola is a genus of beetles in the subfamily Clerinae.
