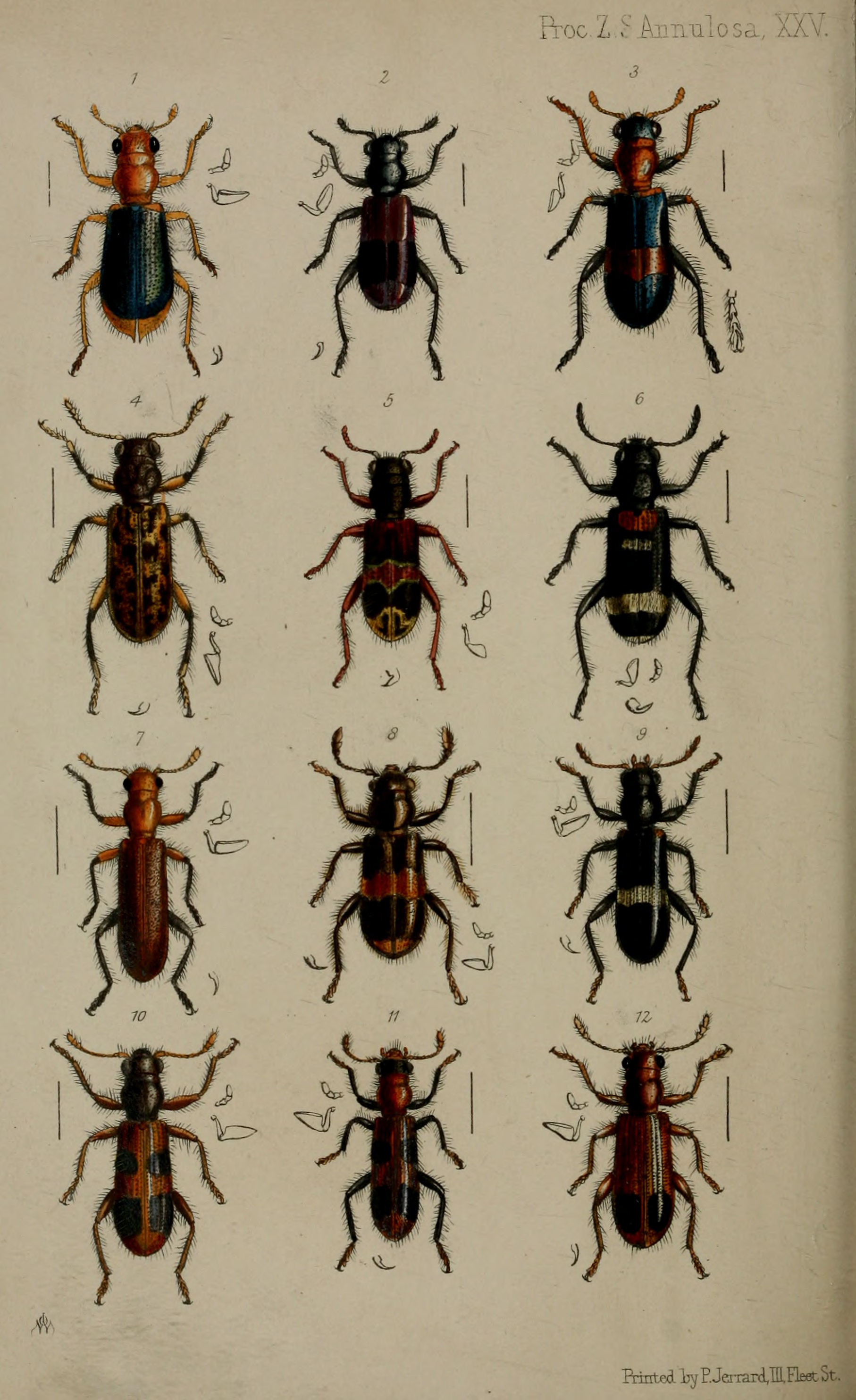
- 10. Clerus subfasciatus Westw., "India Orientali" = Xenorthrius subfasciatus (Westwood in White, 1849)

Scientific classification
- Kingdom: Animalia
- Phylum: Arthropoda
- Class: Insecta
- Order: Coleoptera
- Suborder: Polyphaga
- Infraorder: Cucujiformia
- Family: Cleridae
- Subfamily: Clerinae
- Genus: Xenorthrius

Species
- Xenorthrius subfasciatus

= Xenorthrius =

Genus of beetles

Xenorthrius is a genus of beetles in the subfamily Clerinae.
