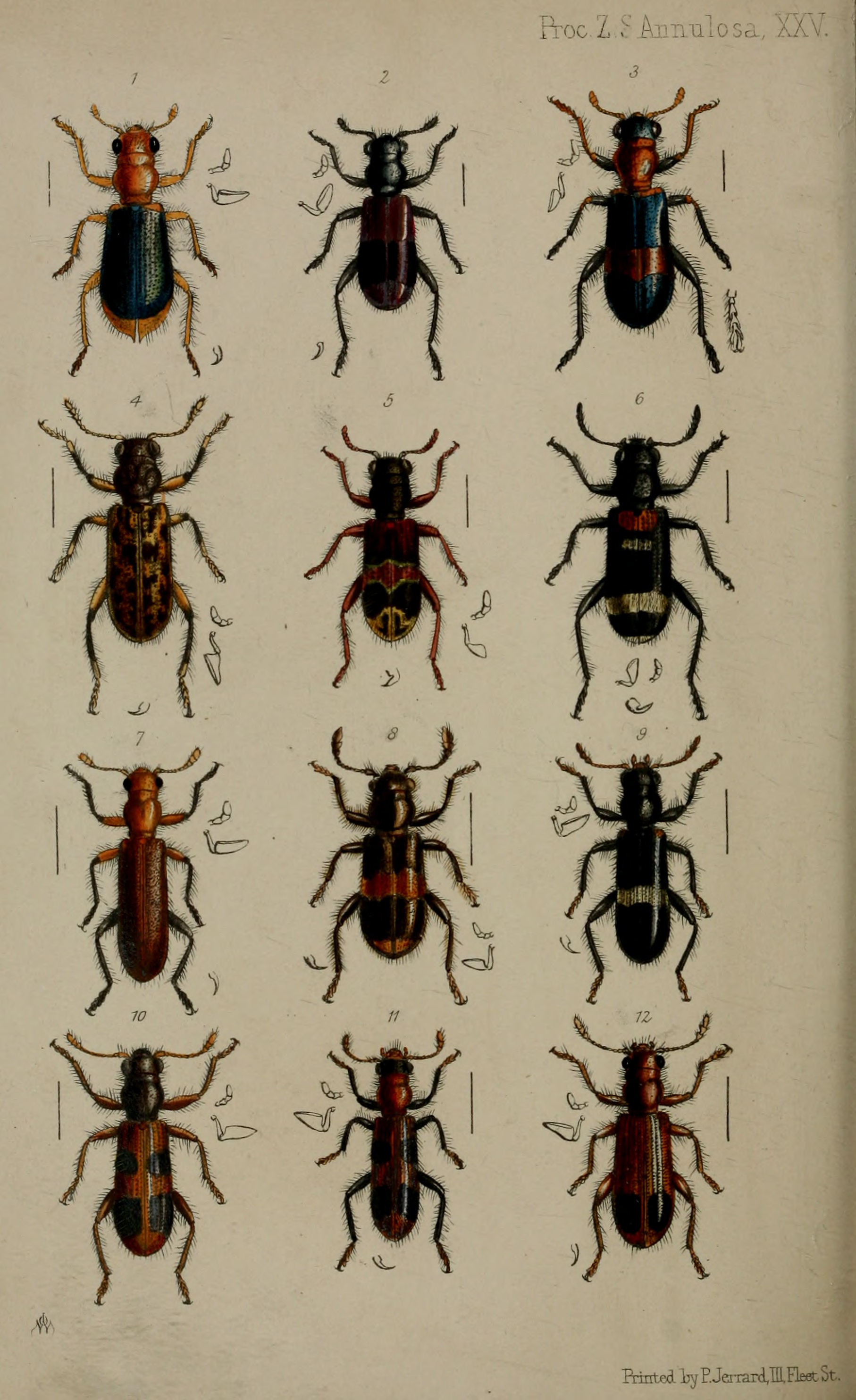
- 7. Clerus sanguinalis Westw., "Natal" = Aphelochroa sanguinalis (Westwood, 1852)

Scientific classification
- Kingdom: Animalia
- Phylum: Arthropoda
- Class: Insecta
- Order: Coleoptera
- Suborder: Polyphaga
- Infraorder: Cucujiformia
- Family: Cleridae
- Subfamily: Clerinae
- Genus: Aphelochroa; Quedenfeldt, 1885

Species
- Aphelochroa carneipennis; Aphelochroa sanguinalis

= Aphelochroa =

Genus of beetles

Aphelochroa is a genus of beetles in the subfamily Clerinae.
