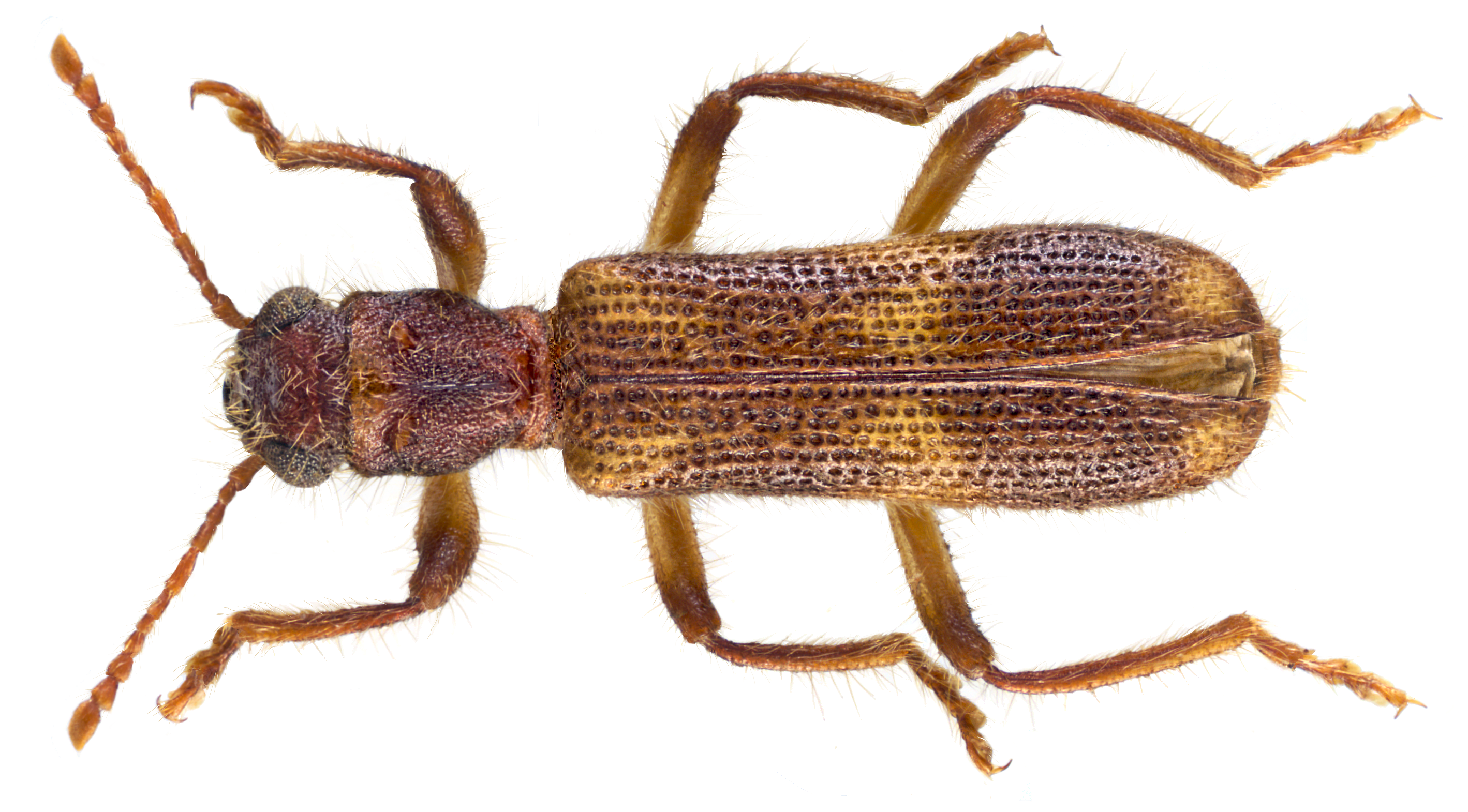

Scientific classification
- Domain: Eukaryota
- Kingdom: Animalia
- Phylum: Arthropoda
- Class: Insecta
- Order: Coleoptera
- Suborder: Polyphaga
- Infraorder: Cucujiformia
- Family: Cleridae
- Genus: Opilo
- Species: O. domesticus

Binomial name
- Opilo domesticus (Sturm, 1837)

= Opilo domesticus =

Species of beetle

Opilo domesticus is a species of checkered beetle in the family Cleridae. It is found in Africa, Europe and Northern Asia (excluding China), Central America, and North America.
