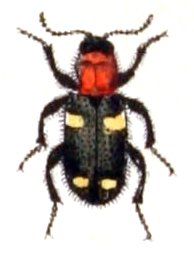

Scientific classification
- Kingdom: Animalia
- Phylum: Arthropoda
- Class: Insecta
- Order: Coleoptera
- Suborder: Polyphaga
- Infraorder: Cucujiformia
- Family: Cleridae
- Subfamily: Clerinae
- Genus: Allonyx; Jacquelin du Val, 1860
- Species: A. quadrimaculatus

Binomial name
- Allonyx quadrimaculatus (Schaller, 1783)

= Allonyx =

Genus of beetles

Allonyx is a monotypic genus of beetles in the subfamily Clerinae. The only species is Allonyx quadrimaculatus.
