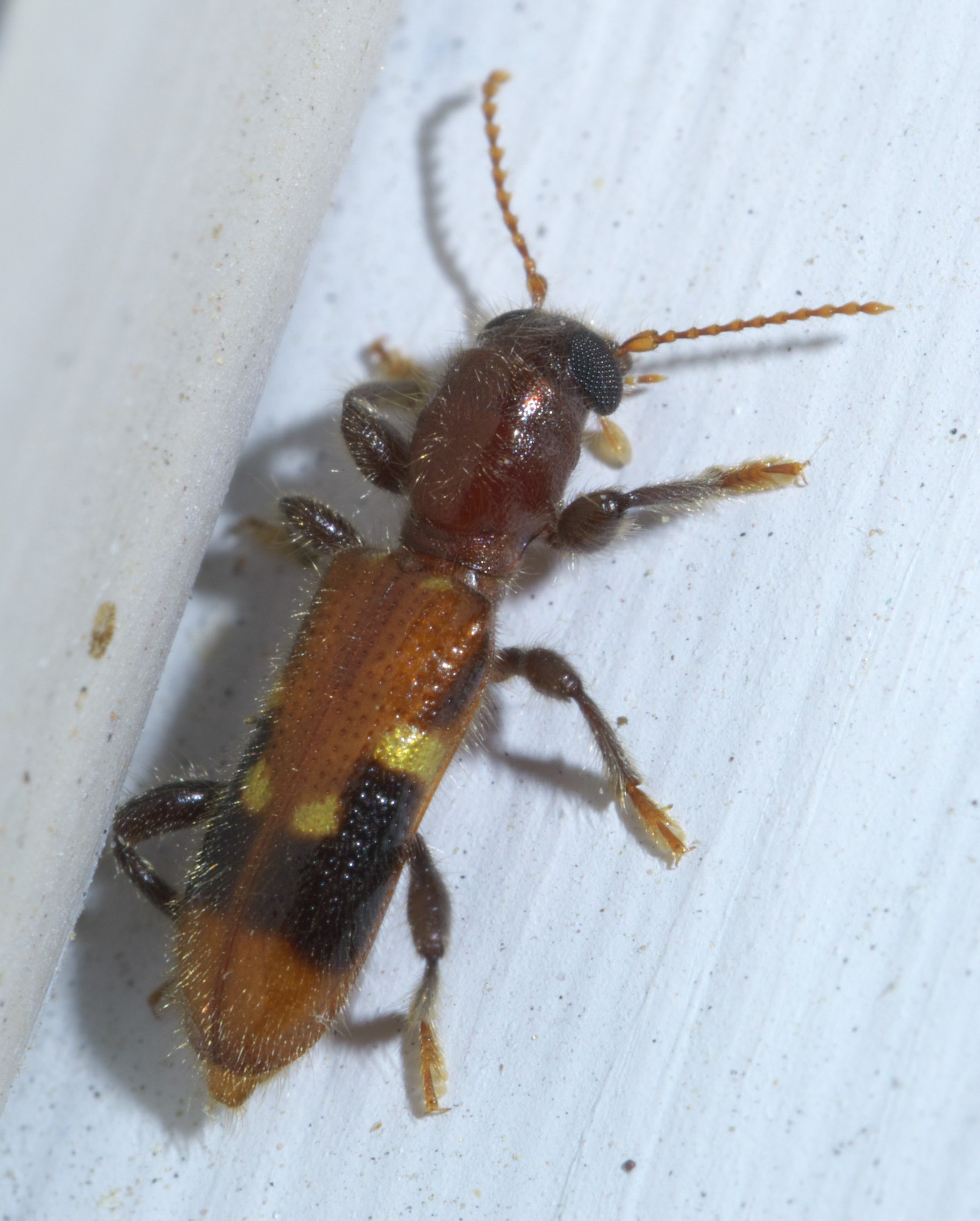

Scientific classification
- Domain: Eukaryota
- Kingdom: Animalia
- Phylum: Arthropoda
- Class: Insecta
- Order: Coleoptera
- Suborder: Polyphaga
- Infraorder: Cucujiformia
- Family: Cleridae
- Genus: Priocera
- Species: P. castanea

Binomial name
- Priocera castanea (Newman, 1838)

= Priocera castanea =

Species of beetle

Priocera castanea is a species of checkered beetle in the family Cleridae. It is found in North America.

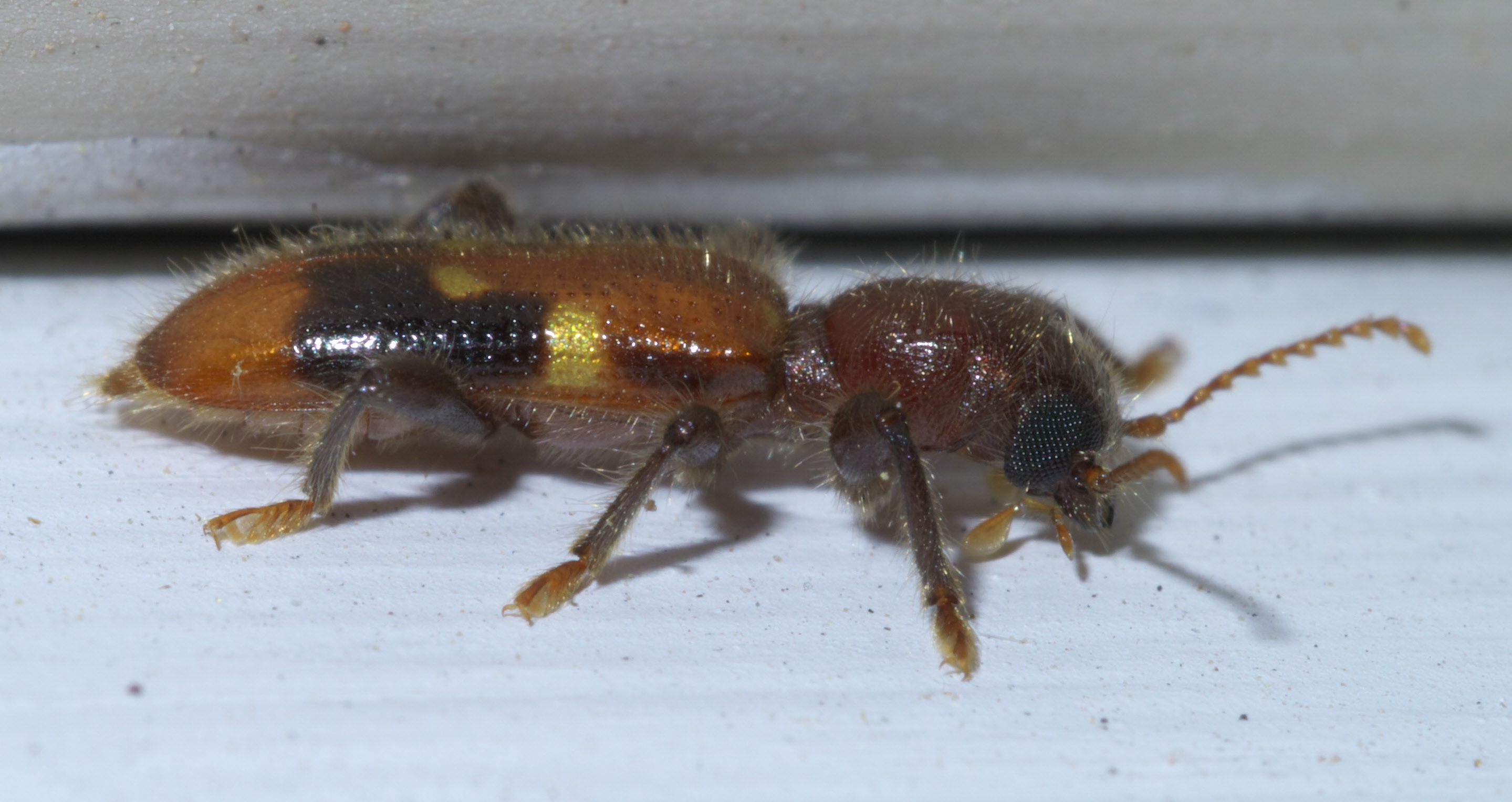

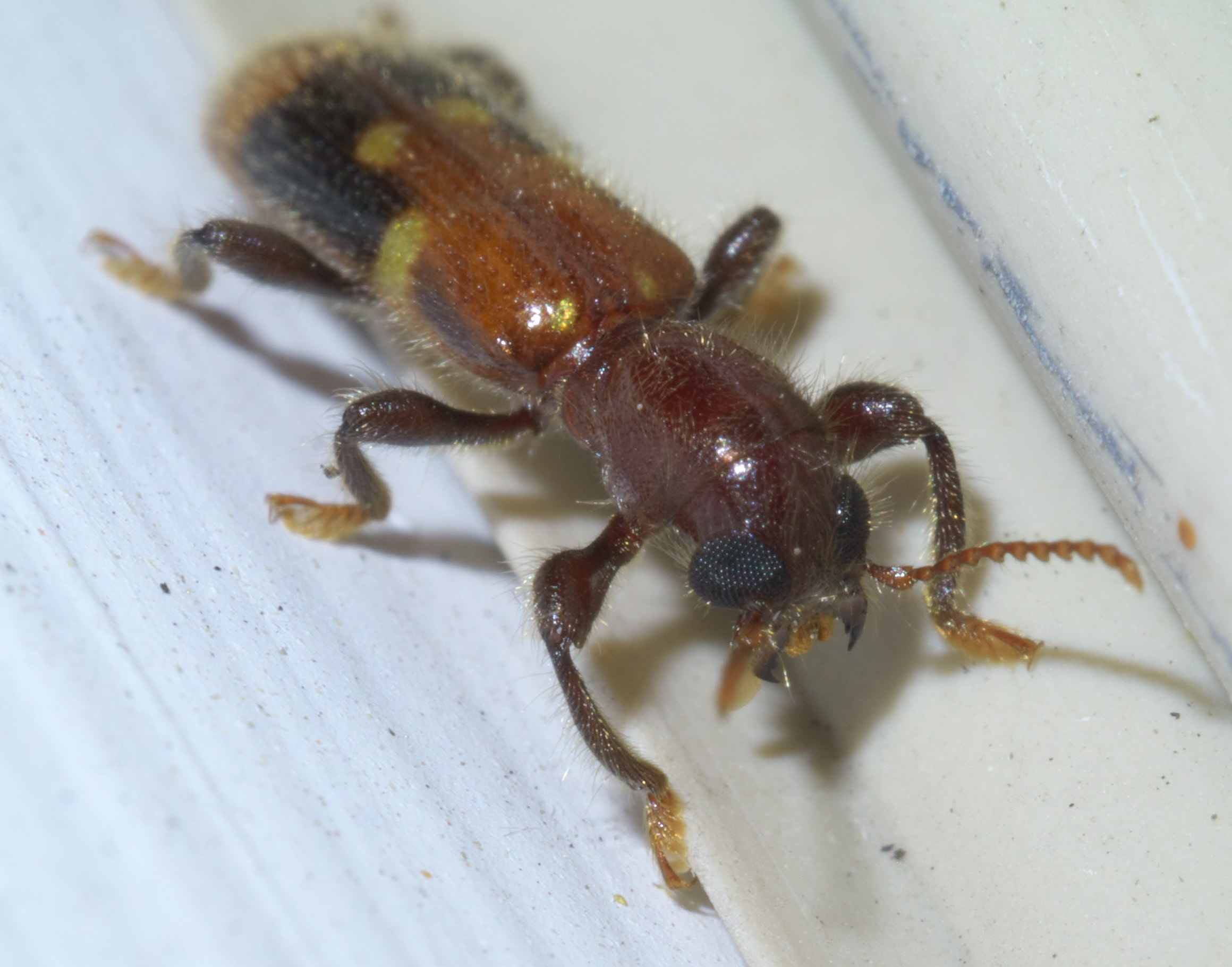
