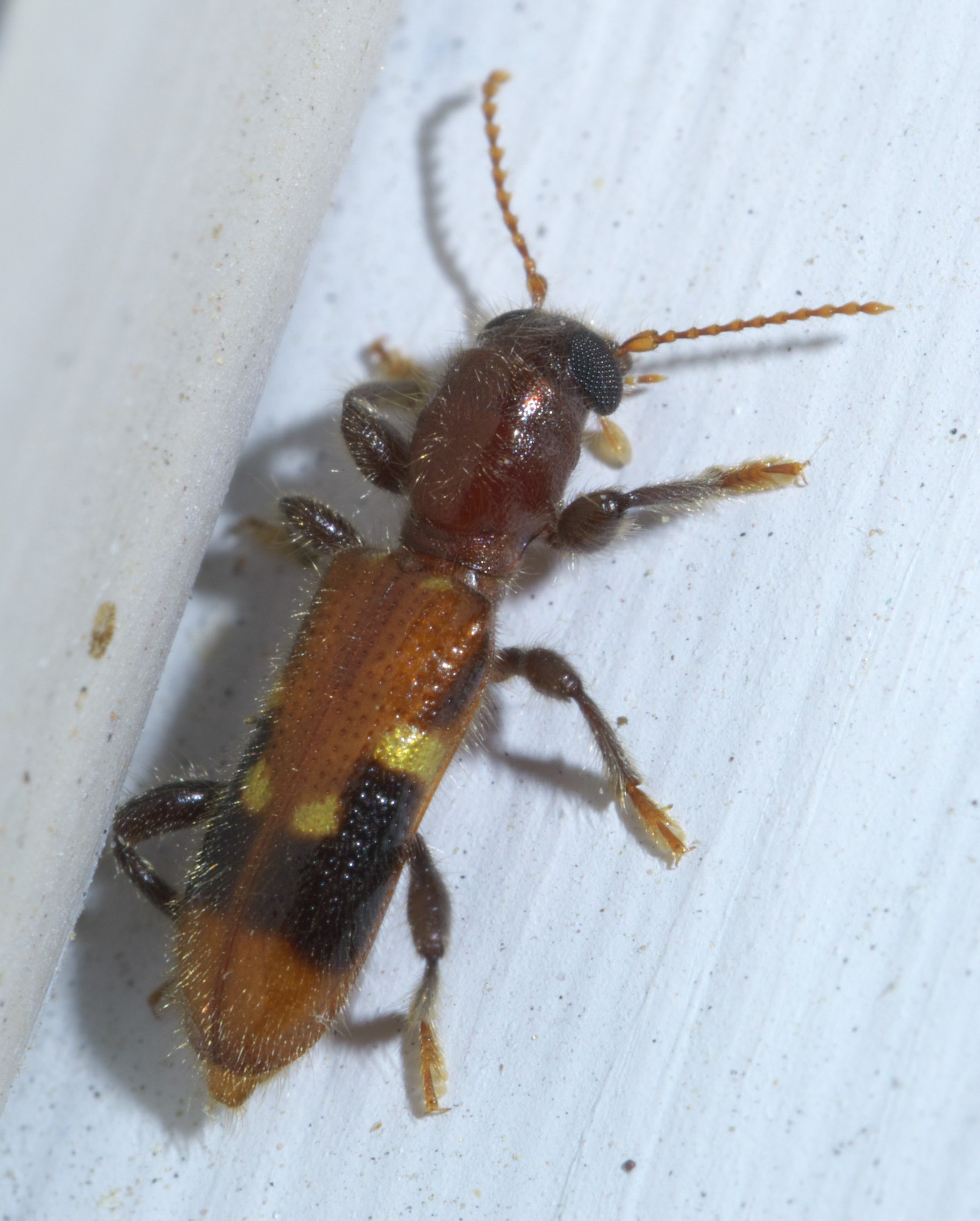
- Priocera castanea

Scientific classification
- Domain: Eukaryota
- Kingdom: Animalia
- Phylum: Arthropoda
- Class: Insecta
- Order: Coleoptera
- Suborder: Polyphaga
- Infraorder: Cucujiformia
- Family: Cleridae
- Subfamily: Clerinae
- Genus: Priocera; Kirby, 1818

= Priocera =

Genus of beetles

Priocera is a genus of checkered beetles in the family Cleridae. There are about seven described species in Priocera.

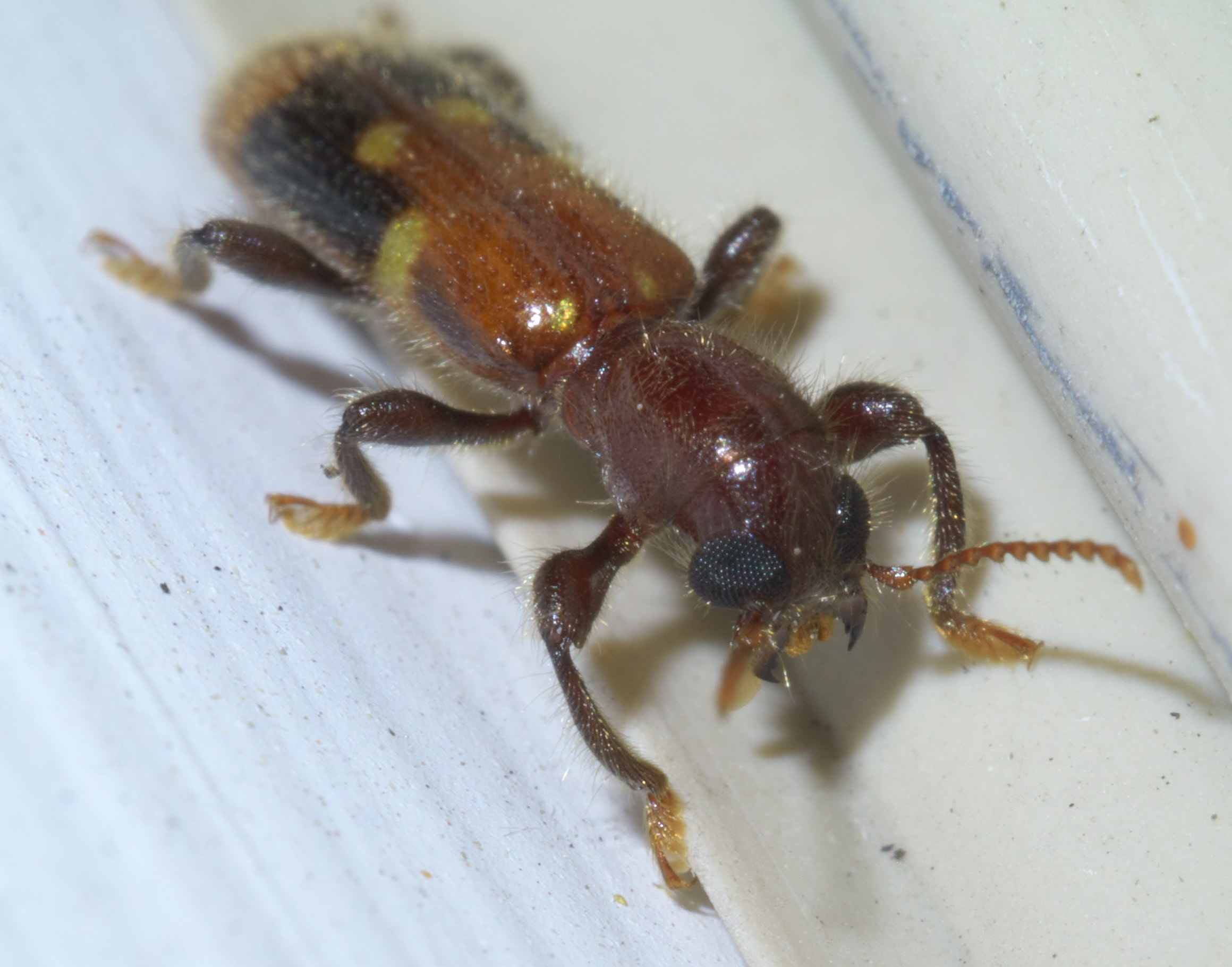
Priocera castanea

== Species ==
These seven species belong to the genus Priocera:

- Priocera apicalis Thomson, 1860^{g}
- Priocera aurosignata
- Priocera castanea (Newman, 1838)^{i c g b}
- Priocera catalinae Cazier, 1939^{i c g}
- Priocera chiricahuae Knull, 1939^{i c g b}
- Priocera pusilla Kirby, 1826^{i c g}
- Priocera quadrigibbosa Thomson, 1860^{g}
- Priocera spinosa (Fabricius, 1801)^{g}

Data sources: i = ITIS, c = Catalogue of Life, g = GBIF, b = Bugguide.net
