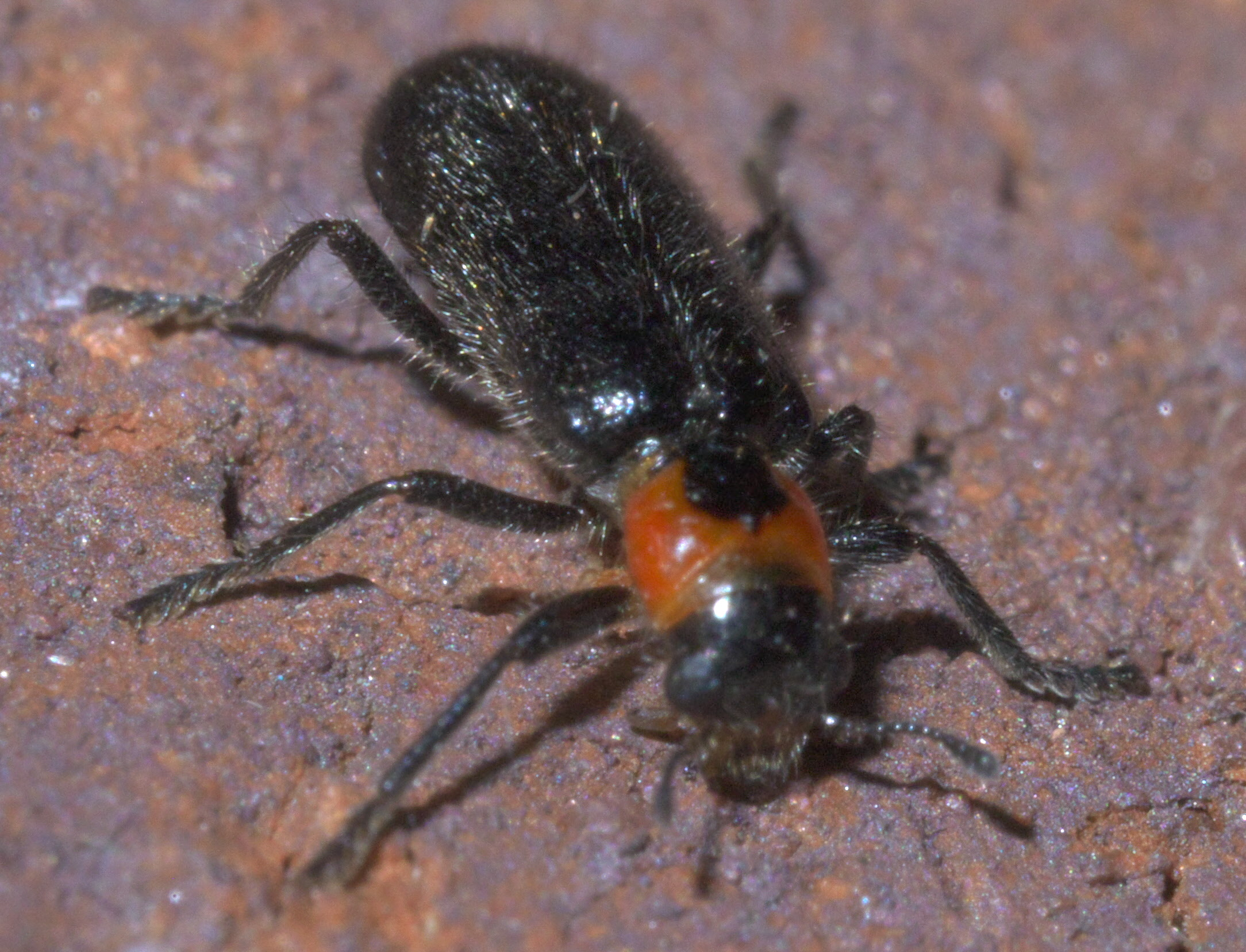

Scientific classification
- Kingdom: Animalia
- Phylum: Arthropoda
- Clade: Pancrustacea
- Class: Insecta
- Order: Coleoptera
- Suborder: Polyphaga
- Infraorder: Cucujiformia
- Family: Cleridae
- Genus: Placopterus
- Species: P. thoracicus

Binomial name
- Placopterus thoracicus (Olivier, 1795)

= Placopterus thoracicus =

Species of beetle

Placopterus thoracicus is a species of checkered beetle in the family Cleridae. It is found in Central America and North America.
