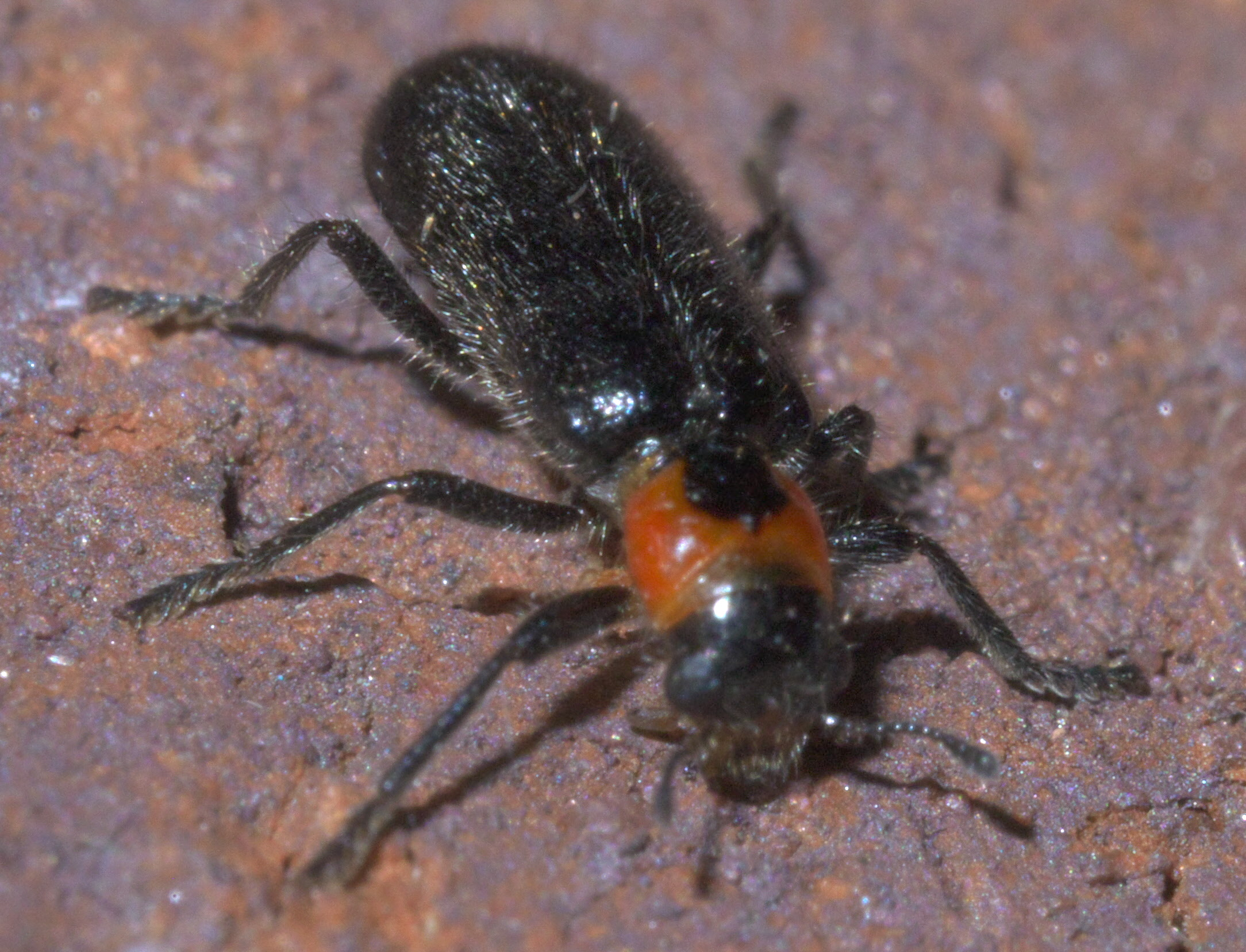
- Placopterus thoracicus

Scientific classification
- Domain: Eukaryota
- Kingdom: Animalia
- Phylum: Arthropoda
- Class: Insecta
- Order: Coleoptera
- Suborder: Polyphaga
- Infraorder: Cucujiformia
- Family: Cleridae
- Subfamily: Clerinae
- Genus: Placopterus; Wolcott, 1910

= Placopterus =

Genus of beetles

Placopterus is a genus of checkered beetles in the family Cleridae. There are at least four described species in Placopterus.

== Species ==
These four species belong to the genus Placopterus:

- Placopterus cyanipennis (Klug, 1842)
- Placopterus haagi (Chevrolat, 1876)
- Placopterus subcostatus (Schaeffer, 1917)
- Placopterus thoracicus (Olivier, 1795)
