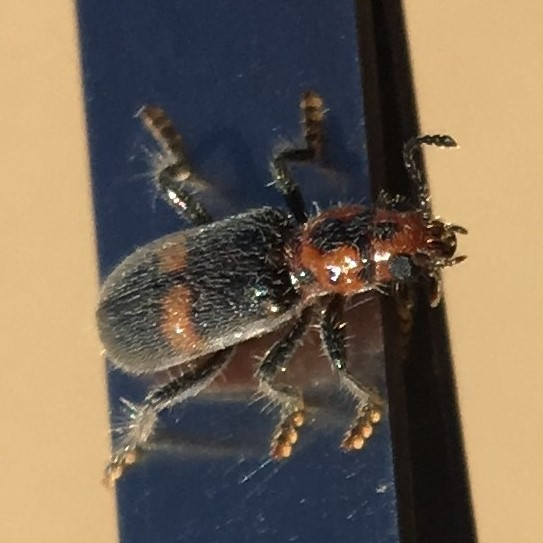
- Orthrius duplopunctatus

Scientific classification
- Kingdom: Animalia
- Phylum: Arthropoda
- Class: Insecta
- Order: Coleoptera
- Suborder: Polyphaga
- Infraorder: Cucujiformia
- Family: Cleridae
- Subfamily: Clerinae
- Genus: Orthrius; Gorham, 1876

Synonyms
- Tillopilo Winkler, 1958

= Orthrius =

Genus of beetles

Orthrius is a genus of beetles in the subfamily Clerinae.

== Taxonomy ==
Over fifty species are recognised in the genus Orthrius, including:

- Orthrius abdominalis (Germar)
- Orthrius bengalus (Westwood, 1852)
- Orthrius bicrucis Chapin, 1924
- Orthrius binotatus Fischer von Waldheim, 1829
- Orthrius brachialis Gorham, 1893
- Orthrius carinifrons Schenkling, 1912
- Orthrius cylindricus Gorham, 1876
- Orthrius discoidalis (Fairmaire)
- Orthrius dorsalis Schenklin
- Orthrius elongatus Corporaal
- Orthrius feae Gorham
- Orthrius gandalf Kolibáč, 1997
- Orthrius grandjeani Pic
- Orthrius madurensis Gorham
- Orthrius pallidus Chapin, 1924
- Orthrius posticalis (Westwood, 1852)
- Orthrius rufotestaceus Schenklin
- Orthrius sellatus (Westwood, 1852)
- Orthrius sepulcralis (Westwood, 1852)
- Orthrius sexplagiatus Schenklin
- Orthrius striatopunctatus Schenklin
- Orthrius sufasciatus Westwood
- Orthrius subsimilis White
- Orthrius succini Menier, 1983
- Orthrius tarsalis Gorham
- Orthrius tuberculicollis Schenklin
