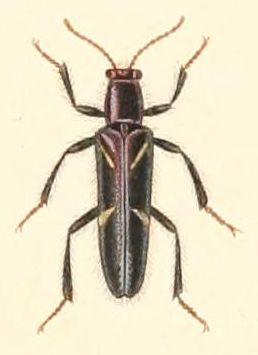
- Epiclines gayi

Scientific classification
- Kingdom: Animalia
- Phylum: Arthropoda
- Class: Insecta
- Order: Coleoptera
- Suborder: Polyphaga
- Infraorder: Cucujiformia
- Family: Cleridae
- Subfamily: Clerinae
- Genus: Epiclines; Chevrolat in Guérin-Ménéville, 1839

Synonyms
- Astylosoma Pic, 1903

= Epiclines =

Genus of beetles

Epiclines is a genus of beetles in the subfamily Clerinae. It is a monotypic genus containing only the species E. gayi.
