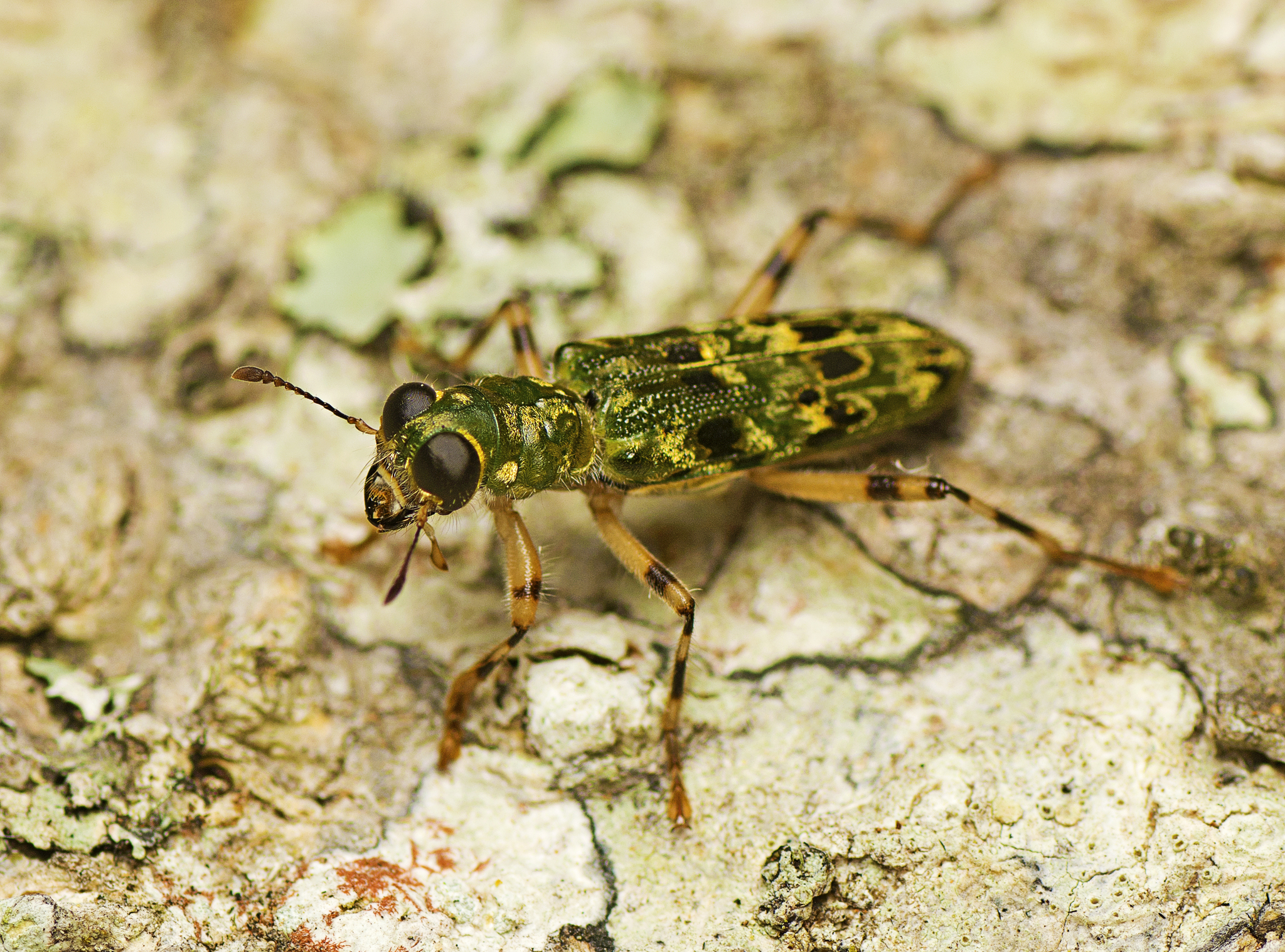
- Omadius prasinus

Scientific classification
- Kingdom: Animalia
- Phylum: Arthropoda
- Class: Insecta
- Order: Coleoptera
- Suborder: Polyphaga
- Infraorder: Cucujiformia
- Family: Cleridae
- Subfamily: Clerinae
- Genus: Omadius; Laporte de Castelnau, 1836

Species
- Omadius abscissus; Omadius mediofasciatus; Omadius olivaceus; Omadius prasinus; Omadius vespiformis; Omadius zebratus

= Omadius =

Genus of beetles

Omadius is a genus of beetles in the subfamily Clerinae.
