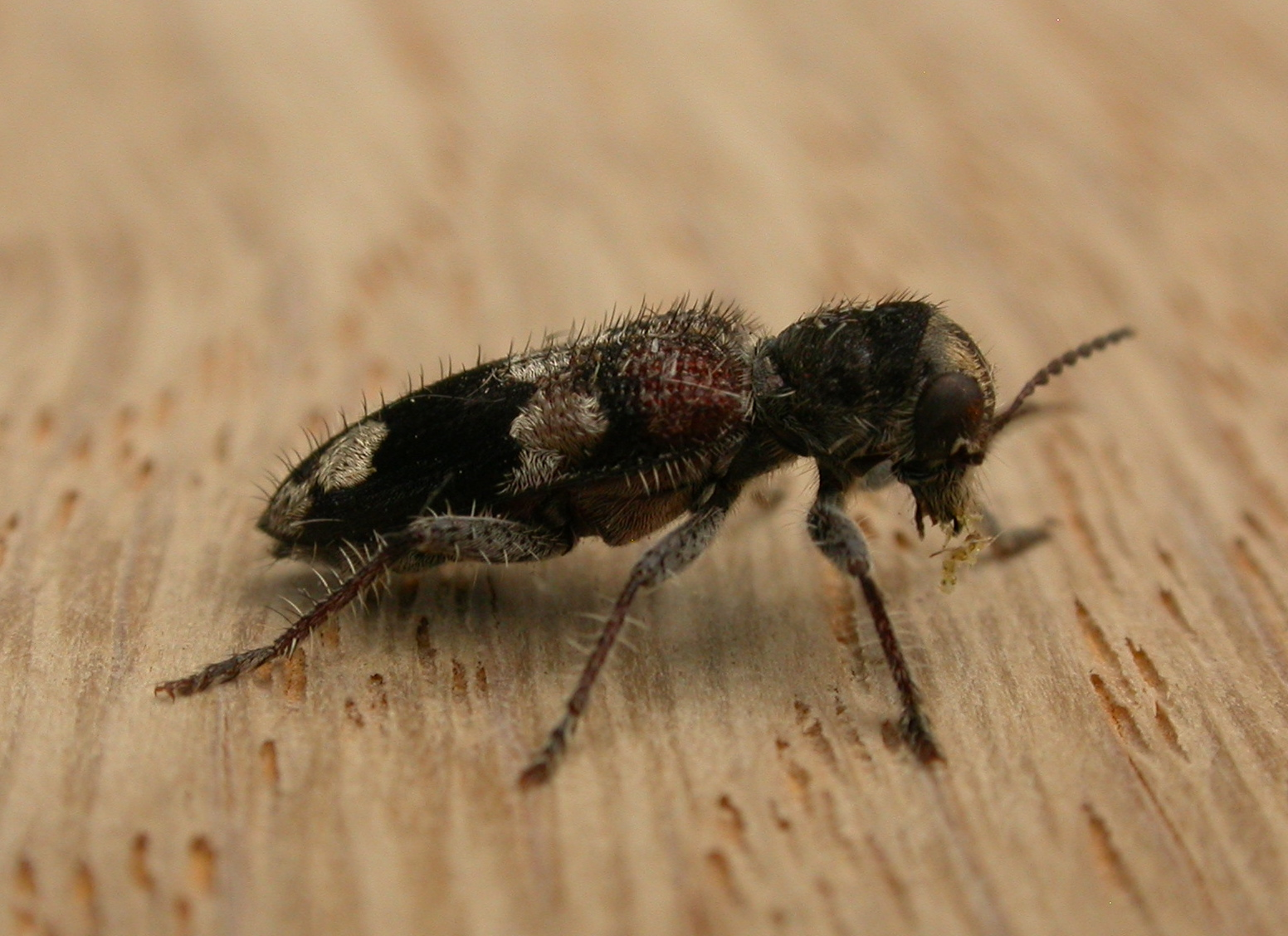
- Stigmatium gilberti White, 1849

Scientific classification
- Kingdom: Animalia
- Phylum: Arthropoda
- Class: Insecta
- Order: Coleoptera
- Suborder: Polyphaga
- Infraorder: Cucujiformia
- Family: Cleridae
- Subfamily: Clerinae
- Genus: Stigmatium; Gray in Griffith, 1832

Species
- Stigmatium ceramboides; Stigmatium cursorium; Stigmatium dorsigerum; Stigmatium nebuliferum; Stigmatium rufiventris; Stigmatium gilberti

= Stigmatium =

Genus of beetles

Stigmatium is a genus of beetles in the subfamily Clerinae.
