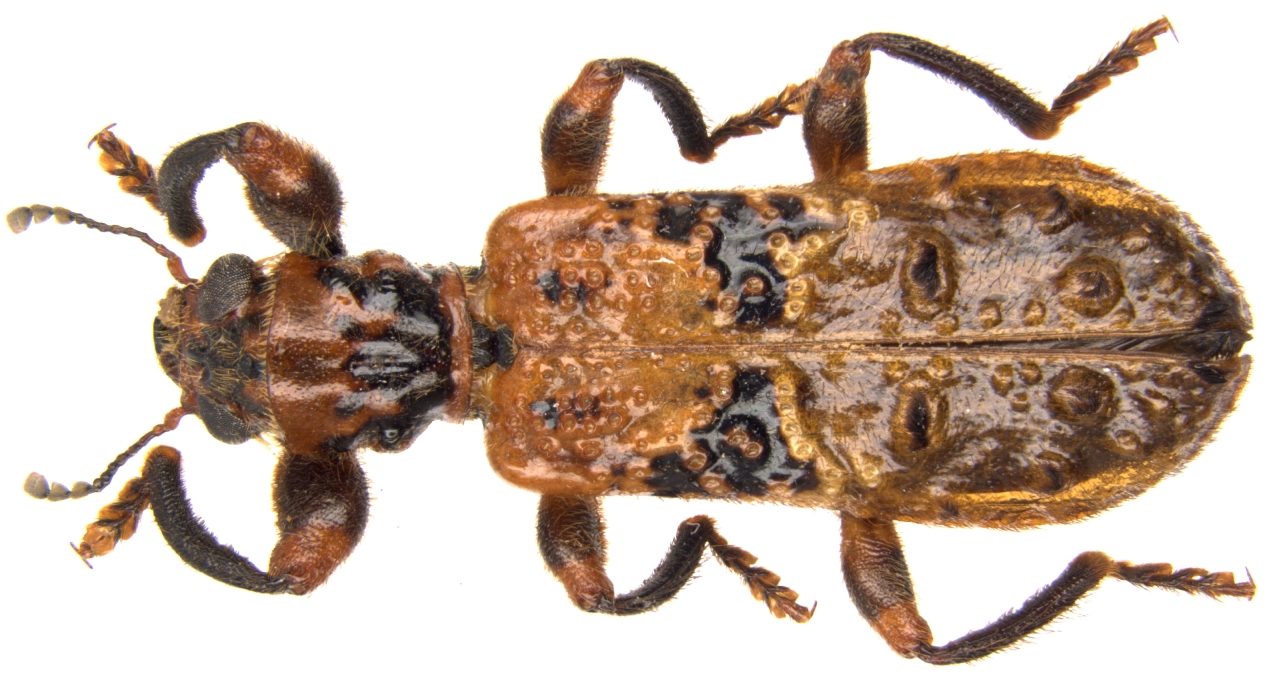
- Erymanthus transversopustulatus

Scientific classification
- Domain: Eukaryota
- Kingdom: Animalia
- Phylum: Arthropoda
- Class: Insecta
- Order: Coleoptera
- Suborder: Polyphaga
- Infraorder: Cucujiformia
- Family: Cleridae
- Subfamily: Clerinae
- Genus: Erymanthus; Spinola, 1841

= Erymanthus (beetle) =

Genus of beetles

Erymanthus is a genus of checkered beetles in the subfamily Clerinae.

== Species ==
These 16 species belong to the genus Erymanthus:

- Erymanthus ater Hintz, 1905
- Erymanthus belzebuth Thomson, 1856
- Erymanthus bicolor Chapin, 1924
- Erymanthus diversipes Pic, 1932
- Erymanthus flavonotatus Pic, 1932
- Erymanthus gemmatus Klug, 1842
- Erymanthus horridus Westwood, 1852
- Erymanthus maculaticeps Pic, 1949
- Erymanthus melanurus Kuwert, 1893
- Erymanthus pustulosus Quedenfeldt, 1888
- Erymanthus revoili Fairmaire, 1887
- Erymanthus semirufus Kuwert, 1893
- Erymanthus testaceus Pic, 1950
- Erymanthus transversopustulatus Gerstmeier & Salvamoser, 2013
- Erymanthus variolatus Brême, 1844
- Erymanthus vesuvioides Thomson, 1856
