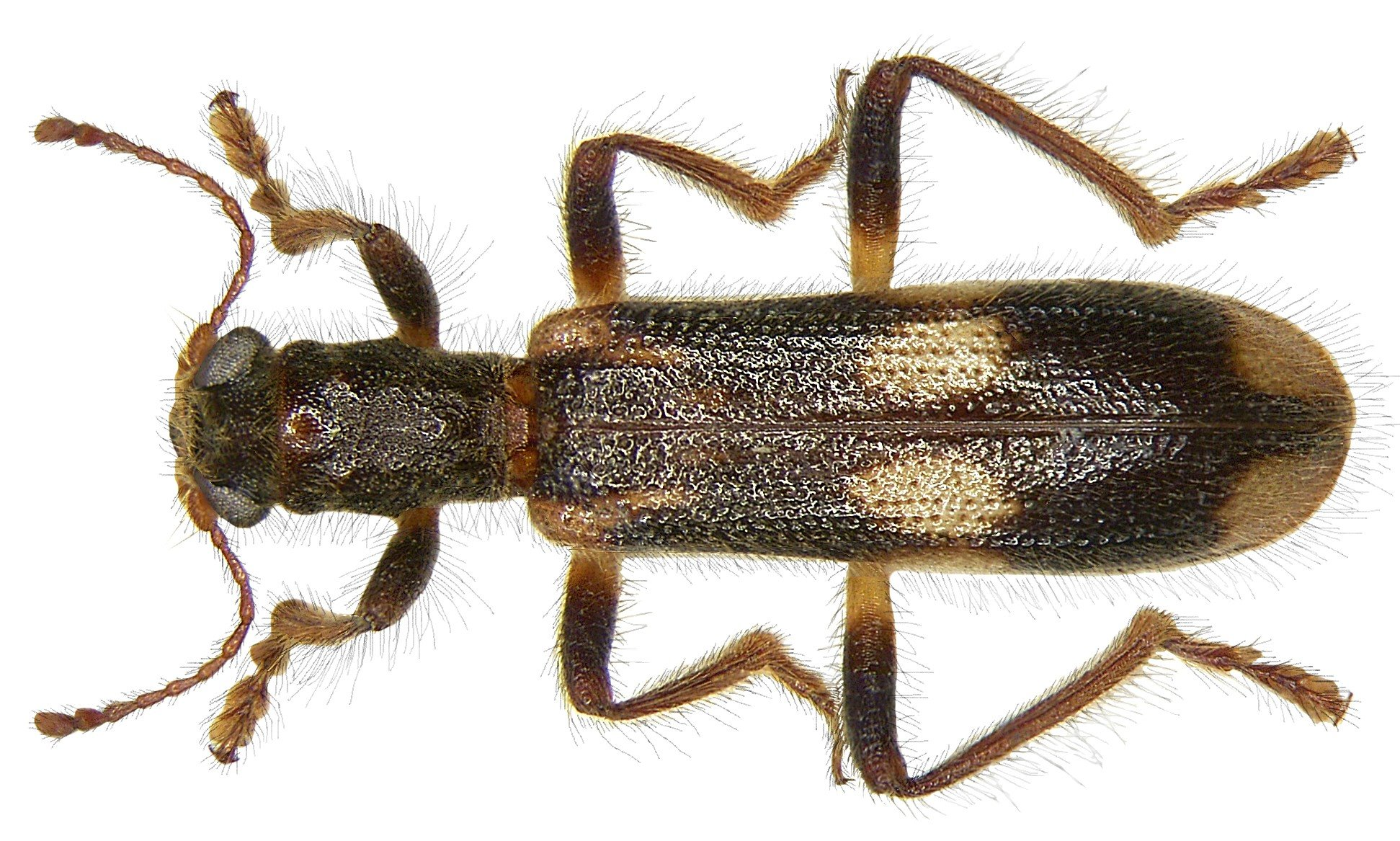
- Opilo mollis (Linné, 1758)

Scientific classification
- Kingdom: Animalia
- Phylum: Arthropoda
- Class: Insecta
- Order: Coleoptera
- Suborder: Polyphaga
- Infraorder: Cucujiformia
- Family: Cleridae
- Subfamily: Clerinae
- Genus: Opilo; Latreille, 1802

Species
- Opilo domesticus; Opilo mollis; Opilo sordidus

= Opilo =

Genus of beetles

Opilo is a genus of beetles in the subfamily Clerinae.
