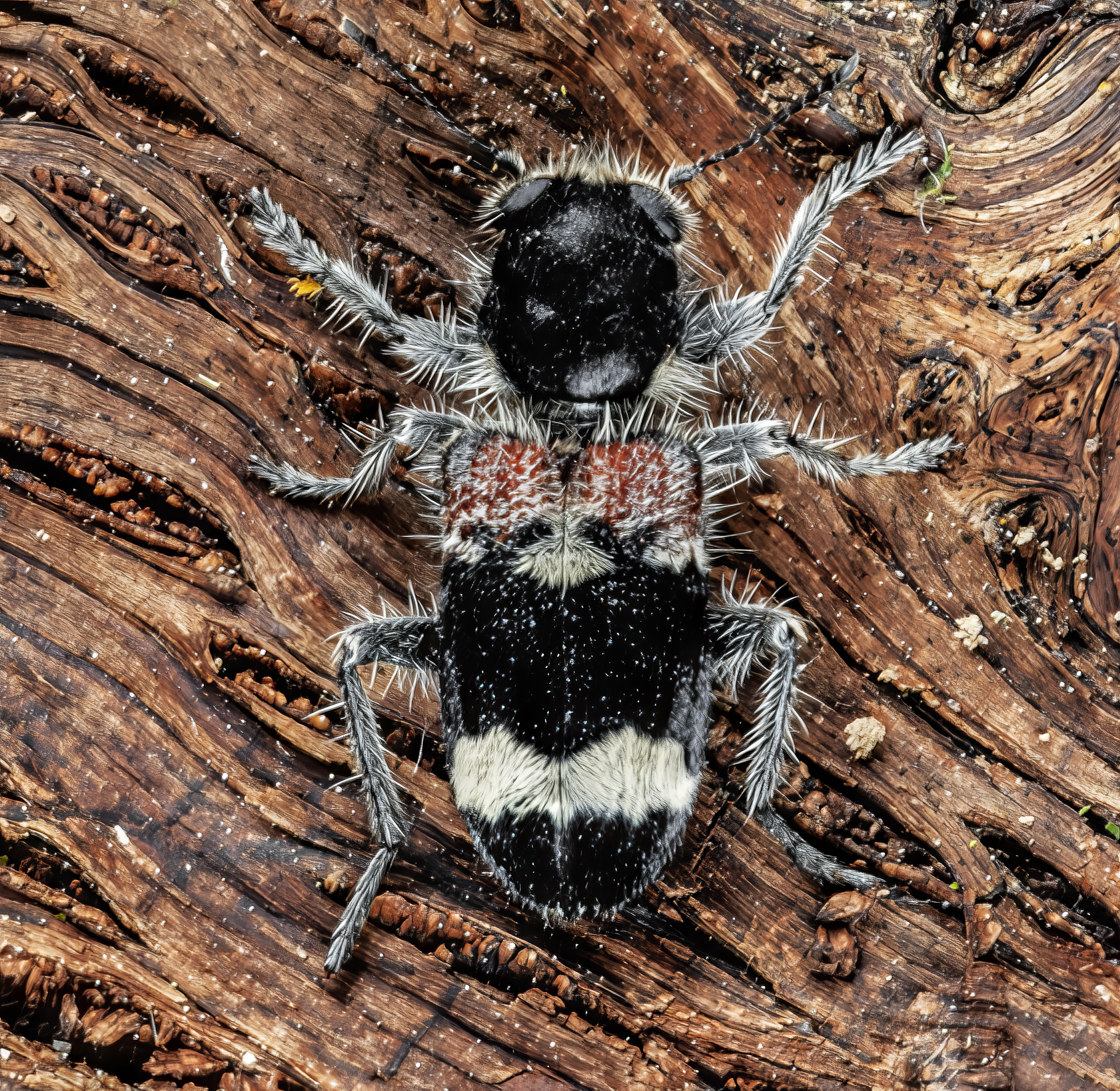
- Clerus mutillarius Fabricius, 1775

Scientific classification
- Kingdom: Animalia
- Phylum: Arthropoda
- Class: Insecta
- Order: Coleoptera
- Suborder: Polyphaga
- Infraorder: Cucujiformia
- Family: Cleridae
- Subfamily: Clerinae
- Genus: Clerus; Fabricius, 1775; According to ICZN Opinion 1273, Opinion 228 was superseded, giving correct authorship of Clerus to Geoffroy, 1762.

Species
- See text

Synonyms
- Beudoclerops Pic, 1950; Cleronus Rafinesque, 1815; Pseudoclerops Jacquelin du Val, 1861; Stigmamatium Klug, 1842

= Clerus =

Genus of beetles

Clerus is a genus of beetles in the subfamily Clerinae.

== Species ==
Clerus africanus - Clerus dealbatus - Clerus formosanus - Clerus guishanensis - Clerus intermedius - Clerus klapperichi - Clerus mutillaeformis - Clerus mutillarius - Clerus mutillaroides - Clerus sinae - Clerus thanasimoides
