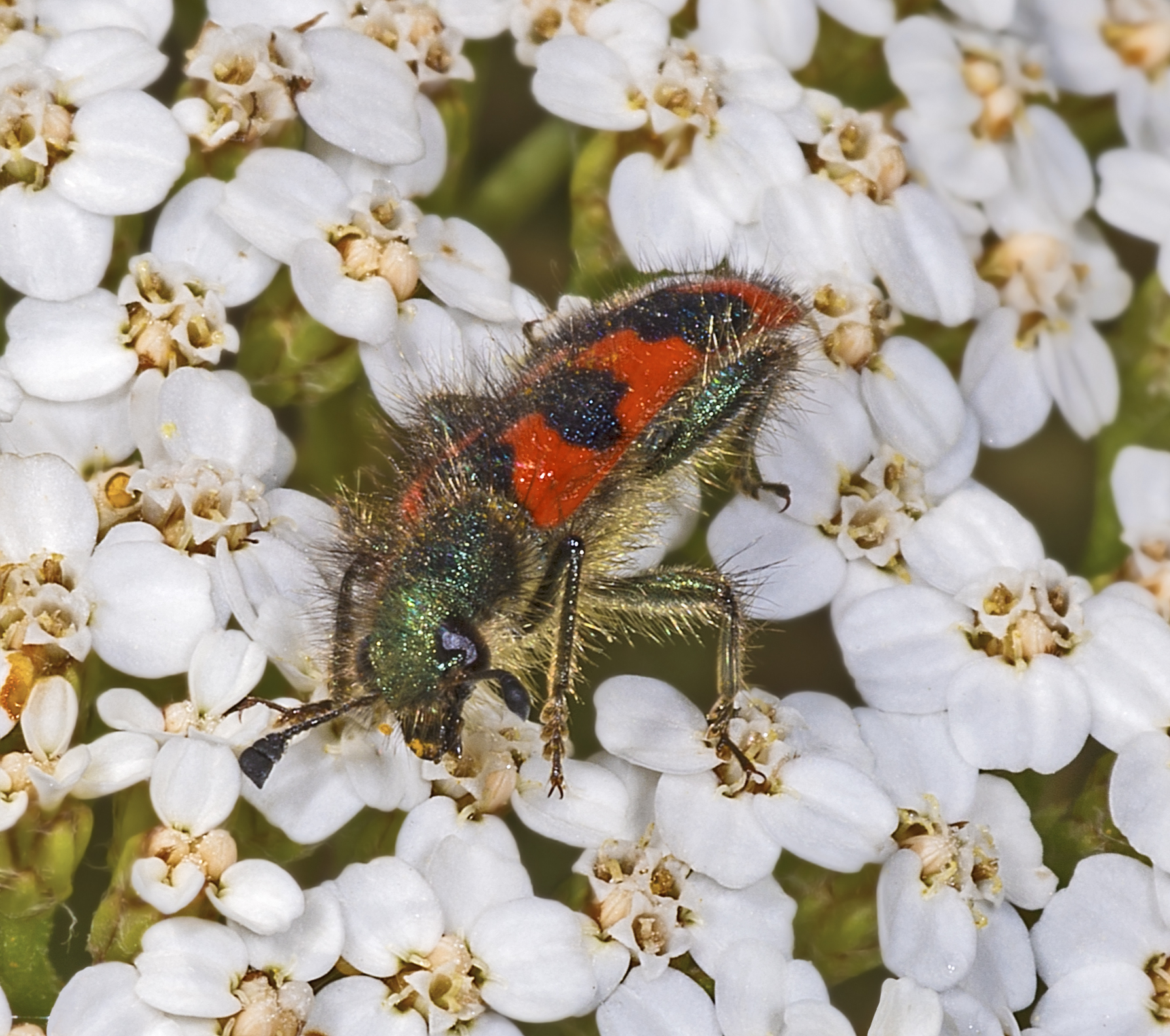

Scientific classification
- Kingdom: Animalia
- Phylum: Arthropoda
- Class: Insecta
- Order: Coleoptera
- Suborder: Polyphaga
- Infraorder: Cucujiformia
- Family: Cleridae
- Subfamily: Clerinae; Latreille, 1802

Genera
- See text

= Clerinae =

Subfamily of beetles

Clerinae is a subfamily of beetles in the family Cleridae.

== Genera ==
- Allonyx
- Aphelocerus
- Aphelochroa
- Aulicus
- Balcus
- Calendyma
- Caridopus
- Clerus
- Colyphus
- Corynommadius
- Dologenitus
- Dozocolletus
- Enoclerus
- Epiclines
- Erymanthus
- Evenoclerus
- Gyponyx
- Jenjouristia
- Kanaliella
- Languropilus
- Menieroclerus
- Neorthrius
- Nonalatus
- Ohanlonella
- Omadius
- Opilo
- Orthrius
- Perilypus
- Phloiocopus
- Pieleus
- Placopterus
- Priocera
- Pseudoastigmus
- Sedlacekvia
- Stigmatium
- Thanasimodes
- Thanasimus
- Tillicera
- Trichodes
- Wilsonoclerus
- Xenorthrius
- Zenithicola
- †Arawakis
