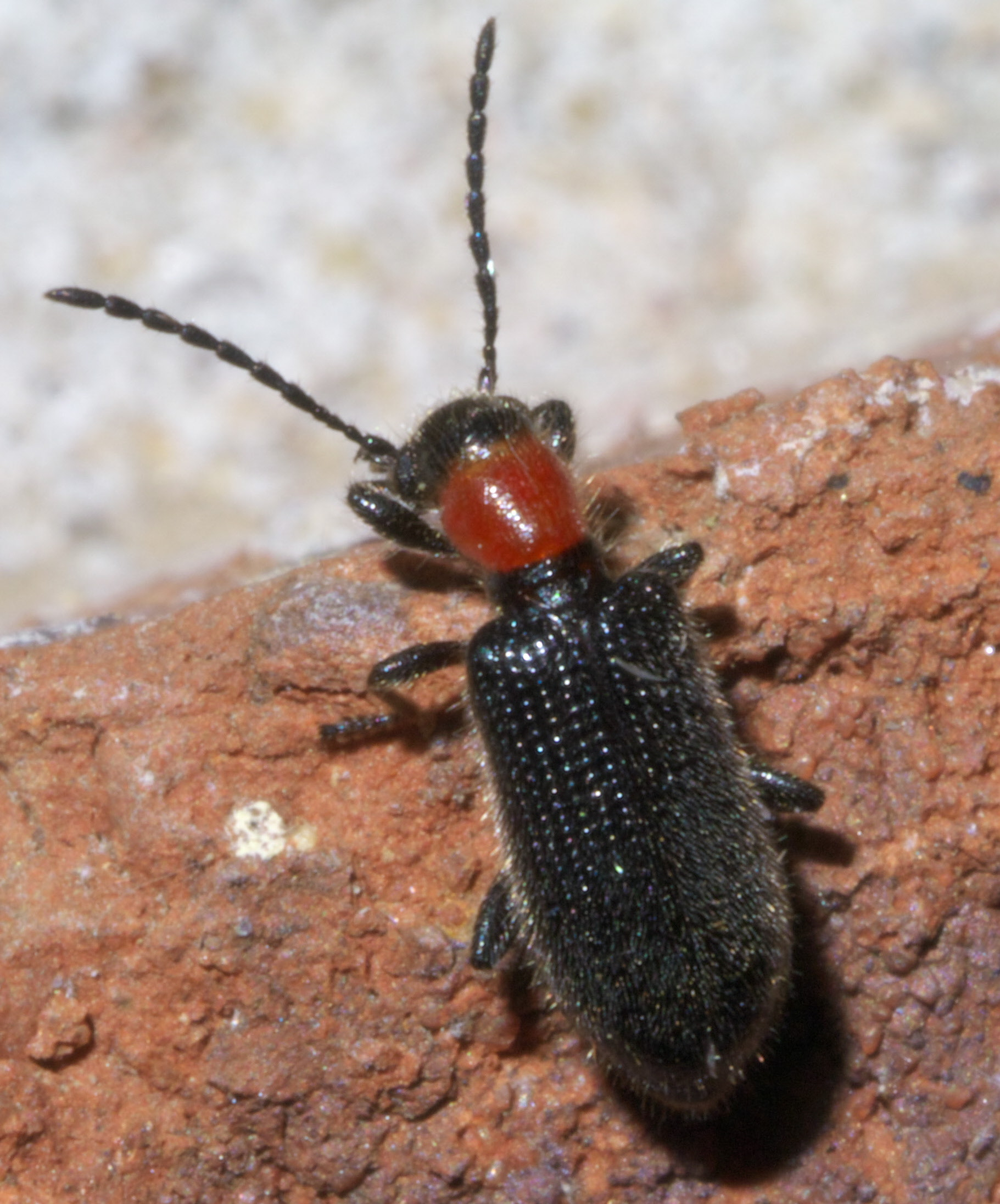

Scientific classification
- Domain: Eukaryota
- Kingdom: Animalia
- Phylum: Arthropoda
- Class: Insecta
- Order: Coleoptera
- Suborder: Polyphaga
- Infraorder: Cucujiformia
- Family: Cleridae
- Genus: Cymatoderella
- Species: C. collaris

Binomial name
- Cymatoderella collaris (Spinola, 1844)

Synonyms
- Tillus collaris Spinola, 1844

= Cymatoderella collaris =

Species of beetle

Cymatoderella collaris is a species of checkered beetle in the family Cleridae. It is found in Central America and North America.

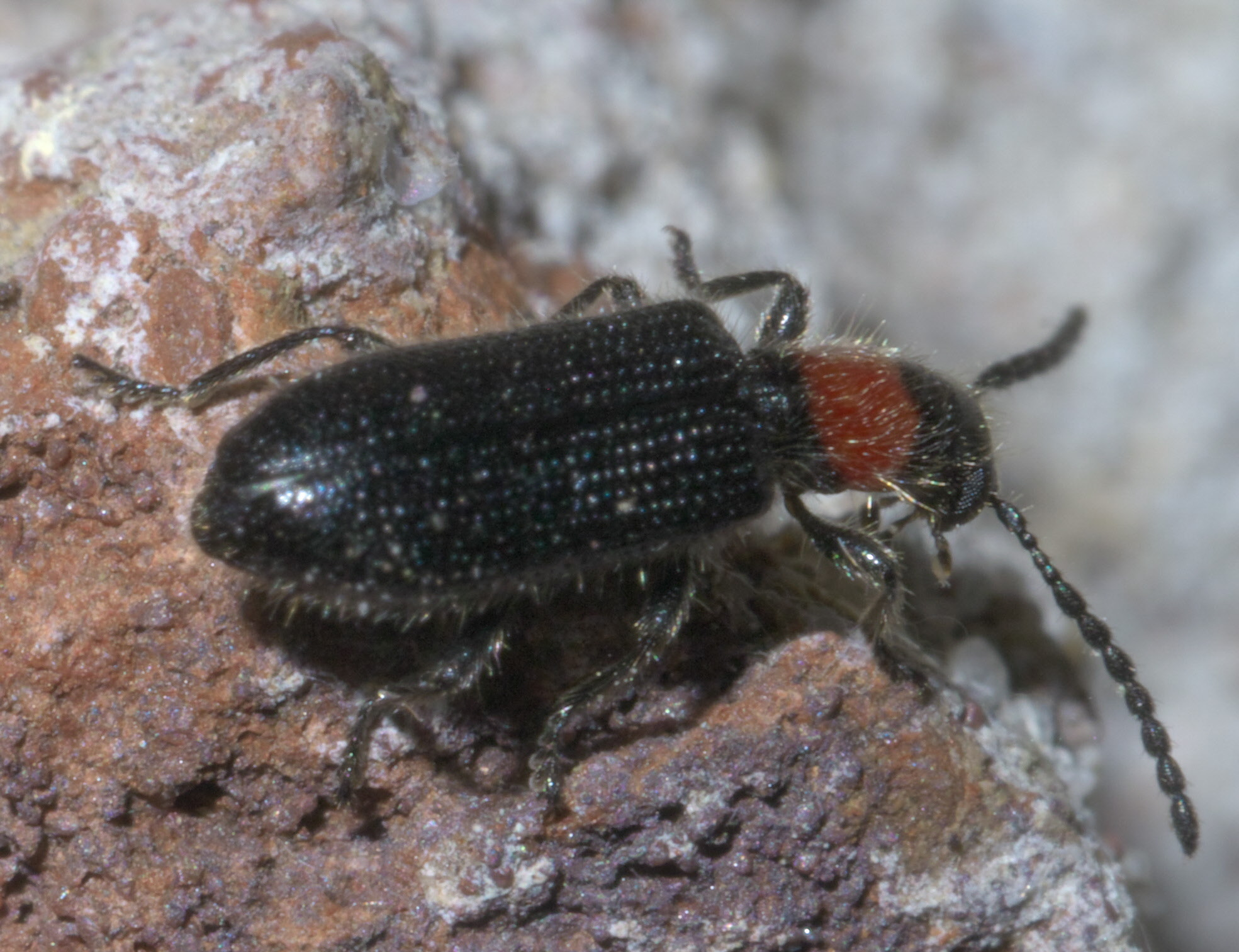

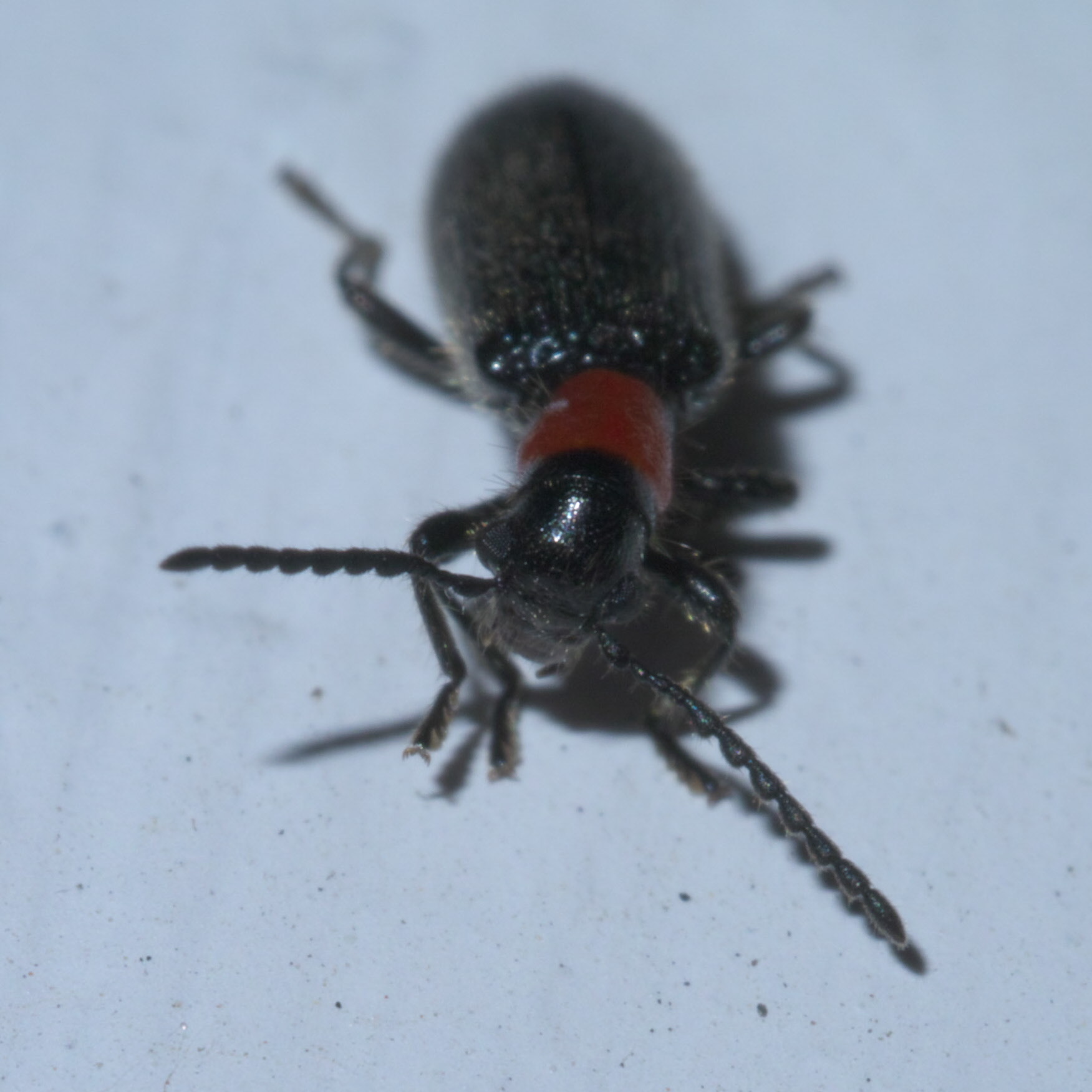
