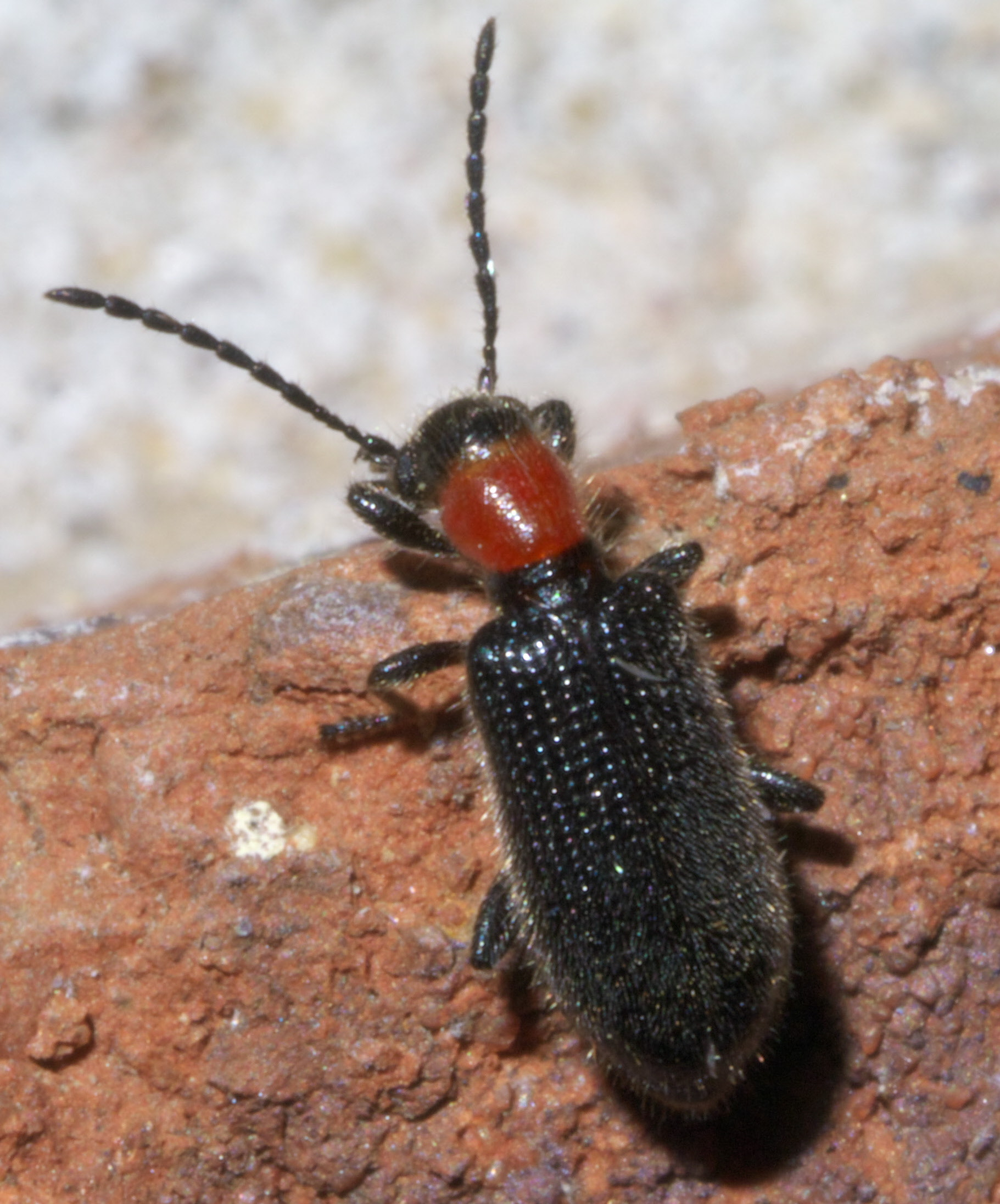
- Cymatoderella collaris

Scientific classification
- Domain: Eukaryota
- Kingdom: Animalia
- Phylum: Arthropoda
- Class: Insecta
- Order: Coleoptera
- Suborder: Polyphaga
- Infraorder: Cucujiformia
- Family: Cleridae
- Subfamily: Tillinae
- Genus: Cymatoderella; Barr, 1962

= Cymatoderella =

Genus of beetles

Cymatoderella is a genus of checkered beetles in the family Cleridae. There are at least three described species in Cymatoderella.

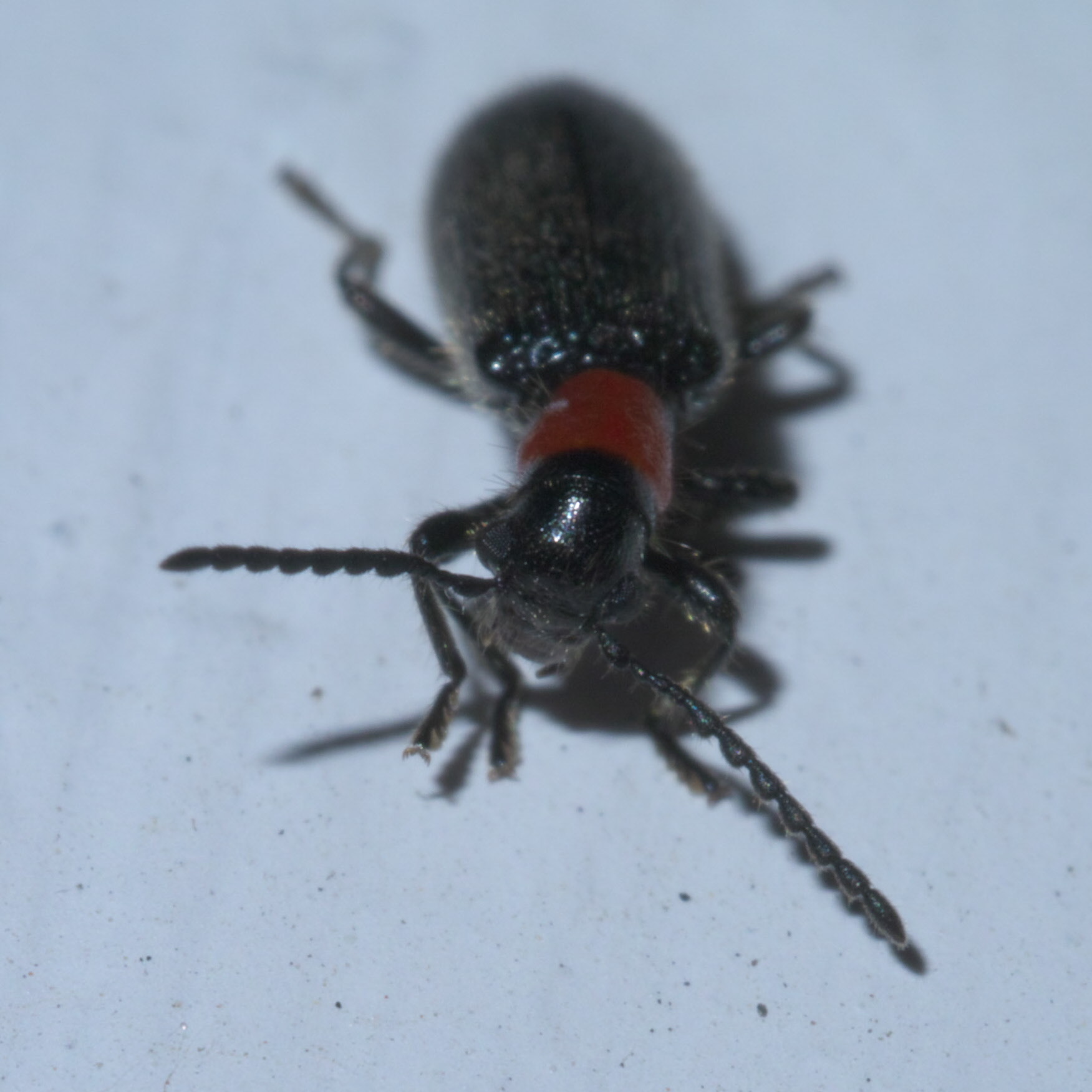
Cymatoderella collaris

== Species ==
These three species belong to the genus Cymatoderella:

- Cymatoderella collaris (Spinola, 1844)
- Cymatoderella morula Rifkind, 1993
- Cymatoderella patagoniae (Knull, 1946)
