= Isohydnocera albocincta =

Scientific classification
- Domain: Eukaryota
- Kingdom: Animalia
- Phylum: Arthropoda
- Class: Insecta
- Order: Coleoptera
- Suborder: Polyphaga
- Infraorder: Cucujiformia
- Family: Cleridae
- Genus: Isohydnocera
- Species: I. albocincta

Binomial name
- Isohydnocera albocincta (Horn, 1871)

Species of beetle

Isohydnocera albocincta is a species of checkered beetle in the family Cleridae. It is found in North America.
