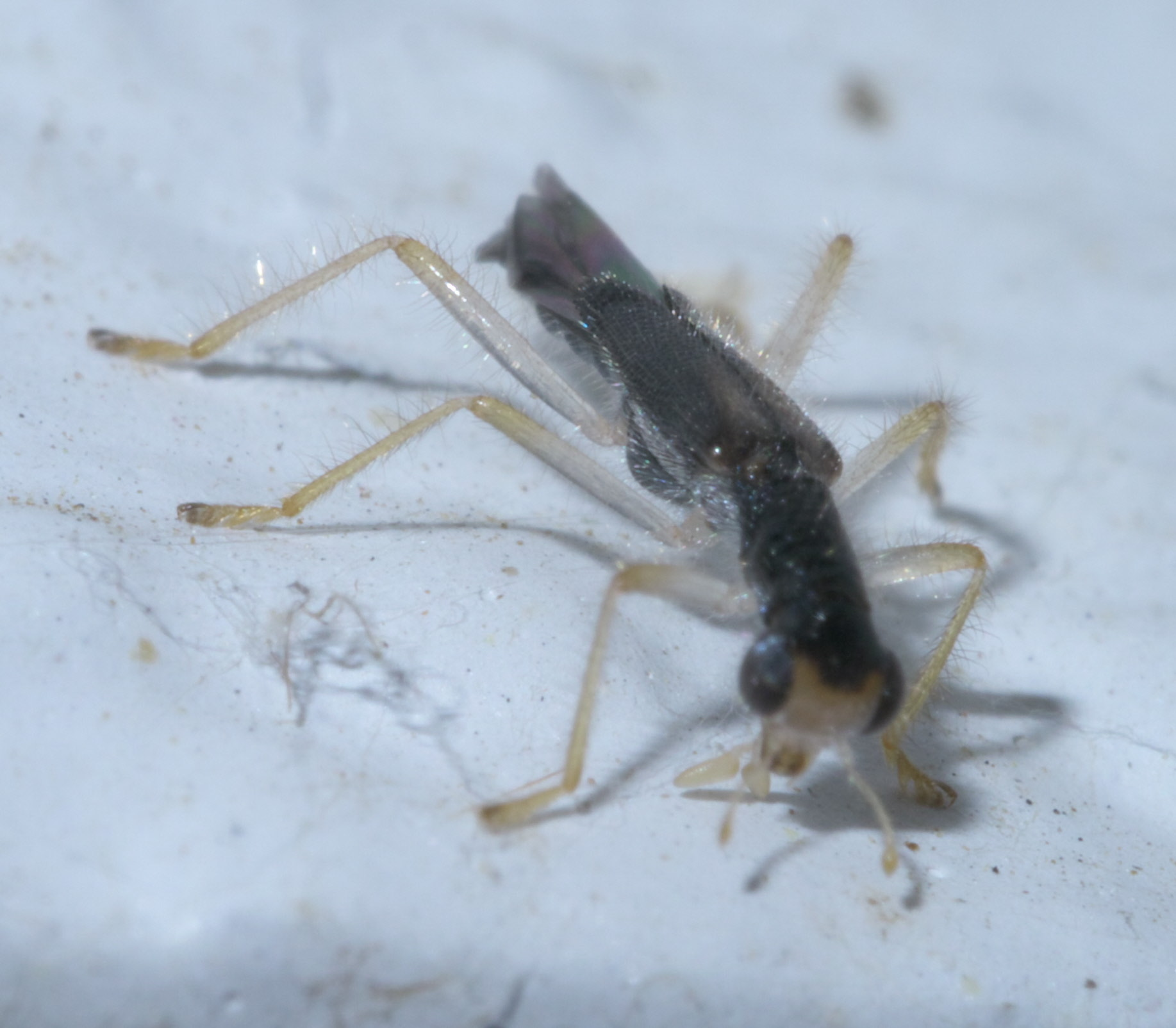
- Isohydnocera curtipennis

Scientific classification
- Domain: Eukaryota
- Kingdom: Animalia
- Phylum: Arthropoda
- Class: Insecta
- Order: Coleoptera
- Suborder: Polyphaga
- Infraorder: Cucujiformia
- Family: Cleridae
- Subfamily: Hydnocerinae
- Genus: Isohydnocera

= Isohydnocera =

Genus of beetles

Isohydnocera is a genus of checkered beetles in the family Cleridae. There are about 14 described species in Isohydnocera.

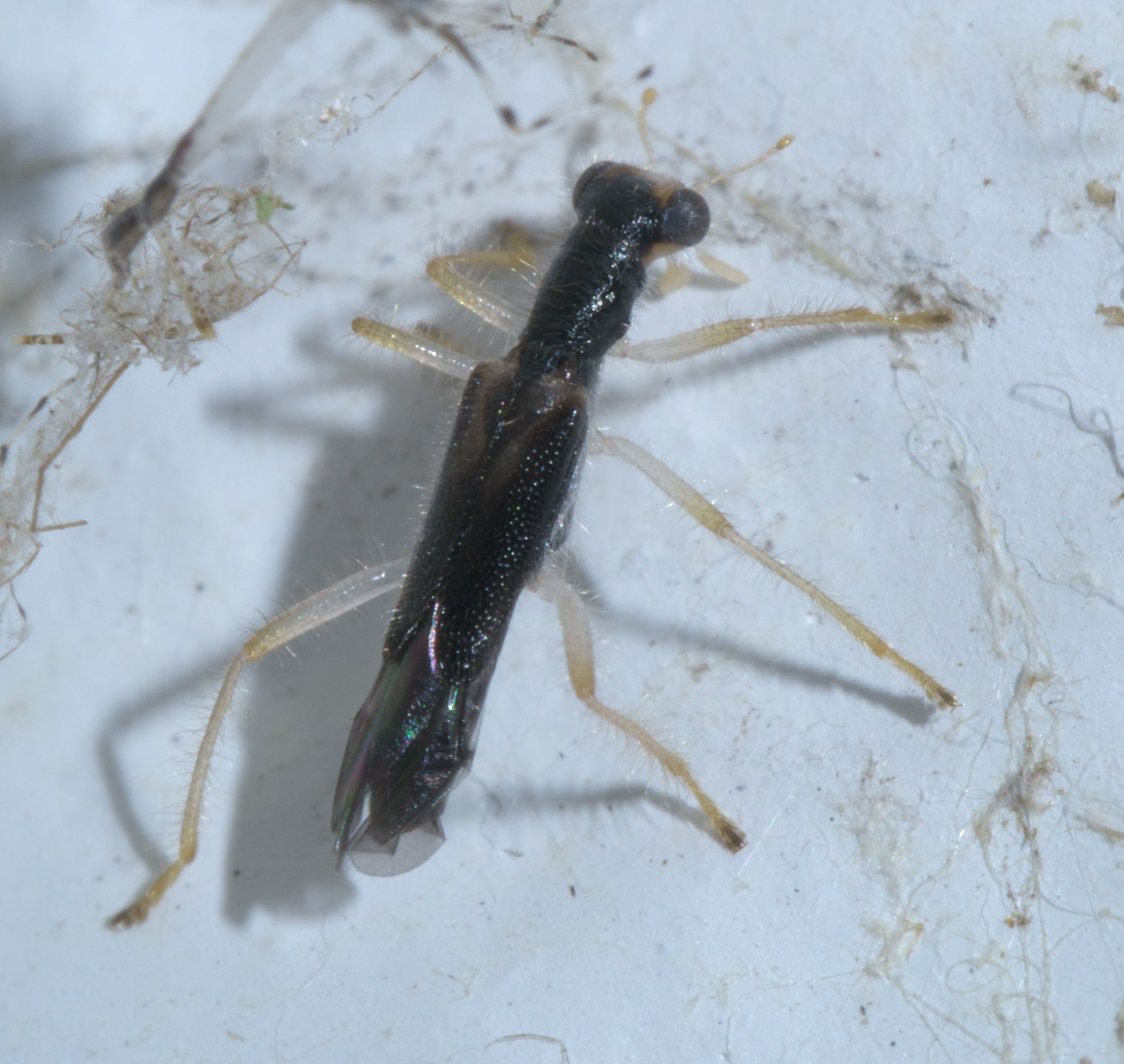
Isohydnocera curtipennis

== Species ==
- Isohydnocera aegra (Newman, 1840)
- Isohydnocera albocincta (Horn, 1871)
- Isohydnocera brunnea Chapin, 1917
- Isohydnocera chiricahuana Knull, 1949
- Isohydnocera curtipennis (Newman, 1840)
- Isohydnocera gerhardi (Wolcott, 1910)
- Isohydnocera liebecki Wolcott, 1928
- Isohydnocera mima Wolcott, 1928
- Isohydnocera nigrina (Schaeffer, 1908)
- Isohydnocera ornata (Wolcott, 1908)
- Isohydnocera pusilla (Schaeffer, 1909)
- Isohydnocera schusteri (LeConte, 1866)
- Isohydnocera tabida (Leconte, 1849)
- Isohydnocera tricondylae (LeConte, 1849)
