= Isohydnocera tabida =

Scientific classification
- Domain: Eukaryota
- Kingdom: Animalia
- Phylum: Arthropoda
- Class: Insecta
- Order: Coleoptera
- Suborder: Polyphaga
- Infraorder: Cucujiformia
- Family: Cleridae
- Genus: Isohydnocera
- Species: I. tabida

Binomial name
- Isohydnocera tabida (Leconte, 1849)

Species of beetle

Isohydnocera tabida is a species of checkered beetle in the family Cleridae. It is found in North America.
