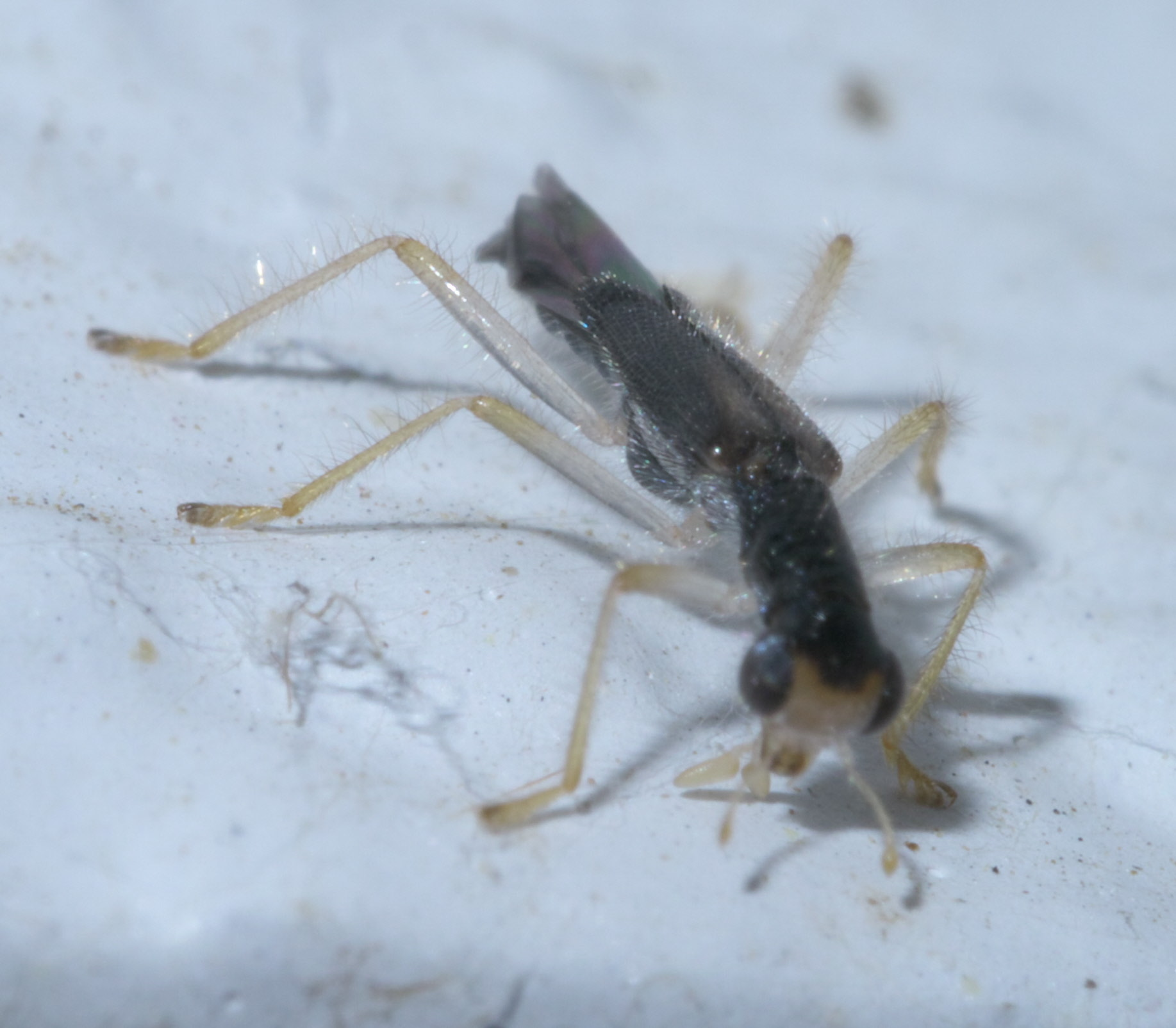

Scientific classification
- Domain: Eukaryota
- Kingdom: Animalia
- Phylum: Arthropoda
- Class: Insecta
- Order: Coleoptera
- Suborder: Polyphaga
- Infraorder: Cucujiformia
- Family: Cleridae
- Genus: Isohydnocera
- Species: I. curtipennis

Binomial name
- Isohydnocera curtipennis (Newman, 1840)

= Isohydnocera curtipennis =

Species of beetle

Isohydnocera curtipennis is a species of checkered beetle in the family Cleridae. It is found in North America.

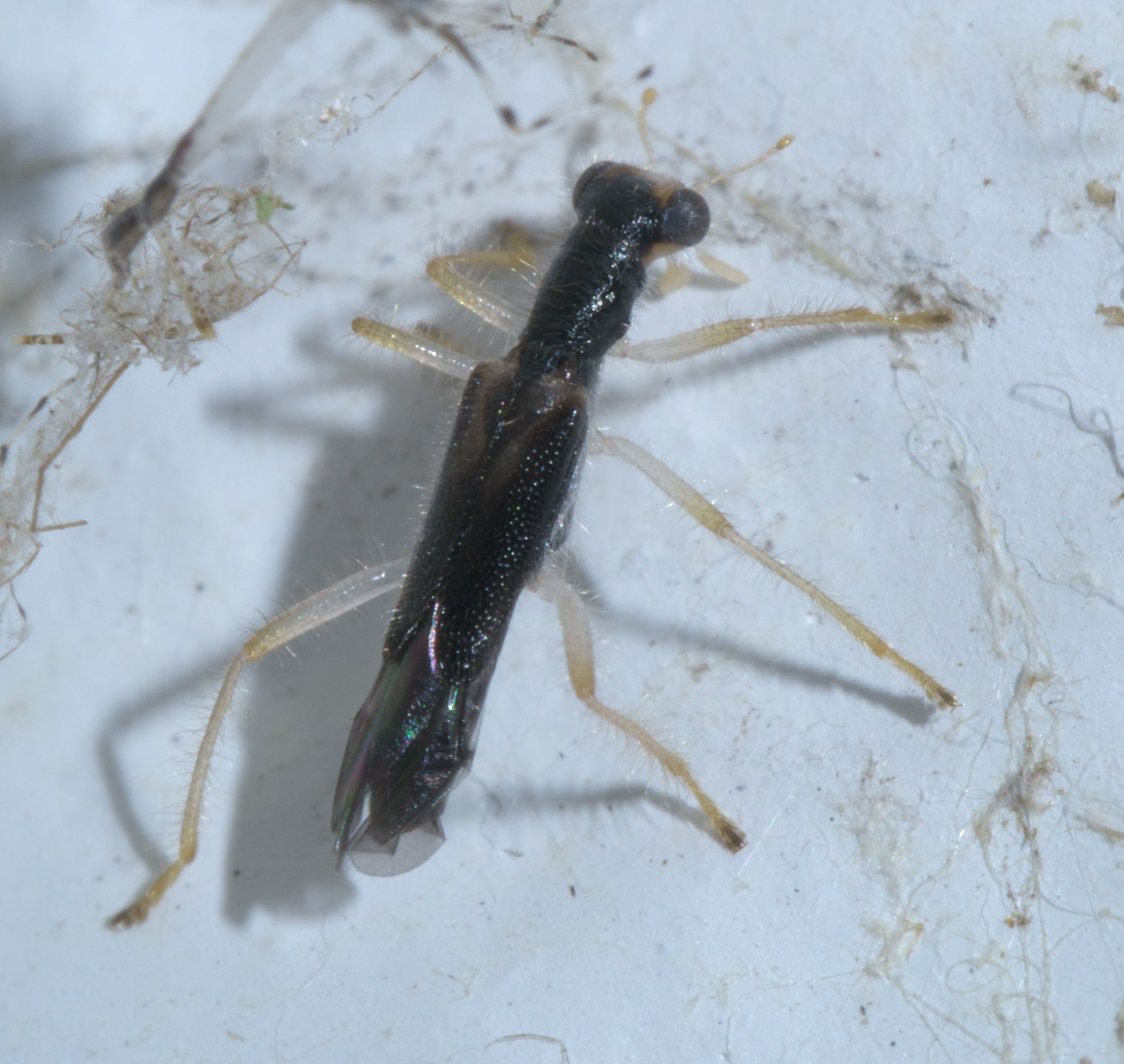
