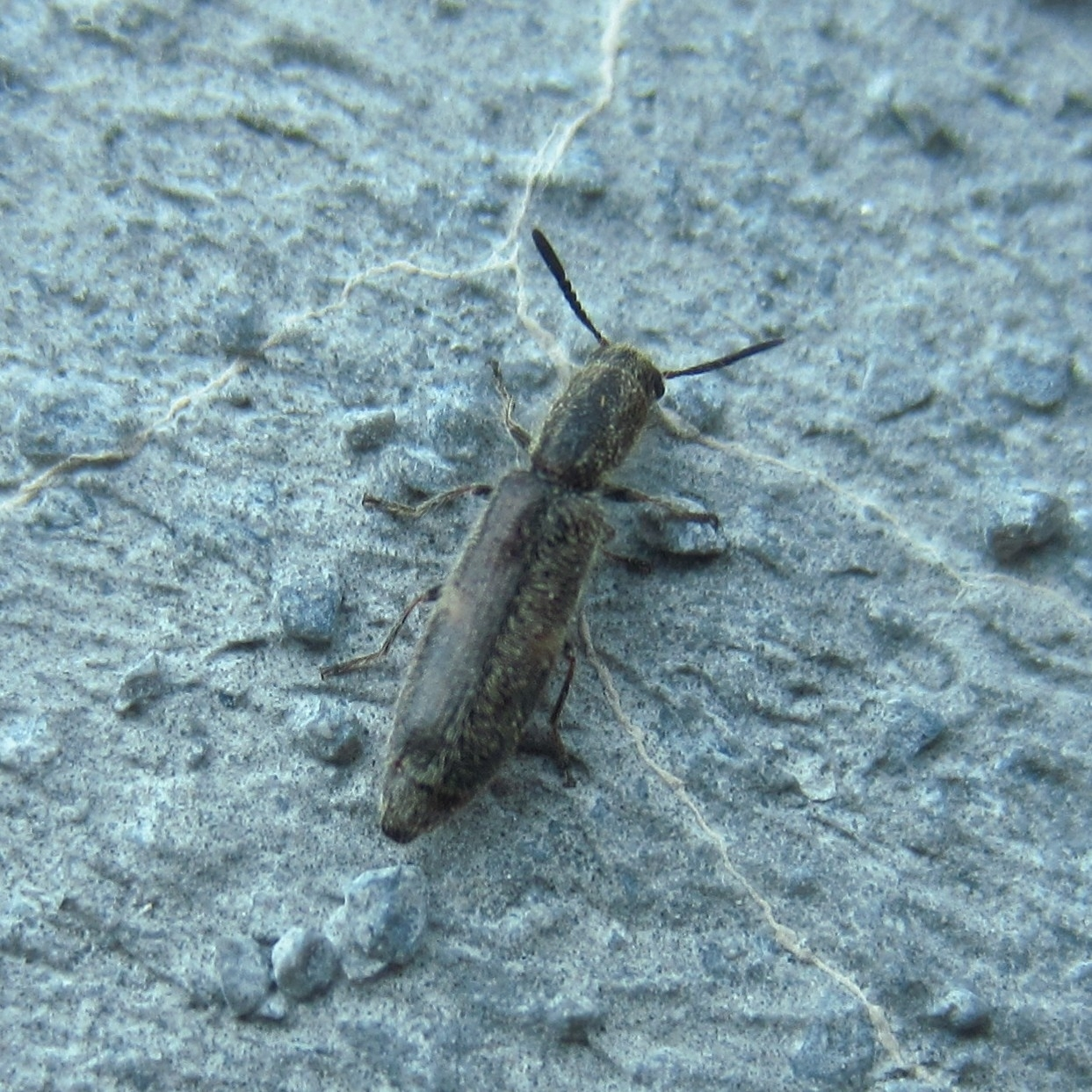

Scientific classification
- Kingdom: Animalia
- Phylum: Arthropoda
- Clade: Pancrustacea
- Class: Insecta
- Order: Coleoptera
- Suborder: Polyphaga
- Infraorder: Cucujiformia
- Family: Cleridae
- Genus: Monophylla
- Species: M. pallipes

Binomial name
- Monophylla pallipes Schaeffer, 1908

= Monophylla pallipes =

Species of beetle

Monophylla pallipes is a species of checkered beetle in the family Cleridae. It is found in Central America and North America.
