= Monophylla californica =

Scientific classification
- Domain: Eukaryota
- Kingdom: Animalia
- Phylum: Arthropoda
- Class: Insecta
- Order: Coleoptera
- Suborder: Polyphaga
- Infraorder: Cucujiformia
- Family: Cleridae
- Genus: Monophylla
- Species: M. californica

Binomial name
- Monophylla californica (Fall, 1901)

Synonyms
- Monophylla substriata Wolcott, 1910

Species of beetle

Monophylla californica is a species of checkered beetle in the family Cleridae. It is found in Central America and North America.
