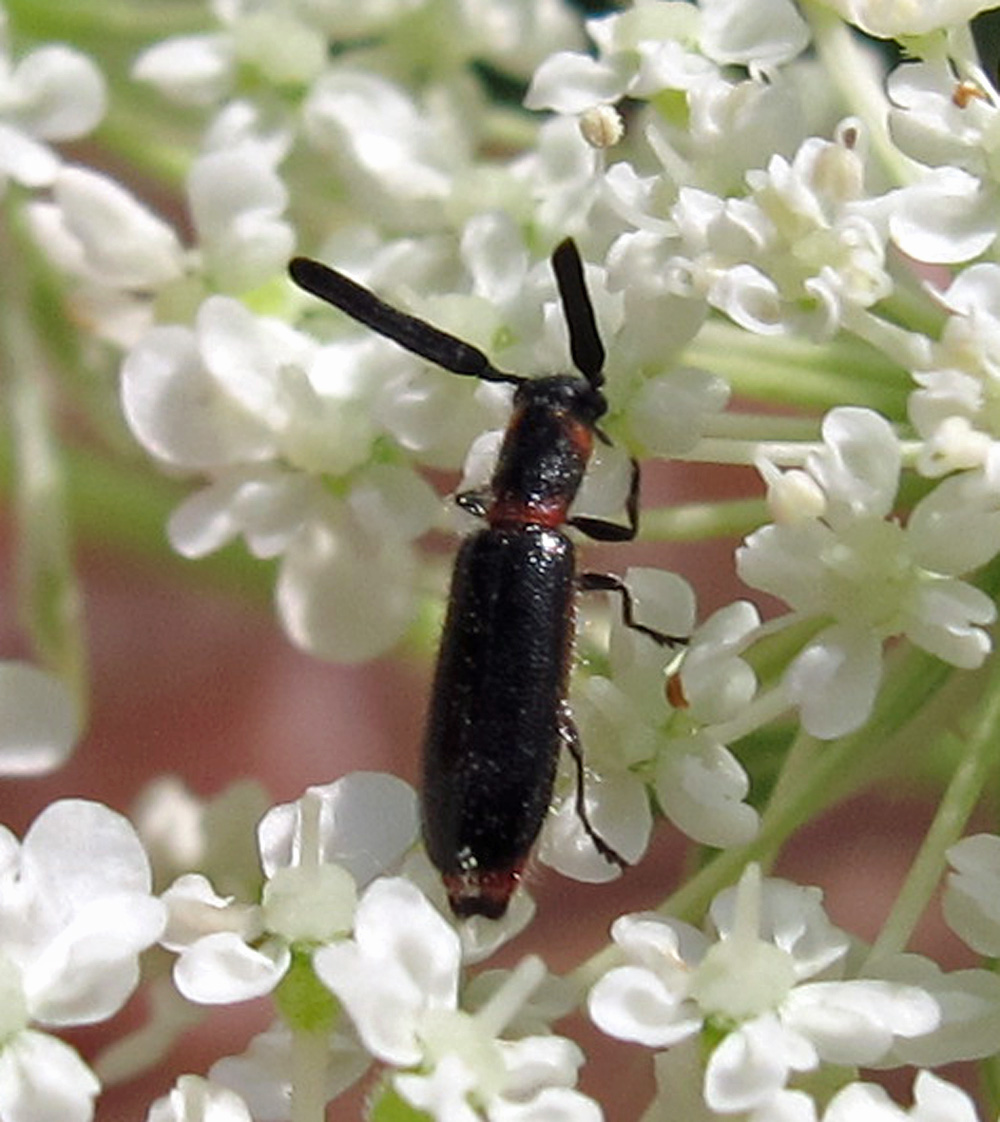
- Monophylla terminata

Scientific classification
- Kingdom: Animalia
- Phylum: Arthropoda
- Clade: Pancrustacea
- Class: Insecta
- Order: Coleoptera
- Suborder: Polyphaga
- Infraorder: Cucujiformia
- Family: Cleridae
- Subfamily: Tillinae
- Genus: Monophylla; Spinola, 1841

= Monophylla =

Genus of beetles

Monophylla is a genus of checkered beetles in the family Cleridae. There are at least four described species in Monophylla.

== Species ==
These four species belong to the genus Monophylla:

- Monophylla californica (Fall, 1901)
- Monophylla cinctipennis Chevrolat, 1874
- Monophylla pallipes Schaeffer, 1908
- Monophylla terminata (Say, 1835)
