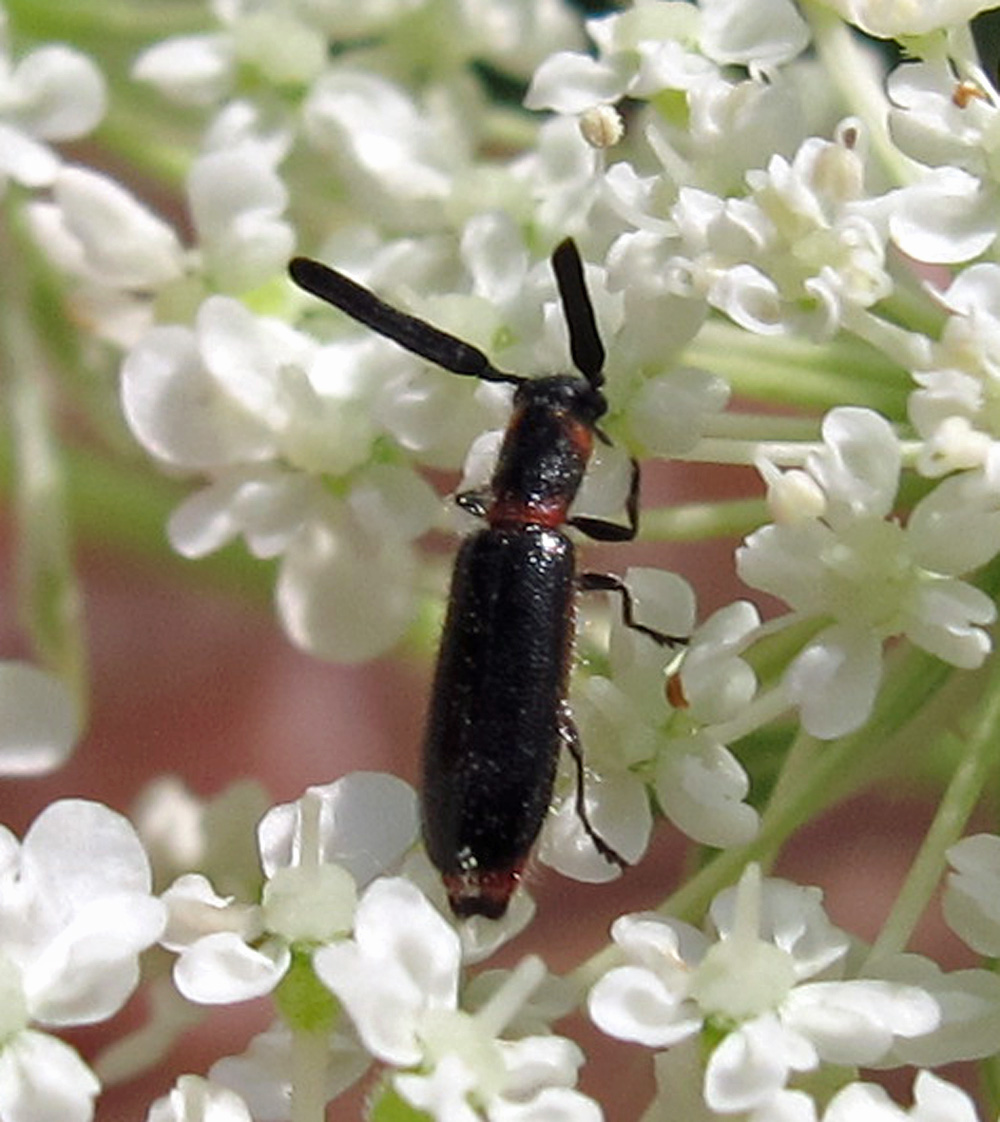

Scientific classification
- Domain: Eukaryota
- Kingdom: Animalia
- Phylum: Arthropoda
- Class: Insecta
- Order: Coleoptera
- Suborder: Polyphaga
- Infraorder: Cucujiformia
- Family: Cleridae
- Genus: Monophylla
- Species: M. terminata

Binomial name
- Monophylla terminata (Say, 1835)

Synonyms
- Monophylla ruficollis Schaeffer, 1911

= Monophylla terminata =

Species of beetle

Monophylla terminata is a species of checkered beetle in the family Cleridae. It is found in Australia, Europe and Northern Asia (excluding China), Central America, and North America.
