= Pennasolis =

Scientific classification
- Domain: Eukaryota
- Kingdom: Animalia
- Phylum: Arthropoda
- Class: Insecta
- Order: Coleoptera
- Suborder: Polyphaga
- Infraorder: Cucujiformia
- Family: Cleridae
- Subfamily: Epiphloeinae
- Genus: Pennasolis; Opits, 2008

Genus of beetles

Pennasolis is a genus of checkered beetles in the family Cleridae. There are at least three described species in Pennasolis.

== Species ==
These three species belong to the genus Pennasolis:

- Pennasolis californica (Van Dyke, 1923)
- Pennasolis merkeli (Horn, 1896)
- Pennasolis opitzi Rifkind, Toledo & Corona, 2010
