= Epiphloeinae =

Scientific classification
- Domain: Eukaryota
- Kingdom: Animalia
- Phylum: Arthropoda
- Class: Insecta
- Order: Coleoptera
- Suborder: Polyphaga
- Infraorder: Cucujiformia
- Family: Cleridae
- Subfamily: Epiphloeinae; Kuwert, 1893

Subfamily of beetles

Epiphloeinae is a subfamily of checkered beetles in the family Cleridae. There are about 5 genera and at least 30 described species in Epiphloeinae.

== Genera ==
These five genera belong to the subfamily Epiphloeinae:

- Corinthiscus Fairmaire & Germain, 1861
- Ichnea Laporte, 1836
- Madoniella Pic, 1935
- Pennasolis Opits, 2008
- Pyticeroides Kuwert, 1894
