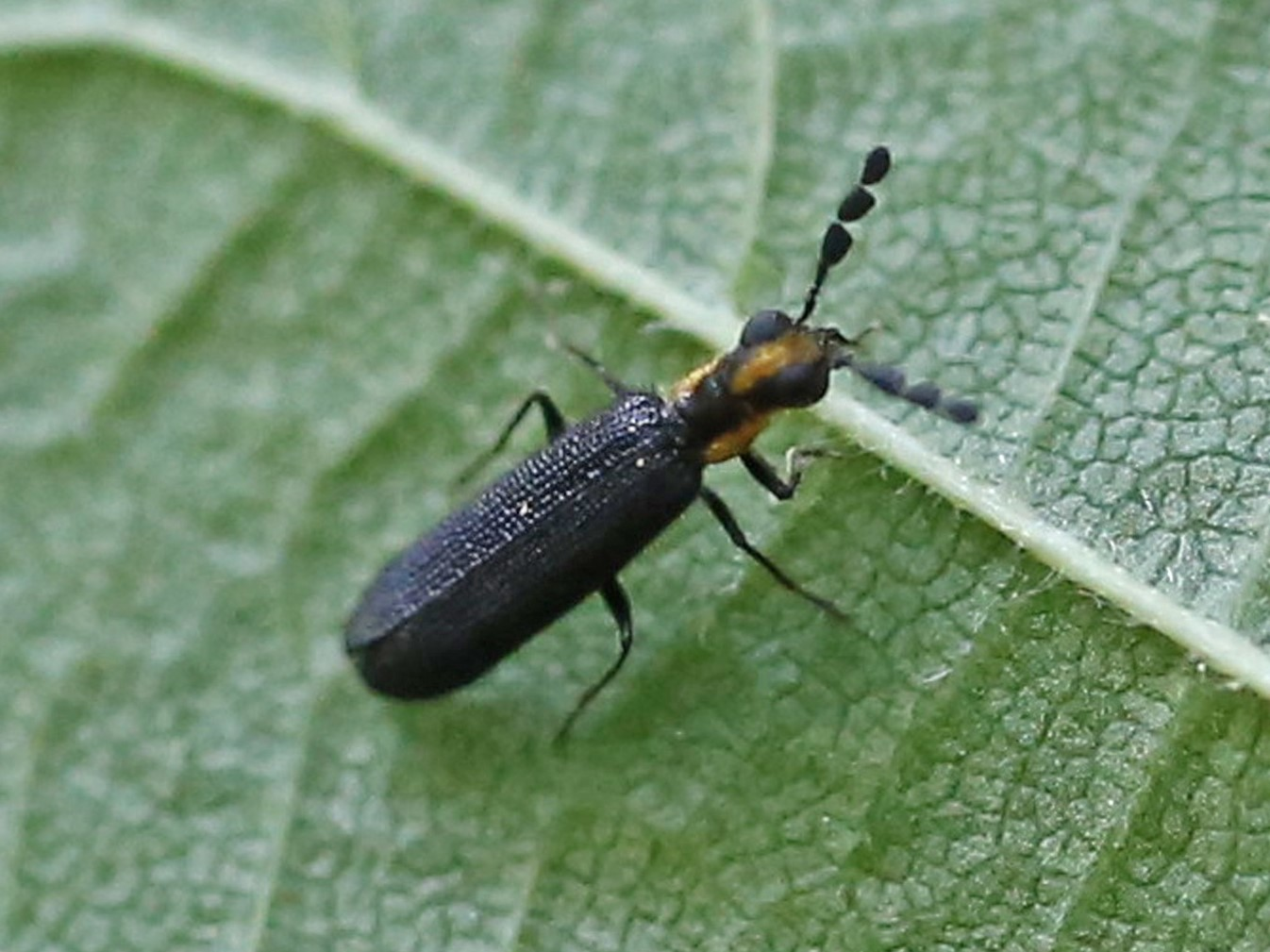

Scientific classification
- Domain: Eukaryota
- Kingdom: Animalia
- Phylum: Arthropoda
- Class: Insecta
- Order: Coleoptera
- Suborder: Polyphaga
- Infraorder: Cucujiformia
- Family: Cleridae
- Genus: Pyticeroides
- Species: P. laticornis

Binomial name
- Pyticeroides laticornis (Say, 1835)

= Pyticeroides laticornis =

Species of beetle

Pyticeroides laticornis, the broad-horned clerid, is a species of checkered beetle in the family Cleridae. It is found in North America.
