= Madoniella =

Scientific classification
- Kingdom: Animalia
- Phylum: Arthropoda
- Class: Insecta
- Order: Coleoptera
- Suborder: Polyphaga
- Infraorder: Cucujiformia
- Family: Cleridae
- Subfamily: Epiphloeinae
- Genus: Madoniella; Pic, 1935

Genus of beetles

Madoniella is a genus of checkered beetles in the family Cleridae. There are about 11 described species in Madoniella.

== Species ==
These 11 species belong to the genus Madoniella:

- Madoniella aktis Opitz, 2010
- Madoniella californica (Van Dyke, 1923)
- Madoniella caporaali Pic, 1935
- Madoniella chiricahua
- Madoniella cracentis Opitz, 2011
- Madoniella crinis
- Madoniella dislocata (Say, 1825)
- Madoniella merkeli (Horn, 1896)
- Madoniella minor Pic, 1935
- Madoniella pici Lepesme, 1947
- Madoniella rectangularis
