= Pyticeroides =

Scientific classification
- Kingdom: Animalia
- Phylum: Arthropoda
- Class: Insecta
- Order: Coleoptera
- Suborder: Polyphaga
- Infraorder: Cucujiformia
- Family: Cleridae
- Subfamily: Epiphloeinae
- Genus: Pyticeroides; Kuwert, 1894

Genus of beetles

Pyticeroides is a genus of checkered beetles in the family Cleridae. There are about nine described species in Pyticeroides.

== Species ==
These nine species belong to the genus Pyticeroides:

- Pyticeroides decurialis Opitz, 2007
- Pyticeroides eurides Opitz, 2007
- Pyticeroides fustis Opitz, 2007
- Pyticeroides iscus Opitz, 2007
- Pyticeroides laticornis (Say, 1835) (broad-horned clerid)
- Pyticeroides manni Chapin, 1927
- Pyticeroides moraguesi Opitz, 2010
- Pyticeroides pullis Opitz, 2010
- Pyticeroides similis Opitz, 2007
