= Ichnea =

Scientific classification
- Domain: Eukaryota
- Kingdom: Animalia
- Phylum: Arthropoda
- Class: Insecta
- Order: Coleoptera
- Suborder: Polyphaga
- Infraorder: Cucujiformia
- Family: Cleridae
- Subfamily: Epiphloeinae
- Genus: Ichnea; Laporte, 1836

Genus of beetles

Ichnea is a genus of checkered beetles in the family Cleridae. There are at least four described species in Ichnea.

== Species ==
These four species belong to the genus Ichnea:

- Ichnea digna Wolcott
- Ichnea elongata Knull, 1939
- Ichnea marginella (Klug, 1842)
- Ichnea opaca (Klug, 1842)
