= Madoniella dislocata =

Scientific classification
- Domain: Eukaryota
- Kingdom: Animalia
- Phylum: Arthropoda
- Class: Insecta
- Order: Coleoptera
- Suborder: Polyphaga
- Infraorder: Cucujiformia
- Family: Cleridae
- Genus: Madoniella
- Species: M. dislocata

Binomial name
- Madoniella dislocata (Say, 1825)

Species of beetle

Madoniella dislocata is a species of checkered beetle in the family Cleridae. It is found in North America.
