= Pennasolis merkeli =

Scientific classification
- Domain: Eukaryota
- Kingdom: Animalia
- Phylum: Arthropoda
- Class: Insecta
- Order: Coleoptera
- Suborder: Polyphaga
- Infraorder: Cucujiformia
- Family: Cleridae
- Genus: Pennasolis
- Species: P. merkeli

Binomial name
- Pennasolis merkeli (Horn, 1896)

Synonyms
- Phyllobaenus merkeli Horn, 1896

Species of beetle

Pennasolis merkeli is a species of checkered beetle in the family Cleridae. It is found in North America.
