= Loedelia =

Scientific classification
- Domain: Eukaryota
- Kingdom: Animalia
- Phylum: Arthropoda
- Class: Insecta
- Order: Coleoptera
- Suborder: Polyphaga
- Infraorder: Cucujiformia
- Family: Cleridae
- Genus: Loedelia; Lucas, 1920

Genus of beetles

Loedelia is a genus of checkered beetles in the family Cleridae. There are at least three described species in Loedelia.

== Species ==
These three species belong to the genus Loedelia:

- Loedelia discoidea (LeConte, 1881)
- Loedelia janthina (LeConte, 1866)
- Loedelia maculicollis (LeConte, 1874)
