= Loedelia discoidea =

Scientific classification
- Kingdom: Animalia
- Phylum: Arthropoda
- Class: Insecta
- Order: Coleoptera
- Suborder: Polyphaga
- Infraorder: Cucujiformia
- Family: Cleridae
- Genus: Loedelia
- Species: L. discoidea

Binomial name
- Loedelia discoidea (LeConte, 1881)

Species of beetle

Loedelia discoidea is a species of checkered beetle in the family Cleridae. It is found in North America.
