= Loedelia maculicollis =

Scientific classification
- Kingdom: Animalia
- Phylum: Arthropoda
- Class: Insecta
- Order: Coleoptera
- Suborder: Polyphaga
- Infraorder: Cucujiformia
- Family: Cleridae
- Genus: Loedelia
- Species: L. maculicollis

Binomial name
- Loedelia maculicollis (LeConte, 1874)

Species of beetle

Loedelia maculicollis is a species of checkered beetle in the family Cleridae. It is found in Central America and North America.
