= Araeodontia isabellae =

Scientific classification
- Domain: Eukaryota
- Kingdom: Animalia
- Phylum: Arthropoda
- Class: Insecta
- Order: Coleoptera
- Suborder: Polyphaga
- Infraorder: Cucujiformia
- Family: Cleridae
- Genus: Araeodontia
- Species: A. isabellae

Binomial name
- Araeodontia isabellae (Wolcott, 1910)

Synonyms
- Cymatodera isabellae Wolcott, 1910

Species of beetle

Araeodontia isabellae is a species of checkered beetle in the family Cleridae. It is found in Central America and North America.
