= Araeodontia =

Scientific classification
- Domain: Eukaryota
- Kingdom: Animalia
- Phylum: Arthropoda
- Class: Insecta
- Order: Coleoptera
- Suborder: Polyphaga
- Infraorder: Cucujiformia
- Family: Cleridae
- Subfamily: Tillinae
- Genus: Araeodontia; Barr, 1952

Genus of beetles

Araeodontia is a genus of checkered beetles in the family Cleridae. There are about five described species in Araeodontia.

== Species ==
These five species belong to the genus Araeodontia:

- Araeodontia isabellae (Wolcott, 1910)
- Araeodontia marginalis Barr, 1952
- Araeodontia peninsularis (Schaeffer, 1904)
- Araeodontia picipennis (Barr, 1950)
- Araeodontia picta Barr, 1952
