= Wolcottia pedalis =

Scientific classification
- Domain: Eukaryota
- Kingdom: Animalia
- Phylum: Arthropoda
- Class: Insecta
- Order: Coleoptera
- Suborder: Polyphaga
- Infraorder: Cucujiformia
- Family: Cleridae
- Genus: Wolcottia
- Species: W. pedalis

Binomial name
- Wolcottia pedalis (LeConte, 1866)

Species of beetle

Wolcottia pedalis is a species of checkered beetle in the family Cleridae. It is found in North America.
