= Gradwohl =

Gradwohl is a surname is a variant in Grathwohl. Notable people with the surname include:

- Catherine Gradwohl (2 December 1949 – 2 January 2023), whose birth name was Catherine David (writer)
- Eva-Maria Gradwohl (born 1973), Austrian long-distance runner
- Gerald Gradwohl (born 1967), Austrian guitarist
- Gerd Gradwohl (born 1960), German para-alpine skier
- Ilse Gradwohl (born 1943), Mexican painter
- Judy Gradwohl, American executive

== See also ==
- Grathwohl
