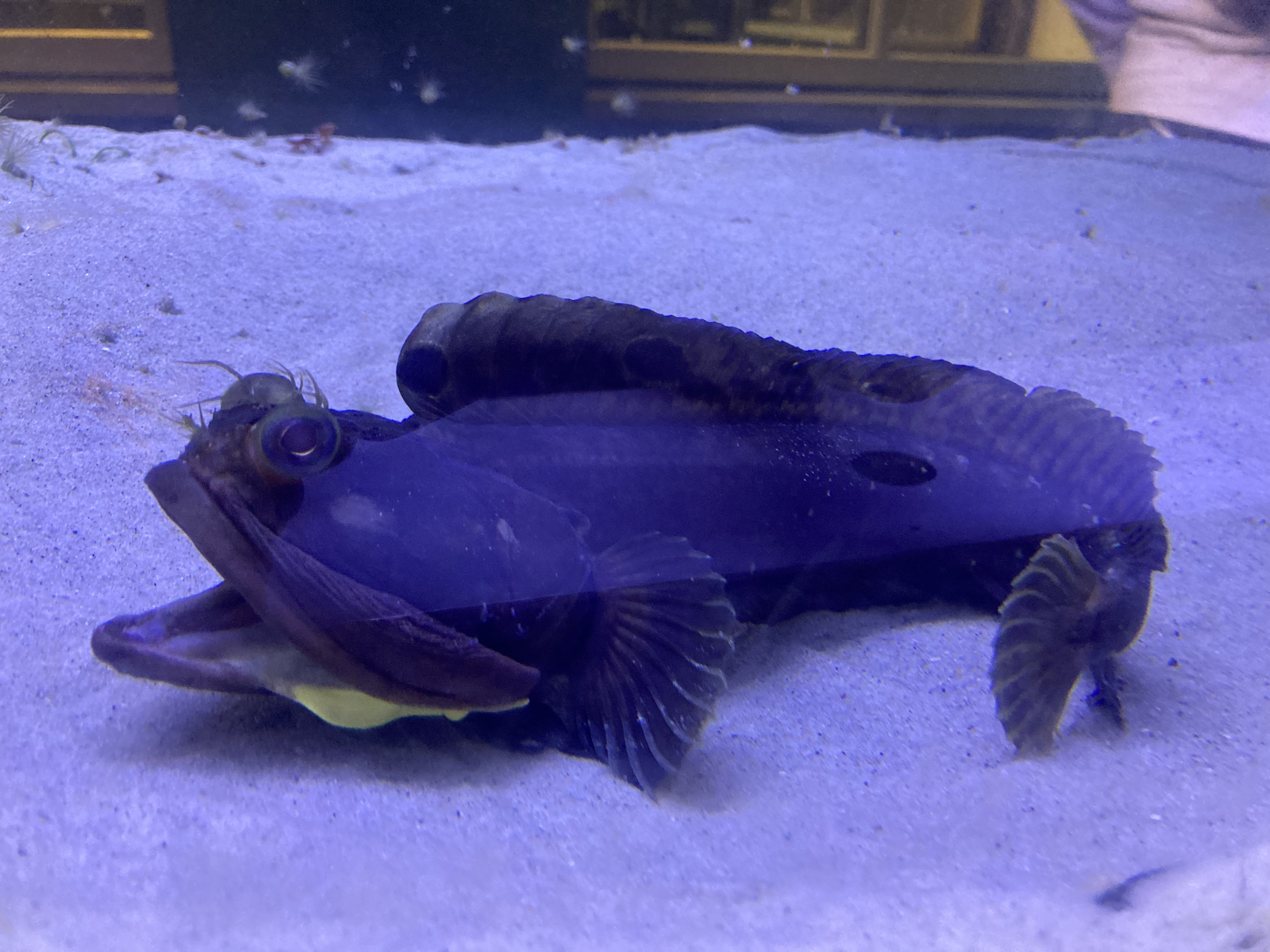

Conservation status
- Least Concern (IUCN 3.1)

Scientific classification
- Kingdom: Animalia
- Phylum: Chordata
- Class: Actinopterygii
- Order: Blenniiformes
- Family: Chaenopsidae
- Genus: Neoclinus
- Species: N. blanchardi

Binomial name
- Neoclinus blanchardi Girard, 1858

= Sarcastic fringehead =

Species of fish

The sarcastic fringehead (Neoclinus blanchardi) is a small saltwater tube-blenny that possesses an extremely large, brightly coloured mouth, which males display during territorial encounters, for which it has been given its common name. The term 'fringehead' reflects the distinctive ruff of tissue surrounding the fish's neck. The specific name honors Dr. S. B. Blanchard of San Diego, California, who collected specimens of this blenny and passed them on to Charles Frédéric Girard, who described it.

== Appearance ==
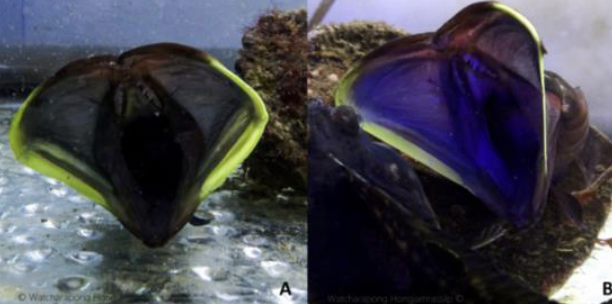
Sarcastic fringehead's vibrant colored gape

Sarcastic fringeheads can be up to 30 centimetres (12 in) long, and are mostly scaleless with great pectoral fins and reduced pelvic fins. Usually there are pale spots or patches on the cheeks. Males have a series of eye‑like markings on the spiny portion of the dorsal fin; each spot shows a vivid metallic blue centre bordered by a golden yellowish ring. The swimming movements of these fish mainly consist of short, dart-like movements. Their body coloration varies from warm brown to gray with a blotchy appearance.

Male sarcastic fringeheads are distinguished by their extremely wide mouth gape, which, when open, may be as much as four times its size when closed. The interior of the mouth is brightly colored, with yellow at the posterior, which is hypothesized to amplify its display. Additionally, the buccopalatal membranes exhibit green fluorescence.

== Similar species ==
The longjaw mudsucker (Gillichthys mirabilis), a similar species, also displays gaping behavior and elongated maxillae, indicating convergent evolution related to shelter defense strategies. Out of the three fringehead species (sarcastic, onespot, and yellowfin) in US waters, the sarcastic fringehead is the most aggressive. The jaw mechanics of Neoclinus blanchardi are similar to those of the extinct ichthyodectiform Dugaldia emmilta, indicating a shared evolutionary adaptation for maximizing mouth gape through lateral jaw movements.

== Ecology and behavior ==
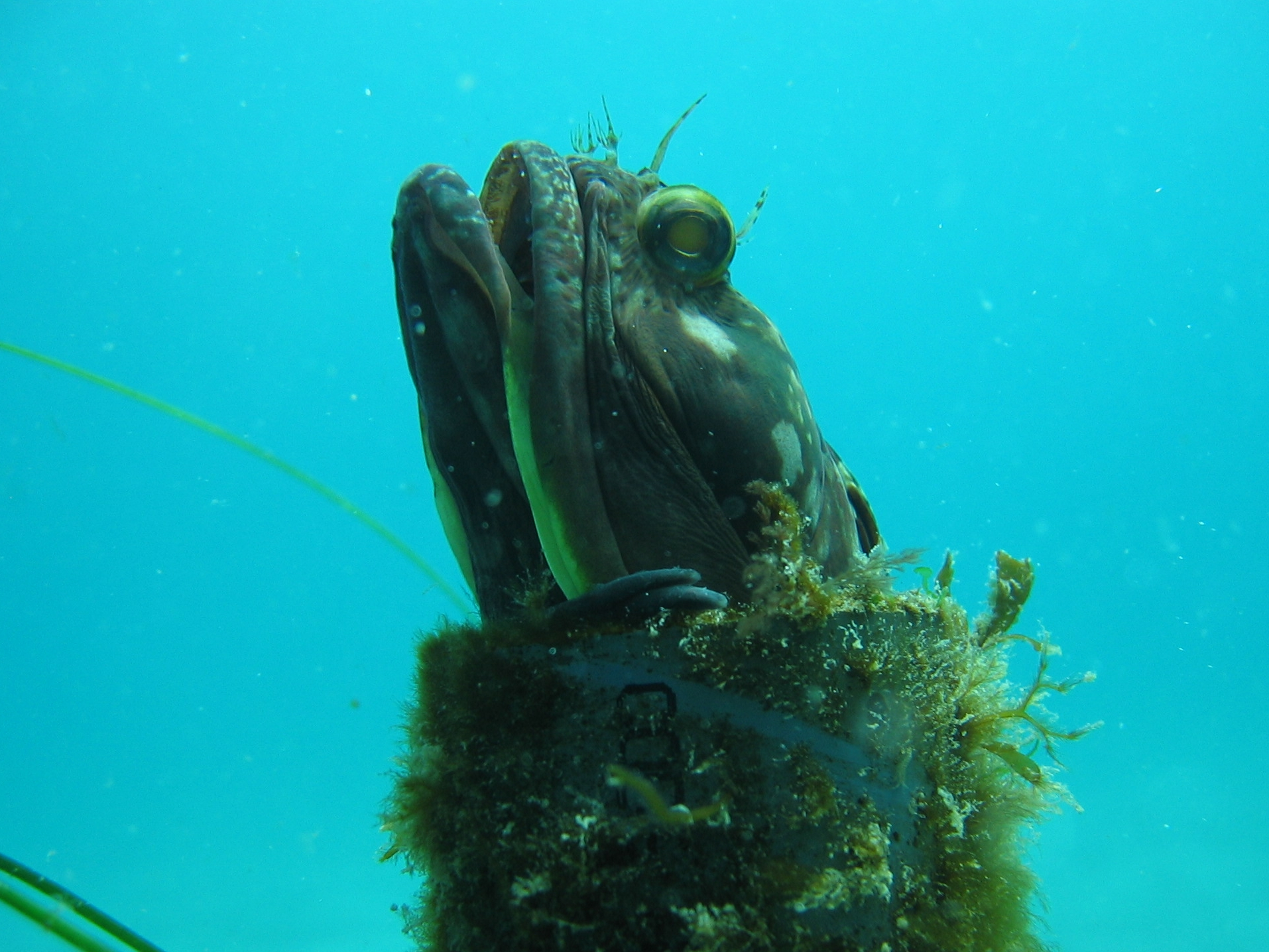
A sarcastic fringehead living in a plastic tube

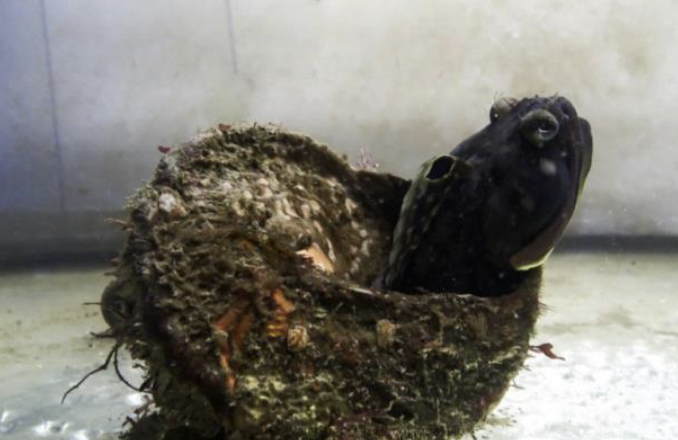
A sarcastic fringehead guards its shelter by projecting the head out.

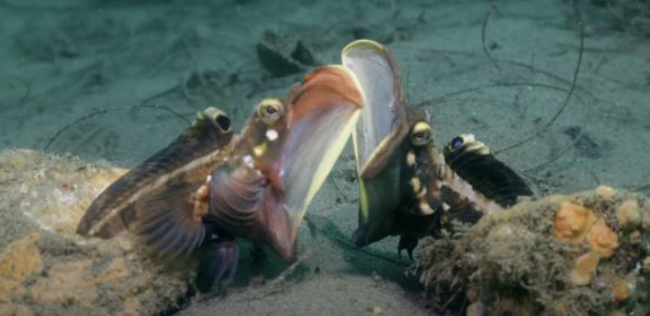
Two sarcastic fringeheads having a territorial scuffle

Sarcastic fringeheads live along sandy and muddy bottoms below the low tide line. They tend to back into objects and cavities, such shells, burrows, and crevices, exposing only their heads. They are also found living in man-made objects, such as bottles and soda cans. When two fringeheads have a territorial scuffle, they wrestle by pressing their distended mouths against each other, in a kissing motion. They press against each other until one is able to bite the other's head. This allows them to determine which is the larger fish, which establishes dominance. Territorial fights between males appear to be linked to competition for shelter, which is important for survival in crowded habitats. When a sarcastic fringehead loses a wrestling match with an intruder, it becomes displaced and must search for a new shelter, a process that can consume significant time and energy that could otherwise be spent foraging or mating. The time wasted searching for a new shelter can increase the risk of predation, as displaced fringeheads become more vulnerable while searching for a new home. The outcome of wrestling matches among fringeheads can be viewed as a stochastic process, where each encounter has a range of outcomes that affect the individual's daily energy expenditure and survival. Their cranial adaptations, especially their enlarged jaws, play a crucial role in territorial displays, which are important for competing for space in their rocky, subtidal habitats. The timing of developmental changes in the sarcastic fringehead's morphology directly influences its display capacity; younger individuals exhibit less pronounced behaviors in aggressive displays due to their smaller size and less developed jaw structures compared to mature adults, whose aggressive displays are amplified as they age. Although gaping displays are common in other Neoclinus species, the sarcastic fringehead (N. blanchardi) stands out with its unique display, which involves the lateral flaring of its unusually long maxillae. Divers have observed that despite the fish's small size, typically between 6 and 10 inches (150 and 250 mm), its territorial aggression and jaw-flaring display can be deceptively intense during encounters. Neoclinus blanchardi exhibits significant mobility of the maxilla due to its conical shape and deep socket. The flaring of maxillary membranes and other morphological features can be crucial for visual communication among conspecifics. The sarcastic fringehead exhibits distinct variations in aggressive displays compared to other fringehead species, suggesting that ecological pressures, such as heightened competition for resources, have shaped its unique behavioral traits. The evolution of the sarcastic fringehead's aggressive display is a prime example of heterochrony, where changes in the timing and rate of development have resulted in enhanced features that amplify its territorial and mating behaviors.

== Reproduction ==
The female spawns roughly 3,000 eggs under a rock, in clam burrows, or in other containers, after which the male plays a crucial role in guarding and fanning the eggs until they hatch. The eggs have a diameter of approximately 0.9 to 1.5 millimetres (0.035 to 0.059 in), and their filaments help them adhere to the nest and to one another. Upon hatching, the larvae measure approximately 3 millimetres (0.12 in) in length. Sarcastic fringeheads spawn between January and August at depths ranging from 45 to 90 feet (14 to 27 m). The genital papilla, located at the rear of the urogenital opening, differs between sexes: males have a pointed papilla, while females have a rounded one. Sarcastic fringeheads can live up to a maximum of about 6 years, which contributes to their reproductive strategies.

== Feeding habitats ==
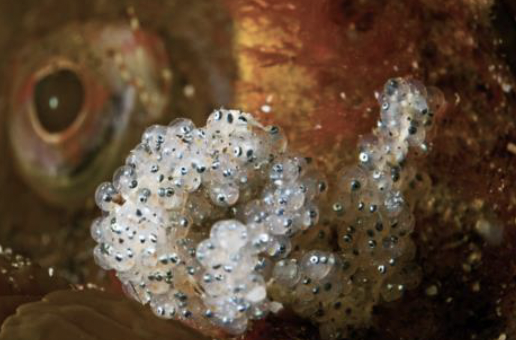
Sarcastic fringehead eggs

Due to the size of their mouths, sarcastic fringeheads are categorized as ram-suction feeders, relying on fast burst speeds and moderate suction to capture prey. During squid spawning season, they can consume large numbers of squid eggs. Outside of that, they mainly feed on crustaceans and planktonic prey. They modulate their gape size during feeding, using only half of their maximum mouth opening to eat. Variability in daily foraging time, influenced by the frequency of territorial encounters, may shape evolutionary adaptations in fringeheads, including gut size and efficiency based on food availability.

== Distribution ==
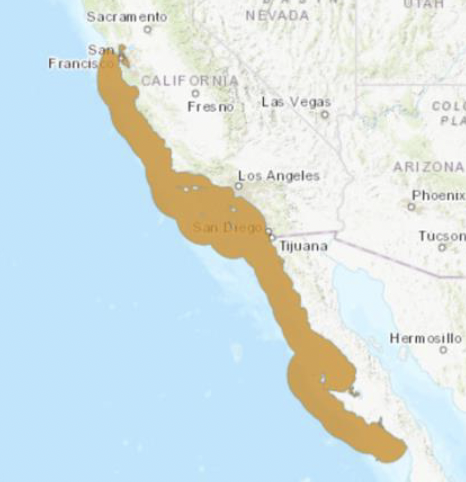
Geographic range map showing the distribution of sarcastic fringeheads across the North Pacific

They are found in the Pacific, off the coast of North America, from San Francisco, California, to central Baja California. Their depth range is from 3 to 73 metres (10 to 240 ft). Sarcastic fringeheads are part of the Neoclinus genus, which is found on both sides of the North Pacific Ocean but not in the waters between. This distribution suggests a historical dispersal event from their origin in the eastern Pacific.

== Conservation status ==
The sarcastic fringehead is classified as 'Least Concern' by the IUCN due to relatively low threats from human activities and its occurrence in areas that are protected. Despite their small size, sarcastic fringeheads are unlikely to be targeted by fishers due to their aggressive nature. When they are caught accidentally, sport and commercial anglers often find them challenging to handle due to the likelihood of being bitten by the needle-like teeth when they become agitated. Divers have noted that these fish can damage their wetsuits.
