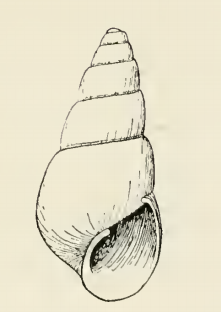
- Apertural view of the shell of Odostomia deliciosa

Scientific classification
- Kingdom: Animalia
- Phylum: Mollusca
- Class: Gastropoda
- Family: Pyramidellidae
- Genus: Odostomia
- Species: O. deliciosa

Binomial name
- Odostomia deliciosa Dall & Bartsch, 1907

Synonyms
- Odostomia (Evalea) deliciosa Dall & Bartsch, 1907 (basionym)

= Odostomia deliciosa =

Species of gastropod

Odostomia deliciosa is a species of sea snail, a marine gastropod mollusc in the family Pyramidellidae, the pyrams and their allies.

R.T. Abbott (1974) considered this species a synonym of Odostomia tenuisculpta Carpenter, 1864

== Description ==
The small shell is elongate-conic and translucent to milk-white. It measures 4 mm. The nuclear whorls are small and deeply immersed in the first of the succeeding turns, above which only a portion of the last turn is visible. The six post-nuclear whorls are moderately rounded, very weakly roundly shouldered at the summit and separated by a strongly marked suture. A narrow band appears about the summit showing its junction with the preceding turn. The periphery and the base of the body whorl are inflated and well-rounded. The entire surface of the base and the spire is marked by very fine lines of growth and numerous microscopic wavy spiral striations. The aperture is rather large, somewhat effuse anteriorly. The posterior angle is acute. The outer lip is thin. The columella is rather stout, strongly curved, and revolute, reinforced by the attenuated base, and covered with a strong fold at its insertion. This fold can be seen through the transparent shell as a quite strong lamella on the pillar of the turns.

== Distribution ==
This species occurs in the Pacific Ocean off California.
