= Neoclinus chihiroe =

Conservation status
- Least Concern (IUCN 3.1)

Scientific classification
- Kingdom: Animalia
- Phylum: Chordata
- Class: Actinopterygii
- Order: Blenniiformes
- Family: Chaenopsidae
- Genus: Neoclinus
- Species: N. chihiroe

Binomial name
- Neoclinus chihiroe Fukao, 1987

Species of fish

Neoclinus chihiroe is a species of chaenopsid blenny found around Japan, in the northwest Pacific ocean. It can reach a maximum length of 4.8 centimetres (1.9 in) SL.

== Etymology ==
The specific name "chihiroe" refers to Chihiro Okazaki, the wife of Dr. Toshio Okazaki, whom Fukao credits with leading to the discovery of Neoclinus chihiroe sister taxon N. okazakii.
