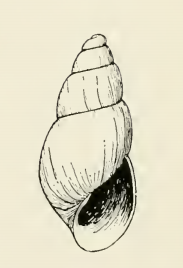
- Drawing of a shell of Odostomia valdezi

Scientific classification
- Kingdom: Animalia
- Phylum: Mollusca
- Class: Gastropoda
- Family: Pyramidellidae
- Genus: Odostomia
- Species: O. valdezi

Binomial name
- Odostomia valdezi Dall & Bartsch, 1907

Synonyms
- Odostomia (Evalea) valdezi Dall & Bartsch, 1907

= Odostomia valdezi =

Species of gastropod

Odostomia valdezi is a species of sea snail, a marine gastropod mollusc in the family Pyramidellidae, the pyrams and their allies.

This species is considered by R. Tucker Abbott (1974) as a synonym of Odostomia tenuisculpta Carpenter, 1864

== Description ==
The small, thin shell has a very elongate-oval shape. It is subdiaphanous to milk-white. Its length measures 3 mm. Its entire surface is marked by rather strong lines of growth and numerous microscopic spiral striations. The whorls of the protoconch are deeply obliquely immersed in the first of the succeeding turns, above which only the tilted edge of the last turn is visible. The five whorls of the teleoconch lie rather high between the sutures. They are well rounded, with narrowly roundly shouldered summits. The periphery and the base of the body whorl are inflated and well rounded, the latter with a very narrow umbilical chink. The oval aperture is moderately large. The posterior angle is acute. The columella is strongly curved, reinforced by the attenuated base and provided with a moderately strong fold opposite the umbilical chink.

== Distribution ==
This species occurs in the Pacific Ocean off Monterey, California.
