= Kate Stephens =

American naturalist

- Born: ca. 1853; London, England
- Died: August 29, 1954; San Diego, California
- Scientific career
- Fields: Conchology, Paleontology
- Workplaces: San Diego Natural History Museum

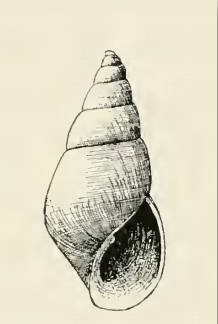
Odostomia stephensae Dall & Bartsch, 1909

Kate Brown Stephens was an American naturalist and the curator of mollusks and marine invertebrates at the San Diego Natural History Museum from 1910 to 1936.

== Biography ==
Stephens was born c. 1853 in London, England. Her father, Thomas Brown, was a cab driver; her mother, Mary Tyler Brown, died when Kate was in her late teens or early twenties. Helping to raise her younger brother George while the family lived in the Kensington area of London, Kate is said to have worked at the Natural History Museum. She immigrated to the United States around 1888–1890. She lived for a short time in the city of San Diego, working as a dressmaker, before moving out to the Witch Creek area in eastern San Diego County, where she may have taught school. In 1898, she married ornithologist and mammalogist Frank Stephens and began working with him as a collector and naturalist. Her early field work included collecting butterflies, but her research interest area was shells and fossils, and she became known as the authority on terrestrial and marine mollusks of the San Diego region.

Stephens accompanied her husband on many collecting trips in the early 1900s, including a four-month expedition in 1902 to the Colorado Desert for the U. S. Biological Survey. Her field notes from that trip and others record in detail traveling and camping in the California and Arizona desert regions. She and her husband were among the naturalists on the 1907 University of California Alexander expedition to southeastern Alaska.

In July 1910, the San Diego Society of Natural History hired Stephens as curator of collections, and she effectively became the San Diego Natural History Museum's first paid employee. Her husband served as the director and Curator of Mammals for the museum's first eleven years, and together the couple significantly influenced the scope and direction of the new museum. Widely considered an authority on the algae and shells of the Pacific, Stephens was the museum's curator of mollusks and marine invertebrates; her work included identifying fossil shells of the San Diego County in connection with paleontological work conducted by Frank Stephens and U. S. Grant IV. At the museum she taught natural history to local children; among her students were Laurence Huey, later the museum's curator of birds and mammals, and Carl L. Hubbs, ichthyologist at the Scripps Institution of Oceanography.

Five molluscan species were named in her honor:

- Amphithalamus stephensae Bartsch, 1927
- Cerithiopsis stephensae Bartsch, 1909
- Gafrarium stephensae Jordan, 1936 (syn. Gouldia californica Dall, 1917)
- Odostomia stephensae Dall & Bartsch, 1909 (syn. O. tenuisculpta Carpenter, 1864)
- Rissoina stephensae Baker, Hanna & Strong, 1930

In addition, a chaenopsid blenny, Neoclinus stephensae, was named in her honor in 1953 by Carl. L Hubbs, Stephens having collected the type.

Retiring from the museum in 1936, Stephens continued her interest in conchology into her 90s, until disabled by vision loss in her later years. Stephens died on August 29, 1954, in San Diego.

== Works ==
Kate Stephens's field notes have been digitized by the San Diego Natural History Museum Research Library and are available on the Internet Archive.
