= Neoclinus nudus =

Conservation status
- Least Concern (IUCN 3.1)

Scientific classification
- Kingdom: Animalia
- Phylum: Chordata
- Class: Actinopterygii
- Order: Blenniiformes
- Family: Chaenopsidae
- Genus: Neoclinus
- Species: N. nudus

Binomial name
- Neoclinus nudus J. S. Stephens & V. G. Springer

Species of fish

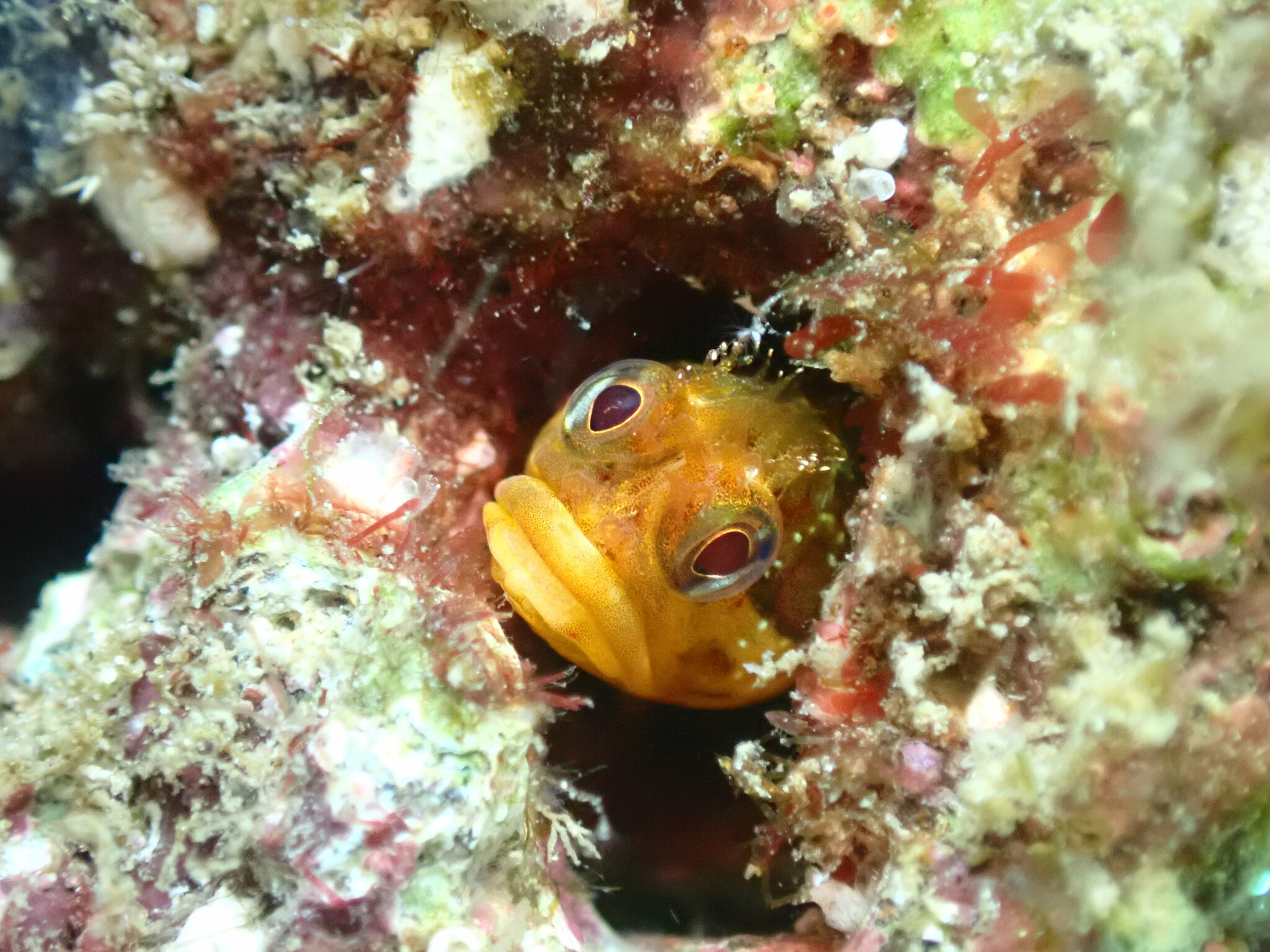
Neoclinus nudus specimen

Neoclinus nudus is a species of chaenopsid blenny found in coral reefs around Okinawa Island, Japan, and Taiwan, in the northwest Pacific ocean. Males can reach a maximum length of 5.2 centimetres (2.0 in) SL, while females can reach a maximum length of 4.6 centimetres (1.8 in).
