= Neoclinus nudiceps =

Conservation status
- Data Deficient (IUCN 3.1)

Scientific classification
- Kingdom: Animalia
- Phylum: Chordata
- Class: Actinopterygii
- Order: Blenniiformes
- Family: Chaenopsidae
- Genus: Neoclinus
- Species: N. nudiceps

Binomial name
- Neoclinus nudiceps Murase, Aizawa & Sunobe, 2010

Species of fish

Neoclinus nudiceps is a species of chaenopsid blenny found around Japan in the north-west Pacific Ocean where it is inhabits cavities within rocky areas.
