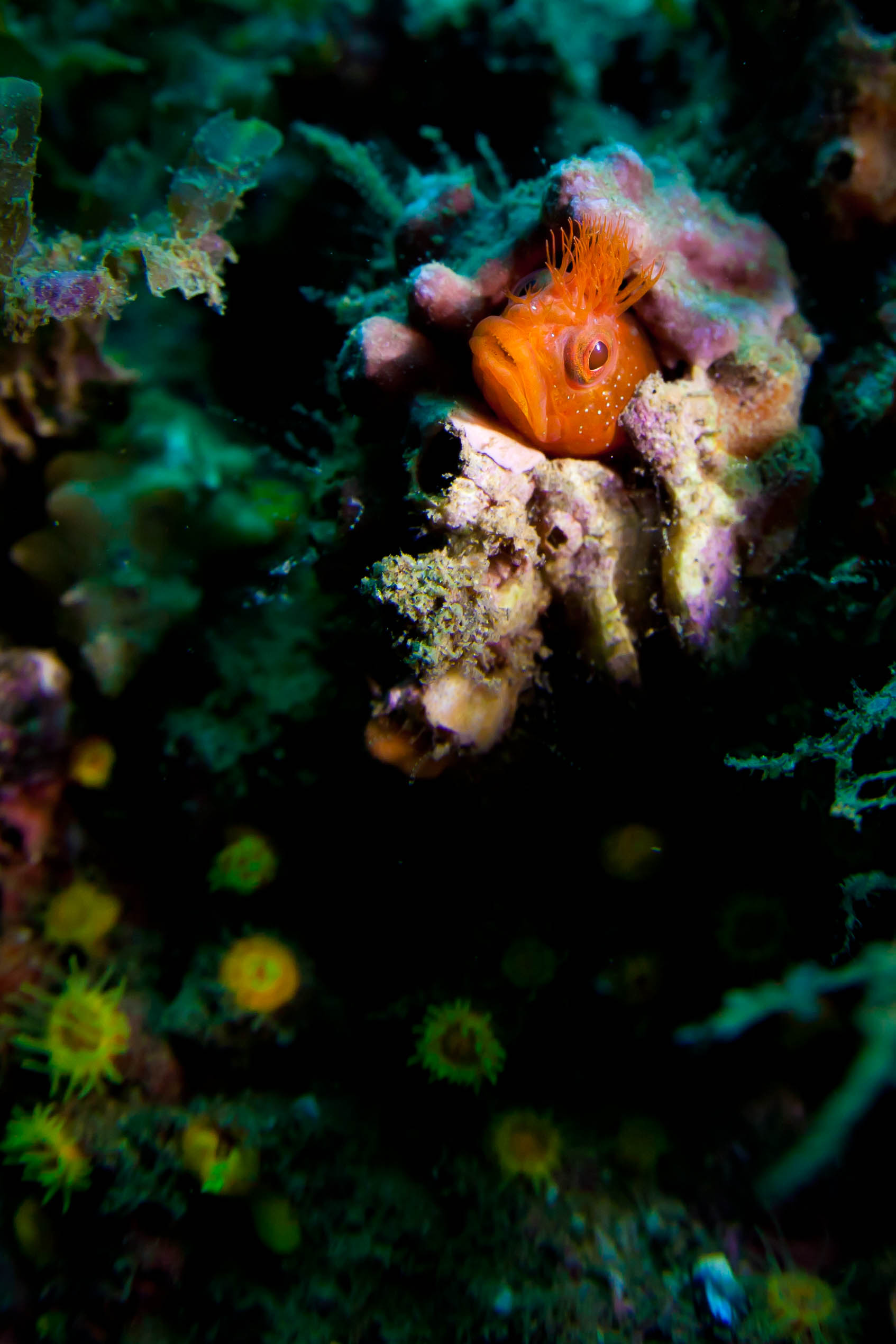

Conservation status
- Least Concern (IUCN 3.1)

Scientific classification
- Kingdom: Animalia
- Phylum: Chordata
- Class: Actinopterygii
- Division: Teleostei
- Order: Blenniiformes
- Family: Chaenopsidae
- Genus: Neoclinus
- Species: N. bryope

Binomial name
- Neoclinus bryope (D. S. Jordan & Snyder, 1902)

Synonyms
- Zacalles bryope Jordan & Snyder, 1902

= Neoclinus bryope =

Species of fish

Neoclinus bryope, is a species of chaenopsid blenny found around Japan and South Korea in the Western Pacific ocean. It can reach a maximum length of 8 centimetres (3.1 in) TL.
