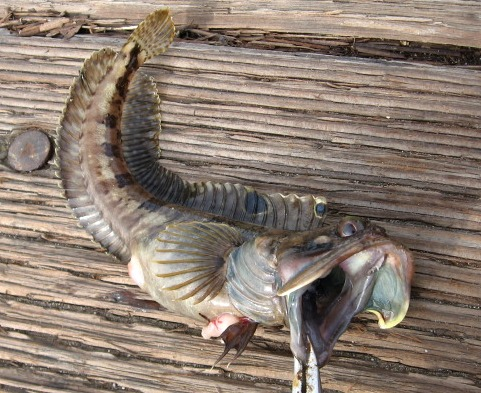
- Neoclinus blanchardi

Scientific classification
- Domain: Eukaryota
- Kingdom: Animalia
- Phylum: Chordata
- Class: Actinopterygii
- Order: Blenniiformes
- Family: Chaenopsidae
- Genus: Neoclinus; Girard, 1858

Type species
- Neoclinus blanchardi Girard, 1858

Synonyms
- Calliblennius Barbour, 1912; Zacalles Jordan & Snyder, 1902

= Neoclinus =

Genus of fishes

Neoclinus is a genus of chaenopsid blennies found in the North Pacific ocean along the coasts of California, Baja California, Japan, Korea and Taiwan.

== Species ==
There are currently 11 recognized species in this genus:

- Neoclinus blanchardi Girard, 1858 (Sarcastic fringehead)
- Neoclinus bryope (D. S. Jordan & Snyder, 1902)
- Neoclinus chihiroe Fukao, 1987
- Neoclinus lacunicola Fukao, 1980
- Neoclinus monogrammus Murase, Aizawa & Sunobe, 2010
- Neoclinus nudiceps Murase, Aizawa & Sunobe, 2010
- Neoclinus nudus J. S. Stephens & V. G. Springer, 1971
- Neoclinus okazakii Fukao, 1987
- Neoclinus stephensae C. L. Hubbs, 1953 (Yellowfin fringehead)
- Neoclinus toshimaensis Fukao, 1980
- Neoclinus uninotatus C. L. Hubbs, 1953 (Onespot fringehead)
