= St. Nicholas (magazine) =

1873 American children's magazine

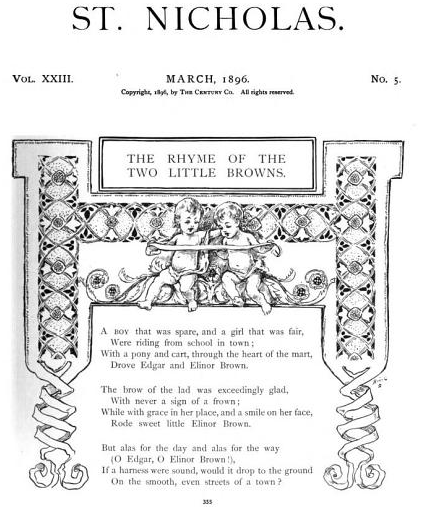
- St. Nicholas, 1896
- Categories: Children's
- Founder: Roswell Smith and Mary Mapes Dodge
- First issue: November 1873; 153 years ago
- Final issue: 1943; 83 years ago
- Country: United States
- Based in: New York City, U.S.
- Language: English
- OCLC: 1764817

St. Nicholas was a popular monthly American children's magazine, founded by Scribner's in 1873 and named after the Christian saint. The first editor was Mary Mapes Dodge, who continued her association with the magazine until her death in 1905. Dodge published work by the country's leading writers, including Louisa May Alcott, Frances Hodgson Burnett, Mark Twain, Laura E. Richards and Joel Chandler Harris. Many famous writers were first published in St. Nicholas League, a department that offered awards and cash prizes to the best work submitted by its juvenile readers. Edna St. Vincent Millay, F. Scott Fitzgerald, E. B. White, and Stephen Vincent Benét were all St. Nicholas League winners.

St. Nicholas ceased publication in 1940. A revival was attempted in 1943, but only a few issues were published before St. Nicholas folded once more.

== Founding ==
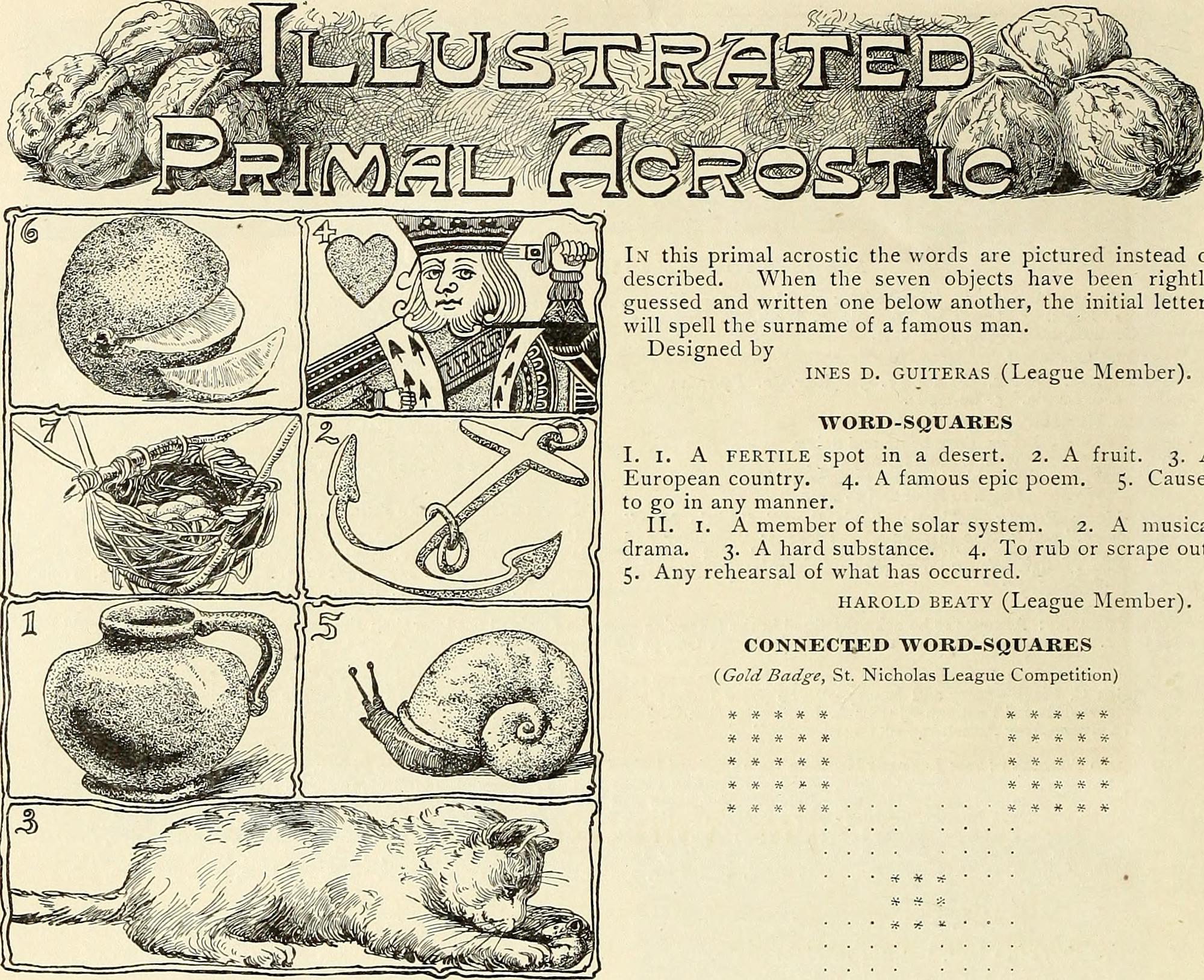
In this 1873 "primal acrostic" the words are pictured instead of described. When the seven objects have been rightly guessed and written one below another, the initial letters will spell the surname of a famous man (Jackson).

In 1870 Roswell Smith, cofounder of the magazine publishing company Scribner & Company, contacted Mary Mapes Dodge to inquire if she would be interested in working for a projected new children's magazine. At the time Dodge was an associate editor of the weekly periodical Hearth and Home, as well as the author of children's novels, including the best-seller Hans Brinker, or the Silver Skates.

Dodge had specific ideas about what a children's magazine should and shouldn't be. She felt it must not be "a milk-and-water variety of the periodicals for adults. In fact, it needs to be stronger, truer, bolder, more uncompromising than the other.... Most children...attend school. Their heads are strained and taxed with the day's lessons. They do not want to be bothered nor amused nor petted. They just want to have their own way over their own magazine."

The first issue of St. Nicholas: Scribner's Illustrated Magazine for Girls and Boys was dated November, 1873. It had 48 pages and a press run of 40,000 copies. Although St. Nicholas never reached the high circulation numbers of some other magazines (in the 1890s The Youth's Companion had 500,000 subscribers compared with St Nicholas's 100,000 in Christmas 1883 ), within a few years it had acquired numerous competing children's periodicals. Magazines that merged with St. Nicholas were Our Young Folks and The Children's Hour in 1874, The Schoolday Magazine and The Little Corporal in 1875, and Wide Awake in 1893.

From the start, St. Nicholas was beautifully printed with illustrations from a consistent group of artists and wood engravers, such as Walter James Fenn, used by Scribner & Company's other magazine, Scribner's Monthly.

== St. Nicholas League ==
In 1899 St. Nicholas League began. It was one of the magazine's most important departments, and had the motto of "Live to learn and learn to live." Each month contests were held for the best poems, stories, essays, drawings, photographs, and puzzles submitted by the magazine's young readers. Winners received gold badges, runners-up received silver badges, and "honor members", winners of both gold and silver badges, were sent cash prizes."There is no doubt about it," E.B. White wrote. "The fierce desire to write and paint that burns in our land today, the incredible amount of writing and painting that still goes on in the face of heavy odds, are directly traceable to St Nicholas."

Many St. Nicholas League winners went on to achieve prominence. The most prolific poetry contest winner was Edna St. Vincent Millay, who had seven poems published in the League. E.B. White and Bennett Cerf won essay contests. William Faulkner made the honor roll for his drawings, and F. Scott Fitzgerald was honored for a photograph.

== Long-term editors ==
=== Mary Mapes Dodge as editor ===
From 1873 until 1881, Mary Mapes Dodge was involved with the day-to-day operations of all aspects of St. Nicholas. She created the magazine departments, wrote the monthly column Jack-in-the-Pulpit, and contributed many stories and poems.

In the first issue she explained why she chose St. Nicholas for the name of the magazine:

Is he not the boys' and girls' own Saint, the especial friend of young Americans?... And what is more, isn't he the kindest, best, and jolliest old dear that ever was known?... He has attended so many heart-warmings in his long, long day that he glows without knowing it, and, coming as he does, at a holy time, casts a light upon the children's faces that lasts from year to year.... Never to dim this light, young friends, by word or token, to make it even brighter, when we can, in good, pleasant helpful ways, and to clear away clouds that sometimes shut it out, is our aim and prayer.

In order to retain her juvenile readers for many years, Dodge created departments for different age groups. For Very Little Folks (1873–1897) was a page of simple stories printed in large type. The Puzzle Box contained riddles, math and word games. Young Contributors Department (begun in 1875) encouraged the writing skills of older children. The Agassiz Association was begun in 1885 to develop the awareness of nature, and the importance of conservation. Hundreds of Agassiz chapters were organized across the nation, and reports of activities were printed in the department.

Dodge knew many famous writers, and was able to persuade them to submit their work to her magazine. Frances Hodgson Burnett's novel Little Lord Fauntleroy first appeared as a St. Nicholas serial, beginning in the November 1885 issue. Her novella Sara Crewe appeared in the December 1887 issue. Other novels to be serialized in St. Nicholas were Louisa May Alcott's Eight Cousins and Mark Twain's Tom Sawyer Abroad. Dodge asked Rudyard Kipling to do a fiction series, and he sent her the Jungle Book stories.

Within a few years, St. Nicholas increased in size to 96 pages, and reached a circulation of 70,000 subscribers.

In 1881, the Scribner publishing house withdrew from ownership of its two magazines, and they were purchased by The Century Company. Scribner's Monthly became Century Magazine, and St. Nicholas: Scribner's Illustrated Magazine for Girls and Boys became St. Nicholas: An Illustrated Magazine for Young Folks. The printing and art facilities of the prosperous new owner was made available to St. Nicholas, and the magazine continued to thrive.

Dodge's eldest son, Harry, died in 1881. In her grief she relinquished much of her responsibilities to her assistant editor, William Fayal Clarke. Though no longer in control of all day-to-day operations, Dodge continued working at St. Nicholas until her death in 1905.

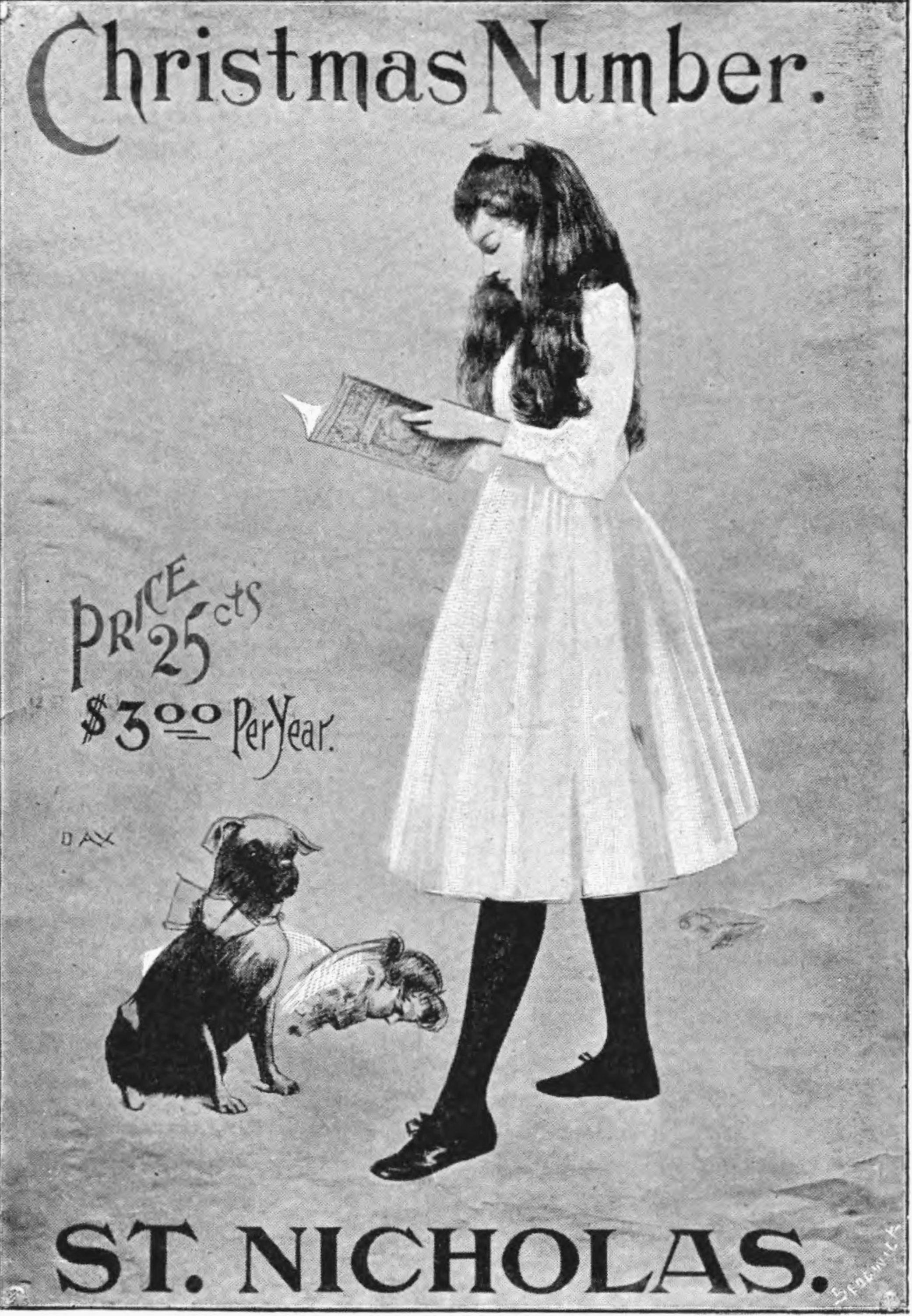
Christmas number (issue)

=== William Fayal Clarke as editor ===
William Fayal Clarke was twenty years old when, in 1874, he joined the staff of St. Nicholas. In 1878 he was promoted to associate editor. Starting in 1881, he took on more responsibilities when, upon the death of her son, Mary Mapes Dodge limited her work load.

As editor, Clarke placed more emphasis on departments, perhaps because he lacked Dodge's close ties to famous authors. Departments devoted to short plays, science and philately (stamp collecting) were added to St. Nicholas. Circulation remained at about 70,000.

In 1927, Clarke stepped down as editor. He retired in 1928, after 54 years with the magazine. Within a few years, St. Nicholas began a steady decline in circulation.

== Final years ==
In November 1927 George F. Thomson, the former editor of Our Young Folks (a magazine taken over by St. Nicholas in 1874) became editor. He was replaced after two years, and a rapid turnover of editors began.

In 1930 St. Nicholas was sold to American Education Press, and the magazine's full name was changed to St. Nicholas for Boys and Girls. In 1935 St. Nicholas was sold to Educational Publishing Corporation.

Editors under the last two owners were Albert Gallatin Lanier (1930), May Lamberton Becker (1930–32), Eric J. Bender (1932–34), Chesla Sherlock (1935), Vertie A. Coyne (1936–40), and Juliet Lit Sterne (1943).

In 1940 the format was changed to a large-print picture-and-story-magazine, aimed at beginner readers. Slick paper was replaced with soft paper. The last issue was February 1940.

With a March 1943 issue, St. Nicholas was brought back, in a format similar to early days. Its owner and editor was Juliet Lit Stearns; business manager was F. Orlin Tremaine. It failed after four issues.

== Availability of issues and stories ==
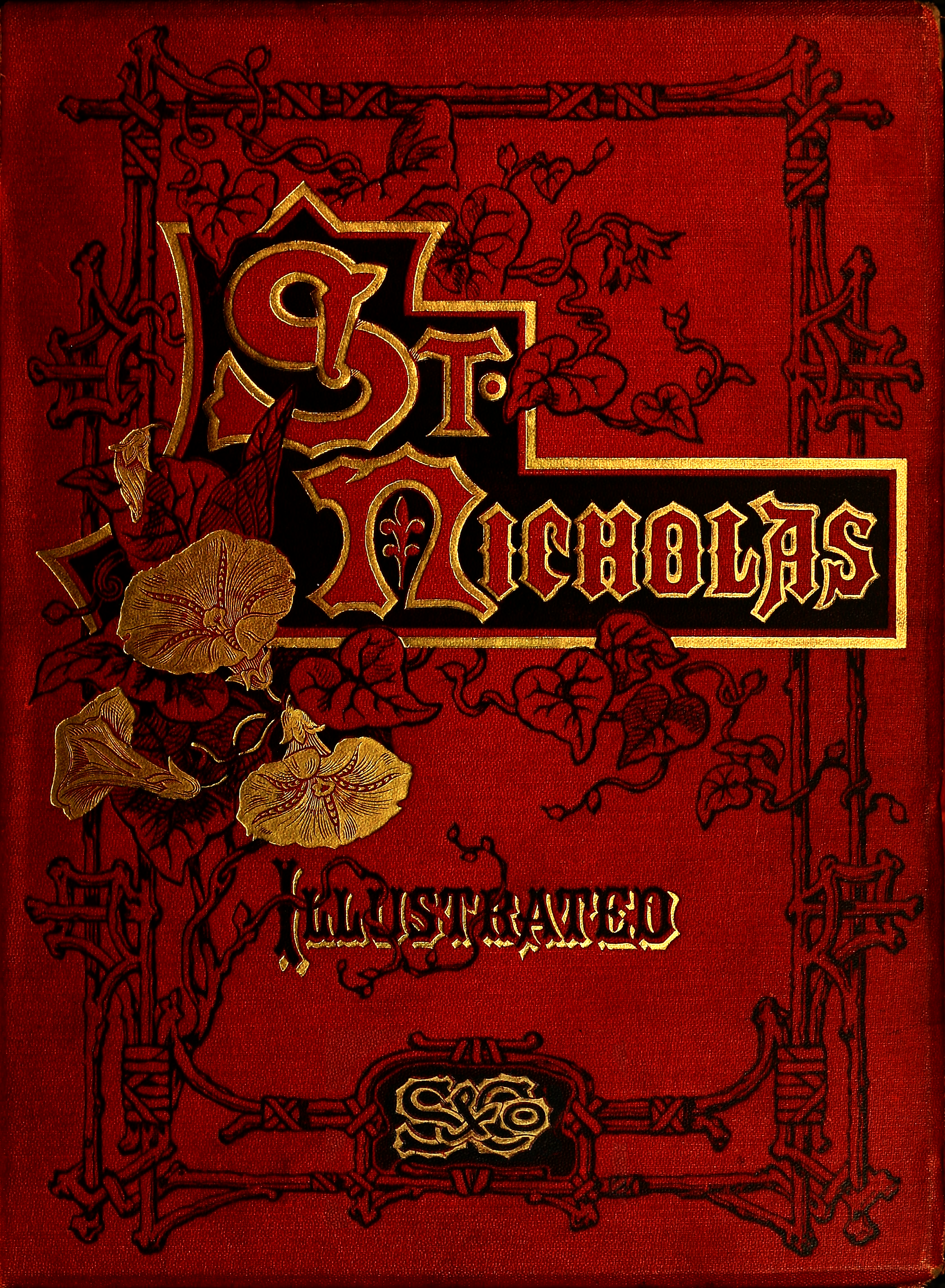
St Nicholas-cover

A popular service provided to St. Nicholas subscribers was that, for a small fee, six issues could be sent off to be bound into a hard-back volume, with crimson covers and a gold-stamped title. These bound volumes are available through used book sellers.

Many anthologies of favorite St. Nicholas stories have been compiled. The two best-known collections were edited by Henry Steele Commager and published by Random House (the head of Random House, Bennett Cerf, had once been a St. Nicholas subscriber and (as noted above) contributor to the famous St. Nicholas League). The St. Nicholas Anthology came out in 1948, followed by The Second St. Nicholas Anthology in 1950. Treasury of Best-Loved Stories, Poems Games & Riddles from St. Nicholas Magazine, edited by Commager, was published in 1978 by Greenwich House. The first two volumes were reprinted by Greenwich House in 1982 and 1984. In addition, Burton Frye compiled A St. Nicholas Anthology: the Early Years for Meredith House in 1969.

In 2003 and again in 2004, William F. Buckley Jr. edited The National Review Treasury of Classic Children's Literature and The National Review Treasury of Classic Children's Literature: Volume Two, both with stories gathered from St. Nicholas.

A number of St. Nicholas issues can be downloaded free of charge. Sources shown in External Links are Project Gutenberg and A Tribute to St. Nicholas: A Magazine for Young Folks, which contains a menu of online links.

== See also ==
- The Brownies' Book
