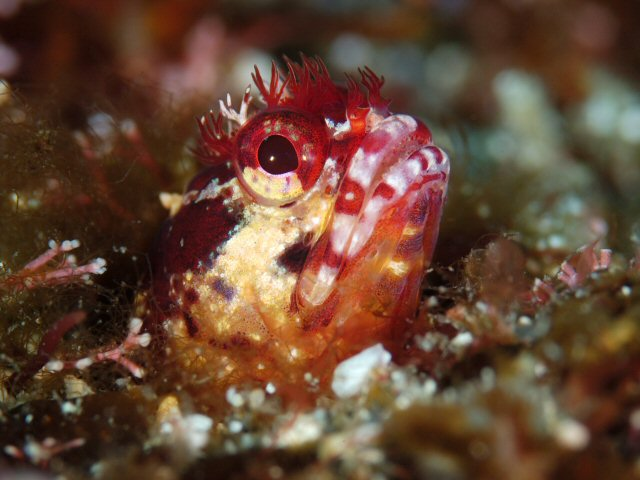

Conservation status
- Least Concern (IUCN 3.1)

Scientific classification
- Kingdom: Animalia
- Phylum: Chordata
- Class: Actinopterygii
- Division: Teleostei
- Order: Blenniiformes
- Family: Chaenopsidae
- Genus: Neoclinus
- Species: N. toshimaensis

Binomial name
- Neoclinus toshimaensis Fukao, 1980

= Neoclinus toshimaensis =

Species of fish

Neoclinus toshimaensis is a species of chaenopsid blenny found in rocky reefs around Japan, in the northwest Pacific ocean. It can reach a maximum length of 7 centimetres (2.8 in) TL. This species feeds primarily on benthic algae and weeds.
