= Neoclinus lacunicola =

Conservation status
- Least Concern (IUCN 3.1)

Scientific classification
- Kingdom: Animalia
- Phylum: Chordata
- Class: Actinopterygii
- Division: Teleostei
- Order: Blenniiformes
- Family: Chaenopsidae
- Genus: Neoclinus
- Species: N. lacunicola

Binomial name
- Neoclinus lacunicola Fukao, 1980

Species of fish

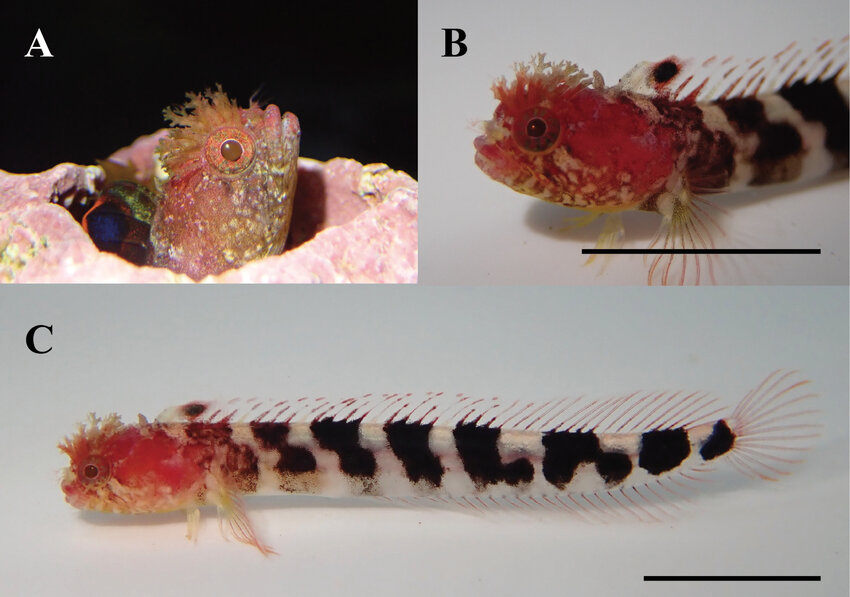
A. An underwater photo; B and C. Images taken in the laboratory.; Scale bar: 1 cm.

Neoclinus lacunicola is a species of chaenopsid blenny found around Japan, in the northwest Pacific ocean. It can reach a maximum length of 6 centimetres (2.4 in) TL.
