= Grathwohl (surname) =

Grathwohl is a surname of south German origin. Notable people with the surname include:

- Larry Grathwohl (October 13, 1947 – July 18, 2013), FBI informant
- Peter Grathwohl (born 1958), German geologist and expert in hydrology and environmental processes
