= Cecil Hotel (San Diego) =

Coordinates: 32.6914°N 117.1760°W

- The building in 1915
- Former names: Crane Hotel
- Alternative names: Hotel Cecil

General information
- Location: Core, San Diego
- Address: 1134 Sixth Street, San Diego, California, United States
- Opened: 1912

Technical details
- Structural system: Steel frame

Design and construction
- Developer: San Diego Construction Company

The Cecil Hotel, also known as Hotel Cecil and formerly known as the Crane Hotel, opened in 1912 as the first steel frame structure in San Diego and the only class A, fireproof building in the city.

It operated until 1931 when the hotel moved to the C Street location of the Hotel Polhemus.

== History ==
At 1134 Sixth Street, the hotel was built by the San Diego Construction Company and was the first steel frame structure in San Diego. It was initially contracted to Crane Brothers but was leased in 1911 to secretary James H. Babcock of Babcock Investment Company, president W. M. Dickinson and treasurer C. A. Blodgett.

The hotel had 61 rooms with the intention of adding an additional 52 rooms by the time in opened for business on February 1, 1912. By April, the hotel had opened and was the only class A, fireproof building in the city. In June, the San Diego Construction Company petitioned the city for an open air stage at the hotel's rear. Babcock supervised Bab's German Garden Restaurant neighboring the hotel. Visitors of the hotel include Billie Ritchie and Chick Gandil.

In 1912, the San Diego Natural History Museum held its first exhibits in rooms at the Cecil. The hotel had expanded to 75 rooms by 1919. That same year, The Pacific Telephone and Telegraph Company occupied the first floor of the Cecil.

In 1920, the Greeters of San Diego held an election at the U.S. Grant Hotel, electing George Best at the first vice president of the hotel. In June 1921, the hotel was sold to Charles L. Dix for $110,000. Later that year, San Diego Athletic Club organizer Charles H. Daniels died of heart disease in his room. In 1923, the Marston Company purchased the hotel for and undisclosed amount of money. Dix said that part of the lease included that management would not change for three years. In 1924, Dix relocated to Los Angeles where he and Banks Hanner built the 700 room Cecil Hotel. A representative for RICE and hernia expert held a events at the hotel in 1925 and 1933. In 1926, D. D. Whitten was proposed for board of governor.

=== Cecil Hotel relocation ===
In 1930, the Marston Company planned to expand the hotel for the Marston store's rug and drapery departments. In 1931, the hotel moved to a different building nearby on C Street, formerly called the Hotel Polhemus that would later become the C Street Inn.

== Criminal Incidents ==
In 1912, an American flag was stolen in front of the hotel and Babcock had an advertising solicitor arrested for issuing bad checks to an innkeeper.
