= Neoclinus stephensae =

Conservation status
- Least Concern (IUCN 3.1)

Scientific classification
- Kingdom: Animalia
- Phylum: Chordata
- Class: Actinopterygii
- Order: Blenniiformes
- Family: Chaenopsidae
- Genus: Neoclinus
- Species: N. stephensae

Binomial name
- Neoclinus stephensae C. Hubbs, 1953

Species of fish

Neoclinus stephensae, the yellowfin fringehead, is a species of chaenopsid blenny found in the eastern Pacific ocean. It can reach a maximum length of 10 centimetres (3.9 in) TL. The specific name honours the collector of the type, the British-American conchologist Kate Stephens (ca. 1853–1954) who was Curator of Mollusks and Marine Invertebrates at San Diego Natural History Museum and who was over 100 years old at the time the species was described.
