= Frank Stephens (naturalist) =

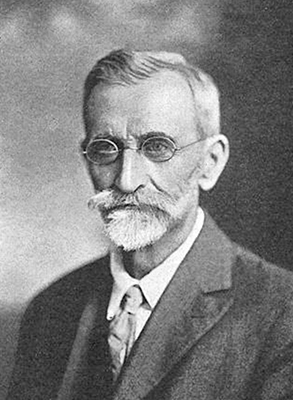
- Born: April 2, 1849; Livingston County, New York
- Died: October 5, 1937 (aged 88); San Diego, California
- Scientific career
- Fields: Ornithology, Mammalogy
- Workplaces: San Diego Natural History Museum

Frank Stephens (1849–1937) was an American naturalist and the first director of the San Diego Natural History Museum. He was considered the pioneer naturalist of the Southwest, studying the mammals and birds of California, Arizona, and Baja California. His personal specimen collection of 2,000 birds and mammals, donated in 1910, was the foundation of the San Diego Natural History Museum's Birds & Mammals Department, now a major resource on bird and mammal species of western North America, including Baja California.

== Biography ==
Born on April 2, 1849, near Portage in Livingston County, New York, Frank Stephens was the eldest of the four sons of Nelson and Julia (née Preston) Benson. During his early years, the family moved to the Midwest, farming in Michigan, Illinois, Missouri and Kansas. An interest in wildlife led him at age 22 to take some lessons in taxidermy. At age 24, he married Elizabeth Fowler, and in 1874 the couple moved to Colorado, where he studied taxidermy with ornithologist Charles E. Aiken.

Moving to California in 1876, he settled in Witch Creek, San Diego County, California, where he farmed and continued collecting, working regularly for the U. S. Biological Survey and the University of California's Museum of Vertebrate Zoology (MVZ). In the early 1880s, Stephens collected in southwest New Mexico and Arizona for Aikens and for William Brewster (ornithologist) of Harvard's Museum of Comparative Zoology. He collected for Donald Ryder Dickey and C. Hart Merriam, among others. He was a collector for the U. S. Biological Survey's 1891 Death Valley Expedition.

Stephens's wife Elizabeth died in January 1898, and he married Kate Brown in August 1898. She accompanied him on several collecting trips, including the 1907 expedition to southeastern Alaska sponsored by Annie Montague Alexander. In her own right, Kate Stephens became an authority on shells.

Stephens was active both in the field and the study throughout his 60-year career. He participated in Joseph Grinnell's 1910 MVZ expedition on the Colorado River and continued camping out on collecting trips into his 70s. He was a frequent contributor to The Condor, founded the San Diego Society of Natural History's scientific journal, Transactions, and in 1906 self-published his major work, California Mammals (illustrated by W. J. Fenn). Stephens was an early member of the San Diego Society of Natural History and the first curator of mammalogy for the San Diego Natural History Museum; he was also a founding member of the San Diego Zoological Society. He is credited with collecting at least 45 type specimens.

== Death ==
Although he had faced difficult conditions on many desert treks, Stephens was felled in the city by modern technology: crossing a street in San Diego, he was struck by a street car on September 25, 1937, and died ten days after the accident on October 5, 1937, at Mercy Hospital in San Diego.

== Memberships ==
- American Ornithological Union, 1883 (associate); 1901 (member)
- Cooper Ornithological Club, 1894, 1912 (honorary member)
- American Association for the Advancement of Science, 1926 Fellow
- San Diego Society of Natural History
- Zoological Society of San Diego
- Biological Society of Washington
- American Society of Mammalogists, 1919 (charter member)
