= W. J. Fenn =

American artist and illustrator

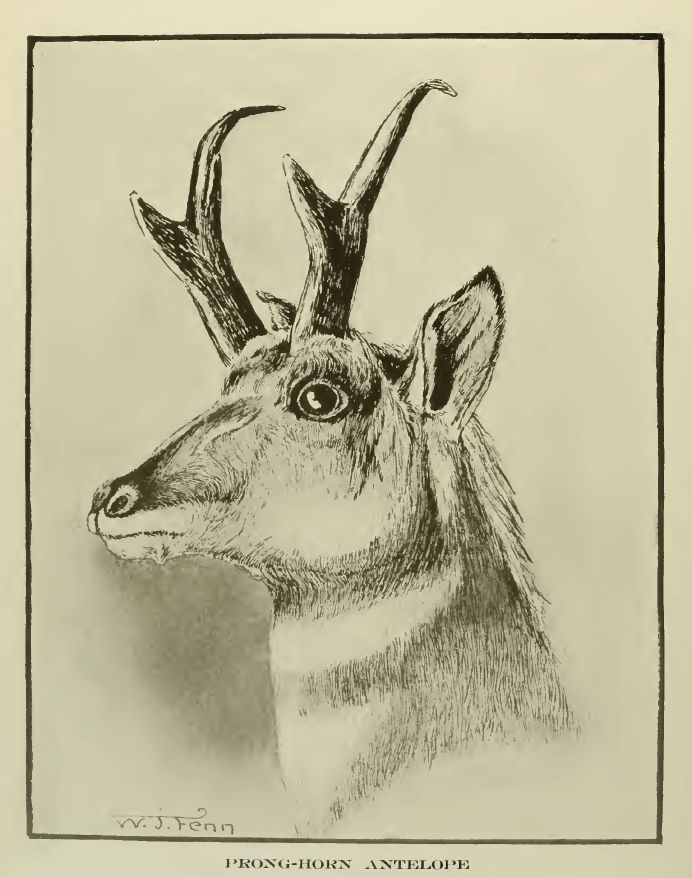
Pronghorn from Frank Stephens' "California Mammals"

Walter James Fenn (6 January 1862 in Brooklyn, New York – 5 July 1961 in Chula Vista, California), usually signing his work as W. J. Fenn, was an American artist and illustrator.

Walter was the son of Mary L. Fenn, an amateur painter. He contributed to St. Nicholas Magazine and Harper’s Magazine during the 1880s and 1890s.

Lillian Dee Fenn (1864 - 1947), Mary Fenn (1867 - 1950), Harry Fenn (1845–1911)

== Books illustrated ==
- California Mammals (1906), Frank Stephens
