= Neoclinus okazakii =

Conservation status
- Least Concern (IUCN 3.1)

Scientific classification
- Kingdom: Animalia
- Phylum: Chordata
- Class: Actinopterygii
- Order: Blenniiformes
- Family: Chaenopsidae
- Genus: Neoclinus
- Species: N. okazakii

Binomial name
- Neoclinus okazakii Fukao, 1987

Species of fish

Neoclinus okazakii is a species of chaenopsid blenny found in rocky reefs around Japan, in the northwestern Pacific ocean. Males of this species can reach a maximum length of 6.2 centimetres (2.4 in) SL, while females can reach a maximum length of 4.5 centimetres (1.8 in).

== Etymology ==
The specific name "okazakii" refers to Dr. Toshio Okazaki, who is credited with leading to the identification of Neoclinus okazakii as a distinct species.
