= San Diego Natural History Museum =

Natural history museum in California

Coordinates: 32°43′55.6″N 117°8′50.29″W

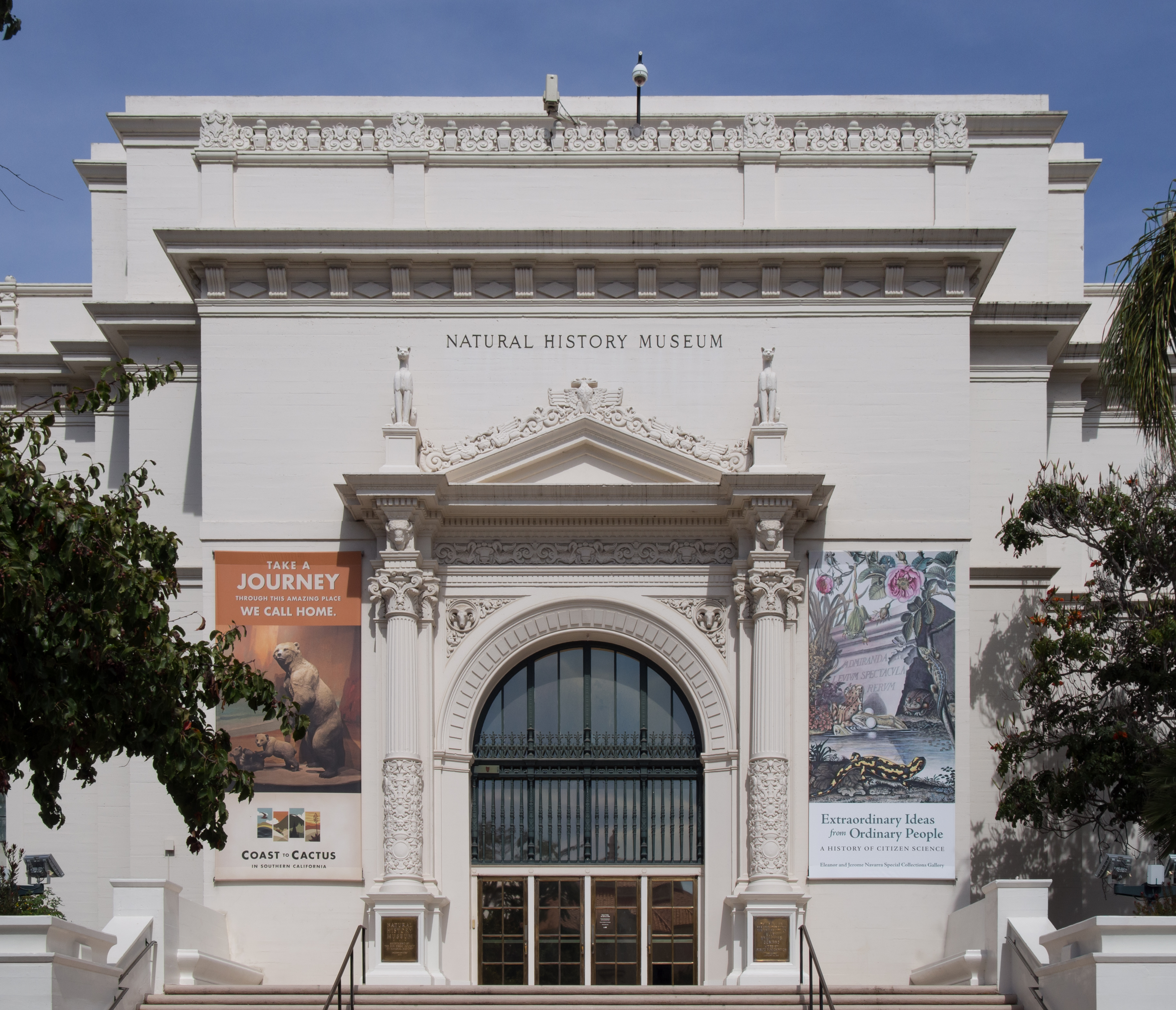
- Established: 1874
- Location: 1788 El Prado, Balboa Park; San Diego, California 92101; United States
- Type: Natural history museum
- Public transit access: SDMTS Buses: Local#7, Rapid#215, Trolley: City College Stop, transfer to #7
- Website: www.sdnhm.org

The San Diego Natural History Museum is a museum in Balboa Park in San Diego, California. It was founded in 1874 as the San Diego Society of Natural History. It is the second oldest scientific institution west of the Mississippi and the oldest in Southern California. The present location of the museum was dedicated on January 14, 1933. A major addition to the museum was dedicated in April 2001, doubling exhibit space.

== History ==
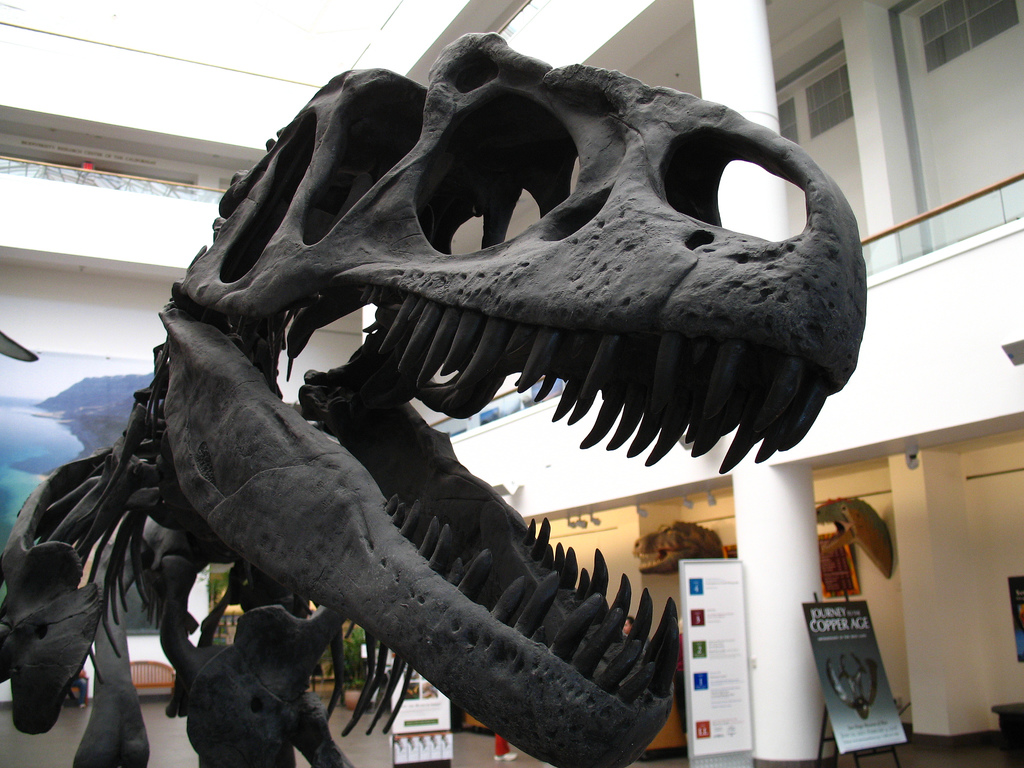
Allosaurus at the San Diego Natural History Museum

The San Diego Natural History Museum grew out of the San Diego Society of Natural History, which was founded on October 9,1874. The Natural History Society was founded by George W. Barnes, Daniel Cleveland, Charles Coleman, E. W. Hendrick and O. N. Sanford. It is the oldest scientific institution in southern California, and the second oldest west of the Mississippi.

In its initial years, the San Diego Society of Natural History was the region's primary source of scientific culture, serving a small but growing community eager for information about its natural resources. Early society members established a Volunteer County Weather Service in 1875, petitioned to create Torrey Pines State Natural Reserve in 1885 and Anza-Borrego Desert State Park, and garnered support for the Zoological Society of San Diego.

In 1887, the Society was given a lot on Sixth Avenue between B and C streets by E. W. Morse, a former president of the city's short-lived Lyceum of Natural Sciences. The Cecil Hotel was eventually built on part of the society's lot, and in June 1912 the Society began to meet there.

In 1910, the San Diego Society of Natural History hired Kate Stephens, an authority on terrestrial and marine mollusks, as curator for its collections. These included the personal collection of her husband, mammalogist and ornithologist Frank Stephens, who donated over 2000 bird and mammal specimens to the Society in 1910. In June 1912, Katherine and Frank Stephens installed the Society's first museum exhibits at the Hotel Cecil, where they could be viewed by the public on selected afternoons.

The Sixth Avenue property hosted the museum's exhibits for a very short time, roughly 1912–1917. However, it remained the property of the Society until 1987, when it was sold to the Trammel Crow Company. Money raised by the sale became part of the Museum of Natural History's endowment fund.

=== Exposition Buildings, Balboa Park ===
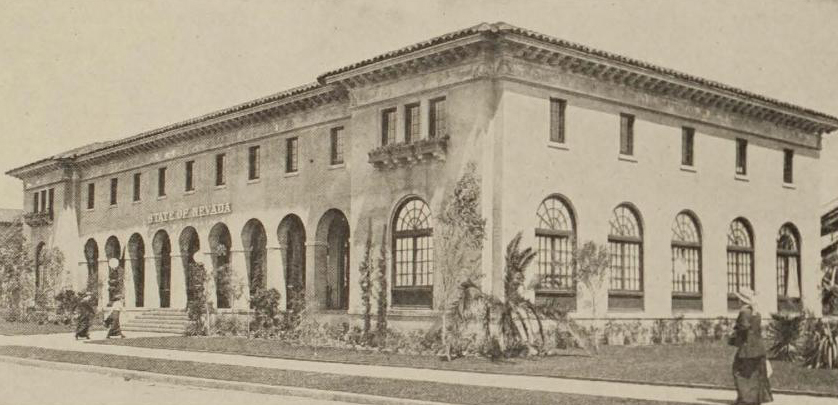
Nevada State Building, Balboa Park

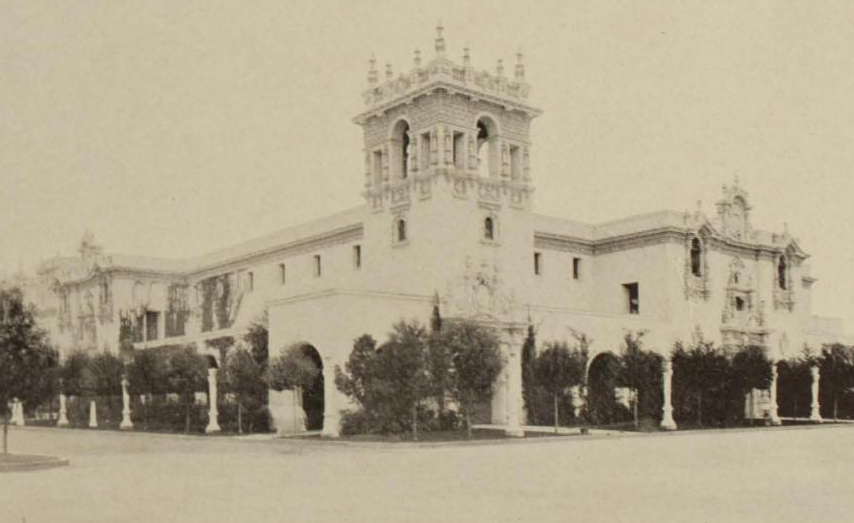
Foreign and Domestic Arts Building, Balboa Park

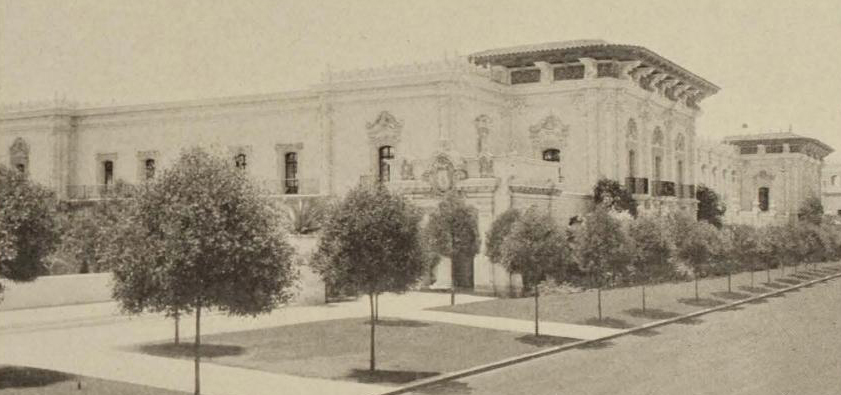
Commerce & Industries Building, Balboa Park

Various supporters of the 1915 Panama–California Exposition at Balboa Park expressed interest in repurposing buildings from the Exposition. This was complicated because the actual title to the land in Balboa Park remained with the City of San Diego. In June 1916, museum supporter G. S. Thompson proposed that "The one legal ground that a private museum corporation has that will permit it to occupy city-owned buildings in a public park is that the museum authorities maintain exhibits that will be free, i.e., without admission charges, and open at all times to the public."

The museum eventually occupied three different buildings from the Exposition in Balboa Park, none of which was ideally suited to museum use. In 1917, the Society paid $500 to the Panama–California Exposition Corporation for the vacant Nevada State Building. The Society moved its growing collections and library into the building in February 1917, thus creating the San Diego Natural History Museum. Frank Stephens served as the first director of the museum from 1917 to 1920. The Board identified its mission as being "to educate and help people know and love nature". Using specimens from the museum's collections, the institution developed educational outreach programs with city and county schools.

Unfortunately, many of the buildings at the Exposition had been intended as temporary structures. The two-story Nevada building, with its arcades, flanking wings, and Spanish-Renaissance trim, was not built to last. The museum obtained permission from the Park Commission to move to the 1915 Foreign Arts Building, which it remodeled in 1920. When the Foreign Arts Building proved too small, the museum expanded into the 1916 Canadian Building (previously the 1915 Commerce and Industries Building). This new space was opened to the public on December 9, 1922. The museum's intention was to eventually combine the buildings.

=== William Templeton Johnson Building, Balboa Park ===
From 1922 until his death in 1946, Clinton G. Abbott was the museum's director. During Abbott's period as director, the museum was able to build and move into long-term quarters. Other notable naturalists and curators of this period include Guy Fleming, Laurence M. Huey, and Laurence M. Klauber.

In 1925, a nearby fire raised concerns about the safety of the existing museum buildings. Community leaders recognized the need for a permanent museum of adequate size that would be both fire-proof and earthquake-proof. Ellen Browning Scripps was a major benefactor of the proposed building project.

In 1932, San Diego's leading architect, William Templeton Johnson, was commissioned by the Society of Natural History to design its new museum building on Balboa Park's East Prado. Johnson had earned his reputation with his design of the Fine Arts Gallery (now The San Diego Museum of Art) and the downtown San Diego Trust & Savings Bank, among other buildings. The museum building combined Spanish and Moorish touches. Yellow and blue tiles mark a row of arches under a balustrade; surprisingly, given the Spanish influences, the building did not have a tiled roof.

The construction of the permanent headquarters was made possible through a grant of $125,000 from Ellen Browning Scripps, and by public subscription. However, the full amount needed for the building could not be raised in the Depression years. Only the first unit of the building, at the south end of the lot, and one wing extending toward the north, could be built. The north and east exterior facades were left plain as temporary walls slated for future expansion, and remained so for 60 years. The $175,000 Natural History Museum building was formally dedicated on January 14, 1933.

=== World War II ===
The Society was notified on March 8, 1943, that the United States Navy wished to take over the Natural History Museum for hospital use at once, becoming the infectious diseases ward. Some renovation took place in the facility, including the addition of an elevator designed to handle hospital gurneys and a nurses' station between floors. Both features remain in use today. The U.S. Navy takeover of the museum building for the duration of World War II resulted in damage to the collections, exhibits, and the building itself. The main library and its librarian were moved to San Diego State College; the rest of the treasured and fragile exhibits were hastily packed, crated and moved into a total of 32 separate places. Exhibits too large to be moved were stuffed into the north wing on the main floor. Director Clinton G. Abbott and a staff of four were allowed only limited access to an area of the basement.

Once staff were allowed to reoccupy the building, on July 1, 1949, major renovations commenced. Forced to look at all collections and exhibits by this rehabilitation process, the board adopted a firm policy to restrict collections to the southwestern United States and northern Mexico. The museum continued its steady growth with post-war San Diego, despite periods of financial stress. The American Alliance of Museums accredited the museum in 1974.

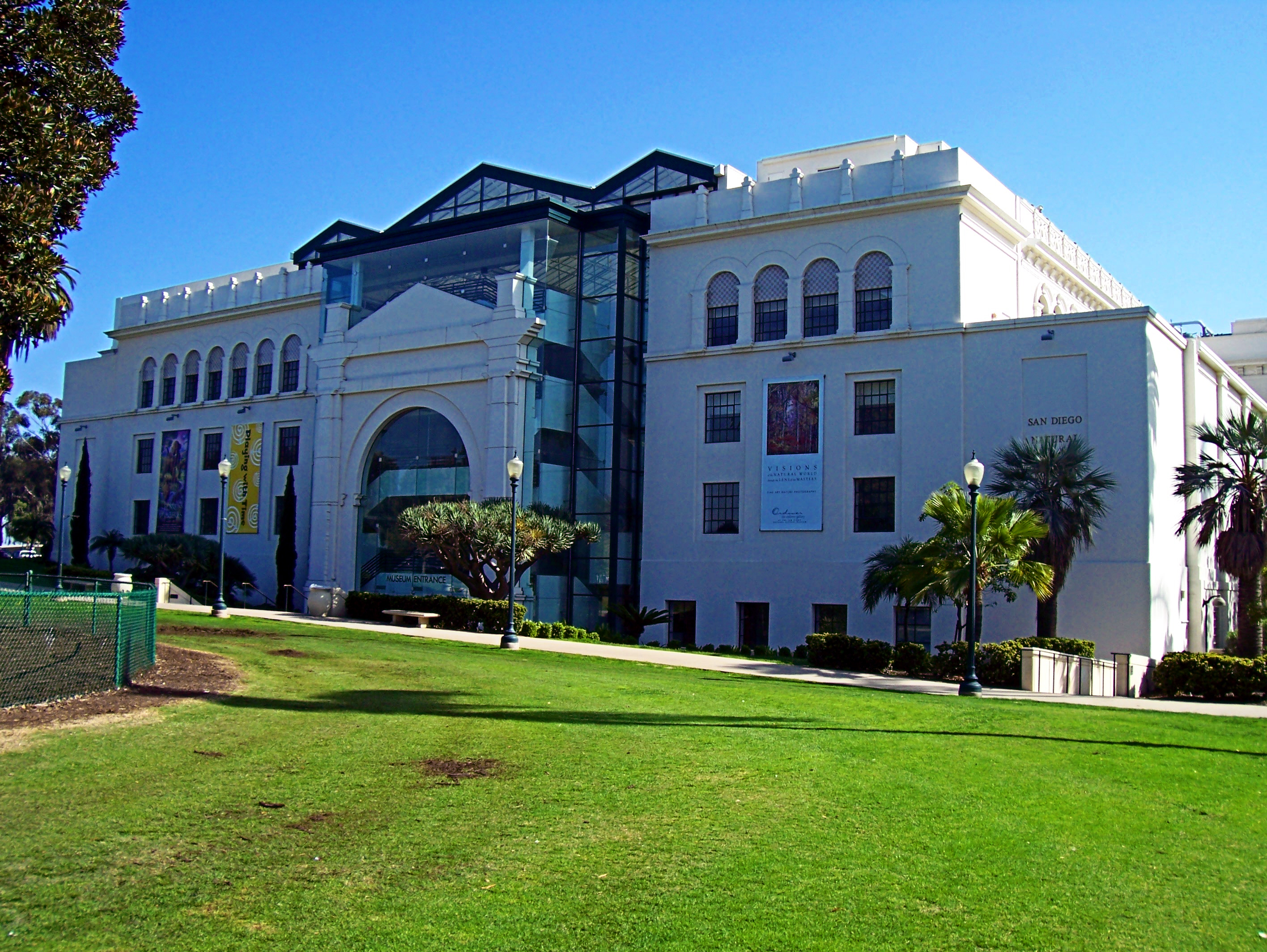
Expanded museum with Postmodern style facade.

=== Postmodern Expansion, 2001 ===
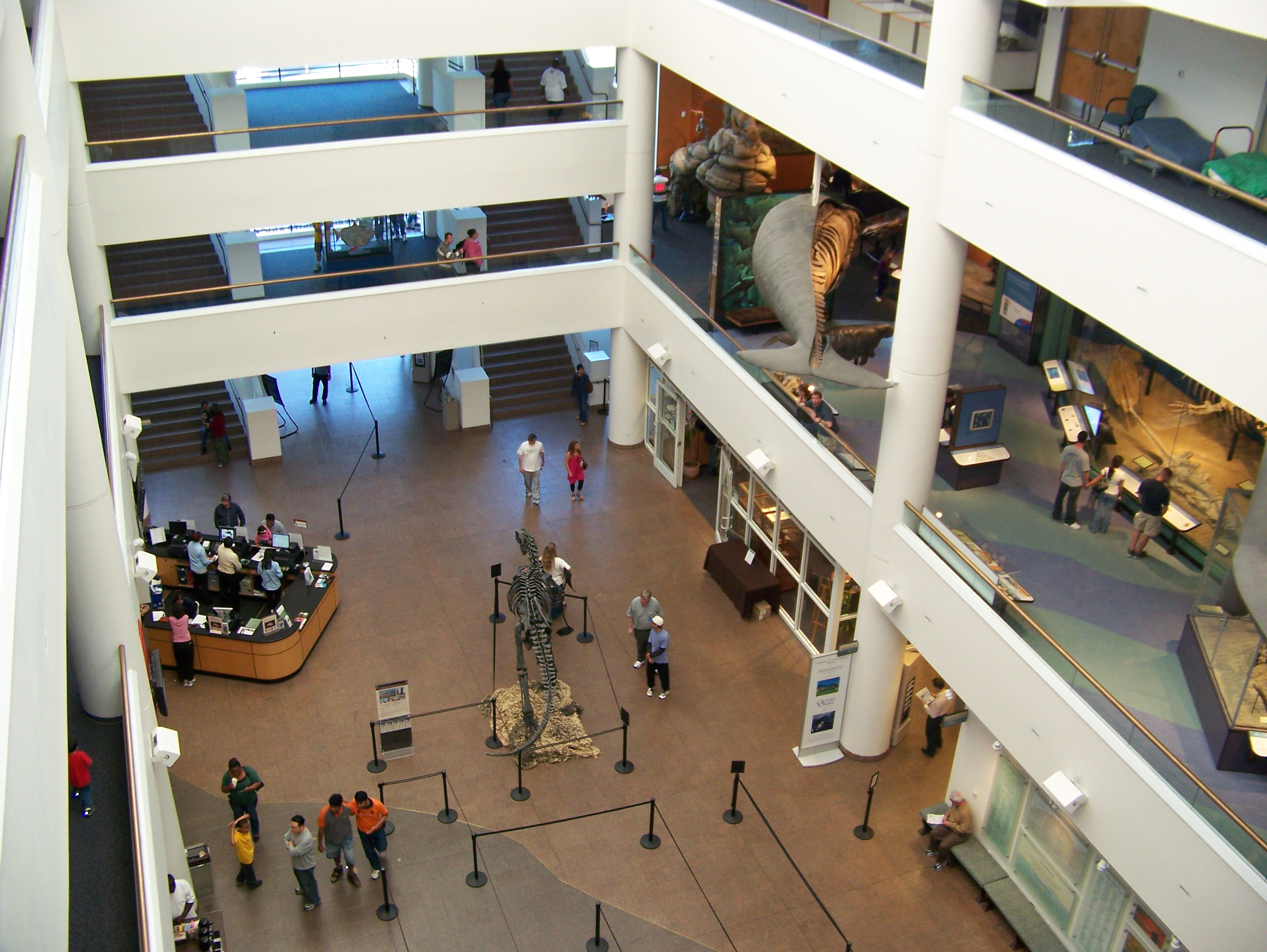
Interior atrium, with view down to lobby.

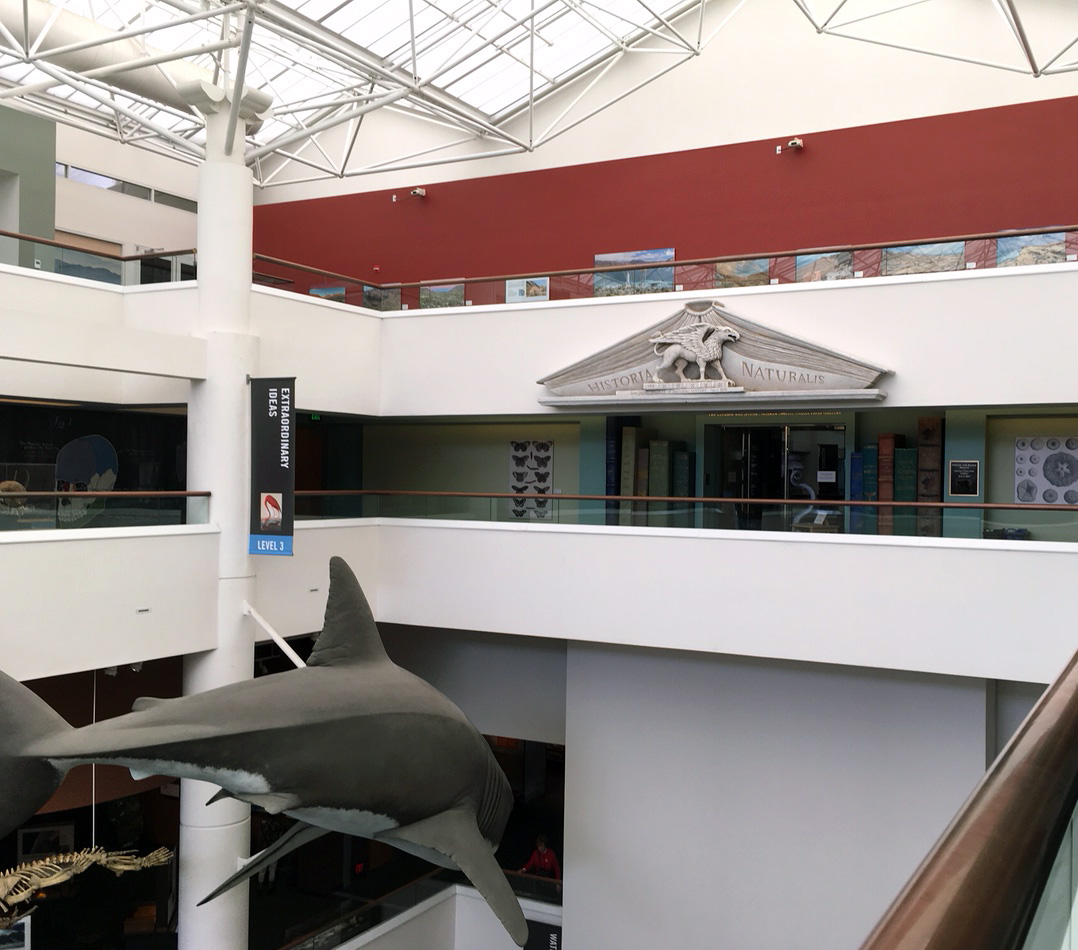
View of the atrium, north side, showing a megalodon shark and entrance to library exhibition.

In 1991, Michael Hager took over the position of President and CEO of the San Diego Natural History Museum. With Robert F. Smith, he led the museum through a strategic planning process that focused the museum's collection strategies on southern and Baja California, and led to the development of the Biodiversity Research Center of Southern California, a collaborative Environmental Science Education Center for the United States and Mexico, and a major capital campaign for the expansion of the museum itself.

In April 2001, new design and construction more than doubled the size of the 1933 building, from 65,000 square feet (6,000 m^{2}) of usable space to approximately 150,000 square feet (14,000 m^{2}). The entrance received a new Postmodern style facade and glassed atrium. The project architects were Richard Bundy and David Thompson Architects Inc. The expansion also provided new space for the museum's research, educational, and administrative activities. In 2016, Judy Gradwohl succeeded Hager as President and CEO, the first women to hold the position in the museum's 150 year history. A Paleontology Center opened on the basement floor in June 2025, curated by Tom Deméré.

LEED Certification

In December 2009, the San Diego Natural History Museum was awarded the Leadership in Energy and Environmental Design−LEED for Existing Buildings: Operations & Maintenance (LEED-EB: O&M) Certification. It is one of the oldest privately owned institutions to achieve the award.

== Exhibitions and programs ==
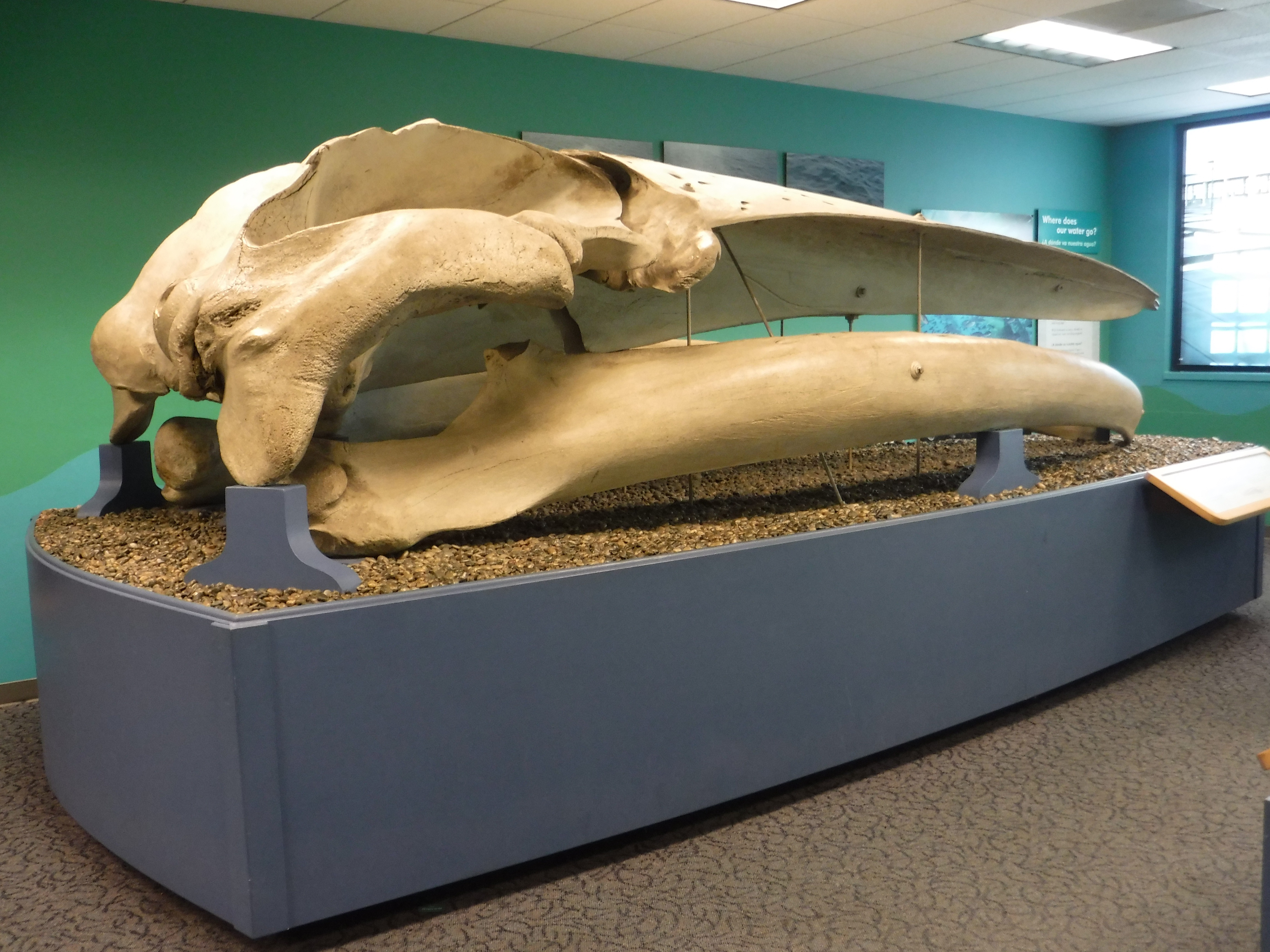
Finback Whale skull

With the addition of the new wing to the museum, areas for permanent exhibitions were created, along with five new exhibition halls. Also added was the state-of-the-art Charmaine and Maurice Kaplan Theater with a 56' screen and a 4k Christie Laser projector.

The new display installations eliminated the formerly popular Old Mine mineralogy gallery, that had displayed mineral specimens, gemstones, and fluorescent rocks and minerals.

=== Current exhibitions ===
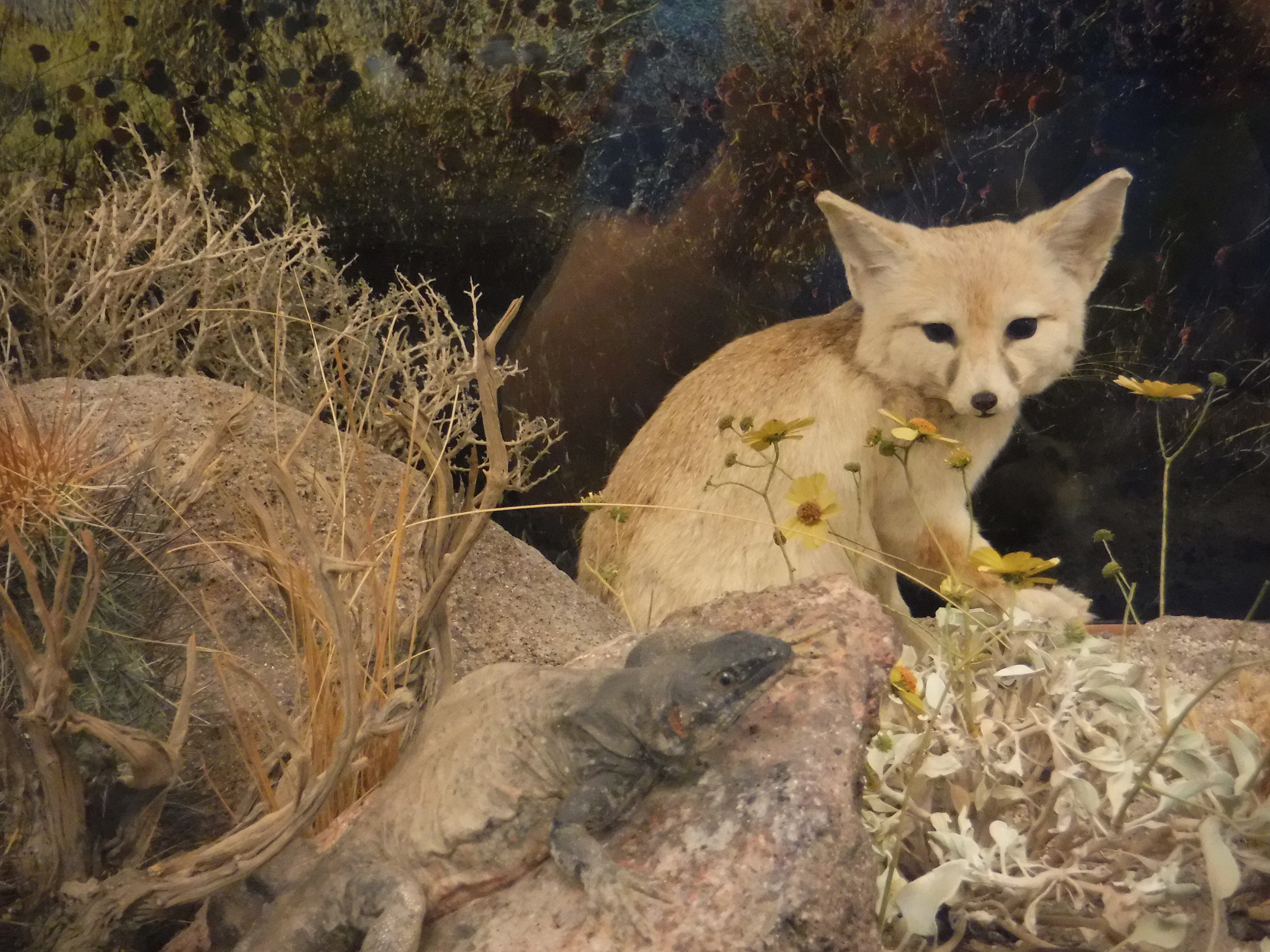
Kit fox habitat in Coast to Cactus installation

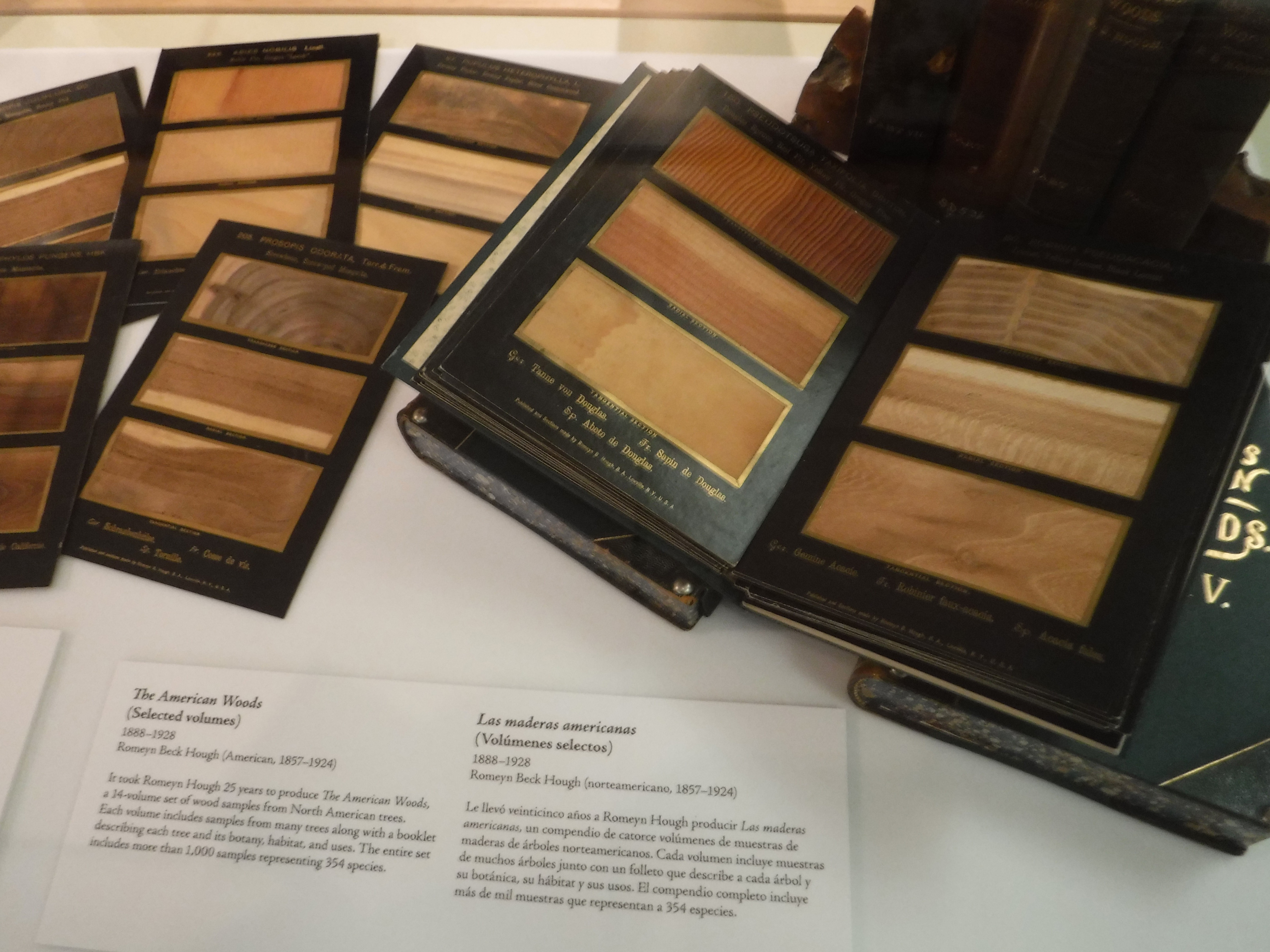
Romeyn Beck Hough, books of American Woods from the Extraordinary Ideas installation

Fossil Mysteries is a highly interactive exhibition tracing the 75-million-year fossil-rich prehistory of southern California and Baja California, Mexico. With a large display of fossils, dioramas, murals, models, and interactives, the exhibition chronicles evolution, extinction, ecology, and Earth processes from the age of the dinosaurs to the Ice Ages.

The 2015 installation of Coast to Cactus in Southern California highlights the region's biodiversity. The permanent exhibition was honored by the American Alliance of Museums' "Overall Excellence for an Exhibition" recognition in June 2016.

In 2016, the museum renovated space in the Research Library to create the Eleanor and Jerome Navarra Special Collections Gallery, which contains the new permanent exhibition, Extraordinary Ideas From Ordinary People: A History of Citizen Science. Extraordinary Ideas received Honorable Mention in the 2017 AAM exhibition competition.

In 2017, the museum drew on the abundance of material in its collections to create the new exhibition, Unshelved – Cool Stuff from Storage. Specimens curated by the several departments that comprise the Biodiversity Research Center of the Californias (BRCC) contributed. Meticulously preserved and catalogued material from the research collections of Birds and Mammals, Botany, Entomology, Herpetology, Marine Invertebrates, Mineralogy, Paleontology, and the Research Library provides a "backstage" view into the museum's remarkable holdings.

=== Other notable exhibitions ===
In 2003, the museum presented a major showing of paintings from its collection in the exhibition Plant Portraits: The California Legacy of A.R. Valentien. The exhibition, created in collaboration with the Irvine Museum, displayed 80 of the museum's 1092 watercolors of California plants painted in the early 1900s by Albert R. Valentien. Winner of the 2004 Western Museums Association Excellence in Exhibition Award, the Valentien show toured museums in the United States through 2009.

In 2007–2008 a collection of the Dead Sea Scrolls were on display, ten of them being shown for the first time in public. The show's attendance was close to 400,000 visitors, a record for any exhibit at the museum.

== Research ==
The museum serves as the major biodiversity repository in the region, conducting field research across a range of scientific disciplines and providing an important source of flora and fauna distributional data for environmental systems protection, land use planning, environmental surveys, and development mitigation.

=== Biodiversity Research Center of the Californias ===
The museum and its research unit, the Biodiversity Research Center of the Californias (BRCC), conduct biological expeditions and field research in Southern California and on the Baja California peninsula, bringing together scientists from various disciplines and fostering collaboration between participating institutions in the United States and Mexico. The expeditions also support the enhancement of the institutions' scientific collections, conservation efforts, management of natural resources, and environmental education. The BRCC was established in 2002 to focus research and collections on regional biology, biodiversity, and geology. Representative expeditions include the 2013–2016 Sierra Cacachilas biodiversity study (which resulted in the discovery of a new species of spider, Califorctenus cacachilensis), a status survey of the flora and fauna of Isla Guadalupe (2000), the Agua Verde and Punta Mechudo (2003) expedition (a binational, multidisciplinary expedition explored the southern end of the Sierra de La Giganta), and the 1997 study of the Sierra San Francisco and the Sierra Guadalupe, located in northern Baja California Sur on the eastern edge of the Vizcaíno Desert. The San Jacinto Resurvey, conducted by the museum in cooperation with the Universities of California, Berkeley and Riverside from 2008 to 2010, retraced the 1908 expedition of Joseph Grinnell and associates to the San Jacinto Mountains in Riverside County to make a detailed comparison of how the region's wildlife changed over the century. The Flying Squirrel Study, with support from the U.S. Fish & Wildlife Service, the U.S. Forest Service, James San Jacinto Mountain Reserve, UCNRS, and the Big Bear Zoo, was launched to determine the distribution and habitat use of the San Bernardino Flying Squirrel (Glaucomys sabrinus californicus) and incorporates the iNaturalist platform to allow citizen scientists to upload their observations to databases used by scientists.

=== Research Departments ===
Current research is conducted by the museum's departments of Birds and Mammals, Botany, Entomology, Herpetology, and Paleontology. In addition, the departments of Marine Invertebrates and Mineralogy house significant collections regularly consulted by scientists.

==== Birds and Mammals ====
Started with the collection of pioneer mammalogist Frank Stephens, acquired in 1910, the department's taxonomic coverage now includes 90% of the world's bird families and 58% of its mammal families, with the museum's holdings extended by its status as a repository for specimens from the San Diego Zoo. Field work by the department has resulted in the publication of two major regional distribution and identification guides, The San Diego County Bird Atlas (2004), and The San Diego County Mammal Atlas (2017). Recent work includes study of environmental pressure on Southern California bird populations.

==== Botany ====
The Botany Department actively collects in San Diego County and Baja California, and its herbarium houses a research collection of 250,000 specimens of native and naturalized plants of the southwestern United States and northwestern Mexico. The collection consists primarily of vascular plants, with significant holdings of marine algae, mostly of the eastern North Pacific. The collection is particularly rich in specimens of the Crassulaceae and Cactaceae. Recent work includes research on floristic diversity in the southwestern United States and northwestern Baja California. The Botany Department provides online access to records via two portals, the Flora of Baja California and the San Diego County Plant Atlas, with most specimens georeferenced. In addition, the Botany Department has fully indexed and published online the field books of botanist Reid Moran.

==== Entomology ====
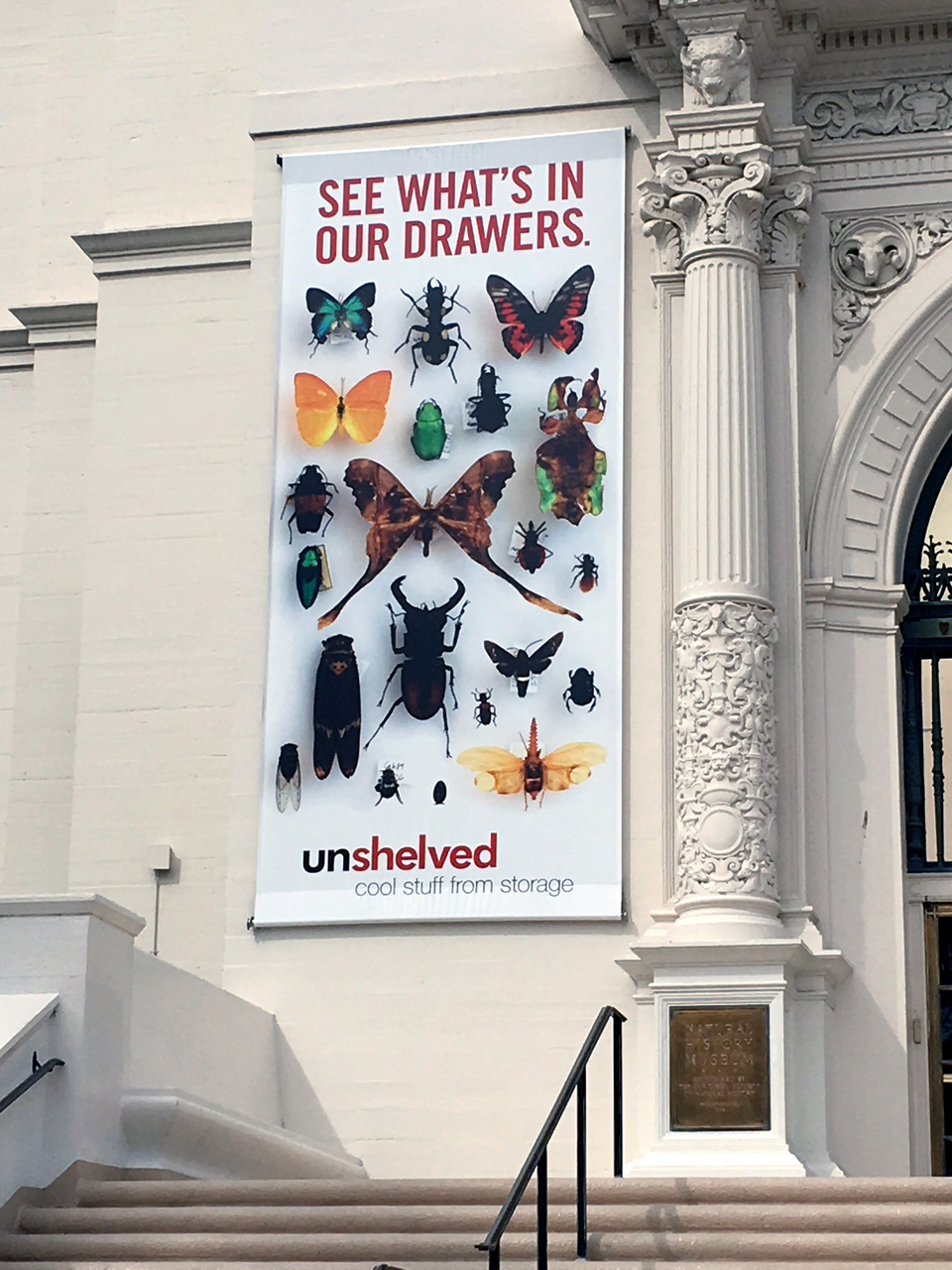
Exterior of theNat, with banner for the exhibition "Unshelved: Cool Stuff from Storage."

The collections of the Entomology Department include over 900,000 specimens. The insect collection is especially strong in Coleoptera and Lepidoptera; smaller but important holdings include Diptera, Hymenoptera, and Neuroptera. The type collection includes over 200 primary types and 500 paratypes with particular strength in Lepidoptera and Coleoptera. There are also 15 holotypes of Arachnids, mostly tarantulas. The collections are regularly used by the county's departments of Agriculture and Environmental Health, the Medical Examiner's Office, the U.S. Fish and Wildlife Service, and private environmental consultants.

==== Herpetology ====
The Herpetology Department houses over 76,000 catalogued specimens, including one of the largest rattlesnake collections in the world. Both regional and worldwide species are well represented in the collection, with specimens from throughout the southwest United States, northwest Mexico, and islands globally. The department hosts the Amphibian and Reptile Atlas of Peninsular California documenting biodiversity research using both Museum collection data and field observations from citizen scientists. In addition, the department makes search of its collection available via online databases.

==== Marine Invertebrates ====
The Marine Invertebrates Department holds approximately 5 million specimens concentrated on mollusks and crustaceans of southern California, Baja California, and the eastern Pacific, with 134 primary and 700 secondary type specimens.

==== Mineralogy ====
The Mineralogy Department maintains 26,000 catalogued specimens of minerals, meteorites, and precious gems, including an extensive collection from southern California and a synoptic collection from around the world.

==== Paleontology ====
The collections of the Paleontology Department include fossil vertebrates, invertebrates, and plants primarily of Mesozoic- through Cenozoic-age sites in southern California and northern Baja California, Mexico. The PaleoServices unit assists in the collection and curation of paleontological fossils from land designated for development and provides consulting services such as paleontological resource assessment of properties and paleontological mitigation plans. The department maintains an online paleontology database of more than 137,000 species lots representing 1.4 million specimens, primarily from the southern California and northern Baja California, Mexico regions. Recent work by the department has included radiometric dating of the Cerutti Mastodon site.

==== Research Library ====
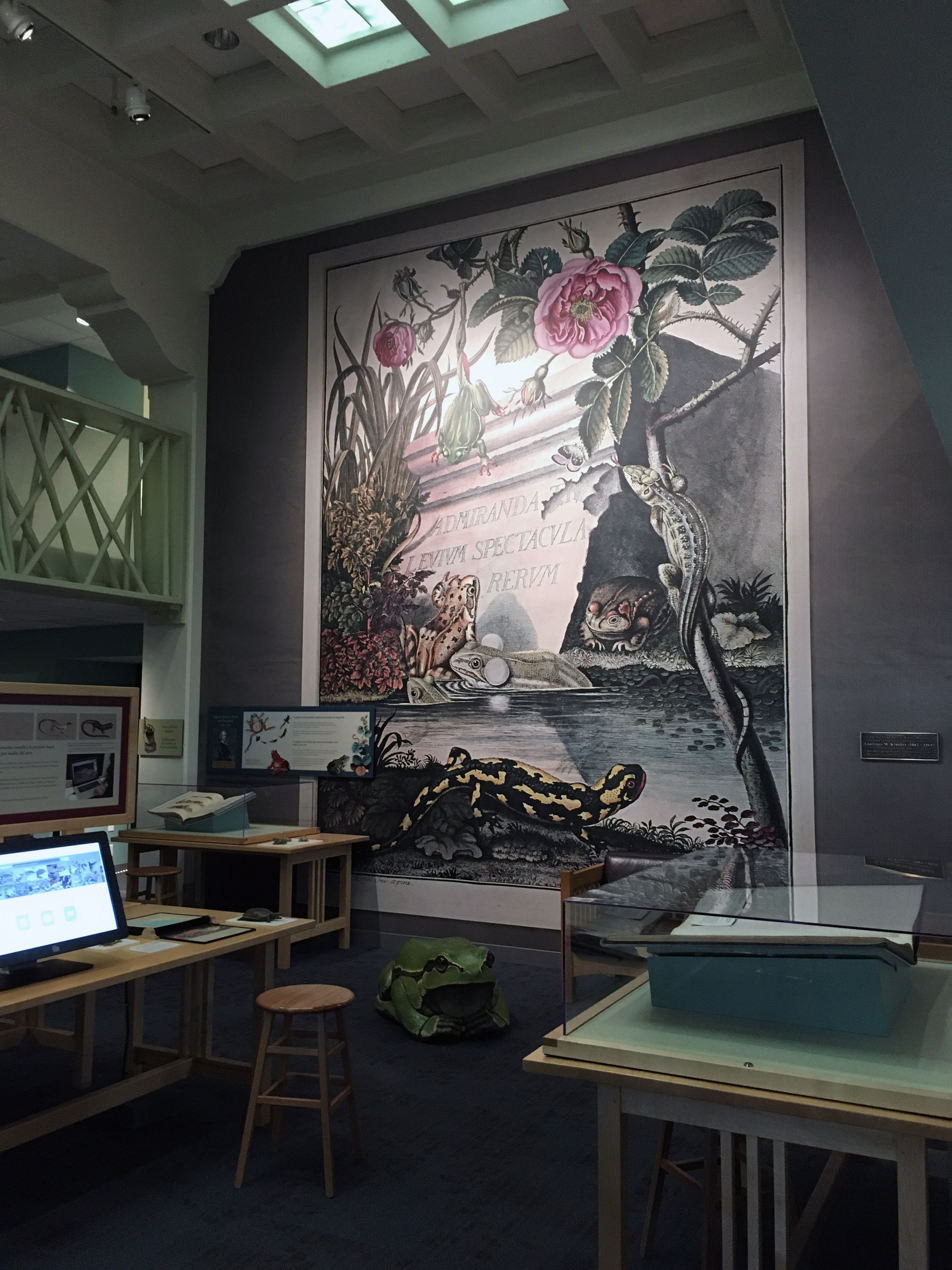
Extraordinary Ideas from Ordinary People: A History of Citizen Science. San Diego Natural History Museum Research Library.

Library collections include a complete natural history reference library, the rare book collection, the Klauber Herpetology Library, and the map collection. In addition, the Library's art collection includes treasures such as the botanical watercolors of A. R. Valentien and wildlife paintings by George Miksch Sutton and Allan Brooks. The Library's archives include a large collection of historical photographs and many important field notes collections, such as those of herpetologist Laurence Klauber (available online at the Internet Archive), mammalogists Frank Stephens and Laurence M. Huey (available at the Internet Archive), and naturalist Charles Russell Orcutt. The library director curates the museum's permanent exhibition Extraordinary Ideas from Ordinary People: A History of Citizen Science, which draws from the rich resources of the library's varied collections.

==== San Diego Zooarchaeology Laboratory ====
The San Diego Zooarchaeology Laboratory (SDZL) identifies faunal assemblages from archaeological sites in San Diego County, the western United States, and the ancient Near East, referencing the San Diego Natural History Museum's scientific collections. Founded in 2010, the SDZL collections include over 46,000 bird specimens and 22,650 mammals. With 7,000 complete bird skeletons, and over 1,400 partial skeletons, the collections contain 90% of bird families worldwide, represented by 1,605 species. Over 1,000 complete mammal skeletons and 20,000 skulls are currently housed, and the collections continue to grow. In-house scholars provide expertise in the specialities of paleontology, marine invertebrates, entomology, herpetology, and botany. Providing interpretation and perspective on the use of animals in antiquity, the SDZL collects and documents zooarchaeological information (specimens and literature) for use by the scientific community, fosters cooperative research, and communicates with the public about zooarchaeological research in the region. In addition, the SDZL provides training to students and volunteers in zooarchaeological techniques and methods.

=== Publications ===
The museum's refereed scientific publications date back to 1905, reflecting the long history of the San Diego Society of Natural History as a leader in research of the geologic past and present biodiversity of western North America and beyond. All of the museum's scientific publications are available online. The journal Transactions of San Diego Society of Natural History preceded the currently published Proceedings of the San Diego Society of Natural History as the museum's major scientific publication. In-depth volumes of Memoirs have treated topics comprehensively, while shorter works, often written for a more general non-technical audience, have been published as Occasional Papers. In addition, the museum has published the magazines Environment Southwest and Field Notes. The museum maintains online atlas projects including the binational Amphibian and Reptile Atlas of Peninsular California and the Plant Atlas of San Diego County. Recent publications include the Bird Atlas of San Diego County (2004), the Checklist of the Vascular Plants of San Diego County (2014, 5th ed.), and the Mammal Atlas of San Diego County (2017).
