= Judy Gradwohl =

American executive

Judy Gradwohl is an American non-profit executive who serves as president and CEO of the San Diego Natural History Museum. In 2016, Gradwohl became the first woman to serve in this role in the museum's 150-year history. During her tenure, the museum has transitioned from traveling to in-house exhibitions, shifted its strategic focus toward applied conservation research, and developed new curricula blending onsite, online, and nature-based activities.

Under Gradwohl's leadership, the museum received an $800,000 grant in 2024 from the Gordon and Betty Moore Foundation to launch a statewide initiative to coordinate and enhance environmental equity research in California's three major urban centers by promoting citizen science, in which residents are invited to contribute to data collection and analysis. Partners include the Natural History Museum of Los Angeles County, San Francisco's California Academy of Sciences, and the University of California, Berkeley.

== Education ==
Gradwohl attended the University of California, Berkeley, where she received an undergraduate fellowship to study the behavior of tropical birds at the Smithsonian Tropical Research Institute on Barro Colorado Island in Panama. This research served the basis of both her bachelor's and master's degrees in zoology.

== Career ==
Beginning her career at the National Zoo, Gradwohl served in a number of different roles at the Smithsonian Institution from 1985 to 2016, eventually becoming the MacMillan Associate Director for Education and Public Engagement at the National Museum of American History. In addition to curating major traveling exhibits on tropical forest and ocean conservation, she was responsible for developing the Smithsonian's first website and establishing its Office of Environmental Awareness.

Gradwohl is an alumna of the Museum Leadership Institute at Claremont Graduate University and the Noyce Leadership Institute. In 2018, she was the recipient of a fellowship to attend Harvard Business School's “Strategic Perspectives in Nonprofit Management” executive education program. From 2020 to 2023, Gradwohl served on the Aspen Institute's Science & Society Program Advisory Council.

=== Books ===
Gradwohl, J. and R. Greenberg. (1988). Saving the Tropical Forests. Earthscan, London, UK.

Gradwohl, J. (1988). Tropical Rainforests: A Disappearing Treasure. Smithsonian Institution, Washington, DC.

Weber, M.L. and J.A. Gradwohl. (1995). The Wealth of Oceans: Environment and Development on Our Ocean Planet. W.W. Norton & Company, New York.

Benchley, P. and J. Gradwohl. (1995). Ocean Planet: Writings and Images of the Sea. Smithsonian Institution, Washington, DC.
