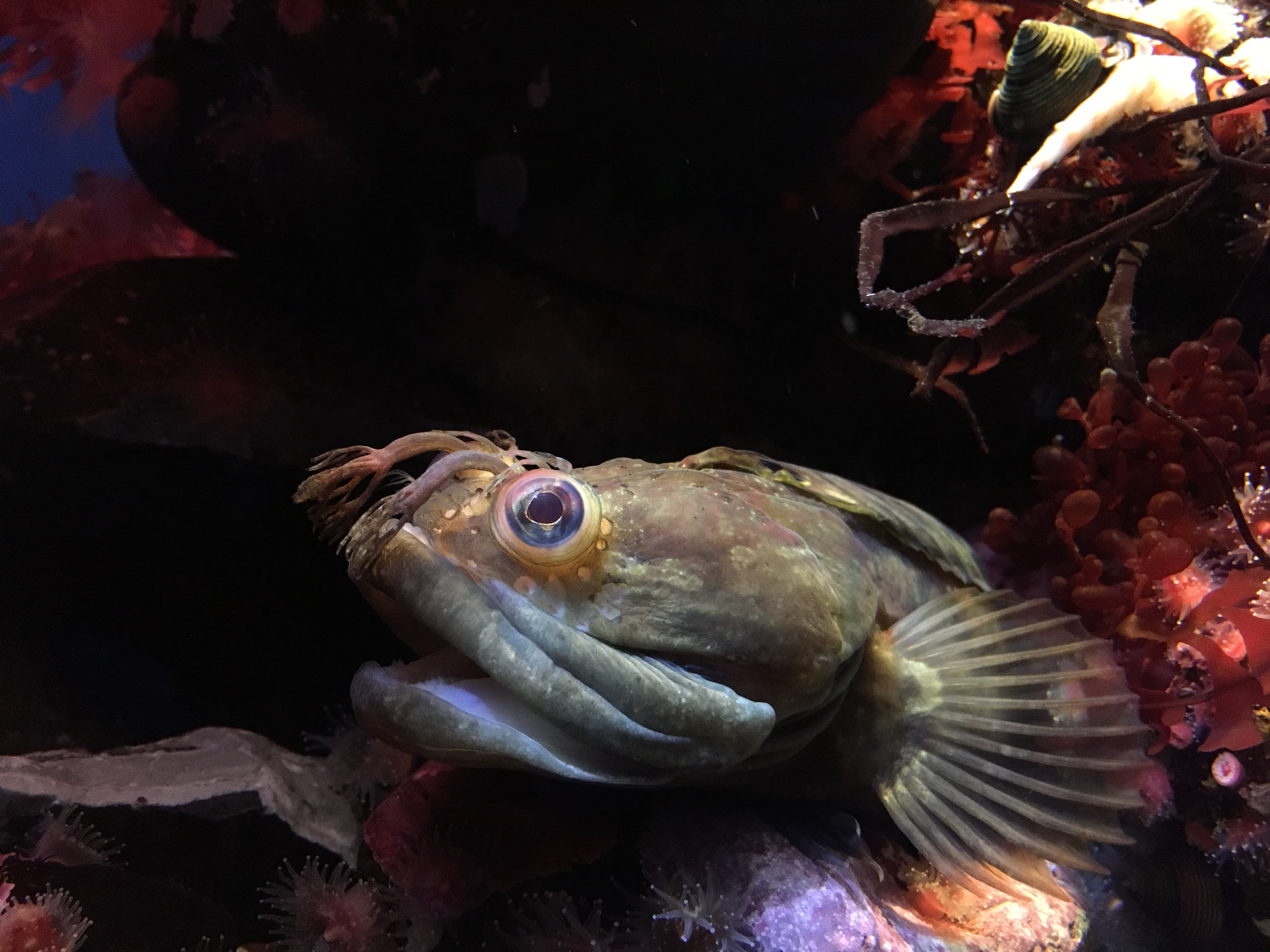

Conservation status
- Least Concern (IUCN 3.1)

Scientific classification
- Kingdom: Animalia
- Phylum: Chordata
- Class: Actinopterygii
- Order: Blenniiformes
- Family: Chaenopsidae
- Genus: Neoclinus
- Species: N. uninotatus

Binomial name
- Neoclinus uninotatus C. Hubbs, 1953

= Neoclinus uninotatus =

Species of fish

Neoclinus uninotatus, the onespot fringehead, is a species of chaenopsid blenny found in the eastern Pacific ocean. It can reach a maximum length of 25 centimetres (9.8 in) TL. This species feeds primarily on benthic crustaceans. It has been known to live for up to 7 years.
