= Peter Grathwohl =

German geologist and expert in hydrology and environmental processes

- Born: 1958 (age 67–68); Sigmaringen, Germany.
- Occupation: Geologist
- Employer: University of Tübingen
- Website: "Personal website at the Center for Applied Geoscience".

Peter Grathwohl (born 1958) is a German geologist and expert in hydrology and environmental processes. 1996 he was appointed a full professor of hydrogeochemistry at the University of Tübingen, Germany. From 2014 to 2025, he was vice-president of research, innovation and transfer of the University of Tübingen. Since 2025 he is senior professor at the Geo- Environmental Center in the Faculty of Science.

== Life ==
Grathwohl was born in Sigmaringen, Germany. He studied Geology at the University of Tübingen. After his diploma 1985 he finished his doctorate in 1988. From 1989 to 1990, he worked as a postdoctoral researcher at Stanford University. In 1990 he returned to Germany and built up a research group and laboratories for geochemistry at the Center of Applied Geosciences, Tübingen University, and in 1996 he was appointed to the rank of a full professor of hydrogeochemistry. From 1997 to 2000, he served as secretary of the section “hydrology and chemical processes” of the European Geophysical Union. 1997-2003 he was member of the scientific advisory committee for soil protection of the Federal Government of Germany and since 2005 he has been in the soil protection commission of the German Federal Environmental Protection Agency. From 2006 to 2010 Grathwohl served as dean of the geoscience faculty of Tübingen University, and was vice-dean of the newly-created faculty of sciences from 2010 to 2014. In 2015, he was elected as a member of the senate of the German Research Foundation (DFG). 2006-2010 he chaired the section of hydrogeology of the German Geological Society. 2000-2010 he was chair of the standardization committee "Leaching Tests" in the Deutsches Institut für Normung (German Institute for Standardization, DIN, NAW). Since 2024 he supports the National Citizen's Oversight Committee as expert in the search of a repository for highly radioactive waste in Germany.

== Research ==
Grathwohl´s research interests focus on fate and transport of persistent organic pollutants in water, air, soils, and sediments. In applied geosciences he worked on contaminated site assessment and groundwater remediation techniques and developed standards for aqueous leaching of waste materials and the monitoring of atmospheric deposition of persistent organic pollutants. In his career, he managed numerous national and international joint research projects funded by the European Union, the German Federal Government and the German Research Foundation.

== Awards ==
- Karl Heinrich Heitfeld Prize for Applied Geosciences, 2004

== Publications ==
- Röhler, K., Haluska, A.A., Susset, B., Liu, B., Grathwohl, P. (2021). Long-term leaching of PFAS from contaminated agricultural soils in Germany. J. Cont. Hydrol., 241, DOI 10.1016/j.jconhyd.2021.103812
- Nasrabadi T., Ruegner H., Schwientek M., Bennett J., Fazel Valipour S., Grathwohl P. (2018). Bulk metal concentrations versus total suspended solids in rivers: Time-invariant & catchment-specific relationships. PLoS ONE 13(1): e0191314. https://doi.org/10.1371/journal.pone.0191314
- Seidensticker, S., Zarfl, C., Cirpka, O., Fellenberg, G., Grathwohl, P. (2017). Shift in mass transfer of wastewater contaminants from microplastics in the presence of dissolved substances. Environ. Sci. Technol., 51, 12254–12263
- Schwientek, M., Rügner, H., Scherer, U., Rode, M., Grathwohl, P. (2017). A parsimonious approach to estimate PAH concentrations in river sediments of anthropogenically impacted watersheds. Science of the Total Environment, 636-645, DOI: 10.1016/j.scitotenv.2017.05.208
- Bao, Z. Haberer, C., Maier, U., Beckingham, B., Amos, R.T., Grathwohl, P. (2016). Modeling short-term concentration fluctuations of semi-volatile pollutants in the soil–plant–atmosphere system. Science of the Total Environment 569-570, 159-167
- Schwientek, M., Guillet, G., Rügner, H., Kuch, B., Grathwohl, P. (2015). A high-precision sampling scheme to assess persistence and transport characteristics of micropollutants in rivers. Sci. Total Environ., 540, 444-454
- Liu, Y., Beckingham, B., Rügner, H., Li, Z., Ma, L., Schwientek, M., Xie, H., Zhao, J., Grathwohl, P. (2013). Comparison of sedimentary PAHs in the Rivers of Ammer (Germany) and Liangtan (China): Differences between early- and newly industrialized countries. Environ. Sci. Technol., 47, 701-709
- Wang, G., Kleineidam, S., Grathwohl, P. (2007). Sorption/desorption reversibility of phenanthrene in soils and carbonaceous materials. Environ. Sci. Technol. 41, 1186-1193
- Kleineidam, S., Rügner, H., Ligouis, B., Grathwohl, P. (1999). Organic matter facies and equilibrium sorption of phenanthrene. Environ. Sci. Technol. 33, 1637-1644
- Grathwohl, P., Reinhard, M. (1993). Desorption of Trichloroethylene in aquifer material: Rate limitation at the grain scale. Environ. Sci. Technol., 27, 12, 2360-2366
