= Ilse Gradwohl =

Mexican painter (born 1943)

Ilse Gradwohl (born 1943 in Gleisdorf, Austria) is a Mexican painter. She was born in Austria, but moved to Mexico in 1973, where she studied art at the National Autonomous University of Mexico (UNAM). In 1996 she had a solo exhibition at the Museo de Arte Moderno in Mexico City entitled Mnesis.
