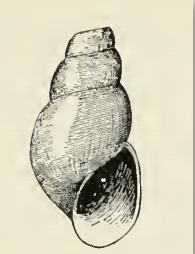
- Apertural view of a shell of Odostomia tenuisculpta

Scientific classification
- Kingdom: Animalia
- Phylum: Mollusca
- Class: Gastropoda
- Family: Pyramidellidae
- Genus: Odostomia
- Species: O. tenuisculpta

Binomial name
- Odostomia tenuisculpta Carpenter, 1864

Synonyms
- Evalea tenuisculpta (Carpenter, 1864); Odostomia amchitkana Dall and Bartsch, 1909; Odostomia baranoffensis Dall and Bartsch, 1909; Odostomia clesseni Dall and Bartsch, 1909; Odostomia jewetti Dall & Bartsch, 1907; Odostomia kadiahkensis Dall and Bartsch, 1909; Odostomia obesa Dall and Bartsch, 1909; Odostomia phanea Dall and Bartsch, 1907; Odostomia santarosana Dall and Bartsch, 1909; Odostomia socorroensis Dall and Bartsch, 1909; Odostomia straminea Carpenter, 1865; Odostomia (Evalea) tenuisculpta Carpenter, 1864; Odostomia (Evalea) tillamookensis Dall & Bartsch, 1907

= Odostomia tenuisculpta =

Species of gastropod

Odostomia tenuisculpta is a species of sea snail, a marine gastropod mollusc in the family Pyramidellidae, the pyrams and their allies.

== Description ==
The yellowish shell has an elongate-ovate shape with the early whorls spirally lirate and the later ones only obsoletely so. Its length measures 5.6 mm. The whorls of the protoconch are small, smooth, obliquely, almost completely, immersed in the first of the succeeding turns. The six whorls of the teleoconch are evenly well-rounded with appressed summits. The first three are marked between the sutures by many subequal lirae of which there are about fifteen on the second turn. On the last two turns these lirations become quite obsolete. The periphery and the base of the body whorl are inflated and well rounded. They are marked by very feeble spiral striations and lines of growth. The oval aperture is moderately large, somewhat effuse anteriorly. The posterior angle is acute. The outer lip is thin. The columella is strongly curved, reinforced partly by the attenuated base, moderately reflected anteriorly. It bears a strong fold at its insertion, which appears as if it were the inflected termination of the columella.

== Distribution ==
This species occurs in the Pacific Ocean from Washington (state) to California. The southern representatives were identified by G.W. Tryon as Odostomia straminea Carpenter.
