= List of works titled after Shakespeare =

The following is a list of titles of works taken from Shakespearean phrases. This is not the place to list film or television adaptations of Shakespeare's plays; the List of William Shakespeare screen adaptations exists for that purpose.

== Antony and Cleopatra ==
- Perhaps from "Then must thou needs find out new heaven, new Earth" (I.i – but cf. also Revelation 21):
  - New Heaven, New Earth: The Visionary Experience in Literature by Joyce Carol Oates
- An Inch of Fortune by Simon Raven (I.ii)
- From "My salad days / When I was green in judgment" (I.v):
  See Salad Days (disambiguation)
- Her Infinite Variety by Louis Auchincloss (II.ii)
- Music Ho! by Constant Lambert (II.v)
- Beds in the East by Anthony Burgess (II.vi)
- Gaudy Night by Dorothy L. Sayers (III.xiii)
- Make Death Love Me by Ruth Rendell (III.xiii)
- The Secret House of Death by Ruth Rendell (IV.xv)

== As You Like It ==
- From the title:
  See As You Like It (disambiguation)
- From "Under the greenwood tree" (II.v):
  - Under the Greenwood Tree, 1872 novel by Thomas Hardy
  - Under the Greenwood Tree, 1918 film
  - Under the Greenwood Tree, 1929 film adaptation of Hardy's novel
- From the "All the world's a stage" monologue (II.vii):
  - All the World's a Stage, 1976 album by Rush
  - "All the World's a Stage", 2010 Ugly Betty episode
  - All the World's a Stooge, 1941 short by The Three Stooges
  - "... And All the Stars a Stage", 1960 short story by James Blish
  - All the World's a Grave, 2008 play by John Reed
  - The Seven Ages, 1986 novel by Eva Figes
  - Morning Face, 1968 novel by Mulk Raj Anand
  - Unwillingly to School, 1942 novel by Nora Mylrea
  - Unwillingly to School, 1958 novella by Pauline Ashwell
  - Sans Everything, 1967 non-fiction book by Barbara Robb
- Blow, Blow, Thou Winter Wind, 1892 painting by John Everett Millais
- Most Loving Mere Folly, 1953 novel by Edith Pargeter (Ii.vii)
- The Lie Direct, 1983 novel by Sara Woods (V.iv)

== Coriolanus ==
- From "O! a kiss / Long as my exile" (V.iii):
  - The Exile Kiss by George Alec Effinger

== Hamlet ==
- A Little Less Than Kind by Charlotte Armstrong (I.ii)
- Less Than Kind, 2008 television series (I.ii)
- Too, Too Solid Flesh by Nick O'Donohoe (I.ii)
- The Winds of Heaven by Monica Dickens (I.ii)
- From "The canker galls the infants of the spring" (I.iii):
  - Infants of the Spring, 1932 novel by Wallace Thurman
  - Infants of the Spring, 1976 memoir by Anthony Powell
- Path of Dalliance by Auberon Waugh (I.iii)
- This Above All by Eric Knight (I.iii)
- "Thine Own Self", 1994 Star Trek: The Next Generation episode (I.iii)
- From "to the manner born" (I.iv):
  - To the Manor Born, 1979–1981 television series
- The Glimpses of the Moon by Edith Wharton (I.iv)
- The Glimpses of the Moon by Edmund Crispin (I.iv)
- A Pin's Fee by Peter de Polnay (I.iv)
- Dreadful Summit by Stanley Ellin (I.iv)
- Something Rotten by Jasper Fforde (I.iv)
- From "Murder most foul" (I.v):
  See Murder Most Foul (disambiguation)
- The Celestial Bed by Irving Wallace (I.v)
- From "Leave her to heaven" (I.v):
  - Leave Her to Heaven, 1940 play by John Van Druten
  - Leave Her to Heaven, 1944 novel by Ben Ames Williams
  - Leave Her to Heaven, 1945 film of Williams's novel
- And Be a Villain by Rex Stout (I.v)
- From "There are more things in heaven and earth, Horatio, / Than are dreamt of in your philosophy." (I.v)
  - "There Are More Things", 1975 short story by Jorge Luis Borges
  - There Are More Things, 2022 novel by Yara Rodrigues Fowler
  - More Things in Heaven, 1973 novel by John Brunner
- From "The time is out of joint" (I.v):
  - Time Out of Joint by Philip K. Dick
- From "Though this be madness, yet there is method in't" (II.ii):
  - Method — Or Madness?, 1957 lecture series by Robert Lewis
  - Method to the Maadness, 2010 album by Kano
  - Method to the Madness of Jerry Lewis, 2011 documentary film
- Her Privates We by Frederic Manning (II.ii); also published as The Middle Parts of Fortune: Somme and Ancre, 1916, referring to the same section of II.ii: "On fortune's cap we are not the very button ... Then you live about her waist, or in the middle of her favours?"
- From "I could be bounded in a nutshell, and count myself a king of infinite space" (II.ii):
  - Nutshell, 2016 novel by Ian McEwan
  - Kings of Infinite Space, 1967 novel by Nigel Balchin
  - Kings of Infinite Space, 2004 novel by James Hynes
- How Like an Angel by Margaret Millar (II.ii)
- How Like a God by Brenda Clough (II.ii)
- "The Paragon of Animals", 1998 Babylon 5 episode (II.ii)
- His Picture in Little, artwork by Tacita Dean (II.ii)
- Said to be from "I am but mad north-northwest" (II.ii):
  - North by Northwest, 1959 film by Alfred Hitchcock
- Cue for Passion, play by Elmer Rice (II.ii)
- "The Conscience of the King", 1966 Star Trek episode (II.ii)
- From the "To be, or not to be" soliloquy (III.i):
  See To Be or Not to Be (disambiguation)
  - Slings & Arrows, 2003 Showcase Original Series
  - Outrageous Fortune, 1987 film written by Leslie Dixon
  - Outrageous Fortune, 2005–2010 television series. (Every episode of the series also took its title from a Shakespearean quotation.)
  - The Thousand Natural Shocks by Char March
  See Perchance to Dream (disambiguation)
  - There's the Rub, 1974 album by Wishbone Ash
  - "There's the Rub", 2002 Gilmore Girls episode
  See What Dreams May Come (disambiguation)
  See Mortal coil (disambiguation)
  - With a Bare Bodkin by Cyril Hare
  - The Undiscovered Country, 1991 Star Trek film
  - No Traveller Returns by John Collier
  - The Name of Action by Graham Greene
  - Be All My Sins Remember'd, 2008 Stargate: Atlantis episode
  - All My Sins Remembered by Joe Haldeman
- From "I was the more deceived" (III.i):
  - The Less Deceived, poem by Philip Larkin
- "The Chameleon's Dish", a song from In Visible Silence by Art of Noise (III.ii)
- The Mousetrap, 1952 play by Agatha Christie (III.ii)
- Poison in Jest by John Dickson Carr (III.ii)
- Begin, Murderer by Desmond Cory (III.ii)
- "Very Like A Whale", poem by Ogden Nash (III.ii)
- Contagion to This World by John Lodwick (III.ii)
- Flush As May by P. M. Hubbard (III.iii)
- The King of Shreds and Patches, an interactive fiction by Jimmy Maher inspired by H. P. Lovecraft (from "A king of shreds and patches", III.iv)
- From "I must be cruel only to be kind" (III.iv):
  "Cruel to Be Kind", 1979 song by Nick Lowe
  "Cruel to Be Kind", 1995 song by Spacehog
- The Owl Was a Baker's Daughter: Obesity, Anorexia Nervosa, and the Repressed Feminine by Marion Woodman (IV.v)
- Goodnight, Sweet Ladies by Shamus Frazer (IV.v)
- Single Spies by Alan Bennett (IV.v)
- O, How the Wheel Becomes It by Anthony Powell (IV.v)
- The Herb of Grace by Elizabeth Goudge (IV.v)
- No Wind of Blame by Georgette Heyer (IV.vii)
- First Gravedigger by Barbara Paul (V.i)
- From "Alas, poor Yorick!" (V.i):
  - Alas! Poor Yorick!, 1913 film starring Fatty Arbuckle
  - "Alas, Poor Maling", 1940 short story by Graham Greene
  - Alas Poor Yagan, 1997 editorial cartoon by Dean Alston
- Infinite Jest by David Foster Wallace (V.i)
- Infinite Jest, album by We Are The Fury (V.i)
- Paint an Inch Thick by Adam Dompierre (V.i)
- The Quick and the Dead, 1995 film by Sam Raimi (V.i)
- From "the rest is silence" (V.ii):
  See The Rest Is Silence (disambiguation)
- From "Rosencrantz and Guildernstern are dead" (V.ii):
  - Rosencrantz and Guildenstern Are Dead, 1966 play by Tom Stoppard
  - Rosencrantz and Guildenstern Are Dead, 1990 film adaptation of Stoppard's play
  - "Roz's Krantz & Gouldenstein Are Dead", 1997 Frasier episode
  - Rosencrantz and Guildenstern Are Undead, 2009 film by Jordan Galland
- Put on By Cunning by Ruth Rendell (V.ii)
- Bid the Soldiers Shoot by John Lodwick (V.ii)

== Henry IV, Part 1 ==
- Tarry and Be Hanged by Sara Woods (I.ii)
- I Know a Trick Worth Two of That by Samuel Holt (pseudonym for Donald E. Westlake) (II.i)
- Time Must Have a Stop by Aldous Huxley (V.iv)

== Henry IV, Part 2 ==
- Loosely based on "Uneasy lies the head that wears a crown" (III.i):
  See Heavy Is the Head (disambiguation) and Heavy Lies the Crown (disambiguation)
- Chimes at Midnight, 1965 film by Orson Welles (III.ii)
- Chimes at Midnight by Seanan McGuire (III.ii)

== Henry V ==
- One Salt Sea, 2011 novel by Seanan McGuire (I.ii)
- So Vile a Sin, 1997 novel by Ben Aaronovitch and Kate Orman (II.iv)
- From "Once more unto the breach, dear friends, once more" (III.i):
  - "Once More unto the Breach", 1998 Star Trek: Deep Space Nine episode
  - Once More Unto the Breach, 2019 film
  - Unto the Breach, 2006 novel by John Ringo
  - Once More into the Bleach, 1988 album by Debbie Harry and Blondie
- From the St Crispin's Day Speech (IV.iii):
  - Household Words, magazine edited by Charles Dickens
  - We Few, 2005 novel by David Weber and John Ringo
  - We Happy Few, 2016 video game

== Henry VI, Part 1 ==
- Bring Forth the Body by Simon Raven (II.ii)

== Henry VI, Part 2 ==
- The Main Chance, 1969–1975 television series (I.i)

== Henry VI, Part 3 ==
- Once Broken Faith by Seanan McGuire (IV.iv)

== Henry VIII ==
- From the alternative title:
  - All Is True, 2018 film
- The Long Divorce by Edmund Crispin (II.i)
- A Killing Frost by R. D. Wingfield (III.ii)
- The Third Day, The Frost by John Marsden (III.ii)
- Ashes of Honor by Seanan McGuire (V.v)

== Julius Caesar ==
- "Beware the Ides of March", song by Colosseum (I.ii)
  See also Ides of March (disambiguation)
- From "The fault, dear Brutus, is not in our stars, / But in ourselves" (I.ii):
  - The Fault in Our Stars, 2012 novel by John Green
  - Dear Brutus, 1917 play by J. M. Barrie
- From "think him as a serpent's egg, / Which, hatched, would, as his kind, grow mischievous" (II.i):
  See The Serpent's Egg (disambiguation)
- Messengers of Day, 1978 memoir by Anthony Powell (II.i)
- This Little Measure, 1964 novel by Sara Woods (III.i)
- From "Cry 'Havoc!' and let slip the dogs of war" (III.i; "cry havoc" also appears in Coriolanus, III.i, and King John, II.i):
  See Cry havoc (disambiguation) and The Dogs of War (disambiguation)
- From the speech "Friends, Romans, countrymen, lend me your ears" (III.ii):
  - Friends, Voters, Countrymen, 2001 book by Boris Johnson
  See also Lend Me Your Ears (disambiguation)
  - "Not to Praise Him", 2002 episode of The Bill
  See also The Evil That Men Do (disambiguation)
- "The Hollow Men", 1925 poem by T. S. Eliot (IV.ii)
- "There is a Tide", 1968 short story by Larry Niven (IV.iii)
- Taken at the Flood, 1948 novel by Agatha Christie (IV.iii; also known as There is a Tide, from the same passage)
- On Such a Full Sea, 2014 novel by Chang-Rae Lee (IV.iii)

== King John ==
- From "To gild refined gold, to paint the lily" (II.ii):
  See Gilded Lily (disambiguation)
- Twice-Told Tales by Charles Dickens (III.iv)
- Twice-Told Tales by Nathaniel Hawthorne (III.iv)
- Twice-Told Tales, 1963 film (III.iv)
- Twice Told Tales, 2015 album by 10,000 Maniacs
- From "Heaven take my soul, and England keep my bones" (IV.iii):
  - England Have My Bones by T. H. White
  - England Keep My Bones, 2011 album by Frank Turner

== King Lear ==
- Words of Love by Pearl S. Buck (I.i)
- Late Eclipses by Seanan McGuire (I.ii)
- If We Were Villains by M. L. Rio (I.ii)
- From "How sharper than a serpent’s tooth it is / To have a thankless child" (I.iv):
  - "How Sharper Than a Serpent's Tooth", 1974 Star Trek animated episode
  - "The Serpent's Tooth", 2000 My Family episode
- "A Father's Curse" by Honoré de Balzac (I.iv)
- Faces in My Time by Anthony Powell (II.ii)
- From "I am a man / More sinned against than sinning" (III.ii):
  - "More Spinned Against", short story by John Wyndham
- Act of Darkness by Francis King (III.iv.93)
- From "Child Rowland to the dark tower came" (III.iv.195):
  - "Childe Roland to the Dark Tower Came", poem by Robert Browning
  See The Dark Tower (disambiguation)
- The Lake of Darkness by Ruth Rendell (III.v)
- Half Way Down by Ryan Patch (IV.vi)
- Every Inch a King by Harry Turtledove (IV.vi)
- From "the small gilded fly does lecher in my sight" (IV.vi):
  - The Case of the Gilded Fly by Edmund Crispin
- From "I am bound / Upon a wheel of fire, that mine own tears / Do scald like molten lead" (IV.vii):
  - The Wheel of Fire: Interpretations of Shakespearian Tragedy by G. Wilson Knight
- Ripeness is All by Eric Linklater (V.ii)
- Full Circle, 1975 novel by Peter Straub (V.iii)
- Full Circle, 1984 novel by Danielle Steel (V.iii)
- Speak What We Feel (Not What We Ought To Say) by Frederick Buechner (V.iii)

== Macbeth ==
- The Battle Lost and Won, 1978 novel by Olivia Manning (I.i)
- Wyrd Sisters by Terry Pratchett (I.iii, etc.)
- The Seeds of Time by John Wyndham (I.iii)
- Mortal Thoughts, 1991 film (I.v)
- The Moon Is Down by John Steinbeck (II.i)
- The Moon Is Down, album by Further Seems Forever (II.i)
- Fatal Vision by Joe McGinniss (II.i)
- Dagger of the Mind by Bob Shaw (II.i)
- Hear not my Steps by L. T. C. Rolt (II.i)
- From "Sleep no more'" (II.ii):
  See Sleep No More (disambiguation)
- From "'tis the eye of childhood / That fears a painted devil." (II.ii):
  - To Fear a Painted Devil, 1965 novel by Ruth Rendell
  - A Painted Devil, 1975 novel by Rachel Billington
- Wash This Blood Clean from My Hand by Fred Vargas (II.ii)
- A Heart So White by Javier Marías (II.ii)
- Look to the Lady by Margery Allingham (II.iii)
- Light Thickens by Ngaio Marsh (III.ii)
- Let It Come Down by Paul Bowles (III.iii)
- From "the air-drawn dagger" (III.iv):
  - Airdrawndagger, 2002 album by Sasha
- Can Such Things Be? by Ambrose Bierce (III.iv)
- Exit Ghost by Philip Roth (III.iv; the stage direction also appears in Hamlet and Julius Caesar, but Roth had the scene with Banquo's ghost in mind.)
- From "Double, double, toil and trouble" (IV.i)
  See Double-double (disambiguation) § Literature and media
  - Toil and Trouble, volume 2 title of the comic book series X-Men Blue
- Fire, Burn! by John Dickson Carr (IV.i)
- Fire Burn and Cauldron Bubble by H. P. Mallory (IV.i)
- A Charm of Powerful Trouble by Joanne Horniman (IV.i)
- By the Pricking of My Thumbs by Agatha Christie (IV.i)
- From "Something wicked this way comes" (IV.i):
  See Something Wicked This Way Comes (disambiguation) and Something Wicked (disambiguation)
- Birnam Wood by Eleanor Catton (IV.i)
- From "until / Great Birnam wood to high Dunsinane hill / Shall come" (IV.i, with variations thereafter)
  - "When Birnam Wood" by Larry Niven (chapter from The Integral Trees)
  - "The Birnam Wood", The West Wing Season 6 episode
- Come Like Shadows by Simon Raven (IV.i)
- In Spite of Thunder by John Dickson Carr (IV.i)
- The Brightest Fell by Seanan McGuire (IV.iii)
- A Rooted Sorrow by P. M. Hubbard (V.iii)
- Taste of Fears by Margaret Millar (V.v)
- From the "Tomorrow, and tomorrow, and tomorrow" soliloquy (V.v):
  See Tomorrow and tomorrow and tomorrow (disambiguation) and Tomorrow and Tomorrow (disambiguation)
  See All Our Yesterdays (disambiguation)
  - The Way to Dusty Death, a 1973 novel by Alistair MacLean
  - Dusty Death, a 1931 novel of drug smuggling by Clifton Robbins
  - "Out, Out—", a 1916 poem by Robert Frost
  - "Out, Out Brief Candle", an episode of Six Feet Under
  - Brief Candles, a collection of short stories by Aldous Huxley.
  - Walking Shadow, published in 1994, is the 21st Spenser novel by Robert B. Parker.
  - Told by an Idiot, a 1923 novel by Rose Macaulay
  - Four Tales Told by an Idiot, a 1979 collection of poems by Ted Hughes
  See Sound and Fury (disambiguation)
  - "Signifying Nothing", a short story in the 1999 collection Brief Interviews with Hideous Men by David Foster Wallace

== Measure for Measure ==
- From the title:
  - Measure for Measure, 1986 album by Icehouse
  - Measure for Murder, 1941 novel by Clifford Witting (III.i)
- "Mortality and Mercy in Vienna", 1959 short story by Thomas Pynchon (I.i)
- A Thirsty Evil, 2013 novel by P. M. Hubbard (I.ii)
- Another Thing to Fall, 2008 novel by Laura Lippman (II.i)
- From "His glassy essence, like an angry ape" (II.ii):
  - Ape and Essence, 1948 novel by Aldous Huxley

== The Merchant of Venice ==
- From the title:
  - The Merchants of Venus, 1972 novella by Frederik Pohl
  - Merchants of Venus, 1998 film
  - The Serpent of Venice, 2014 book by Christopher Moore
- Villain with a Smiling Cheek, 1948 book by Paul Murray (I.iii)
- From "pound of flesh" (III.iii et passim):
  See Pound of Flesh (disambiguation)
- Perhaps from "All that glisters is not gold" (II.vii):
  See All That Glitters (disambiguation)
- Perhaps from "between you and I" (III.ii):
  - Between You and I: A Little Book of Bad English, 2003 book by James Cochrane
  - "Between You & I", 2006 song by Jessica Simpson
  - "Between You & I", 2019 song by Kita Alexander
- From "The quality of mercy is not strained" (IV.i):
  See The Quality of Mercy (disambiguation)
- From "So shines a good deed in a naughty world" (V.i):
  - "A Goon's Deed in a Weary World", 2013 30 Rock episode
- Silver and Lead, 2025 novel by Seanan McGuire (I.ii)

== A Midsummer Night's Dream ==
- From the title:
  See A Midsummer Night's Dream (disambiguation)
- Ill Met by Moonlight, 1950 book by W. Stanley Moss (II.i)
- Ill Met by Moonlight, 1957 film adaptation of Moss's book, by Michael Powell and Emeric Pressburger (II.i)
- Ill Met by Moonlight, 1994 film by S. P. Somtow (II.i)
- "Ill Met by Moonlight", 1996 episode of Gargoyles (II.i)
- Night and Silence by Seanan McGuire (II.ii)
- Bottom's Dream by Arno Schmidt (IV.i)
- A Local Habitation by Seanan McGuire (V.i)

== Much Ado About Nothing ==
- From the title:
  See Much Ado About Nothing (disambiguation)
- From "Sigh no more" (II.iii):
  See Sigh No More (disambiguation)
- Kill Claudio by P. M. Hubbard (IV.i)

== Othello ==
- From "I will wear my heart upon my sleeve" (I.i):
  See Heart on My Sleeve (disambiguation)
- From "the beast with two backs" (I.i):
  See Beast with two backs § See also
- From "passing strange" (I.iii):
  See Passing Strange (disambiguation)
- Nothing if Not Critical by Robert Hughes (II.i)
- From "O, beware, my lord, of jealousy! / It is the green-eyed monster which doth mock / The meat it feeds on" (III.ii.111):
  See Green-Eyed Monster (disambiguation)
- From "Pride, pomp, and circumstance of glorious war!" (III.iii):
  - Pomp and Circumstance Marches, orchestral marches by Edward Elgar
  - Pomp and Circumstance, novel by Noël Coward
- From "mortal engines" (III.iii):
  See Mortal Engines (disambiguation)
- From "journey's end" (V.ii – but cf. also Twelfth Night, II.iii):
  See Journey's End (disambiguation)
- Richer Than All His Tribe by Nicholas Monsarrat (V.ii)

== Pericles, Prince of Tyre ==
- Behold, Here's Poison by Georgette Heyer (I.i)

== Richard II ==
- This Sceptred Isle, 1995 radio series on British history
- The Demi-Paradise, 1943 film with Laurence Olivier (II.i)
- This Happy Breed, 1939 play by Noël Coward (II.i)
- This Happy Breed, 1944 film directed by David Lean, based on Coward's play (II.i)
- This Blessed Plot by Hugo Young (II.i)
- Bid Time Return by Richard Matheson (III.ii)
- From "the hollow crown" (III.ii):
  See The Hollow Crown (disambiguation)
- Who Are the Violets Now? by Auberon Waugh (V.ii)

== Richard III ==
- From "Now is the winter of our discontent" (I.i):
  See Winter of Discontent (disambiguation)
- From "where eagles dare" (I.iii):
  See Where Eagles Dare (disambiguation)
- Tomorrow in the Battle Think on Me by Javier Marías (V.iii)
- From "A horse, a horse, my kingdom for a horse!" (V.iv):
  - My Kingdom for a Cook, 1943 film
  - My Kingdom for a Horse, 1988 BBC TV series starring Sean Bean

== Romeo and Juliet ==
- An Artificial Night by Seanan McGuire (I.i)
- The Strangers All Are Gone by Anthony Powell (I.v)
- Deny Thy Father by Jeff Mariotte (II.ii)
- From "What's in a name? That which we call a rose / By any other word would smell as sweet" (II.ii):
  See What's in a Name? (disambiguation)
  - "By Any Other Name", 1968 Star Trek episode
  - A Rose by Any Other Name, 1975 album by Ronnie Milsap
- Inconstant Moon by Larry Niven (II.ii)
- Too Like the Lightning by Ada Palmer (II.ii)
- "Such Sweet Sorrow", ER episode (II.ii)
- Such Tweet Sorrow, Twitter-based adaptation of Romeo and Juliet (II.ii)
- These Violent Delights by Chloe Gong (II.vi)
- Not So Deep as a Well, poem by Dorothy Parker (III.i)
- Both Your Houses, play by Maxwell Anderson (III.i)
- It Was the Nightingale by Ford Madox Ford (III.v)

== The Sonnets ==
- The Darling Buds of May by H. E. Bates (XVIII)
- The Darling Buds of May, TV comedy based on H. E. Bates's novel (XVIII)
- Summer's Lease by John Mortimer (XVIII)
- From "fortune and men's eyes" (XXIX):
  - Fortune and Men's Eyes, 1967 play by John Herbert
  - Fortune and Men's Eyes, 1971 film adaptation of John Herbert's play
  - Fortune and Men's Eyes, 1987 album by Jennifer Caron Hall
- From "heaven's gate" (XXIX):
  See Heaven's Gate (disambiguation)
- Remembrance of Things Past by Marcel Proust (only in English translation; XXX)
- The Pebbled Shore by Elizabeth Longford (LX)
- Where Late the Sweet Birds Sang by Kate Wilhelm (LXXIII)
- Absent in the Spring by Agatha Christie (XCVIII)
- Chronicles of Wasted Time by Malcolm Muggeridge (CVI)
- Nothing Like the Sun by Anthony Burgess (CXXX)
- ...Nothing Like the Sun, album by Sting (CXXX)
- A Waste of Shame, 2005 drama (CXXIX)
- Too Dear for My Possessing by Pamela Hansford Johnson (CXXXVII)
- No More Dying Then by Ruth Rendell (CXLVI)

== The Taming of the Shrew ==
- Kiss Me, Kate, play by Cole Porter (V.i)
  - Kiss Me Kate, 1953 film of Cole Porter's musical (V.i)
- Kiss Me Kate, 2009 EP by Kate Tsui (V.i)
- Kiss Me Kate, 1998–2000 BBC sitcom (V.i)

== The Tempest ==
- Hell Is Empty and All the Devils Are Here, album by Anaal Nathrakh (I.ii)
- Hag-Seed by Margaret Atwood (I.ii)
- From Ariel's Song (I.ii):
  - Come Unto These Yellow Sands, 1842 painting by Richard Dadd
  - Full Fathom Five, 1947 painting by Jackson Pollock
  See Full Fathom Five (disambiguation)
  See Sea change (disambiguation)
  - "Pearls That Were", poem by J. H. Prynne
  - Something Rich and Strange, 1994 novel by Patricia A. McKillip
  - Rich and Strange, 1931 film by Alfred Hitchcock
- From "misery acquaints a man with strange bed-fellows" (II.ii):
  See Strange bedfellows (disambiguation)
- The Isle Is Full of Noises, play by Derek Walcott (III.ii)
- Into Thin Air by Jon Krakauer (IV.i)
- Such Stuff As Screams Are Made Of by Robert Bloch (from "We are such stuff / As dreams are made on", IV.i)
- This Rough Magic by Mary Stewart (V.i)
- Rough Magic, 1995 film with Russell Crowe and Bridget Fonda (V.i)
- Where the Bee Sucks, poetry anthology by Iolo Aneurin Williams (V.i)
- Brave New World by Aldous Huxley (V.i)
- Every Third Thought by John Barth (V.i)

== Timon of Athens ==
- In Cold Blood by Truman Capote (III.v)
- Fools of Fortune by William Trevor (III.vi)
- Fools of Fortune, 1990 film of William Trevor's novel (III.vi)
- Pale Fire by Vladimir Nabokov (IV.iii)

== Titus Andronicus ==
- Gentle People by Irwin Shaw (V.iii)

== Troilus and Cressida ==
- Good Riddance, 1979 film (II.i)
- "Good Riddance (Time of Your Life)", song by Green Day (II.i)
- Alms for Oblivion, series of novels by Simon Raven (III.iii)
- Not the Glory by Pierre Boulle (IV.i)

== Twelfth Night ==
- Or What You Will, 2020 novel by Jo Walton (title)
- The Food Of Love, 2011 novel by Anthony Capella (I.i)
- Present Laughter, play by Noël Coward (II.iii)
- Cakes and Ale by Somerset Maugham (II.iii)
- Sad Cypress by Agatha Christie (II.iv)
- To Play the Fool by Laurie R. King (III.i)
- Improbable Fiction, play by Alan Ayckbourn (III.iv)

== The Two Gentlemen of Verona ==
- From "The uncertain glory of an April day" (I.iii):
  See Uncertain Glory (disambiguation)
- The Unkindest Tide by Seanan McGuire (II.iii)

== The Winter's Tale ==
- There Was A Man Dwelt by a Churchyard, short story by M. R. James (from "There was a man ... Dwelt by a churchyard", II.i)
- He Drank, and Saw the Spider by Alex Bledsoe (from "I have drunk, and seen the spider", II.i)
- Fresh Horses, 1988 film by David Anspaugh (III.i)
- Exit, Pursued by a Bear by E. K. Johnston (stage direction in III.iii)
- Rosemary and Rue by Seanan McGuire (IV.iv)
- The Winter Long by Seanan McGuire (IV.iv)

== Other ==
- The Passionate Pilgrim, 1984 film with Eric Morecambe (from The Passionate Pilgrim, the title of a 16th-century anthology attributed to Shakespeare)
- A Red Rose Chain by Seanan McGuire, from Venus and Adonis

== See also ==
- List of book titles taken from literature
