= Cry havoc =

Cry havoc may refer to:

- "Cry 'Havoc!', and let slip the dogs of war", a quotation from William Shakespeare's play Julius Caesar
- Cry 'Havoc' (film), a 1943 war drama
- Cry Havoc (1981 board game)
- Cry Havoc (2016 board game)
- "Cry Havoc" (Grimm), an episode of the TV series Grimm
- Cry Havoc, an album by Destrophy
- Cry Havoc, the autobiography of Simon Mann
- Cry Havoc: The Great American Bring-down and How It Happened, a book by Ralph de Toledano
- Cry Havoc!, a book by Beverley Nichols
- Cry Havok, title of volume 4 of the comic book series X-Men Blue

== See also ==
- The Dogs of War (disambiguation)
