= Cliffhanger (disambiguation) =

A cliffhanger is a plot device as an ending of a fictional work.

Cliffhanger(s) or Cliff Hanger(s) may also refer to:

== Film and television ==
- Cliffhanger (1993 film), 1993 action film starring Sylvester Stallone and John Lithgow
- Cliffhanger (2027 film), a film reboot of the 1993 film
- Cliffhangers (TV series), American television series
- Cliff Hanger, animated series character on Between the Lions
- Cliff Hangers, game show pricing game, see List of The Price Is Right pricing games
- Cliffhanger, obstacle on the sports entertainment gameshow Sasuke.
- "The Cliffhanger", series episode of The O.C. season 3

== Music ==
- Cliff Hanger (album), 1985 album by Jimmy Cliff
- Cliffhanger (band), Dutch progressive rock band
- "Cliffhanger", a song by Man Overboard from Heavy Love
- Cliff Hanger, guitarist in Deaf School and alias of Clive Langer
- "Cliffhanger", a song by Hinatazaka46

== Comics ==
- Cliffhanger (comics), an imprint (brand name) of the comic book publisher Wildstorm
- Cliff Hanger (comic strip), two separate 1983 comic strips

== Video games ==
- Cliffhanger (video game) video game based on the 1993 film
- Cliff Hanger (video game), 1983 laserdisc video game based on the manga and anime series Lupin III
- The Cliffhanger: Edward Randy 1990 video game

== Amusement parks ==
- Cliffhanger (Colorado roller coaster), at Glenwood Caverns Adventure Park, Glenwood Springs, Colorado
- Cliffhanger (ride), type of amusement park ride
