= Bedfellows =

Bedfellows may refer to:

- "Bedfellows", an episode of Rocko's Modern Life
- "Bedfellows" (Law & Order: Criminal Intent), an episode of Criminal Intent
- "Bedfellows" (The Unit), an episode of the television series The Unit
- The Bedfellows, 2012 adult-oriented American webcomic and webseries

== See also ==
- Strange bedfellows (disambiguation)
