= Wed =

WED, Wed, or wed may refer to:

- Wed, to get married in a wedding (e.g., "Jack wed Jill")
- Wednesday, abbreviated Wed.
- Walter Elias Disney
- Walt Disney Imagineering, originally named WED Enterprises
- Wendouree railway station, Australia
- Western Economic Diversification Canada, or WED, a Canadian government agency
- Where Eagles Dare (disambiguation)
- Willis-Ekbom disease, or WED, also known as restless legs syndrome
- World Environment Day, or WED
