= Green-Eyed Monster (disambiguation) =

Green-Eyed Monster may refer to jealousy, a phrase possibly coined by Shakespeare in Othello (Act III, scene 3, line 196).

Green-Eyed Monster may also refer to:

== TV episodes ==
- "Green-Eyed Monster" (Veronica Mars), episode four of season two of Veronica Mars
- "The Green-Eyed Monster" (Hercules: The Legendary Journeys)
- "Green-eyed Monster", episode of Cannonball (1958)
- "Green-Eyed Monster, season 3, episode 12 from The Facts of Life (1982)
- "The Green Eyed Monster", episode 127, series 9 of The Bill (1993)
- "The Green Eyed Monster", episode 15 of Masked Rider (1996)
- "The Green Eyed Monster", series 2 episode of The Thin Blue Line (1996)
- "Green-Eyed Monster", episode 15 of Ghost Stories (1998)
- "Cocoon Gables / Green-Eyed Monster", 1998 episode of Pepper Ann
- "Green Eyed Monster" (Farscape episode), episode 52-308 of Farscape (2001)
- "The Green-Eyed Monster", series 2 episode of All About Me (2003)
- "Green Eyed Monster", episode 6 of Sabrina's Secret Life (2003)
- "The Green-Eyed Monster", episode 6 of First Class (2008)
- "The Green-Eyed Monster", episode 119 of The Dooley and Pals Show

== Music ==
- The Green-eyed Monster (or How to Get Your Money), operatic farce by Thomas Welsh (1811)
- The Green-eyed Monster, musical comedy by James Planché (1828)
- "Green Eyed Monster", from ...Meanwhile by 10cc (1992)
- "Green Eyed Monster", from Pesto by Less Than Jake (1999)
- "Green Eyed Monster", from On My Own by Suzi Rawn (2002)
- "Green Eyed Monster", De/Vision single
- "Green-Eyed Monster", from Beautiful Seed by Corrinne May (2007)

== Other ==
- The Green-Eyed Monster (1916 film), a lost silent film drama
- The Green Eyed Monster (1919 film)
- The Green-Eyed Monster (2001 film), a two-part British television crime drama film
- "The Green Eyed Monster", a short story featuring Augustus S. F. X. Van Dusen
- The Green-Eyed Monster, 1970–71 storyline in Modesty Blaise
- Incredible Hulk (cocktail), also called Green Eyed Monster
- "The Green Eyed Monster", an episode of CBS Radio Mystery Theatre adapted from the play Othello by Shakespeare
- The Green Eyed Monster, a nickname for the Helmet-mounted display unit found on the US Army's AH-64 attack helicopter
- The butterfly Nepheronia buquetii, also called the green-eyed monster

== See also ==
- The Berenstain Bears and the Green Eyed Monster
- Green Monster (disambiguation)
- "Green Eyed Monster Girl", a track on High on You by Sly & the Family Stone
