= Heavy Is the Crown =

Heavy Is the Crown may refer to:

- "Heavy Is the Crown" (Daughtry song), 2021
- "Heavy Is the Crown" (Linkin Park song), 2024
- "Heavy Is the Crown", a 2024 episode of the TV series Arcane
- Heavy Is the Crown, a 2026 collaborative album by Anderson .Paak and Cordae

== See also ==
- Heavy Lies the Crown (disambiguation)
- Heavy Is the Head (disambiguation)
