= Ides of March (disambiguation) =

The Ides of March (the "middle of March") is the 15th day of the Roman month of Martius.

Ides of March or The Ides of March may also refer to:

== Art ==
- The Ides of March (painting), an 1883 painting by Edward Poynter

== Film ==
- The Ides of March (1961 film), a 1961 Australian TV play
- The Ides of March (2011 film), a 2011 film by George Clooney

== History ==
- Ides of March coin a 43 BC coin celebrating the assassination of Julius Caesar

== Music ==
- The Ides of March (band), in 1970, American rock band that had a major hit with the song "Vehicle"
- "Ides of March", a 1971 instrumental by John Cale and Terry Riley from Church of Anthrax
- "The Ides of March", a 1981 instrumental by Iron Maiden from Killers
- "The Ides of March", a 2005 song by Silverstein from Discovering the Waterfront
- The Ides of March (album), 2021, by Myles Kennedy

== Publications ==
- "The Ides of March" (short story), an 1898 short story by E. W. Hornung in The Amateur Cracksman
- The Ides of March (novel), a 1948 novel by Thornton Wilder

== Television ==
- "The Ides of March", 1995, a first season episode of Party of Five
- "The Ides of March" (Up Pompeii!), a 1970 episode
- "The Ides of March", 1999, a fourth season episode of Xena: Warrior Princess

== See also ==
- Assassination of Julius Caesar
- March 15
