= To Be or Not to Be =

To Be or Not to Be may refer to:

- "To be, or not to be", a speech from Hamlet

== Film and television ==
- To Be or Not to Be (1942 film), directed by Ernst Lubitsch
- To Be or Not to Be (1983 film), directed by Alan Johnson and produced by Mel Brooks
- To Be or Not to Be (TV series), starring Maggie Cheung Ho-yee and Prudence Liew
- "To Be or Not to Be" (Doctors), a 2003 television episode
- "To Be or Not to Be" (seaQuest DSV), a 1993 television episode
- "To Be or Not to Be...", a 1999 episode of Dawson's Creek

== Music ==
=== Albums ===
- To Be or Not to Be, 1981 album by Christian Langlade (Saint-Preux)
- To Be or Not to Be, 1995 album by Cliffhanger
- To Be or Not to Be, 1995 album by Crash
- To Be or Not to Be (album), 2013 album by Nightmare

=== Songs ===
- "To Be or Not to Be (BA Robertson song)", 1980 song by BA Robertson
- "To Be or Not to Be (The Hitler Rap)", 1983 song by Mel Brooks
- "To Be or Not to Be", 1936 song by Irving Berlin
- "To Be or Not to Be", 1965 song by Otis Leavill, composed by Billy Butler
- "To Be or Not to Be", 1987 song by Patricia Marx, from the 1987 album Patricia 'Paty'
- "To Be or Not to Be", song by the Bee Gees, from the 1965 album The Bee Gees Sing and Play 14 Barry Gibb Songs
- "To Be or Not to Be", 1965 song by The Buckinghams
- "To Be or Not to Be", 1965 song by Eddy Mitchell, composed by Claude Moine and Jean-Pierre Bourtayre
- "To Be or Not to Be", 1967 song by The Mindbenders
- "To Be or Not to Be", 1975 song Johnny Farnham, composed Farnham

== Other uses ==
- To Be or Not to Be (book), 2013 novel by Ryan North
- To Be or Not to Be (play), 2008 play by Nick Whitby

== See also ==
- "2 B R 0 2 B", 1962 short story by Kurt Vonnegut
- To Be or Not to Bop, 1979 book by Dizzy Gillespie and Al Fraser
- "Toby or Not Toby", 2016 episode of Scorpion
- "TB or Not TB", 2005 episode of House
- TV or Not TV (disambiguation)
