= Chromaroma =

- Website type: Game
- Available in: English
- Owner: Mudlark
- Registration: Required
- Users: 10,000
- Launched: 30 November 2010; 15 years ago
- Current status: Defunct

Chromaroma was a London-based game using players’ Oyster cards and Barclays Cycle Hire accounts. Points are awarded depending on the stations and journeys users complete on the London Underground and London Buses, as well as using ‘Boris bikes’. It is described by its creators, Mudlark, as “location-based top trumps”, and encourages competition through leaderboards.

Chromaroma had funding from 4iP (Channel 4’s innovation fund) and Screen West Midlands since a concept was arrived at in early 2009.

The game was designed by Toby Barnes & Matt Watkins of Mudlark.

The game was launched to the public on 30 November 2010, when snow closed Gatwick Airport and caused severe delays on London's tube network.
