= The Quality of Mercy =

The Quality of Mercy or Quality of Mercy may refer to:

- "The quality of mercy", a notable speech in William Shakespeare's play The Merchant of Venice

== Television and films ==
- "A Quality of Mercy", an episode of the science-fiction television series Twilight Zone
- "A Quality of Mercy" (Star Trek: Strange New Worlds), a 2022 science-fiction episode
- "Quality of Mercy" (The Outer Limits), a 1995 science-fiction episode
- Quality of Mercy (TV series), a 1975 Australian TV series
- "The Quality of Mercy" (Babylon 5), a 1994 science-fiction television episode
- "The Quality of Mercy" (Upstart Crow), a 2016 British sitcom episode
- The Quality of Mercy (film) (Hasenjagd – Vor lauter Feigheit gibt es kein Erbarmen), a 1994 Austrian film
- The Quality of Mercy, a 2002 film starring Mary-Louise Parker
- "The Quality of Mercy", an episode of the television series Early Edition
- "The Quality of Mercy", an episode of season 6 of the television series Mad Men
- "The Quality of Mercy", an episode of the television series Lewis
- "The Quality of Mercy", the series premiere of the 1961 American television show The Defenders
- "The Quality of Mercy at 29K", an episode of season 1 of the television series Sports Night, co-written by Aaron Sorkin

== Books ==
- The Quality of Mercy, a Socialist novel by William Dean Howells, published in 1892
- The Quality of Mercy: An Autobiography, by American actress Mercedes McCambridge, published in 1981
- The Quality of Mercy, an historical novel by Faye Kellerman, published in 1989
- The Quality of Mercy: Personal Essays on Mormon Experience, a book by Eugene England, published in 1992
- The Quality of Mercy, a mystery by Gilbert Morris, published in 1993
- The Quality of Mercy, a mystery by David Roberts, published in 2006
- The Quality of Mercy: Cambodia, Holocaust and Modern Conscience, by William Shawcross#, published in 1984
- "The Quality of Mercy" (Unsworth novel), an historical novel by Barry Unsworth, published in 2011
- "The Quality of Mercy: The Lives of Sir James and Lady Cantlie" Written by Sir James Cantlie's niece Jean Cantlie Stewart. Published by Rowan Books 3 March 1983

== Music ==
- The Quality of Mercy Is Not Strnen, a 1979 album by The Mekons
- The Quality of Mercy (album), a 2005 album by Steve Harley & Cockney Rebel
- "Quality of Mercy", a song by Michelle Shocked
