= Green Monster (disambiguation) =

The Green Monster is the left field wall at Fenway Park in Boston, Massachusetts.

Green Monster may also refer to:

Boston Red Sox

- Wally the Green Monster, mascot
- Green Monster (novel), featuring the Red Sox

Infrastructure nicknames

- Hart Bridge in Jacksonville, Florida
- Central Artery, an elevated section of I-93 freeway in downtown Boston, Massachusetts, before it was rebuilt underground as part of the Big Dig project

Other

- Aerin Frankel, a goalie for the Boston Fleet nicknamed the "Green Monster"
- Green Monster (automobile), series of dragsters and land speed record cars built by Art Arfons between 1952 and 1991.
- Green Monster (EP), 2008 release by Suicide Silence
- Green Monster Games, later 38 Studios, now defunct, video game developers
- Green Monster of Braxton County, or Flatwoods monster, 1952 cryptid

== See also ==
- Green-Eyed Monster (disambiguation)
