= TV or Not TV (disambiguation) =

TV or Not TV is a 1973 studio album by Proctor and Bergman.

TV or Not TV may also refer to:

== Episodes ==
- "TV or Not TV" (The Honeymooners), 1955
- "TV or Not TV" (The Jetsons), 1963
- "TV or Not TV" (The Andy Griffith Show), 1965
- "TV or Not TV" (Bewitched), 1971

== See also ==
- To Be or Not to Be (disambiguation)
