= Mudlark (company) =

Digital production company

- Available in: English
- Owner: Toby Barnes
- Key people: Charles Hunter, Toby Barnes, Matt Watkins
- Industry: Tech & Arts
- Registration: Required
- Launched: November 30, 2010
- Current status: Shut

Mudlark was a production company launched in 2010 that developed a number of X-platform games and performances. The largest of which was Chromaroma, a game that used players' Oyster cards and Barclays Cycle Hire accounts.

Mudlark was also noted for developing, writing and performing Such Tweet Sorrow with the Royal Shakespeare Company.

Points were awarded depending on the stations and journeys users complete on the London Underground and London Buses, as well as using "Boris bikes". It was described by its creators, Mudlark, as "location-based top trumps", and encouraged competition through leaderboards.

The game was launched to the public on 30 November 2010, when snow closed Gatwick Airport and caused severe delays on London's tube network. It was funded by Channel 4's 4ip Digital Investment fund.

Mudlark was based in the East Midlands with a sister studio in Birmingham.
