= Journey's End (disambiguation) =

Journey's End is a 1928 play by R. C. Sherriff.

Journey's End may also refer to:

== Adaptations of the play ==
- Journey's End: A Novel, a 1930 novel by R. C. Sherriff and Vernon Bartlett
- Journey's End (1930 film), a British-American film adaptation
- Journey's End, a 1988 television adaptation; see Journey's End § Television
- Journey's End (2017 film), a British film adaptation

== Other films ==
- The Journey's End (film), a 1921 silent film
- Journey's End (2010 film), a Canadian documentary film

== Music ==
- Journey's End (album), a 1982 album by jazz bassist Miroslav Vitous
- A Journey's End, a 1998 album by Primordial
- "The Journey's End", a 1972 song by Strawbs

== Television ==
- "Journey's End" (Doctor Who), an episode of Doctor Who
- "Journey's End" (Star Trek: The Next Generation), an episode of Star Trek: The Next Generation
- "Journey's End", a three-episode season finale in Power Rangers Lost Galaxy
- "Journey's End", the final episode of Fullmetal Alchemist: Brotherhood

== Other uses ==
- Journey's End (Boca Grande, Florida), an historic site
- Journey's End (painting), painting by Indian artist Abanindranath Tagore
- Journey's End Corporation, a Canadian budget-hotel chain operator taken over by Westmont Hospitality Group in 1999
- Journey's End, an update to the video game Terraria

== See also ==
- The Other Side (1931 film), a German adaptation of Journey's End
- Aces High (1976 film), an English film based on Journey's End
- Twelfth Night, a play by Shakespeare, in which the song "O Mistress Mine" includes the words "journeys end" (Act II Scene 3)
