= Andrew Harman =

English author (born 1964)

Andrew Harman (born 1964) is an author from the United Kingdom known for writing pun-filled and farcical fantasy fiction.

== Life ==
Andrew Harman studied biochemistry at the University of York, being a member of Wentworth College.

Since 2000, Harman has moved on from writing to create YAY Games, a UK independent publisher of board and card games. This award-winning company released Frankenstein's Bodies in 2014 – inspired by the works of Iain Lowson in his RPG Dark Harvest: The Legacy of Frankenstein. This was followed in 2015 by the family friendly hit Sandcastles and 2016 sees the launch of Ominoes the brand new 6,000 year old game.

== Writing career ==
Harman rose to prominence in the 1990s as a writer of farcical fantasies and "tales of the absurd" after the success of Terry Pratchett's novels. Harman novels feature extremely convoluted plots and lots of puns and silly names. His first four novels are set in the kingdoms of Rhyngill and Cranachan, and feature recurring characters. Other of his novels are set in the fictional UK town of Camford, which is a hybridisation of the two university towns of Oxford and Cambridge.

Each of Harman's novels bear titles that pun on other famous works. His books are published under the Orbit imprint in the UK.

== Critical reception ==
The St. James Guide to Fantasy Writers described Harman's fiction as "sometimes clever and occasionally very amusing, but it consists of many jokes for the sake of jokes and is a little way removed from the conventional fantasy novel." The St. James Guide also described Harman's puns as "even worse than those of Piers Anthony." However, Waterstone's Guide to Science Fiction, Fantasy & Horror said that Harman was "One of the most ingenious and energetic writers of humorous fantasy. 'The nearest', as one reviewer noted, 'to a genuine rival to Terry Pratchett.'"

Don D'Ammassa in Science Fiction Chronicle said that Fahrenheit 666 was "Filled with puns, absurd situations, clever literary asides and outright farce, without the clumsy childishness of less talented writers who've tried to do the same."

In a review in the British magazine Interzone, Chris Gilmore said, "There is hardly a word in The Sorcerer's Appendix by Andrew Harman which fails to grate. Harman's recipe for humour is to invent a large number of very stupid characters, and show them behaving in very stupid ways, time after time. He then explains to the reader what has transpired, repeating much of it."

== Bibliography ==
=== Firkin series ===
- The Sorcerer's Appendix (1993)
- The Frogs of War (1994)
- The Tome Tunnel (1994)
- Fahrenheit 666 (1995)
- One Hundred And One Damnations (1995)

=== Standalone novels ===
- The Scrying Game (1996)
- The Deity Dozen (1996)
- A Midsummer Night's Gene (1997)
- It Came from on High (1998) aka Beyond Belief (this was a working title)
- The Suburban Salamander Incident (1999)
- Talonspotting (2000)

Note: Beyond Belief (1998), which shows up in various Internet booklists, does not exist, as it was the working title that became It Came From on High – the satirical novel about what occurs when the Pope discovers that aliens exist.
