= A Midsummer Night's Dream (disambiguation) =

A Midsummer Night's Dream is a 1595 play by William Shakespeare.

A Midsummer Night's Dream may also refer to:

== Arts ==
=== Film ===
- A Midsummer Night's Dream (1909 film), an American silent film
- A Midsummer Night's Dream (1935 film), an American film directed by Max Reinhardt and William Dieterle
- A Midsummer Night's Dream (1959 film), a Czechoslovak puppet version by Jiří Trnka
- A Midsummer Night's Dream (1968 film), a British film directed by Peter Hall
- A Midsummer Night's Dream (1969 film), a French television film directed by Jean-Christophe Averty
- A Midsummer Night's Dream (1981 film), a BBC Television Shakespeare production directed by Elijah Moshinsky
- A Midsummer Night's Dream (1999 film), a British-American-Italian film directed by Michael Hoffman
- A Midsummer Night's Dream (2016 film), a British television film directed by David Kerr
- A Midsummer Night's Dream (2017 film), an American modernized version by Casey Wilder Mott
- xxxHolic: A Midsummer Night's Dream, a 2005 Japanese anime film

=== Other uses inarts ===
- A Midsummer Night's Dream (Mendelssohn), an overture (1826) and incidental music (1842) by Felix Mendelssohn
- A Midsummer Night's Dream (opera), 1960 by Benjamin Britten
- A Midsummer Night's Dream (ballet), 1962 by George Balanchine, set to Mendelssohn's music
- RSC production of A Midsummer Night's Dream (1970), directed by Peter Brook
- A Midsummer Night's Dream, a 1997 album by Steve Hackett
- "Midsummer Night's Dream", a manga episode; see list of Oh My Goddess! episodes

== See also ==
- The Dream (ballet), 1964 by Sir Frederick Ashton, set to Mendelssohn's music
- A Midsummer Night's Gene, a 1997 sci-fi parody novel of Shakespeare's play
- A Midsummer Night's Lewd Dream, a Japanese gay porn video
- A Midsummer NMIXX’s Dream, a 2023 single by NMIXX
- Le songe d'une nuit d'été, an 1850 opera by Ambroise Thomas with the same French title as, but not based on, the Shakespeare play
- "A Midsummer's Nice Dream", a 2011 episode of The Simpsons
