= Passing Stranger (disambiguation) =

Passing Stranger is the debut album of British singer-songwriter, Scott Matthews, and was originally released in April 2006.

Passing Stranger or Passing Strangers may also refer to:

- The Passing Stranger, a 1954 British crime film
- "Passing Strangers", a song by Ultravox from the 1980 album Vienna
- "Passing Strangers" (1957 song), written by Mel Mitchell, Stanley Applebaum and Rita Mann

== See also ==
- Passing Strange (disambiguation)
