= The Dogs of War =

The Dogs of War or Dogs of War may refer to:

== Literature ==
- "The dogs of war" (phrase), a phrase from the play Julius Caesar by William Shakespeare
- The Dogs of War (novel), a 1974 novel by Frederick Forsyth
- Dogs of War (comics), a 1994 series published by Defiant
- Dogs of War, an anthology of short stories edited by David Drake
- The Dogs of War (comics), a supervillain duo
- Dogs of War (2017 novel), a novel by Adrian Tchaikovsky
- Star Trek: Deep Space Nine – The Dog of War, a Star Trek five-issue comic book limited series published by IDW Publishing (April–August 2023)

== Film ==
- Dogs of War! (film), a 1923 short film in the Our Gang series
- The Dogs of War (film), a 1980 film based on the Forsyth novel
- War Dogs (2016 film), an American film directed by Todd Phillips

== Television ==
- "The Dogs of War" (Star Trek: Deep Space Nine), an episode of Star Trek: Deep Space Nine
- "The Dogs of War" (The West Wing), an episode of The West Wing
- "Dogs of War", an episode of Wilfred

== Gaming ==
- Dogs of War (1989 video game), a run and gun game published in 1989
- Dogs of War (2000 video game), a science fiction real-time strategy game
- Dogs of War (Warhammer), several groups in the Warhammer universe
- Medal of Honor: European Assault or Medal of Honor: Dogs of War, a first-person shooter video game

== Music ==
- Dogs of War (album), a 1995 album by Saxon, or the title song

=== Songs ===
- "The Dogs of War" (song), a 1987 song by Pink Floyd
- "Dogs of War", a song by The Exploited from Punks Not Dead
- "Dogs of War", a song by Ghostface Killah from Fishscale
- "Dogs of War", a song by Motörhead from Snake Bite Love
- "Dogs of War", a song by The Sensational Alex Harvey Band from SAHB Stories
- "Dogs of War", a song by Biohazard from New World Disorder
- "Dogs of War", a song by AC/DC from Rock or Bust
- "Dogs of War", a song by Blues Saraceno from the album Dark Country 3 by Various artists
- "Dogs of War", a 2024 non-album single by Mötley Crüe

== Sport ==
- Dogs of War, a nickname briefly attributed to Everton F.C.
- Dogs of War, a temporary wrestling stable consisting of Dolph Ziggler, Drew McIntyre, and Braun Strowman

== Warfare ==
- Mercenaries, soldiers who take part in a conflict for personal gain
- Dogs in warfare, the use of dogs in combat

== See also ==
- War Dogs (disambiguation)
- Hogs of War, a 2000 video game
