= Sea change =

Sea change, seachange or The Sea Change may refer to:

== Literature ==
- Sea Change (Parker novel), a Jesse Stone novel by Robert B. Parker (2006)
- "Sea Change", a novel by Nancy Kress (2020)
- Sea Change (Armstrong novel), a children's book by Richard Armstrong (1948)
- Sea Change (Powlik novel), a thriller by James Powlik (1999)
- "The Sea Change", a short story by Ernest Hemingway in the collection Winner Take Nothing (1933)
- The Sea Change, a book by historian H. Stuart Hughes (1975)
- Sea Change, a young-adult novel by Aimee Friedman (2009)
- Sea Change, a poetry collection by Jorie Graham (2008)
- "Sea Change", a short story by Thomas N. Scortia (1956)
- A Sea-Change, a play by William Dean Howells (1888)

== Music ==
- Sea Change (album), a 2002 album by Beck
- Seachange (band), a band from Nottingham, United Kingdom
- "Sea Change", a song by Turin Brakes from Outbursts

== Film and television ==
- The Sea Change, a 1998 British-Spanish comedy film
- Jesse Stone: Sea Change, the fourth film in the Jesse Stone series, 2007
- SeaChange, an Australian drama television series
- "Sea Change" (The Transformers), a television episode
- Sea Change: The Gulf of Maine, a PBS Nova presentation

== Other ==
- Sea change (idiom), an English idiomatic expression for broad transformation, drawn from a phrase in Shakespeare's The Tempest
- Seachange (demography), human migration from cities in favour of rural coastal communities
- Seachange (horse) (born 2002), New Zealand thoroughbred racehorse
- Sea Change (Northeast Harbor, Maine), U.S., a historic summer house
- SeaChange International, a video services software company, headquartered in Acton, Massachusetts.

== See also ==
- The Real Seachange, an Australian reality television series
