= Cry Havoc (2016 board game) =

2016 board wargame

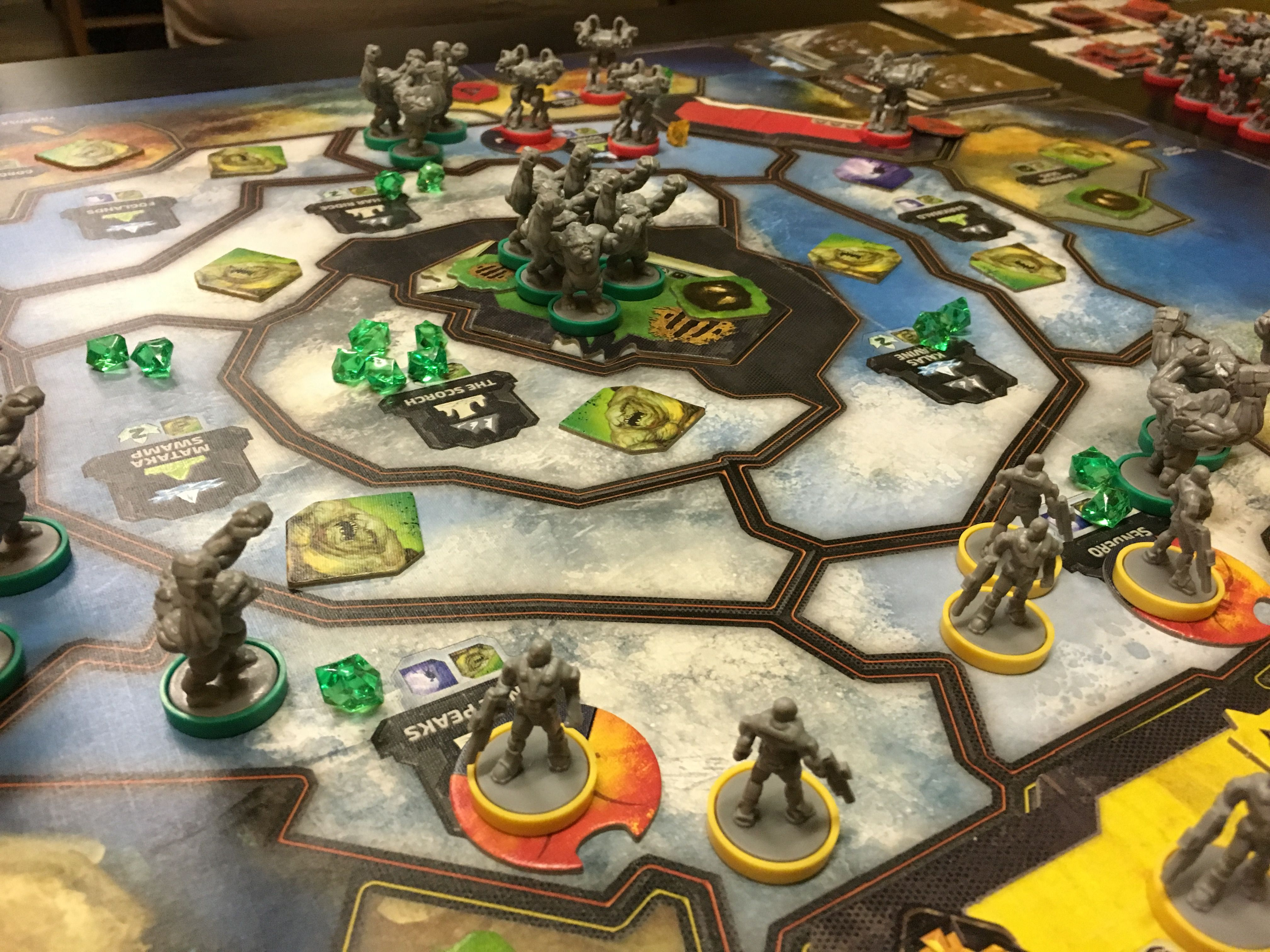
A four-player game

Cry Havoc is a 2016 science-fiction themed card-driven, asymmetric, area control wargame published by Polish company Portal Games, designed by Grant Rodiek, Michał Oracz and Michał Walczak.

It won the 2016 Cardboard Republic Striker Laurel, 2016 Board Game Quest Awards Best Tactical/Combat Game and 2017 Goblin Magnifico awards.
