= P. M. Hubbard =

British writer (1910–1980)

Philip Maitland Hubbard (9 November 1910 – 17 March 1980) was a British writer. He was known principally for his crime and suspense novels and stories, although he wrote in other genres as well, contributing short stories and poetry to The Magazine of Fantasy and Science Fiction and articles, verse, and parliamentary reports for Punch.

== Early life ==
Hubbard was born in Reading, England, the second son of Wilton Hubbard, a stockbroker, and his wife Millicent, who had been born in Bombay. His grandfather, Henry Dickenson Hubbard (1824–1913), was a clergyman of the Church of England who left a substantial fortune. Hubbard was brought up mostly in Guernsey in the Channel Islands, where his father had gone to improve his health, and was educated at Elizabeth College, Guernsey, then at Jesus College, Oxford, where in 1933 he won the Newdigate Prize for poetry with a poem called "Ovid among the Goths".

== Life ==
On 3 October 1934, by Open Competition, Hubbard joined the Indian Civil Service and went on to become the last District Commissioner of the Punjab before Indian independence in 1947. After that, he worked for the British Council and then as Deputy Director of the National Union of Manufacturers. From 1960 until his death he worked as a freelance writer. Apart from novels, he also wrote articles for Punch and light verse.

On 7 October 1937, Hubbard married Eleanor Onyx Slingsby Todd at the Church of St James, Delhi. After returning to England, he and his wife settled at Horsehill Cottage, Stoke Abbott, near Beaminster, Dorset, where they lived with their three children, Jane, Caroline and Peter. Some years later he separated from his wife, and in 1973 he moved to south-west Scotland.

P. M. Hubbard's main output was sixteen full-length novels for adults. These are typically suspense stories which have their settings in the countryside or on the coast of England or Scotland, although one, The Country of Again, is set mainly in Pakistan. Most of the novels feature a male protagonist (although in some, such as Flush as May and The Quiet River, the protagonist is a woman) and characters who in general are educated, articulate, and essentially amoral. They draw extensively on one or more of the author's interests and preoccupations, including country sports, small-boat sailing, folk religion, and the works of William Shakespeare.

Hubbard's novel High Tide was adapted for television and broadcast in 1980 as part of the British ITV network's "Armchair Thriller" series.

Hubbard was described in his obituary in The Times as a "most imaginative and distinguished practitioner", writing with an "assurance and individuality of style and tone." He died on 17 March 1980 in Newton Stewart, Galloway.

== Bibliography ==
=== Adult suspense novels ===
- Flush as May (1963)
- Picture of Millie (1964)
- A Hive of Glass (1966)
- The Holm Oaks (1966)
- The Tower (1968)
- The Custom of the Country (as The Country of Again in US) (1969)
- Cold Waters (1969)
- High Tide (1971)
- The Dancing Man (1971)
- A Whisper in the Glen (1972)
- A Rooted Sorrow (1973)
- A Thirsty Evil (1974)
- The Graveyard(1975)
- The Causeway (1976)
- The Quiet River (1978)
- Kill Claudio (1979)

=== Novels written for children ===
- Anna Highbury (1963)
- Rat Trap Island (1964)

=== Short stories ===
- "Ioan and the Tabriskas" (1970)

== Sources ==
- New General Catalog of Old Books and Authors
