= Mortal Engines (disambiguation) =

Mortal Engines is a 2001 novel by Philip Reeve.

Mortal Engines may also refer to:

- Mortal Engines (film), a 2018 film based on the novel
  - Mortal Engines (soundtrack), the soundtrack for the film
- Mortal Engines Quartet, the series of which Reeve's book is a part
- Mortal Engines (Lem), a collection of short stories by Stanislaw Lem
