= Up Pompeii! series 1 =

Up Pompeii!
- Season 1
- No. of episodes: 7

Release
- Original network: BBC1
- Original release: Pilot: 17 September 1969; Series: 30 March 1970 - 11 May 1970

Up Pompeii!'s first series originally aired on BBC1 between 30 March and 11 May 1970. The pilot episode, "Up Pompeii!", premiered on the BBC's Comedy Playhouse on 17 September 1969. The first series was written by Talbot Rothwell, best remembered for his scripts for the Carry On films.

== Main actors ==
The main actors of the first series are:

Actor	Role
Frankie Howerd	Lurcio, slave to the Sextus family
Max Adrian	Senator Ludricus Sextus
Elizabeth Larner	Ammonia Sextus, wife of Ludricus
Kerry Gardner	Nausius Sextus, son of Ludricus
Georgina Moon	Erotica Sextus, daughter of Ludricus
Willie Rushton	Plautus, philosopher in the clouds
Jeanne Mockford	Senna the Soothsayer

== Guest actors ==
The major guest actors of the first series are:

Actor	Role	Episode #
Leon Thau	Noxious, owner of a bawdy house	1
Geoffrey Hughes	Piteous, Noxious' aide	1
Trisha Noble	High Priestess of the Vestal Virgins	1
Hugh Paddick	Runs the Grand Eureka Session (a lottery) before the Vestal Virgin competition	1
Janet Mahoney	Tittea, substitute virgin #1	1
Penny Brahms	Virginia, substitute virgin #2	1
Sui Lin	Plautus' scribe	1
Jeremy Young	Ponderous, General to the mighty Cesar	2
Wendy Richard	Sopia, hand maiden in the Sextus household	2
Robert Gillespie	Plotter #1	2
Nicholas Smith	Plotter #2	2
Michael Knowles	Plotter #3	2
Colin Bean	Centurion	2
Sui Lin	Rent a Bit Girl	2
Derek Francis	Senator Lecherous Maximus	3
Norman Mitchell	Senator Stovus Primus	3
Valerie Leon	Daili	3
James Ottaway	Scrophulus	3
Wallas Eaton	Sergeant Jankus	4
Robin Hunter	Briton	4
Peter Needham	Briton	4
Olwen Griffiths	Hermione	5
Bill Maynard	Percentus (Theatre Manager)	5
Audrey Nicholson	Hernia	5
Douglas Ridley	Cuspidor	5
Wallas Eaton	Centurion Captain	6
Shaun Curry	Spartacus	6
Larry Martyn	Gaoler	6
Sui Lin	Prisoner	6
Lynda Baron	Ambrosia	7
John Cater	Castor Oilus	7
David Keran	Prodigious	7
Trisha Noble	Lusha	7
John Ringham	Buntus	7
Mollie Sugden	Flavia	7
Queenie Watts	Slave	7

== List of episodes ==
No.	Title	Original release date	Prod. code
1	"Vestal Virgins"	30 March 1970	TBA
Senator Ludicrus Sextus must select Miss Vestal Virgin at the Festival of the Vestal Virgins. Noxious wishes to embarrass Ludicrus for trying to close the bawdy houses by replacing the virgin competitors with girls from his bawdy house. Lurcio must find a real virgin to appease the Gods, unfortunately the only virgin available is Ludicrus' son, Nausius. With Nausius disguised as a woman the Gods are satisfied. Noxious decides to embarrass Ludicrus by taking Nausius into the Temple of the Virgins, where men are forbidden. Ludicrus manages to swap Nausius for his daughter, Erotica, who surprisingly is also a virgin. The Gods also make known that the High Priestess is not as innocent as she claims, and Lurcio is likely the culprit.
2	"The Ides of March"	6 April 1970	TBA
Ludicrus becomes involved in a plot to assassinate Caesar. His wife, Ammonia, asks Lurcio to stop him while she warns Caesar. Lurcio accidentally becomes chosen as the assassin. Caesar seduces Ammonia. Lurcio is arrested and, due to the resemblance, is ordered by General Ponderous to become Caesar's body double. Ludicrus finds Ammonia in Caesar's arms and, believing him to be Lurcio, tries to kill him. Chaos erupts as no one can tell the difference between Caesar and Lurcio. Finally, Caesar forgives Ludicrus for trying to kill him and Ludicrus forgives Caesar for seducing Ammonia and Caesar departs, having remembered he was supposed to meet his friends Brutus and Cassius on the Ides of March. Trivia: Frankie Howerd plays both Lurcio and Caesar.
3	"The Senator and the Asp"	13 April 1970	TBA
Senator Lecherous Maximus threatens to kill Ammonia unless she becomes his lover so Ammonia orders Lurcio to kill him with an Asp. Caesar asks Ludicrus to entertain Senator Stovus Primus, but when Stovus arrives Lurcio mistakes him for Lecherous and poisons him. Ammonia discovers Lecherous and throws him out while Stovus dies of the poison. Fortunately, word arrives Stovus was plotting Caesar's assassination, allowing Ludicrus to claim credit for foiling the plot and saving Caesar.
4	"Britannicus"	20 April 1970	TBA
Caesar declares war on Britain so Ludicrus volunteers himself and Lurcio to join the Roman army. Ammonia follows them to Britain as a camp follower, hoping to be seduced by a young, brave Roman soldier but is unknowingly assigned to Ludicrus' tent. Surprisingly she ends up enjoying herself with Ludicrus while unable to see his face in the dark. Lurcio accepts a Jerseyan Cow as a gift from Queen Boudica, causing the camp to be overrun by the Britains. Months later, Ludicrus and Lurcio return to Pompeii, having been spared execution due to Queen Boudica being Lurcio's childhood sweetheart.
5	"The Actors"	27 April 1970	TBA
The Olympia Theatre Company visits Pompeii and Ammonia wishes to meet Cuspidor, their leading actor and her former lover, not knowing Cuspidor has become a drunk. Ludicrus wishes to meet the leading actress, Hermione, of whom he is a devoted fan. Cuspidor passes out drunk so Lurcio replaces him, but Ammonia, believing Lurcio in his costume is Cuspidor, tries to seduce him. Ludicrus discovers Ammonia with Lurcio and takes her home. Cuspidor awakens and accuses Lurcio of seducing Hermione, his wife, so Lurcio returns home, thoroughly fed up with actors.
6	"Spartacus"	4 May 1970	TBA
Spartacus begins a slave rebellion, but Lurcio refuses to join due to cowardice. Lurcio is mistaken for a rebel anyway and imprisoned. Lurcio learns of a Roman plan to kill all the slaves in Pompeii and decides he is safer in prison. Ludicrus, Ammonia and Nausius all make attempts to free Lurcio but are themselves arrested. Fortunately, Spartacus attacks the jail, defeats the army and sets everyone free. Lurcio settles down to a life of comfort and luxury with Ludicrus and Ammonia as his slaves, only for Caesar to invade Pompeii and defeat Spartacus' army, returning Lurcio to a lowly slave again.
7	"The Love Potion"	4 May 1970	TBA
Lurcio learns Ludicrus' attractive new neighbour, Luscia, wants to meet Ludicrus and, knowing the house will be empty, disguises himself as Ludicrus to seduce her with a love potion. Unfortunately, the potion is drunk by several people who all fall in love with the wrong person. Luscia falls in love with Nausius while Ambrosia, Nausius first girlfriend, falls in love with Ludicrus. Erotica's gladiator boyfriend, Prodigious, falls in love with Lurcio while Ammonia's lover, Bumptious, falls in love with Erotica and Ammonia falls in love with Prodigious. Lurcio escapes the orgy only to be chased by Senna the Soothsayer who has also drunk the potion.
