= The Hollow Crown =

The Hollow Crown may refer to:

- a passage in Shakespeare's play Richard II
- The Hollow Crown (anthology), a 1961 work by John Barton
- The Hollow Crown (TV series), a 2012–2016 BBC adaptation of Shakespeare's history plays
- "The Hollow Crown" (Armchair Theatre), a 1956 British TV play
- "The Hollow Crown" (Primal), a 2026 TV episode
- Hollow Crown, a 2009 album by Architects
- The Hollow Crown: Ethnohistory of an Indian Kingdom, a 1988 book by Nicholas Dirks
- The Hollow Crown: The Wars of the Roses and the Rise of the Tudors, a 2014 book by Dan Jones
