= The Rest Is Silence =

The Rest Is Silence may refer to:

- "The rest is silence", the last words of Prince Hamlet in Shakespeare's play Hamlet
- "The rest is silence!—silence and joy for those who had endured so much suffering, yet found at last a great and lasting happiness." (Chapter XXXI "The Escape," The Scarlet Pimpernel, p. 223. Baroness Orczy, 1905)
- The Rest Is Silence (play), 1944 play by Harold Purcell
- The Rest Is Silence (1959 film) (German: Der Rest ist Schweigen), a 1959 German film
- A lyric in the song "Flesh Failures/Let the Sun Shine" from the 1967 musical Hair
- The Rest Is Silence (Randy album), a 1996 album by the Swedish band Randy
- Ostalo je ćutanje (English: The Rest Is Silence), a 1996 album by the Serbian band Riblja Čorba
- The Rest Is Silence (2007 film), a 2007 Romanian film

== See also ==
- The Rest Is Noise, a 2007 nonfiction book by Alex Ross
