= James Planché bibliography =

This is a list of the theatrical works of the nineteenth-century British playwright James Robinson Planché.

== Key ==
Genre	Key	Number of plays
Burlesque, allegorical burlesque, classical burlesque		5
Burlesque burletta		3
Pantomime		3
Comedy, musical comedy, lyrical comedy		22
Farce		10
Operatic drama, operatic comedy		3
Opera		22
Operetta		2
Melodrama		17
Fairy extravaganza, fairy spectacle		23
Burletta		20
Vaudeville, comedy vaudeville		7
Comic drama, fantastic drama, historical drama, musical drama		7
Drama		10
Dramatic review, review		7
Interlude		4
Historical play, masque, military spectacle, musical farce, pageant, play		9

== Works ==
Date	Title	Genre	Number of acts	Theatre	Notes
21 April 1818	Amoroso, King of Little Britain	Burlesque	One Act	Theatre Royal, Drury Lane	
21 December 1818	Rodolph, the Wolf; or, Columbine Red Riding-hood	Speaking Pantomime.		Olympic Theatre	
9 February 1819	The Troubadours; or, Jealousy Outwitted.	Operatic Drama.		Olympic Theatre.	(not printed)
13 April 1819	Abudah; or, The Talisman of Oromanes.	Melodrama	Two Acts.	Theatre Royal, Drury Lane,	(not printed)
21 June 1819	The Czar; or, A Day in the Dockyards.	Melodrama	Three Acts	Sadler's Wells	(not printed)
16 August 1819	The Caliph and the Cadi; or, Rambles in Bagdad.	Burletta	One Act		(not printed)
29 October 1819	Fancy's Sketch; or, 'Look before you Leap.'	Burletta	Two Acts	Adelphi Theatre	(not printed)
19 November 1819	Odds and Ends; or, Which is the Manager?	Burletta	One Act	Adelphi Theatre	(not printed)
9 August 1820	The Vampire; or, The Bride of the Isles.	Melodrama	Three Acts	Lyceum Theatre (English Opera House), Strand	
6 November 1820	A Burletta of Errors; or, Jupiter and Alcmena.	Burletta	Three Acts	Adelphi Theatre	(not printed)
13 November 1820	Who's to Father Me ?	Burletta	Two Acts	Adelphi Theatre	(not printed)
27 November 1820	The Deuce is in Her; or, Two Nights at Madrid	Burletta	Two Acts	Adelphi Theatre	(not printed)
11 December 1820	Zamoski; or, The Fortress and the Mine.	Melo-drama	Three Acts	Adelphi Theatre	(not printed)
6 December 1820	Dr. Syntax.	Christmas Pantomime.		Adelphi Theatre	
15 January 1821	Giovanni, the Vampire; or, 'How shall we get Rid of Him?'	Burletta	Three Acts	Adelphi Theatre	(not printed)
8 February 1821	Kenilworth Castle; or, the Days of Queen Bess.	Melodrama	Three Acts.	Adelphi Theatre	(not printed)
19 February 1821	Lodgings to Let.	Burletta	Two Acts	Adelphi Theatre	(not printed)
27 February 1821	Half-an-hour's Courtship; or, La Chambre à Coucher.	Burletta	One Act	Adelphi Theatre	(not printed)
12 March 1821	Sherwood Forest.	Burletta	Three Acts	Adelphi Theatre	(not printed)
23 April 1821	The Mountain Hut; or, The Tinker and His Son	Melodrama	Three Acts	Sadlers Wells	(not printed)
30 July 1821	The Witch of Derncleugh.	Opera	Three Acts	English Opera House, Lyceum, Strand	(not printed)
1 October 1821	Capers at Canterbury.	Burletta	Three Acts	Adelphi Theatre	(not printed)
22 October 1821	The Corsair's Bride; or, The Valley of Mount Etna.	Melodrama	Three Acts	Adelphi Theatre	(not printed)
8 November 1821	Love's Alarum.	Burletta	Two Acts	Adelphi Theatre	(not printed)
24 November 1821	Le Solitaire; or, The Unknown of the Mountain.	Melodrama	Three Acts	Olympic Theatre	(not printed)
14 January 1822	The Pirate.	Operatic Drama	Three Acts	Olympic Theatre	
10 July 1822	All in the Dark; or, The Banks of the Elbe.	Musical Drama	Two Acts	English Opera, Lyceum, Strand	
5 September 1822	The Fair Gabrielle.	Operetta	One Act	English Opera, Lyceum	
19 October 1822	Ali Pacha.	Melodrama	Two Acts	Theatre Royal, Covent Garden	
3 December 1822	Maid Marian; or, the Huntress of Arlingford.	Opera	Three Acts	Theatre Royal, Covent Garden	
8 May 1823	Clari; or, the Maid of Milan.	Opera	Three Acts	Theatre Royal, Covent Garden	
7 August 1823	I Will have a Wife.	Musical Farce	Two Acts	English Opera, Lyceum,	(not printed)
27 August 1823	Too Curious by Half; or, Marplot in Spain	Musical Drama	Two Acts	English Opera, Lyceum	(not printed)
5 November 1823	Cortez; or, the Conquest of Mexico.	Opera	Three Acts	Theatre Royal, Covent Garden	
19 January 1824	St. Ronan's Well.	Melodrama	Three Acts	Adelphi Theatre	(not printed)
6 July 1824	Military Tactics.	Interlude	One Act	English Opera House	(not printed)
3 September 1824	The Frozen Lake.	Opera	Two Acts	English Opera House	
14 October 1824	Der Freischütz	Opera	Three Acts	Theatre Royal, Covent Garden	
9 November 1824	The Woman never Vext; or, The Widow of Cornhill	Comedy	Five Acts	Theatre Royal, Covent Garden	
11 July 1825	Pageant of the Coronation of Charles 10th of France.	Pageant		Theatre Royal, Covent Garden	
21 October 1823	Lilla.	Opera	Two Acts	Theatre Royal, Covent Garden	(not printed)
8 November 1825	Jocko; or, the Brazilian Monkey.	Melodrama	Two Acts	Theatre Royal, Covent Garden	
12 December 1825	Success; or, a Hit if you Like it.	Allegorical Burlesque	One Act	Adelphi Theatre	
12 April 1826	Oberon; or, the Elf King's Oath.	Opera	Three Acts	Theatre Royal, Covent Garden	
31 October 1826	Returned Killed.	Farce	Two Acts	Theatre Royal, Covent Garden	
15 June 1827	All's Right; or, the Old Schoolfellow.	Interlude	One Act	Theatre Royal, Haymarket	(not printed)
9 July 1827	Pay to My Order; or, A Chaste Salute.	Vaudeville	One Act	Royal Gardens, Vauxhall	(songs only)
12 July 1827	The Rencontre; or, Love will find out the Way.	Operatic Comedy	Two Acts	Theatre Royal, Haymarket	(not printed)
11 August 1827	You Must Be Buried.	Farce	One Act	Theatre Royal, Haymarket	(not printed)
21 January 1828	Paris and London.	Burletta	Three Acts	Adelphi Theatre,	
5 February 1828	The Merchant's Wedding; or, London Frolics in 1638	Comedy	Five Acts	Theatre Royal, Covent Garden	altered from Rowley
27 May 1828	Carron Side; or, the Fête Champêtre.	Opera	Two Acts	Theatre Royal, Covent Garden	(not printed)
16 June 1828	A Daughter to Marry.	Interlude	One Act	Theatre Royal, Haymarket	
18 August 1828	The Green-eyed Monster.	Musical Comedy	Two Acts	Theatre Royal, Haymarket	
21 October 1828	The Mason of Buda.	Burletta	Two Acts	Adelphi Theatre	
11 December 1828	Charles XII.; or, the Siege of Stralsund.	Drama	Two Acts	Theatre Royal, Drury Lane	
20 April 1829	Thierna-na-Oge; or, the Prince of the Lakes.	Melodrama	Two Acts	Theatre Royal, Drury Lane	(songs only)
21 May 1829	The Partisans; or, The War of Paris	Historical Drama	Five Acts	Theatre Royal, Drury Lane	(not printed)
1 July 1829	Manoeuvering.	Interlude	One Act (with C. Dance)	Theatre Royal, Haymarket	(not printed)
25 August 1829	Der Vampyr.	Opera	Three Acts	English Opera House	(songs only)
18 November 1829	The Brigand.	Drama	Two Acts	Theatre Royal, Drury Lane	
4 February 1830	The National Guard; or, Bride and no Bride.			Theatre Royal, Drury Lane	(not printed)
12 April 1830; Easter Monday	The Dragon's Gift; or, The Scarf of Flight and the Mirror of Light.	Melodrama	Two Acts	Theatre Royal, Drury Lane	(not printed)
1 May 1830	Hofer; or, The Tell of the Tyrol.	Opera	Three Acts	Theatre Royal, Drury Lane	
9 December 1830	The Jenkinses.	Farce	Two Acts	Theatre Royal, Drury Lane	
3 January 1831	Olympic Revels; or, Prometheus and Pandora.	Burletta	One Act	Olympic Theatre	(with C. Dance)
3 February 1831	The Romance of a Day.	Opera	Two Acts	Theatre Royal, Covent Garden	
5 March 1831	My Great Aunt; or, Where there's a Will.	Comedy	One Act	Olympic Theatre	
16 April 1831	The Legion of Honour.	Musical Drama	Two Acts	Theatre Royal, Drury Lane	(not printed)
28 June 1831	A Friend at Court.	Comedy	Two Acts	Theatre Royal, Haymarket	(not printed)
29 October 1831	The Army of the North; or, The Spaniard's Secret.	Drama	Two Acts	Theatre Royal, Covent Garden	(not printed)
3 November 1831	The Love Charm; or, The Village Coquette.	Opera	Two Acts	Theatre Royal, Drury Lane	(songs only)
26 December 1831	Olympic Devils; or, Orpheus and Eurydice.	Burletta	One Act	Olympic Theatre	(with C. Dance)
5 April 1832	The Compact.	Play	Three Acts	Theatre Royal, Drury Lane	(not printed)
1 October 1832	His First Campaign.	Military Spectacle	Two Acts	Theatre Royal, Covent Garden	(not printed)
26 December 1832	The Paphian Bower; or Venus and Adonis.	Burletta	One Act	Olympic Theatre	(with C. Dance)
18 February 1833	Promotion; or, A Morning at Versailles in 1750.	Vaudeville		Olympic Theatre	
4 March 1833	Reputation; or, The Court Secret.	Play	Five Acts	Theatre Royal, Covent Garden	
4 June 1833	The Students of Jena; or, the Family Concert.	Operetta	One Act	Theatre Royal, Drury Lane	(not printed)
9 September 1833	The Court Masque; or, Richmond in the Olden Time.	Opera	Two Acts	Adelphi Theatre (English Opera Company)	(songs only)
30 September 1833	High, Low, Jack, and the Game; or, The Card Party.	Burlesque Burletta	One Act	Olympic Theatre	(with C. Dance)
13 November 1833	Gustavus III.; or, The Masked Ball.	Opera	Three Acts	Theatre Royal, Covent Garden	
26 December 1833	The Deep, Deep Sea; or, Perseus and Andromeda.	Burlesque Burletta	One Act	Olympic Theatre	(with C. Dance)
1 April 1834	The Challenge.	Opera	Two Acts	Theatre Royal, Covent Garden	(songs only)
29 April 1834	Secret Service.	Comedy	Two Acts	Theatre Royal, Drury Lane	
29 September 1834	The Loan of a Lover.	Vaudeville	One Act	Olympic Theatre	
29 September 1834	My Friend, the Governor.	Vaudeville	One Act	Olympic Theatre	
18 October 1834	The Regent.	Drama	Two Acts	Theatre Royal, Drury Lane	
15 November 1834	The Red Mask.	Opera	Three Acts	Theatre Royal, Drury Lane	(songs only)
26 December 1834	Telemachus; or, the Island of Calypso.	Burlesque Burletta	One Act	Olympic Theatre	(with C. Dance)
14 March 1835	The Court Beauties.	Burletta	One Act	Olympic Theatre	
26 October 1835	The Travelling Carriage.	Melodrama	Two Acts	Theatre Royal, Drury Lane	(not printed)
16 November 1835	The Jewess.	Drama	Three Acts	Theatre Royal, Drury Lane	
3 March 1836	Chevy Chase.	Melodrama	Three Acts	Theatre Royal, Drury Lane	(not printed)
29 September 1836	Court Favour.	Comedy	Two Acts	Olympic Theatre	
8 November 1836	Siege of Corinth.	Opera	Three Acts	Theatre Royal, Drury Lane	(songs only)
30 November 1836	The Two Figaros.	Comedy Vaudeville	Two Acts	Olympic Theatre	
26 December 1836	Riquet with the Tuft.	Burletta	One Act	Olympic Theatre	(with C. Dance)
3 May 1837	A Peculiar Position.	Farce	One Act	Olympic Theatre	
24 June 1837	Norma.	Opera	Two Acts	Theatre Royal, Drury Lane	
29 September 1837	The New Servant.	Vaudeville	One Act	Olympic Theatre	(not printed)
7 October 1837	The Child of the Wreck.	Melodrama	Two Acts	Theatre Royal, Drury Lane	
6 November 1837	Caractacus.	Play	Five Acts	Theatre Royal, Drury Lane	(not printed) (altered from Beaumont and Fletcher)
26 December 1837	Puss in Boots.	Burletta	One Act	Olympic Theatre	(with C. Dance)
10 March 1838	The Magic Flute.	Opera	Two Acts	Theatre Royal, Drury Lane	(songs only)
16 April 1838	The Drama's Levée; or, A Peep at the Past.	Review		Olympic Theatre	
11 October 1838	The Printer's Devil.	Farce	One Act	Olympic Theatre	
3 December 1838	The Queen's Horse.	Farce	One Act	Olympic Theatre	(with M.B. Honan)
2 January 1839	Blue Beard.	Fairy Extravaganza	One Act	Olympic Theatre	(with C. Dance)
28 February 1839	Faint Heart Never Won Fair Lady.	Comedy	One Act	Olympic Theatre	
1 April 1839	The Garrick Fever.	Farce	One Act	Olympic Theatre	
12 February 1840	The Fortunate Isles.	Masque in honour of Her Majesty's marriage		Theatre Royal, Covent Garden	
20 April 1840	The Sleeping Beauty in the Wood.	Fairy Extravaganza	Three Acts	Theatre Royal, Covent Garden	
13 October 1840	The Spanish Curate.	Comedy	Five Acts	Theatre Royal, Covent Garden	(altered from Beaumont and Fletcher)
26 December 1840	Harlequin and the Giant Helmet; or, The Castle of Otranto.	Pantomime		Theatre Royal, Covent Garden	
25 February 1841	The Captain of the Watch.	Comedy	One Act	Theatre Royal, Covent Garden	
22 March 1841	The Embassy.	Drama	Two Acts	Theatre Royal, Covent Garden	(not printed)
12 April 1841	Beauty and the Beast.	Fairy Extravaganza	Two Acts	Theatre Royal, Covent Garden	
15 March 1842	Marriage of Figaro.	Opera	Two Acts	Theatre Royal, Covent Garden	
28 March 1842	The White Cat.	Fairy Extravaganza	Two Acts	Theatre Royal, Covent Garden	
5 October 1842	The Follies of a Night.	Comedy Vaudeville	Two Acts	Theatre Royal, Drury Lane	
17 December 1842	The Way of the World.	Comedy	Five Acts	Theatre Royal, Haymarket	(not printed) (altered from Congreve)
17 April 1843	Fortunio; or, The Seven Gifted Servants.	Fairy Extravaganza	Two Acts	Theatre Royal, Drury Lane	
22 August 1843	Who's Your Friend? or, the Queensbury Fête.	Comedy	Two Acts	Theatre Royal, Haymarket	
26 December 1843	The Fair One with the Golden Locks.	Fairy Extravaganza	One Act	Theatre Royal, Haymarket	
22 February 1844	Grist to the Mill.	Comedy	Two Acts	Theatre Royal, Haymarket	
8 April 1844	The Drama at Home; or, An Evening with Puff.	Dramatic Review	One Act	Theatre Royal, Haymarket	
4 December 1844	Somebody Else.	Comedy	One Act	Theatre Royal, Haymarket	
26 December 1844	Graciosa and Percinet.	Fairy Extravaganza	One Act	Theatre Royal, Haymarket	
24 March 1845	The Golden Fleece.	Classical Burlesque	Two Acts	Theatre Royal, Haymarket	
23 September 1845	A Cabinet Question.	Farce	One Act	Theatre Royal, Haymarket	
26 December 1845	The Bee and the Orange Tree; or, The Four Wishes.	Fairy Extravaganza	One Act	Theatre Royal, Haymarket	
28 February 1846	The Irish Post.	Comic Drama	Two Acts	Theatre Royal, Haymarket	
18 April 1846	The 'Birds' of Aristophanes.	Classical Burlesque	One Act	Theatre Royal, Haymarket	
10 October 1846	Queen Mary's Bower.	Comedy	Three Acts	Theatre Royal, Haymarket	
15 October 1846	Spring Gardens.	Farce	One Act	Theatre Royal, Haymarket	
16 December 1846	Story Telling; or, Novel Effects.	Farce	One Act	Theatre Royal, Haymarket	
26 December 1846	The Invisible Prince.	Fairy Extravaganza	One Act	Theatre Royal, Haymarket	
5 April 1847	The New Planet; or, Harlequin out of Place.	Dramatic Review			
12 June 1847	The Jacobite.	Drama	Two Acts	Theatre Royal, Haymarket	
18 October 1847	The Pride of the Market.	Drama	Three Acts	Theatre Royal, Lyceum	
27 December 1847	The Golden Branch.	Fairy Extravaganza	Two Acts	Theatre Royal, Lyceum	
2 March 1848	Not a bad Judge.	Drama	Two Acts	Theatre Royal, Lyceum	
25 April 1848	Theseus and Ariadne.	Classical Burlesque	Two Acts	Theatre Royal, Lyceum	
26 December 1848	The King of the Peacocks.	Fairy Extravaganza	Two Acts	Theatre Royal, Lyceum	
8 March 1849	A Romantic Idea.	Fantastic Drama	One Act	Theatre Royal, Lyceum	
22 March 1849	Hold your Tongue.	Comedy	One Act	Theatre Royal, Lyceum	
9 April 1849	The Seven Champions of Christendom.	Fairy Extravaganza	Two Acts	Theatre Royal, Lyceum	
15 October 1849	A Lady in Difficulties	Comedy	Two Acts	Theatre Royal, Lyceum	
26 December 1849	The Island of Jewels.	Fairy Extravaganza	Two Acts	Theatre Royal, Lyceum	
4 February 1850	Fiesco; or, The Revolt of Genoa.	Historical Play	Five Acts	Theatre Royal, Drury Lane	
1 April 1850	Cymon and Iphigenia.	Fairy Extravaganza	One Act	Theatre Royal, Lyceum	
16 October 1850	My Heart's Idol.	Comedy	Two Acts	Theatre Royal, Lyceum	
11 November 1850	The White Hood.	Drama	Two Acts	Theatre Royal, Lyceum	(not printed)
4 December 1850	The Day of Reckoning.	Melodrama	Three Acts	Theatre Royal, Lyceum	
26 December 1850	"King Charming; or, The Blue Bird of Paradise.	Fairy Extravaganza	Two Acts	Theatre Royal, Lyceum	
21 April 1851	The Queen of the Frogs.	Fairy Extravaganza	Two Acts	Theatre Royal, Lyceum	
26 December 1851	The Prince of Happy Land; or, The Fawn in the Forest.	Fairy Extravaganza	Two Acts	Theatre Royal, Lyceum	
18 October 1852	The Mysterious Lady.	Comedy	Two Acts	Theatre Royal, Lyceum	
27 December 1852	The Good Woman in the Wood.	Fairy Extravaganza	Two Acts	Theatre Royal, Lyceum	
28 March 1853	Mr. Buckstone's Ascent of Mount Parnassus.	Dramatic Review,	One Act	Theatre Royal, Haymarket	
17 October 1853	The Camp at the Olympic.	Dramatic Review	One Act	Olympic Theatre	
26 December 1853	Once upon a time there were Two Kings.	Fairy Extravaganza	Two Acts	Theatre Royal, Lyceum	
12 April 1854	Mr. Buckstone's Voyage Round World (in Leicester Square).	Dramatic Review	One Act	Theatre Royal, Haymarket	
20 May 1854	The Knights of the Round Table.	Comedy	Five Acts	Theatre Royal, Haymarket	
26 December 1854	The Yellow Dwarf.	Fairy Extravaganza	One Act	Olympic Theatre	
9 April 1855	The New Haymarket Spring Meeting.	Dramatic Review	One Act	Theatre Royal, Haymarket	
26 December 1855	The Discreet Princess.	Fairy Extravaganza	One Act	Olympic Theatre	
26 December 1856	Young and Handsome.	Fairy Extravaganza	One Act	Olympic Theatre	
22 July 1859	An Old Offender.	Comic Drama	Two Acts	Adelphi Theatre	
24 September 1859	Love and Fortune.	Lyrical Comedy	One Act	Princess's Theatre	
12 July 1861	My Lord and My Lady.	Comedy	Five Acts	Theatre Royal, Haymarket	
3 November 1862	Love's Triumph.	Opera	Three Acts	Theatre Royal, Covent Garden	
26 December 1865	Orpheus in the Haymarket.	Classical Burlesque.		Theatre Royal, Haymarket	
26 December 1871	King Christmas.	Masque	One Act	Gallery of Illustration	
29 August 1872	Babil and Bijou	Fairy Spectacle	Five Acts and a Prologue	Theatre Royal, Covent Garden	by Dion Boucicault (songs only)
