= As You Like It (disambiguation) =

As You Like It is a pastoral comedy by William Shakespeare.

As You Like It may also refer to:

- As You Like It (1912 film), 1912 silent adaptation, directed by J. Stuart Blackton for his Vitagraph Company
- As You Like It (1936 film), adaptation directed by Paul Czinner
- As You Like It (1978), BBC Television Shakespeare, season one, directed by Basil Coleman
- As You Like It (1991 film), adaptation directed by Christine Edzard
- As You Like It (2006 film), adaptation directed by Kenneth Branagh
- As You Like It (TV series), Chinese-language television program
- "As You Like It", 1962 single by Adam Faith
- As You Like It (Friedrich Gulda album), by Friedrich Gulda
- As You Like It (Barenaked Ladies album), 2005 album
- As You Like It, play by Natyaguru Nurul Momen
