= Sigh No More =

Sigh No More may refer to:

- "Sigh No More", a song by William Shakespeare appearing in Much Ado About Nothing
- Sigh No More (musical), a 1945 musical revue written and produced by Noël Coward
- Sigh No More (Gamma Ray album), 1991
- Sigh No More (Mumford & Sons album), 2009
- Sigh No More, a 1991 album by Dog Age
