= Mortal coil (disambiguation) =

Mortal coil is a quotation from Shakespeare's Hamlet.

Mortal coil or this mortal coil may also refer to:

== Literature ==
- Mortal Coils, a 1922 collection of short stories by Aldous Huxley
- Skulduggery Pleasant: Mortal Coil, the fifth book in the Skulduggery Pleasant series
- This Mortal Coil (book), a 1947 collection of short stories by Cynthia Asquith

== Music ==
- "Mortal Coil", a song by God Is an Astronaut from the album Epitaph
- This Mortal Coil (album), a 2011 album by Redemption
- "This Mortal Coil", a song by Carcass from the album Heartwork
- This Mortal Coil, a British dream pop band
- The Mortal Coil (album), album by Polaris

== Television ==
- "Mortal Coil" (Star Trek: Voyager), a 1997 episode from the TV series Star Trek: Voyager
- "This Mortal Coil" (Stargate Atlantis), a 2007 episode from the TV series Stargate Atlantis

== Other uses ==
- Mortal Coil: Adrenalin Intelligence, a 1995 computer video game
- "The Mortal Coil", a 1992 two-part episode from the radio show Adventures in Odyssey

== See also ==
- Immortal Coil, a 2002 Star Trek: The Next Generation novel by Jeffrey Lang
- Coil (disambiguation)
