= The Serpent's Egg =

The Serpent's Egg may refer to:

- "a serpent's egg", a line from Shakespeare's Julius Caesar
- The Serpent's Egg (film), a 1977 film directed by Ingmar Bergman and set in 1920s Berlin
- The Serpent's Egg (album), by Dead Can Dance, 1988
- "The Serpent's Egg" (Defiance), a television episode
- Serpent's Egg (novel), a 1987 novel by R. A. Lafferty
- The Serpent's Egg, a 1950 novel by David Duncan
