= Much Ado About Nothing (disambiguation) =

Much Ado About Nothing is a comedy by William Shakespeare.

Much Ado About Nothing may also refer to:

- Much Ado About Nothing (1973 film)
- BBC Television Shakespeare – Season Seven – Much Ado About Nothing (1984) directed by Stuart Burge
- Much Ado About Nothing (1993 film)
- Much Ado About Nothing (2012 film)
- Much Ado About Nothing (2016 film)
- Much Ado About Nothing (opera)

== See also ==
- "Much Ado About Boimler", Star Trek: Lower Decks episode
- "Much Ado About Mousing", Tom and Jerry cartoon
- "Much Ado About Nutting", Merry Melodies cartoon
- "Much Ado About Scrooge", DuckTales episode
- "Much Apu About Nothing", The Simpsons episode
- "Much 'I Do' About Nothing", Gossip Girl episode
