= Heart on My Sleeve =

"Heart on My Sleeve" may refer to:

- "Heart on My Sleeve" (Gallagher & Lyle song), 1976 song by Gallagher & Lyle
- "Heart on My Sleeve" (Michael Johns song), 2009 song by Michael Johns, subsequently covered by Olly Murs
- "Heart on My Sleeve" (Ghostwriter977 song), 2023 song by Ghostwriter977
- Heart on My Sleeve (album), by Ella Mai, released in 2022
- Heart on My Sleeve, a 2014 album by Mary Lambert

== See also ==
- "Heart upon My Sleeve", 2019 song by Avicii
