= Journey's End (Boca Grande, Florida) =

- U.S. National Register of Historic Places
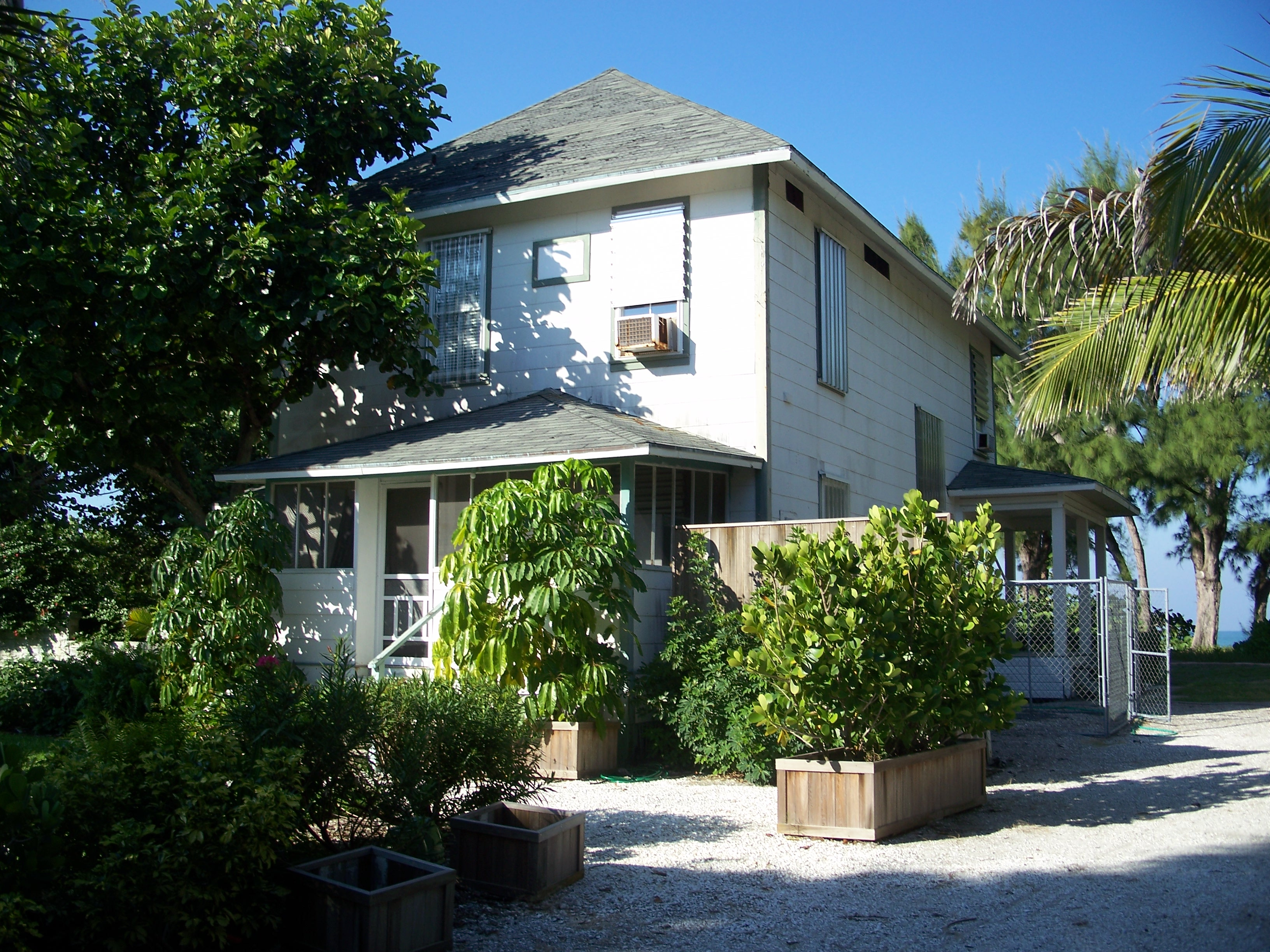

- Location within Florida Location within the United States
- Location: Boca Grande, Florida
- Coordinates: 26°45′44″N 82°15′57″W
- NRHP reference No.: 85000554
- Added to NRHP: March 14, 1985

Journey's End is a historic site in Boca Grande, Florida. It is located on the beachfront at 18th Street. On March 14, 1985, it was added to the U.S. National Register of Historic Places.
