= Friends, Voters, Countrymen =

2001 non-fiction book by Boris Johnson

Friends, Voters, Countrymen: Jottings on the Stump
- First edition
- Author: Boris Johnson
- Language: English
- Genre: Memoir
- Set in: London
- Publisher: HarperCollins
- Publication date: June 2002
- Publication place: United Kingdom
- Media type: Print: hardback octavo
- Pages: 288
- ISBN: 9780007119141
- Followed by: Lend Me Your Ears (2003)

Friends, Voters, Countrymen: Jottings on the Stump is a 2001 book by Boris Johnson. The book recounts Johnson's successful campaign for the seat of Henley in the 2001 general election.

Johnson sold the serialisation rights to the book to The Times despite, according to Johnson's biographer Sonia Purnell, its being the Daily Telegraph under editor Charles Moore which had "rescued and promoted his career". Sarah Sands recalled that Moore was "...furious that Boris had done that. I saw Boris with his head in his hands, saying that the Telegraph had simply not made a good enough offer".

Will Buckley, reviewing the book in The Guardian, wrote that "it is yet another sign of Tory decline that Boris Johnson, brightest of the new intake, has decided to publish his political memoirs within weeks of arriving at Westminster". Buckley was pessimistic regarding Johnson's future political career, writing that "[t]here will be no Cabinet post. There is unlikely to be even a Shadow Cabinet post. His achievement in holding Henley with a reduced majority in the 2001 election may be a highlight. The crunch decision of his political career could well be having to choose between IDS and DD in a leadership contest". Buckley concludes that "[h]is first diary is slight, the election being no more interesting in Henley than elsewhere. But the months and years to come, as our man struggles over whether to accept a job as PPS to Bill Cash and frets over the decline of his once great party, should provide sufficient material to write further diaries which are even more amusing, and insightful, than Clark's."

In the book Johnson is interviewed by Jeremy Paxman, telling him that "he is motivated 30 per cent by public service, 40 per cent by 'sheer egomania' and 30 per cent [by] disapproval of 'swankpot journalists'. Paxman snorts. Johnson writes in his diary: 'He thinks I am being satirical, but I am not entirely – at least not in the point about service.'"

In a 2004 profile of Johnson for Vanity Fair, Michael Wolff described the book as concerning "the ludicrousness and exasperations and low farce of campaigning – a gentle and instructive comedy", and felt it was "surely the best campaign book ever written by a politician".
