= Winter of Discontent (disambiguation) =

The Winter of Discontent refers to the winter of 1978–79 in the United Kingdom, during which there were widespread strikes.

Winter of Discontent or The Winter of Our Discontent may also refer to:

== Arts and entertainment ==
=== Literature ===
- "Now is the Winter of our Discontent", a famous line in Shakespeare's play Richard III
- Winter of Discontent (novel), a 1941 novel by Gilber Frankau
- The Winter of Our Discontent, John Steinbeck's last novel, published in 1961

=== Film and television ===
- Winter of Discontent (film), a 2012 Egyptian drama directed by Ibrahim El Batout
- Winter of Our Discontent (American Horror Story), the eighth episode of the seventh season of TV series American Horror Story, aired in 2017
- The Winter of Our Discontent (Hallmark Hall of Fame), a 1983 television film, based on Steinbeck's novel

=== Music ===
- The Winter of Discontent, a 2006 album by The Generators
- The Winter of Our Discontent (album), a 2003 album by The Echoing Green

== Other uses ==
- Winter of Discontent (US history), a term for the period in United States history from 1950 to 1952, roughly coinciding with the Korean War

== See also ==
- Now Is the Winter of Our Discothèque, 2005 album by Princess Superstar
- "The Winter of Our Monetized Content", 2019 episode of The Simpsons
