= Sara Woods =

British mystery writer (1922–1985)

Lana Hutton Bowen-Judd (7 March 1922 – 6 November 1985) was a British mystery writer, better known under her pseudonym Sara Woods, but using also the pen names of Anne Burton, Mary Challis, and Margaret Leek.

== Biography ==
Born in Bradford, Yorkshire, Woods was educated at the Convent of the Sacred Heart in Filey, Yorkshire.

During World War II, Woods worked in a bank and as a solicitor's clerk in London, where she gained much of the information later used in her novels. As Eileen B Hutton she married Anthony George Bowen-Judd on 25 April 1946, and with him ran a pig breeding farm from 1948 to 1954. In 1957 they moved to Nova Scotia in Canada. There she worked as registrar for St. Mary's University until 1964. In 1961 she wrote her first novel, Bloody Instructions, introducing the hero of forty-nine of her mysteries, Antony Maitland, an English barrister.

Lana Bowen-Judd was a member of the Society of Authors in England, the Authors League of America, the Mystery Writers of America, and the English Crime Writers' Association. She was also instrumental in forming Crime Writers of Canada, serving on its first executive committee.

Her last years were passed with her husband in Niagara-on-the-Lake, Ontario. As Lanna Judd, she died in Toronto, Ontario, Canada, on 6 November 1985.

== Books ==
=== Writing as Sara Woods, featuring Antony Maitland, barrister ===
- Bloody Instructions (1961)
- Malice Domestic (1962)
- Error of the Moon (1963)
- The Taste of Fears (also published as The Third Encounter) (1963)
- The Little Measure (1964)
- Trusted Like the Fox (1964)
- Let's Choose Executors (1965)
- Though I Know She Lies (1965)
- The Windy Side of the Law (1965)
- Enter Certain Murderers (1966)
- And Shame the Devil (1967)
- The Case Is Altered (1967)
- Knives Have Edges (1968)
- Past Praying For (1968)
- Tarry and Be Hanged (1969)
- An Improbable Fiction (1970)
- The Knavish Crows (1971)
- Serpent's Tooth (1971)
- They Love Not Poison (1972)
- Enter the Corpse (1973)
- Yet She Must Die (1973)
- Done to Death (1974)
- A Show of Violence (1975)
- My Life Is Done (1976)
- The Law's Delay (1977)
- A Thief or Two (1977)
- Exit Murderer (1978)
- Proceed to Judgement (1979)
- This Fatal Writ (1979)
- They Stay for Death (1980)
- Weep for Her (1980)
- Cry Guilty (1981)
- Dearest Enemy (1981)
- Enter a Gentlewoman (1982)
- Most Grievous Murder (1982)
- Villains by Necessity (1982)
- Call Back Yesterday (1983)
- The Lie Direct (1983)
- Where Should He Die? (1983)
- The Bloody Book of Law (1984)
- Defy the Devil (1984)
- Murder's out of Tune (1984)
- Away with Them to Prison (1985)
- An Obscure Grave (1985)
- Put Out the Light (1985)
- Most Deadly Hate (1986)
- Nor Live So Long (1986)
- Naked Villainy (1987)

=== Writing as Mary Challis, featuring Jeremy Locke ===
- Burden of Proof (1980)
- Crimes Past (1980)
- The Ghost of an Idea (1981)
- A Very Good Hater (1981)

=== Writing as Anne Burton, featuring Richard Trenton ===
- The Dear Departed (1980)
- Where There's a Will (1980)
- Worse Than a Crime (1981)

=== Writing as Margaret Leek, featuring Anne Marryat (assisted by her husband, Stephen) ===
- The Healthy Grave (1980)
- We Must Have a Trial (1980)
- Voice of the Past (1981)
