= The dogs of war (phrase) =

Phrase from William Shakespeare's play Julius Caesar

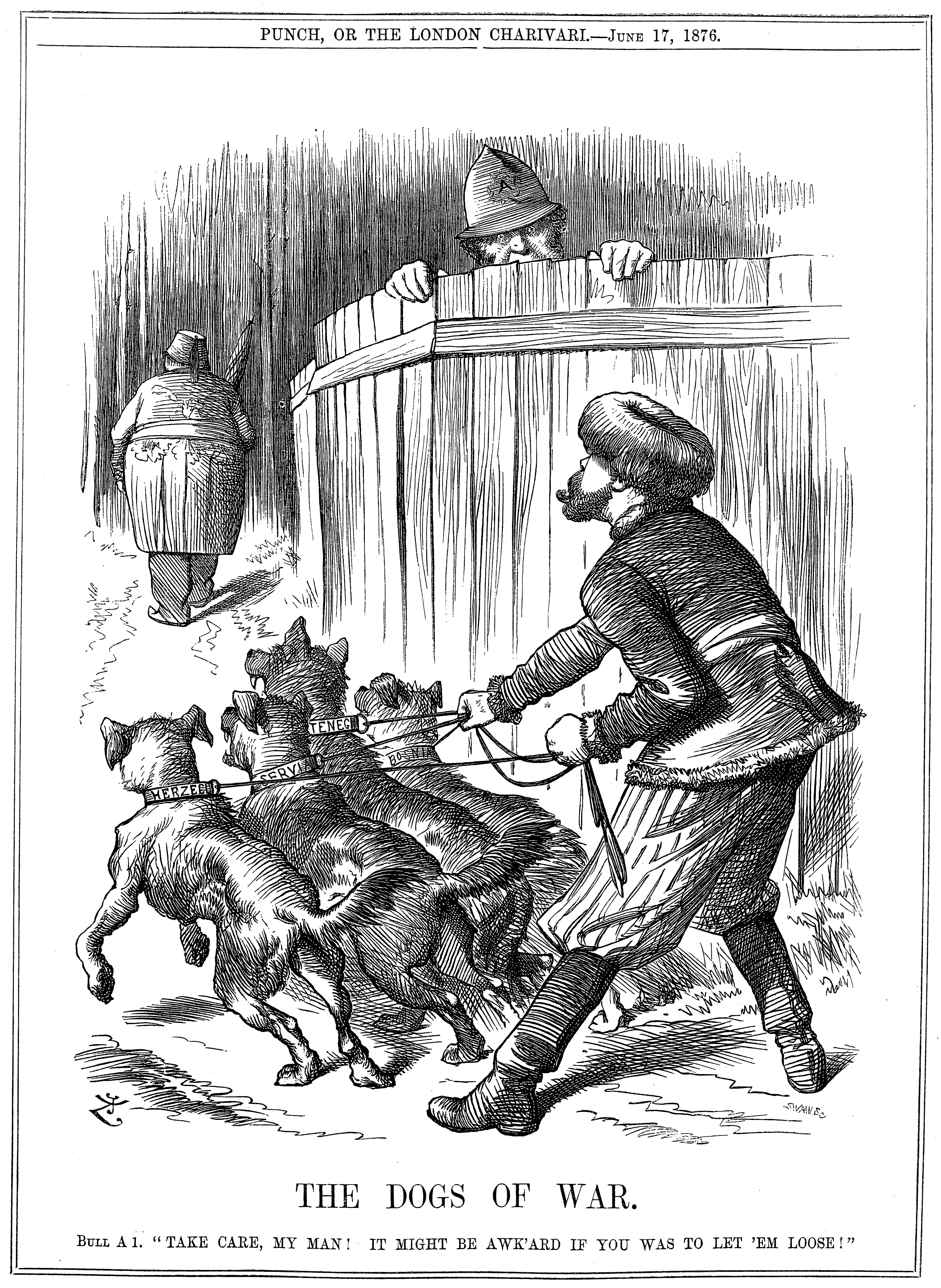
Punch cartoon from 17 June 1876. The Russian Empire preparing to let slip the "Dogs of War" and its imminent engagement in the growing Balkan conflict between Slavic states and the Ottoman Empire, while the policeman John Bull (Britain) warns Russia to take care. The Slavic states of Serbia and Montenegro declared war on the Ottoman Empire two weeks later.

The dogs of war is a phrase spoken by Mark Antony in Act 3, Scene 1, line 273 of William Shakespeare's play Julius Caesar: "Cry 'Havoc!', and let slip the dogs of war."

== Synopsis ==
In the scene, Mark Antony is alone with Julius Caesar's body, shortly after Caesar's assassination. In a soliloquy, he reveals his intention to incite the crowd at Caesar's funeral to rise up against the assassins. Foreseeing violence throughout Rome, Antony even imagines Caesar's spirit joining in the exhortations: "raging for revenge, with Ate by his side come hot from hell, shall in these confines with a Monarch's voice cry 'Havoc!' and let slip the dogs of war."

== Interpretation ==
In a literal reading, "dogs" are the familiar animals, trained for warfare; "havoc" is a military order permitting the seizure of spoil after a victory; and "let slip" is to release from the leash. Shakespeare's source for Julius Caesar was The Life of Marcus Brutus from Plutarch's Lives, and the concept of the war dog appears in that work, in the section devoted to the ancient Greek warrior Aratus of Sicyon.

Apart from the literal meaning, a parallel can be drawn with the prologue to Henry V, where the warlike king is described as having at his heels "famine, sword and fire", like hounds awaiting employment.

Along those lines, an alternative proposed meaning is that "the dogs of war" refers figuratively to the wild pack of soldiers "let slip" by war's breakdown of civilized behaviour and/or their commanders' orders to wreak "havoc", i.e., rape, pillage, and plunder.

In another interpretation, employing the meaning of "dog" in its mechanical sense ("any of various usually simple mechanical devices for holding, gripping, or fastening that consist of a spike, bar, or hook"), the "dogs" are "let slip" as an act of releasing. Thus, the "dogs of war" are the political and societal restraints against war that operate during times of peace.

== In popular culture ==
The phrase has entered so far into general usage that it is now regarded as a cliché, according to the lexicographer Eric Partridge.

Victor Hugo uses "dogs of war" as a metaphor for cannon fire in chapter XIV of Les Misérables:

Another cannonade was audible at some distance. At the same time that the two guns were furiously attacking the redoubt from the Rue de la Chanvrerie, two other cannons, trained one from the Rue Saint-Denis, the other from the Rue Aubry-le-Boucher, were riddling the Saint-Merry barricade. The four cannons echoed each other mournfully. The barking of these sombre dogs of war replied to each other.

The Troy University Marching Band announcer reads the passage as part of the band's pregame show at every home football game.

== See also ==
- List of titles of works based on Shakespearean phrases § Julius Caesar
- List of idioms attributed to Shakespeare

== Bibliography ==
- Shakespeare, William (2007). Bate, Jonathan; Rasmussen, Eric (eds.). The RSC [Royal Shakespeare Company] Complete Works. London, GBR: Palgrave Macmillan. ISBN 978-0230003514.
- Shakespere, William (1843) [1623]. "Julius Cæsar, Notes". In Cornwall, Barry; others (eds.). The Works of Shakespere, Revised From the Best Authorities: With a Memoir, and Essay on His Genius by Barry Cornwall. Also, Annotations and Introductory Remarks on the Plays, by Many Distinguished Writers. Vol. II: Tragedies. Illustrated with Engravings on Wood, from Designs by Kenny Meadows. London, GBR: Robert Tyas. p. 517. OCLC 57461190. "In military operations of old, the word 'havock; signified that no quarter should be given. By the 'dogs of war,' are probably meant famine, sword, and fire. As in 'KING HENRY V.:'— 'Leashed in like hounds, should famine, sword, and fire, Crouch for employment.' ... [SINGER]." Note: The "Notes" for "Julius Cæsar" chapter in the Cornwall edition close with the signature "SINGER.", apparently referring to contributions based on the work of Samuel Weller Singer.
