= Heavy Is the Head =

Heavy Is the Head may refer to:

- "Heavy Is the Head" (Agents of S.H.I.E.L.D.), a 2014 episode of Agents of S.H.I.E.L.D.
- Heavy Is the Head (album), a 2019 album by British rapper Stormzy
- Heavy Is the Head (EP), a 2012 EP by American rapper Marv Won
- "Heavy Is the Head" (Scandal), an episode of the American television series Scandal
- "Heavy Is the Head" (song), a 2015 song by Zac Brown Band

== See also ==
- Heavy Lies the Crown (disambiguation)
- Heavy Is the Crown (disambiguation)
