= Something Wicked =

Something Wicked may refer to:

== Film and television ==
- Something Wicked (2014 film), an American psychological horror film
- Something Wicked (2017 film), a Nigerian drama film
- "Something Wicked" (The Alienist), a 2020 television episode
- "Something Wicked" (Highlander), a 1996 television episode
- "Something Wicked" (Supernatural), a 2006 television episode

== Literature ==
- Something Wicked (book), a 1988 novel by Carolyn Hart
- Something Wicked (comics), a British comic book series
- Something Wicked (magazine), a South African magazine

== Music ==
- Something Wicked (album), by Nuclear Assault, 1993
- Something Wicked, an EP by One-Eyed Doll, 2017
- "Something Wicked" (song), by Breaking Benjamin, 2026
- "Something Wicked", a song by British Sea Power from The Decline of British Sea Power, 2003
- "Something Wicked", a song by Starset from Horizons, 2021
- "Something Wicked", a song by Tupac Shakur from 2Pacalypse Now, 1991

== Other uses ==
- "Something Wicked", a Lockheed F-117A Nighthawk shot down in 1999 over Serbia

== See also ==
- Something Wicked Saga, a story featured in the works of Jon Schaffer of the band Iced Earth
- Something Wicked This Way Comes (disambiguation)
