= Something Wicked This Way Comes =

"Something wicked this way comes" is a line spoken by a witch in William Shakespeare's play Macbeth.

Something Wicked This Way Comes may also refer to:

== Film, television, and theatre ==
- Something Wicked This Way Comes (film), a 1983 American film
- "Something Wicked This Way Comes" (Joan of Arcadia), a 2005 television episode
- "Something Wicked This Way Comes" (Project Runway All Stars), a 2014 television episode
- "Something Wicked This Way Comes" (Ugly Betty), a 2007 television episode
- Something Wicked This Way Comes (stage show), a 2005–2006 stage show by Derren Brown

== Music ==
=== Albums and EPs ===
- Something Wicked This Way Comes (Cheyne album), 2004
- Something Wicked This Way Comes (The Herbaliser), 2002
- Something Wicked This Way Comes (Iced Earth album), 1998
- Something Wicked This Way Comes, by Eibon la Furies, 2006
- Something Wicked This Way Comes, by the Enid, 1983
- Something Wicked This Way Comes, by Thunderstick, 2017
- Something Wicked This Way Comes (Cold EP), 2000
- Somethin' Wicked This Way Comes, by Wolfpac, 1999

=== Songs ===
- "Something Wicked This Way Comes", by Barry Adamson from Oedipus Schmoedipus, 1996
- "Something Wicked This Way Comes", by Doro from Doro, 1990
- "Something Wicked This Way Comes", by Lordi from To Beast or Not to Beast, 2013
- "Something Wicked This Way Comes", by Lucinda Williams from Down Where the Spirit Meets the Bone, 2014
- "Something Wicked This Way Comes", by Redemption from Redemption, 2003
- "Something Wicked (This Way Comes)", by Siouxsie & the Banshees, B-side of "The Killing Jar", 1988
- "Something Wicked This Way Comes", by Wednesday 13 from Calling All Corpses, 2011
- "Sumthin' Wicked This Way Comes", by TLC from CrazySexyCool, 1994

== Other uses ==
- Something Wicked This Way Comes (novel), a 1962 novel by Ray Bradbury
- "Something Wicked This Way Comes", a 1997 promotional tagline for the second-generation Lexus GS car line

== See also ==
- Something Wicked (disambiguation)
- Something Bitchin' This Way Comes, a 1989 album by Lock Up
- Something Green and Leafy This Way Comes, a 1993 album by SNFU
- "Something Ricked This Way Comes", an episode of Rick and Morty
- "Something Wall-Mart This Way Comes", an episode of South Park
- "Something Wicca This Way Comes", an episode of Charmed
