= What Dreams May Come =

"What dreams may come" is a quote from the "To be, or not to be" soliloquy from the play Hamlet by William Shakespeare.

"What Dreams May Come" may refer to:

- What Dreams May Come, an 1888 novel by Gertrude Atherton
- What Dreams May Come, a 1934 short story by Walter de la Mare
- What Dreams May Come, a 1941 novel by J. D. Beresford
- What Dreams May Come (Matheson novel), a 1978 fantasy novel by Richard Matheson
  - What Dreams May Come (film), a 1998 adaptation of the novel
- What Dreams May Come (Wellman novel), a 1983 supernatural detective novel by Manly Wade Wellman
- "What Dreams May Come," a 1998 episode of the animated TV series Godzilla: The Series
