= Perchance to Dream (disambiguation) =

"Perchance to Dream" is a phrase from the "To be, or not to be" soliloquy spoken by Shakespeare's Hamlet. The words have been used as a title for:

== Literature ==
- Perchance to Dream, a 1935 novel by Mary Lutyens
- "Perforce to Dream", a short story in the 1954 collection Jizzle by John Wyndham
- Perchance to Dream (novel), a 1991 Philip Marlowe novel by Robert B. Parker
- Perchance to Dream, a 1991 Star Trek: The Next Generation novel by Howard Weinstein
- "Perchance to Dream", a 1996 essay by Jonathan Franzen, later retitled "Why Bother?"
- Star Trek: The Next Generation – Perchance to Dream, a Star Trek four-issue comic book limited series published by WildStorm (February–May 2000)
- A Nightmare on Elm Street: Perchance to Dream, a 2006 novel by Natasha Rhodes

== Music ==
- "Perchance to Dream", track 2 from the 1987 album Something of Time by Nightnoise
- "Perchance to Dream", a song from the 2000 album Loveboat by Erasure
- "Perchance to Dream", track 20 from the 2002 album Halo Original Soundtrack
- "Perchance to Dream...", an album by John Zorn

== Stage productions ==
- Perchance to Dream (musical), a 1945 English musical by Ivor Novello

== Television ==
- "Perchance to Dream" (Twilight Zone episode), a first-season 1959 episode of the TV series
- "Purr-Chance to Dream", a 1967 Tom and Jerry short
- "Perchance to Dream" (Batman: The Animated Series), a first-season 1992 episode of the animated TV series
- "Perchance to Dean", a fourth season 2009 episode of The Venture Bros.
