= What's in a Name? =

What's in a Name? may refer to:

- Dave Dee, Dozy, Beaky, Mick & Tich (album) (also What's in a Name), the debut self-titled album by Dave Dee, Dozy, Beaky, Mick & Tich
- What's in a Name? (1934 film), a British comedy
- What's in a Name? (2012 film), a French-Belgian comedy
- What's in a Name? (play), a 2010 French comedy
- "What's in a Name?" (short story), a mystery short story by American writer Isaac Asimov
- What's in a Name? (Hercules: The Legendary Journeys), a 1995 TV episode

== See also ==
A rose by any other name would smell as sweet
