= Uncertain Glory =

Uncertain Glory may refer to:

- Uncertain Glory (novel), by the Catalan writer Joan Sales i Vallès
- Uncertain Glory (1944 film), a war crime drama starring Errol Flynn and Paul Lukas
- Uncertain Glory (2017 film), a Spanish drama based on the novel
- An Uncertain Glory: The Contradictions of Modern India, a 2013 book co-authored by Amartya Sen
- The Uncertain Glory, a book by Harriet Lummis Smith
