= All That Glitters =

All That Glitters or All That Glisters may refer to:

- All that glitters is not gold, a well-known saying

== Literature ==
- All That Glitters (novel), by V. C. Andrews
- All That Glitters, a novel by Michael Anthony
- All That Glitters, a memoir by Pearl Lowe
- "All That Glitters", the first part of the Bionicle comic Journey's End
- “ All That Glitters: A Novel Of Washington”, by Frances Parkinson Keyes

== Stage, film and television ==
- All That Glitters is Not Gold, an 1851 comic drama by Thomas Morton and John Maddison Morton
- All That Glitters (1936 film), a British film directed by Maclean Rogers
- All That Glitters (radio serial), a 1939 Australian radio serial
- All That Glitters (2010 film), a French film
- All That Glitters (2026 film), a British coming-of-age film
- All That Glitters, a 2001 film later retitled Glitter
- All That Glitters (American TV series), a 1977 American sitcom
- All That Glitters, a proposed 1984 American series that resulted in Code of Vengeance
- All That Glitters: Britain's Next Jewellery Star, a BBC reality TV series hosted by Katherine Ryan
- All That Glitters (Singaporean TV series), a 2023 Singaporean drama series

=== Episodes ===
- "All That Glitters" (Adventures of Superman)
- "All That Glitters", an episode of Angry Birds Stella
- "All That Glitters" (Ben 10: Alien Force)
- "All That Glitters..." (Eureka)
- "All That Glitters" (Lost in Space)
- "All That Glitters", an episode of Make It or Break It
- "All That Glitters!" (Pokémon: Johto League Champions)
- "All That Glitters..." (Sex and the City)
- "All That Glisters" (Space: 1999)
- "All That Glitters" (SpongeBob SquarePants)

== Music ==
- "All That Glitters", a song by Earl from the album Tongue Tied (2017) which samples the song "My Woman" as recorded by Lew Stone & his Monseigneur Band
- "All That Glitters", a song by Orchestral Manoeuvres in the Dark from the album Sugar Tax
- "All That Glitters", a song by Le Tigre from the EP From the Desk of Mr. Lady
- "All That Glitters Isn't Gold", a song by The Cover Girls from the album We Can't Go Wrong
- "All That Glitters Is a Mares Nest" by Cardiacs
- "All that glitters ain't gold", the refrain of the song "Gold" by Prince

== Gaming ==
- All That Glitters... (module), an adventure module for the Dungeons & Dragons fantasy role-playing game

== See also ==
- "All that is gold does not glitter", a poem by J. R. R. Tolkien
