= Passing Strange (disambiguation) =

Passing Strange is a 2006 rock musical by Stew. An adaptation filmed by Spike Lee was shown at the 2009 Sundance Film Festival.

Passing Strange may also refer to:

- Passing Strange, a 1980 novel by Catherine Aird
- Passing Strange (novella), a 2017 novella by Ellen Klages
- Passing Strange: True Tales of New England Hauntings and Horrors, a book by folklorist Joseph A. Citro

== See also ==
- Passing Stranger (disambiguation)
