= The Evil That Men Do =

The Evil That Men Do may refer to:

- "The evil that men do", a quotation from Act 3, scene ii of Julius Caesar by William Shakespeare

== Literature ==
- The Evil That Men Do, an 1889 novel by Edgar Fawcett
- The Evil That Men Do, a 1904 novel by M. P. Shiel
- The Evil That Men Do, a 1953 novel by Anne Hocking
- The Evil That Men Do, a 1966 novel by Judson Philips, writing as Hugh Pentecost
- The Evil That Men Do, a 1969 novel by John Brunner
- The Evil That Men Do, a 1978 novel by R. Lance Hill
- The Evil That Men Do, a 1993 novel by Alanna Knight
- The Evil That Men Do, a 1999 non-fiction book co-authored by retired FBI profiler Roy Hazelwood
- The Evil That Men Do (Buffy novel), a 2000 novel based on the television series Buffy the Vampire Slayer by Nancy Holder
- Spider-Man/Black Cat: The Evil That Men Do, a 2002-06 comic book limited series written by Kevin Smith and published by Marvel Comics
- The Evil That Men Do, a 2008 novel by Dave White

== Cinema ==
- The Evil That Men Do (film), 1984 film starring Charles Bronson

== Music ==
- "The Evil That Men Do" (song), by Iron Maiden on Seventh Son of a Seventh Son
- "Evil That Men Do", a song by Queen Latifah on All Hail the Queen
- "The Evil That Men Do", a song by Yo La Tengo on Ride the Tiger

== Television ==
- "The Evil That Men Do", Bergerac series 9, episode 4 (1991)
- "The Evil That Men Do", Casualty series 23, episode 8 (2008)
- "The Evil That Men Do", La Femme Nikita season 5, episode 6 (2001)
- "The Evil That Men Do", The Virginian season 2, episode 5 (1963)
