= A Midsummer Night's Gene =

1997 novel by Andrew Harman

- First edition
- Author: Andrew Harman
- Language: English
- Genre: Science fiction
- Publisher: Legend
- Publication date: 1997
- Publication place: United Kingdom
- Media type: Print (Hardcover)
- Pages: 288
- ISBN: 0-09-978871-3
- OCLC: 43236604

A Midsummer Night's Gene is a comedy science fiction novel written by Andrew Harman and published in 1997 by Random House. The novel is loosely based on Shakespeare's play A Midsummer Night's Dream.

Set in modern Britain, its plot concerns laboratory-engineered gene mutation at the Splice of Life Patentable Biosciences lab and the chaos that follows when it goes wrong.
