= Pound of Flesh =

Pound of Flesh may refer to:

- A "pound of flesh", the security demanded on a loan by Shylock in Shakespeare's The Merchant of Venice
- A similar arrangement in the 14th century Il Pecorone
- Pound of Flesh (2015 film), starring Jean-Claude Van Damme
- Pound of Flesh (2010 film), starring Malcolm McDowell
- "Pound of Flesh", an episode of the 2009 TV series V

== See also ==
- A Pound of Flesh for 50p, a 2014 art installation by Alex Chinneck
