= Sleep No More =

Sleep No More may refer to:

- Sleep No More (1944 play), co-written by Lee Loeb
- Sleep No More (2011 play), performed since 2011 in New York City
- Sleep No More (2009 play)
- Sleep No More (film), upcoming fantasy horror film by Edwin
- Sleep No More (novel), a 2002 novel by Greg Iles
- Sleep No More (anthology), a 1944 anthology edited by August Derleth
- Sleep No More (The Comsat Angels album), 1981
- Sleep No More (DJ Signify album), 2004
- Sleep No More (Jack Savoretti album), 2016
- "Sleep No More" (Doctor Who), an episode of the ninth series of Doctor Who
- Sleep No More (Shameless), an episode of the American TV series Shameless
- "Sleep No More," an episode from the fifth season of Arthur
- Sleep No More, a 1948 collection of supernatural horror stories by L. T. C. Rolt
- Sleep No More, a 1966 book by George Sims as Paul Cain (pen name)
- "Sleep no more!", a quotation from Act II, Scene 2, of Macbeth
