= Such Tweet Sorrow =

Twitter adaptation of Romeo and Juliet

Such Tweet Sorrow was a modern-day adaptation of Shakespeare's Romeo and Juliet in tweets. During the period of five weeks (April 10, 2010 – May 12, 2010) six professional actors performed the play on Twitter and other web devices. The actors improvised around a prepared story grid and could interact with each other and react to followers, fans, real events and comments via Twitter. The play was a cooperation between the Royal Shakespeare Company and the Mudlark Production Company.

== Plot ==
The story of Romeo and Juliet's love is taken to the 21st century and is set in an unknown town in Great Britain. The feud between the Montagues and the Capulets begins in 2000, when Susan Capulet, Juliet's mother, is killed in a car crash. The driver, Montague Sr., survives with heavy injuries. Mr. Capulet, a successful property developer, was left with three children: Jess, Tybalt and Juliet. He remarried in 2002. Montague Sr., a landscape painter, still lives in the area with his wife and son. Ten years later, Juliet is the only child still living at home. Her older sister, Jess, whose nickname 'Nurse' comes from nursing her younger siblings, lives and works as a trainee solicitor in a nearby town. Their brother, Tybalt, lives two hours away in a public school. He has been sent to boarding schools since the age of 7 and has never settled in any of them. Jess, as the oldest, tries to keep the family together and has close contact with her father and sister, along with her brother, who Jess struggles to communicate with.

== Characterization ==
=== Romeo Montague ===
Romeo is a 19-year-old who takes every day as it comes. He wants to make the best out of everything he does and is enjoying his life at home as an only child. After passing all of his final exams at school, he decides to take a year off and works part-time at a cardboard factory. He does not seem to have many close friends besides Mercutio, but is enjoying the moments with him to the fullest. He seems very quiet at first but is definitely an eye-catcher. Although Montague Sr. never told him to, he dislikes the Capulets for what they did to his family.

=== Mercutio ===
He is not the handsomest 19-year-old, but one of the most charming. He uses this talent to seduce girls and to get away with most of the things he does, but if this doesn't work out, he sure knows how to use his fists. He is an only child, and his parents moved to south France when he turned 18. They bought him an apartment in the city and he gets a decent allowance every month. After school, he decided to take a year off (like Romeo) and spends most of the time with him and the Montagues. He is very loyal to them and wishes to be part of the family.

=== Juliet Capulet ===
A shy, gentle 15-year-old girly girl who likes to stay at home and hang out with her sister Jess, who is also her best friend. She is very innocent and seems to have little experience with anything to do with the real world. She likes singing and making music on her guitar. Other than that, she is a typical teen and enjoys Twilight and Robert Pattinson. Her father is very strict and she is not allowed much, but she obeys him, using her room as a safe place. She doesn't seem to be very popular and doesn't have so many friends besides her sister. As she was still too young to know about the events going on, the feud between the Capulets and the Montagues seems strange to her.

=== Jess Capulet ===
She is a 23-year-old trainee solicitor at a corporate law firm. She is very driven and hardworking. She always has a project going on and is always taking on extra work. Currently she is training for the London Marathon. Since their mother died, she has cared for her younger siblings, earning her the nickname 'nurse'. She lives on her own and has a small apartment in a nearby town. She tries to keep the family together and keeps close contact to her sister, dad, and brother. As the oldest, she has the most memories of their mother, and still blames Montague Sr. for her death.

=== Tybalt Capulet ===
At the age of seven, his mother died, and his dad remarried hastily before he was shipped off to boarding school. He's consistently angry at everybody in his family and at life ever since. But most of all, he is angry at Montague Sr., who he thinks is to blame for all this mess. Without him, the accident would have never happened and his mother would still be alive. Other than that, he portrays this anger within his behavior in school, where he is about to be expelled. The only place he seems to calm down is at Laurence's coffee shop. Laurence seems like a mentor to him but, he also provides him with dope. If it was not for that, Tybalt would have nowhere to go.

=== Laurence Friar ===
A 38-year-old coffee/internet shop owner, Laurence tries to do good and offer help to the local teens, but he's also a local drug dealer and sells them dope. He tries to help the community by supporting the young people and giving them a safe haven with his coffee shop to hang out and have fun. He grew up in this town and knows how it is to live in the rural area, so he tries to give the teens a place to stay instead of the streets. He also supports the local disabled group and arranges gatherings for the local youth, like his ping pong tournament. Before Montague Sr.'s car crash, Laurence and he were friends. Nowadays, he tries to loosen the tension between the two families and help the young couple to sort things out.

== Realization/form ==
The actors all performed on Twitter using small comments with 140 characters (tweets) to tell their followers what they were up to. Although other internet platforms, Facebook, Xboxlive, Audioboo, YouTube and WordPress were used too, Twitter as the main media was even more useful to perform as the people who were interested in seeing this event could just follow the characters or even just their favorite one. The actors improvised around a prepared story grid and were free to interpret the events in their own way using their own words. The feature that came out of this was a live story-telling situation which could definitely also be based on real events. Followers who tuned in later could have always had the impression they're following somebody's real-life story. This resembles Orson Welles War of the Worlds being read on the radio back in the days. The result was the same. The other media represented, such as YouTube, were used to simply support the tweets in a more striking way. Juliets video posts on YouTube had the function of showing her as a real person with a real voice and also to simply describe her character and her environment. The fact that Romeo was really found playing Call of Duty on Xboxlive made the realness of the character even more profound as you could actually join him in his game. The variety of the media usage made it easier for the followers to connect to the characters and certainly displayed the variety of streams used by the youth of the 21st century. This made it possible to take the story of Romeo and Juliet to modern times and to get a younger generation more interested in Shakespearean literature.
