= Heavy Lies the Crown =

Heavy Lies the Crown may also refer to:

== Music ==
=== Albums ===
- Heavy Lies the Crown, by Godsized, 2015
- Heavy Lies the Crown (album), by Army of the Pharaohs, 2014
- Heavy Lies the Crown, by Zen Robbi, 2010
- Heavy Lies the Crown, by Full Blown Chaos, 2007

=== Songs ===
- "Heavy Lies the Crown", by Doomriders from the album Darkness Come Alive, 2009
- "Heavy Lies the Crown", by Draconian from the album Sovran, 2015
- "Heavy Lies the Crown", by In Fear and Faith from the album Imperial, 2010
- "Heavy Lies the Crown", by A Loss for Words from The Kids Can't Lose, 2009
- "Heavy Lies the Crown", by King 810 from the album La Petite Mort or a Conversation with God, 2016
- "Heavy Lies the Crown", by Machine Head from the album Catharsis, 2018
- "Heavy Lies the Crown", by Orange Goblin from Back from the Abyss, 2014
- "Heavy Lies the Crown", by The Scene Aesthetic from their self-titled album, 2006
- "Heavy Lies the Crown", by The Showdown from the album Blood in the Gears, 2010
- "Heavy Lies the Crown", by Maximum Love, 2023

== Other uses ==
- "Heavy Lies the Crown", an episode of the television series The 100

== See also ==
- Heavy Is the Head (disambiguation)
- Heavy Is the Crown (disambiguation)
