= Too, Too Solid Flesh =

1989 novel by Nick O'Donohoe

Too, Too Solid Flesh is a cyberpunk murder mystery novel by Nick O'Donohoe. It was published by TSR in 1989.

== Synopsis ==
In a dystopian future, Capek the roboticist builds a troupe of androids specifically to perform Hamlet. When he is murdered, the Prince Hamlet android decides to investigate.

== Reception ==
Dragon commended O'Donohoe's portrayal of the "characters [as] true both to their theatrical roles and their larger personalities", stating that the novel was "among the most thoughtful examinations of roles and role-playing", but noted that readers unfamiliar with Shakespeare may be confused. Io9 included it on a list of "coolest Shakespeare riffs in science fiction and fantasy". Shakespearean scholar Todd Borlik compared it to Philip K. Dick's Do Androids Dream of Electric Sheep, with "a genuine philosophical intelligence belied by its pulp fiction exterior", lauding O'Donohoe for having "ingeniously retool(ed)" Hamlet in order to "exalt the post-human"; Borlik also noted the dramatic irony of Horatio being a human pretending to be an android who had infiltrated a troupe of androids pretending to be humans, and then being unable to pass.
