= Strange bedfellows =

Strange Bedfellows may refer to:

== Films ==
- Strange Bedfellows (1965 film)
- The Strange Bedfellow, a 1986 Hong Kong film directed by Alfred Cheung
- Strange Bedfellows (2004 film)

== TV episodes ==
- "Strange Bedfellows", an episode of Columbo
- Strange Bedfellows (Star Trek: Deep Space Nine), an episode of Star Trek: Deep Space Nine
- Strange Bedfellows (The Drew Carey Show), an episode of The Drew Carey Show
- Strange Bedfellows (The Golden Girls), an episode of The Golden Girls
- Strange Bedfellows (Oz), an episode of Oz
- "Strange Bedfellows", an episode of Shark
- Strange Bedfellows (ER), an episode of ER
- Strange Bedfellows (Cheers), an episode of Cheers
- "Strange Bedfellows", an episode of Three's Company
- "Strange Bedfellows", an episode of Naruto Shippuden
- Strange Bedfellows (Big Love), an episode of the American TV series Big Love

== Other uses ==
- Strange Bedfellows (play), a 1947 Broadway comedy by Florence Ryerson and Colin Clement
- Strange Bedfellows (Angel comic), a trade paperback collecting comic stories based on the Angel television series
- Strange Bedfellows (graphic novel), 2025 graphic novel by Ariel Slamet Ries
