= Where Eagles Dare (disambiguation) =

Where Eagles Dare is a 1968 war adventure film, based on the 1967 novel of the same name by Alistair MacLean.

Where Eagles Dare also may refer to:

- "Where Eagles Dare" (Misfits song), a song by the Misfits from their 1979 single "Night of the Living Dead"
- "Where Eagles Dare", a song by Iron Maiden from their 1983 album Piece of Mind
- "Where Eagles Dare", a song by Harry Mudie and King Tubby from their 1978 album Harry Mudie Meet King Tubby In Dub Conference Vol.3
