= Cliffhanger (band) =

Dutch progressive rock band

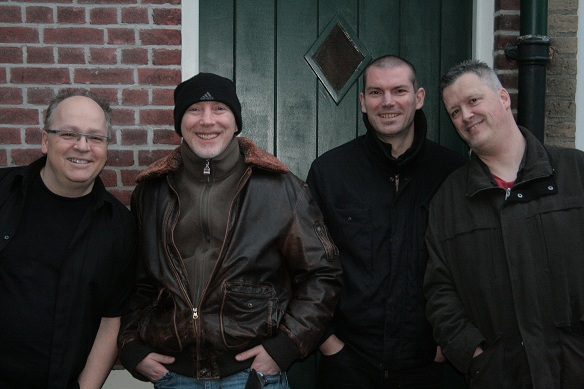
- Cliffhanger in 2012

Background information
- Origin: Tilburg, Netherlands
- Genres: Progressive rock Psychedelic rock Art rock
- Years active: 1993–2001, 2004, 2011–2013
- Labels: SI-Music / Musea / Labrad'or / Freia Music
- Past members: From left to right: Hans Boonk; Gijs Koopman; Dick Heijboer; Rinie Huigen
- Website: Official Cliffhanger website (archived)

Cliffhanger (1993–2001) was a Dutch progressive rock band.

== Biography ==
The band was founded in 1993 by keyboard player Dick Heijboer. Right from the start the band decided to play music in the tradition of old school Genesis, Yes, King Crimson, Van Der Graaf Generator and Emerson, Lake & Palmer. Important was the use of “vintage instruments” such as Moog Taurus Bass Pedals, Hammond organ, Moog synthesizers and Rickenbacker bass guitar.

In 1995 their debut album Cold Steel saw the light, one year later followed by their second album Not to Be or Not to Be which had a more concept like approach. After the 3rd album “Mirror Site” the band split up for 1.5 year. During that period “Hope and Despair” was released which contained live recordings of songs which didn't appear on previous albums.

In 1999 the band was re-founded. The next year, the final album Circle was released. Due to musical differences the band decided to split up again. Dick Heijboer decided to move on with a solo project called “NovoX” with all Cliffhanger members, including newcomer Mark Vermeule. An album called NovoX was released in 2004. Bass player Gijs Koopman and Guitarist/vocalist Rinie Huigen appeared later in Knight Area.

In 2011, founder member Dick Heijboer worked on an audio DVD Dug Out Alive which contains all demo's, various live concerts and out-takes from the period 1993–2001.

During 2013, their debut album Cold Steel was re-issued with bonus tracks on the Dutch Label Freia Music.

== Discography ==
Album title	Year	Label
Cold Steel	1995	SI Music
Not to be or Not to be	1996	Musea
Mirror Site	1997	Musea
Hope and despair	1998	LaBraD'or
The Reading room, (1 track, various artists)	2000	LaBraD'or
Circle	2000	Musea
NovoX	2004	Musea
Dug Out Alive 1993–2001 (audio DVD)	2011	Independent
Cold Steel (remaster, 2 CD)	2013	Freia Music

== Members ==
- Rinie Huigen – Vocals/Guitars
- Dick Heijboer – Keyboards
- Gijs Koopman – Bass/Moog Taurus bass pedals
- Hans Boonk – Drums
