= The quality of mercy =

Speech in The Merchant of Venice

"The quality of mercy" is a speech given by Portia in William Shakespeare's The Merchant of Venice (act 4, scene 1). In the speech, Portia, disguised as a lawyer, begs Shylock to show mercy to Antonio. The speech extols the power of mercy, "an attribute to God Himself".

The quality of mercy is not strain'd.
It droppeth as the gentle rain from heaven
Upon the place beneath. It is twice blest:
It blesseth him that gives and him that takes.
'Tis mightiest in the mightiest; it becomes
The thronèd monarch better than his crown.
His sceptre shows the force of temporal power,
The attribute to awe and majesty
Wherein doth sit the dread and fear of kings;
But mercy is above this sceptered sway.
It is enthronèd in the hearts of kings;
It is an attribute to God Himself;
And earthly power doth then show likest God's
When mercy seasons justice. Therefore, Jew,
Though justice be thy plea, consider this:
That in the course of justice none of us
Should see salvation. We do pray for mercy,
And that same prayer doth teach us all to render
The deeds of mercy. I have spoke thus much
To mitigate the justice of thy plea,
Which, if thou follow, this strict court of Venice
Must needs give sentence 'gainst the merchant there.

— Portia, in William Shakespeare, The Merchant of Venice, act 4, scene 1

== Critical commentary ==
Portia, disguised as young lawyer Balthazar, begs Shylock for mercy after travelling from the fictional town of Belmont to Venice. Mercy and forgiveness are recurring themes in Shakespeare. According to Theodore Meron, Shakespeare presented mercy as a quality valuable to the most powerful people in a society.

Harold Fisch argued that the words of Deuteronomy 32:2, "My doctrine shall drop as the rain, my speech shall distil as the dew; as the small rain upon the tender grass, and as the showers upon the herb," were echoed in the first words of the speech, "The quality of mercy is not strained. / It droppeth as the gentle rain from heaven / Upon the place beneath."
