= Full Fathom Five =

Full Fathom Five may refer to:

== Shakespeare ==
- The verse passage "Ariel's Song" from Shakespeare's The Tempest
- "Full Fathom Five", a 1611 setting by Robert Johnson of Shakespeare's lyrics
- "Full Fathom Five", a setting of "Ariel's Song" in Three Shakespeare Songs by Ralph Vaughan Williams

== Arts and entertainment ==
=== Film and television ===
- Full Fathom Five (film), 1990
- "Full Fathom Five", a 1953 episode of the TV series Victory at Sea
- "Full Fathom Five," a 1968 episode of the original Hawaii Five-O
- "Full Fathom Five", a 1976 episode of TV series Movin' On
- "Full Fathom Five", an episode of 1972 TV series The Adventurer
- "Full Fathom Five", an episode of 2018 TV series Lodge 49

=== Music ===
- Full Fathom Five (band)
- Full Fathom Five (album), by Clutch, 2008
  - Full Fathom Five: Video Field Recordings, by Clutch, 2008
- Full Fathom Five, a 1994 album by Sub Sub
- "Full Fathom Five", a song by Marianne Faithfull from the 1965 album Come My Way
- "Full Fathom Five", a song by Pete Seeger from the 1966 album Dangerous Songs!?
- "Full Fathom Five", a song by Susie Ibarra, Wadada Leo Smith and John Zorn from the 2003 album 50th Birthday Celebration Volume 8
- "Full Fathom Five", a song by Seaman Dan from the 2003 album Sailing Home
- "Full Fathom Five", a song by Méav Ní Mhaolchatha from the 2002 album Silver Sea
- "Full Fathom Five", an art song from The Michael Nyman Songbook, 1992
- "Full Fathom Five", a B-side variation of "Elephant Stone" by The Stone Roses, 1988
- "Full Fathom Five", a 1922 composition by Martin Shaw
- "Full Fathom Five", a 1923 song composition by Ernest Walker
- "Full Fathom Five", a 2014 composition by Errollyn Wallen for the Melodia Women's Choir
- "Full Fathom Five", a 1972 cantata by Shena Fraser
- "Full Fathom Five", a 2014 choral composition by Jaakko Mäntyjärvi
- "Full Fathom Five", a 2012 opera composition by Thomas Adès
- "Full Fathom Five", a c. 1890 part song composition by Charles Wood
- "Full Fathom Five", a song composition by John Ireland (1879–1962)
- "Full Fathom Five", a 2019 song by Masayoshi Soken for the game Final Fantasy XIV: Shadowbringers

=== Literature ===
- Full Fathom Five, a 1956 novel by Hugh Sykes Davies
- Full Fathom Five, a 1958 novel by Lew Dietz
- Full Fathom Five, a 1965 novel by John Stewart Carter
- Full Fathom Five, a 1968 novel by J. E. Macdonnell in the Horwitz Naval Series
- Full Fathom Five, a 2003 novel by Kate Humphrey
- Full Fathom Five, a 2014 novel by Max Gladstone
- Full Fathom Five: Ocean Warming and a Father’s Legacy, a 2013 book by Gordon Waterman Chaplin
- Full Fathom Five, a 1993 poetry collection John Kinsella
- "Full Fathom Five", a poem by Sylvia Plath from The Colossus and Other Poems, 1960
- "Full Fathom Five", a poem by Samuel Menashe

=== Other uses in arts and entertainment ===
- Full Fathom Five, a 1947 painting by Jackson Pollock
- "Full Fathom Five" (audio drama), in the Doctor Who Unbound series
- Full Fathom Five, a work public art in Somerset
- Full Fathom Five, a 1932 play by Lewis Gielgud
- The Fathom Five Matter, a five-part episode of the radio program Yours Truly, Johnny Dollar, which originally aired in February 1956. In the case, the Fathom Five is the name of a boat which sank under mysterious circumstances. The original quote is referenced throughout the case.

== Other uses ==
- Full Fathom Five, a publishing company owned by James Frey

== See also ==
- Fathom (disambiguation)
- Rich and Strange, a 1931 Hitchcock film, the title being an allusion to words of Ariel's song
- Fathom Five (novel), by Robert Westall, 1979
- Fathom Five (comics), a Marvel Comics character
- Fathom Five National Marine Park, in Georgian Bay, Ontario, Canada
- "The Fathom-Five Matter", a 1956 episode of radio drama episode of Yours Truly, Johnny Dollar
- "Five Fathoms", a song by Everything but the Girl from the 1999 album Temperamental
