= New and Selected Poems =

New and Selected Poems can refer to:

- New and Selected Poems, a 1992 collection of poems by Mary Oliver (volume two with the same title was released in 2005)
- New and Selected Poems, a 2004 collection of poems by Czesław Miłosz
- New and Selected Poems, a 2005 collection of poems by Samuel Menashe
