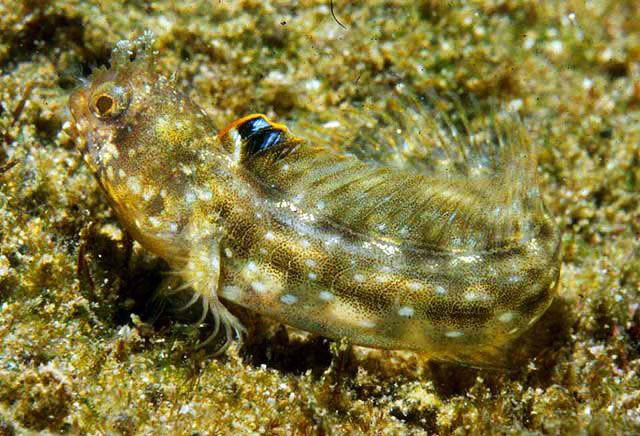

Conservation status
- Least Concern (IUCN 3.1)

Scientific classification
- Kingdom: Animalia
- Phylum: Chordata
- Class: Actinopterygii
- Order: Blenniiformes
- Family: Chaenopsidae
- Genus: Acanthemblemaria
- Species: A. chaplini

Binomial name
- Acanthemblemaria chaplini J. E. Böhlke, 1957
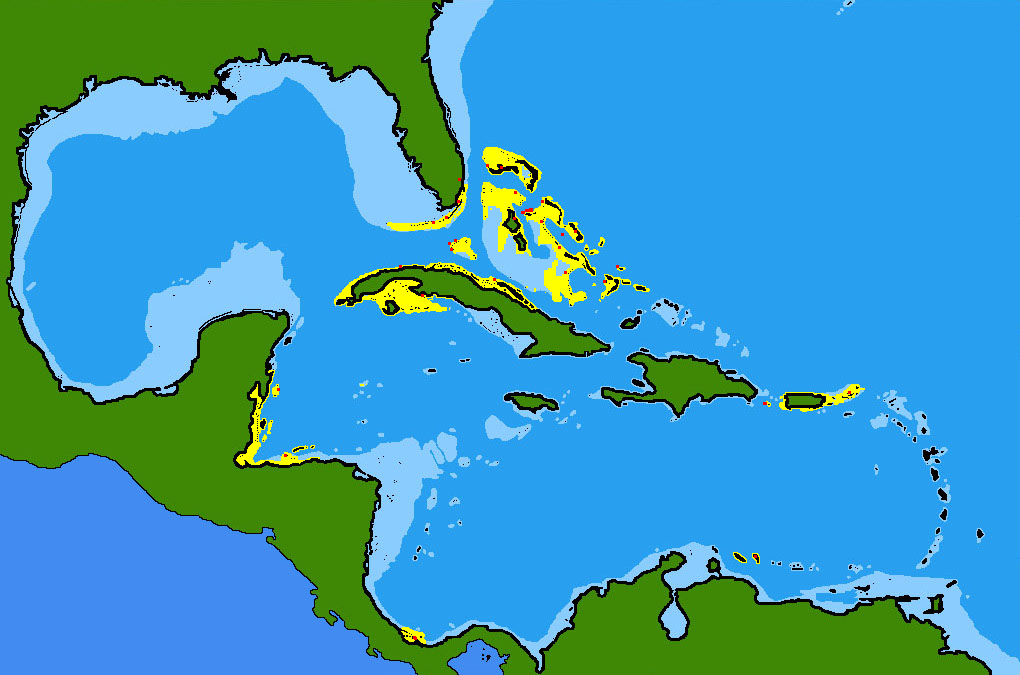

= Acanthemblemaria chaplini =

Species of fish

Acanthemblemaria chaplini, the papillose blenny, is a species of chaenopsid blenny found in the western Atlantic ocean. It can reach a maximum length of 4.5 centimetres (1.8 in) TL. The specific name honours the ichthyologist Charles C. G. Chaplin (1906-1991).
