= Revillagigedo =

Revillagigedo may refer to any of several subjects:

== People ==
- Juan Francisco de Güemes, 1st Count of Revillagigedo, viceroy of New Spain
- Juan Vicente de Güemes, 2nd Count of Revillagigedo, also a viceroy of New Spain

== Places ==
- Revillagigedo Channel in Alaska
- Revillagigedo Island in Alaska
- The Revillagigedo Islands, Pacific islands off the coast of the Mexican state of Colima

All three of these places were named after the 2nd count

- The 18th-century Revillagigedo Palace in Gijón, Asturias, Spain

== Creatures ==
- Acanthemblemaria mangognatha, also called the Revillagigedo barnacle blenny or the Revillagigedo barnacle: a seafish native to the Revillagigedo Islands
