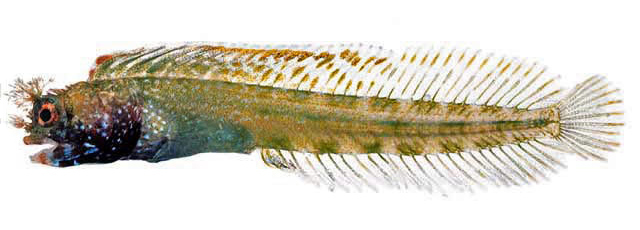

Conservation status
- Data Deficient (IUCN 3.1)

Scientific classification
- Kingdom: Animalia
- Phylum: Chordata
- Class: Actinopterygii
- Division: Teleostei
- Order: Blenniiformes
- Family: Chaenopsidae
- Genus: Acanthemblemaria
- Species: A. harpeza

Binomial name
- Acanthemblemaria harpeza J. T. Williams, 2002
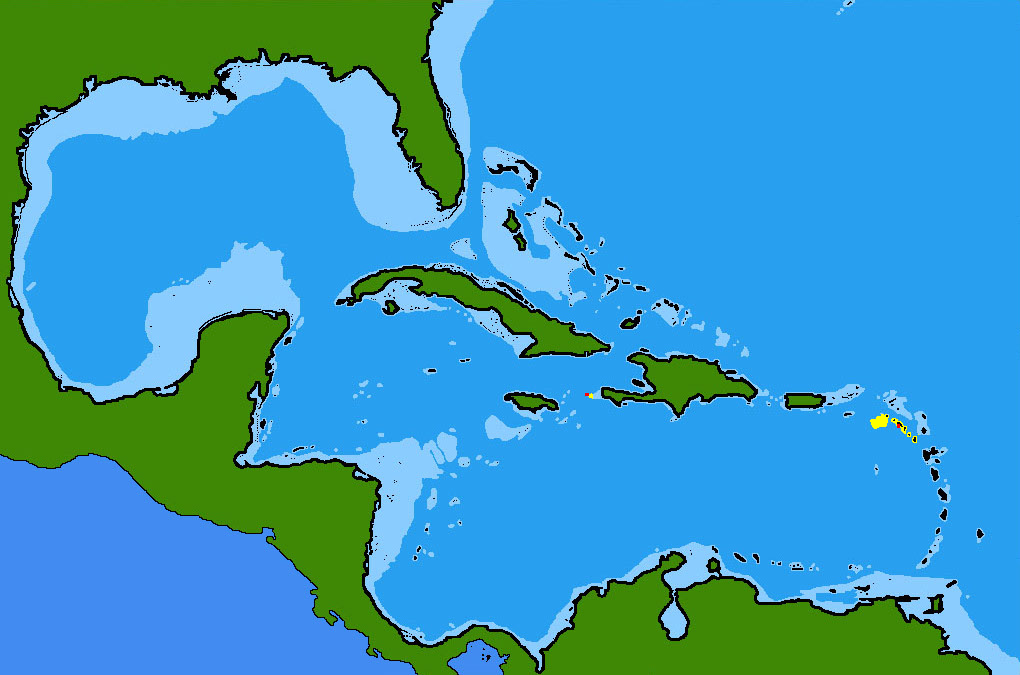

= Acanthemblemaria harpeza =

Species of fish

Acanthemblemaria harpeza is a species of chaenopsid blenny found around Navassa Island, in the western central Atlantic ocean.

== Etymology ==
The species name "harpeza" is Greek for "thorn hedge", referring to the thornbush-like nasal and orbital spines and cirri on the blennies' heads.
