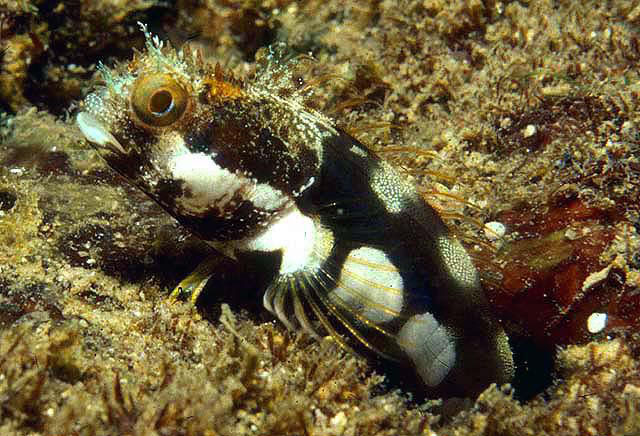

Conservation status
- Least Concern (IUCN 3.1)

Scientific classification
- Kingdom: Animalia
- Phylum: Chordata
- Class: Actinopterygii
- Division: Teleostei
- Order: Blenniiformes
- Family: Chaenopsidae
- Genus: Acanthemblemaria
- Species: A. maria

Binomial name
- Acanthemblemaria maria J. E. Böhlke, 1961
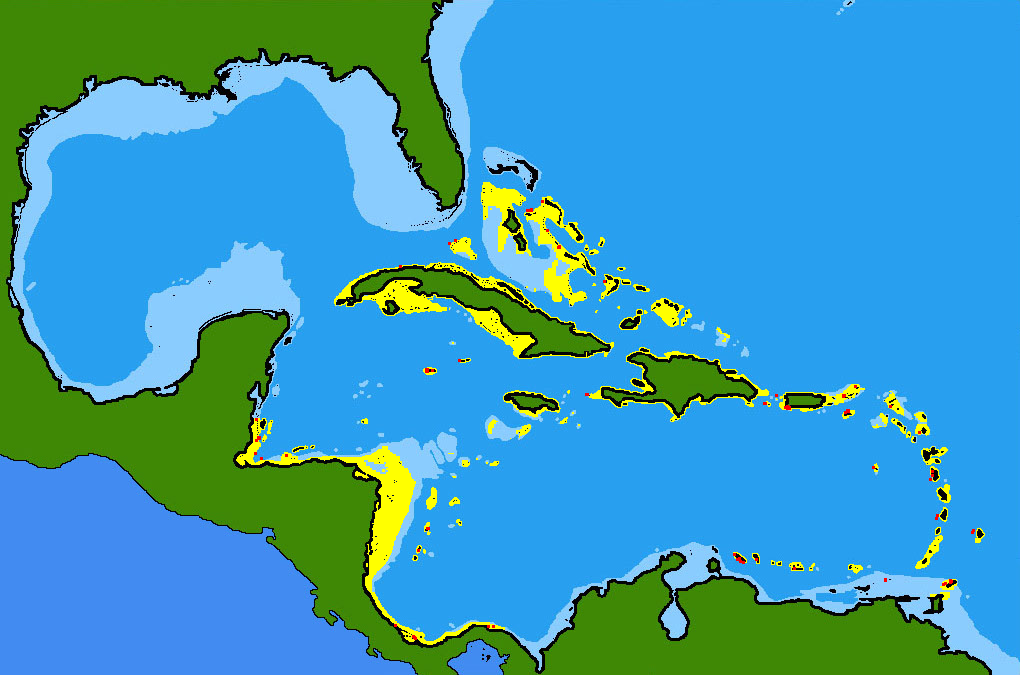

= Acanthemblemaria maria =

Species of fish

Acanthemblemaria maria, the secretary blenny, is a species of chaenopsid blenny found in shallow seas in the western central Atlantic Ocean and the Caribbean Sea. It can reach a maximum length of 5 cm (2.0 in) TL.

== Description ==
Acanthemblemaria maria is a slender, elongated fish with a maximum total length of 5 cm (2 in) but a more normal length is 3 cm (1.2 in). The long, continuous dorsal fin has 29 to 40 rays, the flexible spines usually being more numerous than the soft rays. This fish is very variable in colouring; it has whitish vertical stripes or patches on a usually brown background, and an irregular speckling of tiny spots. The large eyes are surrounded by yellowish-green orbital rings and the cheeks often bear a spot of blue or brown above a white band. Over the eyes are spines and tufts of branching, supraorbital cirri.

== Distribution and habitat ==
Acanthemblemaria maria occurs in the tropical western Atlantic Ocean. Its range includes the Bahamas, and in the Caribbean Sea it extends from Grand Cayman in Hispaniola to Trinidad and Tobago, as well as from Belize to Panama. It has been reported from Curaçao, but that is probably a case of mistaken identity. It is absent from the Gulf of Mexico and from the coasts of Florida and Brazil. Its depth range is down to about 20 m (66 ft) and it tends not to be found on patch reefs, preferring limestone slopes.

== Ecology ==
Acanthemblemaria maria lives in a burrow, a hollow in the rock, a crevice, a hole in a colonial coral, an empty mollusc shell or an empty serpulid worm tube. It is often associated with small brain corals, sea fans, sea whips and sea urchins. It is an ambush predator, remaining concealed in its lair with only its head projecting, until a copepod or other small invertebrate prey approaches. At this stage, it darts out, grabs the prey and retreats into its home. The eggs are laid in the lair and are tended by the male, the female taking no part in their care.

== Status ==
This is a common species with a wide distribution. No particular threats have been identified and there are no special conservation measures in place. The International Union for Conservation of Nature has assessed the fish's conservation status as being of "least concern".

== Etymology ==
The specific name is an eponym which honours James Erwin Böhlke's former secretary at the Academy of Natural Sciences of Philadelphia, Mary George, this is also acknowledged in the common name of secretary blenny.
