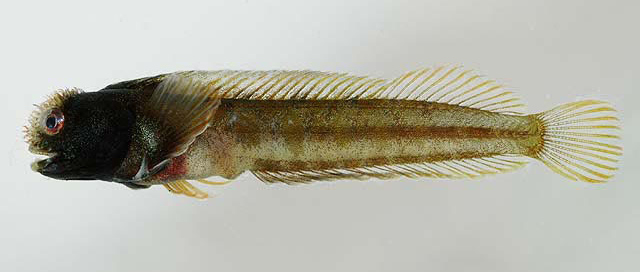

Conservation status
- Least Concern (IUCN 3.1)

Scientific classification
- Kingdom: Animalia
- Phylum: Chordata
- Class: Actinopterygii
- Order: Blenniiformes
- Family: Chaenopsidae
- Genus: Acanthemblemaria
- Species: A. johnsoni

Binomial name
- Acanthemblemaria johnsoni Almany & C. C. Baldwin, 1996
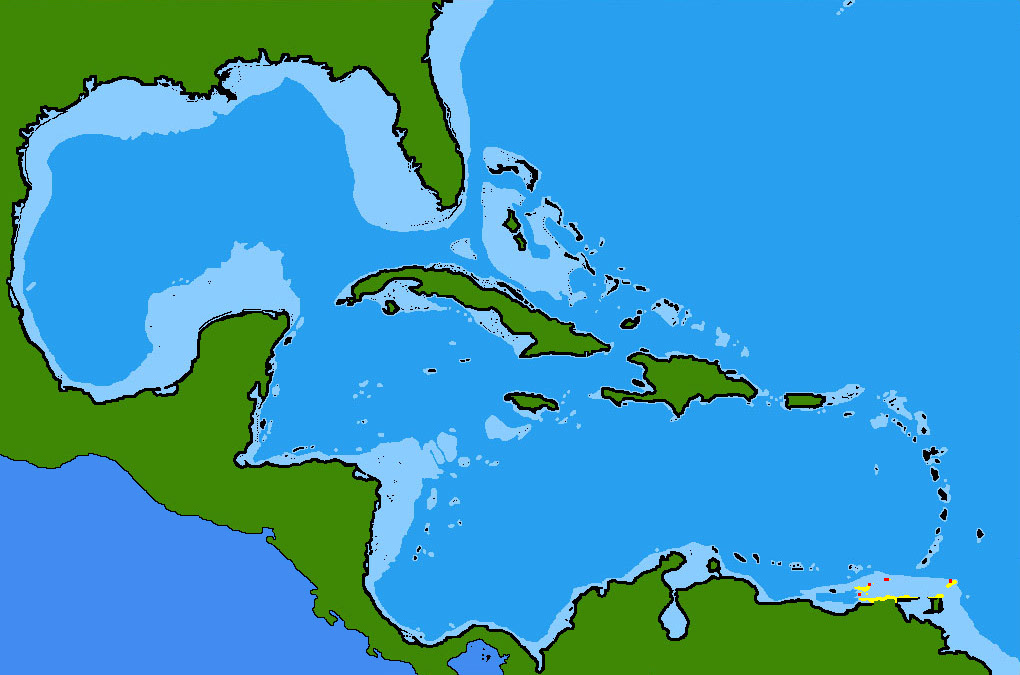

= Acanthemblemaria johnsoni =

Species of fish

Acanthemblemaria johnsoni, the white-cheeked blenny, is a species of chaenopsid blenny found in coral reefs around Tobago, in the western central Atlantic ocean. The specific name honours the ichthyologist G. David Johnson Curator of the Division of Fishes at the Smithsonian Institution.
