= Fathom (disambiguation) =

The fathom is an English unit of measurement. Fathom may also refer to:

== Film and television ==
- Fathom (1967 film), a spy comedy film directed by Leslie H. Martinson, starring Anthony Franciosa and Raquel Welch
- Fathom (2021 film), an American documentary film
- Fathom, a working title of the 2005–2006 science-fiction television series Surface
- Fathom Events, a distribution company that narrowcasts programming to cinemas via satellite

== Literature ==
- Fathom (comics), a comic-book series
- Fathom, a 2008 novel by Cherie Priest

== Other uses ==
- The wa or Thai fathom, now metricized
- Fathom (video game), 1983 video game by Imagic
- Fathom (album), 1993 album by Mortal
- Fathom Journal, published by Britain Israel Communications and Research Centre
- Fathom.com, a defunct online learning website developed by Columbia University
- Fathom (cruise line), a cruise line established by Carnival Corporation & plc in June 2015
- Fathom: Dynamic Data Software, educational math software by Key Curriculum Press
- Fathom Records, a division of Hearts of Space Records
- Ford Fathom, an electric compact pickup truck
