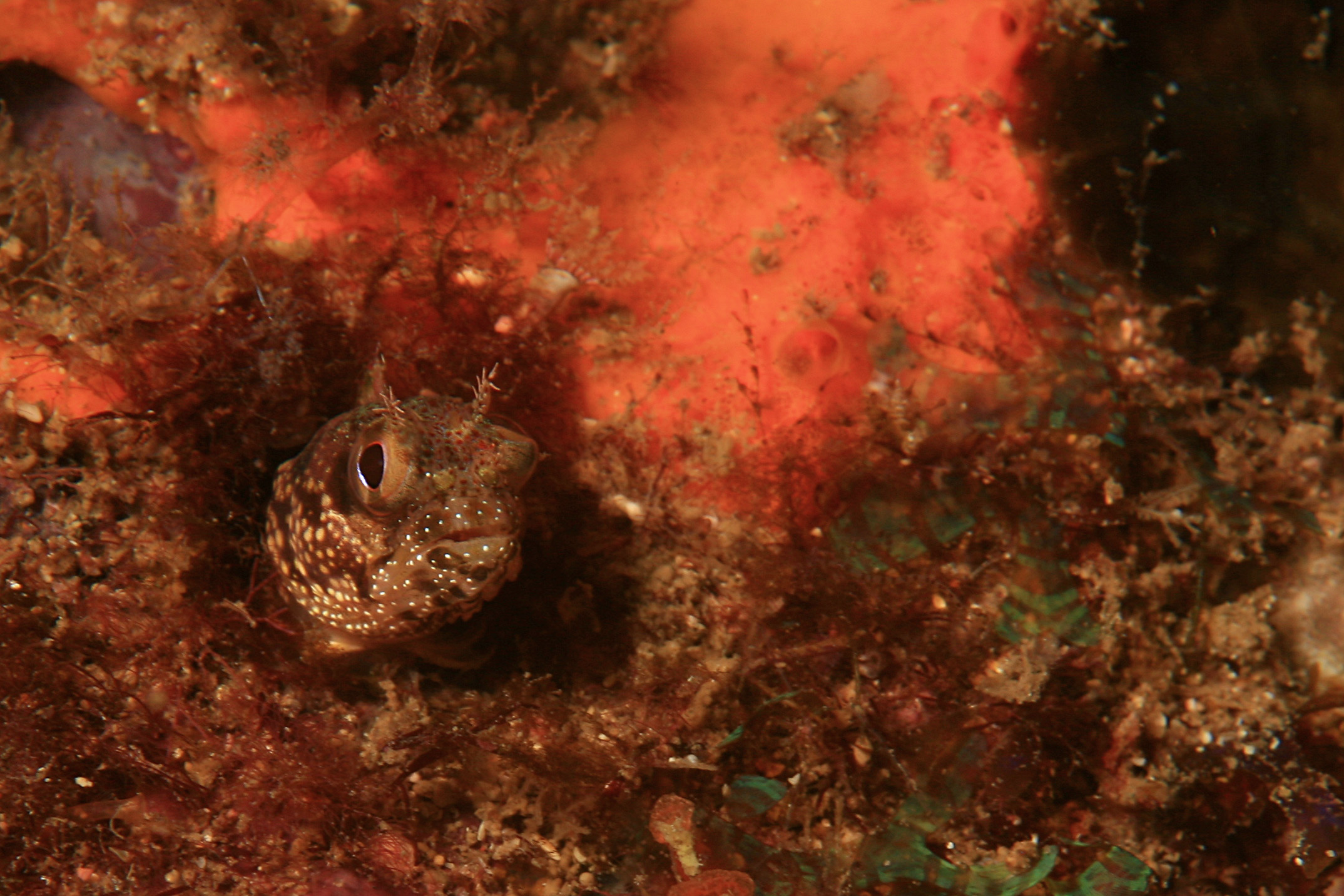

Conservation status
- Least Concern (IUCN 3.1)

Scientific classification
- Kingdom: Animalia
- Phylum: Chordata
- Class: Actinopterygii
- Order: Blenniiformes
- Family: Chaenopsidae
- Genus: Acanthemblemaria
- Species: A. exilispinus

Binomial name
- Acanthemblemaria exilispinus J. S. Stephens, 1963
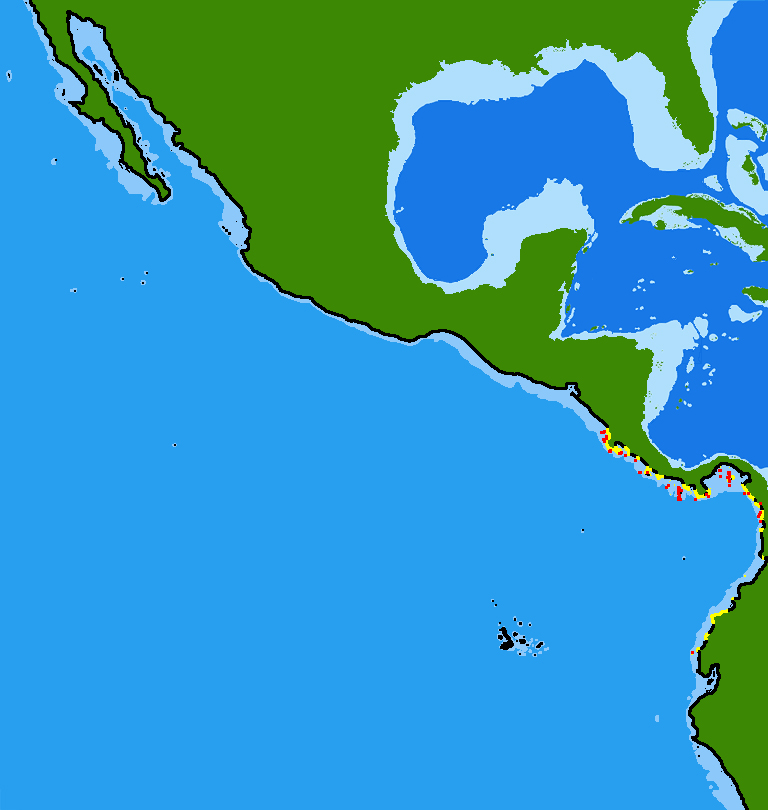

= Acanthemblemaria exilispinus =

Species of fish

Acanthemblemaria exilispinus, the bluntspine blenny, is a species of chaenopsid blenny found in coral reefs from Costa Rica to Ecuador, in the eastern central Pacific ocean. It can reach a maximum length of 5.5 centimetres (2.2 in) TL. This species feeds primarily on zooplankton.
