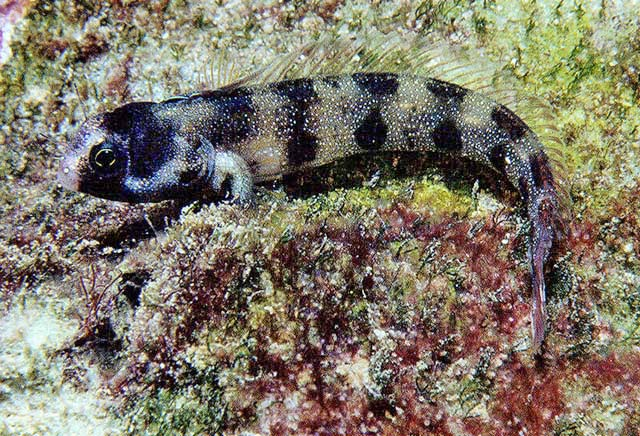

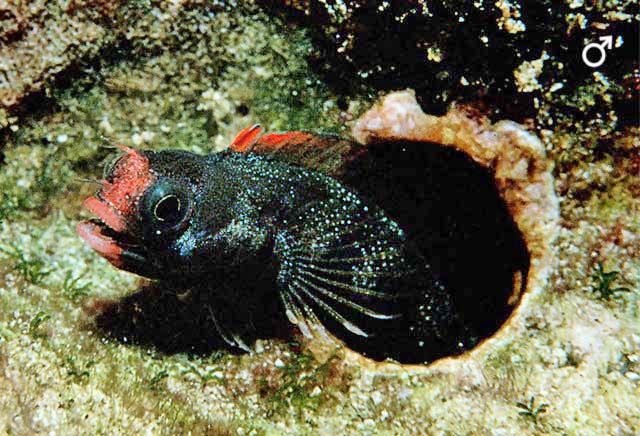

Conservation status
- Vulnerable (IUCN 3.1)

Scientific classification
- Kingdom: Animalia
- Phylum: Chordata
- Class: Actinopterygii
- Order: Blenniiformes
- Family: Chaenopsidae
- Genus: Acanthemblemaria
- Species: A. atrata

Binomial name
- Acanthemblemaria atrata Hastings & D. R. Robertson, 1999
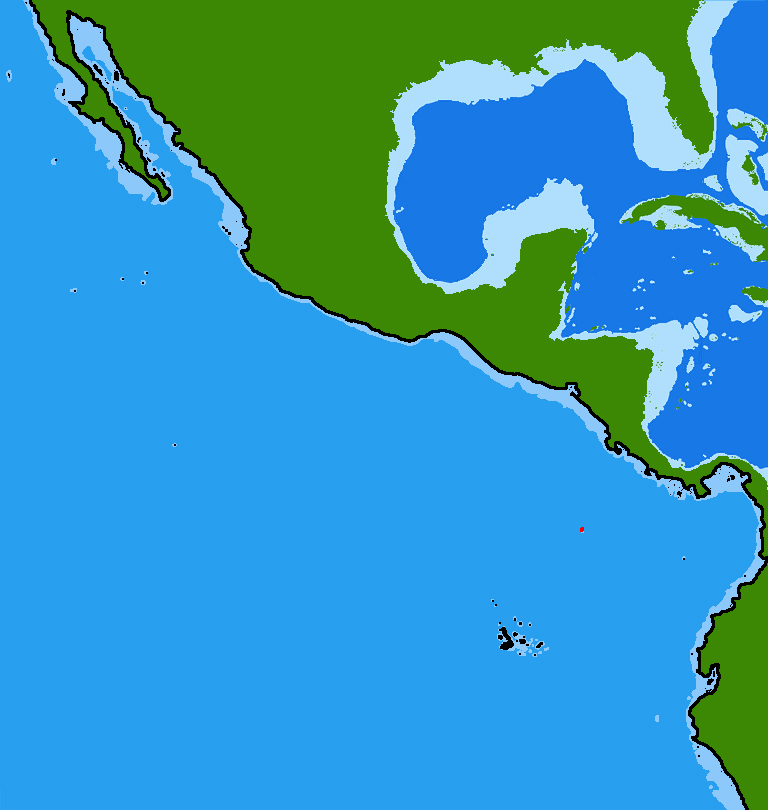

= Acanthemblemaria atrata =

Species of fish

Acanthemblemaria atrata, the Cocos barnacle blenny, is a species of chaenopsid blenny native to the Pacific Ocean waters around Cocos Island, Costa Rica. This species reaches a standard length of 3.2 cm (1.3 in).
