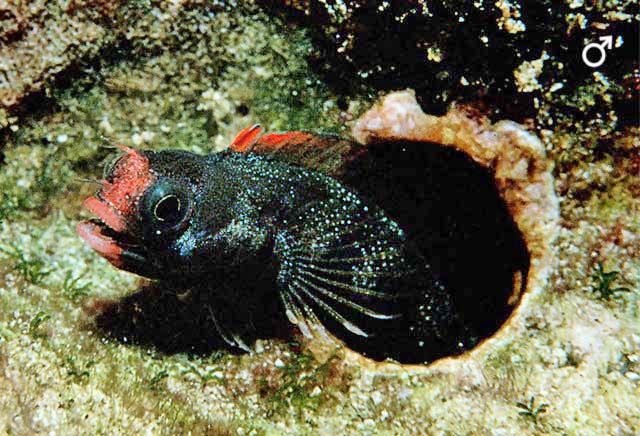
- Acanthemblemaria atrata

Scientific classification
- Kingdom: Animalia
- Phylum: Chordata
- Class: Actinopterygii
- Order: Blenniiformes
- Family: Chaenopsidae
- Genus: Acanthemblemaria; Metzelaar, 1919

Type species
- Acanthemblemaria spinosa Metzelaar, 1919
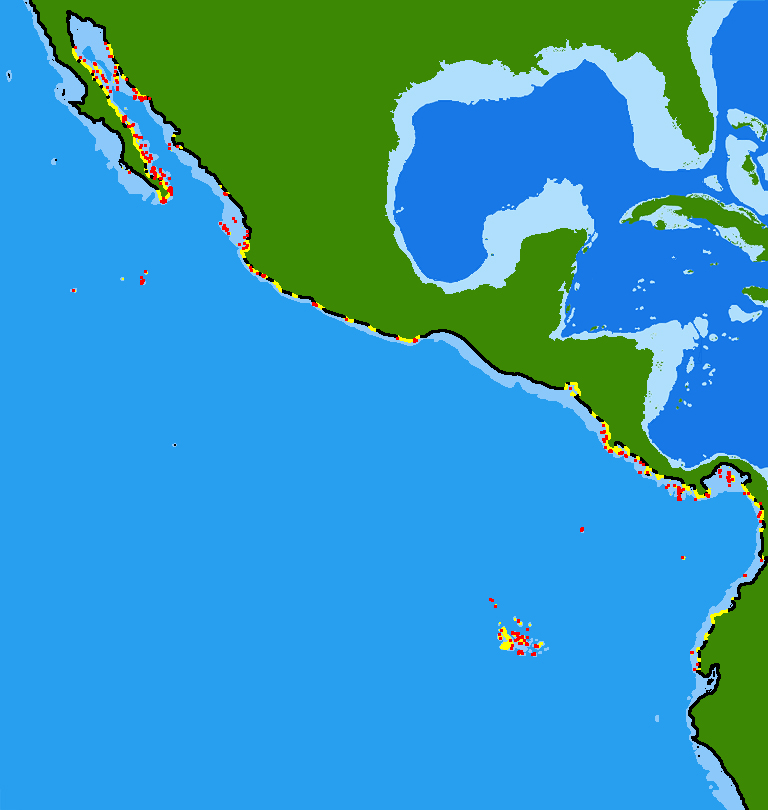

= Acanthemblemaria =

Genus of fishes

Acanthemblemaria is a genus of chaenopsid blennies native to the Atlantic and Pacific Oceans.

== Etymology ==
Acanthemblemaria: Greek, akantha = thorn + Greek, emblema, -atos, anything that is nailed, knocked in; also anything with bass [sic] or high relief.

== Description ==
Body elongated; head short and blunt; pointed or blunt spines on snout, below eye, sometimes on top of head; 2 rows of very well developed teeth on the roof of the mouth; 1 pair of branched or unbranched cirri over eyes; cirri over nostrils; usually with a notch between the spiny and soft parts of the dorsal fin.

== Species ==
The 22 recognized species in this genus are:

- Acanthemblemaria aceroi Hastings, Eytan & Summers, 2020 (Blue-spotted barnacle blenny)
- Acanthemblemaria aspera (Longley, 1927) (roughhead blenny)
- Acanthemblemaria atrata Hastings & D. R. Robertson, 1999 (Cocos barnacle blenny)
- Acanthemblemaria balanorum Brock, 1940 (clubhead blenny)
- Acanthemblemaria betinensis Smith-Vaniz & Palacio, 1974 (speckled blenny)
- Acanthemblemaria castroi J. S. Stephens & Hobson, 1966 (Galapagos barnacle blenny)
- Acanthemblemaria chaplini J. E. Böhlke, 1957 (papillose blenny)
- Acanthemblemaria crockeri Beebe & Tee-Van, 1938 (browncheek blenny)
- Acanthemblemaria exilispinus J. S. Stephens, 1963 (bluntspine blenny)
- Acanthemblemaria greenfieldi Smith-Vaniz & Palacio, 1974 (false papillose blenny)
- Acanthemblemaria hancocki G. S. Myers & Reid, 1936 (Hancock's blenny)
- Acanthemblemaria harpeza J. T. Williams, 2002
- Acanthemblemaria hastingsi H. C. Lin & Galland, 2010 (Cortez barnacle blenny)
- Acanthemblemaria johnsoni Almany & C. C. Baldwin, 1996
- Acanthemblemaria macrospilus Brock, 1940 (barnacle blenny)
- Acanthemblemaria mangognatha Hastings & D. R. Robertson, 1999 (Revillagigedo barnacle blenny)
- Acanthemblemaria maria J. E. Böhlke] 1961 (secretary blenny)
- Acanthemblemaria medusa Smith-Vaniz & Palacio, 1974 (Medusa blenny)
- Acanthemblemaria paula G. D. Johnson & Brothers, 1989 (dwarf spinyhead blenny)
- Acanthemblemaria rivasi J. S. Stephens, 1970 (spotjaw blenny)
- Acanthemblemaria spinosa Metzelaar, 1919 (spinyhead blenny)
- Acanthemblemaria stephensi Rosenblatt & McCosker, 1988 (Malpelo barnacle blenny)

== Behavior and diet ==
Acanthemblemaria species are mostly filter feeding fishes, they inhabit coral reefs, rocky reefs and abandoned worm and mollusc tubes.

They feed mostly on passing benthic crustaceans, zooplankton and benthic worms.
