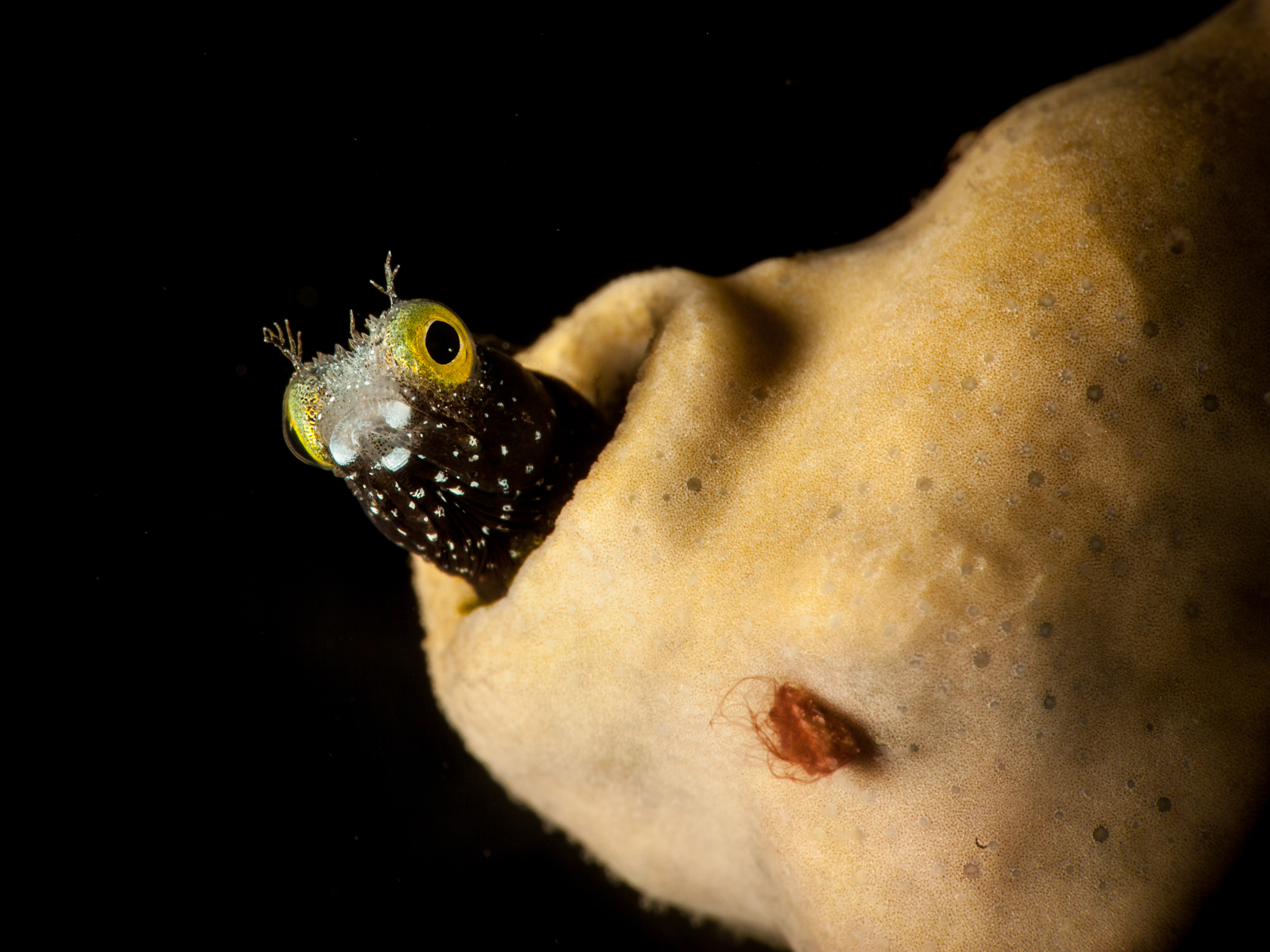

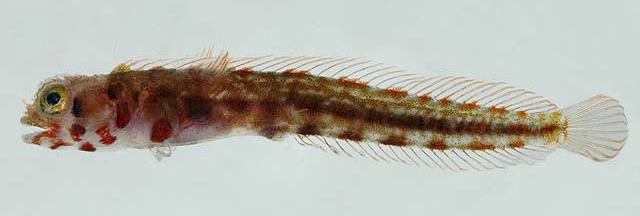

Conservation status
- Least Concern (IUCN 3.1)

Scientific classification
- Kingdom: Animalia
- Phylum: Chordata
- Class: Actinopterygii
- Division: Teleostei
- Order: Blenniiformes
- Family: Chaenopsidae
- Genus: Acanthemblemaria
- Species: A. spinosa

Binomial name
- Acanthemblemaria spinosa Metzelaar, 1919
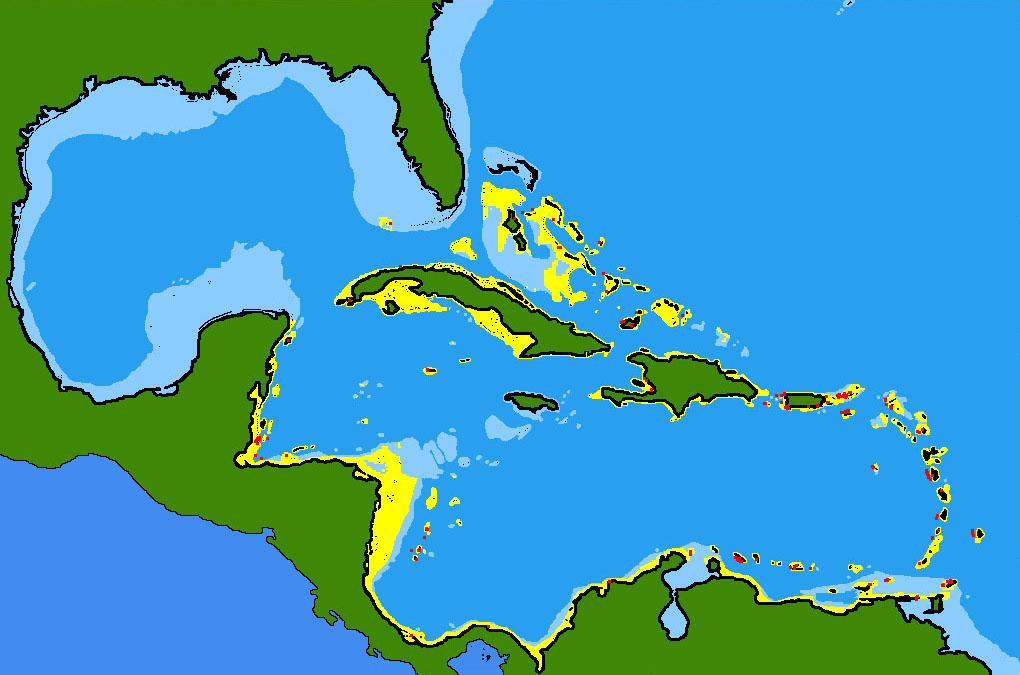

= Acanthemblemaria spinosa =

Spinyhead blenny

Species of fish

Acanthemblemaria spinosa, the spinyhead blenny, is a species of blenny native to the tropical western Atlantic Ocean and Caribbean Sea.

== Description ==
The spinyhead blenny has a mottled black, white and red coloration over the entire body, which is rather elongated. As with most blennies, the head of this animal has small, hair-like appendages over the eyes, which are large and red. The dorsal fin has 20 to 22 spines and 13 to 16 soft rays. The anal fin has two spines and 21 to 25 soft rays. It grows to a total length of 2.8 cm (1.1 in).

== Distribution and habitat ==
The spinyhead blenny is native to the tropical western central Atlantic Ocean and the Caribbean Sea. Its range extends from the Antilles, the Bahamas, and Florida to Curaçao. It typically inhabits small, rocky reefs surrounded by sand, and is known as a tube blenny from its habit of occupying a hole in a coral or an empty worm tube from which it pokes out its head. Its depth range is down to about 20 m (66 ft).

== Behavior ==
The spinyhead blenny is most often found on elkhorn coral (Acropora palmata) and inhabits the empty tubes of vermetid mollusks and serpulid worms. Competition for suitable holes is high and any vacated hole is soon occupied by another blenny from the area. Each blenny remains in its hole, but may be replaced by a larger fish after combat. Blennies displaced by 5 m (16 ft) are able to find their way back to their original hole, so they likely do sometimes leave their holes to explore their territories. They are opportunistic feeders, preferring to dart out quickly and retrieve food bits from the water column, as opposed to engaging in active foraging and hunting behavior. Their diet mainly consists of small crustaceans and planktonic particles.

In the home aquarium, they are entertaining and only require a moderate degree of care. They are reef safe.
