= List of poems by Samuel Menashe =

The goal of this article is to list all poems by Samuel Menashe, with chronology information.

== List of poems ==
The Volume column gives the collection where the poem was first included. For now, only The Many Named Beloved (MNB), No Jerusalem But This (NJBT), Fringe of Fire (FF), The Niche Narrows (NN) and New and Selected Poems (NSP) were consulted. The year of first publication is given in First published and the review in Venue.

Poems
Title	Volume	First published	Venue	Notes and links
A Bronze Head	NN			
A flock of little boats	MNB			
A pot poured out	NJBT			
Achilles	NSP			
Adam Means Earth	NN			
Alone he lay drunk	MNB			
All my friends are homeless	MNB			
All my life when I woke up at night...		1950	unpublished	
All things that heal	MNB			
Always (when I was a boy)	MNB	1960		
An amiable air alight	MNB			
Anonymous	NN	1996	The New Yorker	Download
Another Song of Sixpence	MNB			
Any demon seems smart	MNB			
Apotheosis	NSP	2005	Poetry	Download
April	MNB			
April (Fool)	NN			
Around my neck	MNB			
As Leah who was little loved	MNB			
As the tall, turbaned	MNB			
At a Standstill	NN			
At Cross Purposes	NN			
At every instant I expect	MNB			
At Millay's Grave	NN			
Autobiography	NSP			
Autumn	NJBT			
Awakening	NN			
Awakening from Dreams	NJBT	1965	Encounter	
Beachhead	NSP			
Bearings	NSP			
Between Bare Boughs	MNB			
Biographer	NSP	2008	Poetry	Download
Captain, Captive	NSP	2005	Poetry	Download
Cargo	MNB			
Carnival	MNB			
Chant at Dawn	MNB			
Commemoration	NSP			
Curriculum Vitae	NN			
Daily Bread	FF			
Descent	NJBT	2005	Poetry	Download
Diner	NSP			
Dominion	NN			
Downpour	NN			
Dreaming	NJBT	1970	The Iowa Review	Download
Dreams	NJBT			
Due Soldi di Speranza	NSP	2005	The New Criterion	Download
Dusk	MNB			
Eaves at dusk	NJBT			
Enclosure	NJBT			
Enigma	MNB			
Enlightenment	NN			
Ensconced	NSP			
Envoy	MNB			
Epitaph	NJBT			
Eyes	NN	2000	Metre	Download
Fall	NSP			
Family Plot	NN			
Family Silver	NN			
Fastness	NJBT			
Feedback	NJBT			
Fire Dance	MNB			
Forever and a Day	NN			
Full Fathom Five	NN			
Ghost at the Wake	NSP			
God's Grotesques	MNB			
Gray Boulder	FF			
Great Babylon	MNB			
Grief	NN			
Hallelujah	NN			
Heat Wave ("I catnap, wake")	NSP			
Heat Wave ("Sheets entangle him")	NSP	2004	Poetry	Download
Here	NSP	2004	Poetry	Download
Here Now		2009	Poetry	Download
Home Movie	NN	1995	The New Yorker	Download
I am chasing the Princess	MNB			
I Am the Hive	NSP			
I left my seed in a grove so deep	MNB			
I lie in snows	FF			
Ice	MNB			
Idol	MNB			
If I were as lean as I feel	NJBT			
Image	NJBT	1964	Encounter	
Image from Childhood	MNB			
Improvidence	NN			
In Memoriam	NSP			
In Memory of One without Wealth	MNB			
In My Digs	NN			
In Stride	NJBT			
In the catacomb of my mind	MNB			
In the Ring	NSP			
In the world	MNB			
In Your Face		2009	Poetry	Download
Infant, Old Man	NN			
Infanta	NSP			
Inklings	NN	1999	The New Yorker	Download
Insight	MNB			
January to July	NSP			
John the Baptist	MNB			
Judgment Day	NJBT			
Just now	FF			
Lament	FF	1964	Encounter	
Landmark	NN			
Landscape	MNB			
Le Lac Secret	MNB			
Leah Bribed Jacob	NSP			
Leavetaking	NSP			
Life Is Immense	NSP			
Lifted Up	NJBT			
Lust Puffs Up	MNB			
"Make It New"	NSP			
Manna	FF			
May	NJBT			
Memento Mori	NN			
Mirror Image	NSP			
Moon Night	MNB			
My Angels Are Dark	MNB			
My fingers run after air	MNB			
My Mother's Grave	NJBT			
Night Music	NN			
Night Walk	NN			
Night Watch	NN			
Nightfall, Morning	NN			
Norway	NSP			
November	MNB			
Now	NSP			
O Many Named Beloved	MNB			
Oh Lady lonely as a stone	MNB			
Off the Wall	NN			
Old as the Hills	NN			
Old Mirror	MNB			
On my Birthday	NJBT			
On the leafless winter vine	MNB			
On the Level	NN			
Paean ("Seated upon the open sea")	MNB			
Paean ("That ogre who devours me")	MNB			
Pagan Poem	NSP			
Pan's Work Is Done	MNB			
Paradise - After Giovanni di Paolo	MNB			
Parchment of dead leaves	MNB			
Paschal Wilderness	NJBT			
Passage	MNB			
Passive Resistance	NSP	2000	Metre	Download
Pastoral	MNB			
Peace	NSP			
Peaceful Purposes	NJBT	1969	New York Review of Books	Download
Petals	NSP			
Pirate	NJBT			
Pirate's Port and Voyage	MNB			
Pity us	MNB			
Praise all that deprives us	MNB			
Promised Land	MNB			
Psalm		2009	Poetry	Download
R and R	NSP			
Railroad Flat	NSP			
Red Glints in Black Hair	NJBT			
Reeds rise from water	NJBT			
Rest In Peace	NSP			
Roads run forever	MNB			
Rue	NSP	2004	Poetry	Download
Ruins	NSP			
Rural Sunrise	NJBT			
Salt and Pepper	NN			
Salt on a sparrow's tail	MNB			
Scissors	NN			
Scribe, Condemned	NSP			
Self Employed	NJBT			
Shade	NJBT			
She who saw he moon last night	MNB			
Sheen	NJBT	1965	The New Yorker	Download
Sheep Meadow	NJBT			
Simon Says	NN			
Sketches: By the Sea	NN			
Skull	NSP			
Sleep	NJBT			
Small Kingdom	MNB			
Small Stones	MNB			
Sore Loser		2000	Metre	Download
So they stood	FF			
Solitude	NN			
Someone Walked Over My Grave	MNB	1956	Yale Review	
Sparrow	NSP			
Spring Snow	NSP			
Spur of the Moment	NN			
Star-crossed	NN			
Still Life	NSP			
Stone would be water	MNB			
Story Teller	NSP			
Sudden Shadow	MNB			
Sunset, Central Park	NJBT			
Survival	NN			
Take any man	MNB			
Telescoped	NN			
Tempus Fugit		2009	Poetry	Download
Tenement Spring	MNB			
The Abandoned One	MNB			
The Annunciation	NN			
The Apple of My Eye	NJBT			
The Bare Tree	NJBT			
The Dead of Winter	NN			
The friends of my father	NJBT			
The Golden	MNB			
The high dome of Sancta Sofia	MNB			
The Hill I See	NSP			
The Hollow of Morning	MNB			
The Host	NN			
The Living End	NN	1998	The New Yorker	Download
The Moment of Your Death	NJBT	1970	The Iowa Review	Download
The Niche	NJBT			
The Offering	NSP			
The Oracle	NN			
The Reservoir	NSP			
The Room of My Friend	MNB			
The Sanderling	NJBT			
The Sandpiper	NN			
The Scrutiny	NN			
The Sea Staves	FF			
The Shot	MNB			
The Social Life		1995	The New Yorker	Download
The Stars Are	NSP	2004	Poetry	Download
The Water	NJBT			
The yield of my peaceful yawning	MNB			
There is No Jerusalem but This	MNB			
These Stone Steps	NJBT	1970	The Iowa Review	Download
The Shrine Whose Shape I Am	NJBT			
The Spright of Delight	NN			
The Visitation	NN	2000	Metre	Download
This sky is like a bowl	MNB			
To Open	NJBT			
Transfusion	NSP			
Transplant	NN			
Triptych	NSP			
Twilight	NN			
Uniform	NJBT			
Using the window ledge	NJBT			
Visionary Conversation	MNB			
Voyage	MNB			
Walking Under	FF			
Walking Stick	NN	1999	Tundra	Download
Warrior Wisdom	MNB			
Waterfall	NN			
Western Wind	NN			
What to Expect	NN	1995	The New Yorker	Download
When I die	MNB			
When I was a young man	MNB			
White Hair Does Not Weigh	NJBT			
Who		2010	Poetry	Download
Whose Name I Know	NSP			
Wind	NJBT			
Windows: Old Window	NSP			
Winter	NJBT	1970	The New Yorker	Download
Winter	NJBT	1970	The New Yorker	Download
