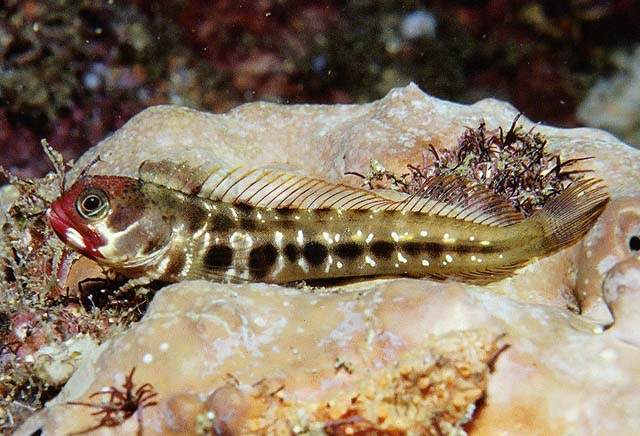

Conservation status
- Least Concern (IUCN 3.1)

Scientific classification
- Kingdom: Animalia
- Phylum: Chordata
- Class: Actinopterygii
- Division: Teleostei
- Order: Blenniiformes
- Family: Chaenopsidae
- Genus: Acanthemblemaria
- Species: A. balanorum

Binomial name
- Acanthemblemaria balanorum Brock, 1940
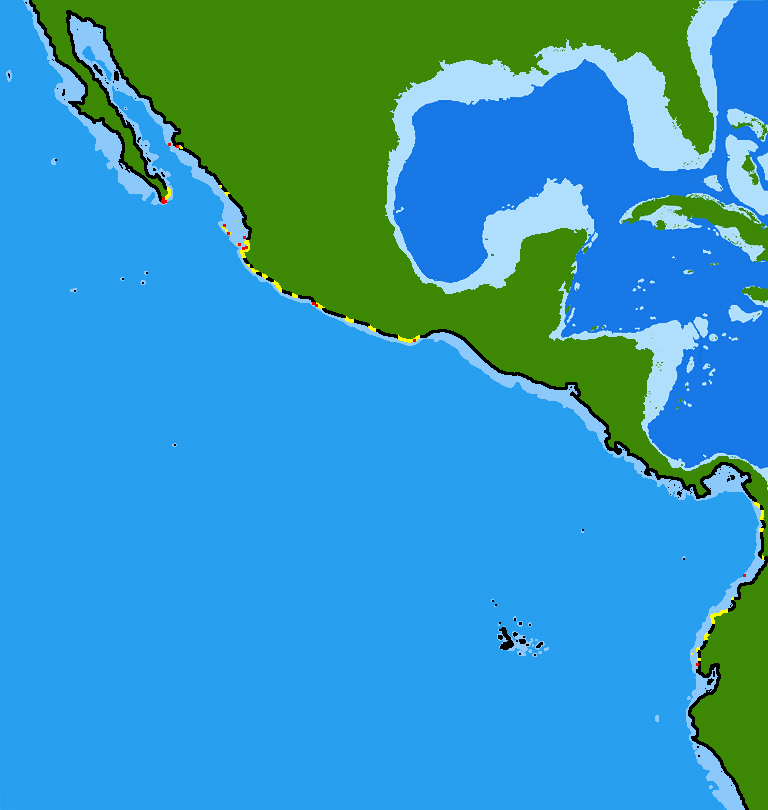

= Acanthemblemaria balanorum =

Species of fish

Acanthemblemaria balanorum, the clubhead blenny or clubhead barnacle blenny, is native to the eastern Pacific Ocean, where it occurs from the Gulf of California along the coast of Mexico south to Colombia and Ecuador.

This fish lives in rocky reef habitat in tropical marine waters no deeper than 5 m. It inhabits empty barnacle shells, in particular those of Megabalanus tintinnabulum. The female lays eggs inside the shell and the male guards them. This fish feeds primarily on zooplankton.
