= Three Shakespeare Songs =

1951 classical choral music by Ralph Vaughan Williams

- by Ralph Vaughan Williams, setting of text by William Shakespeare
- The vocal score of Three Shakespeare Songs
- Other name: Full Fathom Five; The Cloud-Capp'd Towers; Over Hill, Over Dale
- Period: 20th-century classical music
- Genre: Classical Part song
- Language: Early Modern English
- Composed: June 1951
- Publisher: Oxford University Press
- Duration: 7 minutes approx
- Vocal: SATB a cappella choir

Premiere
- Date: 23 June 1951
- Location: Royal Festival Hall, London, UK
- Conductor: Cecil Armstrong Gibbs

Three Shakespeare Songs is a piece of classical choral music written for an a cappella SATB choir. It was written in 1951 by the British classical composer Ralph Vaughan Williams. The work comprises three short pieces which are settings of text from two plays by the English playwright William Shakespeare. It is published by Oxford University Press.

== Composition and first performance ==
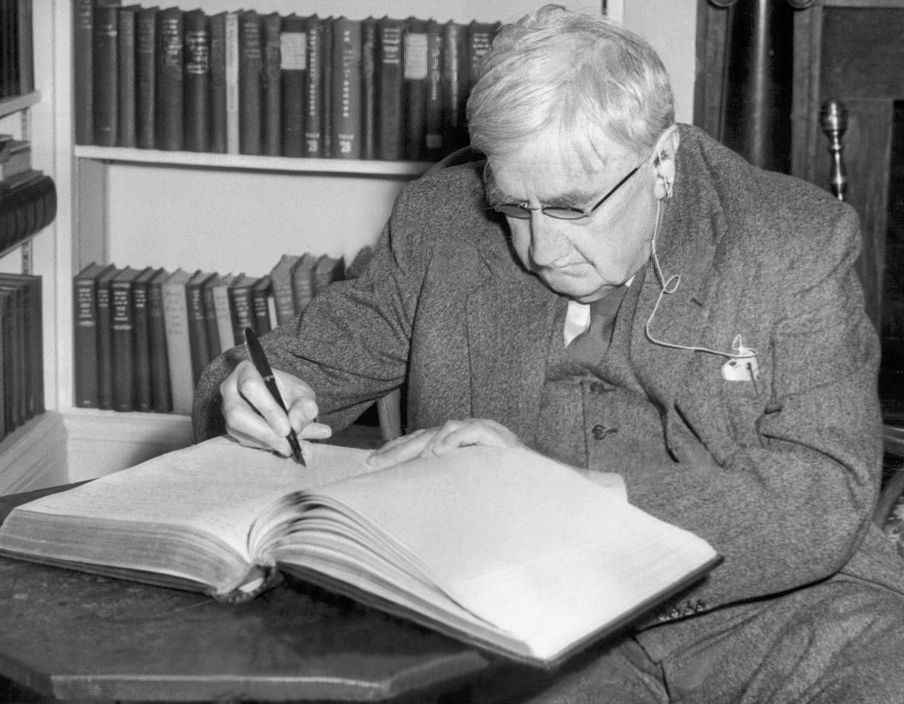
Composer Ralph Vaughan Williams

In 1951 the British Federation of Music Festivals (of which Vaughan Williams was president) held its annual National Competitive Festival during the Festival of Britain. The festival included a choral competition in which choirs from around the United Kingdom would demonstrate their technical abilities by performing test pieces. Vaughan Williams's associate composer, Cecil Armstrong Gibbs, tried to persuade him to compose a new test piece. Vaughan Williams was reluctant at first, and was of the opinion that the choirs should perform established test pieces rather than introducing a new composition. Disappointed that Vaughan Williams had apparently failed to answer his letter, Armstrong Gibbs appeared to have given up on the idea:

Soon afterwards I was stricken down with some illness and was in bed when a fat envelope, registered and bearing the Dorking postmark, was brought up. Inside was the MS. (manuscript) of the Three Shakespeare Songs dedicated to me and the briefest of notes which ran: "Dear Armstrong. Here are three Shakespeare settings. Do what you like with them... Yours ever R.V.W."

— Cecil Armstrong Gibbs

The songs were premiered in the Royal Festival Hall on 23 June 1951, conducted by Armstrong Gibbs.

== Harmonic style ==
Stylistic comparisons have been made with Vaughan Williams's Sixth Symphony which was composed only four years earlier, notably of the second song, The Cloud-Capp'd Towers. Although the published version begins in the key of F♯ minor, the composer's original holograph was in E minor, which is also the key of the Sixth Symphony. The shifting between E minor and E♭ minor triads, as heard on the words "shall dissolve" has been compared to the conclusion of the Epilogue movement of the symphony. Vaughan Williams himself later suggested that the meaning of the symphony's last movement could be summed up in the lines from The Tempest: "We are such stuff / As dreams are made on; and our little life / Is rounded with a sleep."

== Texts ==
The text of each song is derived from plays by William Shakespeare:

=== Full Fathom Five ===
The first song is a setting of Ariel's Song to Ferdinand from The Tempest. It refers to Ferdinand's father — Alonso, King of Naples — who is presumed drowned in a shipwreck and whose body undergoes a magical transformation in the ocean depths. The spirit Ariel sings this song to a prince of Naples. Prince Ferdinand falsely thinks his father is drowned in the ocean.

The Tempest, Act 1 scene 2:

Full Fathom Five
18-second sample from Vaughan Williams's arrangement of Full Fathom Five.

Full fathom five thy father lies,
Of his bones are coral made;
Those are pearls that were his eyes:
Nothing of him that doth fade,
But doth suffer a sea-change
Into something rich and strange.
Sea-nymphs hourly ring his knell:
Ding-dong.
Hark! now I hear them, – ding-dong bell.

=== The Cloud-Capp'd Towers ===
The second song also uses lines from The Tempest, spoken by the sorcerer Prospero to conclude the masque at the wedding of his daughter Miranda to Prince Ferdinand. The characters, Prospero announces, will all fade away, and this play within a play itself becomes a metaphor for the transience of real life, the globe symbolising both the world and the Globe Theatre in London.

The Tempest, Act IV scene 1

The Cloud-Capp'd Towers
16-second sample from Vaughan Williams's arrangement of The Cloud-Capp'd Towers.

The cloud-capp'd towers, the gorgeous palaces,
The solemn temples, the great globe itself,
Yea, all which it inherit, shall dissolve,
And, like this insubstantial pageant faded,
Leave not a rack behind: We are such stuff
As dreams are made on, and our little life
Is rounded with a sleep.

=== Over Hill, Over Dale ===
Text from A Midsummer Night's Dream forms the basis of the third song, the Fairy's Song to Puck. The furiously rhythmic verse evokes the mythology of Titania, the Fairy Queen.

Over hill, over dale
6-second sample from Vaughan Williams's arrangement of Over hill, over dale.

A Midsummer Night's Dream, Act II scene 1

Over hill, over dale,
Thorough bush, thorough briar,
Over park, over pale,
Thorough flood, thorough fire
I do wander everywhere.
Swifter than the moonè's sphere;
And I serve the fairy queen,
To dew her orbs upon the green.
The cowslips tall her pensioners be;
In their gold coats spots you see;
Those be rubies, fairy favours,
In those freckles live their savours:
I must go seek some dew-drops here,
And hang a pearl in every cowslip's ear.
