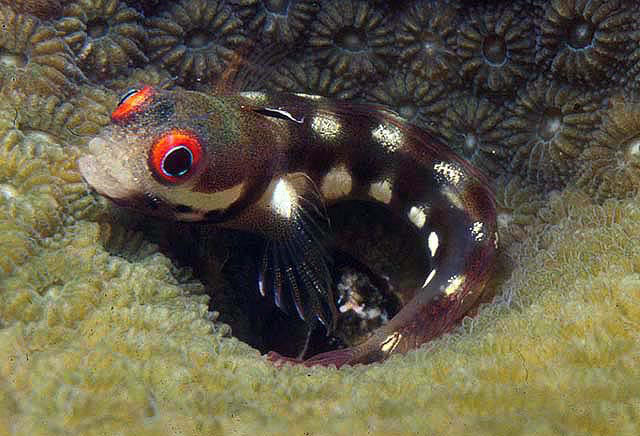

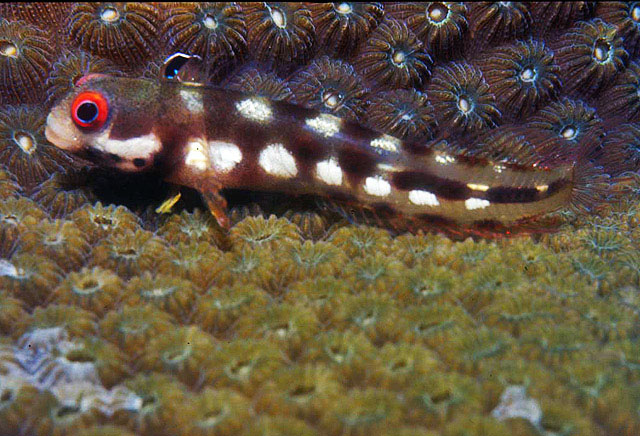

Conservation status
- Least Concern (IUCN 3.1)

Scientific classification
- Kingdom: Animalia
- Phylum: Chordata
- Class: Actinopterygii
- Order: Blenniiformes
- Family: Chaenopsidae
- Genus: Acanthemblemaria
- Species: A. rivasi

Binomial name
- Acanthemblemaria rivasi J. S. Stephens, 1970
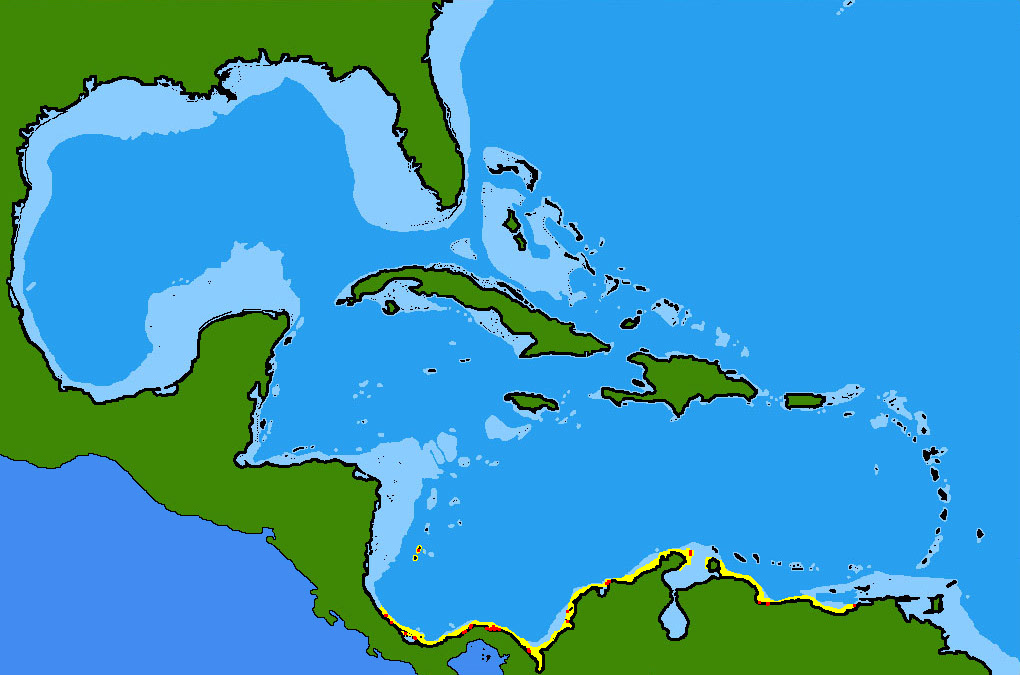

= Acanthemblemaria rivasi =

Species of fish

Acanthemblemaria rivasi, the spotjaw blenny, is a species of chaenopsid blenny found in coral reefs off Colombia and Costa Rica, in the western Atlantic Ocean. The specific name is an eponym but the individual it honours has not been identified, but it is possibly Luis R. Rivas of the University of Miami who is known to have lent specimens to Stephens.
