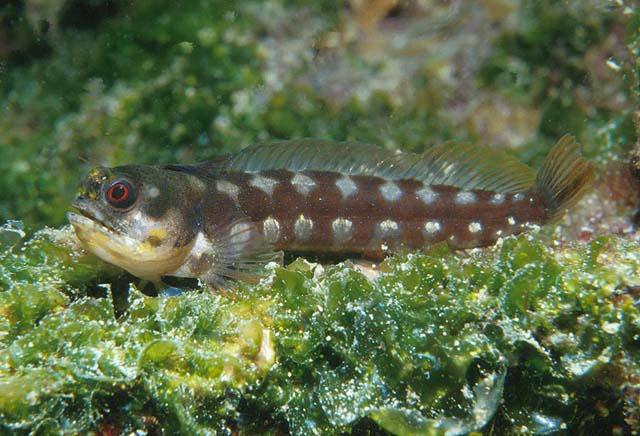

Conservation status
- Vulnerable (IUCN 3.1)

Scientific classification
- Kingdom: Animalia
- Phylum: Chordata
- Class: Actinopterygii
- Order: Blenniiformes
- Family: Chaenopsidae
- Genus: Acanthemblemaria
- Species: A. castroi

Binomial name
- Acanthemblemaria castroi J. S. Stephens & Hobson, 1966
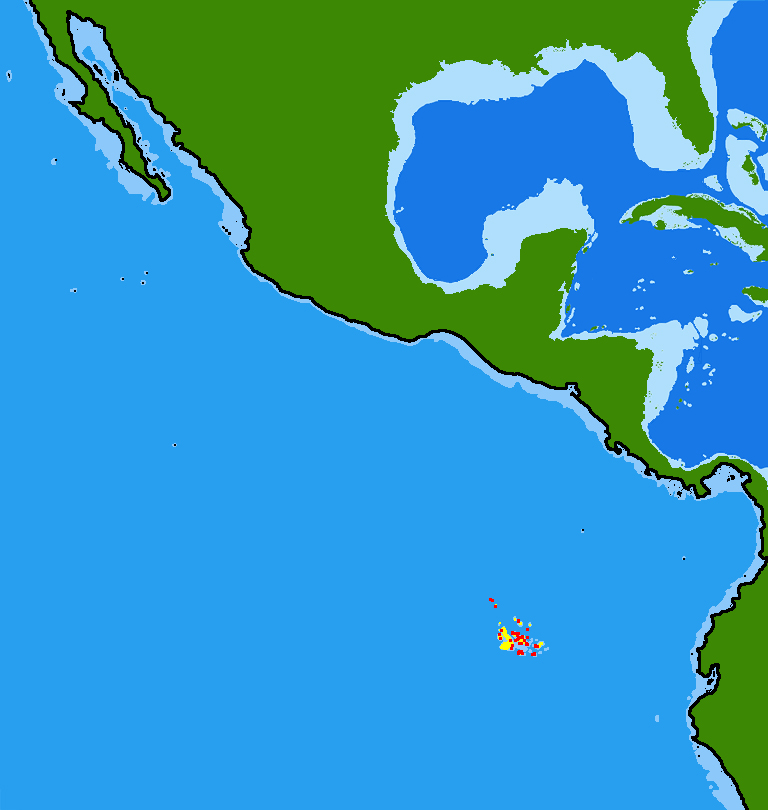

= Acanthemblemaria castroi =

Species of fish

Acanthemblemaria castroi, the Galapagos barnacle blenny, is a species of chaenopsid blenny endemic to coral reefs in the Galapagos Islands, in the southeast Pacific ocean. It can reach a maximum length of 6 cm (2.4 in) TL. The specific name honours a naturalist at the Charles Darwin Foundation, Academy Bay, Santa Cruz Island, Galápagos, Miguel Castro.
