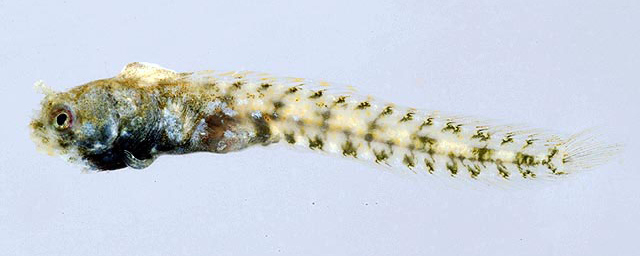

Conservation status
- Data Deficient (IUCN 3.1)

Scientific classification
- Kingdom: Animalia
- Phylum: Chordata
- Class: Actinopterygii
- Order: Blenniiformes
- Family: Chaenopsidae
- Genus: Acanthemblemaria
- Species: A. paula

Binomial name
- Acanthemblemaria paula G. D. Johnson & Brothers, 1989
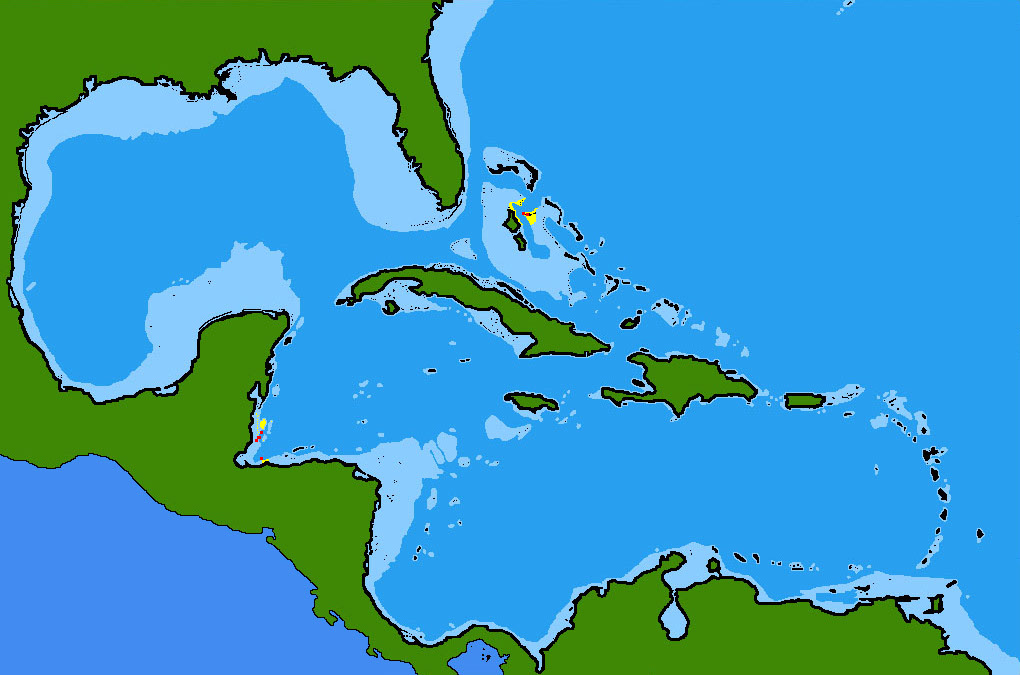

= Acanthemblemaria paula =

Species of fish

Acanthemblemaria paula, the dwarf spinyhead blenny, is a species of chaenopsid blenny found in coral reefs around Belize, in the western central Atlantic ocean. It can reach a maximum length of 1.8 cm (0.71 in) SL.
