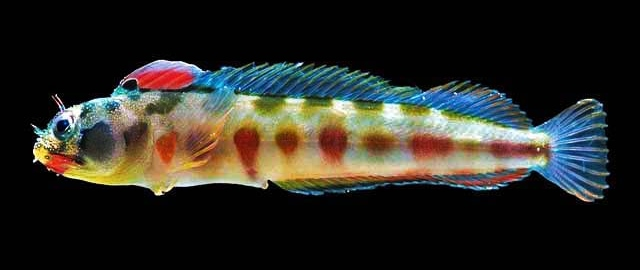

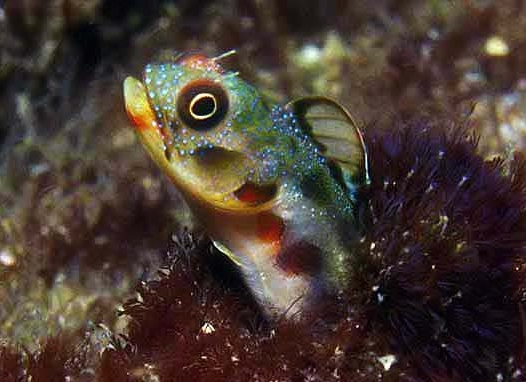

Conservation status
- Least Concern (IUCN 3.1)

Scientific classification
- Kingdom: Animalia
- Phylum: Chordata
- Class: Actinopterygii
- Order: Blenniiformes
- Family: Chaenopsidae
- Genus: Acanthemblemaria
- Species: A. macrospilus

Binomial name
- Acanthemblemaria macrospilus Brock, 1940
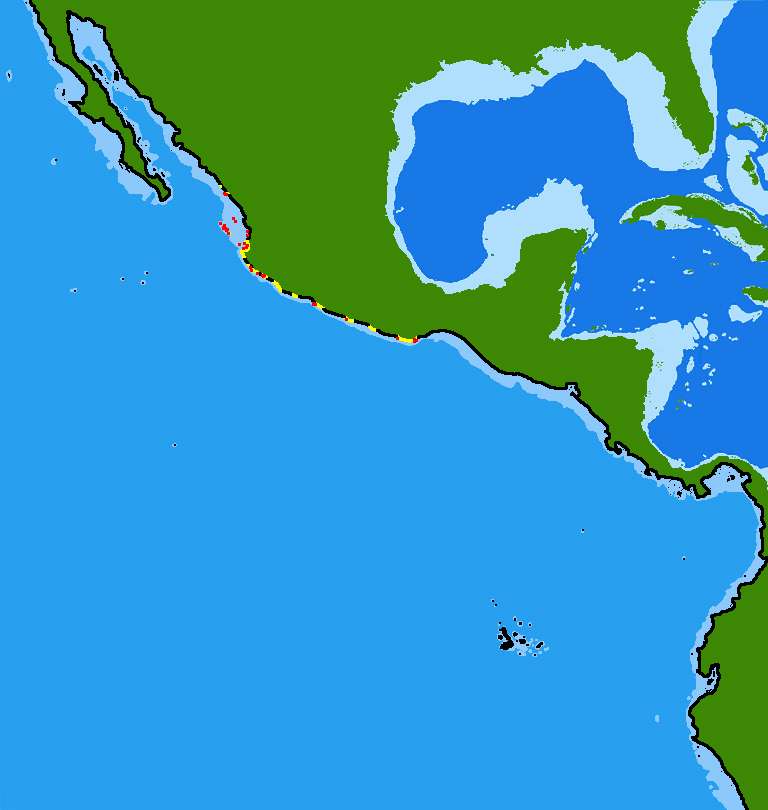

= Acanthemblemaria macrospilus =

Species of fish

Acanthemblemaria macrospilus, the barnacle blenny, is a species of chaenopsid blenny found in coral reefs in the eastern central Pacific ocean. It can reach a maximum length of 6 cm (2.4 in) TL. This species feeds primarily on zooplankton.
