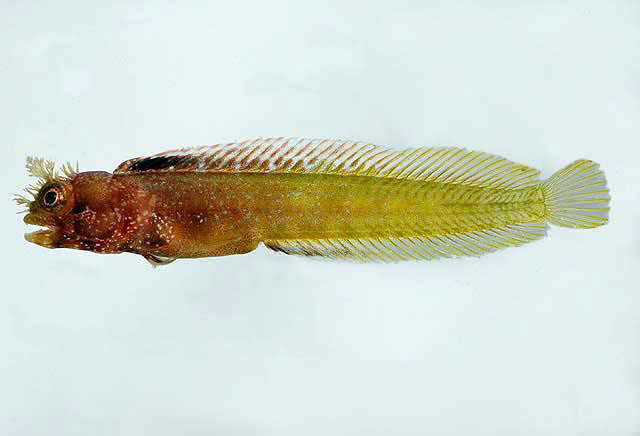

Conservation status
- Least Concern (IUCN 3.1)

Scientific classification
- Kingdom: Animalia
- Phylum: Chordata
- Class: Actinopterygii
- Order: Blenniiformes
- Family: Chaenopsidae
- Genus: Acanthemblemaria
- Species: A. medusa

Binomial name
- Acanthemblemaria medusa Smith-Vaniz & Palacio, 1974
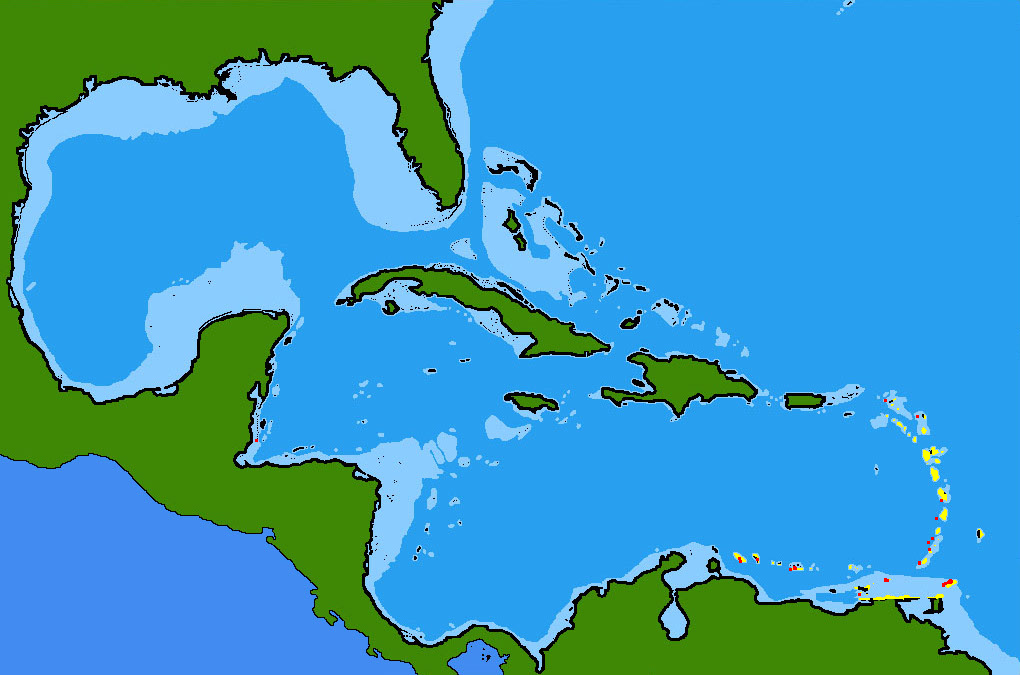

= Acanthemblemaria medusa =

Species of fish

Acanthemblemaria medusa, the medusa blenny, is a species of chaenopsid blenny found in coral reefs around Lesser Antilles, in the western central Atlantic ocean. It can reach a maximum length of 4 cm (1.6 in) TL.
