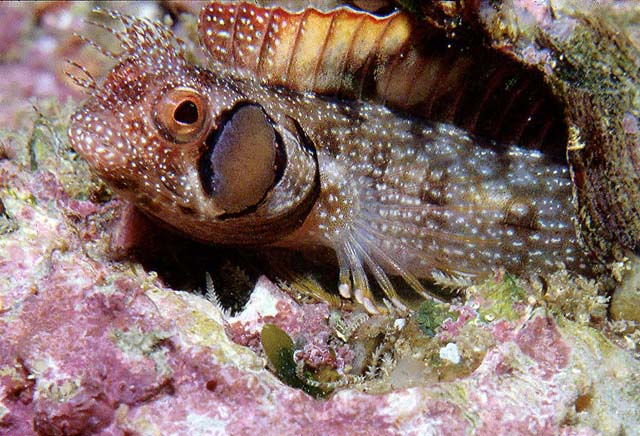

Conservation status
- Least Concern (IUCN 3.1)

Scientific classification
- Kingdom: Animalia
- Phylum: Chordata
- Class: Actinopterygii
- Division: Teleostei
- Order: Blenniiformes
- Family: Chaenopsidae
- Genus: Acanthemblemaria
- Species: A. crockeri

Binomial name
- Acanthemblemaria crockeri Beebe & Tee-Van, 1938
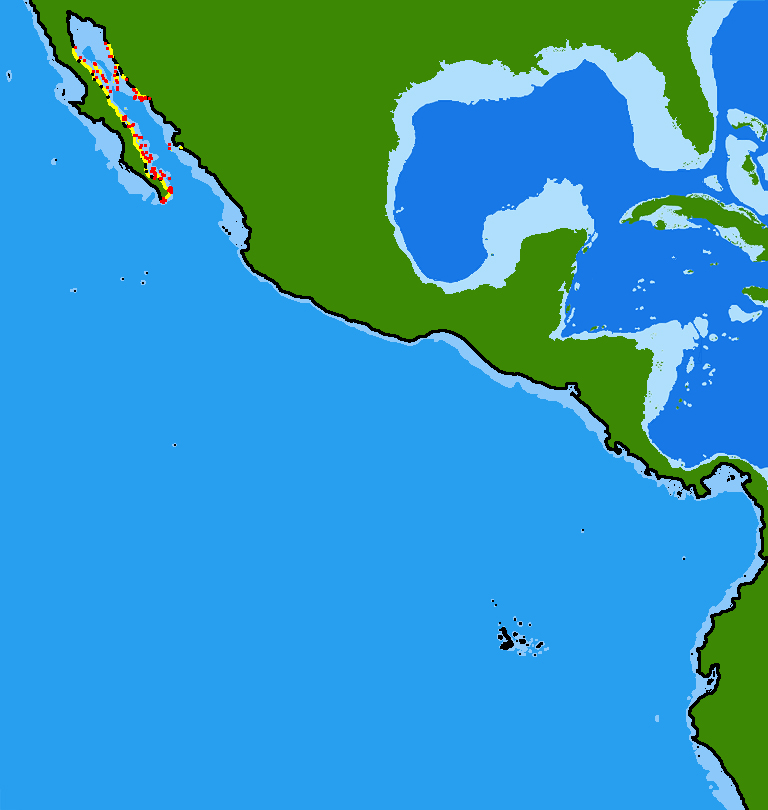

= Acanthemblemaria crockeri =

Species of fish

The browncheek blenny (Acanthemblemaria crockeri) is a species of chaenopsid blenny found in the Gulf of California; a semi-enclosed marginal sea of the eastern Pacific Ocean; they can also be known as tube blennies or Tubícola de cachetón. Globally, the Acanthemblemaria family has twenty species in the genus. This species is one of the Chaenopsids that live in Baja California; the others being the Cortez stinger blenny, Thorny-headed blenny, and Angel rockfish. They thrive in shallow coral reef habitats with small spaces and crevices where they can avoid predators and eat zooplankton and pelagic fish eggs. It can reach a maximum length of 6 cm (2.4 in), but is more commonly found less than 3 cm TL. The identity of the person honored in the specific name of this specie was not specified but it is thought to be the explorer and philanthropist Charles Templeton Crocker (1884–1948). This species was able to be identified as an individual species through examination of the crockeri specimen and description of the Acanthemblemaria hancocki, showing that there is a difference in the two species. The Browncheek Blenny can be confused with the Clubhead Barnacle Blenny, Acanthemblemaria balanorum. This species lacks white spots on the head and sides; gill cover brown ring is much smaller).

== Description ==
A. crockeri has a moderately elongated scaleless body with a rounded caudal fin. It has short blunt spines towards the front of the head. These spines have branching that extend into smaller branches; the height is slightly larger than the diameter of the eye. There is also one pair of thick cirri over the eyes and nostrils. The dorsal fin starts just above the center of the preoperculum. This species has strong conical teeth. The upper jaw consists of a single row of inward curved conical teeth; teeth are smaller alongside the jaw. The lower jaw is flattened and expands slightly farther than the upper part of the mouth. This mouth shape can be shared with other species in the Acanthemblemaria, such as hancocki. The lower teeth are flattened and parallel to a second row of teeth. A small band of teeth can also be found behind these teeth.

The coloration of the A. crockeri is mostly brown and tan with vertical oval spotting that ranges from brown to reddish coloring. The head is lighter, ranging from yellow to orange. On both sexes the preoperacle is a red-brown oval which is surrounded by a black outline with surrounding white spots. Pectoral and pelvic fins have green-yellow coloration, while the vertical fins are brown-pink; the rays and spins are dusty pink. Pink-red spots can also be found along the caudal fin, dorsal rays, and posterior anal fin. The males exhibit darker brown coloration with white spots and lines, while females are more pale with orange/red blotches

This reef fish also has two color morphs: 'Gulf morph' and 'Cape morph'. The Gulf morph has melanic lateral spots and the Cape has orange spots.

== Geographic Location ==
Chaenopsidae thrive in the Gulf of California and only live in marine environments. They are found in tropical/subtropical areas in coral reefs with rocky structures between 1–60 meters deep and mostly inshore. Browncheek blennies are endemic to this area and are found in the Gulf of California,Mexico and the Southern Gulf of California up to Central America. Six out of the twenty species in the genus Acanthemblemaria can be found in Mexican waters: two in the Atlantic and three in the Pacific Ocean. The blennies family most often is are called "tube blennies" because all species in the family live in holes used by deceased invertebrates, such as burrowing bivalves, barnacles, and coral septa They are reliant on these habitats and close food sources as they provide maximum protection from predators Because of this, they rely on living on the bottom of the water column, also known as benthic.

== Life History ==
Breeding season is from May to July and usually takes place in the Central Gulf, but can sometimes range into the southern portion. During breeding, males will court from their home range, where they spend most of their lifetime, while females deposit eggs. Breeding happens in the tubing habitat, to which males will then guard the eggs until they hatch 4–5 days later. The species is sexually dimorphic, meaning each sex exhibits distinguishing color, size, and structure. They perform rhythmic undulations that circulate water over their eggs. These larvae are then planktonic for 22 to 25 days. A.crockeri exhibits resource defense polygyny mating with male parental care. Studies have shown that females will prefer males that are larger; color did not play a role in mate preference. Discoveries have recently shown that lymphocystis disease is linked to the species; this was discovered by tumor-like growths and enlarged cells. Information is still developing, but studies have shown that it is more common in males and also more frequently in the second year and older groups; these infections could possibly coincide with combat injuries which lead to infection.

== Conservation Status ==
This species is currently listed as least concerned on the IUCN Red list. Even though blennies inhibit shallow coral reefs which can be associated with recreational activities such as snorkeling, swimming,kayaking, and fishing they are often very cautious making direct human disturbances very rare. Since browncheek blennies are a specialist species meaning they need specific living credentials to thrive, they are highly susceptible to ecosystem and environmental changes such as climate change and pollution and could potentially suffer greatly in the future.
