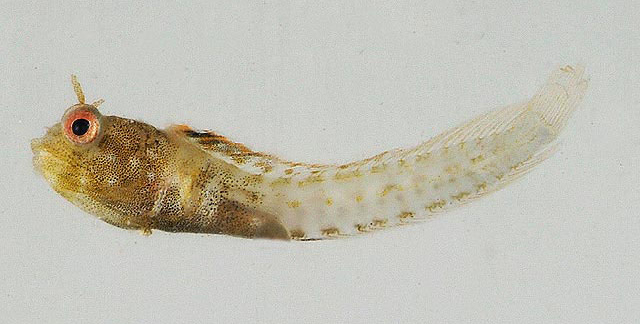

Conservation status
- Least Concern (IUCN 3.1)

Scientific classification
- Kingdom: Animalia
- Phylum: Chordata
- Class: Actinopterygii
- Order: Blenniiformes
- Family: Chaenopsidae
- Genus: Acanthemblemaria
- Species: A. greenfieldi

Binomial name
- Acanthemblemaria greenfieldi Smith-Vaniz & Palacio, 1974
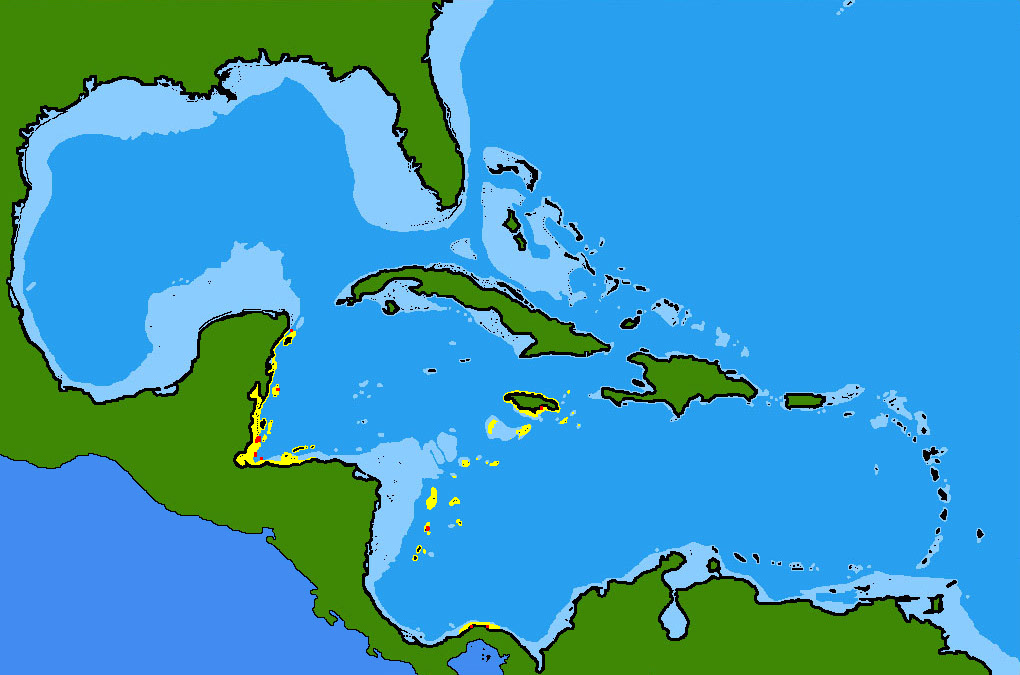

= Acanthemblemaria greenfieldi =

Species of fish

Acanthemblemaria greenfieldi, the false papillose blenny, is a species of chaenopsid blenny found in coral reefs in the western Atlantic ocean. The specific name honours the American ichthyologist David W. Greenfield who identified this species a something new but gave his material to the authors.
