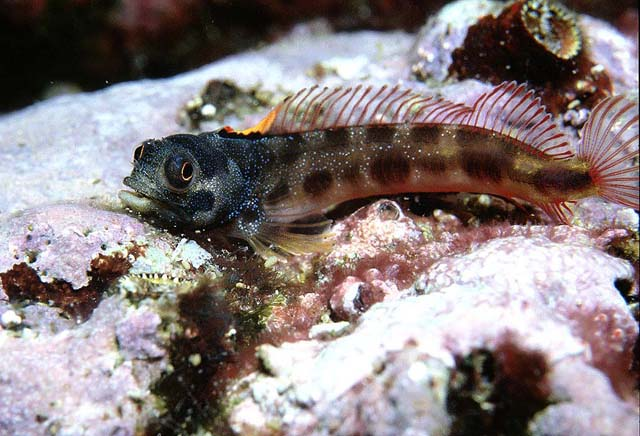

Conservation status
- Least Concern (IUCN 3.1)

Scientific classification
- Kingdom: Animalia
- Phylum: Chordata
- Class: Actinopterygii
- Order: Blenniiformes
- Family: Chaenopsidae
- Genus: Acanthemblemaria
- Species: A. hastingsi

Binomial name
- Acanthemblemaria hastingsi H. C. Lin & Galland, 2010
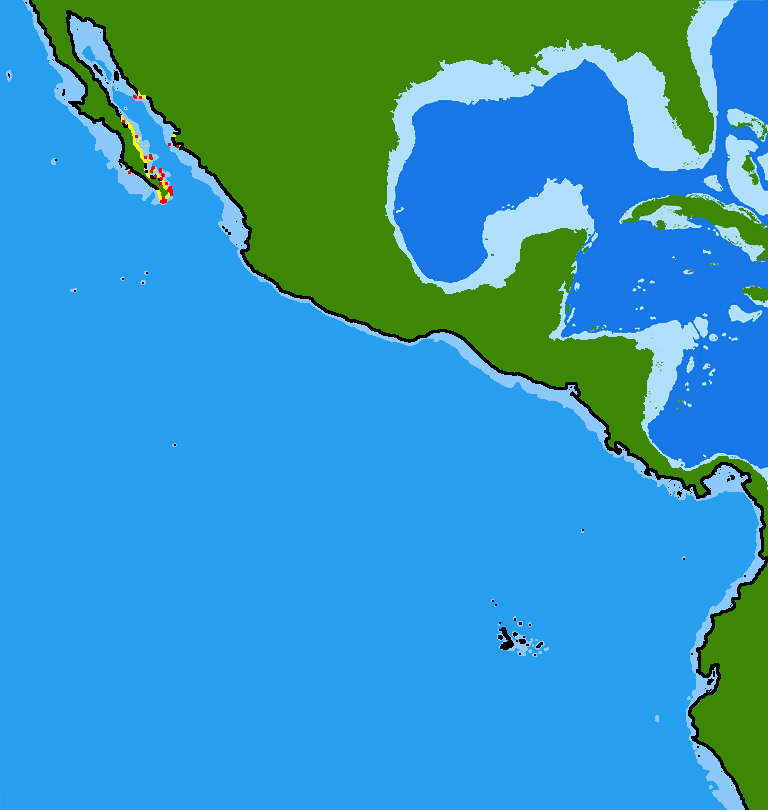

= Acanthemblemaria hastingsi =

Species of fish

Acanthemblemaria hastingsi, the Cortez barnacle blenny, is a species of chaenopsid blenny found in the Gulf of California, in the eastern Pacific Ocean. Males can reach a maximum length of 5.1 cm (2.0 in) SL, while females can reach a maximum length of 4 cm (1.6 in). The specific name honours the marine biologist Philip A. Hastings of the Scripps Institution of Oceanography.
