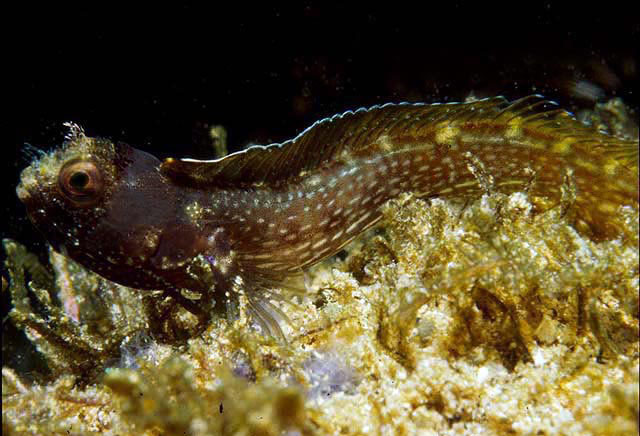

Conservation status
- Least Concern (IUCN 3.1)

Scientific classification
- Kingdom: Animalia
- Phylum: Chordata
- Class: Actinopterygii
- Order: Blenniiformes
- Family: Chaenopsidae
- Genus: Acanthemblemaria
- Species: A. betinensis

Binomial name
- Acanthemblemaria betinensis Smith-Vaniz & Palacio, 1974
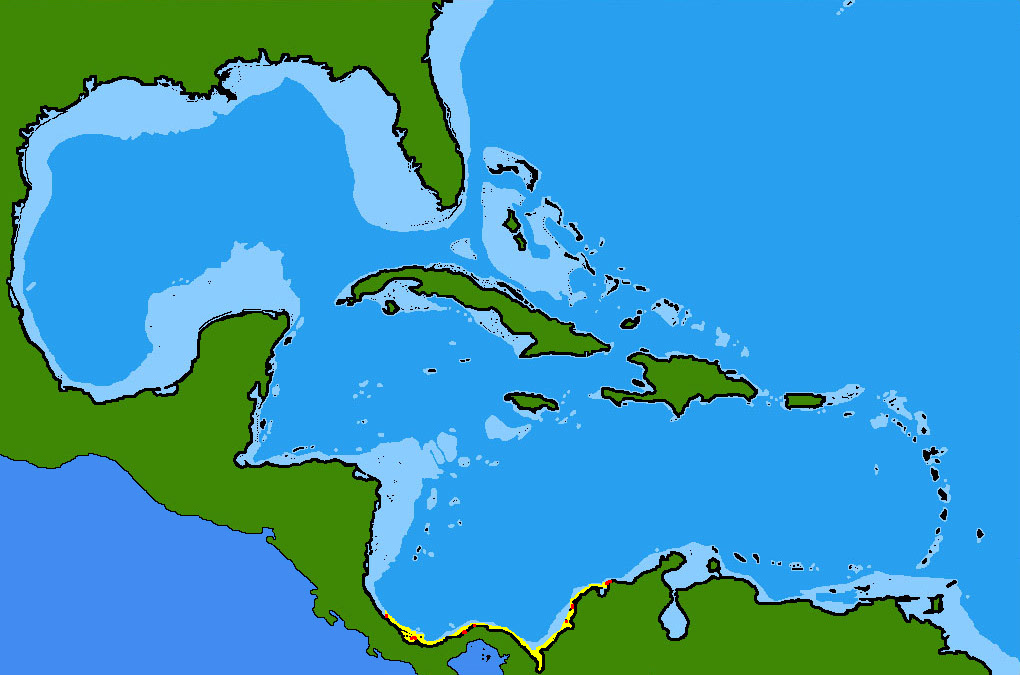

= Acanthemblemaria betinensis =

Species of fish

Acanthemblemaria betinensis, the speckled blenny, is a species of chaenopsid blenny found in coral reefs in the western Caribbean, from Puerto Limón to Colombia.
