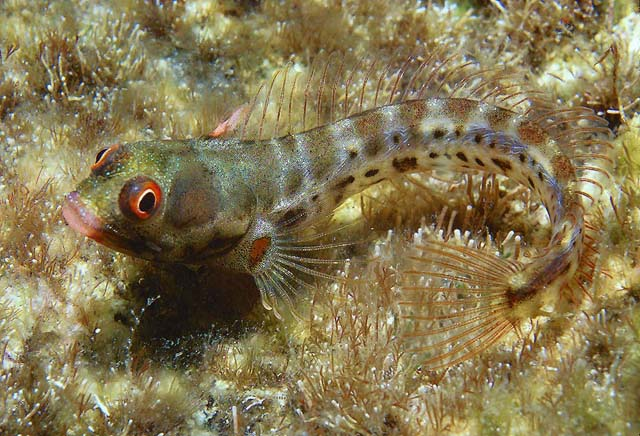

Conservation status
- Least Concern (IUCN 3.1)

Scientific classification
- Kingdom: Animalia
- Phylum: Chordata
- Class: Actinopterygii
- Order: Blenniiformes
- Family: Chaenopsidae
- Genus: Acanthemblemaria
- Species: A. hancocki

Binomial name
- Acanthemblemaria hancocki G. S. Myers & Reid, 1936
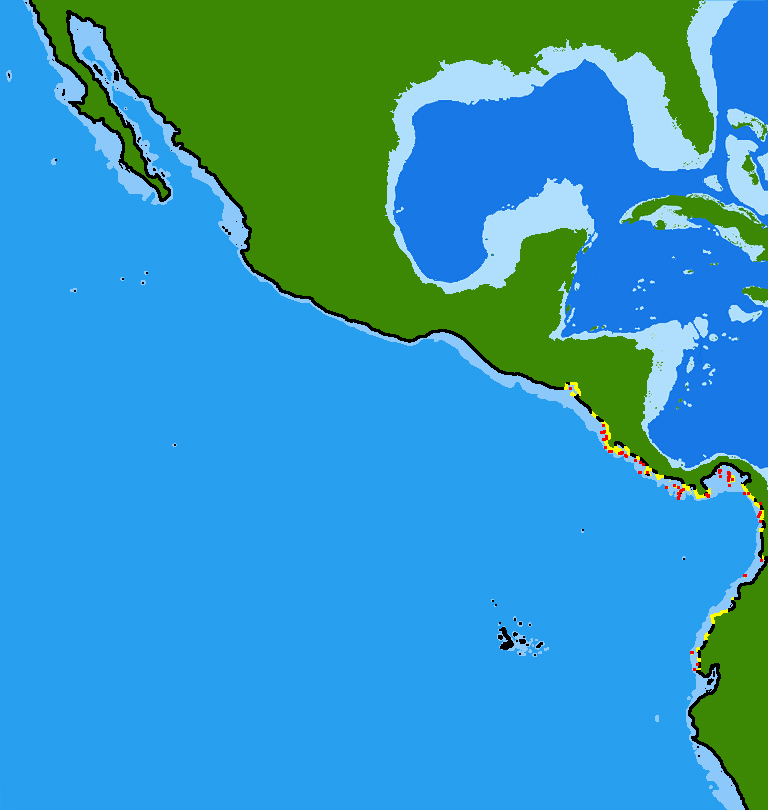

= Acanthemblemaria hancocki =

Species of fish

Acanthemblemaria hancocki, Hancock's blenny, is a species of chaenopsid blenny found in coral reefs around Costa Rica and Panama, in the eastern central Pacific ocean. and can reach a maximum length of 4.5 cm (1.8 in) TL. This species feeds primarily on zooplankton. The specific name honours the leader of the expedition on which the type was collected, the oil magnate and philanthropist Captain George Allan Hancock (1875-1965).
