= Ariel's Song =

Song from The Tempest by William Shakespeare

"Ariel's song" is a verse passage in Scene ii of Act I of William Shakespeare's The Tempest. It consists of two stanzas to be delivered by the spirit Ariel, in the hearing of Ferdinand. In performance it is sometimes sung and sometimes spoken. There is an extant musical setting of the second stanza by Shakespeare's contemporary Robert Johnson, which may have been used in the original production around 1611.

It is the origin of the phrase "full fathom five", after which there are many cultural references, and is an early written record of the phrase sea change.

Through its use of rhyme, rhythm, assonance, and alliteration, the poem sounds like a spell.

== "Full fathom five" ==
"Full fathom five" is the beginning of the second stanza of "Ariel's song", better known than the first stanza, and often presented alone. It implicitly addresses Ferdinand who, with his father, has just gone through a shipwreck in which the father supposedly drowned.

Full fathom five thy father lies;
Of his bones are coral made;
Those are pearls that were his eyes;
Nothing of him that doth fade,
But doth suffer a sea change
Into something rich and strange.
Sea-nymphs hourly ring his knell:
Ding-dong.
Hark! now I hear them — Ding-dong, bell.

== Selected cultural references ==
- Parts or all of it have been set to music by Charles Ives (under the title A Sea Dirge), Henry Purcell (The Tempest, alternatively attributed to John Weldon), Igor Stravinsky (Three Songs from William Shakespeare), Arthur Sullivan (The Tempest), Ralph Vaughan Williams (Three Shakespeare Songs), Pete Seeger (Two from Shakespeare), John Zorn, Marianne Faithfull, Laurie Anderson, and Caroline Shaw.
- On the gravestone of Percy Bysshe Shelley in the Protestant Cemetery in Rome the lines "Nothing of him that doth fade, / But doth suffer a sea-change / Into something rich and strange." are engraved. His open boat, on which he sailed the day he drowned, was called Ariel.
- The title of the Alfred Hitchcock film Rich and Strange (1931) is an allusion to Ariel's Song.
- In The Waste Land, TS Eliot references "Those are pearls that were his eyes" on multiple occasions.
- In Cibola Burn, a novel by James S. A. Corey, a character references the line "Of his bones are coral made".
- The Jackson Pollock painting titled Full Fathom Five; critic Ellen Johnson said of this piece "[It] is especially rich ... Several foreign objects are embedded in its oil and aluminium paint; but the thumb tacks, pennies, cigarettes, paint tube tops, matches, etc., are only discovered with very close scrutiny. Lost in the life of the painting, they 'suffer a sea-change into something rich and strange'."
- The Laurie Anderson track titled Blue Lagoon (in United States I-IV, 1984) a full verse from 'Full Fathom Five...' to '...rich and strange'.

== See also ==
- List of titles of works based on Shakespearean phrases
- Sea change (idiom)
