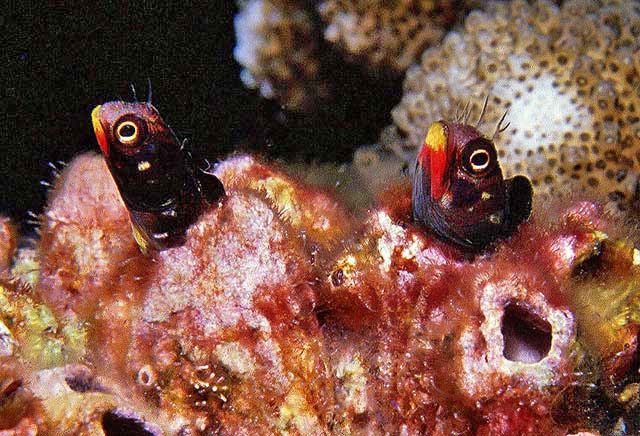

Conservation status
- Vulnerable (IUCN 3.1)

Scientific classification
- Kingdom: Animalia
- Phylum: Chordata
- Class: Actinopterygii
- Order: Blenniiformes
- Family: Chaenopsidae
- Genus: Acanthemblemaria
- Species: A. mangognatha

Binomial name
- Acanthemblemaria mangognatha Hastings & D. R. Robertson, 1999
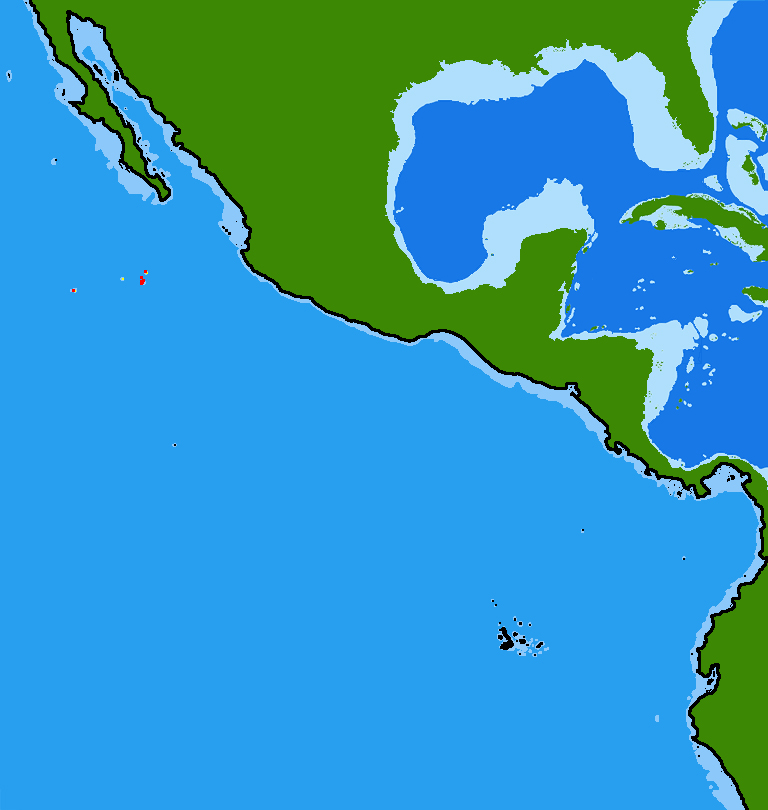

= Acanthemblemaria mangognatha =

Species of fish

Acanthemblemaria mangognatha, the Revillagigedo barnacle blenny or Revillagigedo barnacle, is a species of chaenopsid blenny endemic to the Revillagigedo Islands of Mexico, in the eastern central Pacific ocean. It can reach a maximum length of 3.1 cm (1.2 in) SL.
