= Fathom: Dynamic Data Software =

Software for learning and teaching statistics

- Developers: KCP Technologies, Concord Consortium
- Stable release: 2.3 / May 2015
- Operating system: Windows XP, Windows 7, Windows 8; Mac OS X 10.6 to MacOS 10.14
- Type: Educational software
- License: Proprietary
- Website: fathom.concord.org

Fathom Dynamic Data Software is software for learning and teaching statistics, at the high school and introductory college level.

== Reviews ==
- Technology & Learning Award of Excellence
- MacWorld 2005 Review
- EHO Review
