= Sea change (idiom) =

English idiomatic expression

Sea change or sea-change is an English idiomatic expression that denotes a substantial change in perspective, especially one that affects a group or society at large, on a particular issue. It is similar in usage and meaning to a paradigm shift, and may be viewed as a change to a society or community's zeitgeist, with regard to a specific issue. The phrase evolved from an older and more literal usage when the term referred to an actual "change wrought by the sea", a definition now remaining in very limited usage.

== History ==
The term appears in William Shakespeare's The Tempest in the song Full Fathom Five sung by a supernatural spirit, Ariel, to Ferdinand, a prince of Naples, after Ferdinand's father's apparent death by drowning. The term sea change is used to mean a metamorphosis or alteration.

== Usage ==
A literary character may transform over time into a better person after undergoing various trials or tragedies (e.g. "There is a sea change in Scrooge's personality towards the end of Charles Dickens' A Christmas Carol.") As with the term Potemkin village, sea change has also been used in business culture. In the United States, it is often used as a corporate or institutional buzzword. In this context, it need not refer to a substantial or significant transformation.
