= Samuel Menashe =

American poet

Samuel Menashe (September 16, 1925 – August 22, 2011) was an American poet.

== Biography ==
Born in New York City as Samuel Menashe Weisberg, the son of Russian-Jewish immigrant parents, Menashe grew up in Elmhurst, Queens, and graduated from Townsend Harris High School and from Queens College, where he majored in biochemistry. During World War II he served in the US Army infantry, and in 1944 fought in the Battle of the Bulge. After the war, he used his GI Bill money to study at the Sorbonne where he received a Ph.D. for the thesis Un essai sur l'expérience poétique (étude introspective) in 1950.

In the 1950s, Menashe returned to New York where, except for frequent sojourns in England and Ireland, he lived most of his life. In 1961, he garnered the blessing of the British poet Kathleen Raine who arranged for his first book, The Many Named Beloved, to be published by Victor Gollancz in London. Menashe's short, intense, spiritual poems, which canvass existential dilemmas and use implication and wordplay as a way of deepening the linguistic force of his words, gained wide renown in Britain from reviewers such as Donald Davie, who became one of Menashe's most committed backers. He was later included in the Penguin Modern Poets series.

In 2004 he became the first poet honored with the "Neglected Masters Award" given by Poetry magazine and the Poetry Foundation. The award was also to include a book to be published by the Library of America, which turned out to be a "Selected Poems" edited by Ricks. This volume appeared in 2005 on the occasion of the poet's 80th birthday, and was widely reviewed. A revised edition, with ten additional poems, was published in 2008. Bloodaxe Books in the UK published the volume (which also contained a DVD film about the poet's life and work) in 2009.

Menashe was also a teacher and writing instructor. During the 1960s, he taught literature and poetry courses at C. W. Post College. Previously, he taught at Bard College.

Menashe died in his sleep in New York on August 22, 2011.

== Bibliography ==
- The Many Named Beloved (1961)
- No Jerusalem But This (1971)
- Fringe of Fire (1973)
- To Open (1974)
- Collected Poems (1986)
- Penguin Modern Poets, vol. 7 of the 2nd series (what 1996). Poems by Donald Davie, Samuel Menashe, and Allen Curnow.
- The Niche Narrows (2000)
- New and Selected Poems (2005), introduction by Christopher Ricks.
- The Shrine Whose Shape I Am: The Collected Poetry of Samuel Menashe (2020), Ed. By Bhisham Bherwani and Nicholas Birns, foreword by Stephanie Burt, afterword by Dana Gioia.

See also List of poems by Samuel Menashe.
