= Gordon Waterman Chaplin =

American writer and conservationist

- Born: Philadelphia
- Occupation: Writer, Conservationist

Website
- www.gordonchaplin.com

Gordon Chaplin (born 1945) is an American writer and conservationist.

== Early life and education ==
Chaplin was born in Philadelphia and graduated from St. Paul's School in Concord, New Hampshire. He holds a degree in English literature from Boston University and an MA in American history from Stanford University, where he also attended the Stegner seminar in creative writing.

Chaplin grew up in Nassau, Bahamas, where his father, Charles C. G. Chaplin, worked as an ichthyologist and co-authored the taxonomic textbook Fishes of the Bahamas and Adjacent Tropical Waters (Livingston Press 1968:, University of Texas Press 1992).

== Career ==
Chaplin's first book, Joyride (Coward, McCann & Geoghegan, 1982), is a novel stemming from his experiences in Southeast Asia both as a reporter in Newsweek's Saigon bureau and as an editor on the Bangkok World in Thailand. Its teenaged American protagonists, attending high school in Bangkok where their parents are based, embark on a motorcycle trip to Saigon, hoping to glimpse the war first-hand. The novel was optioned by film director Paul Mazursky, and Chaplin wrote the screenplay for MGM Studios.

After fifteen years as a journalist, the last period of which he spent as a staff writer for the Washington Post Magazine, Chaplin moved to Todos los Santos, Baja California Sur where he worked as a trip leader, divemaster and publicist for Baja Expeditions. There he became involved as a fundraiser and project consultant with the foundation Niparaja, a non-profit group seeking to preserve the marine and coastal areas of the Gulf of California and the Pacific coast of Baja.

Next, he took to the sea himself in the Lord Jim, a 36-foot Dutch-built motorsailor, with his partner Susan Atkinson. His travel-essay book, The Fever Coast Log: At Sea in Central America (Simon & Schuster, 1991) is an account of their voyage down the coast of Central America from Belize to Panama in the final days of the Sandinista regime and its American-backed opponents, the Contras.

His memoir, Dark Wind:: A Survivor’s Tale of Love and Loss (Atlantic Monthly Press, 1999) details the tragedy of their next voyage, which ended with Susan’s death in a typhoon in the Marshall Islands, halfway across the Pacific.

In addition to his journalism, he has contributed articles to Audubon Magazine, Men’s Journal, Esquire, and other publications.

In 2004 Chaplin was invited by a group of scientists from his father’s old institution, The Academy of Natural Sciences in Philadelphia, to participate in a 50-year retrospective study of the coral reef environment he’d frequented as a child, using his father's work as a baseline. His article "Return to the Reefs," and his subsequent book Full Fathom Five: Ocean Warming and a Father’s Legacy (Skyhorse Publishing, 2013) are accounts of this effort. As a research associate at the Academy, he is a co-author of two resulting scientific studies, "Assessing 50-year changes in Bahamian Reef Fish Assemblages: Evidence for Community Response to Recent Disturbances?" and "Detection of Shifts in coral reef fish assemblages structures over 50 years at reefs of New Providence Island, the Bahamas, highlights the value of the Academy of Natural Sciences collections in a changing world". In 2009 he established the Chaplin Fellowship at the Academy of Natural Sciences, occupied by Dr. Katriina Ilves.

Chaplin's most recent book is another novel, Paraíso (Skyhorse Publishing, 2016) set in Todos los Santos, about a gringo brother and sister who whose long estrangement ends in a spectacular rescue.

== Personal life ==
Chaplin lives in New York City and Hebron, New York, with his wife Sarah Teale and daughter Rosie. In Hebron they run a grass-fed beef operation, Rosie’s Beef, and are putting together a farmers co-operative for marketing farm to table production. Chaplin has two daughters from a previous marriage, Diana and Julia.

== Works ==
- The Best of the Post (Popular Library 1979) Selected articles from the Washington Post Magazine
- Joyride (Coward, McCann & Geoghegan 1982) ISBN 978-0-698-11185-1
- The Fever Coast Log: At Sea in Central America (Simon & Schuster 1992) ISBN 978-0-671-76729-7
- Dark Wind: A Survivor’s Tale of Love and Loss (Atlantic Monthly Press 1999) ISBN 978-0-7531-6552-2
- Full Fathom Five: Ocean Warming and a Father’s Legacy (Skyhorse Publishing 2013) ISBN 978-1-61145-895-4
- Paraíso (Skyhorse Publishing 2016) ISBN 978-1-62872-598-8

== Reviews ==
- Booklist, Feb. 1, 1992, March 1, 1999. Alice Joyce, review of The Fever Coast Log, p. 1005. Denise Hoover, Review of Dark Wind: A Survivor’s Tale of Love and Loss p. 1100
- Kirkus Reviews, August 2013, review of Full Fathom Five: Ocean Warming and a Father's Legacy.
- Library Journal, June 15, 1999, Gini Kaiser, review of Dark Wind, a Survivors Tale of Love and Loss, p. 96
- Los Angeles Times Book Review, March 22, 1992, review of The Fever Coast Log, p. 6.
- Nation, Oct. 30, 1982. Arnold Klein, “Newsreel Novels,” p. 438
- Newsweek, Oct. 25, 1982, review of Joyride, p. 118. May 24, 1999, review of Dark Wind, a Survivor’s Tale of Love and Loss., p.&
- Time International, Sept. 6, 1999, Elisabeth Fitzhugh, “In Deep Water.”. p. 64
- Washington Post Bookworld, Sept 26, 1982, David Guy “Easy Riders on the Road to Saigon.:” p. 3. August 23, 1992, Merwyn Morris, “Islands in Flux: Rediscovering the Caribbean” p. 6.
