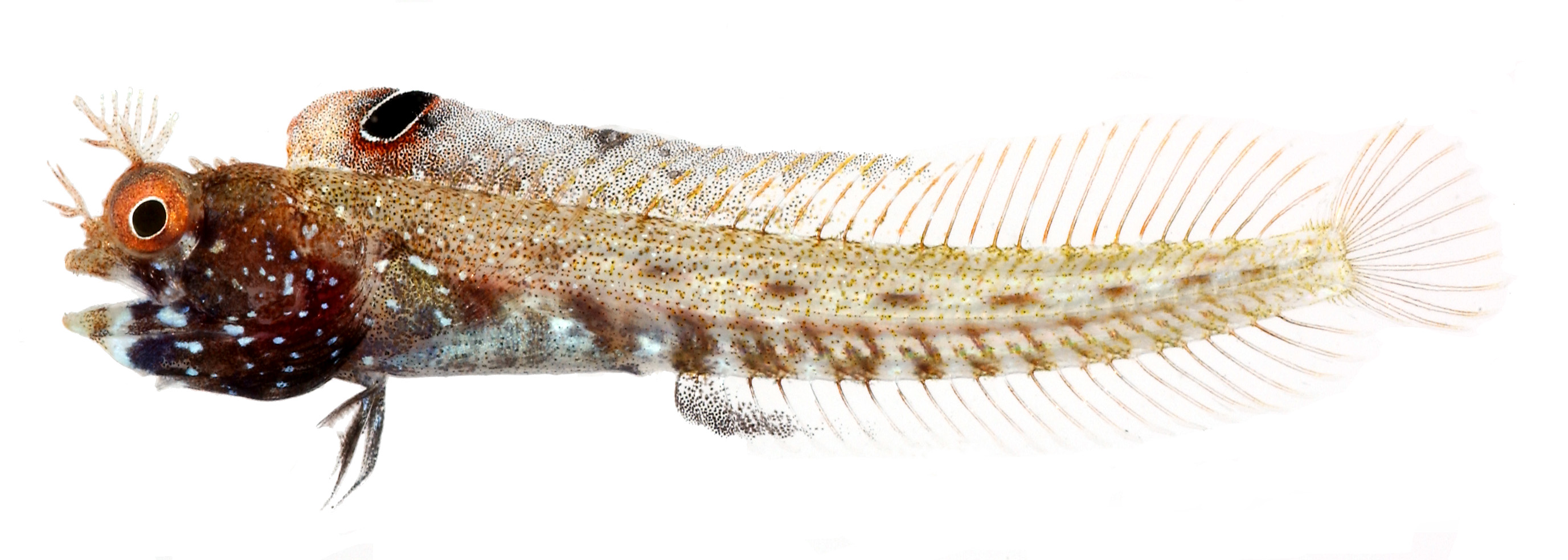
- Adult male
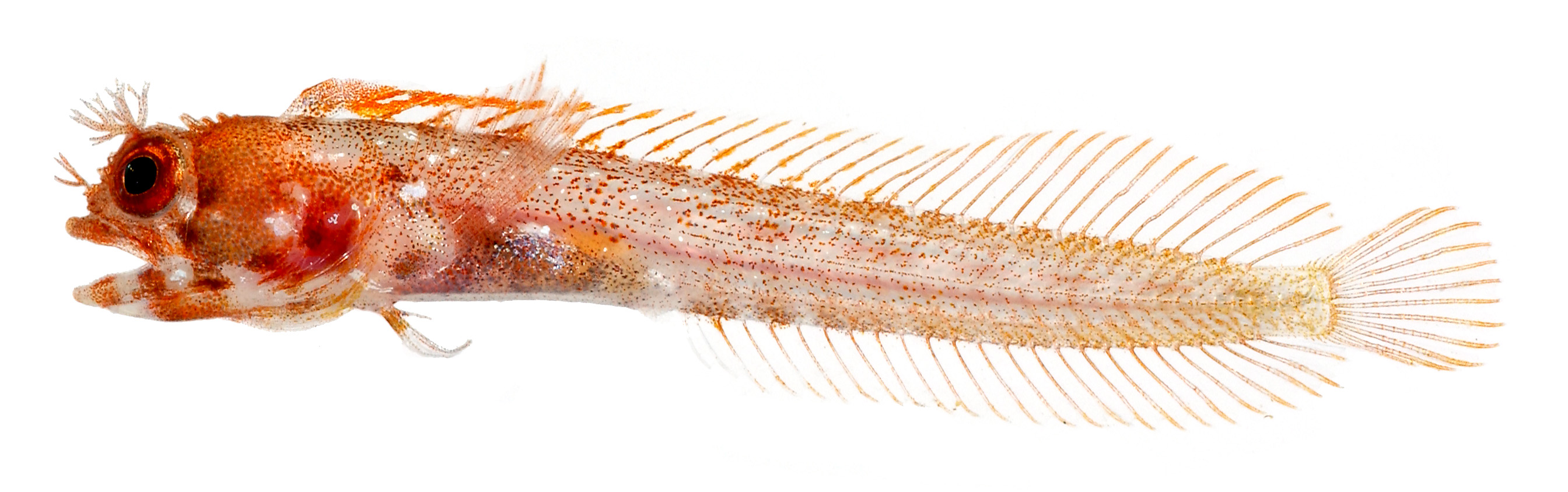
- Adult female

Conservation status
- Least Concern (IUCN 3.1)

Scientific classification
- Kingdom: Animalia
- Phylum: Chordata
- Class: Actinopterygii
- Order: Blenniiformes
- Family: Chaenopsidae
- Genus: Acanthemblemaria
- Species: A. aspera

Binomial name
- Acanthemblemaria aspera (Longley, 1927)
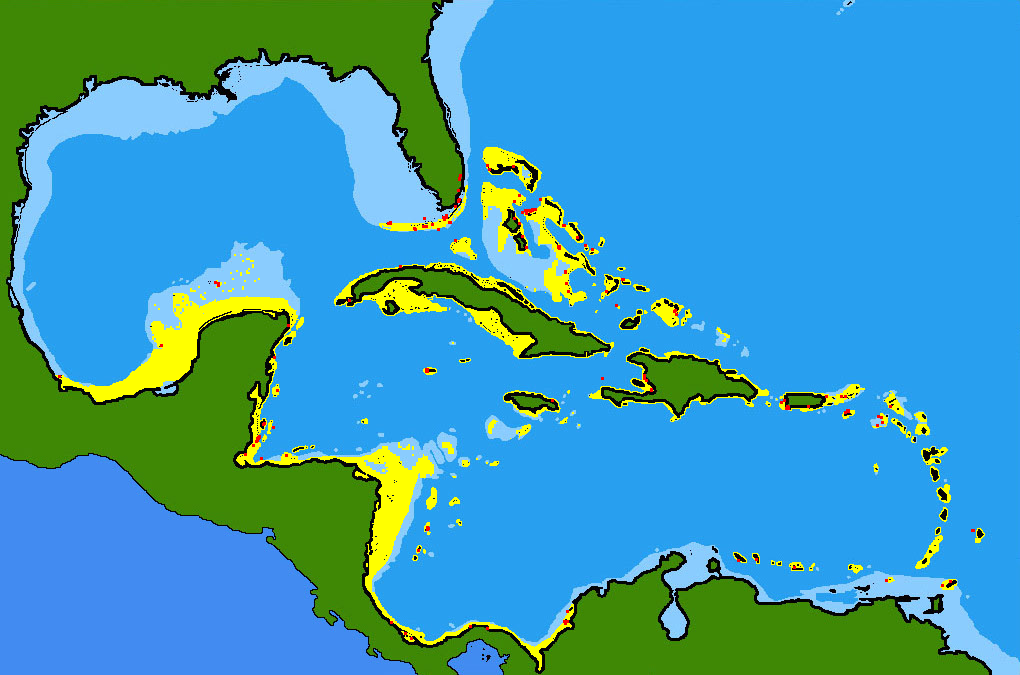

Synonyms
- Paremblemaria aspera Longley, 1927; Acanthemblemaria arborescens Beebe & Tee-Van, 1928

= Acanthemblemaria aspera =

Species of fish

Acanthemblemaria aspera, the roughhead blenny, is a species of blenny native to the tropical western Atlantic Ocean. Typical length is 19 mm (0.75 in) for adult males and 21 mm (0.83 in) for females.
