= Charles C. G. Chaplin =

American ichthyologist

- Born: Charles Clifford Gordon Chaplin; 1906; Ranikhet, United Provinces of Agra and Oudh, British India (present-day Uttarakhand, India)
- Died: 1991 (aged 84–85)
- Citizenship: American
- Education: Eton College
- Occupation: ichthyologist
- Notable work: founder, Exuma Cays Land and Sea Park
- Spouse: Louise Davis Catherwood (m. 1937)
- Children: two, including Gordon
- Awards: International Oceanographic Foundation's Angling Award

Charles Clifford Gordon Chaplin (1906–1991) was an American ichthyologist and author of British origins.

== Personal life ==
Chaplin was born in Ranikhet, India, where his father, a major in the British Army, was stationed. Chaplin grew up in North Wales, UK, and was educated at Eton College, England.

In 1937, he married Louise Davis Catherwood of Philadelphia (1906–1983), and moved to that city. During World War II, he served with the British Consulate in Philadelphia and later became an American citizen.

== Career ==
In the late 1940s Chaplin began his ichthyological work in Nassau, Bahamas, as a research associate for Philadelphia's Academy of Natural Sciences.

=== Fishes of the Bahamas and Adjacent Waters ===
Over the next 15 years, working with his Academy colleague Dr James Böhlke, he studied and collected over 500 species of Bahamian fishes, 65 of them never before described. Their work led to the co-authorship of Fishes of the Bahamas and Adjacent Tropical Waters (1968, with a new edition published in 1992). The book remains the "primary reference for the identification of West Indian fishes". Chaplin and Bohlke pioneered the use of SCUBA gear and the organic ichthyocide rotenone in collecting specimens.

=== Fishwatchers Guide ===
With British artist and conservationist Sir Peter Scott as illustrator, Chaplin then compiled a general interest guide, A Fishwatchers Guide to West Atlantic Coral Reefs, with a pioneering waterproof edition that could be taken underwater by divers. Waterproof fish guides have since become standard.

=== Exuma Cays and Sea Park ===
In 1959, Chaplin and a group of conservationists from Nassau including Ilya Tolstoy, grandson of the writer Leo Tolstoy, founded the Exuma Cays Land and Sea Park, one of the world's first underwater marine reserves. To oversee the park's operation, they established the Bahamas National Trust.

== Awards ==
Chaplin was a recipient of the International Oceanographic Foundation's Angling Award for his contributions to marine science.

== Death ==
Chaplin died in 1991 of an aortic aneurysm. He was survived by son, Gordon Waterman Chaplin and one daughter.

== Reviews ==
- Smith, C.L.. Copeia, Vol. 1969, No. 1, pp. 211–212
- "Fishes of the Bahamas and Adjacent Tropical Waters". American Forests, v.77, Oct 1971, p. 42
- Smith, C.L.. Copeia, Vol. 1994, No. 1, pp. 253–254
- Cowen, R.. The Quarterly Review of Biology, Vol. 69, No. 1 (Mar., 1994), pp. 115–116
