= Cirrus (zoology) =

Long, thin structures in both vertebrate and invertebrate animals

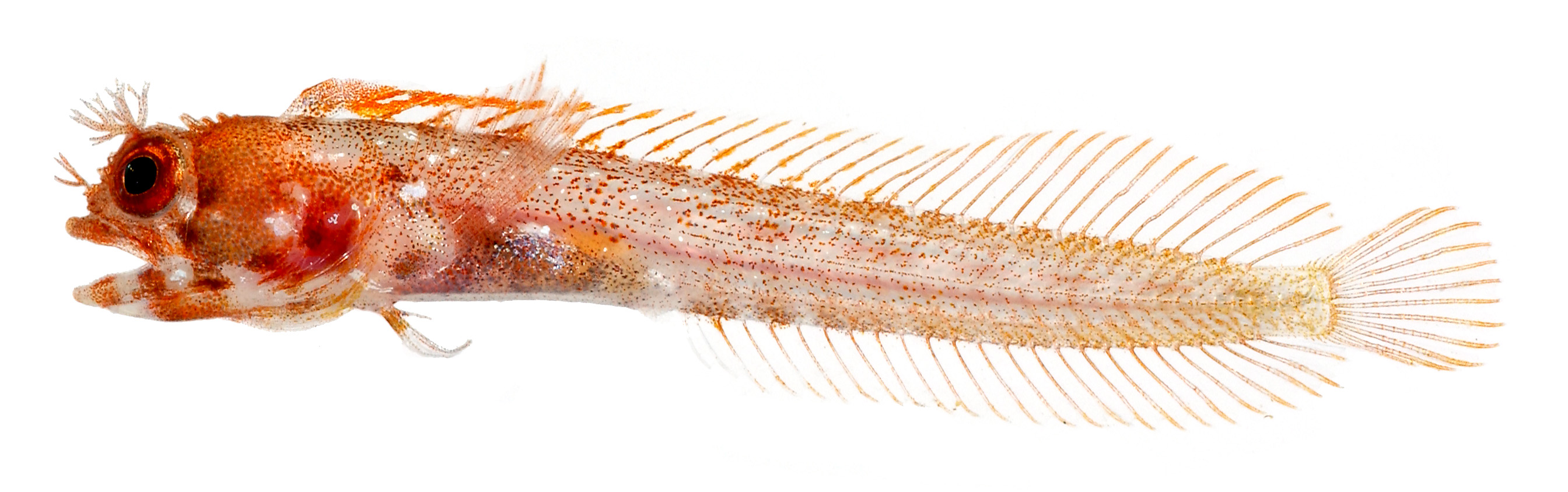
Adult female roughhead blenny with supraorbital cirri

In biology, a cirrus (/ˈsirəs/ SIRR-əs, pl.: cirri, /ˈsɪraɪ/ SIRR-eye, from the Latin cirrus meaning a curl-like tuft or fringe) is a long, thin structure in an animal similar to a tentacle but generally lacking the tentacle's strength, flexibility, thickness, and sensitivity.

In the sheep liver fluke, for example, the cirrus is the worm's muscular penis and when not in use is retained within a cirrus sac or pouch near the animal's head. The same structure exists in the various Taenia species of tapeworm. In the clam worms, however, the cirrus is the tentacular process or growth on each of the feet (parpodia), either the dorsal cirrus or the ventral cirrus, and has nothing to do with reproduction.

Among the bristleworms, a cirrus is a tentacular growth near the head or notopodium containing sense organs and may be either dorsal, ventral, or lamellar. Among the ribbonworms, the caudal cirrus is a small thread-like growth at the posterior end of the worm. Among feather stars or barnacles, a cirrus is a long slender gripping or feeding appendage.

In sea lilies, the cirri are the thin strands that line the animal's stalk. Among the tube blennies, a cirrus is a long growth extending from above the eye (a supraorbital cirrus) or extending below the neck-region (a nuchal cirrus). In a nautilus, each of the animal's tentacles is composed of a thin flexible cirrus and the corresponding hardened and protective cirrus sheath into which the cirri may be withdrawn.
