= New and Selected Poems (Menashe) =

- Author: Samuel Menashe
- Language: English
- Genre: Poetry
- Publisher: Bloodaxe Books
- Publication date: 2009
- Publication place: UK
- Media type: Print (paperback)
- Pages: XXXVI + 202 pp.
- ISBN: 9781852248406
- OCLC: 708333510

New and Selected Poems is a collection of poems by Samuel Menashe, first published in 2005 by the Library of America as part of the American Poets project, after the author received the Neglected Masters Award from the Poetry Foundation. A second (expanded) edition was published in 2008. The 2009 printing by Bloodaxe Books also features a DVD of the film Life is Immense: Visiting Samuel Menashe by Pamela Robertson-Pearce.

== Contents ==
- Giving the Day Its Due, by Samuel Menashe
- The Poets on Samuel Menashe (Donald Davie and Stephen Spender)
- Introduction, by Christopher Ricks
- The Poems

== Critical reception ==
David Orr, writing in The New York Times, described Menashe as a "wry but essentially optimistic poet, and his best writing demonstrates that the stylistic limitations we choose quickly cease to be limitations, even when we identify them as such", singling out Menashe's poem "The Niche" for praise. David Kaufmann, writing in The Forward, noted that "Menashe might well be the most recognized unrecognized American poet of the past 40 years" but suggested New and Selected Poems "could change all that". Clive Wilmer, writing in The Guardian, concurred, writing "The literary world has not been kind to Menashe, as is often the case with poets who make no claims on it" and comparing Menashe to William Blake.
