= Protemblemaria perla =

Conservation status
- Data Deficient (IUCN 3.1)

Scientific classification
- Kingdom: Animalia
- Phylum: Chordata
- Class: Actinopterygii
- Order: Blenniiformes
- Family: Chaenopsidae
- Genus: Protemblemaria
- Species: P. perla

Binomial name
- Protemblemaria perla Hastings, 2001

Species of fish

Protemblemaria perla, the pearl blenny, is a species of chaenopsid blenny.

== Etymology ==
The specific name "perla", used as a noun in apposition, simultaneously refers to the pearly white bar-colouring on the body and to the Pearl Islands, where the three type specimens were collected.

== Description ==
Based on the extremely limited sample available, males of this species are known to reach a maximum length of approximately 4.1 centimetres (1.6 in) SL while females are known to reach approximately 3 centimetres (1.2 in). The blennies are primarily brown and yellow in colour, also displaying the aforementioned white stripes. The eyes of the blenny possess pale irises with yellow or rusty lines stemming from the pupils, and pale blue dots underneath the eye sockets and around the jaws. P. perla shares the radiating lines in its eyes with its sister species P. bicirrus and P. punctata, a trait Hastings describes as being possibly unique to members of Protemblemaria. As is typical of the genus, P. perla possesses fleshy ridges between the eyes and the snout. Hastings theorizes that Protemblemaria perla is most closely related to its southern Caribbean sister taxon P. punctata.

== Distribution ==
The full extent of the distribution of Protemblemaria perla is uncertain, as it is only known from two male and a single female specimen collected from Isla del Rey, Pearl Islands, Panama, in the eastern central Pacific Ocean.
