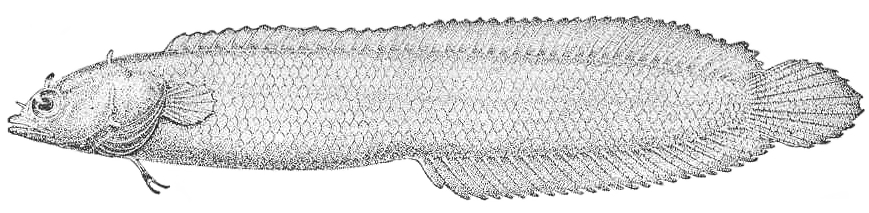

Conservation status
- Least Concern (IUCN 3.1)

Scientific classification
- Kingdom: Animalia
- Phylum: Chordata
- Class: Actinopterygii
- Order: Blenniiformes
- Family: Chaenopsidae
- Genus: Stathmonotus
- Species: S. stahli

Binomial name
- Stathmonotus stahli (Evermann & M. C. Marsh, 1899)

Synonyms
- Auchenistius stahli Evermann & M. C. Marsh, 1899; Histioclinus veliger Metzelaar, 1919

= Stathmonotus stahli =

Species of fish

Stathmonotus stahli, the eelgrass blenny or the seagrass blenny, is a species of chaenopsid blenny found in coral reefs in the western Atlantic ocean. It can reach a maximum length of 4 centimetres (1.6 in) TL. The specific name honours the Puerto Rican physician and biologist Agustín Stahl (1842-1917).
