= Zingaro =

Zingaro is an Italian derogatory word for a Romani man.

Zingaro may also refer to:

- Zíngaro (born 1950), Spanish singer and composer of Romani origin (real name Antonio Salazar Barrull)
- Carlos Zingaro (born 1948), Portuguese violinist and electronic musician
- Lo Zingaro (The Gypsy), a pseudonym of Antonio Solario (active perhaps 1502–1518), an Italian painter of the Venetian school, who worked in Naples, the Marche and possibly England.
- "Zingaro", a song by Antônio Carlos Jobim.

== See also ==
- Lucayablennius zingaro, known commonly as the Arrow blenny found in the Bahamas, Cuba, Puerto Rico, the United Kingdom, and the United States. A species of chaenopsid blenny
- Riserva naturale dello Zingaro, natural reserve in Sicily, Italy
