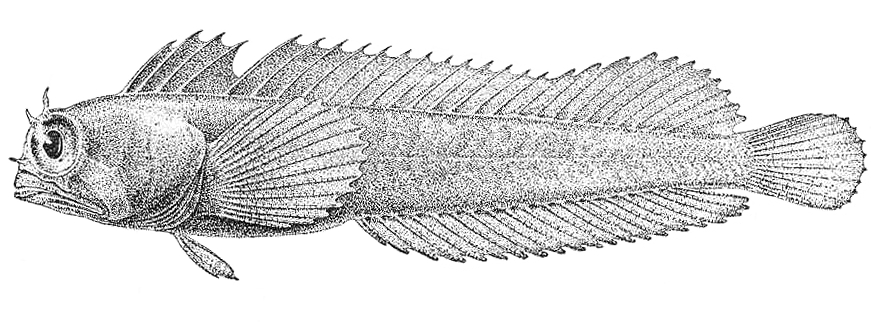

Conservation status
- Least Concern (IUCN 3.1)

Scientific classification
- Kingdom: Animalia
- Phylum: Chordata
- Class: Actinopterygii
- Order: Blenniiformes
- Family: Chaenopsidae
- Genus: Coralliozetus
- Species: C. cardonae

Binomial name
- Coralliozetus cardonae Evermann & M. C. Marsh, 1899

Synonyms
- Chaenopsis cardonae (Evermann & M. C. Marsh, 1899)

= Coralliozetus cardonae =

Species of fish

Coralliozetus cardonae, the twinhorn blenny, is a species of chaenopsid blenny found in coral reefs in the western Atlantic ocean. It can reach a maximum length of 8.5 centimetres (3.3 in) TL.
