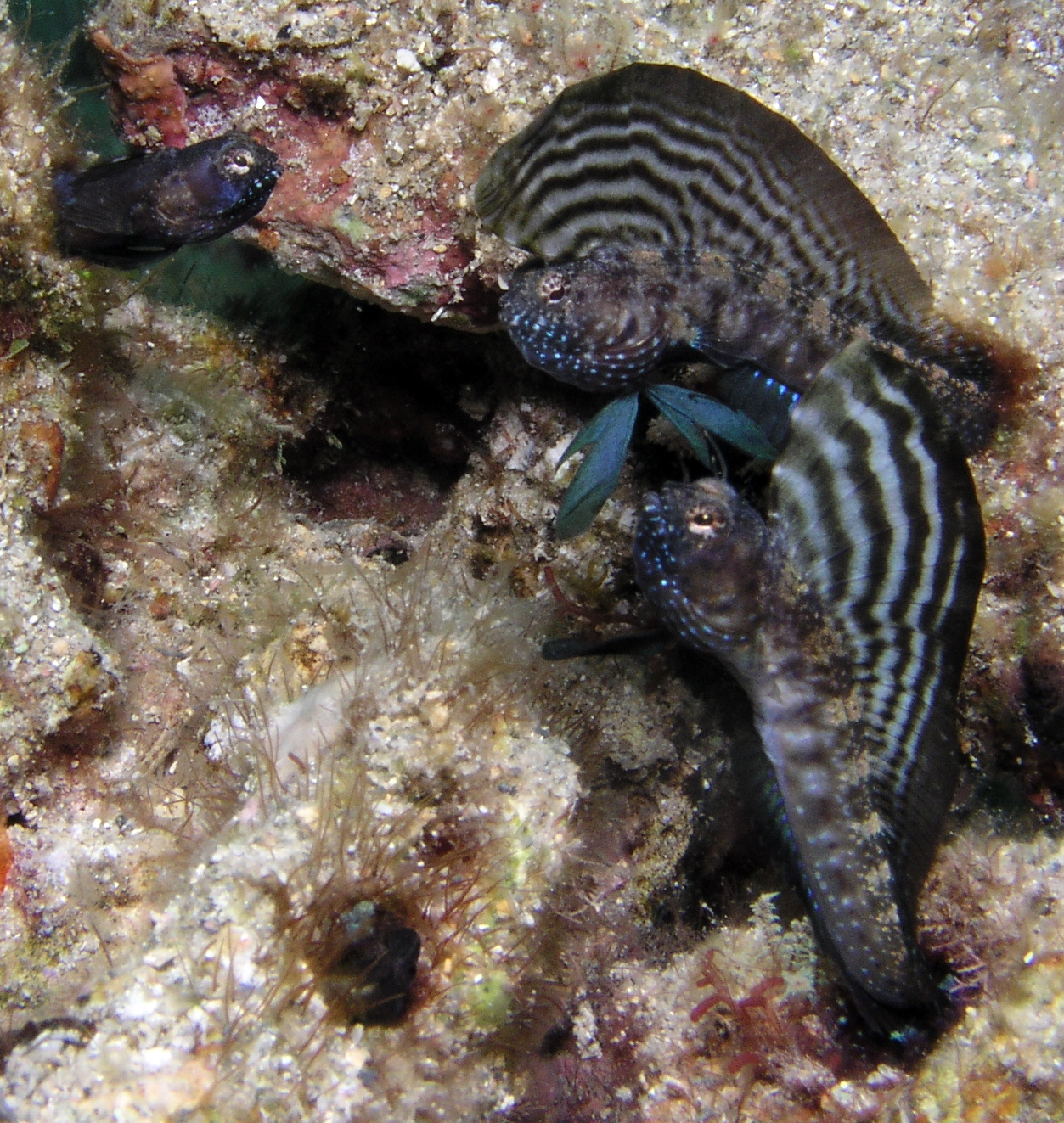

Conservation status
- Least Concern (IUCN 3.1)

Scientific classification
- Kingdom: Animalia
- Phylum: Chordata
- Class: Actinopterygii
- Order: Blenniiformes
- Family: Chaenopsidae
- Genus: Emblemaria
- Species: E. pandionis

Binomial name
- Emblemaria pandionis Evermann & M. C. Marsh, 1900

= Emblemaria pandionis =

Sailfin blenny

Species of fish

Emblemaria pandionis, the sailfin blenny, is a species of marine fish from the family Chaenopsidae. It occurs in the Caribbean Sea. It occasionally makes its way into the aquarium trade. It grows to a maximum length of 6 centimetres (2.4 in) SL.
