= Emblemaria hyltoni =

Conservation status
- Data Deficient (IUCN 3.1)

Scientific classification
- Kingdom: Animalia
- Phylum: Chordata
- Class: Actinopterygii
- Order: Blenniiformes
- Family: Chaenopsidae
- Genus: Emblemaria
- Species: E. hyltoni

Binomial name
- Emblemaria hyltoni R. K. Johnson & D. W. Greenfield, 1976

Species of fish

Emblemaria hyltoni, the filament blenny, is a species of chaenopsid blenny found around Belize and Honduras, in the western Atlantic ocean. It can reach a maximum length of 3 centimetres (1.2 in) TL. The specific name honours Nick Hylton who acted as captain and crew of the yacht Miss Sabrina during the authors expedition to the Mosquito Coast in 1975.
