= Stathmonotus sinuscalifornici =

Conservation status
- Least Concern (IUCN 3.1)

Scientific classification
- Kingdom: Animalia
- Phylum: Chordata
- Class: Actinopterygii
- Order: Blenniiformes
- Family: Chaenopsidae
- Genus: Stathmonotus
- Species: S. sinuscalifornici

Binomial name
- Stathmonotus sinuscalifornici (Chabanaud, 1942)

Synonyms
- Parastathmonotus sinuscalifornici Chabanaud, 1942

Species of fish

Stathmonotus sinuscalifornici, the California worm blenny or the Gulf worm blenny, is a species of chaenopsid blenny known from the Gulf of California, in the eastern central Pacific ocean. It can reach a maximum length of 6.5 centimetres (2.6 in) TL. This species feeds primarily on zooplankton.
