= Chaenopsis deltarrhis =

Conservation status
- Data Deficient (IUCN 3.1)

Scientific classification
- Kingdom: Animalia
- Phylum: Chordata
- Class: Actinopterygii
- Order: Blenniiformes
- Family: Chaenopsidae
- Genus: Chaenopsis
- Species: C. deltarrhis

Binomial name
- Chaenopsis deltarrhis J. E. Böhlke, 1957

Species of fish

Chaenopsis deltarrhis, the Delta pikeblenny, is a species of chaenopsid blenny found from Costa Rica to Colombia, in the eastern central Pacific ocean. It can reach a maximum length of 7.5 centimetres (3.0 in) TL. This species feeds primarily on zooplankton.
