= Chaenopsis coheni =

Conservation status
- Data Deficient (IUCN 3.1)

Scientific classification
- Kingdom: Animalia
- Phylum: Chordata
- Class: Actinopterygii
- Order: Blenniiformes
- Family: Chaenopsidae
- Genus: Chaenopsis
- Species: C. coheni

Binomial name
- Chaenopsis coheni J. E. Böhlke, 1957

Species of fish

Chaenopsis coheni, the Cortez pikeblenny, is a species of chaenopsid blenny found around the Isla Angel de la Guarda, in the Gulf of California, in the eastern central Pacific ocean. It has not been recorded since 1965. The specific name honours Daniel M. Cohen (1930-2017) of Stanford University who accompanied Böhlke on the expedition that collected the type.
