= Hard Road =

Hard Road may refer to:

== Music ==
=== Albums ===
- Hard Road (Stevie Wright album), 1974
- Hard Road, an album by the 2nd South Carolina String Band, 2001
- Hard Road (Christone Ingram album), 2025
- A Hard Road, a 1967 album by John Mayall and the Bluesbreakers
- The Hard Road, a 2006 album by the Australian group Hilltop Hoods

=== Songs ===
- "The Hard Road" (song), a 2006 single by Hilltop Hoods
- "Hard Road", 1978 song by Black Sabbath from Never Say Die!
- "Hard Road", single by Sam Roberts from his 2003 album We Were Born in a Flame
- "Hard Road", U.S. title of "Wring That Neck", song by Deep Purple from their 1968 album The Book of Taliesyn
- "Hard Road," a song by Labi Siffre 1987
- "Hard Road," a song by Zingaro (singer) 1978
- "Hard Road," a song by Brownstone (group), Gisonno, Hofman, Seiberg 1973
- "Hard Road," a song by Lake (German band), 1979
- "Hard Road," a song by The Shore (band)
