= Emblemaria diphyodontis =

Conservation status
- Least Concern (IUCN 3.1)

Scientific classification
- Kingdom: Animalia
- Phylum: Chordata
- Class: Actinopterygii
- Order: Blenniiformes
- Family: Chaenopsidae
- Genus: Emblemaria
- Species: E. diphyodontis

Binomial name
- Emblemaria diphyodontis J. S. Stephens & Cervigón, 1970

Species of fish

Emblemaria diphyodontis, the Venezuelan blenny, is a species of chaenopsid blenny found around Cubagua Island, Venezuela, in the western Atlantic ocean. It can reach a maximum length of 7 centimetres (2.8 in) TL.

Emblemaria diphyodontis has 20–22 dorsal spines, 13–15 dorsal soft rays, 2 anal spines, and 22–24 anal soft rays. It is a harmless species that feeds on small invertebrates and is not evaluated by CITES or CMS. Emblemaria diphyodontis has a low vulnerability to fishing.
