= Stathmonotus lugubris =

Conservation status
- Least Concern (IUCN 3.1)

Scientific classification
- Kingdom: Animalia
- Phylum: Chordata
- Class: Actinopterygii
- Order: Blenniiformes
- Family: Chaenopsidae
- Genus: Stathmonotus
- Species: S. lugubris

Binomial name
- Stathmonotus lugubris J. E. Böhlke, 1953

Species of fish

Stathmonotus lugubris, the Mexican worm blenny, is a species of chaenopsid blenny known from southern Mexico, in the eastern central Pacific ocean.
