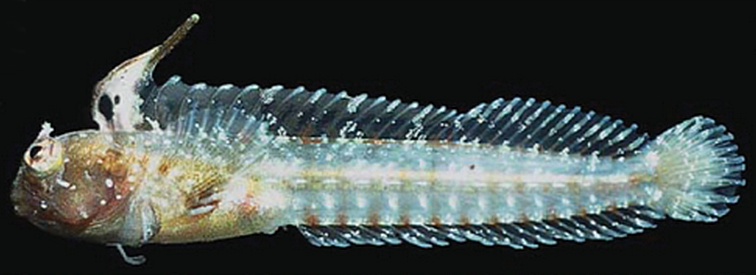

Conservation status
- Least Concern (IUCN 3.1)

Scientific classification
- Kingdom: Animalia
- Phylum: Chordata
- Class: Actinopterygii
- Order: Blenniiformes
- Family: Chaenopsidae
- Genus: Coralliozetus
- Species: C. rosenblatti

Binomial name
- Coralliozetus rosenblatti J. S. Stephens, 1963

= Coralliozetus rosenblatti =

Species of fish

Coralliozetus rosenblatti, the spikefin blenny, is a species of chaenopsid blenny found in coral reefs in the eastern central Pacific ocean. It can reach a maximum length of 3.5 centimetres (1.4 in) TL. This species feeds primarily on zooplankton. The specific name honours the ichthyologist Richard H. Rosenblatt (1930-2014) of the Scripps Institution of Oceanography.
