= Emblemariopsis ruetzleri =

Conservation status
- Least Concern (IUCN 3.1)

Scientific classification
- Kingdom: Animalia
- Phylum: Chordata
- Class: Actinopterygii
- Order: Blenniiformes
- Family: Chaenopsidae
- Genus: Emblemariopsis
- Species: E. ruetzleri

Binomial name
- Emblemariopsis ruetzleri D. M. Tyler & J. C. Tyler, 1997

Species of fish

Emblemariopsis ruetzleri is a species of chaenopsid blenny found around Belize, in the western central Atlantic ocean. The specific name honours Klaus Ruetzler, Curator of Invertebrate Zoology at the National Museum of Natural History.
