= Coralliozetus springeri =

Conservation status
- Least Concern (IUCN 3.1)

Scientific classification
- Kingdom: Animalia
- Phylum: Chordata
- Class: Actinopterygii
- Order: Blenniiformes
- Family: Chaenopsidae
- Genus: Coralliozetus
- Species: C. springeri

Binomial name
- Coralliozetus springeri J. S. Stephens & R. K. Johnson, 1966

Species of fish

Coralliozetus springeri is a species of chaenopsid blenny found in coral reefs from Costa Rica to Ecuador in the eastern central Pacific ocean. It can reach a maximum length of 2.5 centimetres (0.98 in) TL. This species feeds primarily on zooplankton. The specific name honours the ichthyologist Victor G. Springer of the US National Museum.
