= Coralliozetus boehlkei =

Conservation status
- Least Concern (IUCN 3.1)

Scientific classification
- Kingdom: Animalia
- Phylum: Chordata
- Class: Actinopterygii
- Order: Blenniiformes
- Family: Chaenopsidae
- Genus: Coralliozetus
- Species: C. boehlkei

Binomial name
- Coralliozetus boehlkei J. S. Stephens, 1963

Species of fish

Coralliozetus boehlkei, the barcheek blenny, is a species of chaenopsid blenny found from the Gulf of California to Costa Rica, in the eastern central Pacific ocean. The specific name honours the ichthyologist James E. Böhlke (1930–1982) of the Academy of Natural Sciences of Philadelphia.
