= Emblemariopsis arawak =

Conservation status
- Data Deficient (IUCN 3.1)

Scientific classification
- Kingdom: Animalia
- Phylum: Chordata
- Class: Actinopterygii
- Order: Blenniiformes
- Family: Chaenopsidae
- Genus: Emblemariopsis
- Species: E. arawak

Binomial name
- Emblemariopsis arawak Victor, 2010

Species of fish

Emblemariopsis arawak, the Araw glass blenny, is a species of chaenopsid blenny known from tropical reefs in the Caribbean Sea. This species can reach a length of 1.1 centimetres (0.43 in) SL.

== Etymology ==
The species epithet refers to the Arawak people of the Antilles.
