= Emblemariopsis randalli =

Conservation status
- Data Deficient (IUCN 3.1)

Scientific classification
- Kingdom: Animalia
- Phylum: Chordata
- Class: Actinopterygii
- Order: Blenniiformes
- Family: Chaenopsidae
- Genus: Emblemariopsis
- Species: E. randalli

Binomial name
- Emblemariopsis randalli Cervigón, 1965

Synonyms
- Coralliozetus randalli (Cervigón, 1965)

Species of fish

Emblemariopsis randalli, the hornless blenny, is a species of chaenopsid blenny found in coral reefs around Cubagua, Venezuela, in the western central Atlantic ocean. It can reach a maximum length of 3.8 centimetres (1.5 in) TL. This species feeds primarily on zooplankton. The specific name honours the ichthyologist John Ernest Randall who collected the type specimens and provided them to Fernando Cervigón for him to describe.
