= Ekemblemaria myersi =

Conservation status
- Least Concern (IUCN 3.1)

Scientific classification
- Kingdom: Animalia
- Phylum: Chordata
- Class: Actinopterygii
- Order: Blenniiformes
- Family: Chaenopsidae
- Genus: Ekemblemaria
- Species: E. myersi

Binomial name
- Ekemblemaria myersi J. S. Stephens, 1963

Species of fish

Ekemblemaria myersi, the reefsand blenny, is a species of chaenopsid blenny found from the Gulf of California to Colombia, in the eastern central Pacific ocean. It can reach a maximum length of 7 centimetres (2.8 in) TL. This species feeds primarily on zoobenthos. The specific name honours the ichthyologist George S. Myers (1905-1985) of Stanford University.
