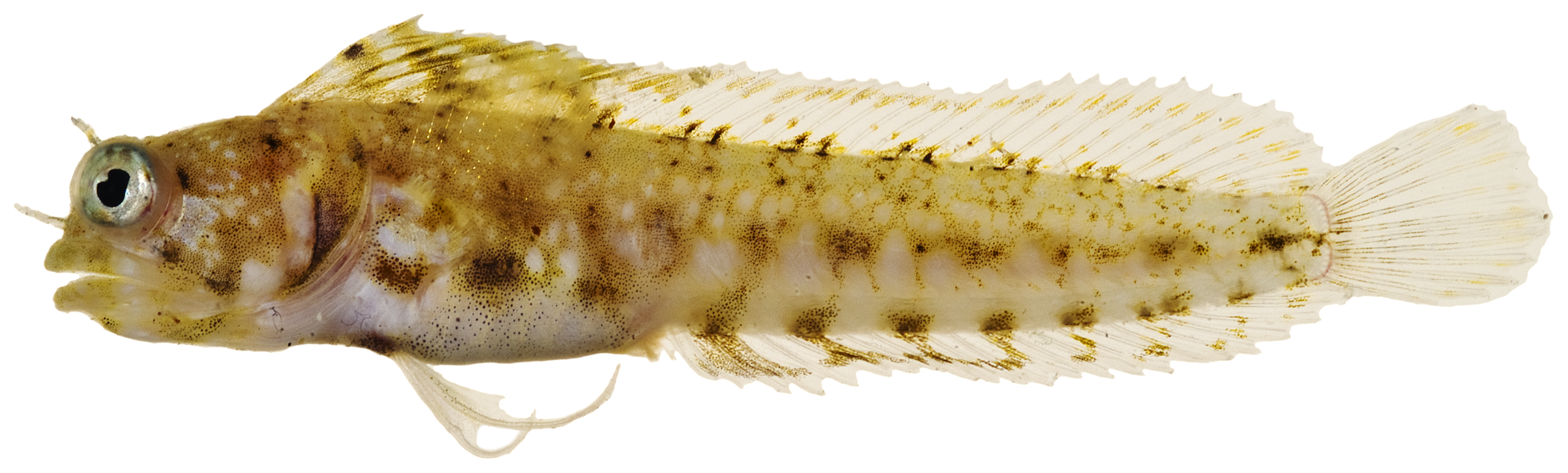
- Emblemaria pandionis

Scientific classification
- Kingdom: Animalia
- Phylum: Chordata
- Class: Actinopterygii
- Order: Blenniiformes
- Family: Chaenopsidae
- Genus: Emblemaria; D. S. Jordan & C. H. Gilbert, 1883

Type species
- Emblemaria nivipes D. S. Jordan & C. H. Gilbert, 1883

= Emblemaria =

Genus of fishes

Emblemaria is a genus of chaenopsid blennies found throughout the Pacific and Atlantic oceans, mainly around the Americas.

== Species ==
There are currently 16 recognized species in this genus:

- Emblemaria atlantica D. S. Jordan & Evermann, 1898 (Banner blenny)
- Emblemaria australis R. T. C. Ramos, C. R. Rocha & L. A. Rocha, 2003
- Emblemaria biocellata J. S. Stephens, 1970 (Twospot blenny)
- Emblemaria caldwelli J. S. Stephens, 1970 (Caribbean blenny)
- Emblemaria caycedoi Acero P., 1984 (Colombian blenny)
- Emblemaria culmenis J. S. Stephens, 1970 (Ridge blenny)
- Emblemaria diphyodontis J. S. Stephens & Cervigón, 1970 (Venezuelan blenny)
- Emblemaria hudsoni Evermann & Radcliffe, 1917
- Emblemaria hyltoni R. K. Johnson & D. W. Greenfield, 1976 (Filament blenny)
- Emblemaria hypacanthus (O. P. Jenkins & Evermann, 1889) (Gulf signal blenny)
- Emblemaria nivipes D. S. Jordan & C. H. Gilbert, 1883 (Whiteback signal blenny)
- Emblemaria pandionis Evermann & M. C. Marsh, 1900 (Sailfin blenny)
- Emblemaria piratica Ginsburg, 1942 (Sailfin signal blenny)
- Emblemaria piratula Ginsburg & Reid, 1942 (Pirate blenny)
- Emblemaria vitta J. T. Williams, 2002 (Ribbon blenny)
- Emblemaria walkeri J. S. Stephens, 1963 (Elusive signal blenny)
