= Emblemariopsis bahamensis =

Conservation status
- Least Concern (IUCN 3.1)

Scientific classification
- Kingdom: Animalia
- Phylum: Chordata
- Class: Actinopterygii
- Order: Blenniiformes
- Family: Chaenopsidae
- Genus: Emblemariopsis
- Species: E. bahamensis

Binomial name
- Emblemariopsis bahamensis J. S. Stephens, 1961

Synonyms
- Chaenopsis bahamensis (Stephens, 1961); Coralliozetus bahamensis (Stephens, 1961); Emblemaria bahamensis (Stephens, 1961)

Species of fish

Emblemariopsis bahamensis, the blackhead blenny, is a species of chaenopsid blenny found in coral reefs in the western Atlantic ocean. It and can reach a maximum length of 2.5 centimetres (0.98 in) TL.
