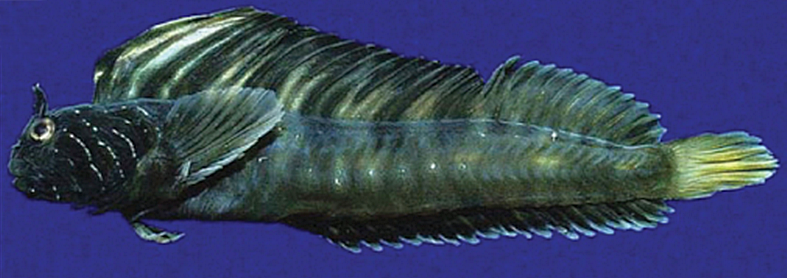

Conservation status
- Least Concern (IUCN 3.1)

Scientific classification
- Kingdom: Animalia
- Phylum: Chordata
- Class: Actinopterygii
- Order: Blenniiformes
- Family: Chaenopsidae
- Genus: Coralliozetus
- Species: C. micropes

Binomial name
- Coralliozetus micropes (Beebe & Tee-Van, 1938)

Synonyms
- Emblemaria micropes Beebe & Tee-Van, 1938

= Coralliozetus micropes =

Species of fish

Coralliozetus micropes, also known as the Scarletfin blenny, is a species of chaenopsid blenny found in coral reefs in the eastern central Pacific ocean. It can reach a maximum length of 4 centimetres (1.6 in) TL. This species feeds primarily on zooplankton.
