= Ekemblemaria nigra =

Conservation status
- Least Concern (IUCN 3.1)

Scientific classification
- Kingdom: Animalia
- Phylum: Chordata
- Class: Actinopterygii
- Order: Blenniiformes
- Family: Chaenopsidae
- Genus: Ekemblemaria
- Species: E. nigra

Binomial name
- Ekemblemaria nigra (Meek & Hildebrand, 1928)

Synonyms
- Emblemaria nigra; Meek & Hildebrand, 1928

Species of fish

Ekemblemaria nigra, the moth blenny, is a species of chaenopsid blenny found in coral reefs around Colombia and Panama, in the western Atlantic Ocean. It can reach a maximum length of 4.2 centimetres (1.7 in) TL.
