= Stathmonotus gymnodermis =

Conservation status
- Least Concern (IUCN 3.1)

Scientific classification
- Kingdom: Animalia
- Phylum: Chordata
- Class: Actinopterygii
- Order: Blenniiformes
- Family: Chaenopsidae
- Genus: Stathmonotus
- Species: S. gymnodermis

Binomial name
- Stathmonotus gymnodermis V. G. Springer, 1955

Species of fish

Stathmonotus gymnodermis, the naked blenny, is a species of chaenopsid blenny found in coral reefs from the Bahamas and Puerto Rico to coasts of northern South America, in the western Atlantic ocean. It can reach a maximum length of 4 centimetres (1.6 in) TL.
