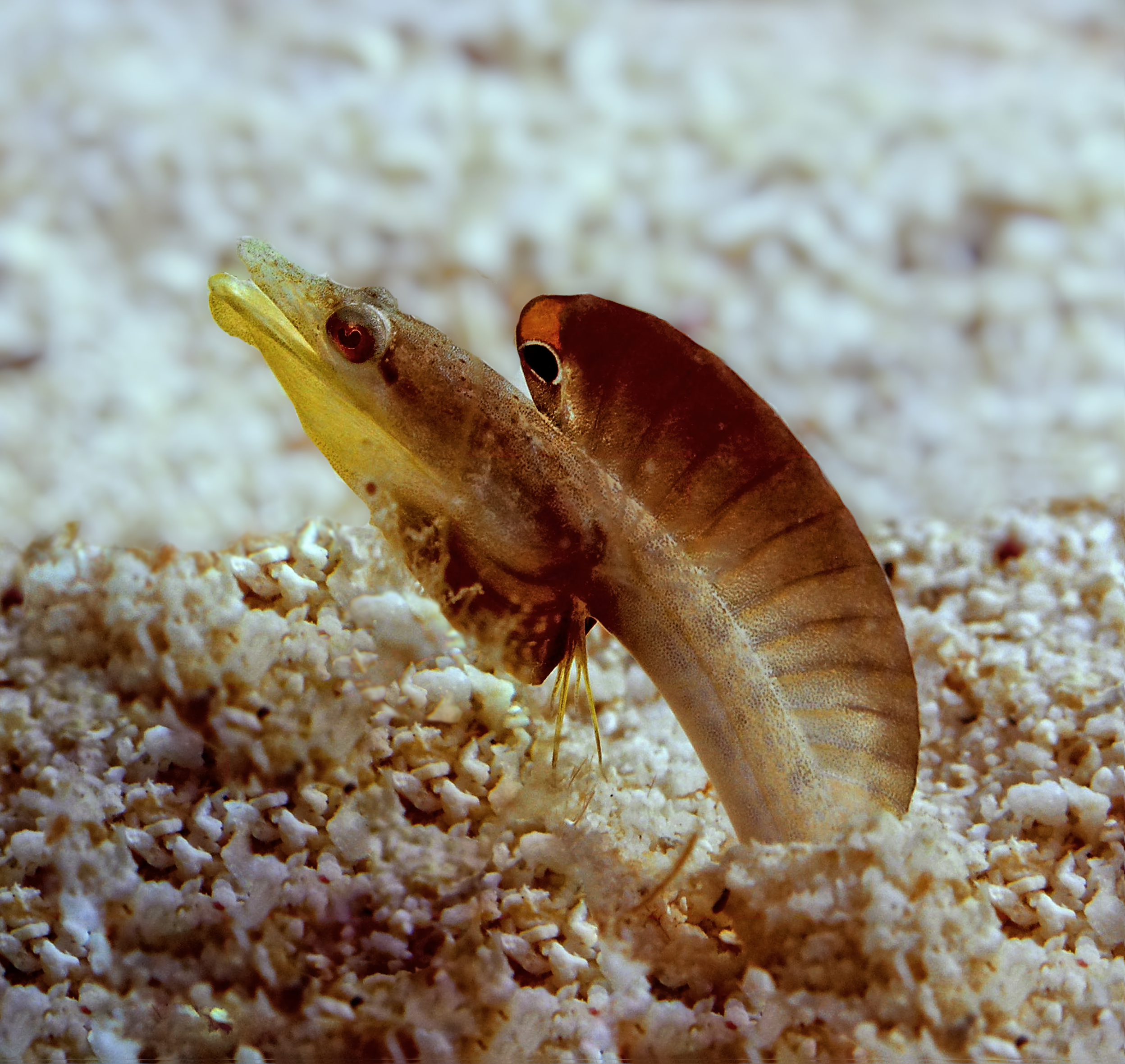

Conservation status
- Least Concern (IUCN 3.1)

Scientific classification
- Kingdom: Animalia
- Phylum: Chordata
- Class: Actinopterygii
- Division: Teleostei
- Order: Blenniiformes
- Family: Chaenopsidae
- Genus: Chaenopsis
- Species: C. limbaughi

Binomial name
- Chaenopsis limbaughi C. R. Robins & J. E. Randall, 1965

= Yellowface pikeblenny =

Species of fish

The yellowface pikeblenny (Chaenopsis limbaughi) is a species of chaenopsid blenny found in coral reefs in the western central Atlantic, including the Bahamas and Caribbean. It can reach a maximum length of 8.5 centimetres (3.3 in) TL. This species feeds primarily on crustaceans, finfish, and worms and can be found in the commercial aquarium trade. The specific name honours the zoologist, diver and underwater photographer Conrad Limbaugh (1925-1960).

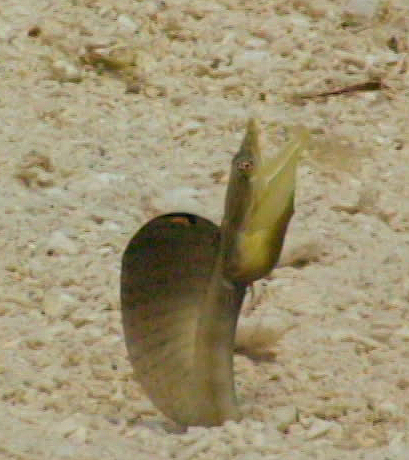
In the Bahamas
