= Emblemaria australis =

Conservation status
- Least Concern (IUCN 3.1)

Scientific classification
- Kingdom: Animalia
- Phylum: Chordata
- Class: Actinopterygii
- Order: Blenniiformes
- Family: Chaenopsidae
- Genus: Emblemaria
- Species: E. australis

Binomial name
- Emblemaria australis R. T. C. Ramos, C. R. Rocha & L. A. Rocha, 2003

Species of fish

Emblemaria australis is a species of chaenopsid blenny known from around Brazil, in the southwestern Atlantic ocean. Females of this species can reach a maximum length of 2.7 centimetres (1.1 in) SL.
