= Ekemblemaria lira =

Conservation status
- Data Deficient (IUCN 3.1)

Scientific classification
- Kingdom: Animalia
- Phylum: Chordata
- Class: Actinopterygii
- Order: Blenniiformes
- Family: Chaenopsidae
- Genus: Ekemblemaria
- Species: E. lira

Binomial name
- Ekemblemaria lira Hastings, 1992

Species of fish

Ekemblemaria lira is a species of chaenopsid blenny known from a single specimen from Las Palmas, near Esmeraldas, Ecuador, in the eastern Pacific ocean.
