= Emblemaria walkeri =

Conservation status
- Data Deficient (IUCN 3.1)

Scientific classification
- Kingdom: Animalia
- Phylum: Chordata
- Class: Actinopterygii
- Order: Blenniiformes
- Family: Chaenopsidae
- Genus: Emblemaria
- Species: E. walkeri

Binomial name
- Emblemaria walkeri J. S. Stephens, 1963

Species of fish

Emblemaria walkeri, the elusive signal blenny, is a species of chaenopsid blenny found in the Gulf of California, in the eastern central Pacific ocean. It can reach a maximum length of 6.5 centimetres (2.6 in) TL. This species feeds primarily on zooplankton. The specific name honours fisheries biologist Boyd W. Walker (1917-2001) of the University of California, Los Angeles.
