= Stathmonotus culebrai =

Conservation status
- Least Concern (IUCN 3.1)

Scientific classification
- Kingdom: Animalia
- Phylum: Chordata
- Class: Actinopterygii
- Order: Blenniiformes
- Family: Chaenopsidae
- Genus: Stathmonotus
- Species: S. culebrai

Binomial name
- Stathmonotus culebrai Seale, 1940

Species of fish

Stathmonotus culebrai, the Panamanian worm blenny, is a species of chaenopsid blenny found in rocky reefs around Costa Rica and Panama, in the eastern central Pacific ocean. It can reach a maximum length of 5 centimetres (2.0 in) TL.
