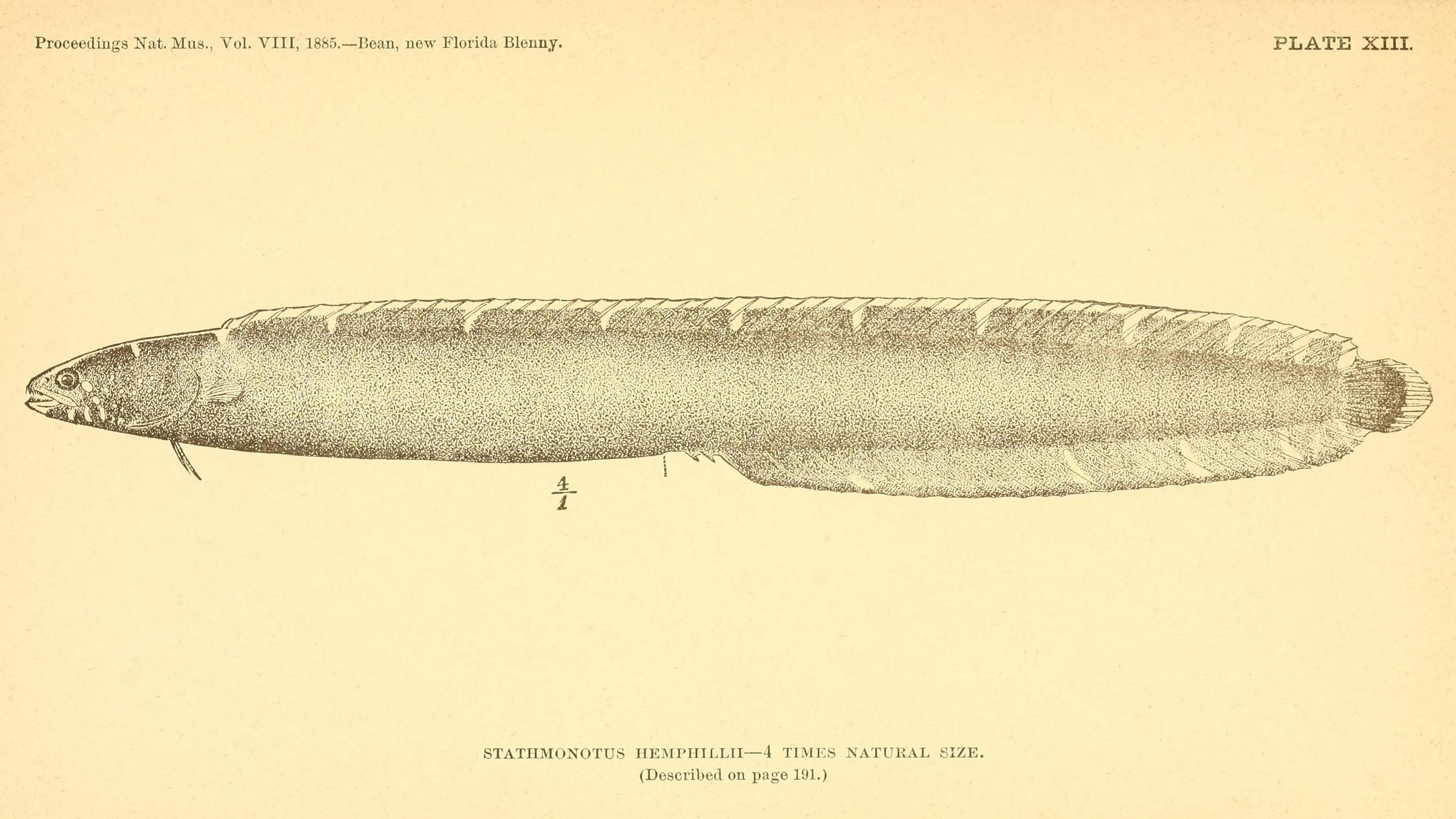

Conservation status
- Least Concern (IUCN 3.1)

Scientific classification
- Kingdom: Animalia
- Phylum: Chordata
- Class: Actinopterygii
- Order: Blenniiformes
- Family: Chaenopsidae
- Genus: Stathmonotus
- Species: S. hemphillii

Binomial name
- Stathmonotus hemphillii T. H. Bean, 1885

Synonyms
- Stathmonotus corallicola Beebe & Tee-Van, 1928

= Stathmonotus hemphillii =

Species of fish

Stathmonotus hemphillii, the blackbelly blenny, is a species of chaenopsid blenny found in coral reefs in the western central Atlantic ocean. It can reach a maximum length of 5 centimetres (2.0 in) TL. This species can also be found in the aquarium trade. The specific name honours the malacologist Henry Hemphill (1830-1914) who collected the type.
