= Emblemariopsis leptocirris =

Conservation status
- Least Concern (IUCN 3.1)

Scientific classification
- Kingdom: Animalia
- Phylum: Chordata
- Class: Actinopterygii
- Order: Blenniiformes
- Family: Chaenopsidae
- Genus: Emblemariopsis
- Species: E. leptocirris

Binomial name
- Emblemariopsis leptocirris J. S. Stephens, 1970

Species of fish

Emblemariopsis leptocirris is a species of chaenopsid blenny found in coral reefs in the western central Atlantic ocean.
