= Stathmonotus tekla =

Conservation status
- Least Concern (IUCN 3.1)

Scientific classification
- Kingdom: Animalia
- Phylum: Chordata
- Class: Actinopterygii
- Order: Blenniiformes
- Family: Chaenopsidae
- Genus: Stathmonotus
- Species: S. tekla

Binomial name
- Stathmonotus tekla Nichols, 1910

Species of fish

Stathmonotus tekla is a species of chaenopsid blenny found in the Caribbean Sea from southern Florida through the West Indies and the coast of Central America to Colombia. It occurs in rubble areas near reefs which are covered by mats of algae and sponges or within beds of finger coral, normally in waters less than 10 metres (33 ft) deep.
