= Chaenopsis schmitti =

Conservation status
- Vulnerable (IUCN 3.1)

Scientific classification
- Kingdom: Animalia
- Phylum: Chordata
- Class: Actinopterygii
- Order: Blenniiformes
- Family: Chaenopsidae
- Genus: Chaenopsis
- Species: C. schmitti

Binomial name
- Chaenopsis schmitti J. E. Böhlke, 1957

Species of fish

Chaenopsis schmitti, the yellow-mouth pikeblenny, is a species of chaenopsid blenny found in coral reefs in the eastern central Pacific ocean. It can reach a maximum length of 8 centimetres (3.1 in) TL. The specific name honours the carcinologist Waldo L. Schmitt (1887–1977) who was Curator of the Division of Marine Invertebrates in the US National Museum and who was responsible for the collection of the two types.
