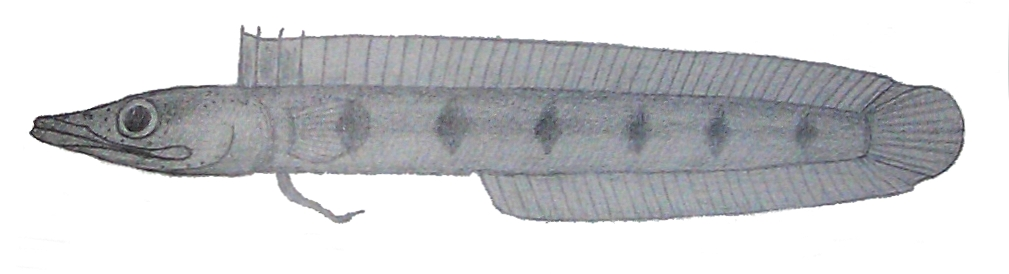

Conservation status
- Data Deficient (IUCN 3.1)

Scientific classification
- Kingdom: Animalia
- Phylum: Chordata
- Class: Actinopterygii
- Order: Blenniiformes
- Family: Chaenopsidae
- Genus: Chaenopsis
- Species: C. stephensi

Binomial name
- Chaenopsis stephensi C. R. Robins & J. E. Randall, 1965

= Chaenopsis stephensi =

Species of fish

Chaenopsis stephensi is a species of chaenopsid blenny found in coral reefs around Venezuela and Yucatan, Mexico, in the western central Atlantic ocean. The specific name honours the environmental biologist John S. Stephens, Jr.
