= Emblemaria biocellata =

Conservation status
- Least Concern (IUCN 3.1)

Scientific classification
- Kingdom: Animalia
- Phylum: Chordata
- Class: Actinopterygii
- Order: Blenniiformes
- Family: Chaenopsidae
- Genus: Emblemaria
- Species: E. biocellata

Binomial name
- Emblemaria biocellata J. S. Stephens, 1970

Species of fish

Emblemaria biocellata, the twospot blenny, is a species of chaenopsid blenny found in coral reefs around Venezuela, French Guiana, and Colombia, in the western Atlantic Ocean. Males of this species can reach a maximum length of 3.8 centimetres (1.5 in) TL, while females can reach a maximum length of 4.1 centimetres (1.6 in) SL.
