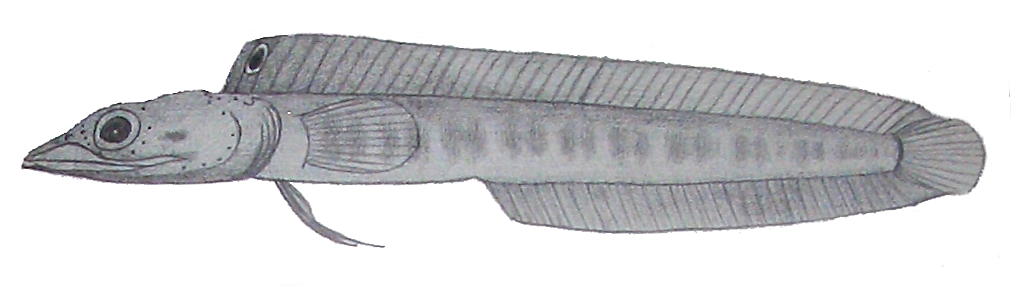

Conservation status
- Data Deficient (IUCN 3.1)

Scientific classification
- Kingdom: Animalia
- Phylum: Chordata
- Class: Actinopterygii
- Order: Blenniiformes
- Family: Chaenopsidae
- Genus: Chaenopsis
- Species: C. megalops

Binomial name
- Chaenopsis megalops Smith-Vaniz, 2000

= Chaenopsis megalops =

Species of fish

Chaenopsis megalops is a species of chaenopsid blenny found around Colombia, in the western central Atlantic Ocean.
