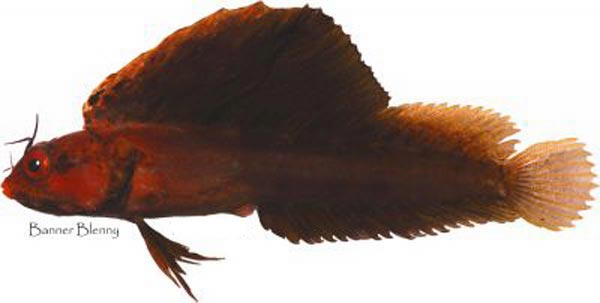

Conservation status
- Least Concern (IUCN 3.1)

Scientific classification
- Kingdom: Animalia
- Phylum: Chordata
- Class: Actinopterygii
- Division: Teleostei
- Order: Blenniiformes
- Family: Chaenopsidae
- Genus: Emblemaria
- Species: E. atlantica

Binomial name
- Emblemaria atlantica D. S. Jordan & Evermann, 1898

Synonyms
- Emblemaria markii Mowbray, 1912

= Emblemaria atlantica =

Species of fish

Emblemaria atlantica, the banner blenny, is a species of marine ray-finned fish belonging to the family Chaenopsidae, which includes the tubeblennies and pikeblennies. This fish is found in the Western Atlantic Ocean.

== Taxonomy ==
Emblemaria atlantica was first formally described in 1898 by the American ichthyologists David Starr Jordan and Barton Warren Evermann with its type locality given as snapper banks off Pensacola, Florida, as part of the stomach contents of a Northern red snapper (Lutjanus campechanus). This species is classified in the genus Emblemaria which was proposed as a monospecific genus in 1883 by Jordan and Charles Henry Gilbert with E. nivipes as its then only species. Emblemaria is classified in the family Chaenopsidae, the pikeblennies or tubeblennies, which belongs to the order Blenniiformes, the blennies.

== Etymology ==
Emblemaria atlantica is classified in the genus Emblemaria, this name suffixes -aria, onto Emblema, which means "flag". This is thought to be an allusion to the high dorsal fin of the type species, E. nivipes. The specific name, atlantica, means "of the Atlantic", although the type locality was in the Gulf of Mexico.

== Description ==
Emblemaria atlantica has an elongate body. It has a rather long and pointed head which lacks spines but there are two ridges along the length of the snout but no bony ridges between the eyes. There is a groove with fleshy folds along its edges which runs on each side of the head from the eye to the dorsal fin, this is more pronounced in mature males and absent in juveniles. Each of these folds has a papilla at its anterior end and there is a single unbranched cirrus above each eye, which is up to 3 times as long as the eye in mature males. There is a single row row of teeth on each side of the front of the roof of the mouth. The dorsal fin has 21 or 22 spines and 14 to 16 soft rays with the middle of the spiny portion being much higher in males. the highest spine being the seventh. The anal fin has 2 spines and between 21 and 23 softs rays, typically 23. The males are dark reddish brown on the head and body with a row of faint rectangular blotches along the sides and pale saddle-like marking along the back. The dorsal fin has diagonal black bars and a dark brown spiny portion, the caudal fin is translucent and the pale to dark brown anal fin has dark spots along its base. The eye and the cirri are barred and the head is mottled. Females are mid-brown with mottling on the anterior body and head with 6 dark edged white bars on the sides and their dorsal fin has oblique spotted bars. This species reaches a maximum total length of 7.5 cm (3.0 in).

== Distribution and habitat ==
Embelmaria atlantica is found in the Western Atlantic Ocean. Its range extends from Bermuda and Georgia, around Florida and into the eastern Gulf of Mexico as far as the Flower Gardens and Galveston, Texas. It is found at depths between 30 and 300 m (100 and 980 ft) and is associated with reefs. In Bermuda this species can be found in the intertidal zone but on the United States coast it prefers deeper waters.
