= Emblemariopsis bottomei =

Conservation status
- Least Concern (IUCN 3.1)

Scientific classification
- Kingdom: Animalia
- Phylum: Chordata
- Class: Actinopterygii
- Division: Teleostei
- Order: Blenniiformes
- Family: Chaenopsidae
- Genus: Emblemariopsis
- Species: E. bottomei

Binomial name
- Emblemariopsis bottomei J. S. Stephens, 1961

Species of fish

Emblemariopsis bottomei, the shorthead blenny or the midnight blenny, is a species of chaenopsid blenny found in coral reefs in the western central Atlantic Ocean. It can reach a maximum length of 3 centimetres (1.2 in) SL. The specific name honours Peter Bottome, although who this is is not specified, but it may possibly be the Venezuelan businessman Peter Bottome Deery (1937-2016).
