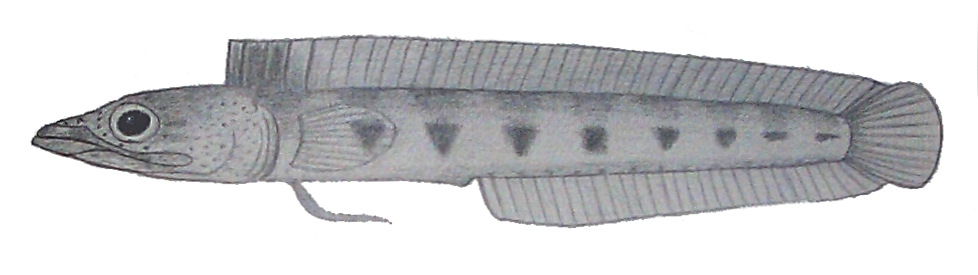

Conservation status
- Least Concern (IUCN 3.1)

Scientific classification
- Kingdom: Animalia
- Phylum: Chordata
- Class: Actinopterygii
- Order: Blenniiformes
- Family: Chaenopsidae
- Genus: Chaenopsis
- Species: C. roseola

Binomial name
- Chaenopsis roseola Hastings & Shipp, 1981

= Chaenopsis roseola =

Species of fish

Chaenopsis roseola, the flecked pikeblenny, is a species of chaenopsid blenny found around the United States in the western Atlantic ocean. It can reach a maximum length of 4.2 centimetres (1.7 in) SL.
