= Coralliozetus angelicus =

Conservation status
- Least Concern (IUCN 3.1)

Scientific classification
- Kingdom: Animalia
- Phylum: Chordata
- Class: Actinopterygii
- Order: Blenniiformes
- Family: Chaenopsidae
- Genus: Coralliozetus
- Species: C. angelicus

Binomial name
- Coralliozetus angelicus (J. E. Böhlke & Mead, 1957)

Synonyms
- Emblemaria angelica Böhlke & Mead, 1957

Species of fish

Coralliozetus angelicus, the angel blenny, is a species of chaenopsid blenny found in coral reefs from the Gulf of California to Acapulco, Mexico, in the eastern central Pacific ocean. It can reach a maximum length of 3.5 centimetres (1.4 in) TL. This species feeds primarily on zooplankton.
