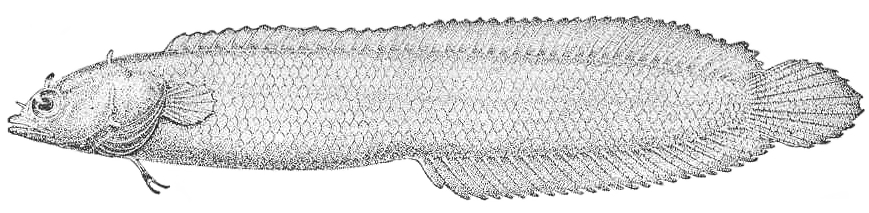
- Stathmonotus stahli

Scientific classification
- Kingdom: Animalia
- Phylum: Chordata
- Class: Actinopterygii
- Order: Blenniiformes
- Family: Chaenopsidae
- Genus: Stathmonotus; T. H. Bean, 1885

Type species
- Stathmonotus hemphillii T. H. Bean, 1885

= Stathmonotus =

Genus of fishes

Stathmonotus is a genus of chaenopsid blennies found in the Pacific and Atlantic oceans.

== Species ==
There are currently seven recognized species in this genus:

- Stathmonotus culebrai Seale, 1940 (Panamanian worm blenny)
- Stathmonotus gymnodermis V. G. Springer, 1955 (Naked blenny)
- Stathmonotus hemphillii T. H. Bean, 1885 (Blackbelly blenny)
- Stathmonotus lugubris J. E. Böhlke, 1953 (Mexican worm blenny)
- Stathmonotus sinuscalifornici (Chabanaud, 1942) (California worm blenny)
- Stathmonotus stahli (Evermann & M. C. Marsh, 1899) (Eelgrass blenny)
- Stathmonotus tekla Nichols, 1910
