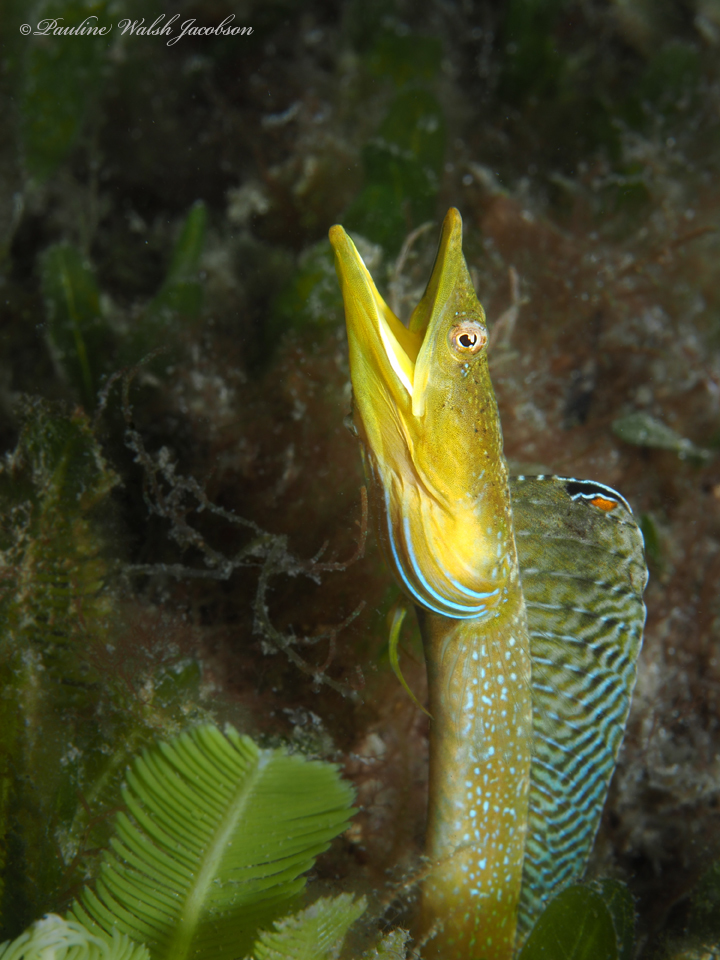

Conservation status
- Least Concern (IUCN 3.1)

Scientific classification
- Kingdom: Animalia
- Phylum: Chordata
- Class: Actinopterygii
- Order: Blenniiformes
- Family: Chaenopsidae
- Genus: Chaenopsis
- Species: C. ocellata

Binomial name
- Chaenopsis ocellata Poey, 1865

= Chaenopsis ocellata =

Species of fish

Chaenopsis ocellata, the bluethroat pikeblenny, is a species of chaenopsid blenny found in coral reefs in the western Atlantic ocean. It can reach a maximum length of 12.5 centimetres (4.9 in) TL. It can also be found in the commercial aquarium trade.

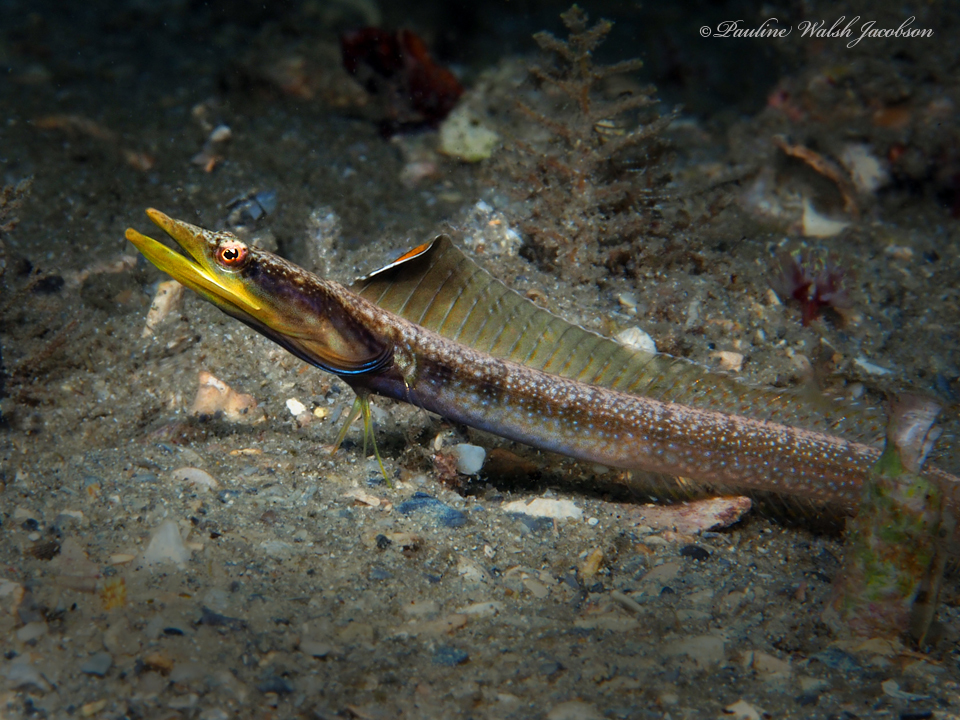
In Florida.

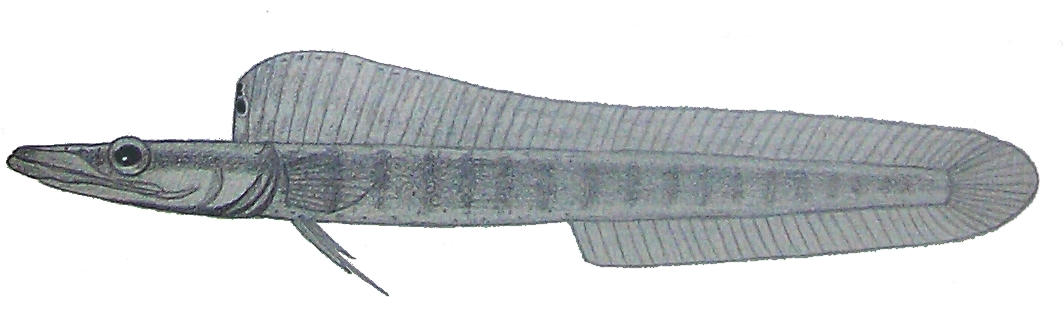
Illustration
