= Emblemariopsis pricei =

Conservation status
- Vulnerable (IUCN 3.1)

Scientific classification
- Kingdom: Animalia
- Phylum: Chordata
- Class: Actinopterygii
- Division: Teleostei
- Order: Blenniiformes
- Family: Chaenopsidae
- Genus: Emblemariopsis
- Species: E. pricei

Binomial name
- Emblemariopsis pricei D. W. Greenfield, 1975

Species of fish

Emblemariopsis pricei, the seafan blenny, is a species of chaenopsid blenny found in Glover's Reef, on the coasts of Belize and Honduras, in the western Atlantic ocean. It can reach a maximum length of 2.9 centimetres (1.1 in) SL. The specific name honours the premier of Belize at the time Greenfield was give permission to collect specimens in Bleize, George C. Price (1919-2011).
