= Emblemariopsis ramirezi =

Conservation status
- Least Concern (IUCN 3.1)

Scientific classification
- Kingdom: Animalia
- Phylum: Chordata
- Class: Actinopterygii
- Order: Blenniiformes
- Family: Chaenopsidae
- Genus: Emblemariopsis
- Species: E. ramirezi

Binomial name
- Emblemariopsis ramirezi (Cervigón, 1999)

Synonyms
- Coralliozetus ramirezi Cervigón, 1999

Species of fish

Emblemariopsis ramirezi is a species of chaenopsid blenny known from Venezuela, in the western central Atlantic ocean. The specific name honours Humberto Ramirez, who found this species and drew Cervigón's attention to it.
