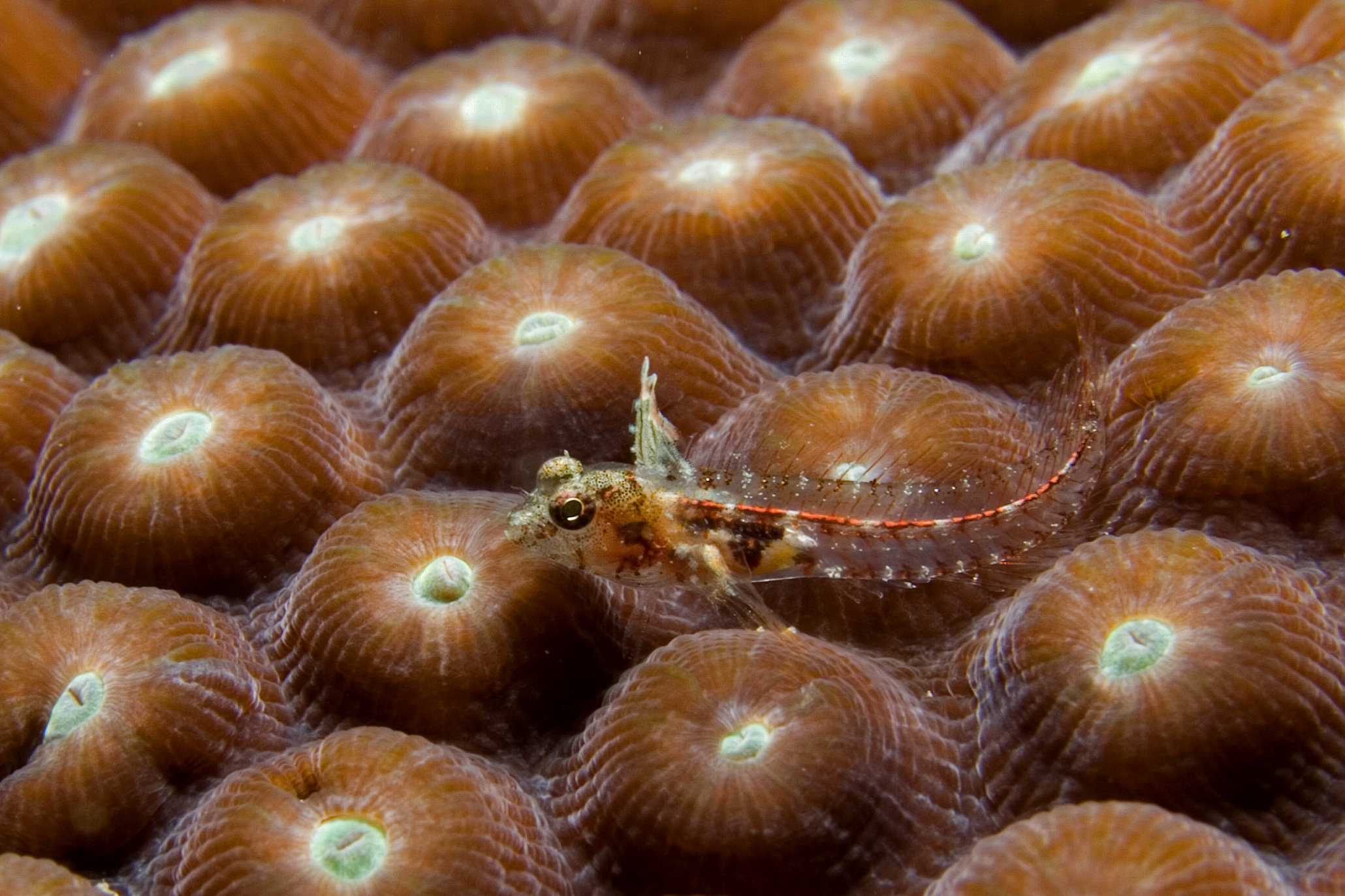

Conservation status
- Least Concern (IUCN 3.1)

Scientific classification
- Kingdom: Animalia
- Phylum: Chordata
- Class: Actinopterygii
- Order: Blenniiformes
- Family: Chaenopsidae
- Genus: Emblemariopsis
- Species: E. carib

Binomial name
- Emblemariopsis carib Victor, 2010

= Caribbean flagfin blenny =

Species of fish

The Caribbean flagfin blenny (Emblemariopsis carib) is a species of chaenopsid blenny known from tropical reefs in Puerto Rico and the Virgin Islands, in the Caribbean Sea. This species reaches a length of 1.5 centimetres (0.59 in) SL.

== Etymology ==
The species epithet refers to the Carib people of the Antilles.
