= Emblemariopsis dianae =

Conservation status
- Data Deficient (IUCN 3.1)

Scientific classification
- Kingdom: Animalia
- Phylum: Chordata
- Class: Actinopterygii
- Order: Blenniiformes
- Family: Chaenopsidae
- Genus: Emblemariopsis
- Species: E. dianae

Binomial name
- Emblemariopsis dianae J. C. Tyler & Hastings, 2004

Species of fish

Emblemariopsis dianae, the orangeflag blenny, is a species of chaenopsid blenny found in coral reefs around Belize, in the western central Atlantic ocean. It can reach a maximum length of 2.1 centimetres (0.83 in) fish measurement. The specific name honours Diane M. Tyler, a researcher into the behavioural ecology of blennies in the family Chaenopsidae and the wife of James Chase Tyler.
