= Emblemaria caldwelli =

Conservation status
- Least Concern (IUCN 3.1)

Scientific classification
- Kingdom: Animalia
- Phylum: Chordata
- Class: Actinopterygii
- Order: Blenniiformes
- Family: Chaenopsidae
- Genus: Emblemaria
- Species: E. caldwelli

Binomial name
- Emblemaria caldwelli J. S. Stephens, 1970

Species of fish

Emblemaria caldwelli, the Caribbean blenny, is a species of chaenopsid blenny found in coral reefs around the Bahamas, Belize, Honduras and Jamaica, in the western central Atlantic ocean. The specific name honours David K. Caldwell, Director of Marineland Research Laboratory, St. Augustine, Florida in gratitude for the loan of specimens.
