= Emblemaria caycedoi =

Conservation status
- Least Concern (IUCN 3.1)

Scientific classification
- Kingdom: Animalia
- Phylum: Chordata
- Class: Actinopterygii
- Division: Teleostei
- Order: Blenniiformes
- Family: Chaenopsidae
- Genus: Emblemaria
- Species: E. caycedoi

Binomial name
- Emblemaria caycedoi Acero P., 1984

Species of fish

Emblemaria caycedoi, the Colombian blenny, is a species of chaenopsid blenny found around Venezuela and Isla de Providencia, Colombia, in the western central Atlantic Ocean. The specific name honours the young marine biologist Enrique Caycedo Lara, who died in 1978.
