= Tayrona blenny =

Conservation status
- Least Concern (IUCN 3.1)

Scientific classification
- Kingdom: Animalia
- Phylum: Chordata
- Class: Actinopterygii
- Order: Blenniiformes
- Family: Chaenopsidae
- Genus: Emblemariopsis
- Species: E. tayrona

Binomial name
- Emblemariopsis tayrona (Acero P., 1987)

Synonyms
- Coralliozetus tayrona Acero P., 1987

Species of fish

The Tayrona blenny (Emblemariopsis tayrona) is a species of chaenopsid blenny endemic to the Atlantic waters off of Santa Marta, Colombia.
