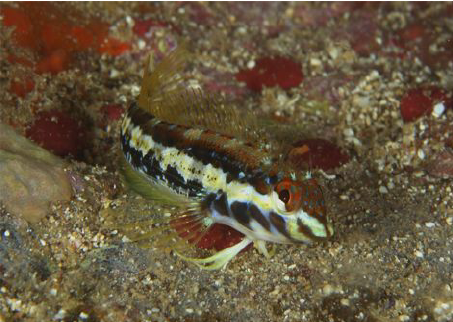

Conservation status
- Least Concern (IUCN 3.1)

Scientific classification
- Kingdom: Animalia
- Phylum: Chordata
- Class: Actinopterygii
- Order: Blenniiformes
- Family: Chaenopsidae
- Genus: Emblemariopsis
- Species: E. signifer

Binomial name
- Emblemariopsis signifer (Ginsburg, 1942)

Synonyms
- Emblemaria signifer Ginsburg, 1942

= Emblemariopsis signifer =

Species of fish

Emblemariopsis signifer is a species of chaenopsid blenny found in coral reefs in the western Atlantic ocean. It can reach a maximum length of 2.8 centimetres (1.1 in) SL. This species is preyed on by Horse-eye jacks.
