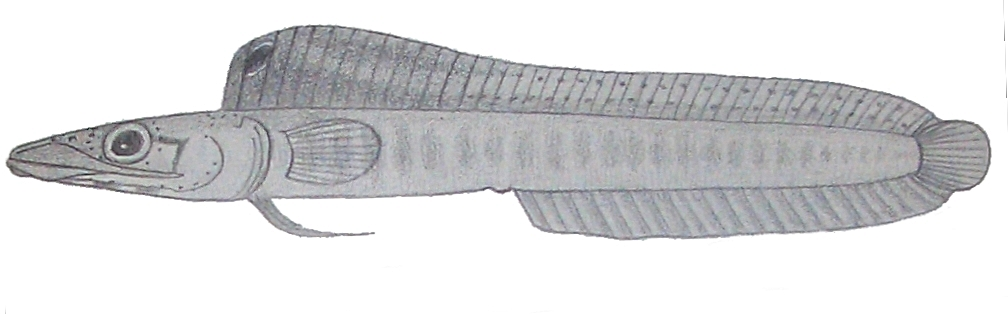

Conservation status
- Least Concern (IUCN 3.1)

Scientific classification
- Kingdom: Animalia
- Phylum: Chordata
- Class: Actinopterygii
- Order: Blenniiformes
- Family: Chaenopsidae
- Genus: Chaenopsis
- Species: C. resh

Binomial name
- Chaenopsis resh C. R. Robins & J. E. Randall, 1965

= Chaenopsis resh =

Species of fish

Chaenopsis resh is a species of chaenopsid blenny found in coral reefs around Venezuela and Colombia, in the western central Atlantic Ocean. It can reach a maximum length of 13 centimetres (5.1 in) TL.
