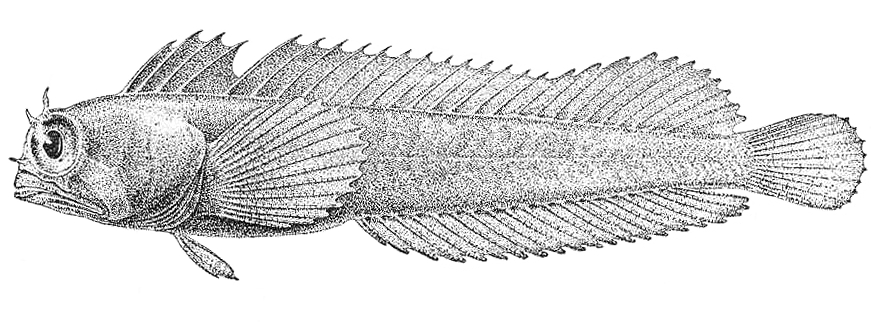
- Coralliozetus cardonae

Scientific classification
- Kingdom: Animalia
- Phylum: Chordata
- Class: Actinopterygii
- Order: Blenniiformes
- Family: Chaenopsidae
- Genus: Coralliozetus; Evermann & M. C. Marsh, 1899

Type species
- Coralliozetus cardonae Evermann & M. C. Marsh, 1899

= Coralliozetus =

Genus of fishes

Coralliozetus is a genus of chaenopsid blennies mostly found in the eastern Pacific Ocean with one species (C. cardonae) occurring in the western Atlantic Ocean. Additionally, one species (C. clausus) is endemic to Cocos Island, Costa Rica.

== Species ==
There are currently seven recognized species in this genus:

- Coralliozetus angelicus (J. E. Böhlke & Mead, 1957) (Angel blenny)
- Coralliozetus boehlkei J. S. Stephens, 1963 (Barcheek blenny)
- Coralliozetus cardonae Evermann & M. C. Marsh, 1899 (Twinhorn blenny)
- Coralliozetus clausus Hastings, 2021
- Coralliozetus micropes (Beebe & Tee-Van, 1938) (Scarletfin blenny)
- Coralliozetus rosenblatti J. S. Stephens, 1963 (Spikefin blenny)
- Coralliozetus springeri J. S. Stephens & R. K. Johnson, 1966
