= Emblemaria vitta =

Conservation status
- Least Concern (IUCN 3.1)

Scientific classification
- Kingdom: Animalia
- Phylum: Chordata
- Class: Actinopterygii
- Order: Blenniiformes
- Family: Chaenopsidae
- Genus: Emblemaria
- Species: E. vitta

Binomial name
- Emblemaria vitta J. T. Williams, 2002

Species of fish

Emblemaria vitta, the ribbon blenny, is a species of chaenopsid blenny found around Navassa Island, in the western central Atlantic ocean. It is known to reach a length of 1.8 centimetres (0.71 in) SL.

== Etymology ==
The species name "vitta" (meaning "band" in Latin) references the ribbon shape of the blenny's orbital cirri.
