= Emblemaria piratula =

Conservation status
- Least Concern (IUCN 3.1)

Scientific classification
- Kingdom: Animalia
- Phylum: Chordata
- Class: Actinopterygii
- Order: Blenniiformes
- Family: Chaenopsidae
- Genus: Emblemaria
- Species: E. piratula

Binomial name
- Emblemaria piratula Ginsburg & Reid, 1942

Species of fish

Emblemaria piratula, the pirate blenny, is a species of chaenopsid blenny found in coral reefs in the western central Atlantic ocean. It can reach a maximum length of 5 centimetres (2.0 in) TL. It is also found in the aquarium trade.
