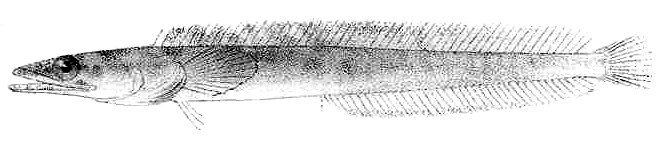

Conservation status
- Least Concern (IUCN 3.1)

Scientific classification
- Kingdom: Animalia
- Phylum: Chordata
- Class: Actinopterygii
- Order: Blenniiformes
- Family: Chaenopsidae
- Genus: Chaenopsis
- Species: C. alepidote

Binomial name
- Chaenopsis alepidote (Gilbert, 1890)

Synonyms
- Lucioblennius alepidotus Gilbert, 1890; Lucioblennius lucius Osburn & Nichols, 1916; Chaenopsis alepidota californiensis Böhlke, 1957

= Chaenopsis alepidota =

Species of fish

Chaenopsis alepidota, the orangethroat pikeblenny, is a species of chaenopsid blenny found in the eastern Pacific Ocean from California to the Gulf of California. It lives in holes excavated by worms in sandy areas. Some notable distinguishing physical characteristics of the species within the Chaenopsis family are the number of dark lateral blotches and the main body color. The Chaenopsis alepidota species in particular has 11 blotches and has a pale and light green main body color.

A subspecies of the orangethroat pikeblenny has been described, Chaenopsis alepidota californiensis Böhlke, 1957, but it is generally given as a synonym of this species.
