= Emblemaria hypacanthus =

Conservation status
- Least Concern (IUCN 3.1)

Scientific classification
- Kingdom: Animalia
- Phylum: Chordata
- Class: Actinopterygii
- Order: Blenniiformes
- Family: Chaenopsidae
- Genus: Emblemaria
- Species: E. hypacanthus

Binomial name
- Emblemaria hypacanthus (O. P. Jenkins & Evermann, 1889)

Synonyms
- Psednoblennius hypacanthus Jenkins & Evermann, 1889; Emblemaria oculocirris (D. S. Jordan, 1897)

Species of fish

Emblemaria hypacanthus, the Gulf signal blenny, is a species of chaenopsid blenny known from the Gulf of California, in the eastern central Pacific ocean. It can reach a maximum length of 5 centimetres (2.0 in) TL. This species feeds primarily on zooplankton.
