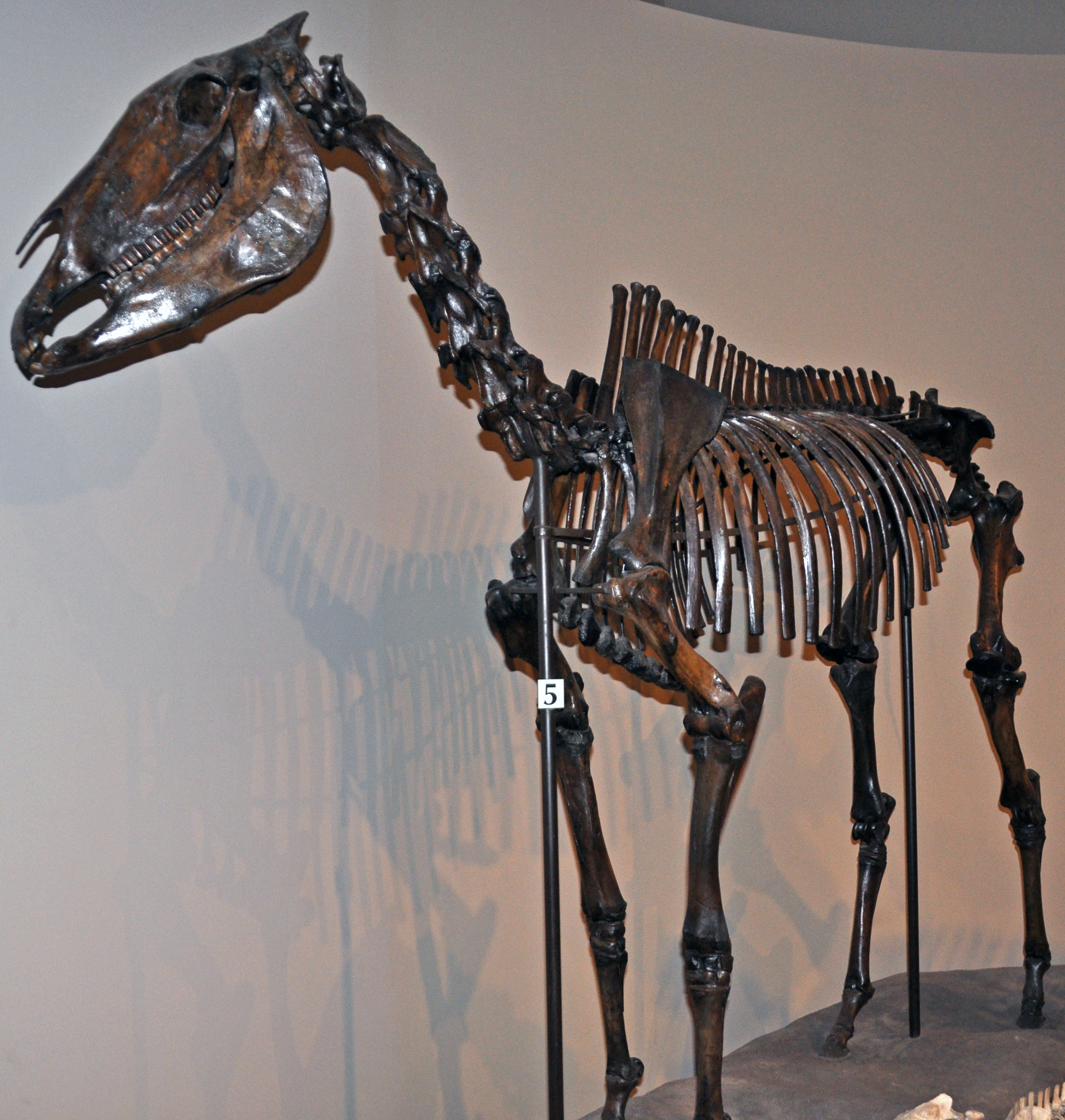
- Skeleton in Carnegie Museum of Natural History

Scientific classification
- Kingdom: Animalia
- Phylum: Chordata
- Class: Mammalia
- Order: Perissodactyla
- Family: Equidae
- Genus: Equus
- Species: †E. occidentalis

Binomial name
- †Equus occidentalis Leidy, 1865

= Equus occidentalis =

Equus occidentalis Temporal range: Pleistocene

Extinct species of horse

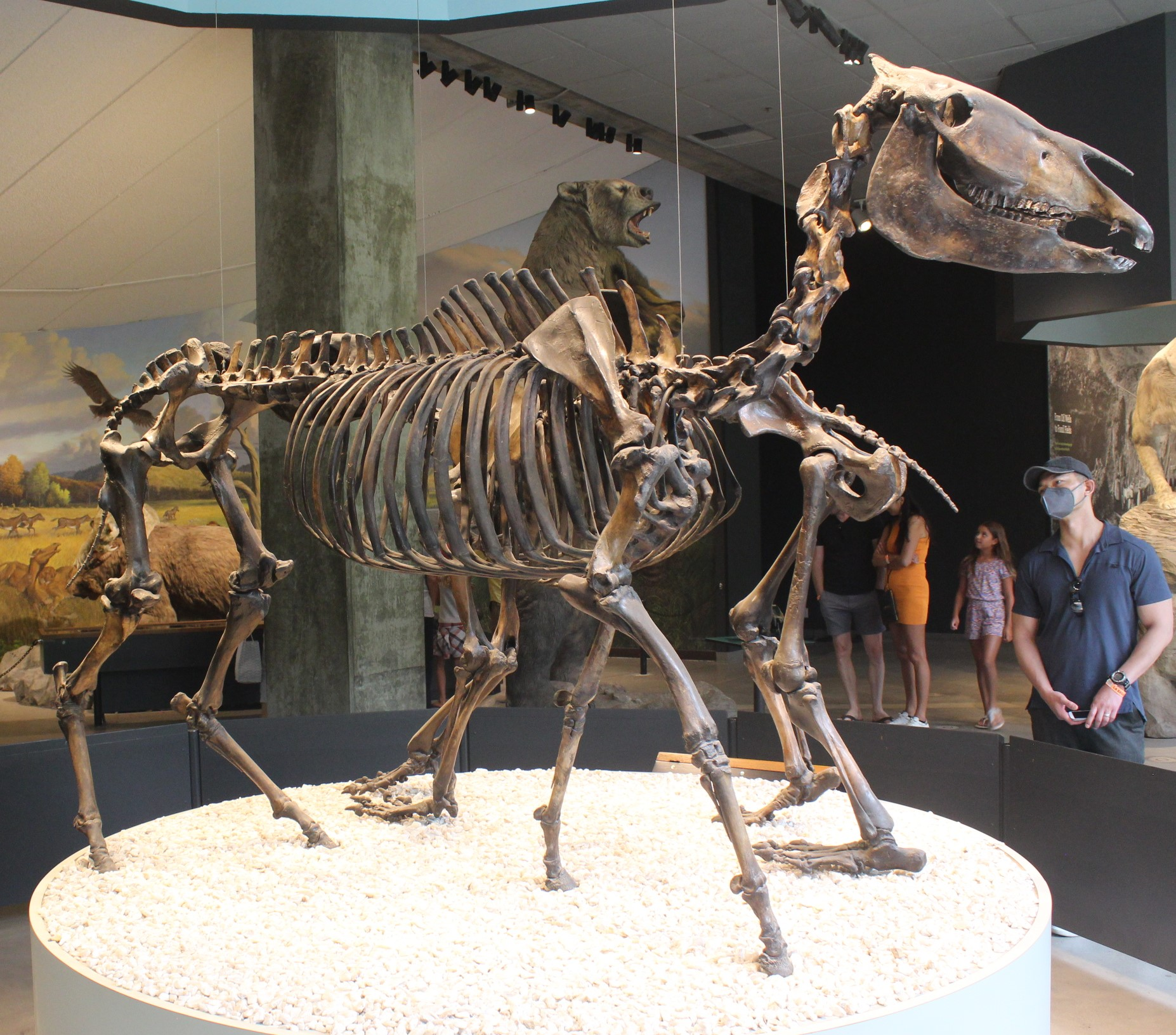
Skeleton from the La Brea Tar Pits

Equus occidentalis (commonly known as the western horse) is an extinct species of wild horse that once inhabited North America, specifically the Southwestern United States, during the Pleistocene epoch. Some researchers to consider it a nomen dubium, as it was first described from three teeth with insufficient diagnostic characters, one even being suggested to be a separate taxon related to the American zebra. This taxonomic debate is yet to be fully resolved.

== Discovery and naming ==
Equus occidentalis was described in 1865 by American paleontologist Joseph Leidy on the basis of three teeth from separate localities in California. This included a left premolar three that was unearthed in a layer of auriferous clay in Tuolumne County, while a right premolar three and molar three from an asphalt seep near Buena Vista Lake in Kern County. Leidy did not designate a holotype (name-bearing) specimen, however the premolar from Tuolumne County was later chosen as the lectotype (a type specimen chosen after a species is named). In 1869, Leidy stated that E. occidentalis was a synonym (the same taxon as) of E. excelsus, a species named based on middle Pleistocene-aged teeth from Nebraska. Later studies by American paleontologists Edward Drinker Cope and James Williams Gidley argued that they were different species.

== Description ==
E. occidentalis was about the same size as the modern Arabian horse, measuring up to 1.47 metres (4.8 ft) in shoulder height. It was morphologically and proportionally similar to the modern day zebra.
