= Emblemaria culmenis =

Conservation status
- Data Deficient (IUCN 3.1)

Scientific classification
- Kingdom: Animalia
- Phylum: Chordata
- Class: Actinopterygii
- Order: Blenniiformes
- Family: Chaenopsidae
- Genus: Emblemaria
- Species: E. culmenis

Binomial name
- Emblemaria culmenis J. S. Stephens, 1970

Species of fish

Emblemaria culmenis, the ridge blenny, is a species of chaenopsid blenny known from a single specimen collected in Venezuela, in the western central Atlantic ocean. It is known to reach a length of 5.1 centimetres (2.0 in) SL.
