= Emblemaria piratica =

Conservation status
- Least Concern (IUCN 3.1)

Scientific classification
- Kingdom: Animalia
- Phylum: Chordata
- Class: Actinopterygii
- Order: Blenniiformes
- Family: Chaenopsidae
- Genus: Emblemaria
- Species: E. piratica

Binomial name
- Emblemaria piratica Ginsburg, 1942

Species of fish

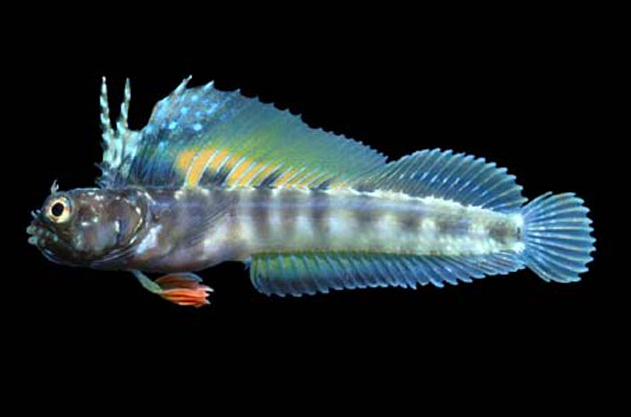
Image: Emblemaria piratica (male) by Gerald R. Allen.

The sailfin signal blenny (Emblemaria piratica) is a species of tube-dwelling blenny part of the family Chaenopsidae found in the eastern Pacific Ocean extending from southern Mexico to Panama. Due to their name as tube blennies, members of the family commonly forage on small benthic invertebrates such as barnacles, mollusks, zooplankton and polychaete tube worms. The species is known for its large prominent spiny dorsal fin and sexual dimorphism found between both genders. Notably sexual dimorphism is common across the family Chaenopsidae with varying degrees of variation that is used in territorial and courtship displays.

== Taxonomy ==
Emblemaria piratica was first described by Isaac Ginsburg and published in the Journal of the Washington Academy of Sciences in 1942 belonging to the order Bleniiformes which includes families of small ray-finned fishes inhabiting coastal benthic habitats. Specifically, the sailfin signal blenny is part of the family Chaenopsidae which are tube blennies that have long compressed bodies found throughout tropical waters across North and South America. The family includes Its genus Emblemaria contains various species of chaenopsid blennies that display strong sexual dimorphisms and unique characteristics in their social and reproductive behavior.

== Species description ==
The sailfin signal blenny is best described as a small reef fish with a compressed body plan allowing it for high maneuverability in coral reefs and crevices. The most striking feature of this species is a long sail-like dorsal fin with three spines extending highly while the next few spines are considerably shorter than the first three. The spines start gradually decreasing as you go along its dorsal fin. Its most distinctive feature that separates it from other members of its family are its well developed bony tubercles on its upper snout. Male sailfin signal blennies have a bright dynamic coloration similar in other members of the genus Emblemaria which is used in mating and territorial displays. Females typically are smaller in size and exhibit a duller and cryptic coloration which allows them to camouflage with the reef substrate.

== Distribution ==
Emblemaria piratica is commonly found across all of Central America including countries such as Costa Rica, El Salvador, Guatemala, Honduras, Nicaragua, Panama, and parts of Southern Mexico. It mainly occupies shallow waters and coral reefs often residing in abandoned worm tubes and small crevices for protection and shelter. In regards to depth, the species can be from 5m-30m. These microhabitats play a crucial role in its development and life history shaping its ecological interactions.

== Biology & Life History ==
Image: Emblemaria piratica♂(left) & Emblemaria piratica♀(right) by Estape Carlos & Allison

Within the family Chaenopsidae, the sailfin signal blenny start their journey as larval eggs deposited by one or more females in shelter cavities which are guarded by breeding males. Once they hatch, they have a planktonic larval stage that disperses from the reef before inhabiting suitable microhabitats such as abandoned worm tubes, crevices, and cross rubble fragments as adults. Their success in selecting microhabitats are dictated by strong environmental interactions such as niche availability, competition, and predator pressure influencing their overall survival and reproduction. As adults, males are highly territorial, displaying flagging behavior through the use of their prominent dorsal fin to signal dominance and deter any nearby males from encroaching. The elongated dorsal of a male signal blenny is crucial towards survival and success often indicating health and fitness which plays a key role in mate selection. In contrast, juvenile and female blennes are cryptically colored which helps them avoid predation and forage on small benthic invertebrates aiding their growth and survival. Additionally, competition for these microhabitats is a significant ecological factor for members of this species and against other ray-finned species who compete intensely for small cavities and abandoned worm tubes which serve an essential part of their history as shelter and breeding sites.

== Conservation Status ==
Currently, the population trends are unknown for this species and have not yet been fully evaluated by any official organization. As a result, no official data found in academic literature in recent years has referenced a number or sample and no organization has conducted in-depth population studies on the species. However it is estimated by the IUCN that the population of the Emblemaria piratica is of least concern due to no current indication of population decline and lack of major threats due to the species having a widespread range across the Eastern Pacific. Due to the species reliance on coral reefs, it can be suggested that threats to reef ecosystems stemming from anthropogenic activities such as coral bleaching, pollution, and human development across the coast could indirectly impact population numbers in the future. In regards to conservation efforts, coral reef protection is common across the areas that the species resides and continued monitoring of reef health may be important in assessing and reducing its risks from population decline.
