= Emblemaria hudsoni =

Conservation status
- Least Concern (IUCN 3.1)

Scientific classification
- Kingdom: Animalia
- Phylum: Chordata
- Class: Actinopterygii
- Order: Blenniiformes
- Family: Chaenopsidae
- Genus: Emblemaria
- Species: E. hudsoni

Binomial name
- Emblemaria hudsoni Evermann & Radcliffe, 1917

Synonyms
- Emblemaria tortugae (Hildebrand, 1946)

Species of fish

Emblemaria hudsoni is a species of chaenopsid blenny found around Peru, in the southeast Pacific ocean. It can reach a maximum length of 7.4 centimetres (2.9 in) TL. The specific name honours the Captain Charles Bradford Hudson (1865-1939) of the District of Columbia National Guard, who was an illustrator and who painted many species of American fishes.
