= Wrasse (disambiguation) =

Wrasses are a family, Labridae, of brightly coloured marine fish.

Wrasse may also refer to:

- Wrasse Records, a British record label
- Wrasse blenny, Hemiemblemaria simulus, a species of fish
