= Mccoskerichthys sandae =

Conservation status
- Near Threatened (IUCN 3.1)

Scientific classification
- Kingdom: Animalia
- Phylum: Chordata
- Class: Actinopterygii
- Order: Blenniiformes
- Family: Chaenopsidae
- Genus: Mccoskerichthys
- Species: M. sandae

Binomial name
- Mccoskerichthys sandae Rosenblatt & J. S. Stephens, 1978

Species of fish

Mccoskerichthys sandae, the tufted blenny, is a species of chaenopsid blenny, found around Costa Rica and Panama, in the eastern central Pacific ocean. It can reach a maximum length of 8 centimetres (3.1 in) TL. This species feeds primarily on small crustaceans including copepods, amphipods, and ostracods. It is the only known member of its genus. The generic name honours the zoologist John E. McCosker, who discovered this blenny and who assisted in the collection of the type and the specific name honours his then wife, Sandra.
