= Emblemaria nivipes =

Conservation status
- Data Deficient (IUCN 3.1)

Scientific classification
- Kingdom: Animalia
- Phylum: Chordata
- Class: Actinopterygii
- Order: Blenniiformes
- Family: Chaenopsidae
- Genus: Emblemaria
- Species: E. nivipes

Binomial name
- Emblemaria nivipes D. S. Jordan & C. H. Gilbert, 1883

Synonyms
- Emblemaria guttata (Ginsburg, 1942)

Species of fish

Emblemaria nivipes, the whiteback signal blenny, is a species of chaenopsid blenny found around Costa Rica and Colombia, in the eastern central Pacific Ocean. It can reach a maximum length of 4.2 centimetres (1.7 in) SL. This species feeds primarily on zooplankton.
