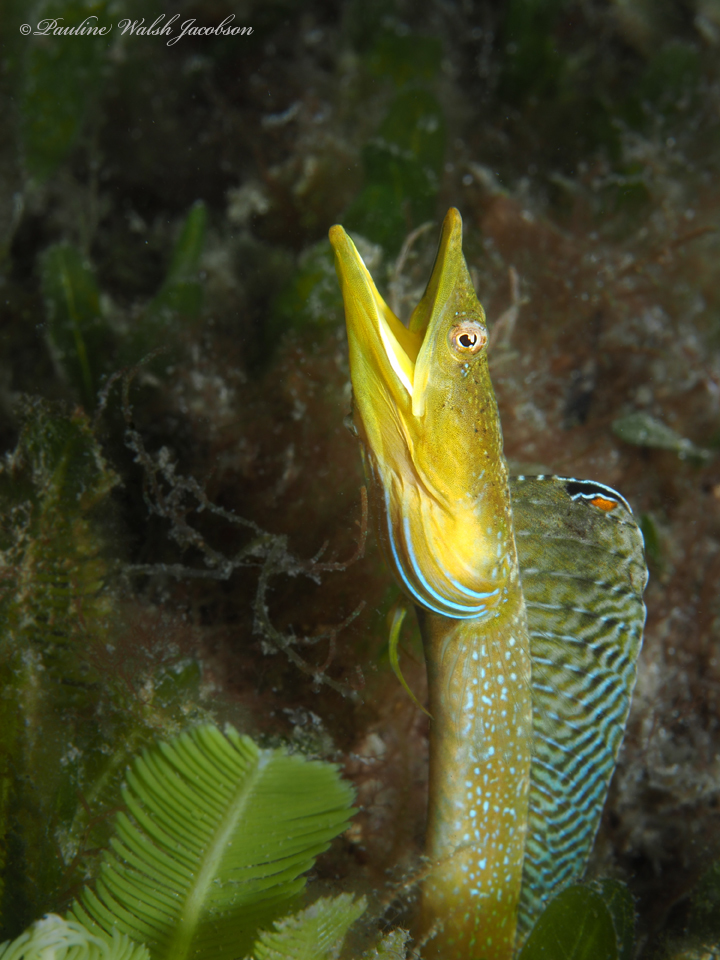
- Chaenopsis ocellata

Scientific classification
- Kingdom: Animalia
- Phylum: Chordata
- Class: Actinopterygii
- Order: Blenniiformes
- Family: Chaenopsidae
- Genus: Chaenopsis; T. N. Gill, 1865

Type species
- Chaenopsis ocellatus Poey, 1865

= Chaenopsis =

Genus of fishes

Chaenopsis is a genus of pikeblennies found in the Pacific and Atlantic oceans.

== Species ==
There are currently 11 recognized species in this genus:

- Chaenopsis alepidota (C. H. Gilbert, 1890) (Orangethroat pikeblenny)
- Chaenopsis celeste Tavera, 2021 (Celeste's pikeblenny)
- Chaenopsis coheni J. E. Böhlke, 1957 (Cortez pikeblenny)
- Chaenopsis deltarrhis J. E. Böhlke, 1957 (Delta pikeblenny)
- Chaenopsis limbaughi C. R. Robins & J. E. Randall, 1965 (Yellowface pikeblenny)
- Chaenopsis megalops Smith-Vaniz, 2000
- Chaenopsis ocellata Poey, 1865 (Bluethroat pikeblenny)
- Chaenopsis resh C. R. Robins & J. E. Randall, 1965
- Chaenopsis roseola Hastings & Shipp, 1981 (Flecked pikeblenny)
- Chaenopsis schmitti J. E. Böhlke, 1957 (Yellow-mouth pikeblenny)
- Chaenopsis stephensi C. R. Robins & J. E. Randall, 1965

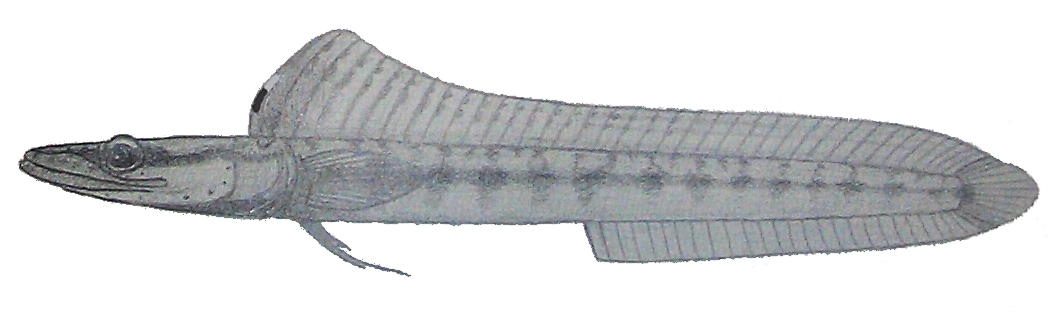
C. limbaughi

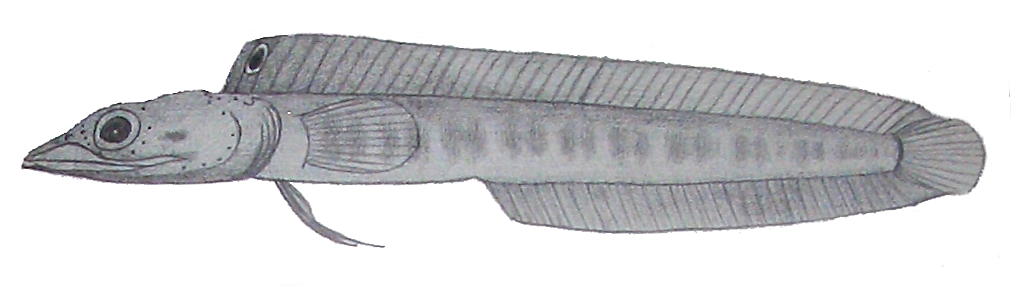
C. megalops

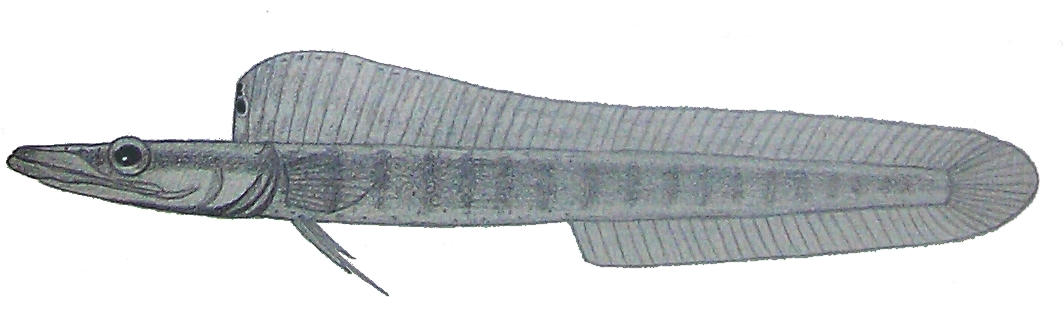
C. ocellata

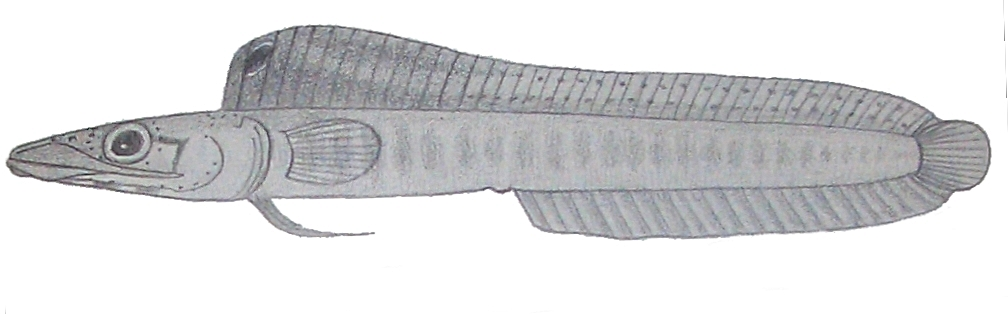
C. resh

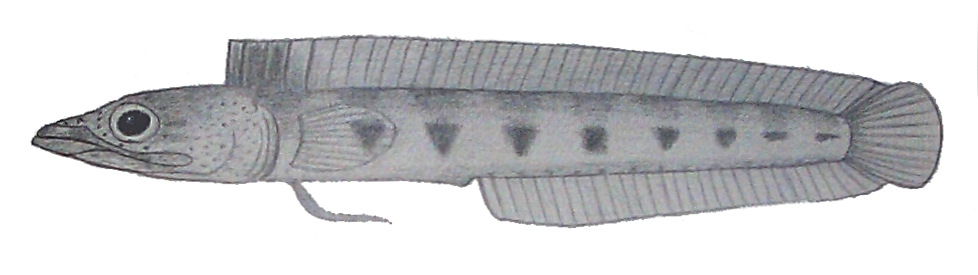
C. roseola

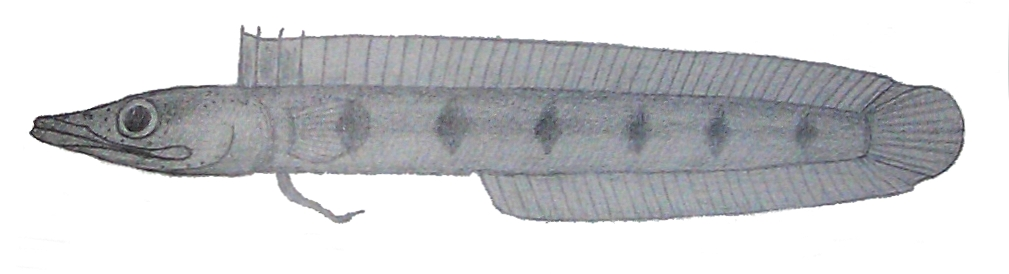
C. stephensi
