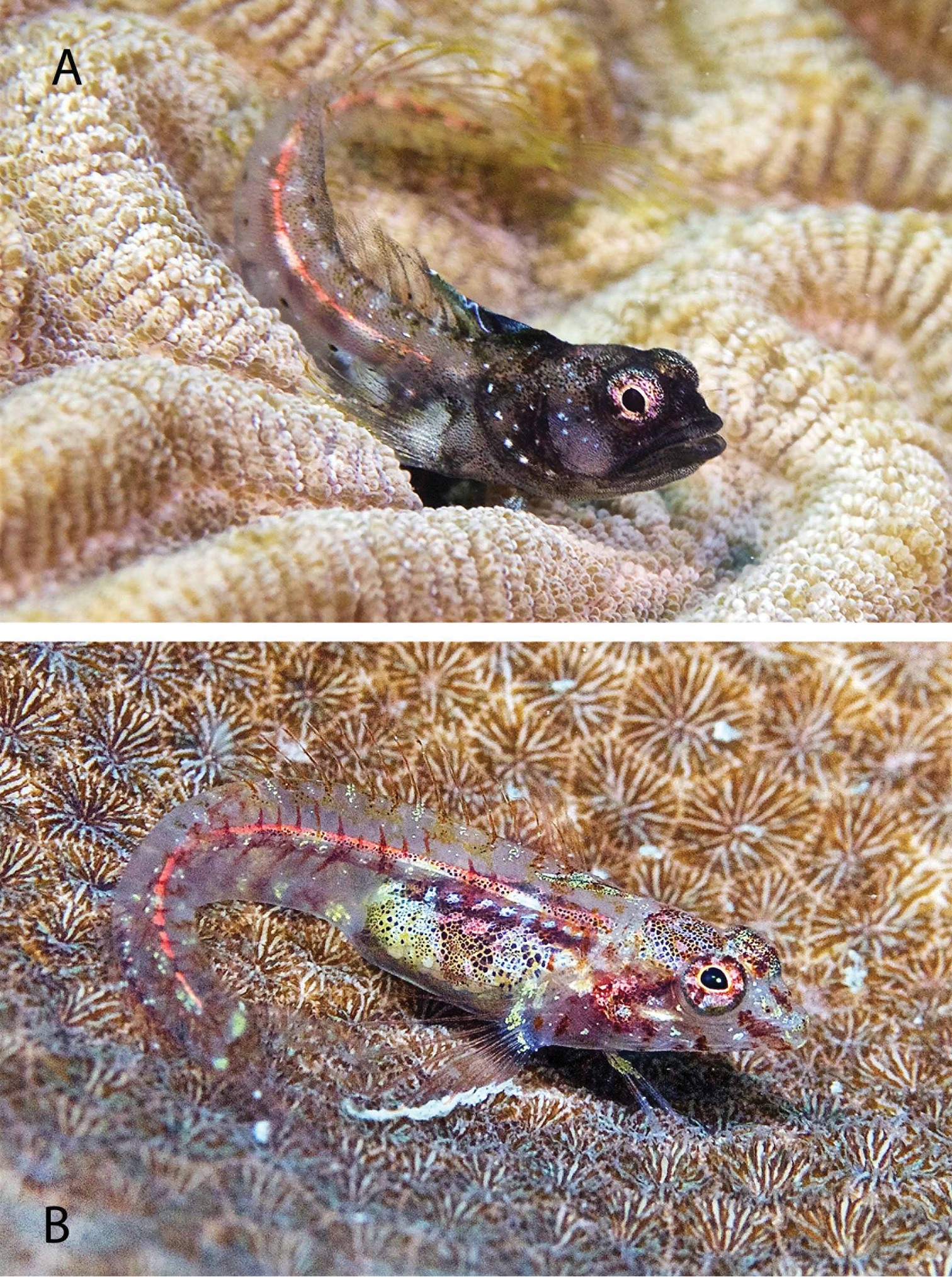
- A: male, B: female or immature male.

Conservation status
- Least Concern (IUCN 3.1)

Scientific classification
- Kingdom: Animalia
- Phylum: Chordata
- Class: Actinopterygii
- Order: Blenniiformes
- Family: Chaenopsidae
- Genus: Emblemariopsis
- Species: E. diaphana

Binomial name
- Emblemariopsis diaphana Longley, 1927

Synonyms
- Chaenopsis diaphana (Longley, 1927); Coralliozetus diaphanus (Longley, 1927); Emblemaria diaphana (Longley, 1927)

= Emblemariopsis diaphana =

Species of fish

Emblemariopsis diaphana, the glass blenny, is a species of chaenopsid blenny found in coral reefs in the Florida Keys, USA, in the western central Atlantic ocean. It can reach a maximum length of 4 centimetres (1.6 in) TL. The specific name refers to this species being "largely translucent" in life, although this is lost in preserved specimens. E. diaphana is the type species of the genus Emblemariopsis.
