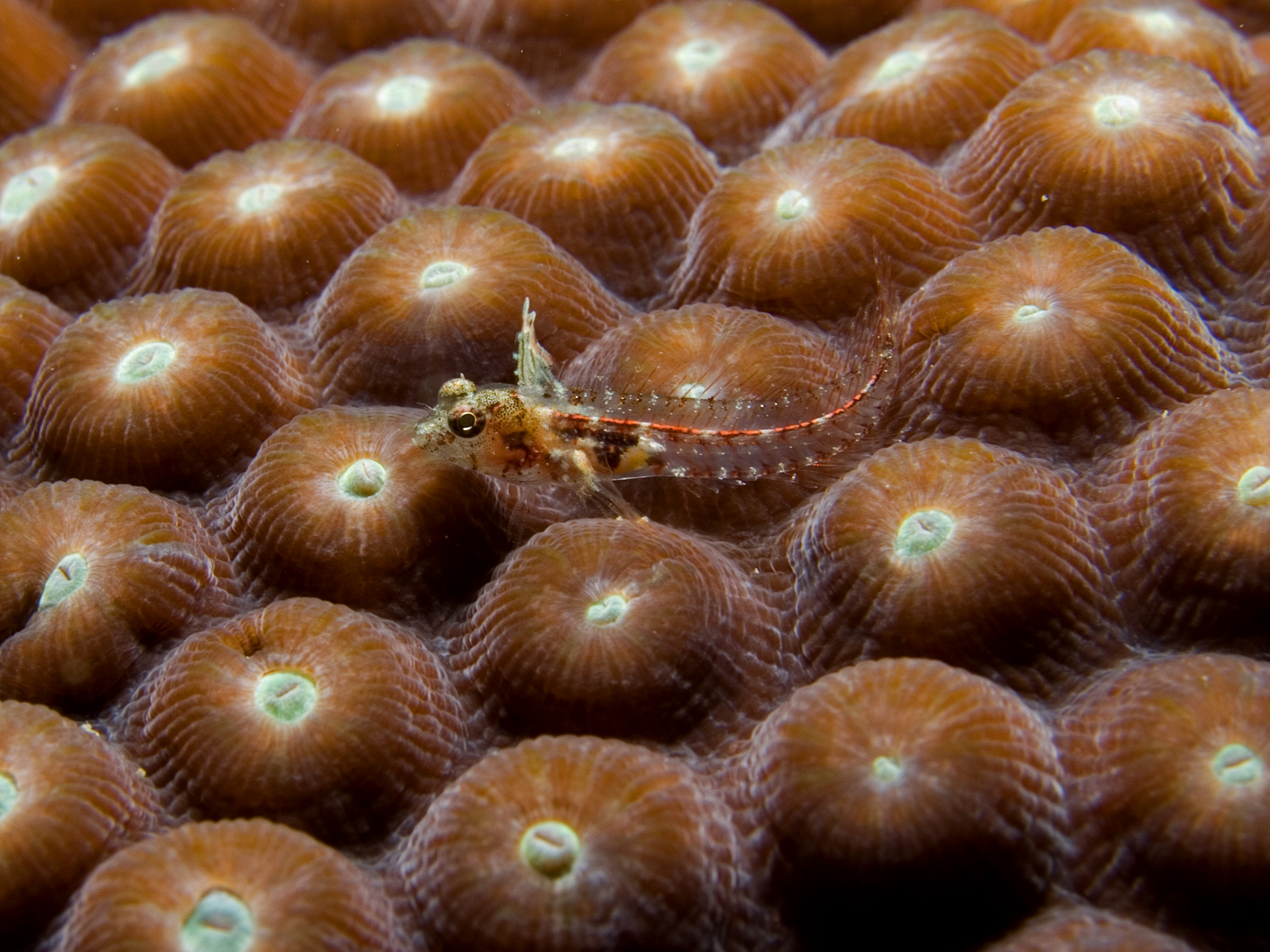
- E. carib

Scientific classification
- Kingdom: Animalia
- Phylum: Chordata
- Class: Actinopterygii
- Order: Blenniiformes
- Family: Chaenopsidae
- Genus: Emblemariopsis; Longley, 1927

Type species
- Emblemariopsis diaphana Longley, 1927

Synonyms
- Pseudemblemaria J.S. Stephens, 1961

= Emblemariopsis =

Genus of fishes

Emblemariopsis is a genus of flagblennies found throughout the Atlantic ocean.

== Species ==
There are currently 14 recognized species in this genus:

- Emblemariopsis arawak Victor, 2010
- Emblemariopsis bahamensis J. S. Stephens, 1961 (Blackhead blenny)
- Emblemariopsis bottomei J. S. Stephens, 1961 (Shorthead blenny)
- Emblemariopsis carib Victor, 2010
- Emblemariopsis dianae J. C. Tyler & Hastings, 2004 (Orangeflag blenny)
- Emblemariopsis diaphana Longley, 1927 (Glass blenny)
- Emblemariopsis falcon Victor 2020
- Emblemariopsis lancea Victor 2020
- Emblemariopsis leptocirris J. S. Stephens, 1970
- Emblemariopsis occidentalis J. S. Stephens, 1970 (Flagfin blenny)
- Emblemariopsis pricei D. W. Greenfield, 1975 (Seafan blenny)
- Emblemariopsis ramirezi (Cervigón, 1999)
- Emblemariopsis randalli Cervigón, 1965 (Hornless blenny)
- Emblemariopsis ruetzleri D. M. Tyler & J. C. Tyler, 1997
- Emblemariopsis signifer (Ginsburg, 1942)
- Emblemariopsis tayrona (Acero P., 1987) (Tayrona blenny)
