= El Luis =

El Luís
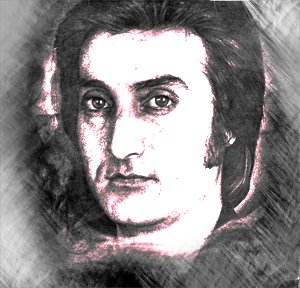

Background information
- Also known as: El Luis, El Gitano Argentino
- Born: Luis Barrull Salazar; 15 February 1948 (age 78); A Coruña, Galicia, Spain
- Origin: A Coruña, Spain
- Occupations: Musician, songwriter
- Instruments: Vocals, Spanish guitar
- Years active: 1976–1991
- Labels: CBS Records / Sony Music and Producciones A.R.

Luis Barrull Salazar (born 15 February 1948), better known as El Luis, is a Spanish singer in the style fusion of flamenco, soul and rock. His brother Antonio, known as El Zíngaro, is a rumba singer.

== Career ==
Barrull was born in A Coruña, Galicia, Spain, on 15 February 1948. As a young boy he moved to Argentina, where he stayed for 15 years. It was there where he started to sing flamenco.

After returning to Spain, he scored a huge hit with his first single "Te Lo Digo Cantando" in 1976. After releasing two full albums, El Luis in 1976 and Solo in 1978 both on CBS, Barrull was jailed in Madrid's Carabanchel Prison Madrid due to drug smuggling. While in jail he became more religious. After his release he went to New York to record his third album entitled Gitano Soul. All three albums were produced by José Luis de Carlos. He also wrote songs for Las Grecas, Los Chichos, and his brother El Zíngaro before retiring from the music business.

He made a comeback 1991 with Vis a Vis on AR Productions SL, an independent label owned by a former CBS executive, Alfonso Corral, specializing in keeping the flame of flamenco with pop artists like Camel, Chestnut and El Luis.

== Discography ==
=== Albums ===
- 1976: El Luis
- 1978: Solo
- 1981: Gitano Soul
- 1991: Vis a vis]

Compilation albums

- 2000: Yo te lo digo cantando
- 2002: Todas sus grabaciones (1976–1991)

=== Singles ===
- "Yo te lo digo cantando"
- "Beibe, no huyas más"
- "Pero qué es triste llorar y llorar"
- "Solo"
- "Llorando"
- "Oh, Libertad"
