= Emblemariopsis occidentalis =

Conservation status
- Least Concern (IUCN 3.1)

Scientific classification
- Kingdom: Animalia
- Phylum: Chordata
- Class: Actinopterygii
- Order: Blenniiformes
- Family: Chaenopsidae
- Genus: Emblemariopsis
- Species: E. occidentalis

Binomial name
- Emblemariopsis occidentalis J. S. Stephens, 1970

Species of fish

Emblemariopsis occidentalis, the flagfin blenny, blackfin blenny or redspine blenny, is a species of chaenopsid blenny found around the Bahamas, Brazil, and the Lesser Antilles, in the western Atlantic ocean. Males of this species can reach a maximum length of 1.9 centimetres (0.75 in) SL, while females can reach a maximum length of 1.7 centimetres (0.67 in).
