= Cirriemblemaria =

Conservation status
- Least Concern (IUCN 3.1)

Scientific classification
- Kingdom: Animalia
- Phylum: Chordata
- Class: Actinopterygii
- Division: Teleostei
- Order: Blenniiformes
- Family: Chaenopsidae
- Genus: Cirriemblemaria; Hastings, 1997
- Species: C. lucasana

Binomial name
- Cirriemblemaria lucasana (J. S. Stephens, 1963)

Synonyms
- Protemblemaria lucasana J. S. Stephens, 1963

Species of fish

Cirriemblemaria lucasana, the plume blenny, is a species of pikeblenny found in coral reefs in the Gulf of California. The species feeds primarily on zooplankton. It can reach a maximum total length of 4 centimetres (1.6 in).
