= Protemblemaria punctata =

Conservation status
- Least Concern (IUCN 3.1)

Scientific classification
- Kingdom: Animalia
- Phylum: Chordata
- Class: Actinopterygii
- Order: Blenniiformes
- Family: Chaenopsidae
- Genus: Protemblemaria
- Species: P. punctata

Binomial name
- Protemblemaria punctata Cervigón, 1966

Species of fish

Protemblemaria punctata, the warthead blenny, is a species of chaenopsid blenny endemic to the Atlantic coast of northeast Venezuela where it is found on shallow, sandy bottoms down to a depth of 20 metres (66 ft). This fish can reach a maximum size of 6 centimetres (2.4 in) TL.
