= Tanyemblemaria alleni =

Conservation status
- Data Deficient (IUCN 3.1)

Scientific classification
- Kingdom: Animalia
- Phylum: Chordata
- Class: Actinopterygii
- Order: Blenniiformes
- Family: Chaenopsidae
- Genus: Tanyemblemaria
- Species: T. alleni

Binomial name
- Tanyemblemaria alleni Hastings, 1992

Species of fish

Tanyemblemaria alleni, the slender blenny, is a species of chaenopsid blenny found around Panama, known from one species collected at Isla del Rey. It can reach a length of 5.4 centimetres (2.1 in) TL. The specific name honours the collector of the type, Gerald R. Allen of the Western Australia Museum in Perth.
