= Protemblemaria =

Scientific classification
- Kingdom: Animalia
- Phylum: Chordata
- Class: Actinopterygii
- Order: Blenniiformes
- Family: Chaenopsidae
- Genus: Protemblemaria; J. S. Stephens, 1963

Type species
- Emblemaria bicirrus Hildebrand, 1946

Genus of fishes

Protemblemaria is a genus of chaenopsid blennies found in the eastern Pacific as well as the western Atlantic oceans.

== Species ==
There are currently three recognized species in this genus:

- Protemblemaria bicirrus (Hildebrand, 1946) (Warthead blenny)
- Protemblemaria perla Hastings, 2001
- Protemblemaria punctata Cervigón, 1966
