= E. occidentalis =

E. occidentalis may refer to:

- Emblemariopsis occidentalis, the flagfin blenny, blackfin blenny or redspine blenny, a fish species found around the Bahamas, Brazil and the Lesser Antilles
- Euthamia occidentalis, the western goldentop or western goldenrod, a flowering plant species common in western North America

== See also ==
- List of Latin and Greek words commonly used in systematic names
