= Protemblemaria bicirrus =

Conservation status
- Least Concern (IUCN 3.1)

Scientific classification
- Kingdom: Animalia
- Phylum: Chordata
- Class: Actinopterygii
- Order: Blenniiformes
- Family: Chaenopsidae
- Genus: Protemblemaria
- Species: P. bicirrus

Binomial name
- Protemblemaria bicirrus (Hildebrand, 1946)

Synonyms
- Emblemaria bicirrus Hildebrand, 1946

Species of fish

Protemblemaria bicirrus, the warthead blenny, is a species of chaenopsid blenny found in rocky reefs from the Gulf of California to Peru, in the eastern Pacific ocean. It can reach a maximum length of 4.5 centimetres (1.8 in) TL.
