= Ekemblemaria =

Scientific classification
- Kingdom: Animalia
- Phylum: Chordata
- Class: Actinopterygii
- Order: Blenniiformes
- Family: Chaenopsidae
- Genus: Ekemblemaria; J. S. Stephens, 1963

Type species
- Ekemblemaria myersi J. S. Stephens, 1963

Genus of fishes

Ekemblemaria is a genus of chaenopsid blennies found in the eastern Pacific and western Atlantic oceans.

== Species ==
There are currently three recognized species in this genus:

- Ekemblemaria lira Hastings, 1992
- Ekemblemaria myersi J. S. Stephens, 1963 (Reefsand blenny)
- Ekemblemaria nigra (Meek & Hildebrand, 1928) (Moth blenny)
