= Hemiemblemaria simula =

Conservation status
- Least Concern (IUCN 3.1)

Scientific classification
- Kingdom: Animalia
- Phylum: Chordata
- Class: Actinopterygii
- Order: Blenniiformes
- Family: Chaenopsidae
- Genus: Hemiemblemaria
- Species: H. simula

Binomial name
- Hemiemblemaria simula Longley & Hildebrand, 1940

Synonyms
- Hemiemblemaria simulus (basionym)

Species of fish

Hemiemblemaria simula, the wrasse blenny, is a species of chaenopsid blenny found in coral reefs in the western Atlantic ocean. It can reach a maximum length of 10 centimetres (3.9 in) fish measurement. This species feeds primarily on small crustaceans and finfish. This species is also found in the aquarium trade. It is the only known member of its genus.

== Nomenclature ==
The species was originally described as Hemiemblemaria simulus by Longley & Hildebrand in 1940. Within the same publication, the authors also used the spelling simula, correcting the epithet to agree grammatically with the feminine genus name Hemiemblemaria. Because this correction appears in the original work and represents an intentional change to a faulty Latin ending, it is treated as a justified emendation under Article 33.2.1 of the International Code of Zoological Nomenclature. No First Reviser action or ICZN Opinion was involved. The valid name is therefore Hemiemblemaria simula Longley & Hildebrand, 1940.
