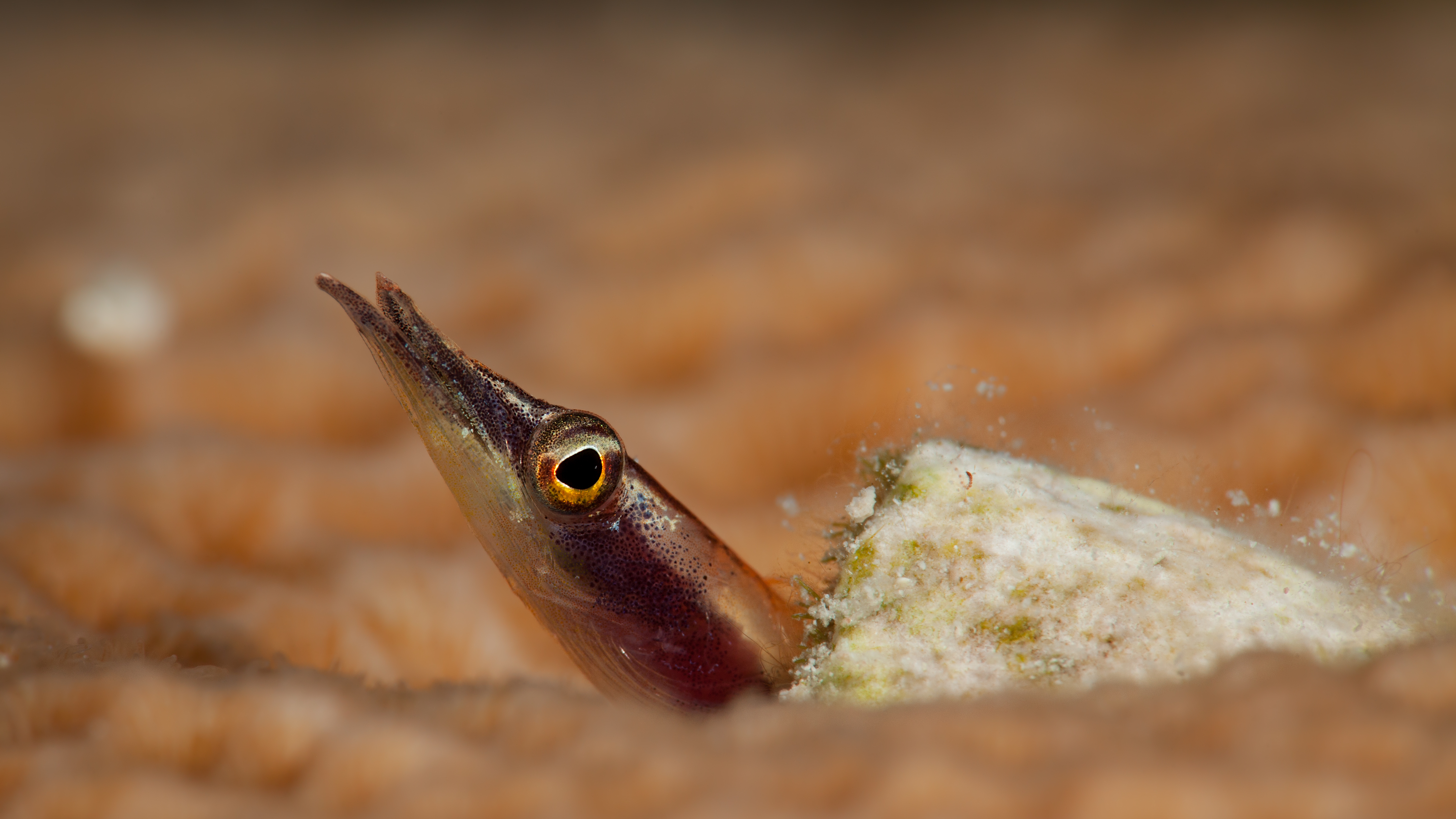

Conservation status
- Least Concern (IUCN 3.1)

Scientific classification
- Kingdom: Animalia
- Phylum: Chordata
- Class: Actinopterygii
- Order: Blenniiformes
- Family: Chaenopsidae
- Genus: Lucayablennius; Böhlke, 1958
- Species: L. zingaro

Binomial name
- Lucayablennius zingaro (Böhlke, 1957)

Synonyms
- Lucaya zingaro Böhlke, 1957

= Lucayablennius zingaro =

Species of fish

Lucayablennius zingaro, the arrow blenny, is a species of chaenopsid blenny found in coral reefs around the Bahamas and the Caribbean, in the western central Atlantic Ocean. It can reach a maximum length of 5.7 cm (2.2 in). This species is the only known member of its genus.

== Habitat ==
The arrow blenny can be found in coastal coral reefs near the Bahamas, Caribbean, and western Atlantic Ocean. Their range extends as far west as the western side of the Yucatán Peninsula, as far north as the Florida Keys, and as far south as the eastern tip of South America. Their depth range is typically 13 to 106 meters (43 to 348 ft).

== Description ==
The arrow blenny is truly unique among blennys regarding their appearance. They have an elongated pointed snout which they use for catching prey. Their coloration is typically a cinnamon red or brown which fades to yellow towards the tail. They have three stripes, one white one on the top center of the head ending at the base of the dorsal fin, and one on each side starting at the front of the eyes and running to the base of the caudal fin. Both of these side stripes start white and fade to yellow. They also have black spots, three on the rear of the dorsal fin and two on the rear of the anal fin. Their tail, being truly unique, is always held at a curve. So much so that the tail is facing the same direction as the head. This tail curve allows the fish to catch small currents in the water column.
