= Zíngaro =

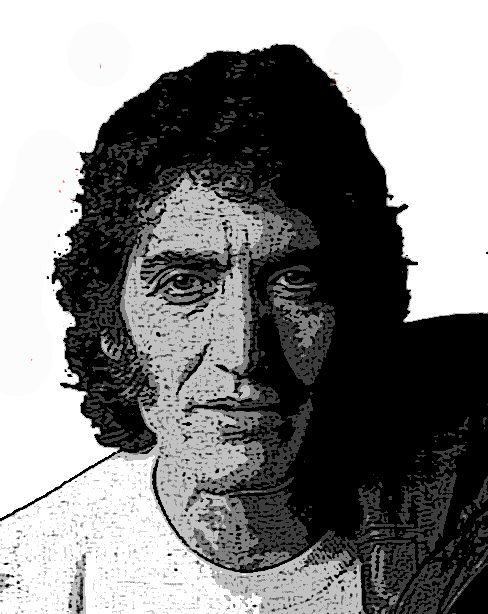

Background information
- Birth name: Antonio Barrull Salazar
- Also known as: El Zíngaro
- Born: 12 August 1949 (age 75); A Coruña, Galicia, Spain
- Origin: A Coruña, Spain
- Genres: Flamenco, rumba, flamenco fusión
- Occupation(s): Musician, songwriter
- Instrument(s): Vocals, Spanish guitar
- Years active: 1979–2003
- Labels: CBS Records / Sony Music and Producciones A.R.

Antonio Salazar Barrull (born 1949 in A Coruña), known as Zíngaro, is a Spanish singer and composer of Gypsy origin, whose style corresponds to a merger between Flamenco, jazz and rock that began in the late 1970s. He is the brother of another artist: Luis Salazar Barrull, best known as El Luis.

== Personal life ==
He moved to Argentina, where he lived for almost 14 years. He began composing on the guitar and he was encouraged to return to Spain for better opportunities where his brother had become successful. Upon his return, he was managed by his brother for his first studio recordings.

He followed the style of Manzanita, with a voice full of personality, charm and charisma. His music, and playing, aroused curiosity to listeners of traditional flamenco from first notes. His producer Jose Luis de Carlos, also his mentor, presented his work as a new style between pop and flamenco, serious, rigorous, contemporary, passionate and visionary with jazz and black music influences. Career highlights included his first LPs. The debut album titled Voz De Luna in 1979 included singles "Llorarás de pena" and "Chie, Chie".

His second album Sones de llanto y fuego included musical contributions by Plum on Spanish guitar, Luis "Manglis" Cobo on acoustic and electric guitar, Dave Thomas on bass and Tito Duarte on drums and percussion. The songs were mostly written by El Zingaro, with others by Jesus Conde, R. Barrull Jimenez, Sandro and Manzanita. The single chosen was "No te voy a perdonar".

From 1989 to 1992, he released four more albums.

== Discography ==
=== Albums ===
- 1979: Voz De Luna
- 1980: Sones de Llanto y Fuego
- 1989: Ama Tu Libertad
- 1990: Gitano Poeta
- 1991: Esa Señora
- 1992: Cuidado Camarada

Compilations

- 2000: Llorarás

=== Singles ===
- 1979: "Llorarás De Pena" (from Voz De Luna)
- 1979: "Chie, Chie" (from Voz De Luna)
- 1980: "No Te Voy A Perdonar" (from Sones de Llanto y Fuego)
