= Millard C. Marsh =

American biologist

- Born: December 24, 1872; Groton, New York
- Died: June 21, 1936 (aged 63); Buffalo, New York
- Education: Cornell University; Johns Hopkins University
- Scientific career
- Fields: biology
- Workplaces: New York State Institute for the Study of Malignant Disease, now Roswell Park Comprehensive Cancer Center

Millard Caleb Marsh (24 December 1872 – 21 June 1936) was an American biologist, geneticist and cancer researcher.

== Early life and education ==
Born in Groton, New York, in 1872, Marsh attended Cornell University, graduating with a Bachelor of Science degree in 1896. He later pursued graduate studies at Johns Hopkins University, where he earned a Master of Science degree.

== Career ==
=== United States Fish Commission ===
Before completing his studies at Cornell, Marsh joined the United States Fish Commission as a Scientific Assistant. He specialized in fish diseases, conducted research in the United States and Puerto Rico, and co-authored a book on tropical fishes with Barton Warren Evermann.

=== Alaska and the Bureau of Fisheries ===
In 1907, Marsh was appointed Agent for the Protection of the Salmon Fisheries in Alaska and was based primarily in Juneau. In 1911, he was appointed Sea Naturalist to the Pribilof Islands in the Bering Sea, where he spent thirteen months studying seals behavior, and discovered a germ that was causing widespread disease among the seals.

=== Cancer research ===
Marsh's interest in cancer research developed from observations of tumors in fish. After collaborating with Harvey R. Gaylord on studies of thyroid tumors in fish, he resigned from the Bureau of Fisheries in 1912 to join the New York State Institute for the Study of Malignant Disease (now Roswell Park Comprehensive Cancer Center) in Buffalo, New York, as a biologist.

The following year, he studied at the German Cancer Institute in Heidelberg under Theodor von Wasielewski before returning to the United States shortly before the outbreak of the First World War. In 1918 he became director of the New York State Institute's biological station in Springville, New York.

Marsh's research focused on the hereditary basis of cancer, experimental mouse genetics, and chemotherapy. He developed inbred strains of laboratory mice and established transplantable tumor lines that were distributed to researchers internationally. These strains include the MA/MyJ mice (Marsh Albino/Murray). He also tested chemical compounds as potential cancer treatments. He served as president of the American Association for Cancer Research in 1934-35.

== Personal life ==
Marsh lived in Springville, New York, from 1918 until his death. He was a charter member of the Springville Country Club and served as secretary of the Springville Board of Trade. He never married.

== Death ==
Marsh died in Buffalo, New York, on June 21, 1936, following complications from surgery for a duodenal ulcer. He was 63 years old.
