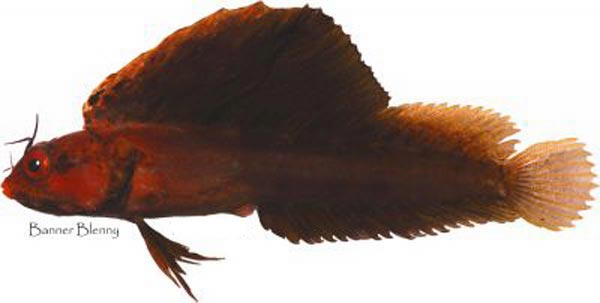
- Emblemaria atlantica

Scientific classification
- Kingdom: Animalia
- Phylum: Chordata
- Class: Actinopterygii
- Order: Blenniiformes
- Suborder: Blennioidei
- Family: Chaenopsidae; T. N. Gill, 1865

Genera
- Acanthemblemaria; Chaenopsis; Cirriemblemaria; Coralliozetus; Ekemblemaria; Emblemaria; Emblemariopsis; Hemiemblemaria; Lucayablennius; Mccoskerichthys; Neoclinus; Protemblemaria; Stathmonotus; Tanyemblemaria

= Chaenopsidae =

Family of fishes

The blennioid family Chaenopsidae includes the pike-blennies, tube-blennies, and flagblennies, all percomorph marine fish in the order Blenniiformes. The family is strictly tropical, ranging from North to South America. Members are also present in waters off Japan, Taiwan and Korea. Fourteen genera and 91 species are represented, the largest being the sarcastic fringehead, Neoclinus blanchardi, at 30 cm (12 in) in length; most are much smaller, and the group includes perhaps the smallest of all vertebrates, Acanthemblemaria paula, measuring just 1.3 cm (0.51 in) long as an adult.

With highly compressed bodies, some may be so elongated as to appear eel-like; chaenopsids are scaleless and lack lateral lines. Their heads are rough and may be armed with spines. There may be 17 to 28 spines in the dorsal fin, with two in the anal fin.

The habit of taking up home in abandoned worm tubes has earned some species in this family the name "tube-blenny". Many will also inhabit empty clam shells, which also serve as nesting sites; males are known to guard the brood. Some species have dorsal fins which are significantly higher towards the head, explaining the moniker "flagblenny". Crustaceans make up the bulk of the chaenopsid diet.

At least one species found in the Caribbean, Emblemariopsis diaphana, is known to form a symbiotic relationship with stony coral, Meandrina meandrites.

According to some authorities the Chaenopsidae is not monophyletic if the genera Neoclinus and Stathmonotus are included. They propose that Stathmonotus be included in the family Labrisomidae and that Neoclinus, and the closely related Mccoskerichthys, be placed in the tribe Neoclinini, stating that further study is required to clarify this clade's true relationships.
