= Xeko =

Collectible card game revolving around endangered species

- Designers: Amy Tucker; Tyler Bielman
- Publishers: Matter Group
- Players: 2
- Setup time: 1–5 minutes
- Playing time: 15 minutes
- Chance: Some
- Age range: 8 +
- Skills: Strategy; Counting

Xeko is an out-of-print collectible card game revolving around endangered species. It was launched on Earthday 2006. It won the Creative Child Magazine 2006 Toy of the Year Award and the National Parenting Center's Seal of Approval in its first year. Four "Mission" sets have been released. Mission: Costa Rica and Mission: Madagascar, based on biodiversity hotspots were released first. Mission: Indonesia, was released in 2007, with the final release, Mission: China, was released July 19, 2008. A total of thirty more missions were planned but never developed.

Xeko was invented by Amy Tucker and designed by Tyler Bielman, a Seattle-based game designer. "Xeko is dedicated to a bright green future and preserving some of our planet's greatest riches".

In addition to attempting to raise awareness using the game itself, Matter Group (the company that produces Xeko) has the following programs and processes in place:

- Xeko's Green Stars Program accepts recycled booster pack wrappers in exchange for points in Club Xeko.
- 4 percent of Xeko game net sales are donated to Conservation International.
- All Xeko game materials and packaging are made with recycled and recyclable materials.
- Only eco-friendly inks that are kinder to the environment are used in production.

In 2009, Xeko was sold to an Atlanta game studio, Good Egg Studios, and merged with the Gaming for Good virtual world. As of September 2010, the official Xeko website was closed and no reopening date has been posted. Reports have surfaced that Good Egg Studios has gone out of business and Xeko was acquired by Oomba. Oomba later raised $250,000 from Kickstarter, there has been no such implementation and the project appears to have been dropped.

== Artwork ==
As with many trading card games, the card art is drawn by a variety of different artists with different styles. The card artists include Michel Gagné, Travis Kotzebue, BJ Nartker, and others. Six limited print sketch cards are also available and can only be obtained in Starter Decks.

== Card types ==
The following four types of cards are featured in the game:

- Species - A species card can be any type of animal, insect, or plant.
- Boost - A boost card is an instant energy modifier used during turf wars.
- Xeko - A Xeko card is an environment modifier that can affect any aspect of the game.
- Hotspot - A hotspot card is only used as a building block to start the game.

Each card is also assigned a rarity rating of one to four, one being the most common and four being the rarest. In the Xeko nomenclature, these are Common, Rare, Endangered, and Vanishing. The rarity of a card can be checked at a glance by counting the dots the bottom right-hand corner.

Next to the rarity rating is a two-letter abbreviation that designates the edition in which the card was released, as follows:

MM = Madagascar, CR = Costa Rica, IN = Indonesia, CH = China

== Gameplay ==
Xeko centered on biodiversity hot spots representing actual location around the globe. Using the cards drawn throughout the game, players created an ecosystem interconnected by different colors found around the rim of the cards. Each card had a value in "eco-points," the game's scoring system. Turns were representative of a Night - Day cycle, in which each player adds elements to the overall ecosystem through new species or other effect cards. This adding of species triggered a turf war in which the two connected species "battle". In most cases neither of the species died. Instead, the loser of the turf war had to discard cards from the top of their deck. The game ended when one play's deck had no more cards, and the winner was chosen by whoever possesses the most eco-points at the end of the game.

== Animals and plants of Mission: Madagascar ==
- Alluaudia spiny plant, Alluaudia montagnacii
- Aye-aye, Daubentonia madagascariensis
- Brown mouse lemur, Microcebus griseorufus
- Carnivorous pitcher plant, Nepenthes madagascariensis
- Clear-winged butterfly
- Comet moth, Argema mittrei
- Comet orchid, Angraecum sesquipedale
- Commerson's leaf-nosed bat, Hipposideros commersoni
- Coppery day gecko, Phelsuma madagascariensis
- Dutchman's pipe, Aristolochia
- Fire millipede, Aphistotoniulus
- Flat-tailed tortoise, Pyxis planicauda
- Fossa, Cryptoprocta ferox
- Giant bamboo, Cathariostachys madagascariensis
- Giant jumping rat
- Giant leaf-tailed gecko
- Giant striped mongoose
- Giraffe-necked weevil
- Golden bamboo lemur
- Golden crowned lemur
- Golden frog
- Golden tortoise beetle
- Grandidier baobab
- Greater hedgehog tenrec
- Hairy-eared dwarf lemur
- Hawk moth
- Hawksbill sea turtle
- Indri
- Katydid
- Leatherback sea turtle
- Loggerhead sea turtle
- Madagascan tree boa
- Madagascar crested ibis
- Madagascar fish eagle
- Madagascan flying fox
- Madagascar ground boa
- Madagascar ground gecko
- Madagascar heron
- Madagascar hissing cockroach
- Madagascar leaf-nosed snake
- Madagascar serpent eagle
- Madagascar sideneck turtle
- Madagascar teal
- Malagasy ring-tailed mongoose
- Nile crocodile
- Olive ridley sea turtle
- Orange pill millipede
- Oustalet's chameleon
- Panther chameleon
- Ploughshare tortoise
- Pygmy leaf chameleon
- Radiated tortoise
- Red owl
- Ring-tailed lemur
- Running coua
- Unidentified scorpion
- Sickle-billed vanga
- Spider tortoise
- Striped civet
- Tamarind tree
- Thorn spider
- Tomato frog
- Traveler's palm
- Van Dam's vanga
- Verreaux's sifaka
- Voantany
- White lotus
- White-breasted mesite
- Woolly lemur
- Yellow-line moth

== Animals and plants of Mission: Costa Rica ==
- Africanized bee
- Almendro, Dipteryx panamensis
- American crocodile
- American manatee, Trichechus manatus
- Baird's tapir
- Basilisk lizard
- Big leaf mahogany
- Black-cheeked ant tanager
- Bottlenose dolphin
- Bromeliad
- Brown-throated three-toed sloth
- Bullseye electric ray
- Central American squirrel monkey
- Central American woolly opossum
- Cocos finch
- Common caiman
- Coral spotted rain frog
- Costa Rica golden frog, Atelopus zeteki
- Costus tree
- Cow tree
- Crested caracara
- Dice's cottontail
- Dracula orchid
- Ducktail moth
- Fer-de-lance
- Fiery-bellied aracari
- Fig wasp
- Fishing bulldog bat
- Galapagos petrel
- Giant damselfly
- Giant whale shark
- Golden eyelash viper
- Golden orb weaver
- Goliath grouper
- Granular poison frog
- Great green macaw
- Green turtle
- Guanacaste tree
- Guaria morada
- Guatemalan cracker
- Gumbo limbo
- Harlequin frog
- Harris's olingo
- Harris's rice water rat
- Hawksbill sea turtle
- Hercules beetle
- Hotlips
- Humpback whale
- Jabiru stork
- Jaguar
- Kapok tree
- Keel-billed motmot
- Keel-billed toucan
- Kinkajou
- Laughing falcon
- Leaf-cutter ant
- Leatherback sea turtle
- Lichen katydid
- Lungless salamander
- Mangrove hummingbird
- Mantled howler monkey
- Morpho butterfly
- Mouthless crab
- Ocelot
- Olive ridley sea turtle
- Owl butterfly
- Pacific seahorse
- Pink-footed shearwater
- Plantation banana
- Rainbow parrotfish
- Rana De Hojarasca
- Red porgy
- Red-eyed tree frog
- Red-fronted parrotlet
- Resplendent quetzal
- Roseate spoonbill
- Sawfish
- Scalloped hammerhead shark
- Scarlet macaw
- South American cedar
- Spectacled owl
- Spider monkey
- Stink bug
- Strangler fig
- Strawberry poison arrow frog
- Swallow-tailed kite
- Tamandua
- Tawny-chested flycatcher
- Tea mangrove
- Three-wattled bellbird
- Tropical pocket gopher
- Turquoise cotinga
- Volcano knobtail
- White-lipped peccary
- Yellow-billed cotinga
- Zebra tarantula

== Animals and plants of Mission: Indonesia ==
- Acropora
- Ant plant
- Ashy tailorbird
- Asian elephant
- Asian giant softshell turtle
- Asian palm civet
- Atlas moth
- Bali starling
- Banded flying frog
- Blanford's flying dragon
- Bleeding toad
- Bornean flat-headed frog
- Bornean orangutan
- Bornean peacock-pheasant
- Clouded leopard
- Clubnose guitarfish
- Coffee
- Cogongrass
- Dead-leaf mantis
- Earless monitor lizard
- Elongated caecilian
- False gharial
- Fireflies
- Flat-headed cat
- Gaur
- Giant grouper
- Giant pitcher plant
- Golden arowana
- Golden flying snake
- Green peafowl
- Green turtle
- Hedgehog seahorse
- Humphead wrasse
- Javan hawk-eagle
- Javan kingfisher
- Javan owlet
- Javan rhinoceros
- Javan trogon
- Javan warty pig
- Javanese lapwing
- Knifetooth sawfish
- Lichen huntsmen
- Longtail seamoth
- Malayan flying frog
- Malayan horned frog
- Malaysian orchid mantis
- Mango
- Milky stork
- Mottled eagle ray
- Mountain blackeye
- Mountain serpent-eagle
- Nicobar megapode
- Orca
- Otter civet
- Painted terrapin
- Pearly treefrog
- Pink-headed fruit dove
- Pondicherry shark
- Proboscis monkey
- Pygmy seahorse
- Rafflesia
- Red durian (Note: 'Red durian' species: Durio dulcis, D. graveolens, and D. kutejensis are all listed as Vulnerable species by IUCN)
- Red lionfish
- Red mangrove
- Salvadori's nightjar
- Sappan
- Scarce blue tiger
- Siamese algae eater
- Siamese fighting fish
- Silver shark
- Silvery gibbon
- Slow loris
- Spiny turtle
- Spotted dolphin
- Stag beetle
- Stick insect
- Storm's stork
- Sumatran flying squirrel
- Sumatran orangutan
- Sumatran rhinoceros
- Sumatran tiger
- Wagler's pit viper
- Wattle cicada
- Wattled pheasant
- Weaver ant
- Western tarsier
- Whitehead's spiderhunter
- White-spotted wedgefish

== Animals and plants of Mission: China ==
- Adanson's house jumper
- Alpine stream salamander
- Argali
- Asiatic black bear
- Asiatic honey bee
- Asiatic toad
- Black snub-nosed monkey
- Black-necked crane
- Blue-tailed bee-eater
- Chevron-spotted brown frog
- China grass lizard
- Chinese bird spider
- Chinese giant salamander
- Chinese ginseng
- Chinese monal
- Chinese softshell turtle
- Chinese sumac
- Cinereous vulture
- Club-tailed cruiser
- Dawn redwood
- Dollarbird
- Emei moustache toad
- Eurasian minnow
- European otter
- Eyeless golden-line fish
- Forest crested lizard
- Gaoligong pika
- Gaur
- Gejiu blind loach
- Giant panda
- Golden eagle
- Golden snub-nosed monkey
- Greater false vampire bat
- Greater painted snipe
- Green hopper
- Horned lark
- Hundred-pace viper
- Hyaline fish
- Ide
- Indian rice frog
- Kaiser-i-hind
- King cobra
- Kozlov's shrew
- Leopard
- Liangbei toothed toad
- Lichuan bell toad
- Little owl
- Long-eared owl
- Longdong stream salamander
- Malayan porcupine
- Mandarin salamander
- Nine-spined stickleback
- Pearl-banded rat snake
- Piebald alpine toad
- Pinchon's salamander
- Pine shoot beetle
- Predatory bush cricket
- Raccoon dog
- Rat flea
- Red climbing mouse
- Red giant flying squirrel
- Red panda
- Reeves's turtle
- Rhododendron
- Rice
- Roach
- Saker falcon
- Scarce blue tiger
- Schlegel's Japanese gecko
- Sclater's monal
- Shanghai elegant skink
- Sichuan treecreeper
- Silkmoth
- Smew
- Snow leopard
- Stone loach
- Streaked spiderhunter
- Taliang knobby newt
- Tea plant
- Tibetan antelope
- Tibetan macaque
- Umbrella bamboo
- Varroa mite
- Wallcreeper
- Whiskered yuhina
- White-speckled laughingthrush
