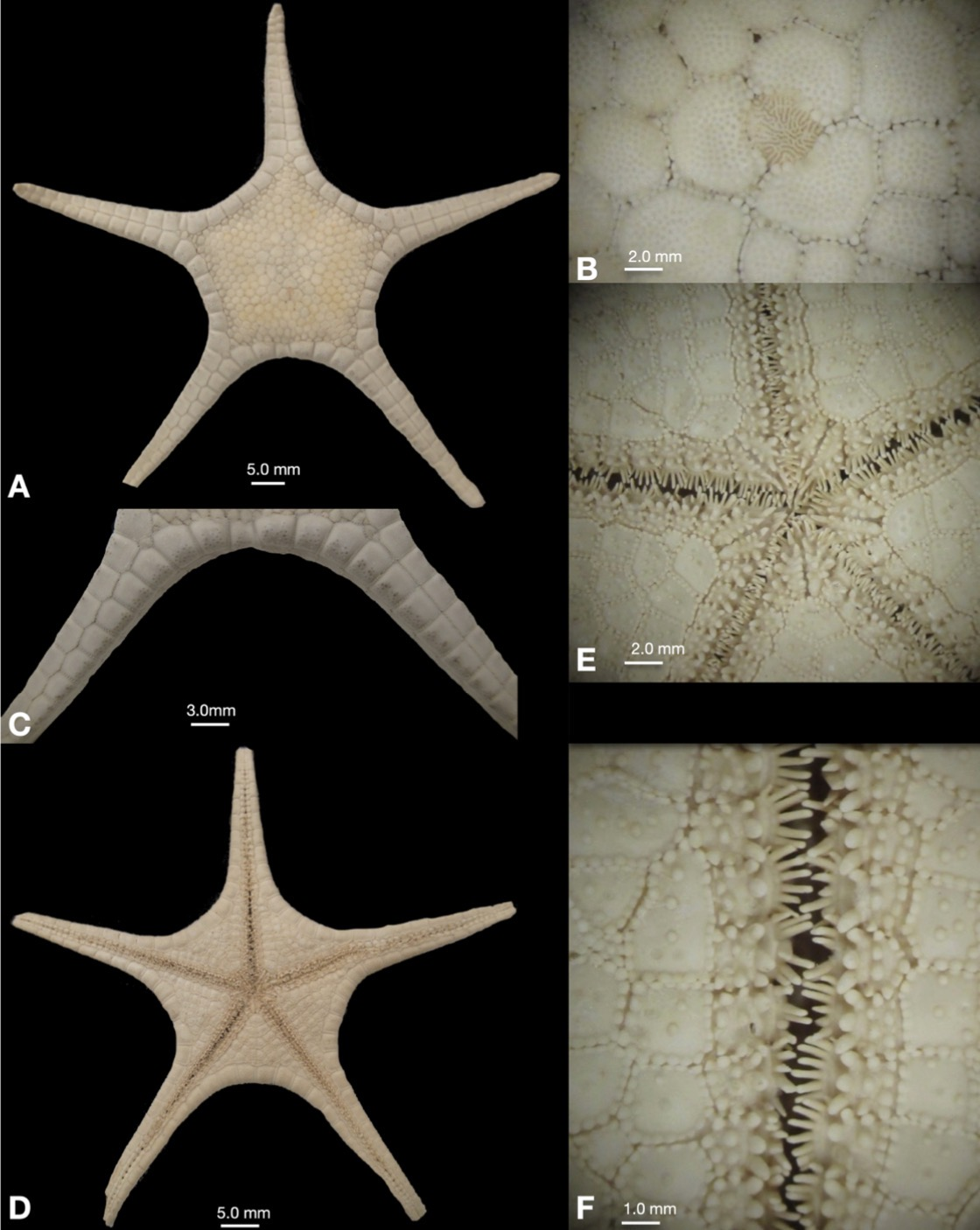

Scientific classification
- Kingdom: Animalia
- Phylum: Echinodermata
- Class: Asteroidea
- Order: Valvatida
- Family: Goniasteridae
- Genus: Astroceramus
- Species: A. callimorphus

Binomial name
- Astroceramus callimorphus (Fisher, 1906)

= Astroceramus callimorphus =

Species of sea star

Astroceramus callimorphus is a species of sea star in the family Goniasteridae. It is found in the Hawaiian Islands and off New Caledonia at depths of 233–1000 meters.

== Description ==
The species has a stout, stellate to strongly stellate body with elongate arms and straight to weakly curved interradii. Abactinal plates are restricted to the disk; superomarginal plates are abutted, with approximately 4 to 6 free superomarginals on the disk. Glassy nodules form stellate patterns on each abactinal plate. Superomarginal plates are covered by widely distributed granules (10–70). Actinal plates are covered by round to bullet-shaped granules. Furrow spines number 6 to 7. Subambulacral spines number 2 to 3 and are consistently enlarged; all three are variably enlarged in larger individual. Spoon-shaped pedicellariae are variably present on actinal and adambulacral plates, ranging from absent to present on over 50% of plates.

== Distribution and habitat ==
This species is known from the Hawaiian Islands at 233 meters and from off New Caledonia at depths of 317 to 1000 meters. In situ observations in Hawaii show it on coarse, sandy sedimented bottoms.
