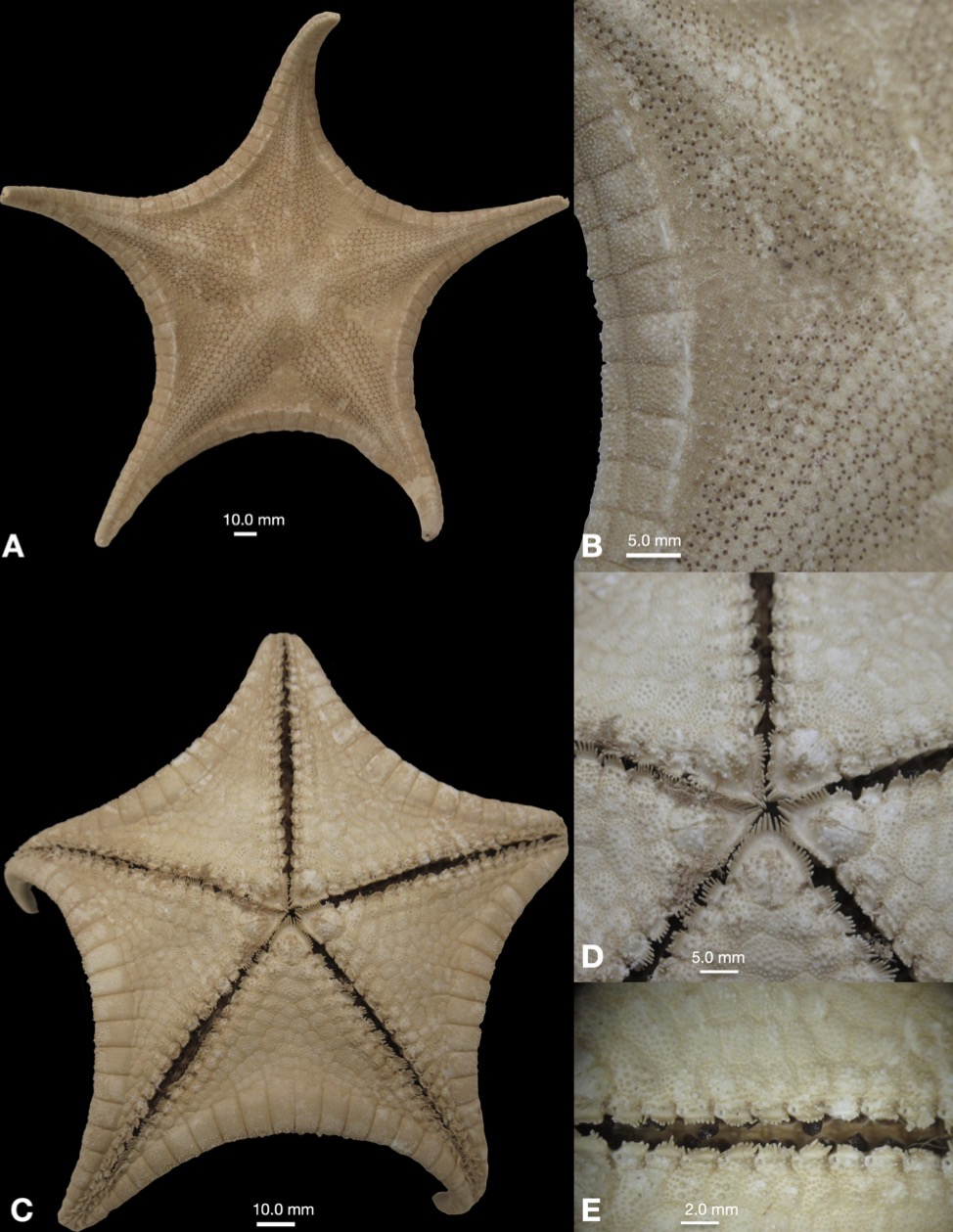

Scientific classification
- Kingdom: Animalia
- Phylum: Echinodermata
- Class: Asteroidea
- Order: Valvatida
- Family: Goniasteridae
- Genus: Anthenoides
- Species: A. granulosus

Binomial name
- Anthenoides granulosus Fisher, 1913

Synonyms
- Anthenoides rugulosus Fisher, 1913

= Anthenoides granulosus =

Species of sea star

Anthenoides granulosus is a species of sea star in the family Goniasteridae. It is widely distributed in the Indo-Pacific at depths of 143–731 meters.

== Description ==
The species has a stellate body with triangular, tapering arms and curved interradial arcs. Spines are absent from the inferomarginal plates. There is variably fine to coarse granulation on the superomarginals. Furrow spines are thick and number six to eight. A duck-bill or straight pedicellariae is present abactinally and on the proximal side of the adambulacral plates.

== Distribution and habitat ==
This species has a wide Indo-Pacific distribution, recorded from the Philippines, Maluku Islands, Papua New Guinea, Solomon Islands, Vanuatu, New South Wales (Australia), Norfolk Island, near Raoul Island (Kermadec Islands), New Zealand, Madagascar, and New Caledonia. Depth range is 143 to 731 meters. In New Caledonia, it is found at 192–580 meters.
