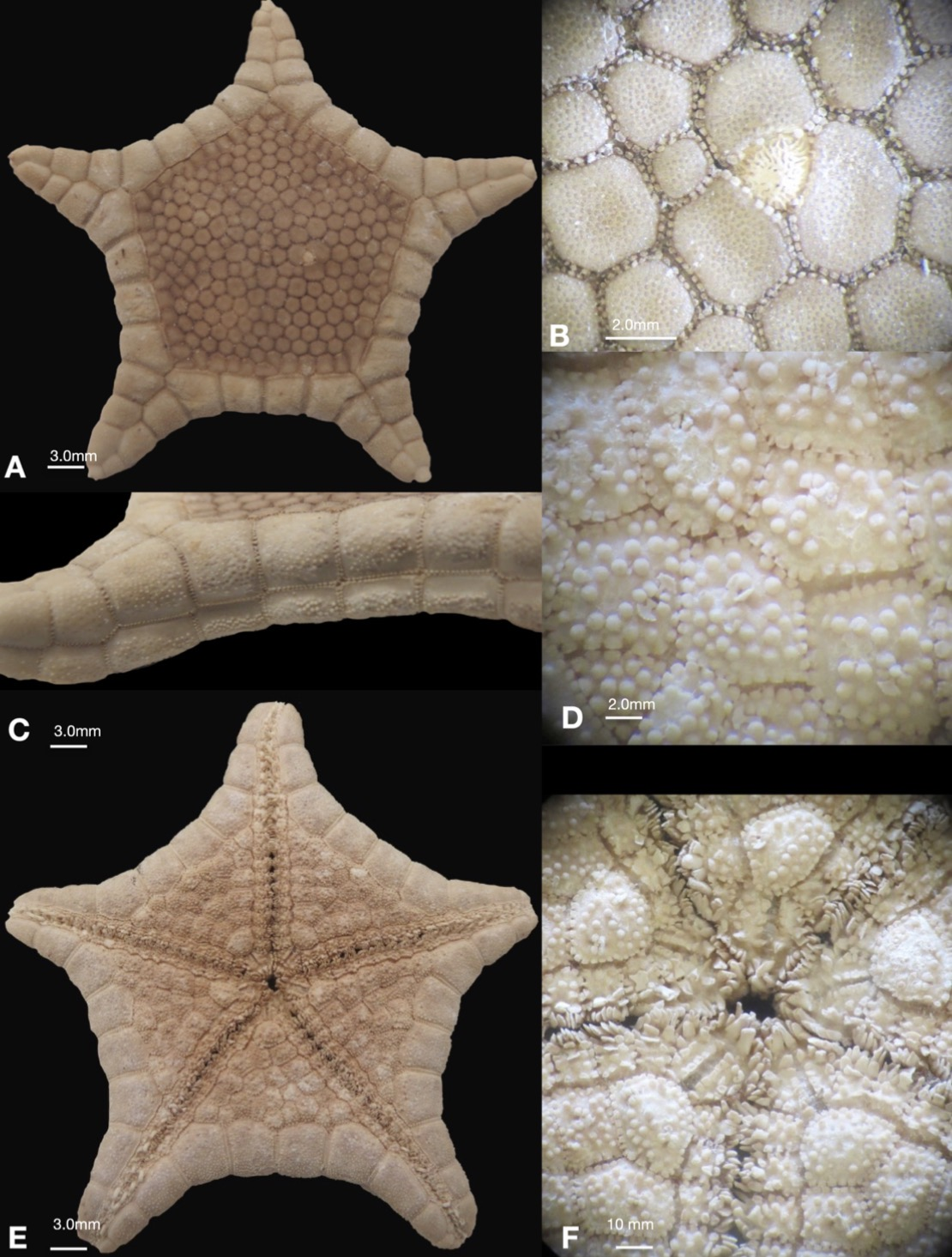

Scientific classification
- Kingdom: Animalia
- Phylum: Echinodermata
- Class: Asteroidea
- Order: Valvatida
- Family: Goniasteridae
- Genus: Astroceramus
- Species: A. astrikos

Binomial name
- Astroceramus astrikos Mah, 2026

= Astroceramus astrikos =

Species of sea star

Astroceramus astrikos is a species of sea star in the family Goniasteridae found off New Caledonia.

== Etymology ==
The species epithet astrikos is Greek for "of the stars".

== Taxonomy and systematics ==
The species displays an immediate resemblance to the Hawaiian Astroceramus eldredgei in having relatively short arms with wide, abutted superomarginals and a low R/r ratio. However, A. astrikos displays consistently fewer superomarginals (2 to 3 abutted plates per arm versus 4 to 6 in A. eldredgei) and fewer marginal plates per interradius (6 to 8 versus 12 to 16 in A. eldredgei). Actinal granulation is coarser in A. eldredgei, and its furrow and subambulacral spines are larger and thicker.

== Description ==
The species has a stout, weakly stellate to pentagonal body with short arms and straight interradial arcs. Abactinal plates are polygonal to round, with 40–200 crystalline bosses embedded in each plate surface. Superomarginal plates are abutted over the midline for the entirety of the arm, composed of 2 to 3 plates; there are 6 to 10 marginal plates per interradius (arm tip to arm tip). Individual marginal plates are covered by 40–250 evenly distributed granules. Inferomarginals have small paddle-shaped pedicellariae with valves bearing 4 to 6 interclasping teeth. Actinal plates are covered by coarse, round granules (3 to 20 per plate) and 1 or 2 paddle-like pedicellariae. Furrow spines number 5 to 6 (primarily six), are strongly flattened with blade-like, wide tips. Subambulacral spines immediately adjacent to the furrow number 3 or 4, with one prominent elongate pedicellariae present median to the others.

== Distribution and habitat ==
This species is known from off New Caledonia at depths of 370 to 621 meters.
