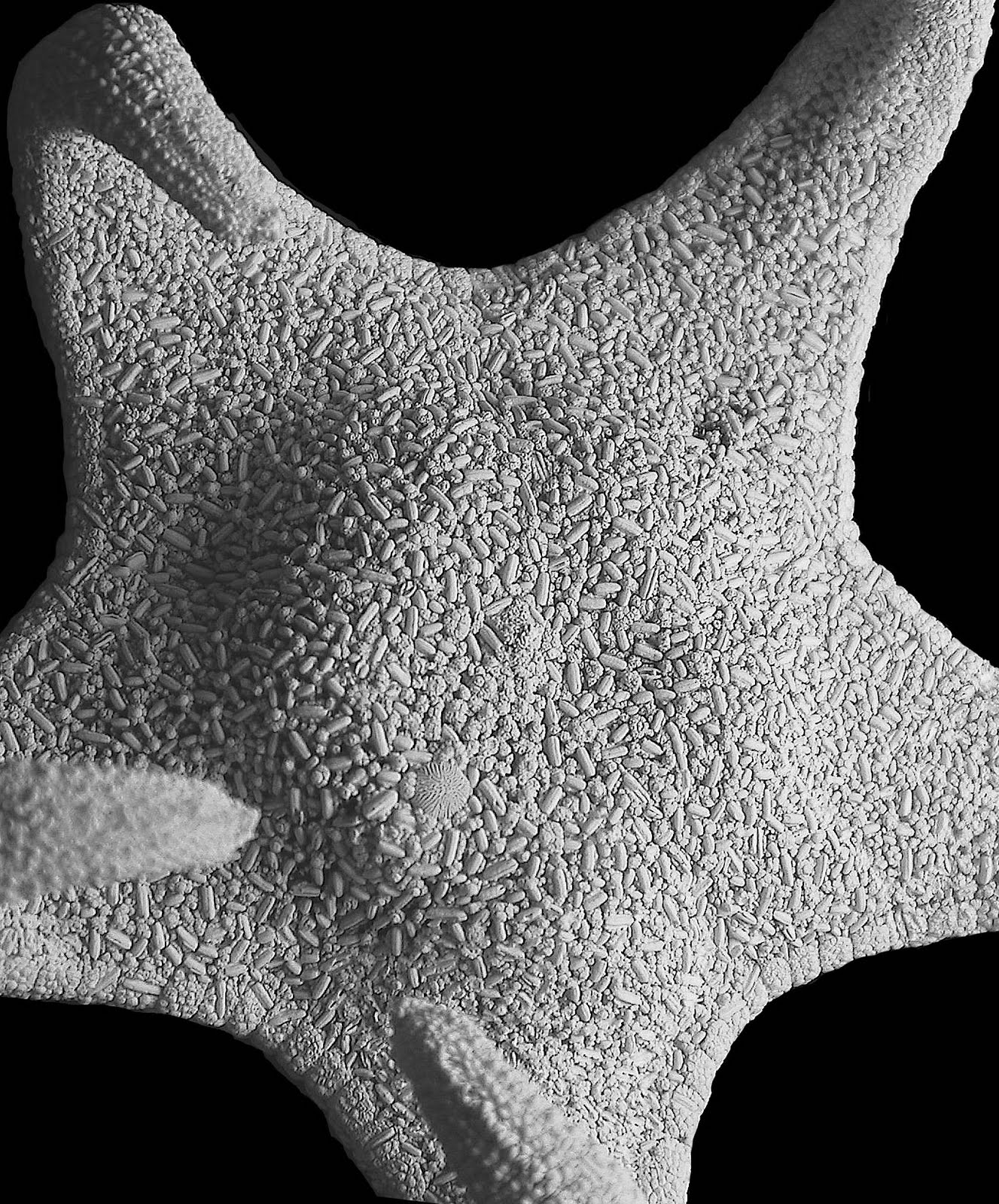
- Gilbertaster caribaea

Scientific classification
- Kingdom: Animalia
- Phylum: Echinodermata
- Class: Asteroidea
- Order: Valvatida
- Family: Goniasteridae
- Subfamily: Hippasterinae
- Genus: Gilbertaster; Fisher, 1906

= Gilbertaster =

Genus of starfishes

Gilbertaster is a genus of echinoderms belonging to the family Goniasteridae.

The species of this genus are found in Australia and America.

Species:

- Gilbertaster anacanthus Fisher, 1906
- Gilbertaster caribaea (Verrill, 1899)
