= Anthenoides epixanthus =

Scientific classification
- Kingdom: Animalia
- Phylum: Echinodermata
- Class: Asteroidea
- Order: Valvatida
- Family: Goniasteridae
- Genus: Anthenoides
- Species: A. epixanthus

Binomial name
- Anthenoides epixanthus (Fisher, 1906)

Synonyms
- Antheniaster epixanthus Fisher, 1906

Species of sea star

Anthenoides epixanthus is a species of sea star in the family Goniasteridae. It is widely distributed in the Indo-Pacific at depths of 100–600 meters.

== Description ==
The species has a stellate body with pointed arm tips and rounded interradial arcs. The abactinal surface is covered by weakly developed bosses to granules. A dermis covers the body surface. Marginal spines are absent. Pedicellariae are absent from all but the adambulacral plate surface.

== Distribution and habitat ==
This species has a wide Indo-Pacific distribution, recorded from Easter Island, Hawaiian Islands, Japan, New South Wales (Australia), Papua New Guinea, the Bismarck Sea, New Zealand, and New Caledonia. Depth range is 100 to 600 meters. In New Caledonia, it is found at 398–463 meters.
