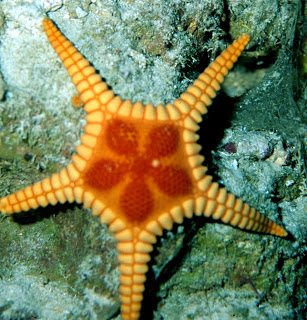
- Glyphodiscus magnificus

Scientific classification
- Kingdom: Animalia
- Phylum: Echinodermata
- Class: Asteroidea
- Order: Valvatida
- Family: Goniasteridae
- Genus: Glyphodiscus; Fisher, 1917

= Glyphodiscus =

Genus of starfishes

Glyphodiscus (from Ancient Greek γλύφω (glúpho), meaning "carving", and δίσκος (dískos), meaning "disc") is a genus of sea stars belonging to the family Goniasteridae.

The species of this genus are found in Malesia and Australia.

Species:

- Glyphodiscus magnificus Mah, 2005
- Glyphodiscus pentagonalis Mah, 2005
- Glyphodiscus perierctus (Fisher, 1913)
