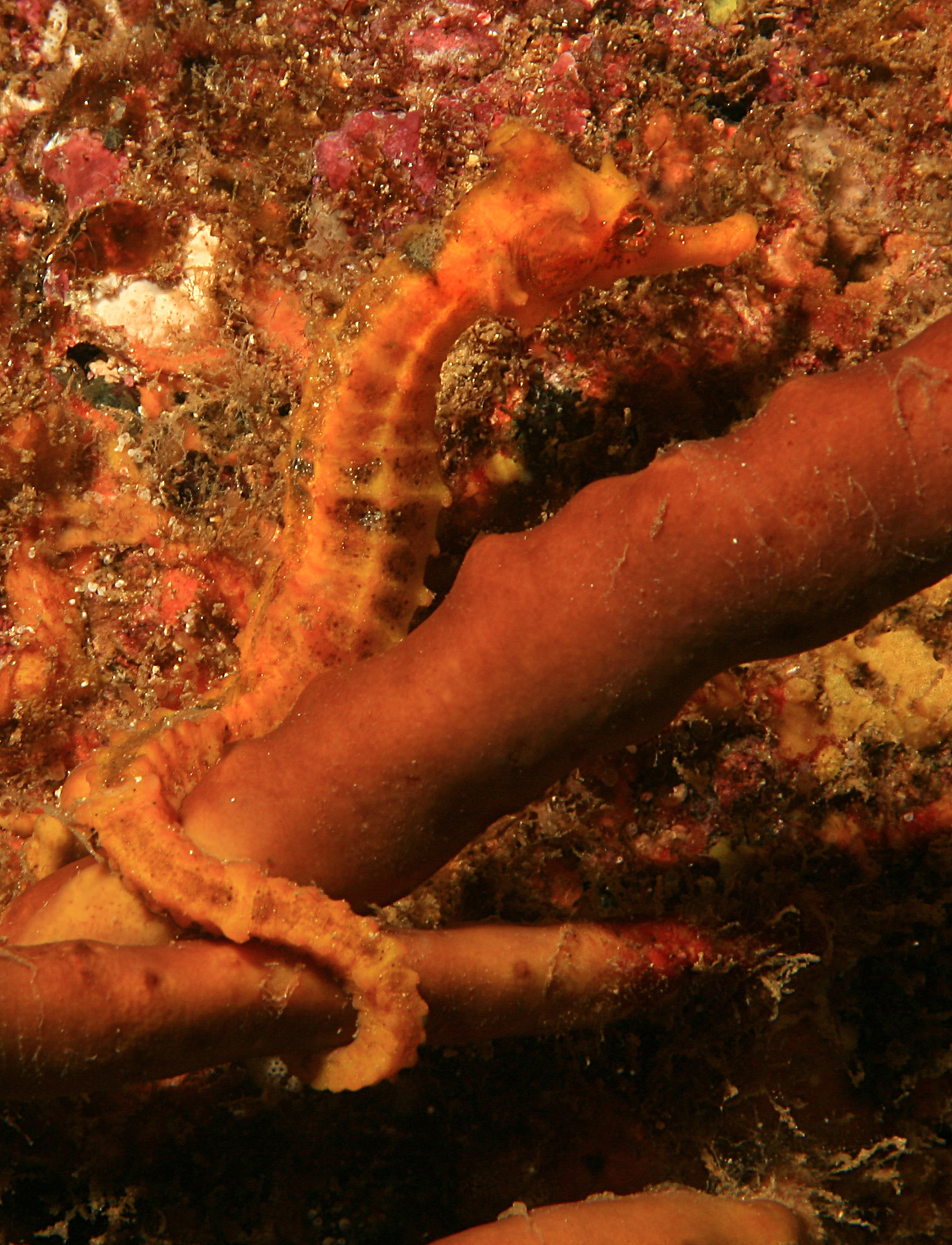

Conservation status
- Vulnerable (IUCN 3.1)
- CITES Appendix II

Scientific classification
- Kingdom: Animalia
- Phylum: Chordata
- Class: Actinopterygii
- Division: Teleostei
- Order: Syngnathiformes
- Family: Syngnathidae
- Genus: Hippocampus
- Species: H. ingens

Binomial name
- Hippocampus ingens Girard, 1859

Synonyms
- Hippocampus ecuadorensis Fowler, 1922; Hippocampus gracilis Gill, 1862; Hippocampus hildebrandi Ginsburg, 1933

= Pacific seahorse =

Species of fish

The Pacific seahorse, also known as the giant seahorse, (Hippocampus ingens) is a species of fish in the family Syngnathidae. Their genus name (Hippocampus) is derived from the Greek word hippos, which means "horse" and campus, which means "sea monster." This species is the only seahorse species found in the eastern Pacific Ocean.

== Description ==
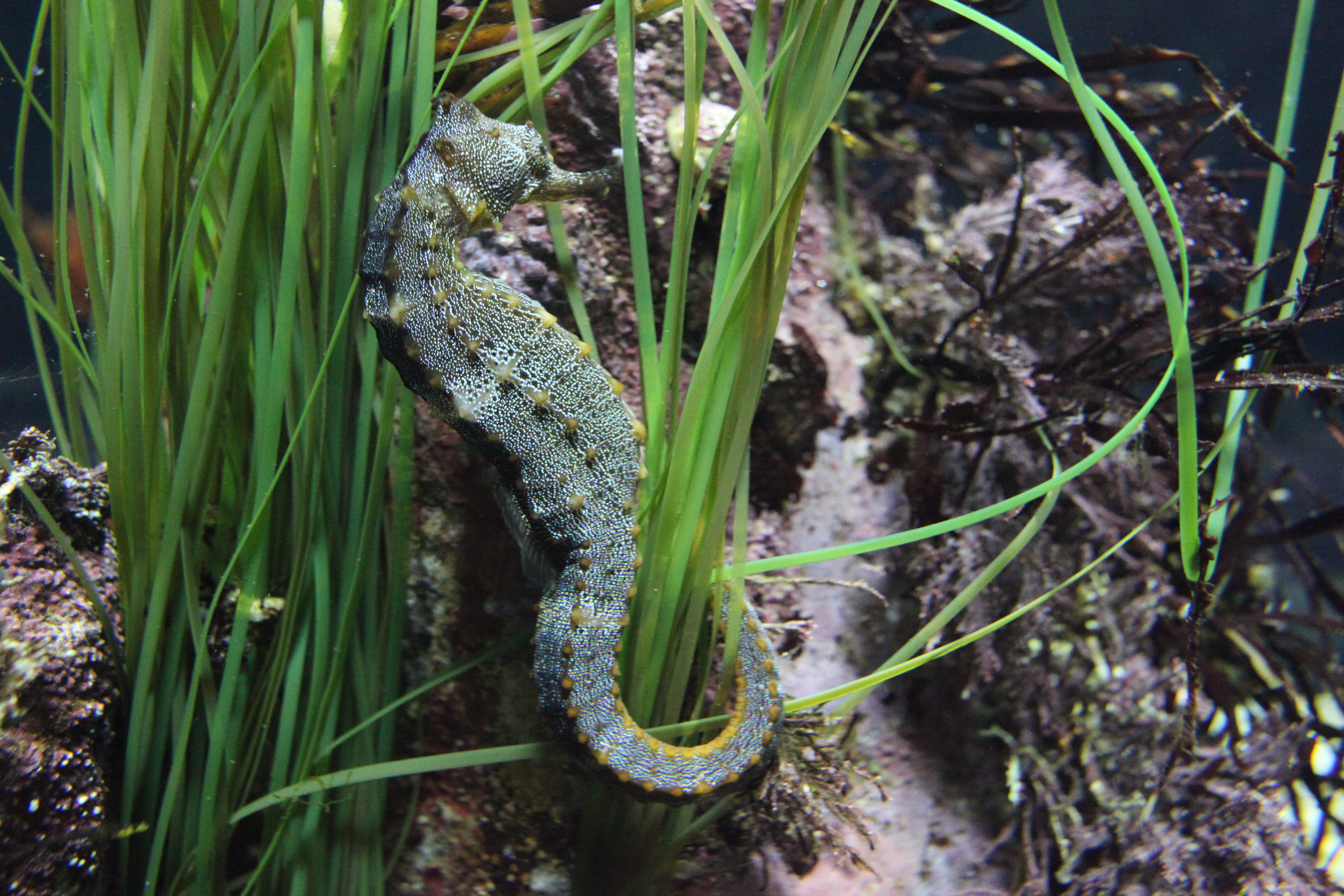
A pacific seahorse anchoring itself in eelgrass.

Hippocampus ingens are one of the largest seahorses, with adult pacific seahorses ranging in size from 12 to 19 centimetres (4.7 to 7.5 in) in height, with a maximum known size of 30 centimetres (12 in). Offspring are approximately 9 mm after birth. While large compared to others of their kind, their size hinders them in the conservation world. Minimum size limits are a common and favored conservation tool, usually starting at 10 cm. Thus, it is crucial that Pacific seahorses are accurately measured when they reach sexual maturity, for it determines if they will be protected or not.

Pacific seahorses can be a variety of colors, including green, brown, maroon, grey, and yellow. Males can be distinguished from females by their prominent keel.

Pacific seahorses share the common traits of seahorses, including a prehensile tail used for anchoring, skin instead of scales, a digestive tract without a distinct stomach, no teeth, and the ability to move each eye independently. It is one of the six species listed as "under the greatest threat from unsustainable levels of harvest and international trade" by the Convention on International Trade in Endangered Species of Wild Fauna (CITES).

== Distribution and habitat ==
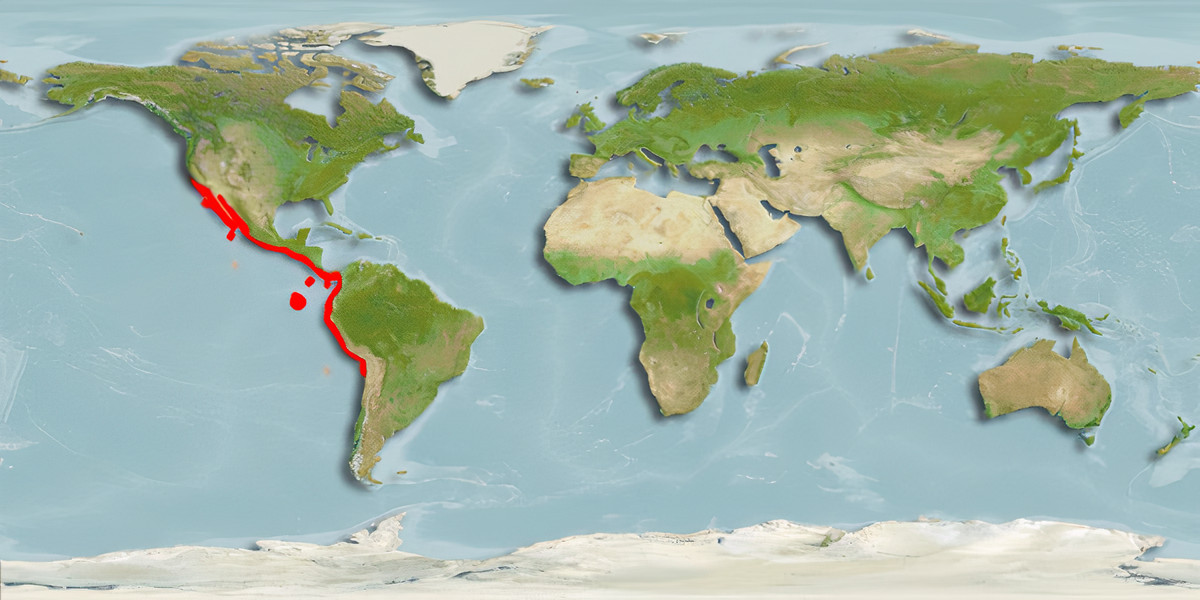
Range of the Pacific seahorse

The pacific seahorse is distributed in the Pacific Ocean from Baja California to Chile, with an additional transient population off of San Diego.The only known oceanic island population occurs around the Galapagos Islands with some additional populations also located in Northern Peru.

Pacific seahorses are nocturnal and known to inhabit a variety of sub-tidal habitats to a maximum depth of 60 metres (200 ft). Habitats include mangroves, seagrass meadows, rocky reefs, coral reefs and sponges. Other common habitats are sea kelp and eelgrass. They also camouflage around the branches of gorgonians and black corals.

South America specifically is home to an abundance of aquatic ecosystems. As a result, this region is more susceptible to environmental crime and many species such as the Pacific seahorse are affected by this. Furthermore, Peru trades the most pacific seahorses and this environmental crime in this country regarding the species is very high.

The first record of Hippocampus ingens in Guadalupe Island, Mexico, was in November 2015. This is a northern oceanic island, differing from its usual Eastern Pacific locations. The presence of Hippocampus ingens at this new location could be due to the fact that its population is vulnerable as well as long distance dispersal methods, which other seahorse species have recently been doing.

Convention on International Trade in Endangered Species of Wild Fauna (CITES) data did not become available for seahorses until 2004, and thus until then Latin American countries were not thought of to be heavily involved in international seahorse trade. However, it is now known that countries such as Peru and Mexico are some of the greatest culprits of this trade and although the Pacific seahorse is an Eastern Pacific species, its trade and exploitation has gone largely beyond this region.

== Behavior ==
=== Reproduction ===
Female pacific seahorses in captivity have been observed producing small broods at three months of age. Sexually mature females often develop a dark patch below the anal fin. Males reach sexual maturity at around 5.4 centimetres (2.1 in) in height. Unsuccessful reproductive activity in captivity has been noted at around three months of age, with successful pregnancies as early as six months of age.

Like all seahorses, females deposit their eggs in the brood pouch of the male, where they are subsequently fertilized by the male and sealed into the pouch. As the embryos develop, the fluid inside the pouch changes in salinity to acclimate the embryos to the salinity of the surrounding sea water. Research suggests that pacific seahorse males can brood up to 2000 eggs at once, and may brood multiple times in a breeding season. At the end of the fourteen day gestation period, the male goes into labor and must force the young out of the pouch one at a time, which sometimes takes hours.

=== Development ===
Birth marks the end of parental care, as young are born fully self-sufficient. It has been hypothesized that juveniles spend the first few months after birth in the open ocean. This is based on their large juvenile dorsal fin and lack of juvenile anchoring behavior, and not specific field observation.

Although they do not have a stomach, Hippocampus ingens juveniles have a well-developed digestive system. They have good immune function and their intestine does most of the work, for it has a larger area since there is no stomach present. Furthermore, the species has enough enzymes to digest its major nutrients, including those to account for the higher than average lipid requirements.

=== Diet ===
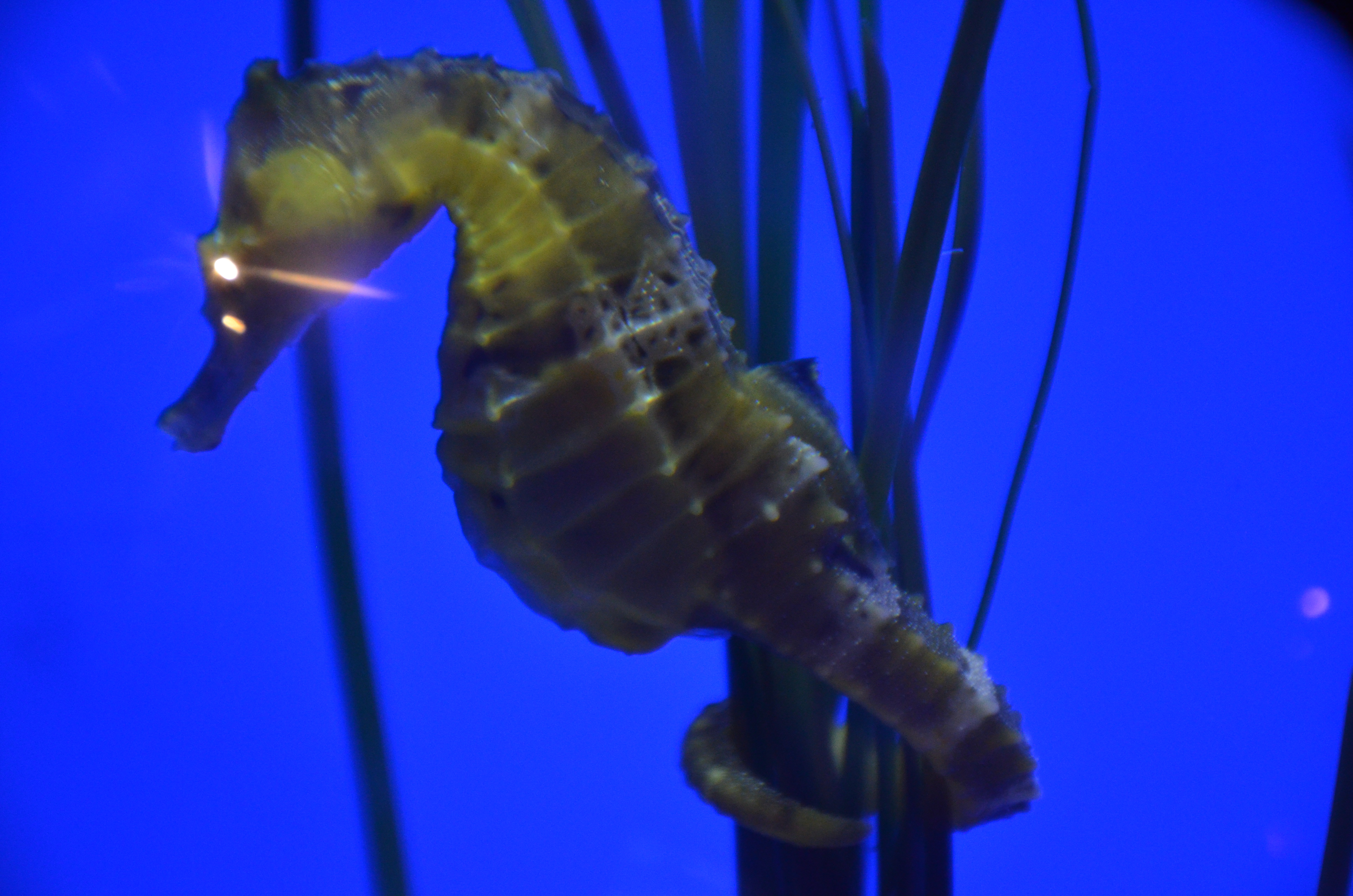
Hippocampus ingens in a tank in the Ripley's Aquarium of Canada.

Hippocampus ingens diet consists of small organisms that live on the bottom of the sea such as mysids, small crustaceans, and other plankton. Like most seahorses, Pacific seahorses are ambush predators, meaning that they camouflage in their habitats and wait for their prey to pass. They then suck their prey in and swallow it whole, for they do not have teeth.

== Evolutionary history ==
Hippocampus ingens have low genetic diversity, which is one of the reasons they are a vulnerable species, and thus it is difficult identify a geographic origin for this species. Researchers are looking into possibly sequencing loci of the species or microsatellite markers to gain more information about the geographic origin of the species and how they are relocating to new locations.

However, it is known that the lineage of seahorses leading to modern pacific seahorses diverged from slender seahorses after the rise of the Isthmus of Panama, between 4 and 5 mya. Pacific seahorses and Fisher's seahorses split from this lineage 2.5 to 3 mya.

Although little research has been conducted regarding the origins of the Hippocampus ingens, one study looked at the histological structure of the species' digestive tract as well as their digestive enzymes and found informative data. The histological structure of their intestine is similar to that of seahorse species that also lack a stomach (agastric teleosts) such as the H. abdomnialis and the H. guttulatus. Thus, these species may have split from each other from a common ancestor, but more than just morphological data would be needed to confirm this observation.

== Conservation status ==
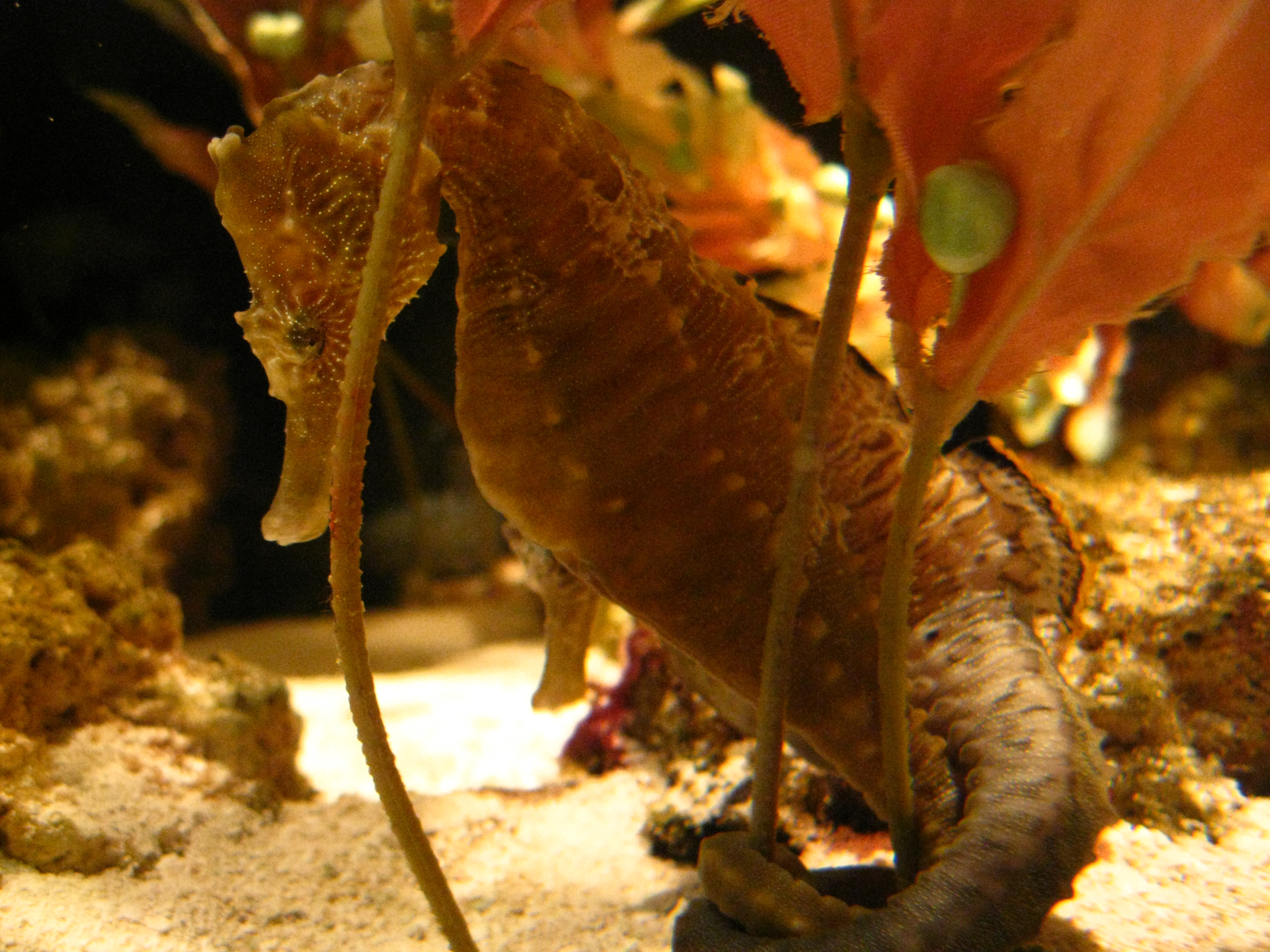
Pacific seahorse in an aquarium.

=== Threats ===
Pacific seahorses face many of the same threats that other seahorses face; over 20 million seahorses are sold each year to be used in Chinese medicine, the aquarium trade, or dried as curios. Mexico and Peru are the largest exporter of pacific seahorses, selling more than 1 dry ton annually. Seahorses are particularly susceptible to over-harvesting due to characteristics such as low fecundity, monogamous mating, long development of embryos, low dispersal ability, and limited geographic distribution. Habitat degradation also poses a threat to Pacific seahorses as humans destroy and pollute their habitats. Commercial fishing also poses as threat to Pacific seahorses as fisherman often catch and kill them in their large fishing nets as bycatch.

Chinese medicine is one of the main risks to the Hippocampus ingens species, thereby making them one of the most vulnerable fish populations in the world. Hippocampus ingens account for the majority of species identified in Chinese medicinal markets around the world in places such as San Francisco's Chinatown. This species specifically is favorable for this industry due to its large size (compared to other seahorses) and smooth texture. Powdered forms of these seahorses are very profitable and thus those who partake in these illegal activities are always finding new ways to conduct their methods. For instance, seahorse powder is not particularly hard to get through customs in many places, for it can be easily disguised as something legal such as plant extract or other substances. These powdered forms are used as "at home remedies" for many common illnesses. For example, some countries mix the powder in various liquids to treat common respiratory illnesses.

Another ways humans exploits seahorses such as the Pacific seahorse is they kill and use them to make crafts and jewelry. Locals will kill seahorses for this reason and sell them to tourists. There are even websites where seahorse products are sold online.

=== Efforts ===
There are some efforts to stop the exploitation of seahorses such as Hippocampus ingens, but little enforcement. For example, in Mexico Hippocampus ingens are listed as a species subject to special protection, but Mexico is still one of the leading contributors to the issue. Additionally, many countries have tried to get legislature involved and implement bans against some of the illegal activity involving the seahorses. For instance, in 2004, the entire genus Hippocampus was included in appendix II of CITES. This action was taken by the Convention on International Trade in Endangered Species of Wild Fauna and Flora and as a result, many countries directly involved in the illegal trade of these species, such as Peru, made more formal bans on it through their legislature. Nonetheless, illegal activity involving the species still continued and confiscation rates were around the same as before the ban was put into place.

Because the main form of the confiscation of these seahorses is powder, chemical identification of the powder would be extremely useful in working towards prevention of illegal trade and trafficking of the species. If a protocol was constructed to determine and identify the powdered substance, then it would be much easier for law officials to track the criminal activity being done and hold those accountable.

Additionally, scientists and researchers are searching for new and innovative ways to combat exploitation of Hippocampus ingens and increase the size of their populations. One study in particular took the angle of possibly trying to cultivate the existing seahorse populations by supplementing their diet. They enriched their diet with different foods in the first months of the Hippocampus ingens' life and saw a significant effect on the seahorses' survival.
