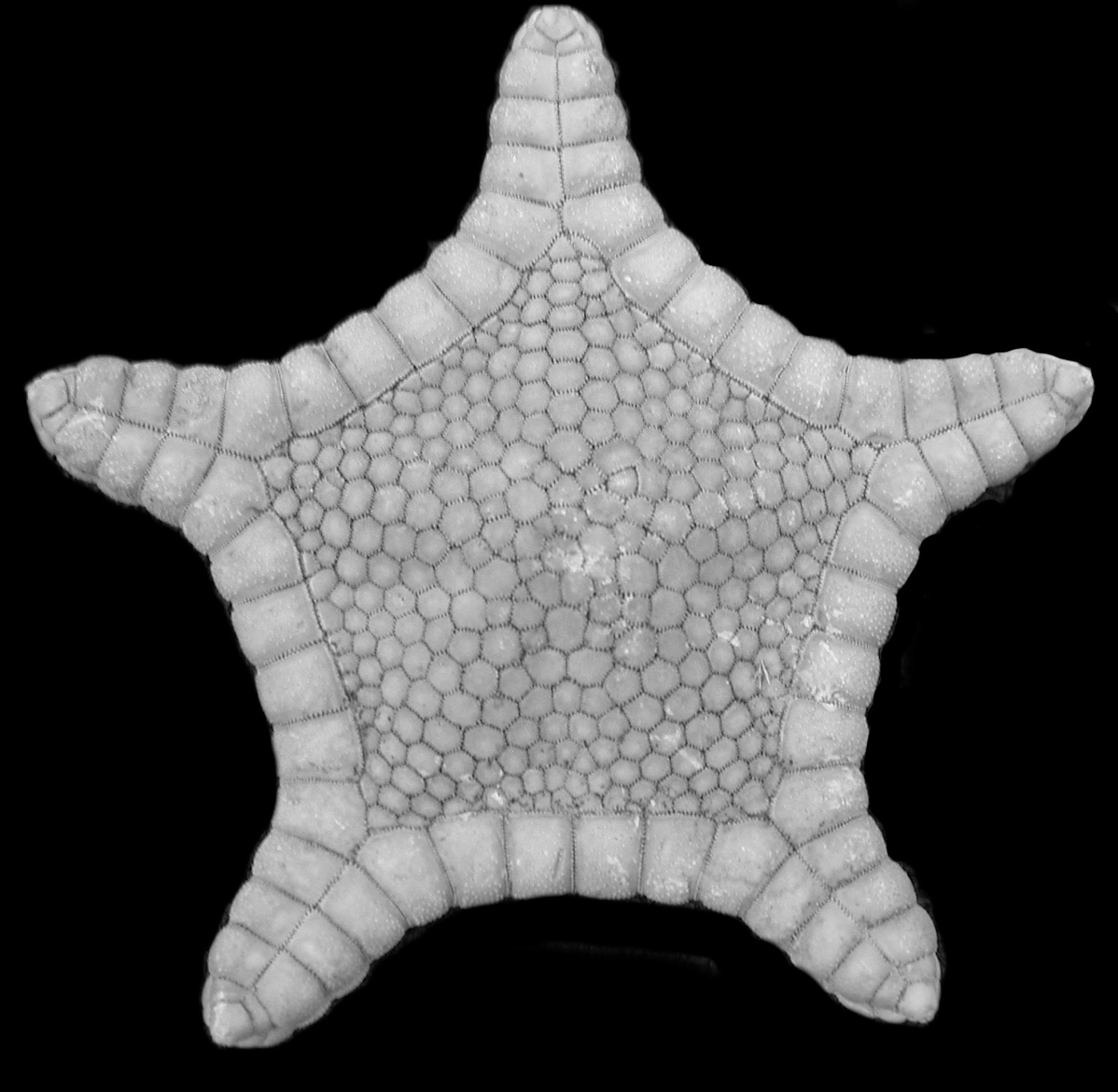
- Astroceramus eldredgei

Scientific classification
- Kingdom: Animalia
- Phylum: Echinodermata
- Class: Asteroidea
- Order: Valvatida
- Family: Goniasteridae
- Genus: Astroceramus; Fisher, 1906

Species
- See text

= Astroceramus =

Genus of starfishes

Astroceramus is a genus of abyssal sea stars in the family Goniasteridae.

== Etymology ==
"Astrocramus" is made up of two Latin root words, "Astrum" which means star, and "ceramo" meaning tile. This clearly tells the shape of the organism; star shaped tile of all its species.

== Species list ==
According to World Register of Marine Species:

- Astroceramus boninensis Kogure & Tachikawa, 2009 – Japan
- Astroceramus brachyactis H.L. Clark, 1941 – Caribbean
- Astroceramus cadessus Macan, 1938
- Astroceramus callimorphus Fisher, 1906 – Hawaii
- Astroceramus cyclus Mah, 2026 – New Caledonia
- Astroceramus denticulatus McKnight, 2006 – New Zealand
- Astroceramus eldredgei Mah, 2015 – Hawaii
- Astroceramus fisheri Koehler, 1909
- Astroceramus lionotus Fisher, 1913 – Philippines
- Astroceramus pernachus Mah, 2026 – New Caledonia
- Astroceramus sphaeriostictus Fisher, 1913 – Philippines
- Astroceramus titthos Mah, 2026 – New Caledonia
