= Battleborn (video game) =

2016 multiplayer first-person shooter video game

- Developer: Gearbox Software
- Publisher: 2K
- Director: Randy Varnell
- Producer: Chris Brock
- Designer: John Mulkey
- Programmers: Neil Johnson; Scott Velasquez; Chase Sensky
- Artist: Scott Kester
- Writer: Aaron Linde
- Composers: Cris Velasco; Kevin Riepl; Mike Rubino
- Engine: Unreal Engine 3
- Platforms: PlayStation 4; Windows; Xbox One
- Release: May 3, 2016
- Genre: First-person shooter
- Modes: Single-player, multiplayer

Battleborn was a free-to-play first-person shooter video game developed by Gearbox Software and published by 2K for PlayStation 4, Windows, and Xbox One. The game was released worldwide on May 3, 2016.

Battleborn was a hero shooter with elements of multiplayer online battle arenas (MOBA). Players would have selected one of several pre-designed characters with different attacks and skills and participated in either single player matches or competitive matches with other players. During matches, players gained experience to advance their character along the Helix Tree, selecting from one of two new abilities or buffs with each advancement step that allows the player to create a custom loadout for that character for the duration of that match. Furthermore, as the player completed matches, they earned randomized gear (generated similarly to the Borderlands series' randomized weapon feature) that can also be equipped as part of the loadout to provide further buffs and abilities or purchased through microtransactions.

The game received mixed reviews upon release, with reviewers citing on the difficulties of learning the complex gameplay systems as being ultimately deep and rewarding but off-putting to new players. Battleborn was overshadowed by Blizzard Entertainment's Overwatch, another hero shooter, that was released a few weeks later and which caused a large drop in Battleborn's player count within the month. In response, Gearbox made adjustments in pricing and downloadable content to try to draw new players to the game. In June 2017, it was transitioned to a pricing scheme comparable to a free-to-play title.

Gearbox announced a year-long phased shutdown of the game's servers by January 31, 2021, with the game removed from sale in November 2019 and planned shutting down of in-game purchases by February 2020.

== Gameplay ==
Battleborn is described as a hero shooter, primarily a first-person shooter incorporating multiplayer online battle arena elements. In any of the game's modes, the player selects from one of several pre-defined hero characters that they have available, each with their own unique attributes, attacks, powers and skills, which can include casting magic and area-of-effect attacks. During character selection, the player also selects a loadout that can have up to three pieces of gear to bring into a match, earned from previous matches. Each piece requires a number of shards, in-game currency collected during a match, to activate during a match, and once activated, stay active for the remainder of the match. This equipment can boost or detract from base attributes or give additional benefits to the character. Shards can also be used to activate special turrets on maps to strategically defend points.

The hero's base combat level starts at 1 at the start of a round, and as the player defeat enemies and complete other objectives, they will gain experience towards further levels. With each new level, the player can then select one of two or more perks specific to that character along that character's "Helix Tree", including unlocking the character's strongest "ultimate ability". These experience levels only apply within the current match and reset on the start of a new match.

In Battleborn's meta-game, both the player's "command level" (applying across all characters for a given player) and a character-specific level can be increased based on performance in matches. In this meta-game, new character levels will unlock new perks that can be selected on the Helix Tree, alternative outfits, and other cosmetic improvements. Higher command levels will unlock additional characters that the player can select from, among other benefits. New gear is earned as loot drops from the completion of a match, or through picking up loot during a match, or may be purchased in special loot chests using in-game coins earned from playing matches or from gaining command levels. The player can only store a limited number of pieces of equipment, but can sell unneeded equipment for coins to apply at the meta-game. Battleborn requires a constant Internet connection to play due to the game's meta-game features.

The game features 25 playable characters upon release and later added 5 downloadable content characters, with each having different abilities and weapons; characters are broadly categorized based on their movement speed and agility, combat range and effectiveness, and the difficulty of playing the character. For example, Rath is a melee-based character who is equipped with a katana, while Thorn is a long-ranged character, whose primary weapon is a bow. Characters of supporting role, such as Miko, who specializes in healing other characters of the same team, are also playable. During first time after game's release not all characters were available when the player starts the game, they were unlocked for play by completing both missions and multiplayer games, or raising player's command rank. Starting from big update from February 2017, all 25 base game characters become available to play right after tutorial story mission. After "Free Trial" update in June 2017 access to all base game heroes in free version now given after purchasing "Full Game update", along with all Story missions, otherwise they could be purchased separately in Marketplace.

Battleborn includes a story-based mission mode that enables five players to cooperate to complete various missions that include objective-driven narratives used as backstory for some of the hero characters. The additional 5-story missions are called Story Operations and were added as DLC; their main differences from main story mode are earning of OPs points, which gives player various rewards depending on chosen character and increases mission's difficulty, and changing of dialogues of main non-playable characters, which fully reveals story's narrative on 10th playthrough.

There are also three main multiplayer modes in the game that pit two teams of five players each against each other (or against a team of artificial intelligence controlled heroes):

- Meltdown, a mode where the team should escort and sacrifice AI controlled robots while killing robots of enemy team;
- Incursion, a mode similar to most MOBAs where teams have to take the opponents' base while protecting their own base;
- Capture, a mode where teams vie to seize and hold several control points on a map.

The other two later added multiplayer modes are:

- Face-off, a mode where the main objective is hoarding masks of AI controlled Varelsi mobs, the team that deposits most masks for a given time or score limit wins;
- Supercharge, which unlike other modes feature 3v3 teams and in fact is a slightly different version of Meltdown mode with a second main objective being capture of advantage giving Supercharge pad.

Battleborn initially did not support microtransactions, and it was only introduced in a June 2016 update. Players could use real money to obtain in-game credits that could be spent on skins and taunts for the various characters (some which can already be earned through advancement with the character), but otherwise has no direct influence on gameplay. Gearbox planned to release downloadable content that would include new skins and taunts for existing characters prior to announcement of the game's shutdown.

== Story ==
=== Setting ===
Battleborn is set in a space fantasy setting, in which every species fled to a star known as Solus after a disastrous event destroyed most other planets and stars in the universe. These species are divided into different factions upon their arrivals, and eventually they united and cooperate with each other by sending out the best fighters, who are labelled as Battleborn, to fight against Varelsi, the origin of the catastrophe.

=== Plot ===
After the leader of the Jennerit Imperium Lothar Rendain started a rampage of destroying all the stars in the universe, the captain of the UPR (United Peacekeeping Republics) Trevor Ghalt formed a coalition in order to save the last star, Solus. The first mission forces the player to play as Mellka, an Eldrid operative who is ordered to rendezvous with Deande, a former Jennerit assassin. During this mission, Rendain offers Deande one last chance to prove her loyalty to him, but she refused. After this mission, the player is allowed to use any of the Battleborn for the next mission, which requires you to defeat ISIC, to make him an ally. In the third mission, the player has to escort an M7 Super Sentry and kill the Varelsi Conservator.

== Development ==
Battleborn was announced by Gearbox Software and 2K Games and revealed by Game Informer on July 8, 2014. It is the first original game developed by Gearbox Software since the release of Borderlands in 2009, and is also claimed to be "the most ambitious video game that Gearbox has ever created" and a "genre-fused" video game by Gearbox Software's president, Randy Pitchford.

In a 2017 interview, Pitchford said that prior to Battleborn's development, the principle way to market and promote first-person shooters was to emphasise what abilities the player-character had, which made elements like a detailed game world or narrative a secondary consideration. This led to them thinking about creating a game with "a wide spectrum" of characters and abilities which then could be used in large-player game modes. Pitchford recognized that they already had experience creating a diverse array of characters through the Borderlands series, and that this roster of heroes approach was gaining popularity in multiplayer online battle arenas. With Battleborn, Pitchford wanted to take the combination of first-person shooter and role-playing elements they had from Borderlands, and mix in the range of heroes as to create a new genre, what has become known as the "hero shooter".

Several gameplay elements from Brothers in Arms: Furious 4, another project from Gearbox which was cancelled in July 2015, were transferred to the game. A closed technical test for this game, which allows Gearbox to test the multiplayer servers and alter the balance between characters, was held on October 29, 2015. A beta for the game was released on April 8, 2016. It came to the PlayStation 4 first before other platforms. Battleborn's PC open beta began on April 13, 2016 and lasted until April 18, 2016. Players were able to participate in both story mode and two competitive multiplayer modes: Incursion and Meltdown. More than two million players participated in the beta. The game was set to be released worldwide for PlayStation 4, Windows, Xbox One on February 9, 2016, but was later delayed to May 3, 2016.

The game's graphics are inspired by computer-generated imagery like the movies produced by Pixar, as well as anime. When creating the game's 2D graphics, the team hired Michel Gagné to work on the 2D effects of the game's maps and characters' abilities. The team also drew inspirations from a variety of fighting games, multiplayer online battle arena games, role-playing games and toys from the 1980s.

In addition to the standard version, players can purchase the Digital Deluxe Edition, which includes the game's Season Pass and cosmetic items. Five additional characters are set to be released for the game upon release for free, and five different paid packs, which includes additional story content, are also scheduled to be released after the game's launch.

Rumors surrounding the game turning free-to-play started to circulate around the internet, but Gearbox president Randy Pitchford declined any plans of turning the game free-to-play, although he did mention ideas of releasing a free "trial version".

On October 3, 2016 2K Games announced the addition of a competitive game mode called Face-Off, to be released for free to all players who own Battleborn on October 13, 2016. The game mode launched alongside the first downloadable content Story Operation, titled "Attikus and the Thrall Rebellion".

In June 2017, the game was updated to add support in for its "Free Trial" mode. This mode effectively makes the game a free-to-play title; at no cost, players can download the game, play a rotating selection of the game's heroes in any of the game's public multiplayer modes, and earn in-game currency towards permanently unlocking other characters and upgrades; the Free Trial does not include the game's story missions, nor allows these players to set up or participate in private matches. Players that already owned the game are designated as "Founders" and were given in-game rewards. Players still can purchase the game, unlocking most of the roster of characters and gaining access to private and story-based game modes.

== Reception ==
Reception

Aggregate score
Aggregator	Score
Metacritic	PC: 69/100; PS4: 68/100; XONE: 71/100

Review scores
Publication	Score
Destructoid	6/10
Electronic Gaming Monthly	7.5/10
Game Informer	6/10
GameRevolution	4.5/5
GameSpot	7/10
GamesRadar+	3.5/5
IGN	7.1/10
PC Gamer (US)	72/100
Polygon	7.5/10
Hardcore Gamer	4.5/5
PlayStation LifeStyle	8/10

Edit on Wikidata

Battleborn received "mixed or average" reviews, according to video game review aggregator Metacritic.

Destructoid awarded it a score of 6 out of 10, saying that the game is "Slightly above average or simply inoffensive. Fans of the genre should enjoy this game, but a fair few will be left unfulfilled." GameSpot awarded it a score of 7 out of 10, saying "With so many moving parts that never quite gel, I found plenty of things to love but just as much to feel confused by and ambivalent about." IGN awarded it a score of 7.1 out of 10, saying "Battleborn's fun heroes and leveling will keep you hooked despite a lack of content." Hardcore Gamer awarded it a score of 4.5 out of 5, saying "Battleborn has done what I would have previously thought was impossible: it has kept me interested in its multiplayer. I typically grow bored with adversarial multiplayer after about an hour or two, yet I have spent so much time with this title already and want to keep going." PlayStation LifeStyle awarded it a score of 8 out of 10, saying "If Borderlands and the MOBA genre could have a baby, I imagine it would look something like Battleborn. Gearbox Software’s signature style shines here, even if the humor falls flat most of the time"

In looking back at the game a year after its release, Destructoid's Darren Nakamura felt Battleborn was an excellent game once a player had put time to acquire a larger number of playable characters to select from, and had amassed gear that created unique and powerful loadouts for specific characters, but a player would need to work through tens to hundreds of hours of gameplay to acquire these elements, making it off-putting to new players.

Battleborn was the best selling retail game in its week of release in the UK. It fell, however, to being the 12th best selling retail game in the UK the next week. According to director Randy Varnell, the launch week sales of the game is similar to that of the first Borderlands, which had gone on to sell over 7.8 million units. It was the fourth highest-selling game in the United States for May 2016 according to NPD Group. It has grossed $18 million.

=== Decline and shutdown ===
The game's player base quickly declined after release, primarily due to the release of another hero shooter, Overwatch by Blizzard Entertainment, on May 24, 2016. Gearbox had already been developing Battleborn and had fixed their expected release date when Blizzard announced Overwatch for release within a few weeks of Battleborn. Though they had considered trying to change the release date as Blizzard had a larger promotional budget that could easily overwhelm 2K Games, Pitchford opted to stay to what they planned and instead make sure the game's release went smoothly and to highlight how Battleborn differed from Overwatch. In a September 2017 interview, Pitchford believed that the fallout in sales from Battleborn was not necessarily due to the presence of Overwatch, but that people had made comparisons between the two games which reflected negatively on Battleborn and cost them sales.

By July 2016, the number of concurrent players on PC had dropped below 1000, compared to more than 12,000 at the launch of the game, and Destructoid reported that at the game's first anniversary, the number of concurrent players sometimes dropped below 100 during off-peak hours, making it difficult to launch a match. Although Take-Two revealed that the game did not meet their sales expectations, 2K announced their intention to continue to support the game through add-on content and virtual currency. An industry rumour in September 2016 suggested that the game would soon switch to a free to play model, which would follow a similar path that 2K Games' Evolve had done in July 2016 and subsequently saw an increase in player base size. This rumor was later refuted by Gearbox president Randy Pitchford. Pitchford claimed they have seen 3 million unique players across all systems and that "we're okay. I'm not freaking out. We're fine." in terms of sales. On June 6, 2017, Battleborn released a patch that introduced the "Free Trial" of the game, effectively changing the game to a free-to-play model despite Pitchford's comments. This introduced several changes to the game, such as a character rotation, a founder's pack, as well as unlockable characters and cosmetics.

By September 2017, Gearbox announced that after the release of the game's final update, released on October 23, 2017, their support for the title would enter "maintenance mode", effectively shutting down any further development but keeping a skeleton team to maintain the game's servers and fix any critical bugs that may be found. Gearbox announced in November 2019 that the game's servers will permanently shut down by January 2021, rendering the game unplayable. As part of the closeout of the game, the game was removed from sale from digital storefronts and Gearbox announced plans to disable the in-game store in February 2020. Originally scheduled for January 25, 2021, the server shutdown occurred on January 31, after which the game became unplayable.

A user-driven project, Battleborn Reborn, has been able to bring back the single-player components of Battleborn through unofficial modding by November 2023. The team behind the project anticipates developing support for the player-versus-player content in the future.
