= Amy Tucker (game designer) =

American game designer

Amy Tucker invented Xeko and established Matter Group after 12 years in high-tech and custom publishing, where she designed integrated-media programs for companies including Microsoft, Nintendo, and T-Mobile. As vice president of strategic development at Fluent Communications, Tucker crafted programs that included Microsoft’s first consumer e-commerce engine, Nintendo’s Pokémon website, and T-Mobile’s mobile content program.

In 2004, Tucker took time off to travel and research, turning her creative vision and experience toward advancement in global sustainability, where she seeks to influence individuals, businesses, and policy makers in ways that support the long-term health of our planet. In 2005 Tucker founded Matter Group, an incubator for sustainability advancements, with close friend and business maven Sönny Spearman.

A world traveler, artist, yogini, and snowboarder, Tucker serves on the Seattle Art Museum’s Contemporary Art Executive Council and guest teaches at Seattle's School of Visual Concepts. She is the singer and songwriter for Future Factory, a Seattle folk-punk band. A Boettcher Scholar, Tucker graduated magna cum laude from Colorado College.
