= Anthenoides cristatus =

Scientific classification
- Kingdom: Animalia
- Phylum: Echinodermata
- Class: Asteroidea
- Order: Valvatida
- Family: Goniasteridae
- Genus: Anthenoides
- Species: A. cristatus

Binomial name
- Anthenoides cristatus (Sladen, 1889)

Synonyms
- Leptogonaster cristatus Sladen, 1889; Anthenoides sarissa Alcock, 1893; Anthenoides tenuis Liao & A.M. Clark, 1989

Species of sea star

Anthenoides cristatus is a species of sea star in the family Goniasteridae widely distributed in the Indo-Pacific at depths of 134–1350 meters.

== Taxonomy and systematics ==
The species was originally described as Leptogonaster cristatus by Sladen in 1889. Anthenoides tenuis Liao & A.M. Clark, 1989 is considered a junior synonym of A. cristatus, as both share short, conical spines on the inferomarginal plates and a range of 4–7 furrow spines.

== Description ==
The species has a stellate body with triangular arms and weakly curved interradial arcs. The abactinal surface is composed of polygonal plates covered by a dermis and round to irregular granules, especially distally adjacent to the superomarginal plates. Abactinal, forceps-like pedicellariae are present. Superomarginal plates are covered by dermis and are abutted distally approximately 4 to 6 plates from the terminus. Inferomarginal spines are present, especially on proximal plates. The actinal regions are covered by dermis with sparse granules. Furrow spines number 4 to 7, are widely spaced, and are blunt with pointed tips. Subambulacral spines number 2 to 3, are short (approximately half the height of the furrow spines), and are accompanied by tong-like pedicellariae, especially proximally.

== Human use ==
Specimens consistent with this species have been identified as an ingredient in dried Asian commercial soup mixes. Dried specimens were purchased from a market in San Francisco (California), sold by a Chinese company.

== Distribution and habitat ==
This species has a wide Indo-Pacific distribution, recorded from the Gulf of Aden, Philippines, Indonesia, Papua New Guinea, the Solomon Sea, Marquesas Islands, South China Sea, New Zealand, and New Caledonia. Depth range is 134 to 1350 meters. In New Caledonia, it is found at 289–510 meters.
