= Michel Gagné =

Canadian cartoonist

Michel Gagné (born 1965, Roberval, Quebec) is a Canadian cartoonist.

== Film ==
Gagné studied classical animation at Sheridan College and worked for Sullivan Bluth Studios for six years, working on such films as An American Tail, The Land Before Time, All Dogs Go to Heaven, Rock-A-Doodle and A Troll in Central Park. While at Bluth's company, Gagné worked on his own short film, Prelude to Eden, which was nominated for an Annie Award in 1996.

After leaving Bluth, Gagné moved around and eventually settled at Warner Bros.' animation studio, where he worked on such films as Quest for Camelot, The Iron Giant and Osmosis Jones. More recently, Gagné designed the special effects for the Cartoon Network series Star Wars: Clone Wars. He has also occasionally worked for Disney and Pixar. His short film, "Sensology", was short listed for an Academy Award in 2010.

His graphic novel, The Saga of Rex, is currently being adapted into an animated feature-length film by Gagné himself. On August 21, 2026, he said the animation was done and only the sound design remained, expecting it to be completed by the end of the year.

== Insanely Twisted Shadow Planet ==
Gagné has also finished his first video game, Insanely Twisted Shadow Planet, a 2D side-scrolling shooter game which was released August 3, 2011 on Xbox Live Arcade as part of the XBLA Summer of Arcade promotion.

== Published work ==
Gagné has made a name for himself in comics and illustrated fiction. His first book, A Search for Meaning: The Story of Rex, was self-published in 1998. Several more books followed. Gagné also created a Batman story, Batman: Spore, which was serialized in Detective Comics #776-780 (January–May 2003). His comic story, The Saga of Rex was serialized in the comics anthology Flight volume 2-7 (2005-2010), and later collected as a complete graphic novel, published by Image Comics in October 2010. He has produced a 10-issue comic book series, ZED (2001-2013), which was collected and published by Image Comics in 2013 as, ZED: A Cosmic Tale. He is known for his work as an artist for the card game Xeko.

== Awards ==
- 2013 - Eisner Award (nomination): Best Comic Book Archival Project (Young Romance: The Best of Simon & Kirby's Romance Comics)
- 2012 - BAFTA: Best Debut Game (Insanely Twisted Shadow Planet)
- 2012 - Annie Award: Best Animated Video Game (Insanely Twisted Shadow Planet)
- 2012 - Interactive Achievement Awards (nomination): Best Downloadable Game (Insanely Twisted Shadow Planet)
- 2012 - Spike Video Game Awards (nomination): Best Downloadable Game (Insanely Twisted Shadow Planet)
- 2011 - Punto y Raya Festival: Third Prize (Sensology)
- 2011 - Chester Award: Best Experimental/Art Film (Sensology)
- 2009 - Joe Shuster Award (nomination): Outstanding Canadian Comic Book Cartoonist (The Saga of Rex - Flight 5)
- 2007 - Joe Shuster Award (nomination): Outstanding Canadian Comic Book Cartoonist (The Saga of Rex - Flight 3)
- 2007 - Best in the SW Award: Best of Show/Best Animation/Best Interstitial (Insanely Twisted Shadow Puppets)
- 2001 - Annie Award (nomination): Outstanding Individual Achievement in Effects Animation (Osmosis Jones)
- 1999 - Annie Award (nomination): Outstanding Individual Achievement in Effects Animation (The Iron Giant)
- 1998 - Annie Award (nomination): Outstanding Individual Achievement in Effects Animation (The Quest For Camelot)
- 1996 - Annie Award (nomination): Outstanding Achievement in an Animated Short Subject (Prelude To Eden)

== Filmography ==
- TBA - The Saga of Rex (Director/Producer/Animator)
- TBA - Magic: The Gathering (Visual Effects Development)
- 2026 - Ray Gunn (VFX Lead Designer/Animator)
- 2024 - Piece by Piece (2D Special Effects Designer/Animator)
- 2024 - The Tiger's Apprentice (Visual Effects Development)
- 2023 - Dora and the Fantastical Creatures (VFX Designer/Animator)
- 2022 - East Mode With Nigel Ng (Taste Visualization Designer/Animator)
- 2021 - The Meme Animators Movie (Special Effects Lead)
- 2021 - Space Jam: A New Legacy (2D Special Effects Designer and Lead Animator)
- 2019 - The Unikitty Movie (Special Effects Lead)
- 2018 - Spider-Man: Into the Spider-Verse (Visual Development)
- 2017 - My Little Pony: The Movie (Special Effects Lead)
- 2016 - Battleborn (Visual Effects Director)
- 2014 - Synesthesia (Co-Producer/Director/Animator)
- 2013 - The Saga of Rex Part 1: Abduction (Proof-of-concept teaser) (Producer/Director/Animator)
- 2012 - Brave (Development Artist)
- 2010 - Sensology (Producer/Director/Animator)
- 2008 - Horton Hears a Who! (Special Effects Animator)
- 2007 - Ratatouille (Taste Visualization Designer/Animator)
- 2005 - Insanely Twisted Shadow Puppets (Creator/Director/Producer)
- 2005 - The X's (Special Effects Animator)
- 2005 - The Life and Times of Juniper Lee (Character Designs)
- 2004 - The Incredibles (Special Effects Consultant - uncredited)
- 2003 - Star Wars: Clone Wars (Special Effects Designer)
- 2002 - The Powerpuff Girls Movie (Special Effects Animator/Designer)
- 2002 - Scooby-Doo (Conceptual Effects Animation)
- 2001 - Osmosis Jones (Head of 2D Special Effects/Title Sequence)
- 1999 - The Iron Giant (Special Effects Animator/Supervisor)
- 1998 - Quest for Camelot (Head of Special Effects Animation)
- 1996 - Space Jam (Additional Effects Animation - uncredited)
- 1995 - Prelude to Eden (Producer/Director/Animator)
- 1995 - Mortal Kombat (Special Effects Animator)
- 1995 - Vampire in Brooklyn (Special Effects Animator)
- 1995 - Destiny Turns on the Radio (Special Effects Animator)
- 1995 - Animated Stories from the New Testament (Special Effects Animator)
- 1994 - The Swan Princess (Head of Special Effects Animation)
- 1994 - A Troll in Central Park (Special Effects Animator)
- 1993 - Animated Stories from the Bible (Special Effects Animator)
- 1993 - Animated Hero Classics (Special Effects Animator)
- 1993 - Demolition Man (Special Effects Animator)
- 1993 - Thumbelina (Special Effects Animator)
- 1992 - Rock-a-Doodle (Special Effects Animator)
- 1991 - Rover Dangerfield (Special Effects Animator)
- 1989 - All Dogs Go to Heaven (Character Animator)
- 1988 - The Land Before Time (Character Animator)
- 1986 - An American Tail (Assistant Character Animator - uncredited)
- 1986 - A Touch of Deceit (Student Film Producer / Director / Animator)
- 1985 - For Better or for Worse: The Bestest Present (Animator)

== Bibliography ==
- 2014 - Young Romance 2: The Early Simon and Kirby's Romance Comics (Editor)
- 2013 - Explorer: The Lost Islands (Contributor)
- 2013 - ZED: A Cosmic Tale
- 2012 - Young Romance: The Best of Simon and Kirby's Romance Comics (Editor and Restoration)
- 2010 - The Saga of Rex
- 2010 - Flight: Volume 7 (Contributor)
- 2009 - Elemental Magic: The Art of Special Effects Animation (Introduction)
- 2009 - Flight: Volume 6 (Contributor)
- 2008 - Wildlife from the Hotspots
- 2008 - Flight: Volume 5 (Contributor)
- 2007 - Flight: Volume 4 (Contributor)
- 2006 - Flight: Volume 3 (Contributor)
- 2008 - Flight: Volume 2 (Contributor)
- 2005 - Odd Numbers
- 2004 - Freaky Flora: From A to Z
- 2004 - Parables: An Anthology
- 2003 - Batman: Spore / Detective Comics #776-780 (Story and Art)
- 2003 - The Towers of Numar
- 2002 - A Search for Meaning: The Story of Rex (Color Edition)
- 2002 - Frenzied Fauna: From A to Z
- 2001 - Insanely Twisted Rabbits
- 2000 - The Bird, the Spider and the Octopus
- 2000 - The Great Shadow Migration
- 1999 - The Mystery of He
- 1998 - A Search for Meaning: The Story of Rex
