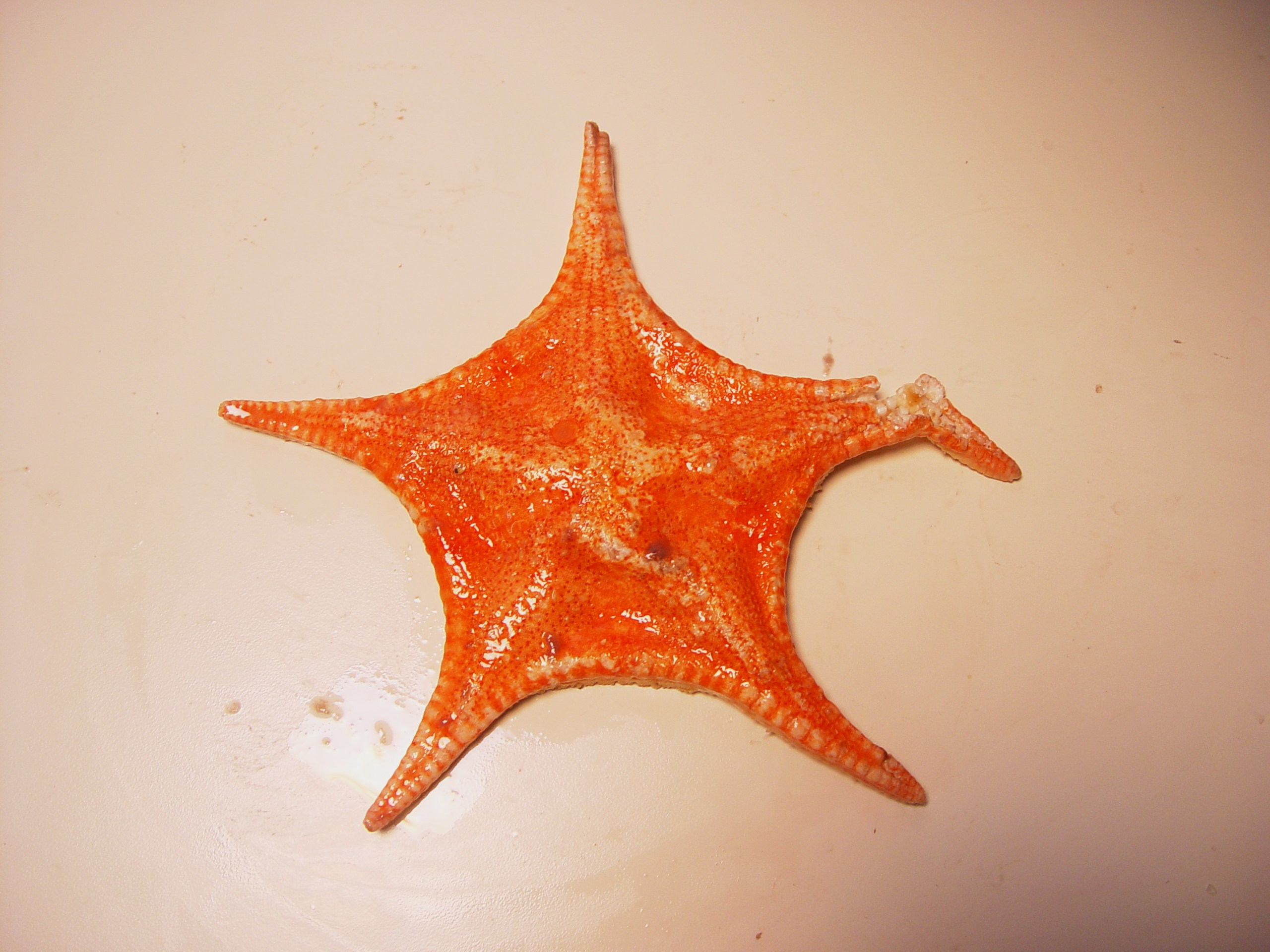
- Anthenoides peircei

Scientific classification
- Kingdom: Animalia
- Phylum: Echinodermata
- Class: Asteroidea
- Order: Valvatida
- Family: Goniasteridae
- Genus: Anthenoides; Perrier, 1881

= Anthenoides =

Genus of starfishes

Anthenoides is a genus of echinoderms belonging to the family Goniasteridae.

The genus has almost cosmopolitan distribution.

Species:

- Anthenoides cristatus (Sladen, 1889)
- Anthenoides dubius H.L. Clark, 1938
- Anthenoides epixanthus (Fisher, 1906)
- Anthenoides granulosus Fisher, 1913
- Anthenoides laevigatus Liao & A.M.Clark, 1989
- Anthenoides lithosorus Fisher, 1913
- Anthenoides marleyi Mortensen, 1925
- Anthenoides peircei Perrier, 1881
- Anthenoides piercei Perrier, 1881
- Anthenoides tenuis Liao & A.M.Clark, 1989
