= Astroceramus pernachus =

Scientific classification
- Kingdom: Animalia
- Phylum: Echinodermata
- Class: Asteroidea
- Order: Valvatida
- Family: Goniasteridae
- Genus: Astroceramus
- Species: A. pernachus

Binomial name
- Astroceramus pernachus Mah, 2026

Species of sea star

Astroceramus pernachus is a species of deep sea starfish in the family of Goniasteridae. It was first described by Christopher L. Mah in 2026 from specimens collected off New Caledonia in the southwestern Pacific Ocean. The species name pernachus is derived from the pernach, a type of flanged mace.

== Taxonomy ==
Astroceramus pernachus was formally described in 2026 and paratype specimens are deposited in the collections of the National Museum of Natural History in Paris, France.
