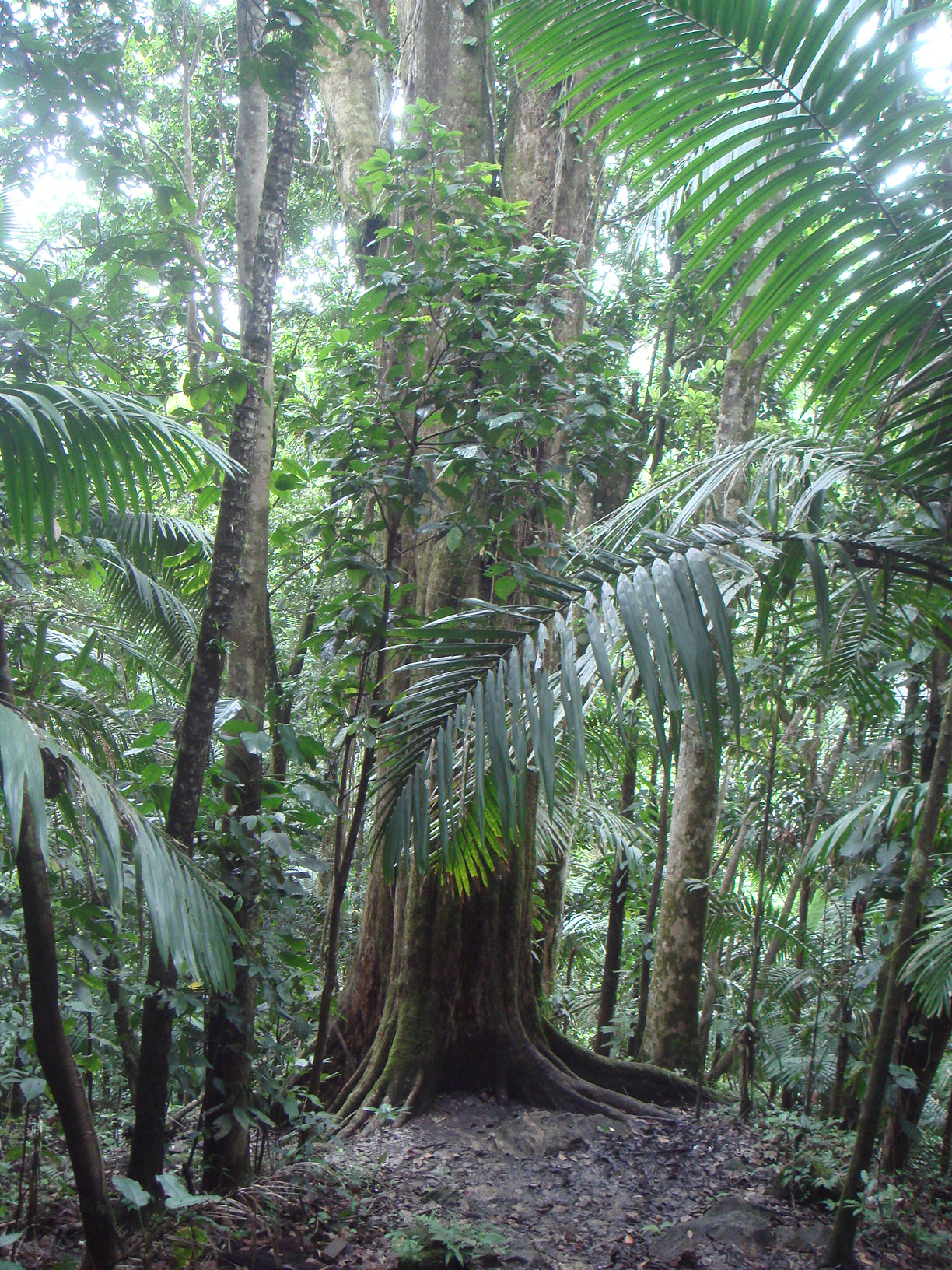
- In Puerto Rico

Conservation status
- Least Concern (IUCN 3.1)

Scientific classification
- Kingdom: Plantae
- Clade: Tracheophytes
- Clade: Angiosperms
- Clade: Eudicots
- Clade: Asterids
- Order: Ericales
- Family: Sapotaceae
- Genus: Manilkara
- Species: M. bidentata

Binomial name
- Manilkara bidentata (A.DC.) A.Chev.

Synonyms
- Mimusops bidentata A.DC. Mimusops globosa C.F.Gaertn. Mimusops balata Crueg. ex Griseb. List sources

= Manilkara bidentata =

Species of tree

Manilkara bidentata is a species of flowering plant in the family Sapotaceae, native to a large area of northern South America, Central America and the Caribbean. Common names include bulletwood, balatá, ausubo, massaranduba, quinilla, and (ambiguously) "cow-tree".

== Description ==
The balatá is a large tree, growing to 30–45 m (98–148 ft) tall. The leaves are alternate, elliptical, entire, and 10–20 cm (3.9–7.9 in) long. The flowers are white, and are produced at the beginning of the rainy season. The fruit is a yellow berry, 3–5 cm (1.2–2.0 in) in diameter, which is edible; it contains one (occasionally two) seed(s). Its latex is used industrially for products such as chicle.

== Uses ==
The latex is extracted in the same manner in which sap is extracted from the rubber tree. It is then dried to form an inelastic rubber-like material. It is almost identical to gutta-percha (produced from a closely related southeast Asian tree), and is sometimes called gutta-balatá.

Balatá was often used in the production of high-quality golf balls, to use as the outer layer of the ball. Balatá-covered balls have a high spin rate, but do not travel as far as most balls with a Surlyn cover. Due to the nondurable nature of the material the golf club strikes, balatá-covered balls do not last long before needing to be replaced. While once favored by professional and low-handicap players, they are now obsolete, replaced by newer Surlyn and urethane technology.

In 1943, Major League Baseball used balata instead of rubber in its baseballs due to wartime rationing. The balata balls initially displayed significantly less resilience (bounce) than rubber-core balls, forcing MLB to reformulate the balata-ball design several weeks into the season. MLB resumed using rubber in 1944.

Today, Brazil is the largest producer of Massaranduba wood, where it is cut in the Amazon rainforest.

The tree is a hardwood with a red heart, which is used for furniture and as a construction material where it grows. Locals often refer to it as bulletwood for its extremely hard wood, which is so dense that it does not float in water. Drilling is necessary to drive nailed connections. In trade, it is occasionally (and incorrectly) called "brazilwood".

The fruit, like that of the related sapodilla (M. zapota), is edible.

Though its heartwood may present in a shade of purple, Manilkara bidentata should not be confused with another tropical tree widely known as "purpleheart", Peltogyne pubescens.

This timber is being used to produce outdoor furniture and is being marketed as "Pacific Jarrah" in Australia.

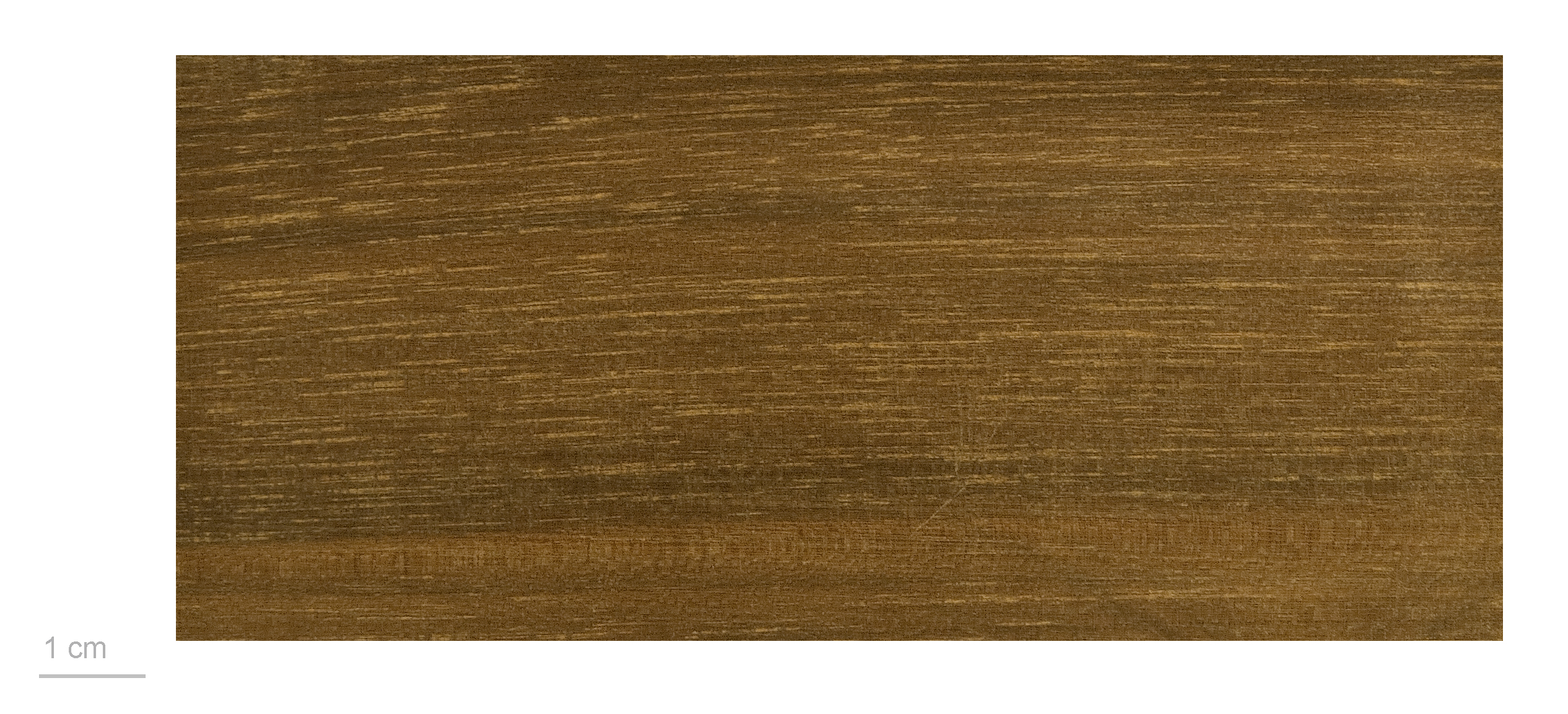
Manilkara bidentata – MHNT

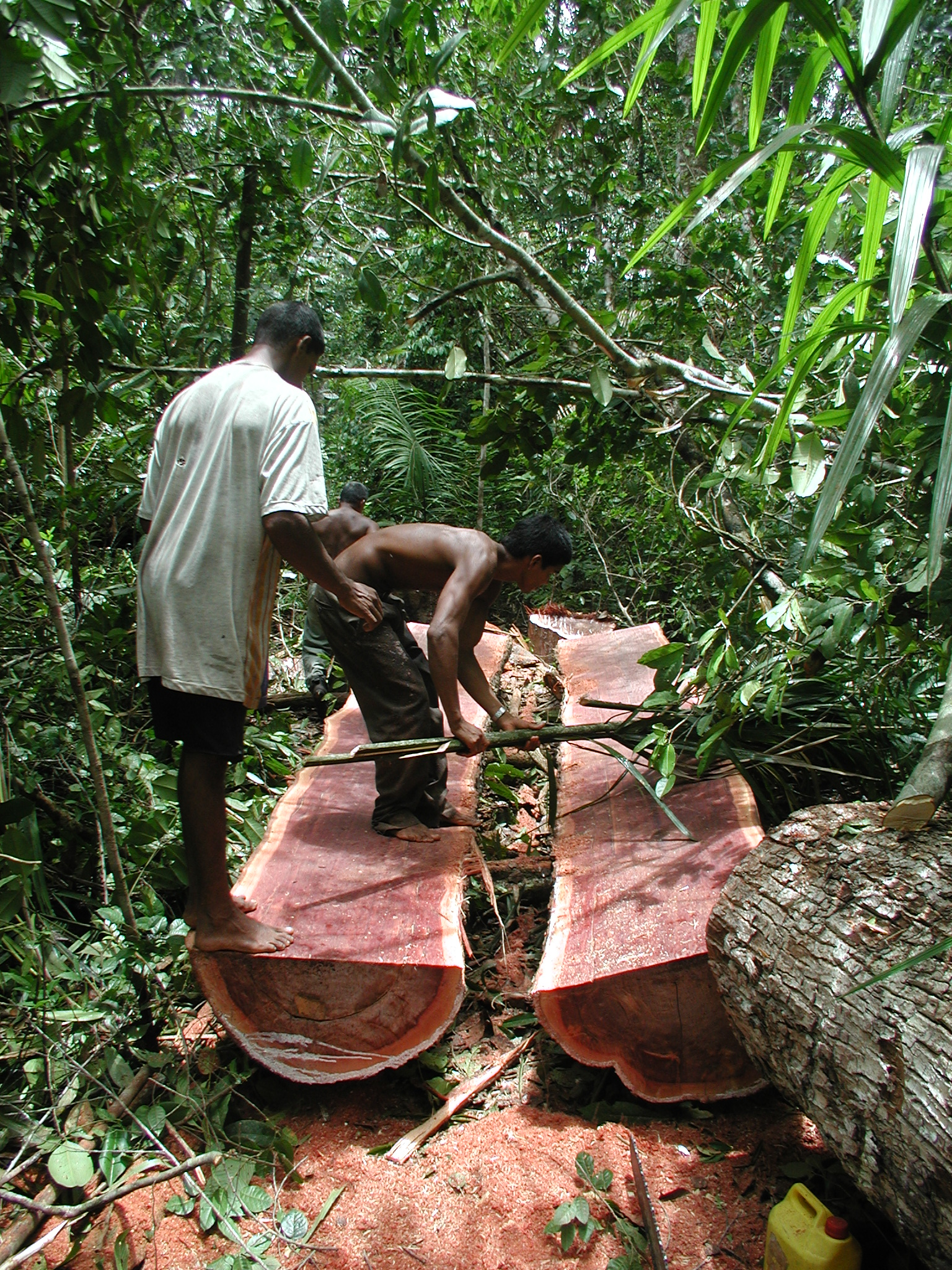
Harvesting bulletwood in Guyana

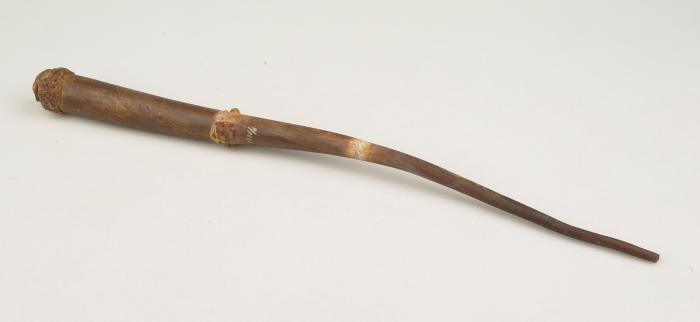
A whip handle of balatá, made before 1939
