= Astroceramus cyclus =

Scientific classification
- Kingdom: Animalia
- Phylum: Echinodermata
- Class: Asteroidea
- Order: Valvatida
- Family: Goniasteridae
- Genus: Astroceramus
- Species: A. cyclus

Binomial name
- Astroceramus cyclus Mah, 2026

Species of sea star

Astroceramus cyclus is a species of deep-sea starfish in the family of Goniasteridae. It was first described by Christopher L. Mah in 2026 from specimens collected off New Caledonia. The species belongs to the genus Astroceramus, a group of deep-sea sea stars found in Pacific ocean.

== Description ==
The body shape of the animal is a pentagonal like. Primary circlet composed of enlarged plates. Superomarginal plates 4 per interradius, pre terminal superomarginals abutted, each plate strongly tumid, enlarged relative to adjacent superomarginals.

== Taxonomy ==
Astroceramus cyclus was described in 2026. The holotype specimen (MNHN-IE-2013-7006) and paratype specimens are housed in the collections of the National Museum of Natural History in Paris, France.
