= Balata (latex) =

Type of a natural latex

Balatá is a latex, which is naturally extracted from the species, Manilkara bidentata (also known as bulletwood or balatá). It is native to northern South America, Central America, and the Caribbean.

It is used for various industrial applications, primarily in the production of rubber-like materials.

Balatá exhibits properties similar to the trans-isomer of polyterpene and is not vulcanizable. Due to its similarity to gutta-percha, balatá latex is sometimes referred to as "gutta-balatá" and is used for similar applications.

== Description ==
The Manilkara bidentata is a large tree, typically growing to a height of 30–45 meters. The tree typically measuring 10–20 cm long, produces small white flowers at the onset of the rainy season. It bears an edible yellow berry that contains one or two seeds. The latex extracted from the tree is thick and rubbery, resembling gutta-percha, a material derived from a related tree species found in Southeast Asia.

Historically, balatá was used for the outer covering of high-quality golf balls.

== Properties and uses ==
Balatá is a hard, rubber-like material derived from the dried latex of the Manilkara bidentata tree, primarily found in Guyana and the West Indies. The latex is harvested by making zigzag incisions in the tree's bark, allowing the milky fluid to flow into collection cups. The latex is then coagulated in trays to form a durable substance.

Typically it is tough, non elastic, leathery, and water-resistant. When heated, it becomes pliable. In the old times it served as a low cost alternative materia; to gutta-percha, especially in the preparation of golf balls and industrial machine belts.

The latex is harvested in a manner similar to that of the rubber tree (Hevea brasiliensis). Once extracted, it is dried to form an inelastic rubber-like material. One notable historical use of balatá was in the production of high-quality golf balls. These balls, covered in balatá, were known for their high spin rate, although they did not travel as far as those with modern synthetic covers like Surlyn. It possesses a tendency to wear down rather fast. Thus, balatá-covered golf balls have become rare today, and have been replaced by other materials such as polyurethane.
