= Chinese ginseng =

Chinese ginseng may refer to:

- Panax ginseng, the Asian ginseng or Korean ginseng
- Panax notoginseng, the South China ginseng or notoginseng
