= Cow tree =

Cow tree can refer to:

- Brosimum utile in the family Moraceae, native to southern Central America and northern South America
- Couma macrocarpa in the family Apocynaceae, a tropical rain forest tree native to Colombia, also known as leche caspi and perillo negro
- Gymnema lactiferum, Ceylon cow tree
- Melicytus ramiflorus, in the family Violaceae, native to New Zealand and Norfolk Island
- Manilkara bidentata, also known as the massaranduba tree, from Brazil
