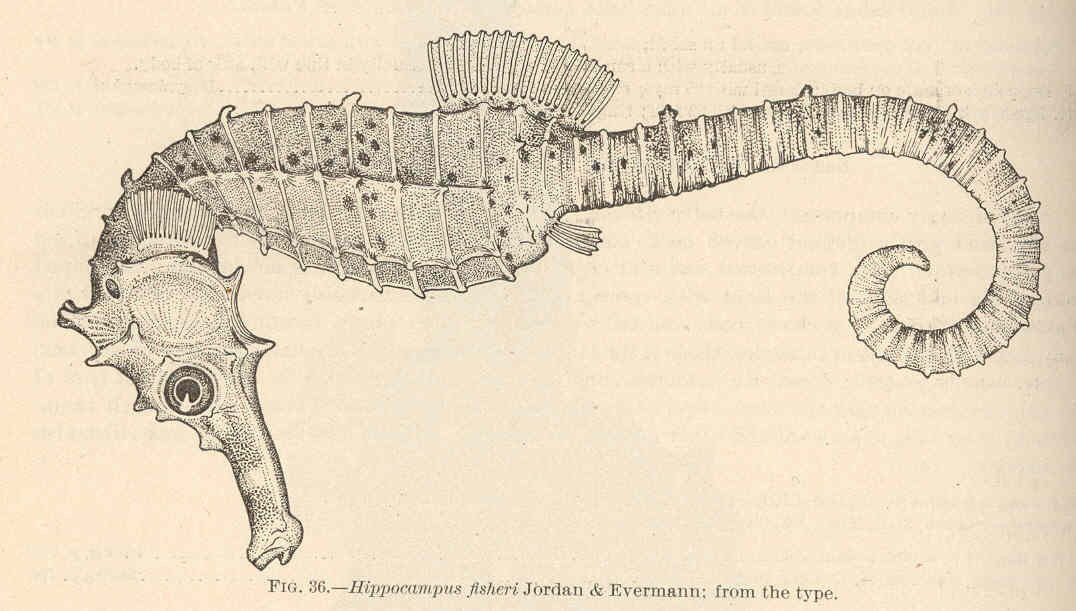

Conservation status
- Least Concern (IUCN 3.1)<iucn/>
- CITES Appendix II

Scientific classification
- Kingdom: Animalia
- Phylum: Chordata
- Class: Actinopterygii
- Division: Teleostei
- Order: Syngnathiformes
- Family: Syngnathidae
- Genus: Hippocampus
- Species: H. fisheri

Binomial name
- Hippocampus fisheri D. S. Jordan & Evermann, 1903

= Fisher's seahorse =

Species of fish

Hippocampus fisheri, commonly known as Fisher's seahorse, or the Hawaiian seahorse, is a species of fish of the family Syngnathidae. It is known from the Hawaiian Islands, although previous misidentifications indicated species occurrences in Australia and New Caledonia. Habitat preferences are unknown, but it has been found far away from shore and at depths greater than 100 metres (330 ft). Feeding habits are also unknown, but individuals are expected to feed on small crustaceans similar to other seahorses. Hippocampus fisheri is one out of the three species of Hippocampus genus found in the Hawaiian islands. They are also expected to be ovoviviparous, with males carrying eggs in a brood pouch before giving birth to live young. Individuals can grow to lengths of 8 centimetres (3.1 in). The specific name and the common name honour "Walter V. Fisher” of Stanford University. There was a Walter Kenrick Fisher who was Jordan and Evermann's colleague at Stanford and the “V” is assumed to be a typo.
