= Walter Kenrick Fisher =

American zoologist, evolutionary biologist, illustrator and painter

Walter Kenrick Fisher (February 1, 1878 – November 2, 1953) was an American zoologist, evolutionary biologist, illustrator, and painter. He taught in Stanford University before eventually becoming Emeritus Professor in Zoology until his retirement in 1943. Fisher was the son of ornithologist Albert Kenrick Fisher.

== Early life ==
Walter K. Fisher was born on February 1, 1878, in Ossining, New York. His father was Albert Kenrick Fisher and his mother was Alwilda Fisher (née Merritt). As a boy, Fisher explored the countryside around his home in the Hudson Valley, and as he grew older, he conducted similar explorations around Washington, D. C., following his family's relocation to the capital. During these ventures, he collected birds and plants, and he sketched the skulls he collected and the landscapes he encountered. Fisher demonstrated talent as an artist and initially considered pursuing his artistic inclinations. However, he ultimately decided to pursue a career in science, although he continued to paint and draw throughout his life.

== Career ==
Fisher began his studies at Stanford University as an undergraduate in 1897, he graduated with a bachelor's degree in 1901, obtained a master's degree in 1903 with a dissertation called The anatomy of Lottia gigantea Gray and his Ph.D, thesis was The starfishes of the Hawaiian Island in 1906. Fisher was appointed as an assistant in the Zoology Department from 1902 to 1905. He then served as an instructor between 1905 and 1909 before advancing to the position of assistant professor from 1909 to 1925. He concluded his career as a professor, a title he attained in 1925 and held until his retirement in 1943. He was also Director of the Hopkins Marine Station from 1917 up to his retirement.

At first he was more interested in botany, studying under William Russell Dudley. However, he was soon to show a preference for invertebrate zoology and this was facilitated by his service as a field naturalist for the US Biological Survey where he worked as an assistant on two of the "M.V. Albatross" expeditions of the United States Fish Commission, in the summers of 1902 and 1904. This experience, the diversity of the specimens collected which he was able to study while on these voyages, and his examination of other invertebrate collections, led him to undertake a specialism in echinoderms. At the same time he retained an interest in ornithology and prior to obtaining his bachelor's degree his scientific interests lay mainly in the study of birds. He was an Associate Member of the American Ornithologists' Union from 1899, in 1901 he was elected as a Member, becoming a Fellow in 1905, and in 1920 he was made a Fellow Emeritus.

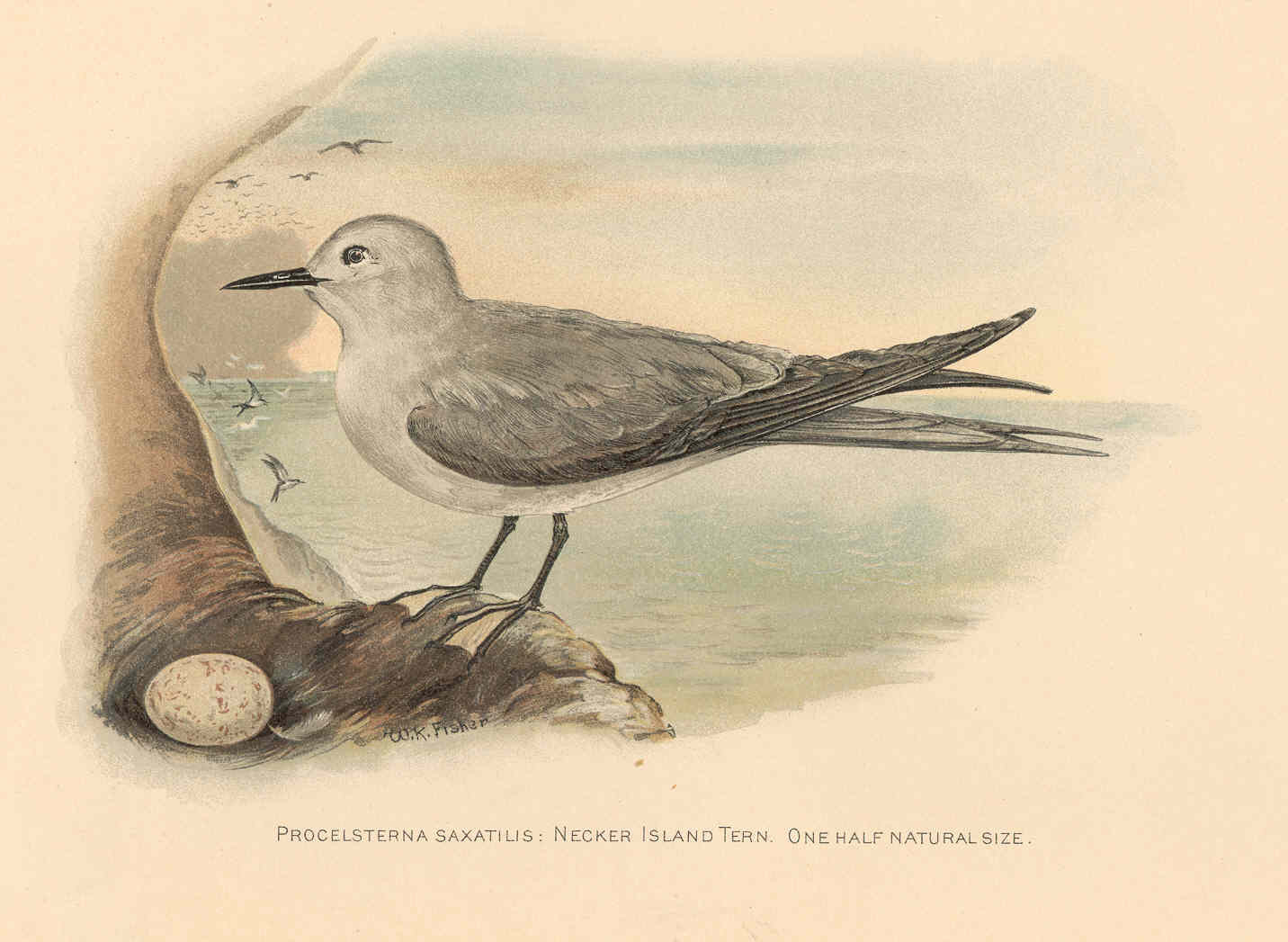
Procelsterna saxatilis Necker Island Tern by Walter Kenrick Fisher

Once he had decided to specialise in echinoderms Fisher soon became recognised as an authority on this phylum, and was soon regarded as one of the world's leading authorities on the echinoderms, he was also an authority on the Sipunculoidea and Echiuroidea. In 1906 he published the Starfishes of the Hawaiian Islands which was an account of the specimens collected during the 1906 expedition of the M.V. Albatross. This was followed in 1911 by Asteroidea of the North Pacific and Adjacent Waters, a monograph published by the U. S. National Museum which contained 400 pages, illustrated by Fisher with over 100 plates. The second part of this work came out in 1928, and the third in 1930, parts 2 and 3 combined being almost the same size as part 1. In 1940 the "Asteroidea" of the British "Discovery" Voyages was published. These larger volumes represent a few of Fisher's publications and he published many more specialised scientific papers during his working life, always illustrated by Fisher himself. He continued to work after retirement, studying the collections of the Smithsonian Institution, where he was as a Research Associate, even in the week before his death. For example, he described several new species during the year leading up to his death.

In the field of ornithology, Fisher served as the associate editor of the journal Condor from 1901 to 1902, subsequently assuming the role of editor from December 1902 to December 1905. During his tenure with the journal, he redesigned its cover, which remained in use from 1902 to 1946. Fisher also created a series of cartoons satirizing prominent ornithological figures of the time, which were published in the Condor in 1901. His interest in ornithology persisted throughout his life, and in addition to his work on invertebrates, he authored papers about birds in journals such as The Auk and the Condor, as well as in various publications by the United States Government.

For much of his time at Stanford the primary concern of Fisher's work was the Hopkins Marine Station. While the laboratory was located at Pacific Grove, he had collected and studied there as well as teaching in some of the summer sessions. Once the new laboratory was built at Lovers Point in 1917, he took up the post of its resident director and for nearly ten years he was its only full-time member of staff. This meant that for most of the year he was working on his own, responsible for nearly all aspects of running the academic and administrative work of the Station. The exception was when colleagues from Stanford, or visiting researchers, came to the Station to study, normally during the summer months. In Fisher's time at the laboratory its reputation grew, and it became increasingly utilised by workers in the field of marine biology, so much so that in 1928 a new building funded by a gift from the Rockefeller Foundation, a laboratory named after Jacques Loeb. By the opening of the new lab Fisher had been joined by other permanent, residential staff. These included Harold Heath from 1925, Tage Skogsberg from 1926, Cornelius Bernardus van Niel in 1929 and more from then. The additional staff allowed the Station to widen its educational and research programmes. As director, Fisher was able to keep a balance between the various biological disciplines. During Fisher's time as director of the Hopkins Marine Station he was involved in the zoological training of many graduate students.

Fisher was a Fellow of the California Academy of Sciences, being Curator of the Department of Invertebrate Zoology at the Academy from 1916 to 1932, he was a president of the Cooper Ornithological Club as well as being a member of a number of scientific societies, and of the Cosmos Club of Washington.

=== Association with Ed Ricketts and John Steinbeck ===
One negative anecdote about Fisher was that he and Ed Ricketts were said not to get along as Fisher had tried to stop the publication of Ricketts' Between Pacific Tides because it was "too radical". As a result, it was said that Ricketts would wait for Fisher to be away from the Station to access its library for information, but Fisher still named an echiurid worm, Thalassema steinbecki, for Ricketts' friend, John Steinbeck, in 1946 as an expedition led by Steinbeck had collected the type specimens. However, in a letter in response to questions about the validity of Steinbeck's and Ricketts' collaboration on The Log from the Sea of Cortez Steinbeck wrote "Dr. Fisher of the Hopkins Marine Station once said that Ed Ricketts and I together were the best single speculative zoologists in the world, and if he couldn't separate us, I would suggest that you do not try."

== Personal life and legacy ==
In 1922 Fisher married Anne Benson (1898–1967), who was a 22 year old bacteriologist when they met but who was to become a notable author of both fiction and non fiction books about California after their marriage. Fisher died in Carmel Valley, California, on November 2, 1953, at the age of 75.

Fisher had continued to draw and paint throughout his life, illustrating his own papers as well as co-operating with others on technical publications such as Birds of Laysan and the Leeward Islands, Hawaiian Group. He also illustrated the text his wife wrote for the Rivers of America series of books, The Salinas: Upside Down River. In addition Fisher painted still lifes and portraits in his leisure. Fisher was a member of the Carmel Art Association and frequently exhibited his paintings there and also in other galleries on the Monterey Peninsula.

His journals recording field trips to study mammals and birds in northern California, Nevada, the Sierras, and the Mono Lake region from 1897 to 1901 form the Walter K. Fisher Journals collection which are retained by the Stanford University Libraries Department of Special Collections and University Archives. They also hold a collection of his illustrations.

== Taxa named in his honor ==
The angelfish Centropyge fisheri (Snyder, 1904), Fisher’s seahorse (Hippocampus fisheri), the crinoid Parametra fisheri (Clark, 1908), the sea stars Nepanthia fisheri Rowe & Marsh, 1982, Astroceramus fisheri Koehler, 1909, the chiton Callistochiton fisheri W. H. Dall, 1919 and the peanut worm subgenus Fisherana Stephen, 1965 have all been named in honor of Fisher.
