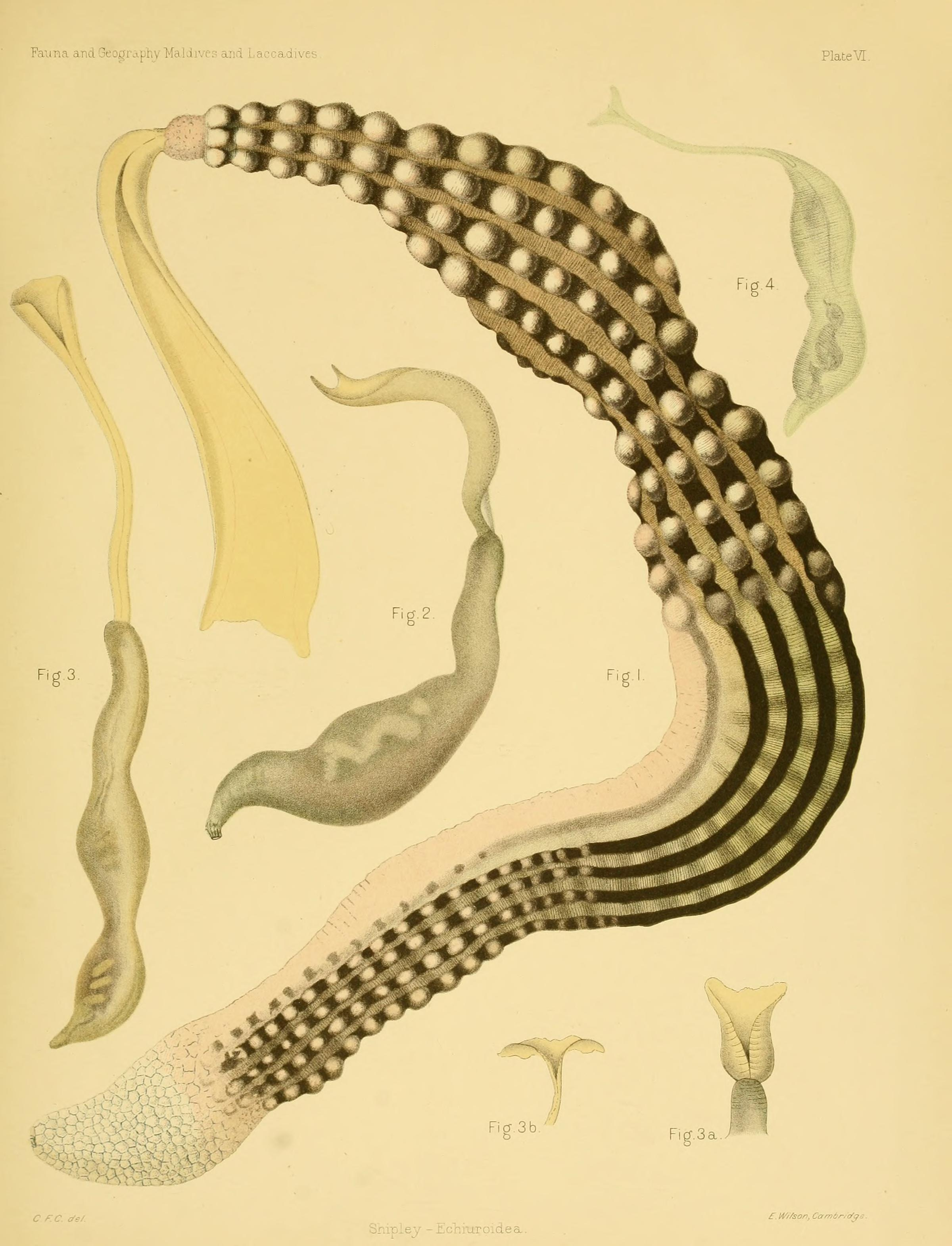
- Fig. 1 - Ochetostoma erythrogrammon Fig. 2 - Thalassema diaphanes Fig. 3 - Anelassorhynchus moebii Fig. 4 - Anelassorhynchus semoni

Scientific classification
- Kingdom: Animalia
- Phylum: Annelida
- Clade: Pleistoannelida
- Clade: Sedentaria
- Order: Capitellida
- Family: Thalassematidae
- Subfamily: Thalassematinae
- Tribe: Thalassematini; Forbes & Goodsir, 1841

Type genus
- Thalassema Pallas, 1774

Genera
- Anelassorhynchus; Arhynchite; Ikedosoma; Lissomyema; Listriolobus; Ochetostoma; Thalassema; †Llwygarua

Synonyms
- Thalassemaceae

= Thalassematini =

Thalassematini Temporal range: Middle Ordovician – Present, 462–0 Ma

Family of annelid worms

Thalassematini is a tribe of spoonworms in the subfamily Thalassematinae. They have a near cosmopolitan distribution around the worlds oceans, although a severely lacking fossil record, with Llwygarua from the Middle Ordovician of Wales being the only known thalassematid, and thus the oldest.

== Description ==
In 1841, Edward Forbes and John Goodsir would formally describe and name the Thalassematidae, or at the time then referred to as the "Thalassemaceae". In 2020, the name would change again to "Thalassematini" as a tribe. The tribe takes its name from the genus Thalassema, and is described as a group of vermigrade animals bearing cylindrical worm-like bodies, with one end terminating with a mouth placed on a proboscis covered by a simple sheath-like appendage. They also do not bear and bristles or chaetae around the anus, whilst the gonoducts are 1-7 pairs, with the gonostomal lips coiled spirally.

== Affinities ==
When originally described, Thalassema was placed within the phylum Echinodermata, based on their structural appearance and similarities to Holothuria. In 1841, Forbes and Goodsir would continue to accept this, though noted Thalassema being more similar in appearance to the Annelida based on previous presented evidence of the lack of feet. Despite this, the family Thalassematidae was at the time placed under the class Sipunculidea, which was at the time also assigned to the Echinodermata.

Over the preceding centuries, various studies would slowly rectify this, seeing the thalassematids placed within the subclass Echiura. Further studies would see the family then placed into the classic order "Echiuroinea", alongside the Echiuridae and Bonelliidae, although the Thalassematidae would later be reassigned to a newly established order Echiuroidea in 2016 by Rytaro Goto, then referred to as a superfamily. In 2020, Rytaro would lower the sublass Echiura down to the family-level, with Thalassematidae becoming the formal family name. Thus, the name "Thalassematini" was chosen for the new tribe, itself now contained within the Thalassematinae, with the taxa from Thalassematidae being assigned to the new tribe.

== Taxonomy ==
The tribe Thalassematini contains multiple genera, currently up to eight described in total, one of which is extinct. They are as follows, as per Goto et al. (2020), unless specified otherwise:-

- Thalassema Pallas, 1774
- Ochetostoma Rüppell & Leuckart, 1828
- Anelassorhynchus Annandale, 1922
- Listriolobus Fischer, 1926
- Arhynchite Satô, 1937
- Ikedosoma Bock, 1942
- Lissomyema Fisher, 1946
- † Llwygarua Botting et Muir, 2023

Under the original description of the tribe, or then the family Thalassematidae, these genera were also placed within this family, although have since been moved out and assigned to other or new subfamilies and tribes. They are as follows, as per Forbes et Goodsir (1841):-

- Sternaspis Ranzani, 1817
- Bonellia Rolando, 1821
- Echiurus Guérin-Méneville, 1831

== Fossil history ==
Reconstruction of Llwygarua suzannae from Castle Bank

A comparison between the extant Ochetostoma and extinct Llwygarua suzannae

Due to the lack of hard parts, the thalassematids have an effectively non-existent fossil record, save for the fossil genus Coprinoscolex ellogimus from the Mazon Creek fossil beds discovered in 1977, although its familial affinities remain unknown. Coprinoscolex would remain the only known fossil echiuran until the discovery and description of Llwygarua suzannae from the Castle Bank locality in Wales in 2023, which notably bore more detail than Coprinoscolex, which helped with more precise comparisons to modern taxa, such as the extant genus Ochetostoma, thus seeing it placed within the Thalassematidae with potential close affinities to Ochetostoma.
