= Ikeda taenioides =

Scientific classification
- Kingdom: Animalia
- Phylum: Annelida
- Clade: Pleistoannelida
- Clade: Sedentaria
- Subclass: Echiura
- Order: Echiuroidea
- Family: Ikedidae
- Genus: Ikeda
- Species: I. taenioides

Binomial name
- Ikeda taenioides (Ikeda, 1904)

Synonyms
- Thalassema taenioides Ikeda, 1904

Species of annelid worm

Ikeda taenioides is a species of spoon worm in the family Ikedidae. It is native to the northern Pacific Ocean where it is found in the subtidal waters around Japan.

== Taxonomy ==
This spoon worm was first described by the Japanese zoologist I. Ikeda in 1904 as Thalassema taenioides, the type locality being Misaki, Sagami Bay, in Honshu, Japan. Examination of the musculature of the body wall led to the observation that the longitudinal muscle layer lay outside both the circular layer and the inner oblique layer, and as this was at odds with all other members of the subclass Echiura, it warranted the creation of a new order. However, examination of the original material by Teruaki Nishikawa in 2002, showed that the longitudinal muscle layer was in fact between the circular layer and the oblique layer, as in all other echurians, throwing the taxonomy of the species into doubt. Nishikawa advocates that the family Ikedidae be regarded as a junior synonym of Echiuridae.

== Description ==
Ikeda taenioides is the largest spoon worm in the world, its proboscis being visible protruding from its burrow while the trunk remains hidden. The trunk can be 40 cm (16 in) long and the proboscis 150 cm (60 in).

== Ecology ==
Ikeda taenioides lives in soft sediment where it digs itself a burrow, often descending to 70 to 90 cm (28 to 35 in) below the sand surface. The proboscis is protruded through the burrow entrance to feed, and a number of these probosces were observed by researchers in 2011, some eight months after a tsunami had devastated the seabed habitat. The tsunami had destroyed the seagrass beds, the heart urchins and the Venus clams in the community; the researchers thought the spoon worms had survived the turbulent conditions because of the depths of their burrows.
