= Thalassema antarcticum =

Scientific classification
- Kingdom: Animalia
- Phylum: Annelida
- Clade: Pleistoannelida
- Clade: Sedentaria
- Subclass: Echiura
- Order: Echiuroidea
- Family: Thalassematidae
- Genus: Thalassema
- Species: T. antarcticum

Binomial name
- Thalassema antarcticum Stephen, 1941

Species of annelid worm

Thalassema antarcticum is a species of marine echiuran worm. This species is different from others in its genus that also have continuous longitudinal muscles by its lack of papillae on the body.
