= Listriolobus =

Scientific classification
- Kingdom: Animalia
- Phylum: Annelida
- Clade: Pleistoannelida
- Clade: Sedentaria
- Subclass: Echiura
- Order: Echiuroidea
- Family: Echiuridae
- Genus: Listriolobus; Fischer, 1926

Genus of annelid worms

Listriolobus is a genus of echiurans belonging to the family Echiuridae.

The genus has almost cosmopolitan distribution.

Species:

- Listriolobus bahamensis Fischer, 1926
- Listriolobus brevirostris Chen & Yeh, 1958
- Listriolobus capensis (Jones & Stephen, 1954)
- Listriolobus hexamyotus Fisher, 1949
- Listriolobus pelodes Fisher, 1946
- Listriolobus sorbillans (Lampert, 1883)
