= Ikeda =

Ikeda may refer to:

== Places ==
=== Japan ===
- Ikeda, Osaka, a city
- Ikeda, Fukui, a town
- Ikeda, Gifu, a town in Ibi District
- Ikeda, Gunma, a former village in Tone District
- Ikeda, Hokkaido, a town in Tokachi Subprefecture
- Ikeda, Kagawa, Shōzu District, Kagawa
- Ikeda, Nagano, a town
- Ikeda, Tokushima, a town in Miyoshi District

== Other uses ==
- Ikeda (surname), a Japanese surname
- Ikeda (comics), a character in Usagi Yojimbo
- Ikeda clan, a Japanese clan
- Ikeda map, a chaotic dynamical system
- Ikeda (spoon worm), a genus of the family Thalassematidae
- Ikeda Route, a road in Osaka and Hyōgo Prefectures, Japan
- Lake Ikeda, a lake on Kyushu island, Japan
- Ikeda's, a market in California
- Ikeda, a Brazilian e-commerce company acquired by Rakuten
