= Listriolobus pelodes =

Scientific classification
- Kingdom: Animalia
- Phylum: Annelida
- Clade: Pleistoannelida
- Clade: Sedentaria
- Subclass: Echiura
- Order: Echiuroidea
- Family: Echiuridae
- Genus: Listriolobus
- Species: L. pelodes

Binomial name
- Listriolobus pelodes Fisher, 1946

Species of annelid worm

Listriolobus pelodes is a species of marine spoon worm. It is found in shallow seas in the North East Pacific off the coast of California. It lives in a burrow in soft sediments.

== Description ==
Listriolobus pelodes has a plump, sausage-shaped body about 4 centimetres (1.6 in) long and 2 to 3 centimetres (0.79 to 1.18 in) wide. An extensible spoon-shaped proboscis projects from the anterior (front) end of the body and the mouth is at its base on the ventral side. There is a pair of hooked setae (bristles) projecting from the ventral surface of the body behind the mouth and a pair of nephridiopores nearby. The anus is at the posterior end of the body. There are two anal vesicles on either side of the rear end of the gut which are used for respiration. The body is a translucent green colour and there are eight longitudinal bundles of muscle in the body wall.

== Distribution ==
Listriolobus pelodes is found along the coast of North America ranging from northern California as far south as Baja California at depths between about 18 to 155 metres (59 to 509 ft). It lives in a burrow in fine grained sands and mud with a high content of organic matter.

== Biology ==
Listriolobus pelodes lives in a U-shaped burrow in the sediment. Its body remains below the surface while it extends its flexible proboscis across the substrate with the ventral side upwards. Sediment is scooped up by the proboscis and is wafted along a central groove to the mouth by the action of cilia. The sediment passes through the gut where the nutritive parts are digested and absorbed, and the residue is ejected through the anus as faecal pellets. The worm creates a current of water through the tube by peristaltic movements and this washes the pellets out of the second aperture of the tube. They accumulate nearby in little piles, the presence of which may show where these spoon worms are buried. The faecal pellets get ingested during further feeding activities and it is probable that rapidly growing bacteria and other micro-organisms form part of the diet. Other movements of the body wall draw water into and out of the anal vesicles and respiratory gases are exchanged. The worm periodically reverses its position in its burrow. The proboscis can extend to a length of 20 centimetres (7.9 in) and, feeding from the two burrow apertures, each worm can sweep an area of sediment of 0.25 square metres (2.7 sq ft). The feeding activities of this worm, occurring as it does in large numbers, has a considerable effect on the seabed ecosystem.

The sexes are separate in Listriolobus pelodes. The gonads are located beside the anal vesicles and liberate gametes into the coelom or body cavity. Here they mature and are then stored in the nephridia before being liberated into the sea in the late winter or spring. After fertilisation, the eggs hatch into planktonic trochophore larvae. After several developmental stages over a period of about six months, the larvae settle on the seabed and undergo metamorphosis into juvenile spoon worms. They seem to be attracted to settle in areas of fine, nutrient-rich sediment but the mechanism for this discrimination is unclear. The juveniles become sexually mature in another six to twelve months.

== Ecology ==
A number of other invertebrates take up occupation in this spoon worm's burrow and live there as commensals. These include the small crab Pinnixa schmitti, the bivalve mollusc Mysella tumida and the polychaete worm Hesperonoe laevis. These probably benefit from the protection from predators that the burrow provides and the nutrient rich stream of water passing through the burrow.

The spoon worm is preyed on by bottom feeding fish such as flounders, Dover sole (Microstomus pacificus) and bat rays (Myliobatis californicus).

In the 1970s, Listriolobus pelodes was found near wastewater discharge outlets off Los Angeles at densities of up to 1,500 individuals per square metre (11 square feet). The burrowing and feeding activities of these worms redistributed and aerated the sediment and promoted a more diverse community of fauna than would otherwise have existed in this heavily polluted area. The worms flourished for several years before disappearing from the area but their legacy of improved benthic diversity remained.
