= Thalassema steinbecki =

Scientific classification
- Kingdom: Animalia
- Phylum: Annelida
- Clade: Pleistoannelida
- Clade: Sedentaria
- Subclass: Echiura
- Order: Echiuroidea
- Family: Thalassematidae
- Genus: Thalassema
- Species: T. steinbecki

Binomial name
- Thalassema steinbecki Fisher, 1946

Species of annelid worm

Thalassema steinbecki is a species of marine echiuran worm. It is found in the northeast Pacific Ocean. This species was formally described in 1946 by the American marine biologist Walter Kenrick Fisher (1878-1953), the specific name honours the American novelist John Steinbeck (1902-1968) who led the expedition which collected the type specimens.
