= Gephyrea =

Gephyrea is a now-dismantled class of marine worms, containing the three modern taxa Echiura, Sipuncula, and Priapulida. Also Sternaspis, the first described genus in the family Sternaspidae, was at some point assumed to be related to Echiura and therefore included in the Gephyrea. This class was not monophyletic. Priapulida are now considered a distinct phylum among Ecdysozoa, while the other two taxa are classified as Annelids. The word was created by Quatrefages from the Greek γέφυρα (géphura) 'bridge', because these animals seemed intermediate between Annelids and Holothurians.
