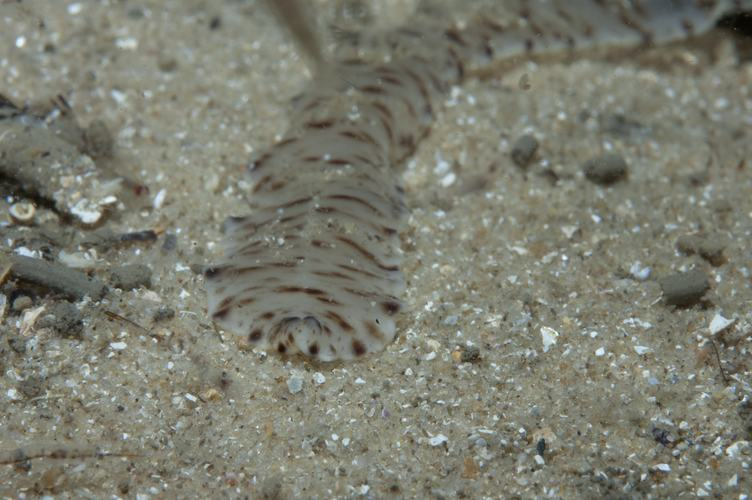
- Ikeda sp., marine worm. Port Phillip, Victoria.

Scientific classification
- Kingdom: Animalia
- Phylum: Annelida
- Clade: Pleistoannelida
- Clade: Sedentaria
- Order: Capitellida
- Family: Thalassematidae
- Subfamily: Bonelliinae; Bock, 1942
- Genus: Ikeda; Wharton, 1913

Species
- Ikeda pirotansis; Ikeda taenioides

= Ikeda (spoon worm) =

Family of annelid worms

Ikeda is a genus of spoon worm in the subfamily Bonelliinae.

== Species ==
The World Register of Marine Species recognises the following species in the genus:-

- Ikeda pirotansis (Menon & DattaGupta, 1962)
- Ikeda taenioides (Ikeda, 1904)
