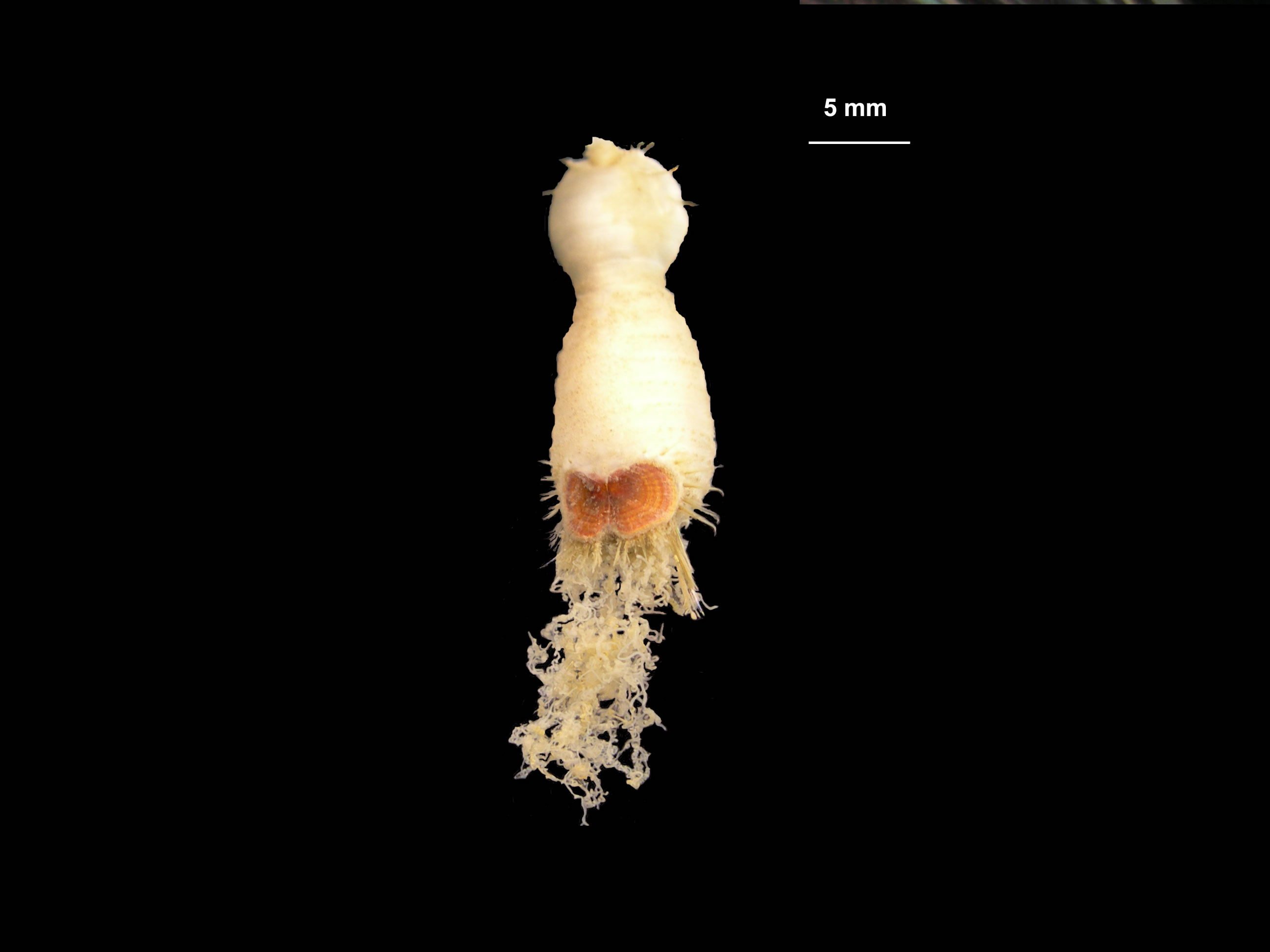

Scientific classification
- Kingdom: Animalia
- Phylum: Annelida
- Clade: Pleistoannelida
- Clade: Sedentaria
- Order: Terebellida
- Family: Sternaspidae
- Genus: Sternaspis
- Species: S. scutata

Binomial name
- Sternaspis scutata (Ranzani, 1817)

Synonyms
- Thalassema scutatus Ranzani, 1817

= Sternaspis scutata =

Species of annelid worm

Sternaspis scutata is a species of marine polychaete worm in the family Sternaspidae. It occurs in the Mediterranean Sea and the temperate northeastern Atlantic Ocean. It lives submerged in mud or other soft sediment.

== Description ==
Sternaspis scutata is a plump, whitish, barbell-shaped worm growing to a length of about 3.5 cm (1.4 in). The anterior region consists of seven segments, the second to fourth segments bearing lateral bundles of chaetae (bristles). This part is narrower and shorter than the posterior part of the worm which has thirteen to fifteen segments. On the underside of the posterior part there are two hard brown chitinous plates forming a shield, the margins of which are rimmed with bundles of long chaetae. A number of long, semi-coiled, thread-like gills arise from the base of the shield.

== Distribution and habitat ==
The range of S. scutata includes the Mediterranean Sea and the western Atlantic Ocean as far north as the English Channel; the type locality is the Gulf of İzmir on Turkey's west coast. It prefers depths between 9 and 36 m (30 and 120 ft). Records of individuals at greater depths are likely to refer to other, as yet undescribed species. It is extending its range and becoming more abundant along the south coast of England. Its typical habitat is mud or other soft sediment, where it lives close to the surface of the substrate.

== Behaviour ==
This worm lives buried in the sediment with its head down and with its filamentary gills at the surface, presumably to enhance oxygen uptake. It is a detritivore, scooping up and swallowing quantities of mud with its eversible pharynx, and absorbing nutrients as the bulk of material passes along the long, convoluted gut.
