= Llwygarua =

Llwygarua Temporal range: Middle Ordovician ~462 Ma
- The holotype specimen of Llwygarua suzannae

Scientific classification
- Kingdom: Animalia
- Phylum: Annelida
- Clade: Pleistoannelida
- Clade: Sedentaria
- Order: Capitellida
- Family: Thalassematidae
- Genus: †Llwygarua; Botting et Muir, 2023
- Species: †L. suzannae

Binomial name
- †Llwygarua suzannae Botting et Muir, 2023

Extinct genus of thalassematid spoon worm

Llwygarua (H-loui-garry-a) is an extinct genus of thalassematid annelid from the Middle Ordovician of Wales, and was alive sometime around 462 Ma. It has an elongate trunk with muscle bands and two ventral setae, a notably large proboscis adorned with two small projections. It is a monotypic genus, containing only Llwygarua suzannae, and is the oldest definitive echiuran.

== Discovery and naming ==
The holotype and fossils of Llwygarua were found in the Darriwilian-aged Castle Bank locality, which sits within the wider Gilwern Volcanic Formation near Llandrindod Wells in Wales in 2021, and would be formally described and named in 2023.

The generic name Llwygarua derives from the Welsh word "Llwy garu", to mean "Love spoon", not only in reference to the tradition of giving out carved wooden spoons to loved ones in Wales, but also to the echiurans, which are commonly known as "spoon worms". The specific name suzannae derives from the forename of the retired biologist Suzanne Douel, in honour of their continued support on research of the Castle Bank locality since its discovery.

== Description ==
Reconstruction of Llwygarua suzannae

Llwygarua suzannae is a small, thalassematid annelid with an elongate, trapezoidal trunk and bi-lobed proboscis, coming in at 7 mm (0 in) in length, and 1.2 mm (0 in) in width. The trunk is at its widest near the anterior (front), whilst it gradually tapers out towards the posterior (back), with the taper much more pronounced on the top than bottom, ending in a blunt point. In the paratype, longitudinal bands are visible on the trunk, inferred to be subdermal muscle bands, numbering between 8 – 12. Finer transverse lines are also found on these muscles bands closely bundled together. On the underside of the trunk and the anterior end can be found two setae, which are notably robust and straight, measuring in at 0.3 mm (0.012 in) in length.

The large proboscis has a notably midline separating the two lobes that it is composed of, and is roughly half the length of the trunk, and slightly thinner. The margin of the lobes are finely undulated and crenulated. In known material, the lobes also curl inwards on the underside. A collection of darker lines sit along the midline of the proboscis, roughly around where the gutter to the mouth would be. Either side of this midline there can also be found two small, sharply rounded projections, measuring in at 0.2 mm (0.008 in) in length. The whole proboscis is noted to have a reticulated texture, irregular in nature, with the polygonal cells that make up the reticulation measuring up to 0.07 mm (0.0028 in) in length.

== Affinities ==
A comparison between the extant thalassematid genus Ochetostoma and Llwygarua suzannae

Llwygarua is noted to not bear any comparisons with other known fossil echiurans, such as Coprinoscolex from the Mazon Creek fossil beds, thus making it uniquely distinct. Although in terms of similarities to extant echiurans, this too is difficult as there are non known to have reticulated proboscis, although it is noted that the probosces of extant echiurans is diverse, and that the reticulations are a surface feature or internal features such as blood vessels. Outside of this, Llwygarua is most comparable to the extant family Thalassematidae, specially to the large thalassematid genus Ochetostoma. Ochetostoma bears strongly bundled collections of longitudinal trunk muscles, whilst also bearing finer oblique muscles, although the number of longitudinal bands is considerably more, numbering from seven to twenty-two. The large proboscis is also similar to the proboscis in some species of Ochetostoma, from the bi-lobed appearance, the crenulated margin, to the pointed projections. Thus, these features saw Llwygarya not only placed within the phylum Echiura, making it the oldest known echiuran before Coprinoscolex, but also to the family Thalassematidae, making it the oldest known thalassematid, and with potential close affinities with Ochetostoma.

== Significance ==
If the thalassematid assignment of Llwygarua is true and can be upheld, then this shows that echiurans had already diversified as early as the Middle Ordovician period. With the lack of any proper molecular clock studies, besides one done by Parry et al. in 2014 which suggested echiurans appearing after the Ordovician, recent evidence of annelids as a whole diversifying during the Cambrian period makes the appearance of notably derived Llwygarua, and thus the echiurans at least, not unexpected.
