= Anelassorhynchus =

Scientific classification
- Kingdom: Animalia
- Phylum: Annelida
- Clade: Pleistoannelida
- Clade: Sedentaria
- Subclass: Echiura
- Order: Echiuroidea
- Family: Thalassematidae
- Genus: Anelassorhynchus; Annandale, 1922

Species
- See text

Genus of annelid worms

Anelassorhynchus is a genus of spoonworms in the subclass Echiura.

== Species ==
The World Register of Marine Species includes these species in this genus:-

- Anelassorhynchus adelaidensis Edmonds, 1960
- Anelassorhynchus branchiorhynchus (Annandale & Kemp, 1915)
- Anelassorhynchus chaetiferus DattaGupta, Menon & Johnson, 1963
- Anelassorhynchus dendrorhynchus (Annandale & Kemp, 1915)
- Anelassorhynchus fisheri DattaGupta, 1974
- Anelassorhynchus inansensis (Ikeda, 1904)
- Anelassorhynchus indivisus (Sluiter, 1900)
- Anelassorhynchus loborhynchus DattaGupta & Menon, 1966
- Anelassorhynchus microrhynchus (Prashad, 1919)
- Anelassorhynchus moebii (Greeff, 1879)
- Anelassorhynchus mucosus (Ikeda, 1904)
- Anelassorhynchus panamensis Biseswar & Glynn, 2016
- Anelassorhynchus porcellus Fisher, 1948
- Anelassorhynchus sabinus (Lanchester, 1905)
- Anelassorhynchus semoni (Fischer, 1896)
- Anelassorhynchus vegrandis (Lampert, 1883)
