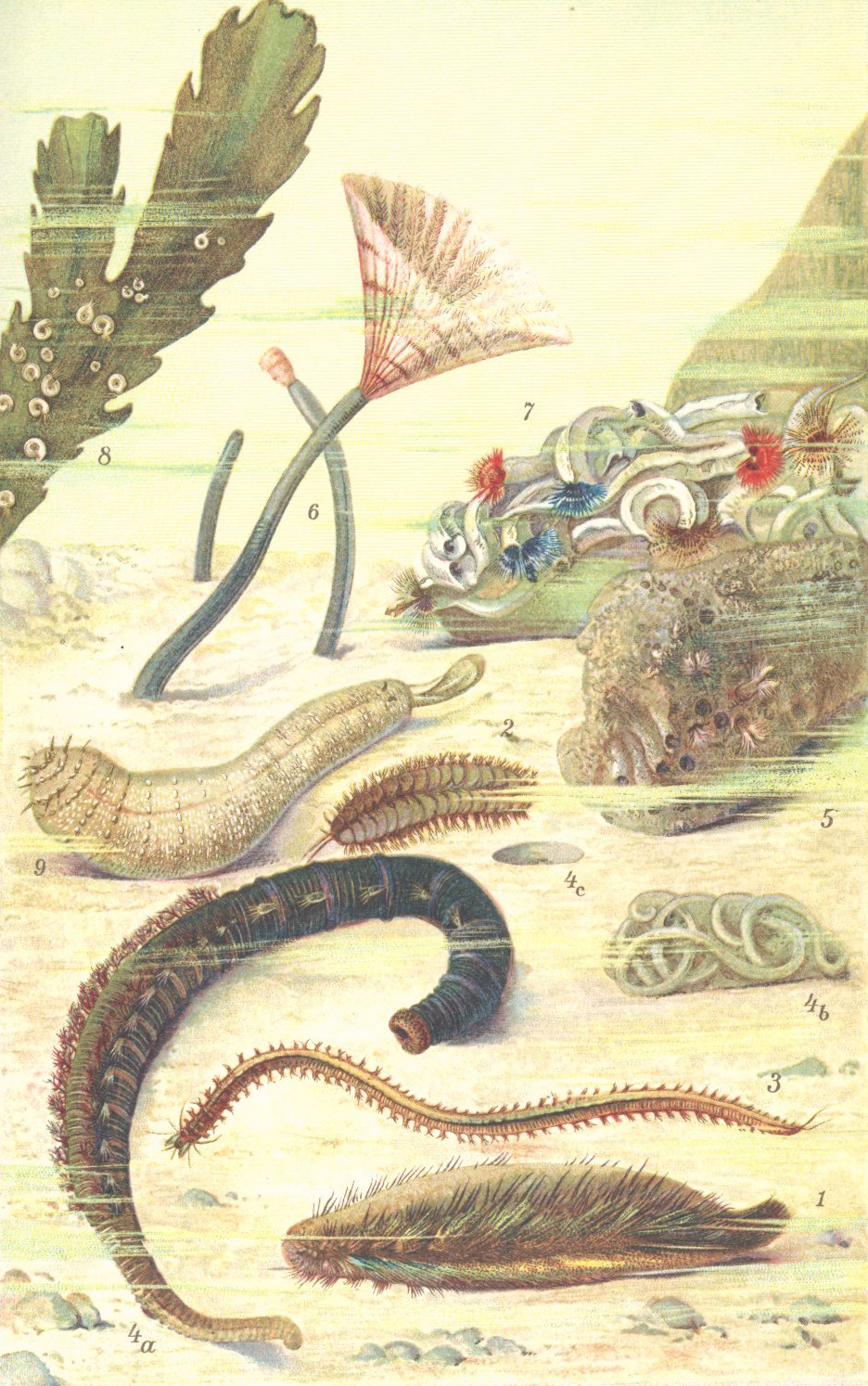
- Worms: E echiurus is at centre left

Scientific classification
- Kingdom: Animalia
- Phylum: Annelida
- Clade: Pleistoannelida
- Clade: Sedentaria
- Subclass: Echiura
- Order: Echiuroidea
- Family: Echiuridae
- Genus: Echiurus
- Species: E. echiurus

Binomial name
- Echiurus echiurus (Pallas, 1766)

Synonyms
- Echiurus chrysacanthophorus (Couthouy, 1838); Echiurus forcipatus (Fabricius, 1780); Echiurus gaertnerii Quatrefages, 1847; Echiurus luetkenii Diesing, 1859; Echiurus pallasii (Guérin-Méneville, 1831); Echiurus vulgaris (Savigny, 1822); Lumbricus echiurus Pallas, 1766; Thalassema pallasii Guérin-Méneville, 1831; Thalassema echiura (Pallas, 1766); Thalassema vulgaris Savigny, 1822

= Echiurus echiurus =

Species of annelid worm

Echiurus echiurus is a species of spoon worm in the family Echiuridae. It is found in the North Atlantic Ocean and a subspecies is found in Alaska. It burrows into soft sediment and under boulders and stones in muddy places.

== Description ==
This spoon worm has a roughly cylindrical trunk between 70 and 110 mm (2.8 and 4.3 in) long. At the anterior end of the trunk, just beside the mouth, a scoop-shaped proboscis about 30 to 40 mm (1.2 to 1.6 in) long extends forward. The trunk has about 22 rings of papillae, a ring of larger papillae alternating with several rings of smaller papillae. A pair of hooked chaetae (chitinous bristles) is borne just behind the mouth on the underside of the worm and there are two rings of chaetae on the posterior end of the trunk, near the anus. Internally, the rectum is partially obscured by two long anal diverticula with ciliated funnels. Externally, the trunk is greyish-brown while the proboscis is orange with brownish streaks.

== Distribution ==
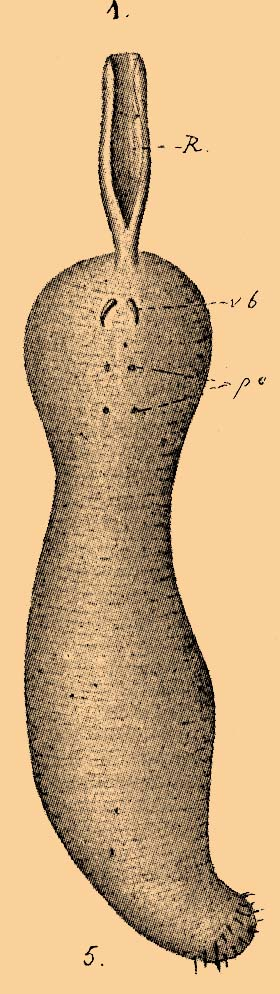
Echiurus

Echiurus echiurus has a holarctic distribution, extending southwards in the Atlantic Ocean as far as the North Sea and the Kattegat, burrowing into soft sediment, often at considerable depths. A subspecies Echiurus echiurus alaskanus occurs in southeastern Alaska, its range extending from Point Barrow, Alaska to Puget Sound, Washington. This subspecies inhabits muddy deposits that accumulate around boulders and pebbles in the lower intertidal zone and the shallow subtidal zone.

== Ecology ==
When burrowing, the proboscis is raised and folded backwards and plays no part in the digging process. The front of the trunk is shaped into a wedge and pushed forward, with the two anterior chaetae being driven into the sediment. Next the rear end of the trunk is drawn forward and the posterior chaetae anchor it in place. These manoeuvres are repeated and the worm slowly digs its way forwards and downwards. It takes about forty minutes for the worm to disappear from view. The burrow descends diagonally and then flattens out, and it may be a metre or so long before ascending vertically to the surface. Here, the worm unfolds its proboscis and extends it along the surface of the sediment to feed, retreating into its burrow when the tide goes out.
