= Gephyrean =

Gephyrean may refer to:

- Gephyrea, an obsolete class of marine worms
- Gephyreans, Gephyraeans or Gephyraei, a clan or lineage established in Boeotia in antiquity; see History of the Greek alphabet § Herodotus' account

== See also ==
- Gephyra
