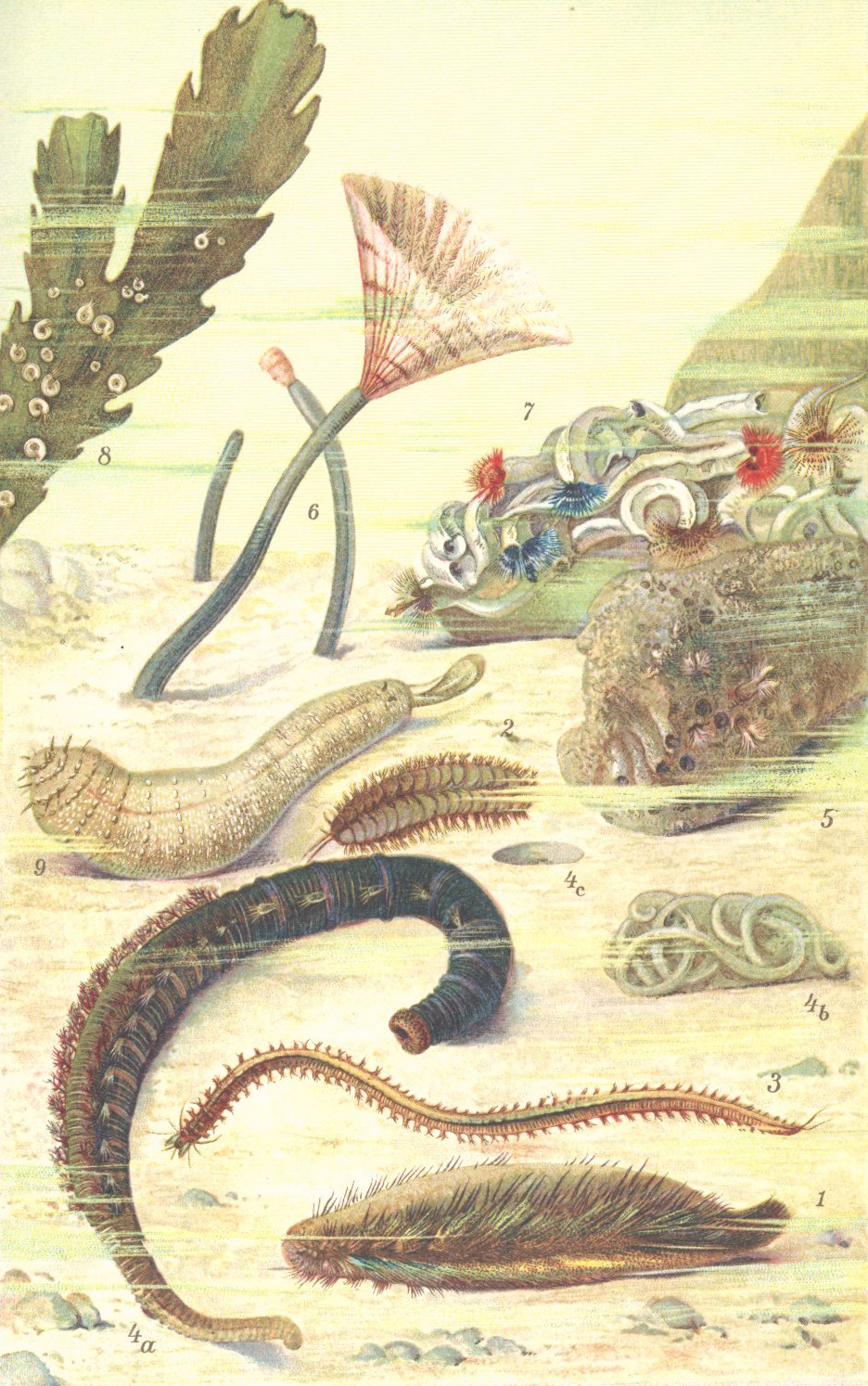
- Worms: E echiurus is at centre left

Scientific classification
- Kingdom: Animalia
- Phylum: Annelida
- Clade: Pleistoannelida
- Clade: Sedentaria
- Order: Capitellida
- Family: Thalassematidae
- Subfamily: Thalassematinae
- Tribe: Echiurini; Quatrefages, 1847

Type genus
- Echiurus Guérin-Méneville, 1831

Genera
- Echiurus; Urechis

= Echiurini =

Tribe of annelid worms

Echiurini is a tribe of spoon worms. It contains two genera: Echiurus and Urechis, united by the synapomorphy of having one or two rings of chaetae around the anus. A species of the genus Urechis is also eaten as a prized food source in Asia.

== Description ==
Members of the Echiurini are described as Thalassematinae with one or two rings of anal chaetae around the rear of the trunk, whilst gonoducts number 1-3 pairs. In Urechis, the gonostomes are spirally coiled, whilst their proboscis is very short and does not have a closed vascular system present. Meanwhile, in Echiurus, the gonostomes are not coiled, whilst their proboscis is notably elongated, and they do have a closed vascular system present.

== Distribution and habitat ==
The Echiurini can be found predominately around Asia and the North Atlantic, with Urechis being found along the coasts of Russia, Japan, Korea, as well as being the only one found in the Bohai Gulf of China. Meanwhile, Echiurus has a considerably wider range, having a holarctic distribution in the Atlantic ocean, being found in bodies of water as far south as the North Sea and the Kattegat, burrowing up to considerable depths. It can also be found distributed from north Alaska as Point Barrow, all the way down to Puget Sound in Washington, here its found in shallower waters.

== Culinary use ==
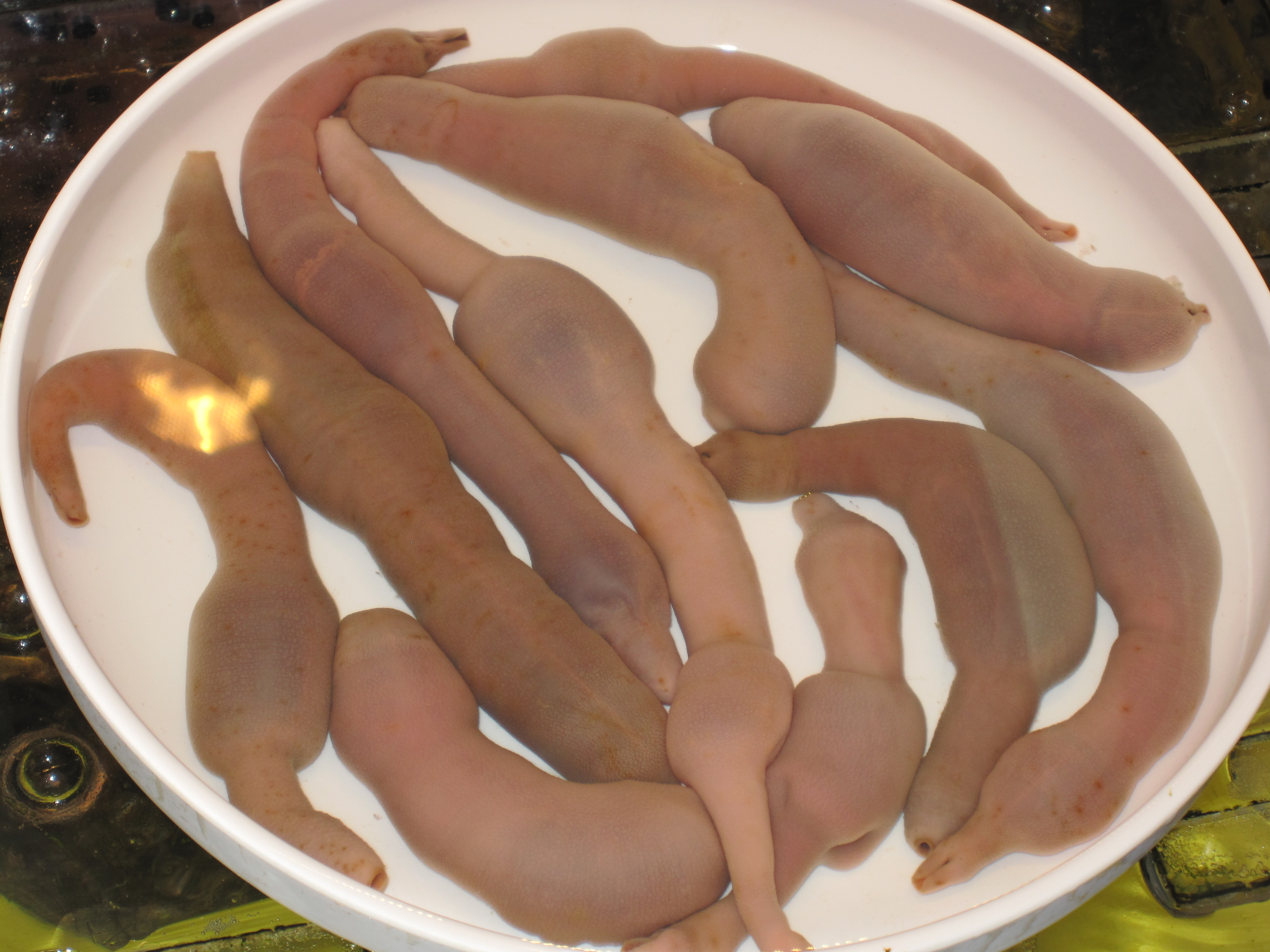
Spoon worms at a market in South Korea

The genus Urechis is commonly eaten Asia, primarily due to its notable taste and high nutritional values. So much so that in South Korea, the species Urechis unicinctus are known as gaebul (개불), and are quite prized, being commonly found in markets chopped up and served raw alongside various other seafoods, such as sea cucumbers, and dressed in chili sauce and soy sauce. Although, it has been noted that a lot of U. unicinctus are still caught from the wild, due to the lack of aquaculture infrastructure in place to farm them, as the industry surrounding this is relatively new. This, combined with how prized they are, has led to considerable overfishing of U. unicinctus, which has in turn led to a considerable reduction in its population. Studies have been undertaken alongside this to better understand the genetic diversity of U. unicinctus, as to aid in the development and management of the species, as well as to improve its nutritional values even further.

== Genera ==
Echiurini contains the following genera:

- Echiurus Guérin-Méneville, 1831
- Urechis Seitz, 1907
