= Cuenot =

Cuenot or Cuénot (English: /kweɪˈnoʊ/, French: [kɥeno]) is a French surname. Notable people with the surname include:

- Bénédicte Cuenot, French combustion engineer
- Gaspard Cuenot (born 1991), Swiss skier and biathlete
- Lucien Cuénot (1866–1951), French biologist
- Stephen Theodore Cuenot (Étienne-Théodore Cuénot Thể, 1802–1861), French Catholic missionary, bishop, and saint
