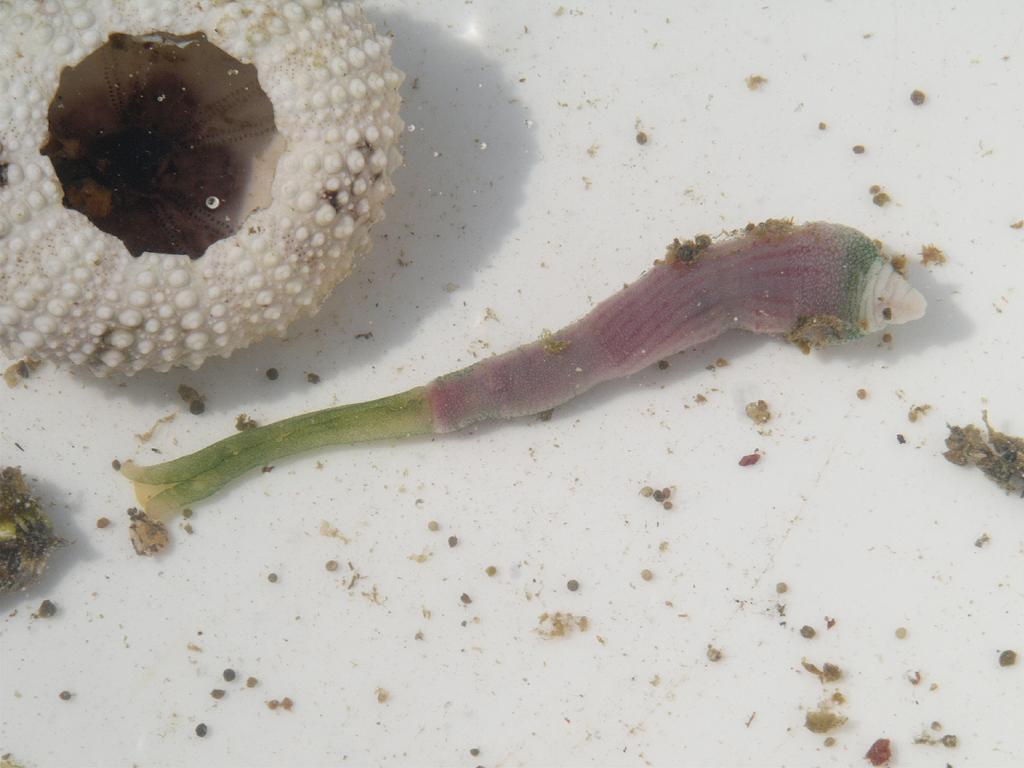

Scientific classification
- Kingdom: Animalia
- Phylum: Annelida
- Clade: Pleistoannelida
- Clade: Sedentaria
- Subclass: Echiura
- Order: Echiuroidea
- Family: Thalassematidae
- Genus: Ochetostoma
- Species: O. erythrogrammon

Binomial name
- Ochetostoma erythrogrammon Rüppell & Leuckart, 1828

= Ochetostoma erythrogrammon =

Species of annelid worm

Ochetostoma erythrogrammon is a species of spoon worm in the family Thalassematidae. It is found in shallow water in the Atlantic Ocean, the Mediterranean Sea, and the Indian and Pacific Oceans, burrowing in soft sediment.

== Description ==
Like other echiurians, O. erythrogrammon is very mobile and flexible. It consists of a sausage-shaped trunk up to 160 mm (6 in) in length, with reddish longitudinal grooves and a violet-coloured posterior. This is attached to a gutter-like proboscis, a third to three quarters the length of the body, green on its dorsal surface and yellowish on its ventral surface.

== Distribution and habitat ==
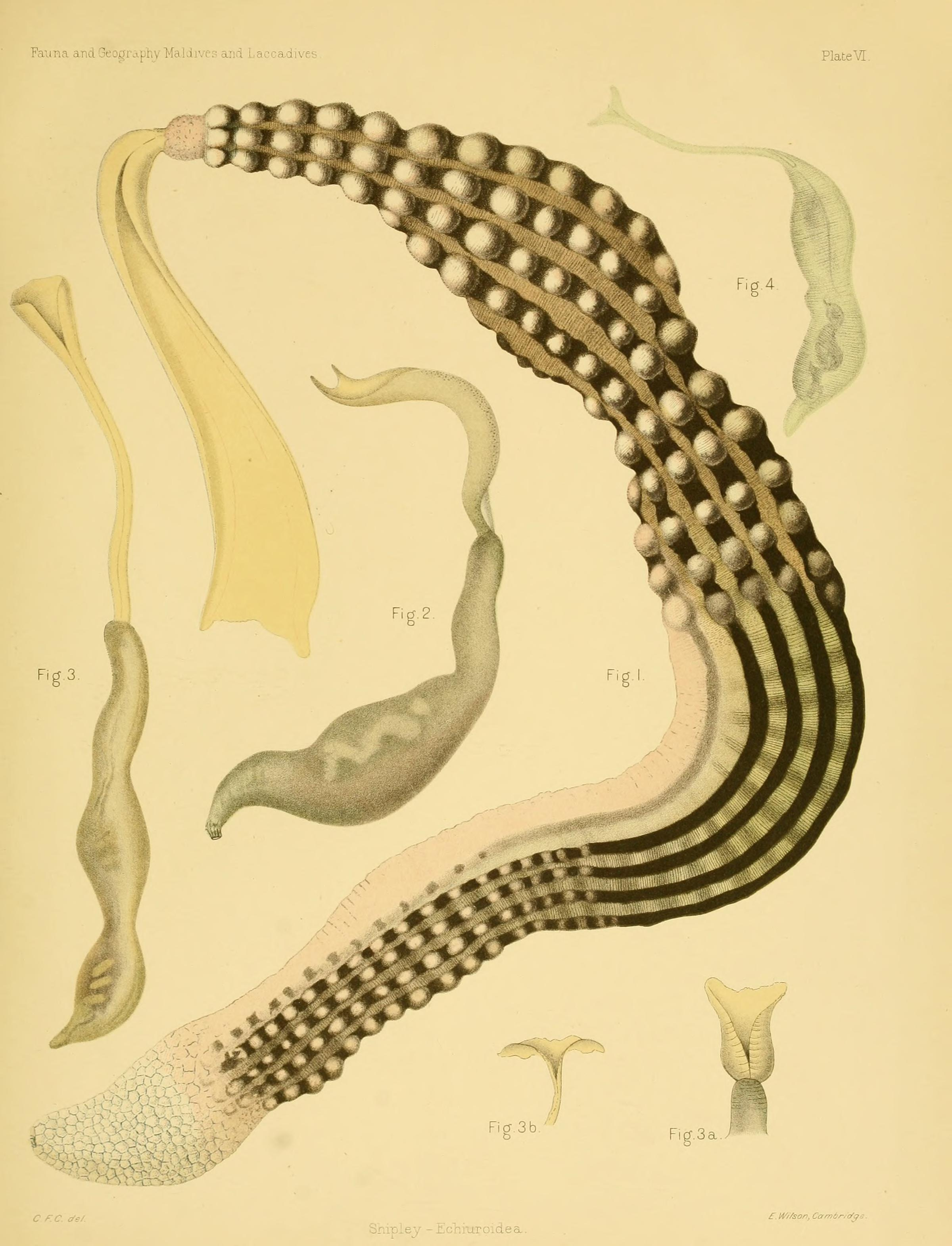
O. erythrogrammon is the largest image

Ochetostoma erythrogrammon occurs in the Atlantic Ocean, the Mediterranean Sea, and the Indian and Pacific Oceans. Its typical habitat is beaches of muddy sand where it lives in a burrow it digs in the intertidal zone. Countries from which this spoon worm has been reported in the Indo-Pacific region include Somalia, Mauritius, Malaysia, Indonesia, Vietnam, Hong Kong and Japan. It is also known from the Red Sea, the Mediterranean Sea, South Africa, Bermuda, Bahamas, Venezuela and Brazil.

== Ecology ==
This spoon worm tunnels into the soft sediment and creates a burrow in which it lives. Digging is performed mostly by the basal region of the proboscis, with the trunk playing little part in the process. The burrow is U-shaped, having a horizontal section 1 cm (0.4 in) wide and some 25 to 45 cm (10 to 18 in) long, with a vertical or oblique section about 20 cm (8 in) long at either end. The proboscis can be extended through an entrance just 3 mm (0.12 in) wide while the other end of the tube is plugged with mud or sand.

Feeding takes place shortly after the tide retreats while the sediment is still wet. The proboscis is extended like a scoop, first scraping up the sediment and detritus close to the burrow entrance and ingesting it, and then extending with the tip moving progressively farther away. The proboscis becomes thinner and narrower as it lengthens and may reach 25 cm (10 in) in length. The dorsal surface of the proboscis is pressed against the wet sediment, and sand and debris particles are coated with mucus and moved by cilia along the grooved, ventral surface to the mouth. Large particles are discarded. The worm can turn round in its burrow and search for food through what was the rear entrance of the burrow. If disturbed the proboscis rapidly retreats into the burrow.

A number of other organisms live inside the burrow as commensals. These include various species of polyclad flatworms, scale worms, bivalve molluscs, gastropod molluscs, pea crabs, snapping shrimps and copepods; several associates can share the burrow with the spoon worm simultaneously.
