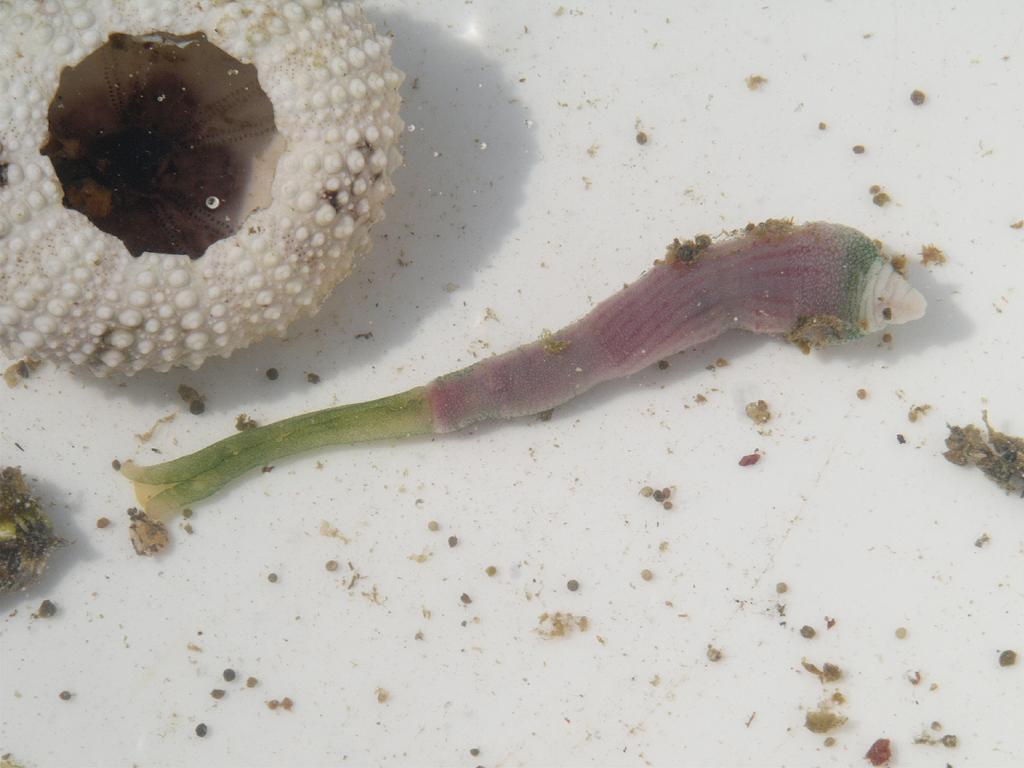
- Ochetostoma erythrogrammon sujiyumusi

Scientific classification
- Kingdom: Animalia
- Phylum: Annelida
- Clade: Pleistoannelida
- Clade: Sedentaria
- Subclass: Echiura
- Order: Echiuroidea
- Family: Thalassematidae
- Genus: Ochetostoma; Rüppell & Leuckart, 1828

= Ochetostoma =

Genus of annelid worms

Ochetostoma is a genus of echiurans belonging to the family Thalassematidae.

The genus has almost cosmopolitan distribution.

Species:

- Ochetostoma arkati (Prashad, 1935)
- Ochetostoma australiense Edmonds, 1960
- Ochetostoma azoricum Rogers & Nash, 1996
- Ochetostoma baronii (Greeff, 1872)
- Ochetostoma bombayense (Prashad & Awati, 1929)
- Ochetostoma caudex (Lampert, 1883)
- Ochetostoma decameron (Lanchester, 1905)
- Ochetostoma eaouari (Lesson, 1830)
- Ochetostoma erythrogrammon Rüppell & Leuckart, 1828
- Ochetostoma formosulum (Lampert, 1883)
- Ochetostoma glaucum (Wesenberg-Lund, 1957)
- Ochetostoma griffini (Wharton, 1913)
- Ochetostoma hornelli (Prashad, 1921)
- Ochetostoma hupferi (Fischer, 1895)
- Ochetostoma indosinense Wesenberg-Lund, 1939
- Ochetostoma kempi (Prashad, 1919)
- Ochetostoma kokotoniense (Fischer, 1892)
- Ochetostoma maldivense Bock, 1942
- Ochetostoma manjuyodense (Ikeda, 1905)
- Ochetostoma mercator Wesenberg-Lund, 1954
- Ochetostoma multilineatum (Fischer, 1914)
- Ochetostoma natalense Biseswar, 1988
- Ochetostoma octomyotum Fisher, 1946
- Ochetostoma palense (Ikeda, 1924)
- Ochetostoma pellucidum (Fischer, 1895)
- Ochetostoma punicea Dartnall, 1976
- Ochetostoma senegalense Stephen, 1960
- Ochetostoma septemyotum DattaGupta, Menon & Johnson, 1963
- Ochetostoma stuhlmanni (Fischer, 1892)
- Ochetostoma zanzibarense Stephen & Robertson, 1952
