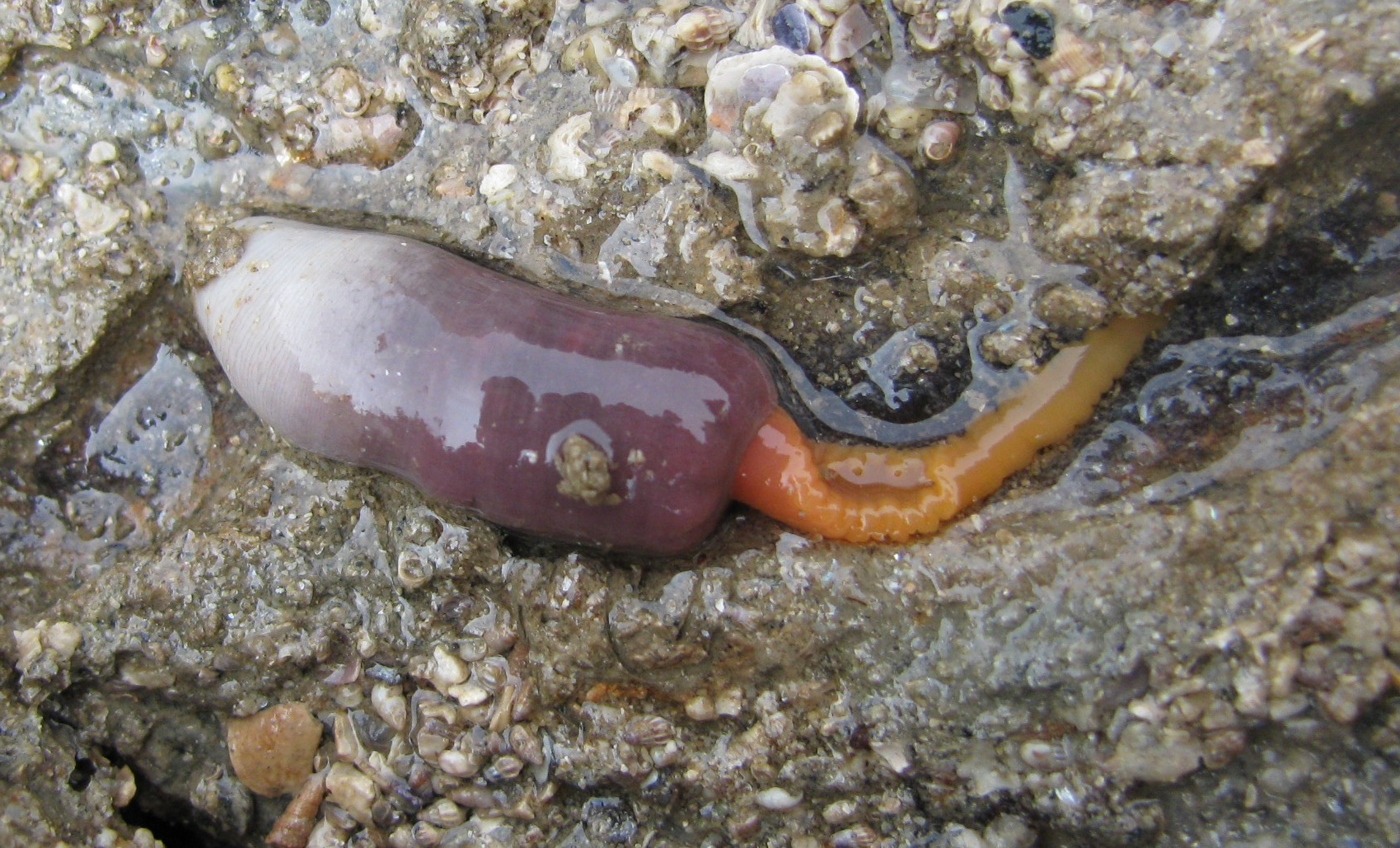
- Thalassema thalassema

Scientific classification
- Kingdom: Animalia
- Phylum: Annelida
- Clade: Pleistoannelida
- Clade: Sedentaria
- Order: Capitellida
- Family: Thalassematidae
- Genus: Thalassema; Pallas

Type species
- Lumbricus thalassema Pallas, 1774

Species
- See text

Synonyms
- Thalassina Montagu, 1813; Thalessema Leach, 1816

= Thalassema =

Genus of annelid worms

Thalassema is a genus of spoonworms in the subclass Echiura.

== Species ==
The World Register of Marine Species includes these species in this genus:-

- Thalassema antarcticum Stephen, 1941
- Thalassema arcassonense Cuénot, 1902
- Thalassema diaphanes Sluiter, 1889
- Thalassema elapsum Sluiter, 1912
- Thalassema fuscum Ikeda, 1904
- Thalassema hartmani Fisher, 1947
- Thalassema jenniferae Biseswar, 1988
- Thalassema liliae Schaeffer, 1972
- Thalassema malakhovi Popkov, 1992
- Thalassema marshalli Prashad, 1935
- Thalassema mortenseni Fischer, 1923
- Thalassema ochotica Pergament, 1961
- Thalassema ovatum Sluiter, 1902
- Thalassema owstoni Ikeda, 1904
- Thalassema papillosum (Delle Chiaje, 1822)
- Thalassema philostracum Fisher, 1947
- Thalassema steinbecki Fisher, 1946
- Thalassema sydniense Edmonds, 1960
- Thalassema thalassema (Pallas, 1774)
- Thalassema viride Verrill, 1879
