= Ikeda's =

Market, bakery, and restaurant in Auburn, California

Coordinates: 38.9281°N 121.0551°W

Ikedas California Country Market & Pie Shop
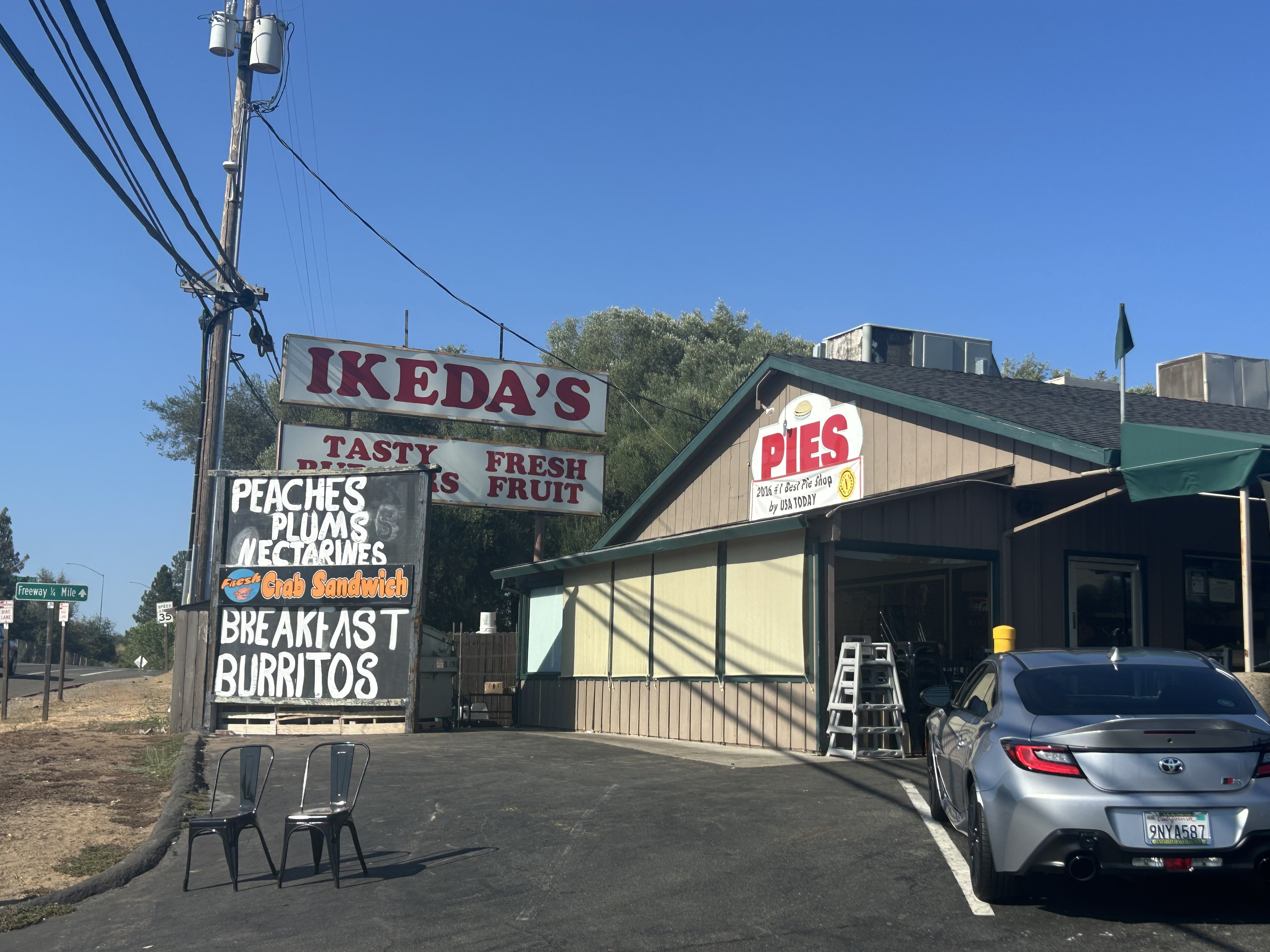
- Ikeda's in Auburn (2026)
- Industry: Market; Restaurant; Bakery
- Founded: 1972; 54 years ago in Auburn, California, U.S.
- Founder: Sally and Sam Ikeda
- Number of locations: 2
- Key people: Ikeda family
- Website: www.ikedas.com

Ikedas California Country Market & Pie Shop, commonly referred to as Ikeda's, is a market, restaurant, and bakery in Auburn, California. There is an Ikeda's in Davis, California.

== Description ==
There are two Ikeda's, the original location in Auburn and one in Davis. The Auburn location is a market, restaurant, and bakery, whereas the Davis location is more of a fruit stand. Ikeda's is known for their fresh fruit, and high quality ingredients, wines, and prepared foods at their original location in Auburn. Some of the fruit sold at Ikeda's comes from their family farm (Note: The farm is listed as being either 20 or 35 acres large.) a mile away from the Auburn location. The restaurant sells burgers, poke bowls, smoothies, and milkshakes.

Due to being located along I-80, Ikeda's is a popular pit stop for travelers commuting between the Bay Area and Lake Tahoe.

Ikeda's operates as a family business, and is currently run by the third generation of the Ikeda family.

== Recognition ==
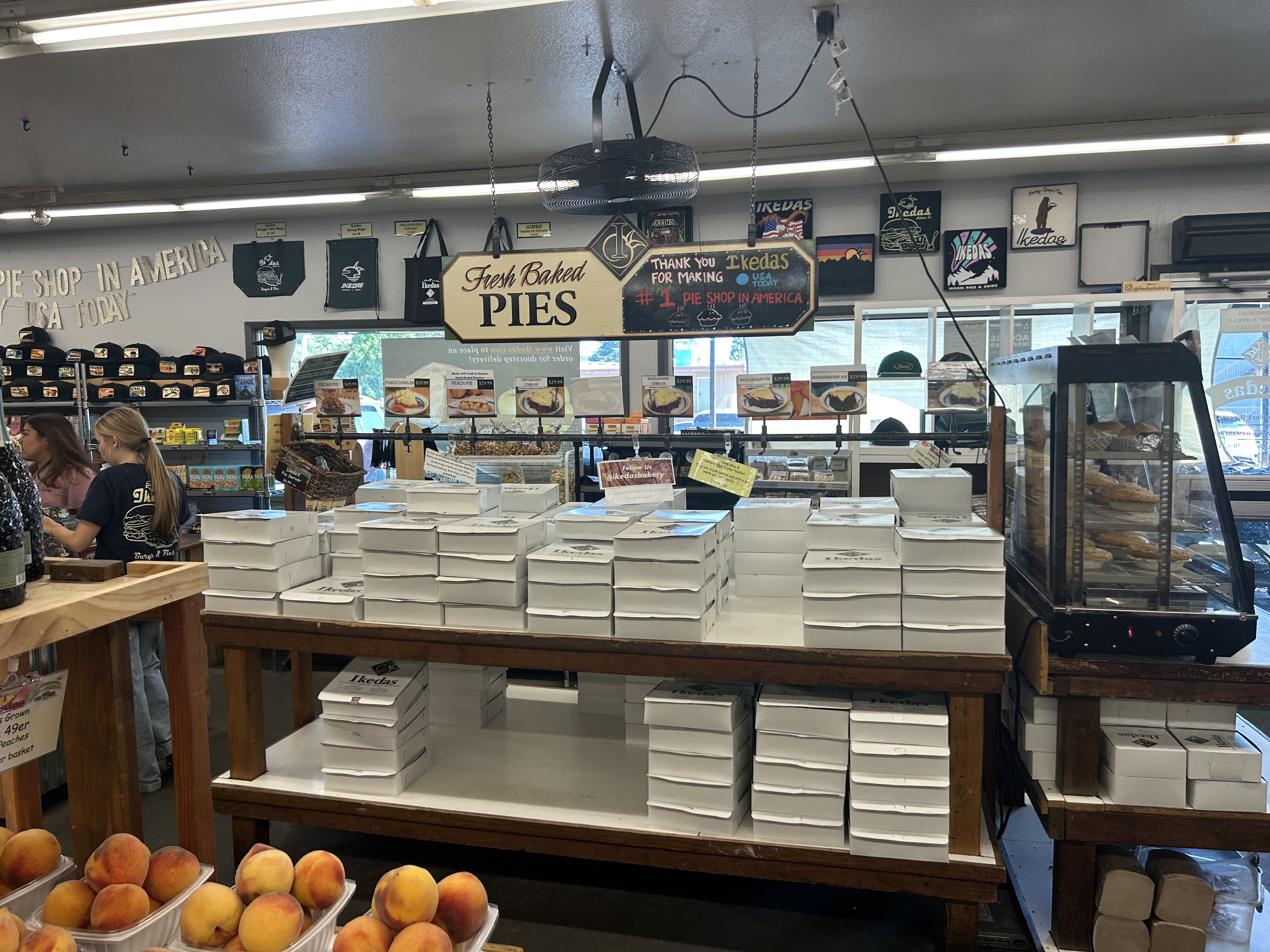
Fruit pies for sale at Ikeda's in Auburn

Ikeda's is known for their pies and makes between 20 and 22 varieties, including flavors like dutch apple, strawberry rhubarb, pumpkin, cherry, and chicken pot pie. Ikeda's sells over 120,000 pies annually. Glen Ikeda, Sally and Sam's eldest son, started Ikeda's pie business as a way to use bruised produce.

In June 2026, after media appearances and social media outreach to vie for support, Ikeda's won first place in USA Today’s 2026 10 Best Readers’ Choice Awards for Best Pie Shop. Ikeda's was a runner-up for the same award in 2025.

== History ==
In 1950, Sam and Sally Ikeda (Note: Sally and Sam were incarcerated at Tule Lake War Relocation Center as children during WWII due to anti-Japanese sentiment in the United States.) of Penryn, California formed a partnership with Everett Gibson, an established grower in the region, and started a fruit stand off of Highway 40 in Auburn, California to sell freshly picked fruit from their farm directly to customers. The opening of Interstate 80 in California improved the already growing business. Sam and Sally took over the business after Gibson retired, and opened the Ikeda's store in Auburn in 1972.

During the Covid-19 pandemic, Ikeda's stayed open as a grocery store but temporarily halted its bakery.

A second location opened in Davis, California in 2000. The Ikeda family is contemplating opening other locations throughout the Bay Area and Northern California.
