= Bénédicte Cuenot =

French combustion engineer

Bénédicte Cuenot (French: [benedikt kɥəno]) is a French engineer specializing in the numerical simulation of combustion and related phenomena, including turbulent flow, the flow of plasma, and heat transfer. Her software has been used to investigate the emission of pollutants and other products of combustion, non-carbon-based fuels including hydrogen, ammonia, and metal energy carriers, the start and end of combustion, and the ability of combustion chambers to stand up under use. She heads the combustion research group at the European Centre for Research and Advanced Training in Scientific Computation (CERFACS) in Toulouse, and holds a professorship in mechanical engineering at Eindhoven University of Technology in the Netherlands.

== Education and career ==
Cuenot studied engineering at the École Centrale Paris, earning an engineering degree and master's degree in 1990. She completed a doctorate in 1995, with the thesis Étude asymptotique et numérique de la structure des flammes de diffusion laminaires et turbulentes [Asymptotic and numerical study of the structure of laminar and turbulent diffusion flames] supervised by Thierry Poinsot at the National Polytechnic Institute of Toulouse. She earned a habilitation in 2000.

After becoming head of combustion research at CERFACS, in 2021 she added a part-time affiliation as professor at Eindhoven University of Technology, where she is affiliated with the group of Jeroen A. van Oijen in the department of mechanical engineering.

== Recognition ==
Cuenot was elected to the inaugural 2018 class of Fellows of The Combustion Institute, "for excellent advances in the modelling and simulation of turbulent flames in complex, multi-physics environments".
