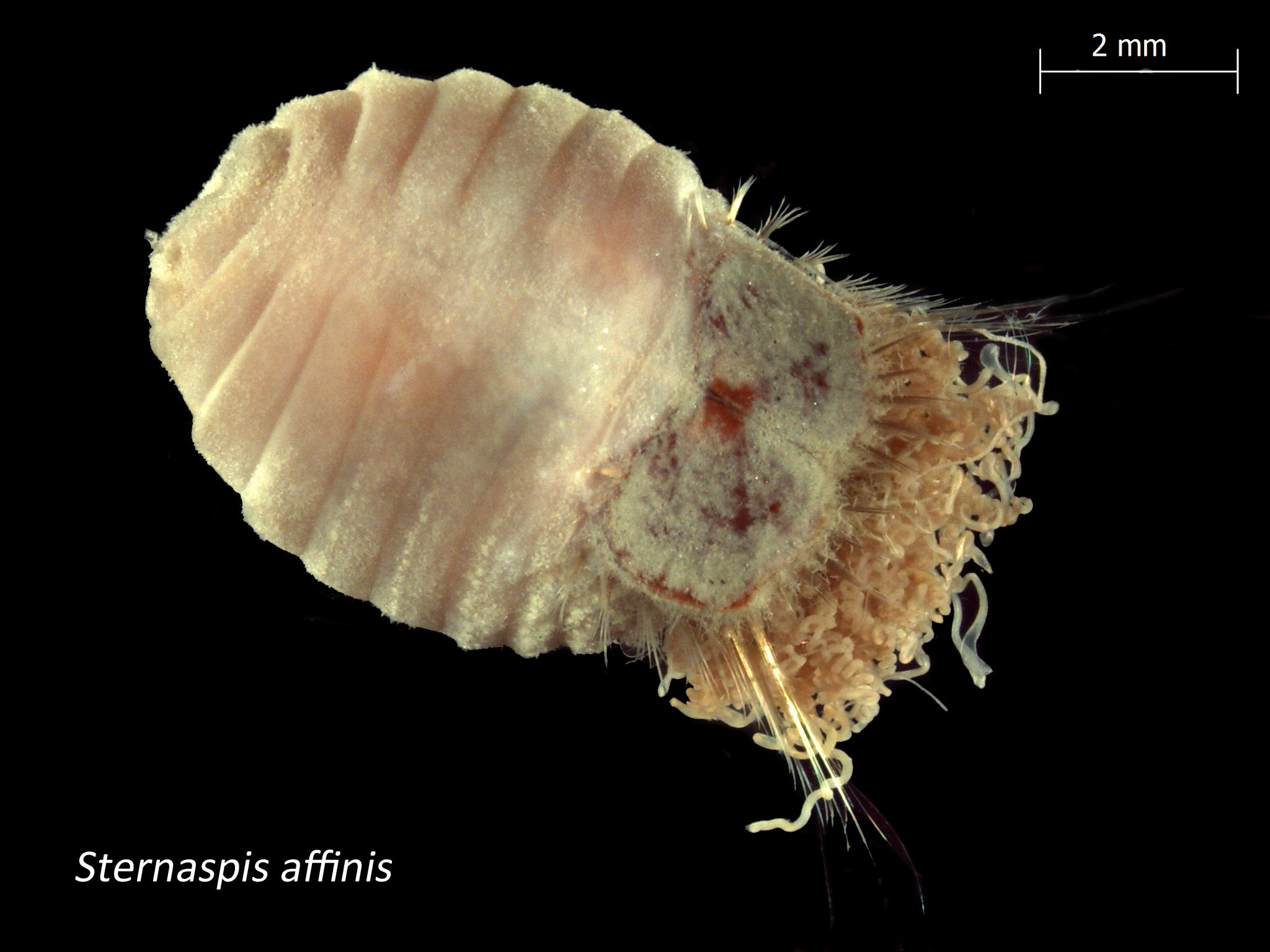
- Sternaspis affinis

Scientific classification
- Domain: Eukaryota
- Kingdom: Animalia
- Phylum: Annelida
- Clade: Pleistoannelida
- Clade: Sedentaria
- Order: Terebellida
- Family: Sternaspidae
- Genus: Sternaspis; Otto, 1820

= Sternaspis (annelid) =

Genus of annelids

Sternaspis is a genus of annelids belonging to the family Sternaspidae.

The genus has cosmopolitan distribution.

Species:

- Sternaspis affinis Stimpson, 1864
- Sternaspis africana Augener, 1918
- Sternaspis andamanensis Sendall & Salazar-Vallejo, 2013
- Sternaspis annenkovae Salazar-Vallejo & Buzhinskaja, 2013
- Sternaspis britayevi Zhadan, Tzetlin & Salazar-Vallejo, 2017
- Sternaspis buzhinskajae Salazar-Vallejo, 2014
- Sternaspis chilensis Diaz-Diaz & Rozbaczylo, 2017
- Sternaspis chinensis Wu, Salazar-Vallejo & Xu, 2015
- Sternaspis costata Marenzeller, 1879
- Sternaspis fossor Stimpson, 1853
- Sternaspis islandica Malmgren, 1867
- Sternaspis lindae Salazar-Vallejo, 2017
- Sternaspis liui Wu, Salazar-Vallejo & Xu, 2015
- Sternaspis londognoi Salazar-Vallejo, 2017
- Sternaspis maior Chamberlin, 1919
- Sternaspis maureri Salazar-Vallejo & Buzhinskaja, 2013
- Sternaspis nana Zhadan, Tzetlin & Salazar-Vallejo, 2017
- Sternaspis papillosa Zhadan, Tzetlin & Salazar-Vallejo, 2017
- Sternaspis piotrowskiae Salazar-Vallejo, 2014
- Sternaspis princeps Selenka, 1885
- Sternaspis radiata Wu & Xu, 2017
- Sternaspis rietschi Caullery, 1944
- Sternaspis scutata (Ranzani, 1817)
- Sternaspis sendalli Salazar-Vallejo, 2014
- Sternaspis shelockae Salazar-Vallejo, 2017
- Sternaspis sherlockae Salazar-Vallejo, 2017
- Sternaspis spinosa Sluiter, 1882
- Sternaspis sunae Wu & Xu, 2017
- Sternaspis thalassemoides Otto, 1820
- Sternaspis thorsoni Sendall & Salazar-Vallejo, 2013
- Sternaspis uschakovi Salazar-Vallejo & Buzhinskaja, 2013
- Sternaspis williamsae Salazar-Vallejo & Buzhinskaja, 2013
