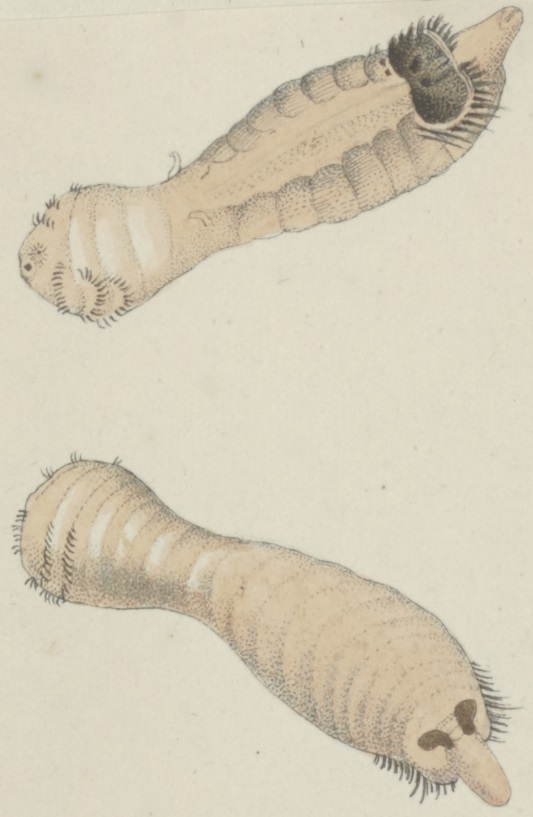
- Sternaspis thalassemoides (Otto, 1820)

Scientific classification
- Kingdom: Animalia
- Phylum: Annelida
- Clade: Pleistoannelida
- Clade: Sedentaria
- Order: Terebellida
- Family: Sternaspidae; Carus, 1863

Genera
- See text

= Sternaspidae =

Family of annelids

Sternaspidae, commonly known as mud owls, are a family of marine polychaete worms with short swollen bodies. They have a global distribution and live buried in soft sediment at depths varying from the intertidal zone to 4,400 m (14,400 ft).

== Description ==
Members of this family have oval or dumbbell-shaped bodies with a small number of segments, the prostomium often being separated from the rest of the body by a narrower segment. The peristomium is reduced to lips. The first segment of the prostomium, bears the mouth but no antennae, palps or nuchal organ. The first three segments bear rows of chaetae (bristles) and the next seven segments bear lateral bundles of tiny chaetae. The parapodia present on each segment are biramous except for those near the posterior end of the body which are uniramous. On the ventral side of the posterior of the body there are two chitinised calcareous plates forming a shield, the margins of which are rimmed with bundles of capillary chaetae. A number of long, semi-coiled, thread-like gills arise from the base of the shield. The deep yellow or reddish hard shield distinguishes members of this family from other worm groups.

== Behaviour ==
This worm lives submerged, head-down in the sediment, with its thread-like gills on the surface, presumably to facilitate oxygen take-up. It is a deposit feeder and the pharynx is eversible. It is presumed that the worm scoops up dollops of sediment with the pharynx and then extracts the nutrients from what is swallowed as the main bulk passes through the long, coiled gut.

== Genera ==
The World Register of Marine Species lists the following genera:-

- Caulleryaspis Sendall & Salazar-Vallejo, 2013
- Petersenaspis Sendall & Salazar-Vallejo, 2013
- Sternaspis Otto, 1820
- Schreiberius Otto, 1821
