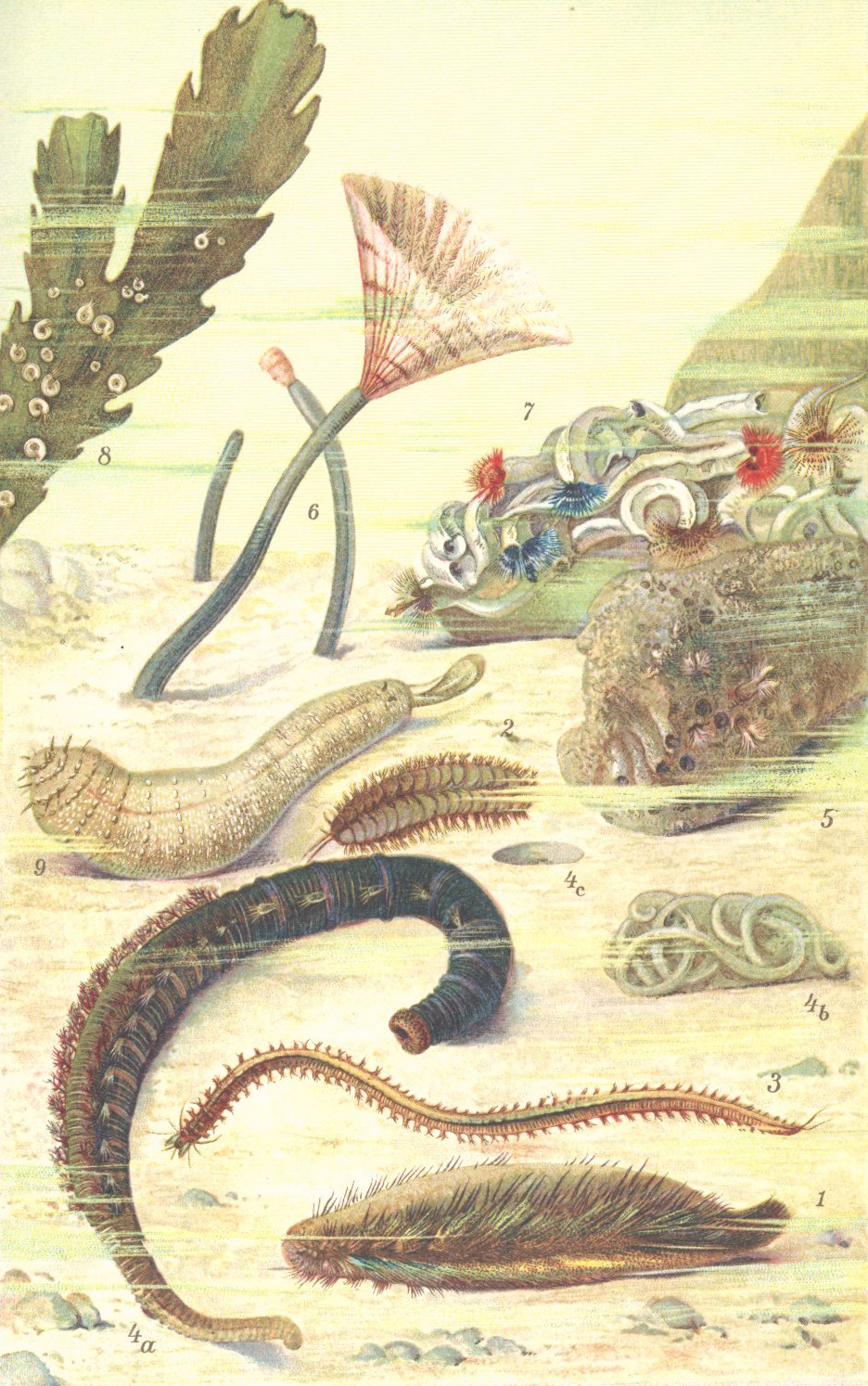
- Worms: E echiurus is at centre left

Scientific classification
- Kingdom: Animalia
- Phylum: Annelida
- Clade: Pleistoannelida
- Clade: Sedentaria
- Order: Capitellida
- Family: Thalassematidae
- Subfamily: Thalassematinae
- Tribe: Echiurini; Quatrefages, 1847
- Genus: Echiurus; Guérin-Méneville, 1831

Species
- Echiurus abyssalis; Echiurus antarcticus; Echiurus echiurus; Echiurus sitchaensis

= Echiurus =

Family of annelid worms

Echiurus is a genus of spoon worm in the tribe Echiurini.

== Species ==
The World Register of Marine Species recognises the following species in the genus:-

- Echiurus abyssalis Skorikow, 1906
- Echiurus antarcticus Spengel, 1912
- Echiurus echiurus (Pallas, 1766)
- Echiurus sitchaensis Brandt, 1835
