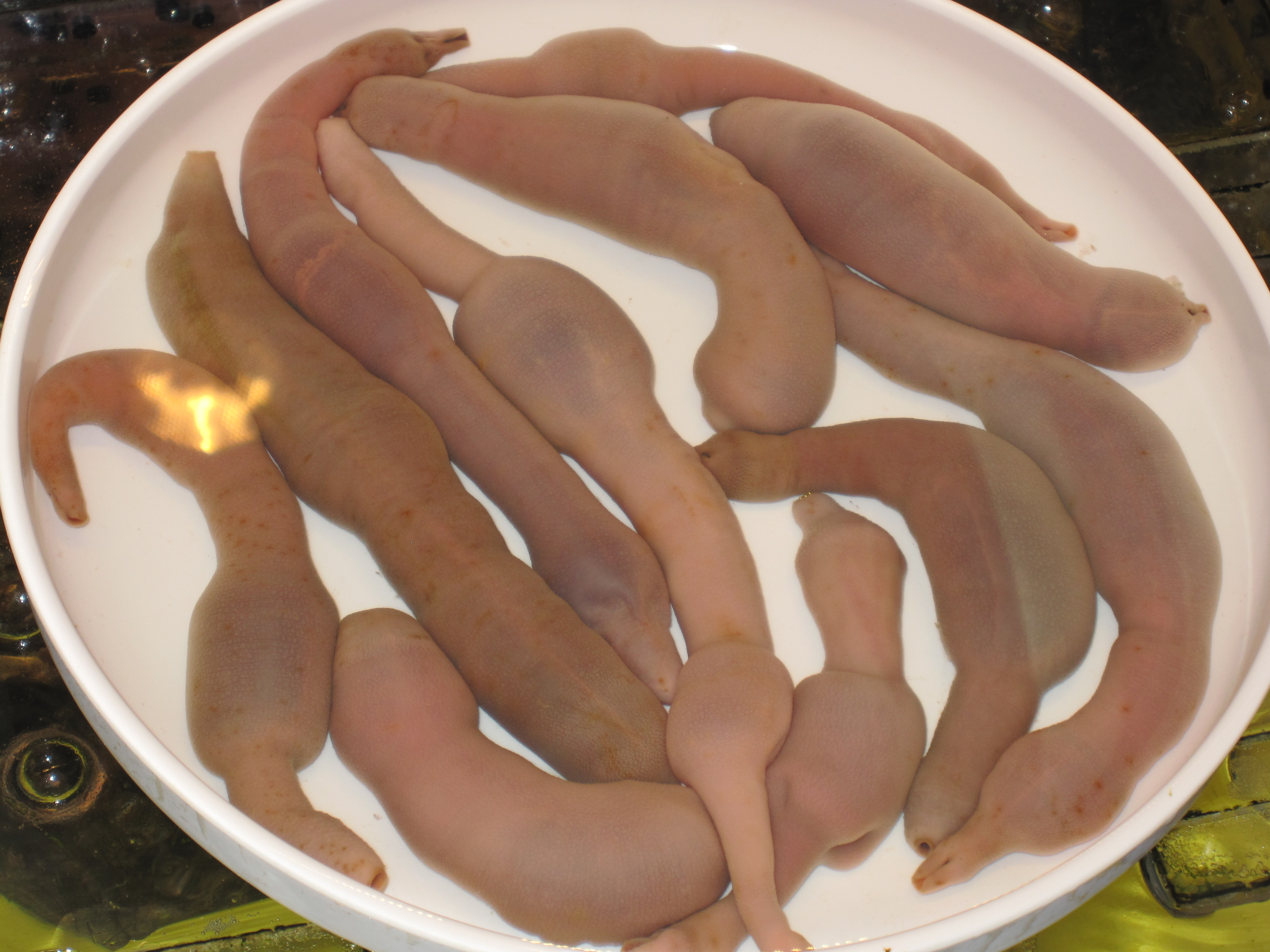
- Echiura at a market in South Korea

Scientific classification
- Kingdom: Animalia
- Phylum: Annelida
- Clade: Pleistoannelida
- Clade: Sedentaria
- Order: Capitellida
- Family: Thalassematidae
- Subfamily: Thalassematinae; Bock, 1942

Type genus
- Thalassema Pallas, 1774

Tribes
- Thalassematini; Echiurini

= Thalassematinae =

Suborder of worms

Thalassematinae is a subfamily of spoon worms, in which are contained two tribes. Unlike the Bonelliinae, they do not present any marked sexual dimorphism, making them sexually monomorphic.

== Description ==
The Thalassematinae are described as being sexually monomorphic Thalassematidae, meaning they do not show any marked sexual dimorphism. Morphologically, they have a single pair of chaetae underside side at the front, whilst their gonoducts are paired and gonostomes are basally positioned. Meanwhile, the anal vesicles are unbranched, whilst the proboscis is not split into two. It has been noted that in the tribe Thalassematini, anal chaetae are present, whilst this is not the case for members of the tribe Echiurini.

== Tribes ==
The following tribes are classified within the suborder:

- Thalassematini Forbes & Goodsir, 1841
- Echiurini Quatrefages, 1847
