= Capitellida =

Scientific classification
- Domain: Eukaryota
- Kingdom: Animalia
- Phylum: Annelida
- Clade: Pleistoannelida
- Clade: Sedentaria
- Order: Capitellida

Order of annelid worms

Capitellida is an order of marine sedentarian annelids.

Capitellida contains the following families:

- Arenicolidae Johnston, 1835
- Capitellidae Grube, 1862
- Maldanidae Malmgren, 1867
