= Linopherus =

Scientific classification
- Kingdom: Animalia
- Phylum: Annelida
- Order: Amphinomida
- Family: Amphinomidae
- Genus: Linopherus; Quatrefages, 1866

Genus of annelid worms

Linopherus is a genus of polychaetes belonging to the family Amphinomidae.

The genus has cosmopolitan distribution. They are common in shallow tropical and subtropical waters, but species have been described also from abyssal and polar areas.

== Species ==
The following species are recognised:

- Linopherus abyssalis (Fauchald, 1972)
- Linopherus acarunculatus (Monro, 1937)
- Linopherus ambigua (Monro, 1933)
- Linopherus annulata (Hartmann-Schröder, 1965)
- Linopherus beibuwanensis Sun & Li, 2016
- Linopherus brevis (Grube, 1878)
- Linopherus canariensis Langerhans, 1881
- Linopherus fauchaldi San Martín, 1986
- Linopherus hemuli (Fauchald, 1972)
- Linopherus hirsuta (Wesenberg-Lund, 1949)
- Linopherus incarunculata (Peters, 1854)
- Linopherus kristiani Salazar-Vallejo, 1987
- Linopherus microcephala (Fauvel, 1932)
- Linopherus minuta (Knox, 1960)
- Linopherus oculata (Treadwell, 1941)
- Linopherus oculifera (Augener, 1913)
- Linopherus oligobranchia (Wu, Shen & Chen, 1975)
- Linopherus paucibranchiata (Fauvel, 1932)
- Linopherus reducta (Kudenov & Blake, 1985)
- Linopherus spiralis (Wesenberg-Lund, 1949)
- Linopherus tripunctata (Kudenov, 1975)
