= Superseded combination =

Previous formal name of a species

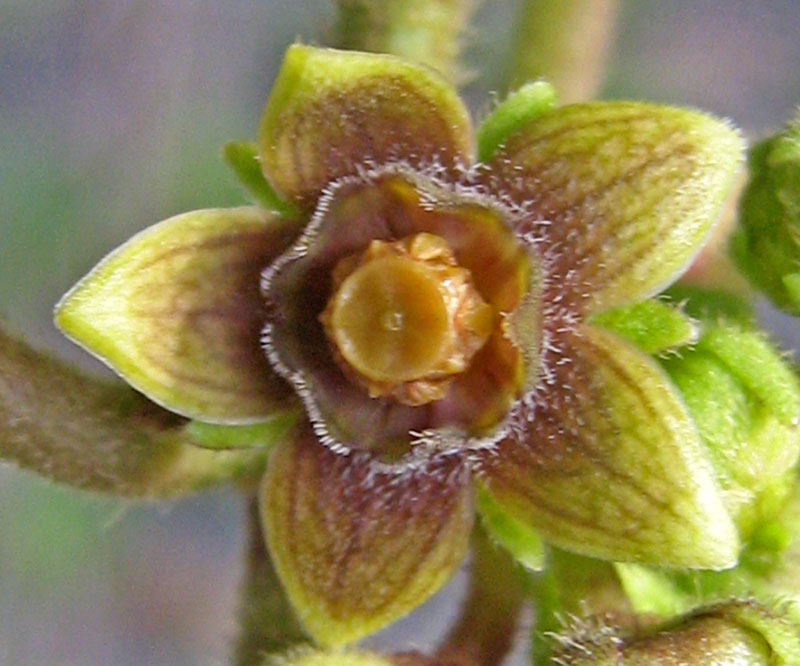
Flower of Ibatia ganglinosa. Superseded combinations for this species include Cynanchum ganglinosum, Gonolobus ganglinosus, Matelea ganglinosa, and Pseudibatia ganglinosa.

In taxonomy, a superseded combination is a scientific name that has been replaced by a new combination as a result of a species being moved to a new genus after the initial species description. The original name is called a "superseded combination", and the new name is called the "new combination" or "combinatio nova" ("comb. nov.")

Some but not all superseded combinations are basionyms, and some basionyms are not superseded combinations. In zoological nomenclature, the superseded combination is not the same as a synonym and technically should not be called that.

If the species is moved again to a third genus, both of the older names are considered superseded combinations. The original name is the superseded original combination and the second name is the superseded recombination. If the species were moved back to a previous genus, the International Commission on Zoological Nomenclature would not consider the current name to be a new combination.

The specific epithet is kept in all these name changes, with perhaps some modification of the suffix to harmonize with the genus name.

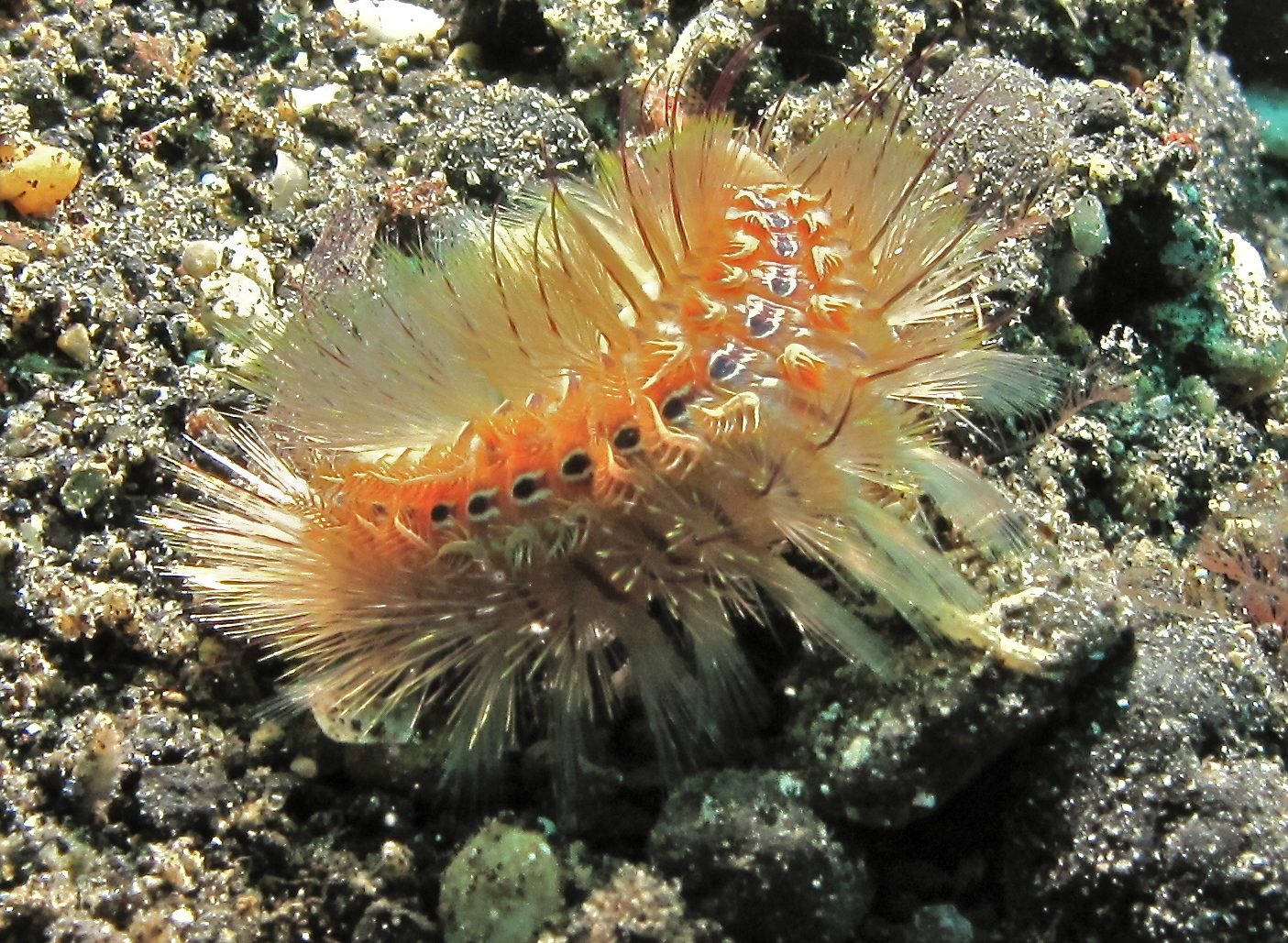
The golden fireworm, currently Chloeia flava, has the superseded combination of Aphrodita flava.

For example, in 1766 Peter Simon Pallas described a new species of marine polychaete worm he called Aphrodita flava. In 1867, that name became a superseded (original) combination when Hjalmar Kinberg moved the species to Thesmia, creating the new combination Thesmia flava. The genus Thesmia was later synonymized with Chloeia, creating a new combination of Chloeia flava. Aphrodita flava is the superseded original combination, Thesmia flava is the superseded subsequent recombination, and the current name Chloeia flava is the new combination.
