= Euphrosinella =

Scientific classification
- Kingdom: Animalia
- Phylum: Annelida
- Order: Amphinomida
- Family: Euphrosinidae
- Genus: Euphrosinella; Detinova, 1985

Genus of annelids

Euphrosinella is a genus of polychaetes belonging to the family Euphrosinidae.

== Taxonomy ==
Euphrosinella contains the following species:

- Euphrosinella cirratoformis (Averincev, 1972)
- Euphrosinella georgievae Neal et al. 2022
- Euphrosinella paucibranchiata (Hartman, 1960)
