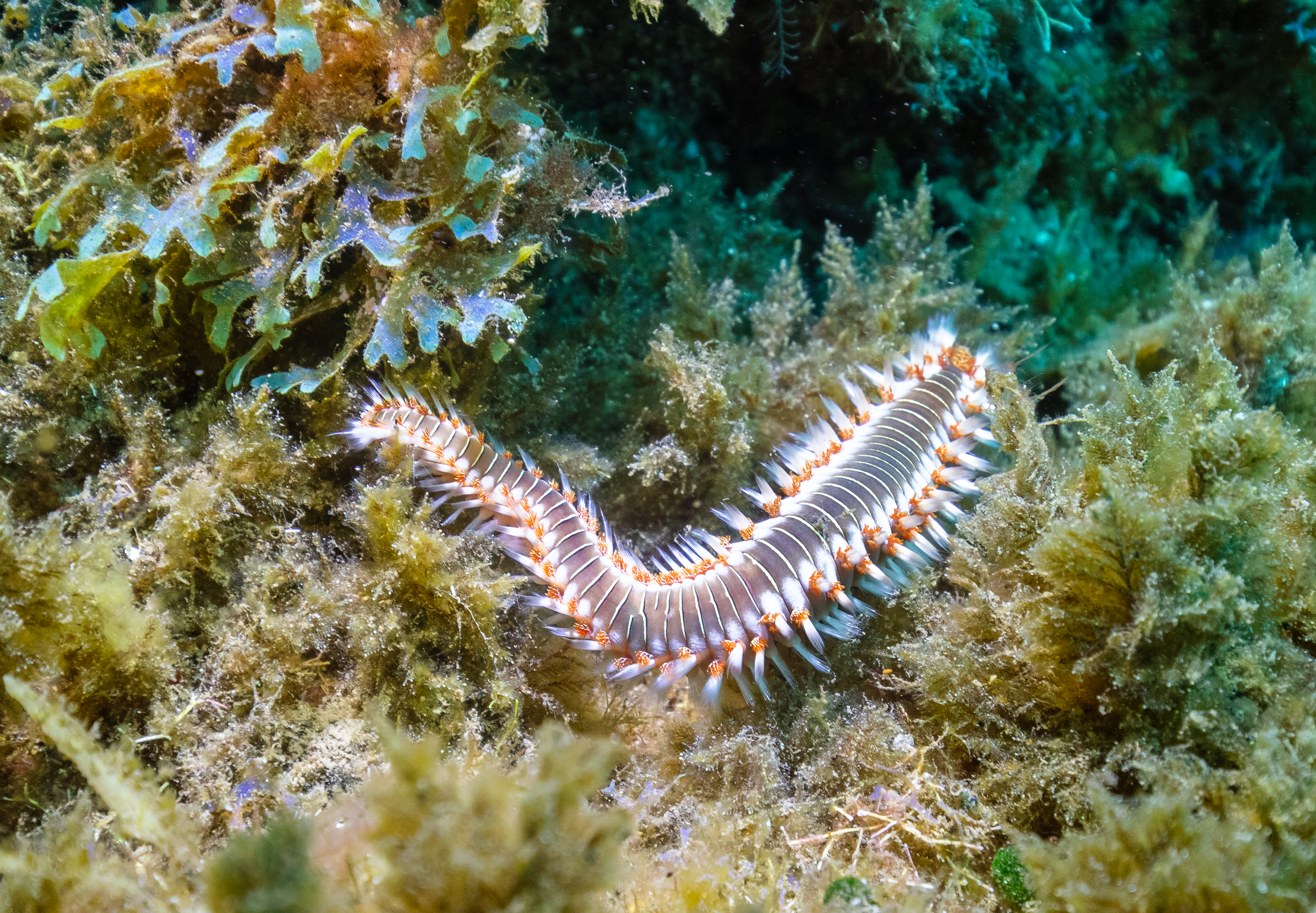
- Hermodice carunculata

Scientific classification
- Kingdom: Animalia
- Phylum: Annelida
- Order: Amphinomida
- Family: Amphinomidae
- Genus: Hermodice; Kinberg, 1857

= Hermodice =

Genus of annelid worms

Hermodice is a genus of annelids belonging to the family Amphinomidae.

The genus has almost cosmopolitan distribution.

== Species ==
There are four recognised species:

- Hermodice carunculata (Pallas, 1766)
- Hermodice sanguinea (Schmarda, 1861)
- Hermodice savignyi (Brulle, 1832)
- Hermodice smaragdina (Schmarda, 1861)
