= Palmyreuphrosyne =

Scientific classification
- Kingdom: Animalia
- Phylum: Annelida
- Order: Amphinomida
- Family: Euphrosinidae
- Genus: Palmyreuphrosyne; Fauvel, 1913

Genus of annelids

Palmyreuphrosyne is a genus of polychaetes belonging to the family Euphrosinidae.

== Taxonomy ==
Palmyreuphrosyne contains the following species:

- Palmyreuphrosyne pacifica Augener, 1924
- Palmyreuphrosyne paradoxa Fauvel, 1913
