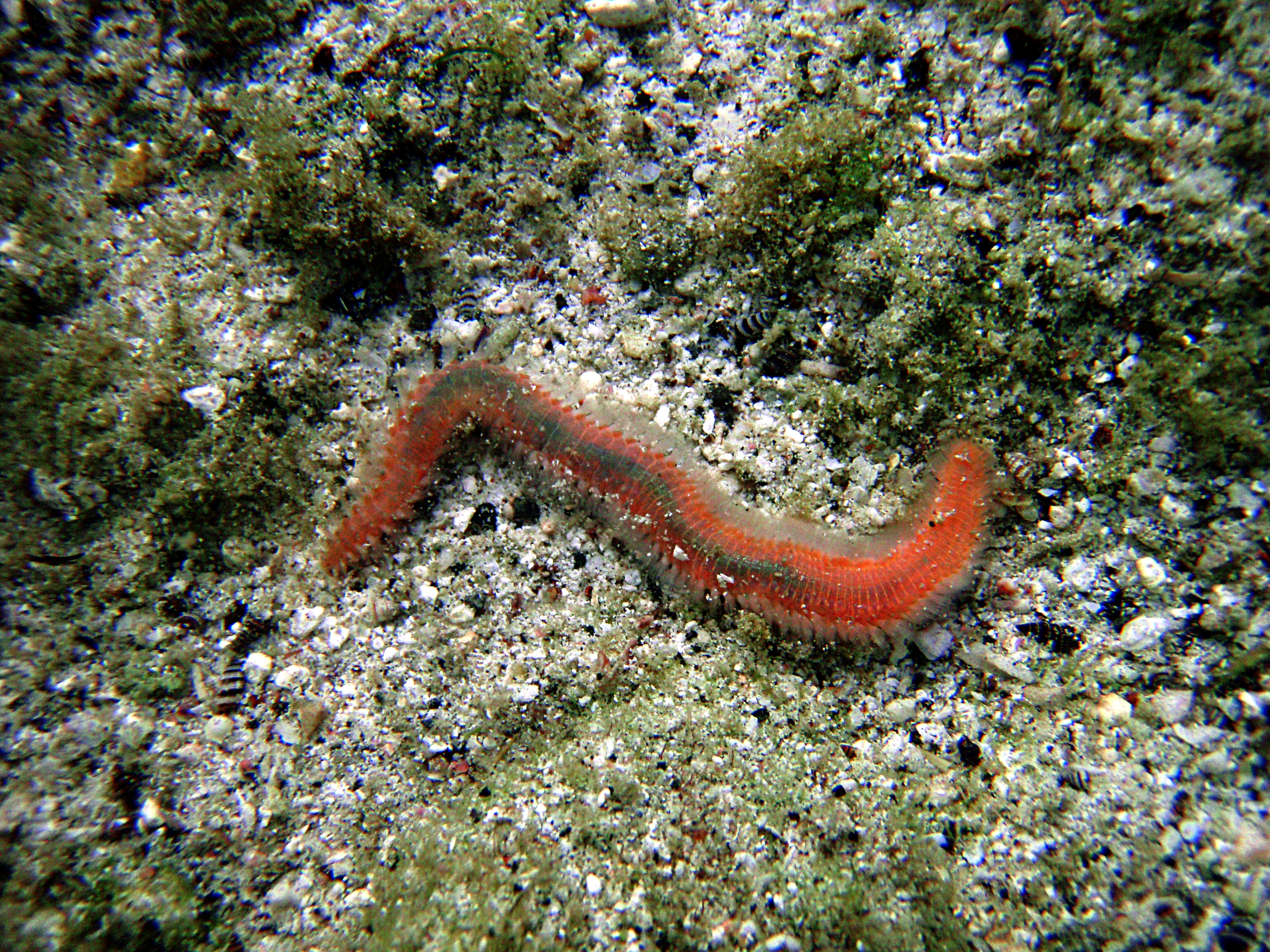
- Eurythoe complanata

Scientific classification
- Kingdom: Animalia
- Phylum: Annelida
- Order: Amphinomida
- Family: Amphinomidae
- Genus: Eurythoe; Kinberg, 1857

= Eurythoe (annelid) =

Genus of annelid worms

Eurythoe is a genus of polychaetes belonging to the family Amphinomidae.

The genus has almost cosmopolitan distribution.

== Species ==
The following species are recognised:

- Eurythoe brasiliensis Hansen, 1882
- Eurythoe clavata Baird, 1868
- Eurythoe complanata (Pallas, 1766)
- Eurythoe dubia Horst, 1912
- Eurythoe encopochaeta (Schmarda, 1861)
- Eurythoe hedenborgi Kinberg, 1857
- Eurythoe heterotricha Potts, 1909
- Eurythoe indica (Schmarda, 1861)
- Eurythoe karachiensis Bindra, 1927
- Eurythoe laevisetis Fauvel, 1914
- Eurythoe longicirra (Schmarda, 1861)
- Eurythoe matthaii Bindra, 1927
- Eurythoe paupera (Grube, 1856)
- Eurythoe rullieri Fauvel, 1953
- Eurythoe syriaca Kinberg, 1857

Eurythoe latissima (Schmarda, 1861) is a taxon inquirendum.
