= Euphrosinopsis =

Scientific classification
- Kingdom: Animalia
- Phylum: Annelida
- Order: Amphinomida
- Family: Euphrosinidae
- Genus: Euphrosinopsis; Lamarck, 1818

Genus of annelids

Euphrosinopsis is a genus of polychaetes belonging to the family Euphrosinidae.

== Taxonomy ==
Euphrosinopsis contains the following species:

- Euphrosinopsis ahearni Neal et al., 2022
- Euphrosinopsis antarctica (Hartmann-Schröder & Rosenfeldt, 1992)
- Euphrosinopsis crassiseta Kudenov, 1993
- Euphrosinopsis halli Neal et al., 2022
- Euphrosinopsis horsti Kudenov, 1993
