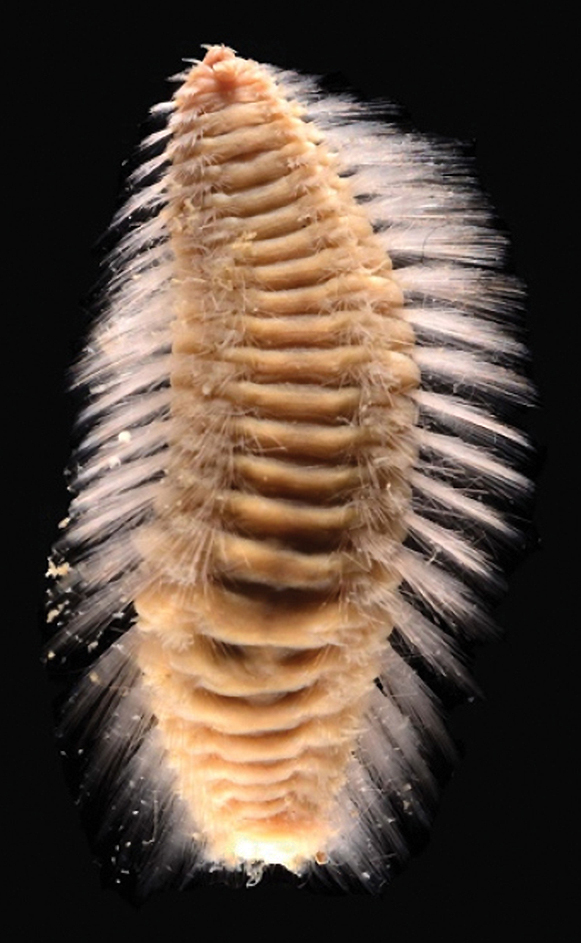
- Benthoscolex seisuiae

Scientific classification
- Kingdom: Animalia
- Phylum: Annelida
- Order: Amphinomida
- Family: Amphinomidae
- Genus: Benthoscolex; Horst, 1912

Type species
- Benthoscolex coecus Horst, 1912

Species
- 4 species (see text)

= Benthoscolex =

Genus of annelids

Benthoscolex is a genus of fireworms belonging to the family Amphinomidae. The genus contains four species.

Members of the genus have a flat, fusiform body and lack eyes. They are known mainly from deep-sea substrates.

== Species ==
The following species are recognised:

- Benthoscolex coecus Horst, 1912 – Red Sea to the South Western Pacific Ocean
- Benthoscolex cubanus Hartman, 1942 – Caribbean Sea
- Benthoscolex microcarunculata (Treadwell, 1901)
- Benthoscolex seisuiae Jimi, Kimura, Ogawa & Kajihara, 2018 – Kumano Sea, Japan
