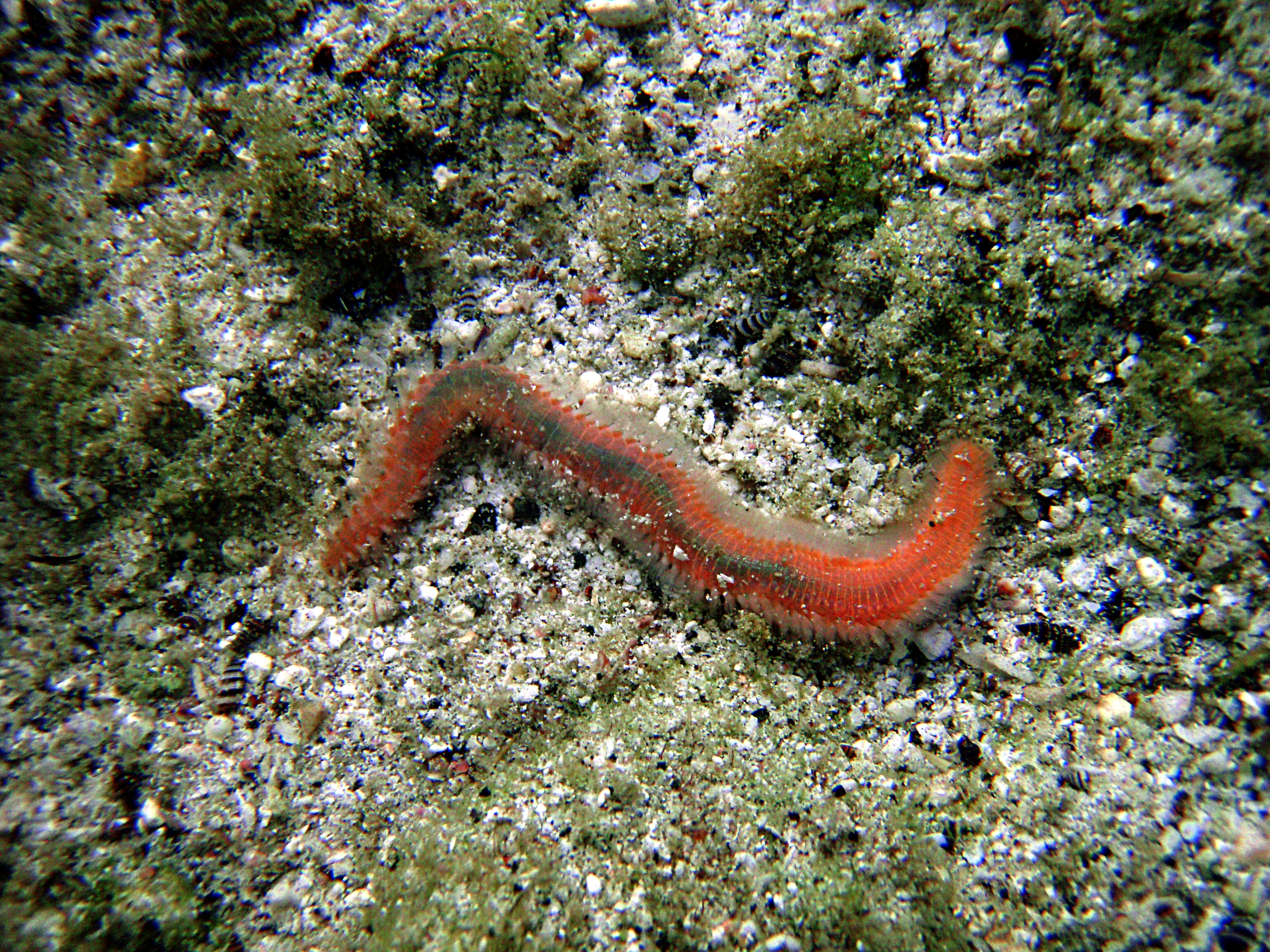

Scientific classification
- Kingdom: Animalia
- Phylum: Annelida
- Order: Amphinomida
- Family: Amphinomidae
- Genus: Eurythoe
- Species: E. complanata

Binomial name
- Eurythoe complanata (Pallas, 1766)

= Eurythoe complanata =

Species of polychaete

Eurythoe complanata, the iridescent fireworm, is a species of polychaetes belonging to the family Amphinomidae. It inhabits coral reefs, such as Heliopora reefs, in the Marshall Islands. It is typically found in shallow, warm tropical waters near rocks and coral.

== Description ==
The iridescent fireworm can be found in colors that vary from gray to green to pink. This species can grow to be up to 6 in (150 mm) long. It has tufted branchiae, used for respiration, starting on the second segment of its body and is located along the rest of the body. This species also has bristles along its body that produce a quaternary ammonium toxin that “stings”. It uses this toxin, complanine, as a defense mechanism against different predators and can also use into stun prey. It is a carnivorous species feeding on sponges, coral, mollusks, and even other worms. It can ingest its food all at once by expanding its lip by 4-5 times longer. It reproduces both sexually and asexually, by regeneration.

== Distribution and habitat ==
Eurythoe complanata can be found in most warm, tropical and subtropical waters. This includes areas such as the Indo-Pacific, the Atlantic Ocean, and the Mediterranean Sea. This species can be found up to depths of 1,100 m (3,600 ft). It is usually found in shallow waters near rocks, boulders, coral, and even in small rock pools.
