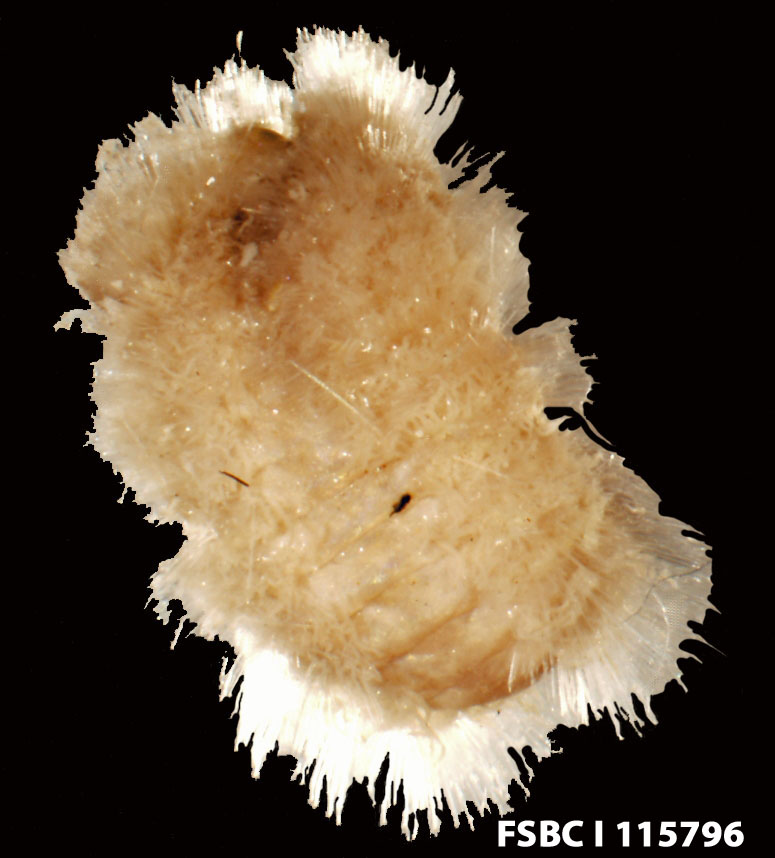
- Euphrosine triloba

Scientific classification
- Kingdom: Animalia
- Phylum: Annelida
- Order: Amphinomida
- Family: Euphrosinidae
- Genus: Euphrosine; Lamarck, 1818

= Euphrosine (annelid) =

Genus of annelids

Euphrosine is a genus of polychaetes belonging to the family Euphrosinidae.

== Description ==
The genus lives in marine benthic environments and has cosmopolitan distribution.

== Etymology ==
The name is from Greek Euphrosyne, meaning merriment; she was one of the three Graces.

== Taxonomy ==
Euphrosine contains the following species:

- Euphrosine abyssalis Kudenov, 1993
- Euphrosine affinis Horst, 1903
- Euphrosine arctia Johnson, 1897
- [?] Euphrosine arctica
- Euphrosine armadillo Sars, 1851
- Euphrosine armadilloides Ehlers, 1900
- Euphrosine armata Kudenov, 1993
- Euphrosine aurantiaca Johnson, 1897
- [?] Euphrosine balani
- Euphrosine bicirrata Moore, 1905
- Euphrosine borealis Örsted, 1843
- Euphrosine calypta Essenberg, 1917
- Euphrosine capensis Kinberg, 1857
- Euphrosine ceylonica Michaelsen, 1892
- Euphrosine cirrata Sars, 1862
- Euphrosine cirrataepropinqua Amoureux, 1982
- Euphrosine cirribranchis Hartmann-Schröder & Rosenfeldt, 1992
- Euphrosine digitalis Imajima, 2009
- Euphrosine dumosa Moore, 1911
- Euphrosine echidna Kudenov, 1993
- Euphrosine filosa Edwards, 1833
- Euphrosine foliosa Audouin & H Milne Edwards, 1833
- Euphrosine globosa Horst, 1912
- Euphrosine heterobranchia Johnson, 1901
- Euphrosine hortensis Moore, 1905
- Euphrosine hystrix Horst, 1903
- Euphrosine keldyshi Detinova, 1986
- Euphrosine laureata Lamarck, 1818 [or Savigny, in]
- Euphrosine limbata Moore, 1911
- Euphrosine longesetosa Horst, 1903
- Euphrosine maculata Horst, 1903
- Euphrosine magellanica Ehlers, 1900
- Euphrosine maorica Augener, 1924
- Euphrosine mastersi Haswell, 1878
- Euphrosine monroi Kudenov, 1993
- Euphrosine mucosa Horst, 1903
- Euphrosine multibranchiata Essenberg, 1917
- Euphrosine myrtosa Lamarck, 1818 [or Savigny, in]
- Euphrosine notialis Ehlers, 1900
- Euphrosine obiensis Horst, 1903
- Euphrosine orientalis Gustafson, 1930
- Euphrosine panamica Chamberlin, 1919
- Euphrosine pelagica Horst, 1903
- Euphrosine pilosa Horst, 1903
- Euphrosine polyclada Imajima, 2003
- Euphrosine pseudonotialis Imajima, 2009
- Euphrosine ramosa Imajima, 2003
- Euphrosine samoana Augener, 1927
- Euphrosine setosissima Ehlers, 1900
- Euphrosine sibogae Horst, 1903
- Euphrosine superba Marenzeller, 1879
- Euphrosine tosaensis Imajima, 2001
- Euphrosine triloba Ehlers, 1887
- Euphrosine tripartita Hoagland, 1920
- Euphrosine uruguayensis Rullier & Amoureux, 1979
- Euphrosine zaveruchi (Averincev, 1972)
