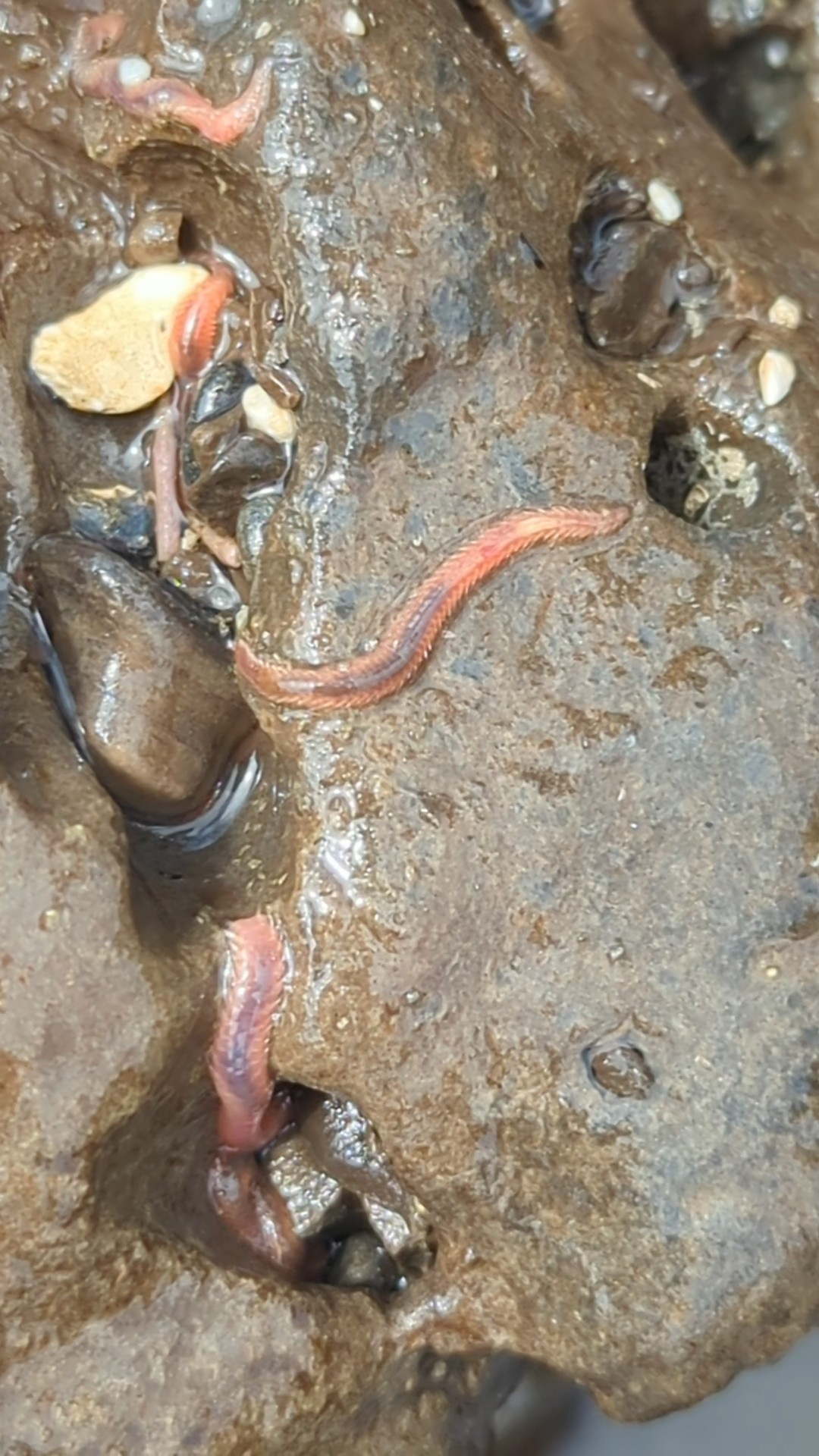

Scientific classification
- Kingdom: Animalia
- Phylum: Annelida
- Order: Amphinomida
- Family: Amphinomidae
- Genus: Pareurythoe
- Species: P. californica

Binomial name
- Pareurythoe californica (Johnson, 1897)

Synonyms
- Eurythoe californica Johnson, 1897

= Pareurythoe californica =

Species of polychaete

Pareurythoe californica is a species of bristle worm found in the rocky intertidal of the Eastern Pacific, particularly in California.

== Description ==
Pareurythoe californica has a long and gradually tapered body that is flat dorsally and square in its cross-section. As members of the family Amphinomidae, P. californica bears distinctive chaetae (bristles) that project laterally from its body. These give the organism a hairy appearance, and inspire common names like bristle worm and sea mouse. The chaetae are used as a defense mechanism and a deterrent to predators, and they can induce irritation in humans when touched.

== Life cycle ==
P. californica are gonochoric. Eggs are produced in the worm's nephridium, and after they are fertilized, they develop into planktonic larvae, which metamorphose into a juvenile stage before reaching the adult stage.

== Ecology ==
P. californica can be described as both a predator and a scavenger. It feeds on a variety of organic materials, including detritus, algae, and occasionally small invertebrates. Additionally, it can obtain nutrients by absorbing amino acids from seawater.
