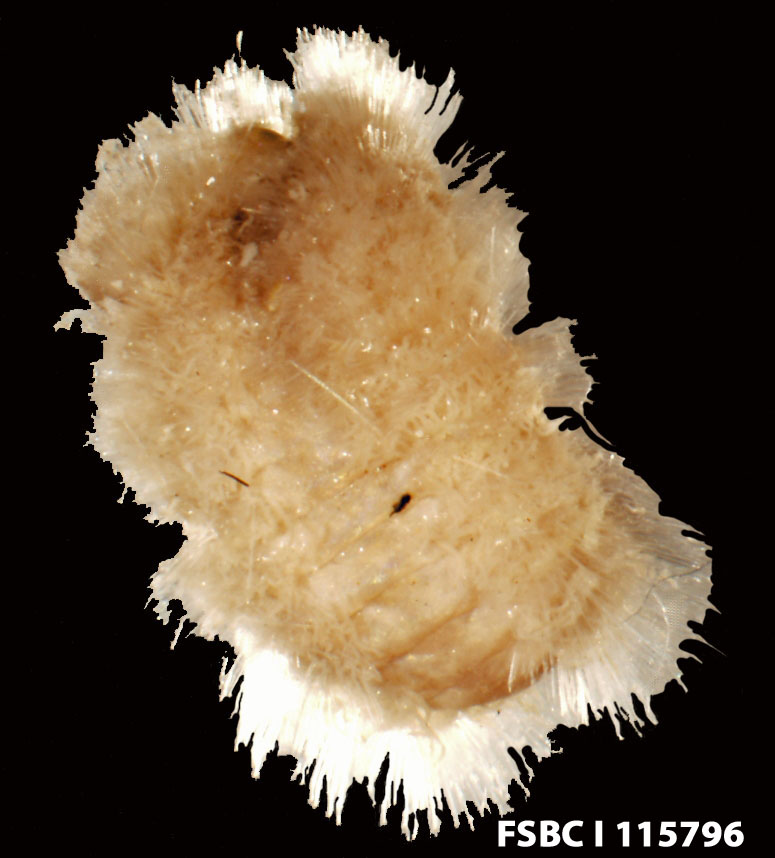
- Euphrosine triloba

Scientific classification
- Domain: Eukaryota
- Kingdom: Animalia
- Phylum: Annelida
- Class: Polychaeta
- Order: Amphinomida
- Family: Euphrosinidae; Williams, 1852

= Euphrosinidae =

Family of annelids

The Euphrosinidae are a family of polychaete worms. The name is from Greek Euphrosyne, meaning merriment; she was one of the three Graces.

Clade

- Amphinomida
  - Euphrosinidae
    - Euphrosine
    - Euphrosinella
    - Euphrosinopsis
    - Palmyreuphrosyne
  - Amphinomidae

== Species ==
Euphrosinidae contains the following genera

- Euphrosine Lamarck, 1818 (many species) (Note: A Fauchald, K. (1977) refers to Euphrosine as first described by Savigny, 1818 instead of Lamarck, 1818.)
- Euphrosinella Detinova, 1985 (3 species)
- Euphrosinopsis Kudenov, 1993 (5 species).
- Palmyreuphrosyne Fauvel, 1913 (2 species)
