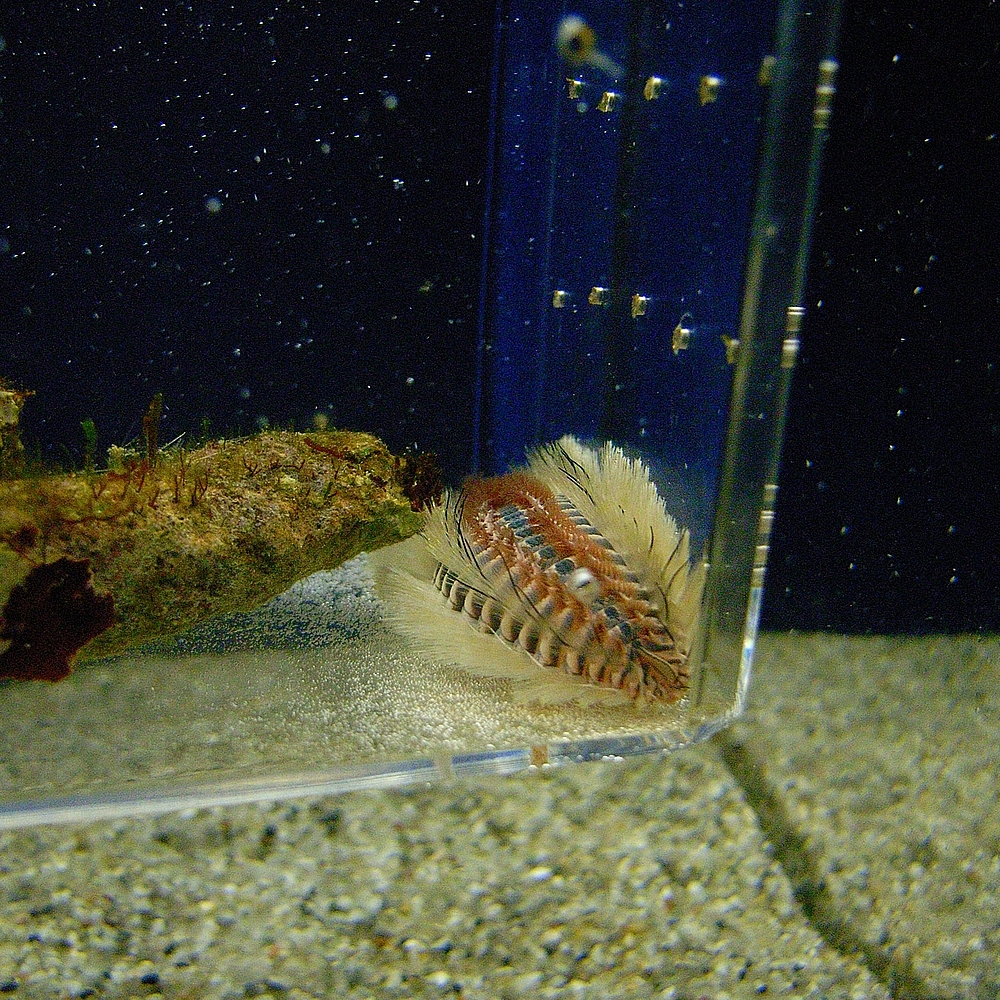

Scientific classification
- Kingdom: Animalia
- Phylum: Annelida
- Order: Amphinomida
- Family: Amphinomidae
- Genus: Chloeia
- Species: C. flava

Binomial name
- Chloeia flava (Pallas, 1766)

= Chloeia flava =

Species of annelid worm

Chloeia flava, also known as the golden fireworm, is a segmented bristleworm belonging to the family Amphinomidae.

== Description ==
The golden fireworm has an elongated body. Its size varies between 7 and 10 cm (2.8 and 3.9 in) long, and between 1.8 and 2.5 cm (0.7 and 1.0 in) wide, excluding bristles. Its coloration is red-brown to light brown with sometime a light color band in the middle of the body. The body is made of 37 visible segments, each of them has a distinctive ocelli, which is purple or dark color with a white outline and placed in the middle of the upper side. Small gills, white to deep brown, are present on both external sides of the back just before the bristles and on almost all the segments. The body is covered laterally with calcareous spines or setae, they have bristle aspect which are whitish, fine, sharp and venomous.

== Distribution and habitat ==
Chloeia flava is widely distributed through the Indo-Pacific area from the east coast of Africa, including the Red Sea, to the Pacific Ocean's islands except Hawaii and Polynesia. It is found in sandy to silty detrital areas close by the reef.

== Biology ==
This worm is an active carnivore, especially at dawn and dusk. Its diet consists of coral polyps, sponges, sea anemones, hydroids and tunicates.
