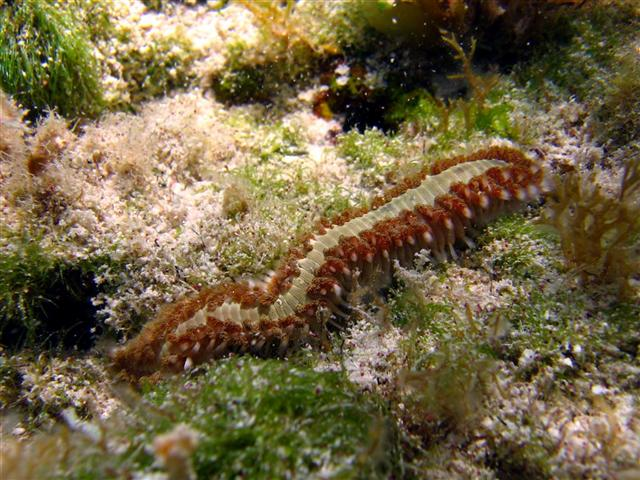
- Hermodice carunculata

Scientific classification
- Kingdom: Animalia
- Phylum: Annelida
- Order: Amphinomida
- Family: Amphinomidae

= Amphinomidae =

Amphinomidae Temporal range: Carboniferous – Recent

Family of annelids

Amphinomidae, also known as the fireworms, bristle worms or sea mice, are a family of marine polychaetes, many species of which bear chaetae mineralized with carbonate. The best-known amphinomids are the fireworms, which can cause great pain if their toxin-coated chaetae are touched or trodden on. Their relationship to other polychaete groups is somewhat poorly resolved.

== Complanine ==
Complanine is a quaternary ammonium salt that has been isolated from the marine fireworm Eurythoe complanata. It causes an inflammatory effect upon contact with the skin or mucous membranes.

It was previously known that handling the fireworm caused it to release a chemical that induces inflammation of the skin of marine predators and mammals (including humans). Complanine was the first compound isolated from the fireworm which causes these effects. It is presumed that this compound's function is to deter predators of the fireworm.

== Species ==
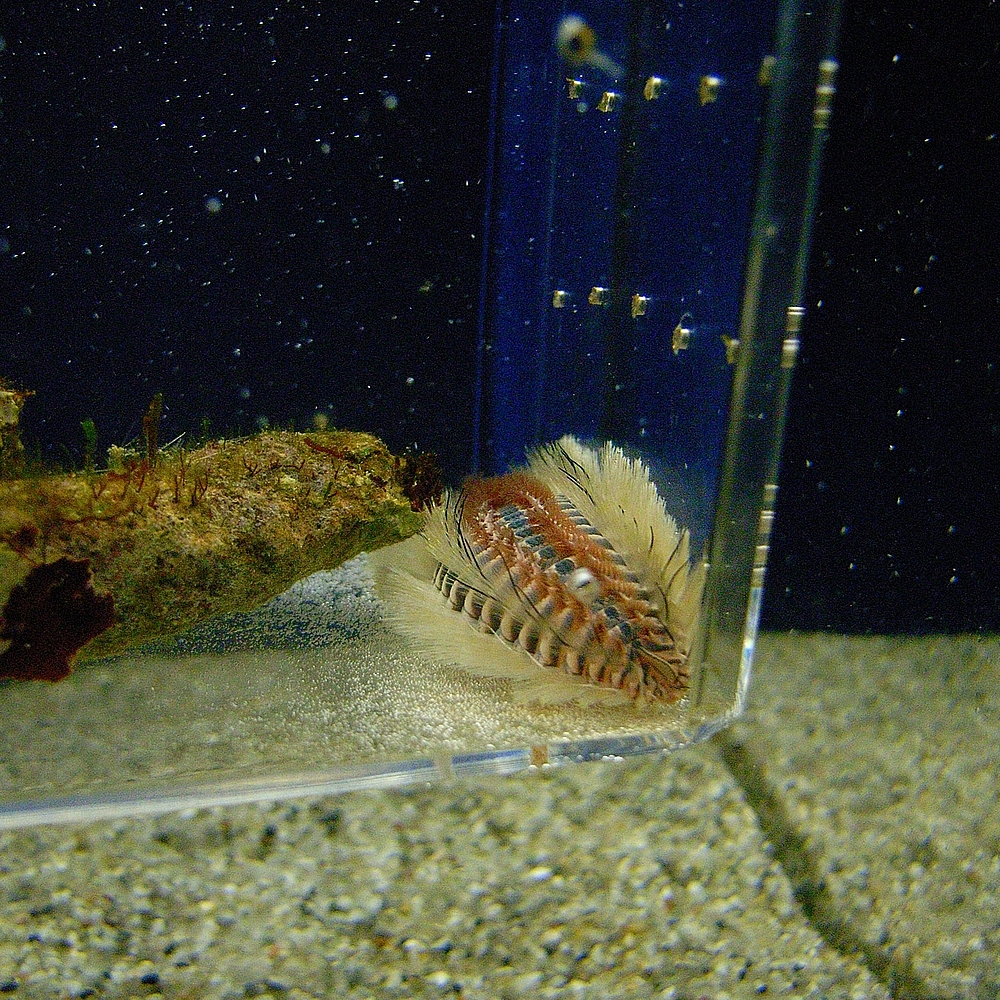
Chloeia flava

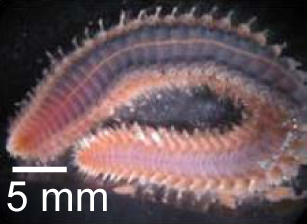
Cryptonome conclava

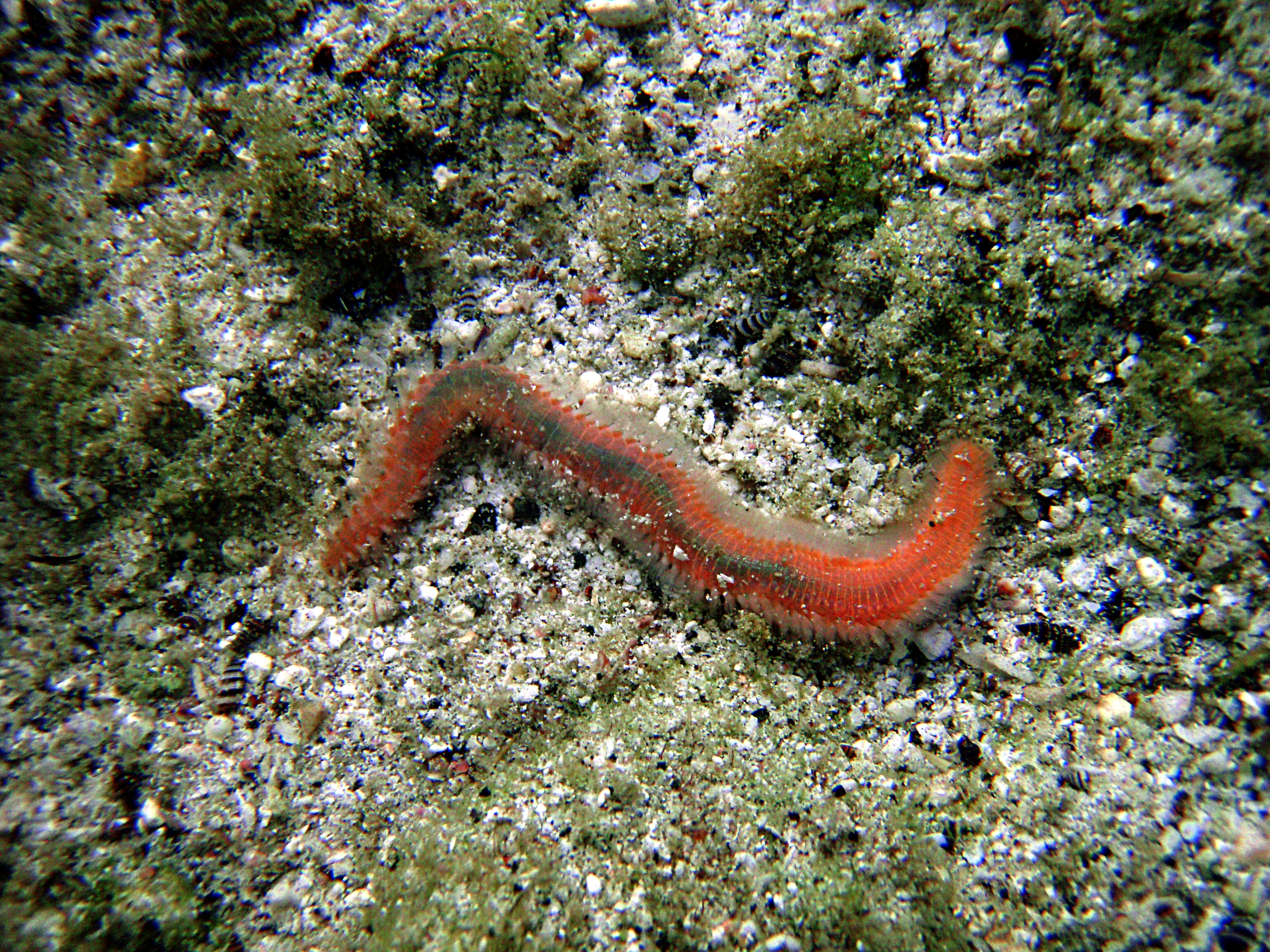
Eurythoe complanata

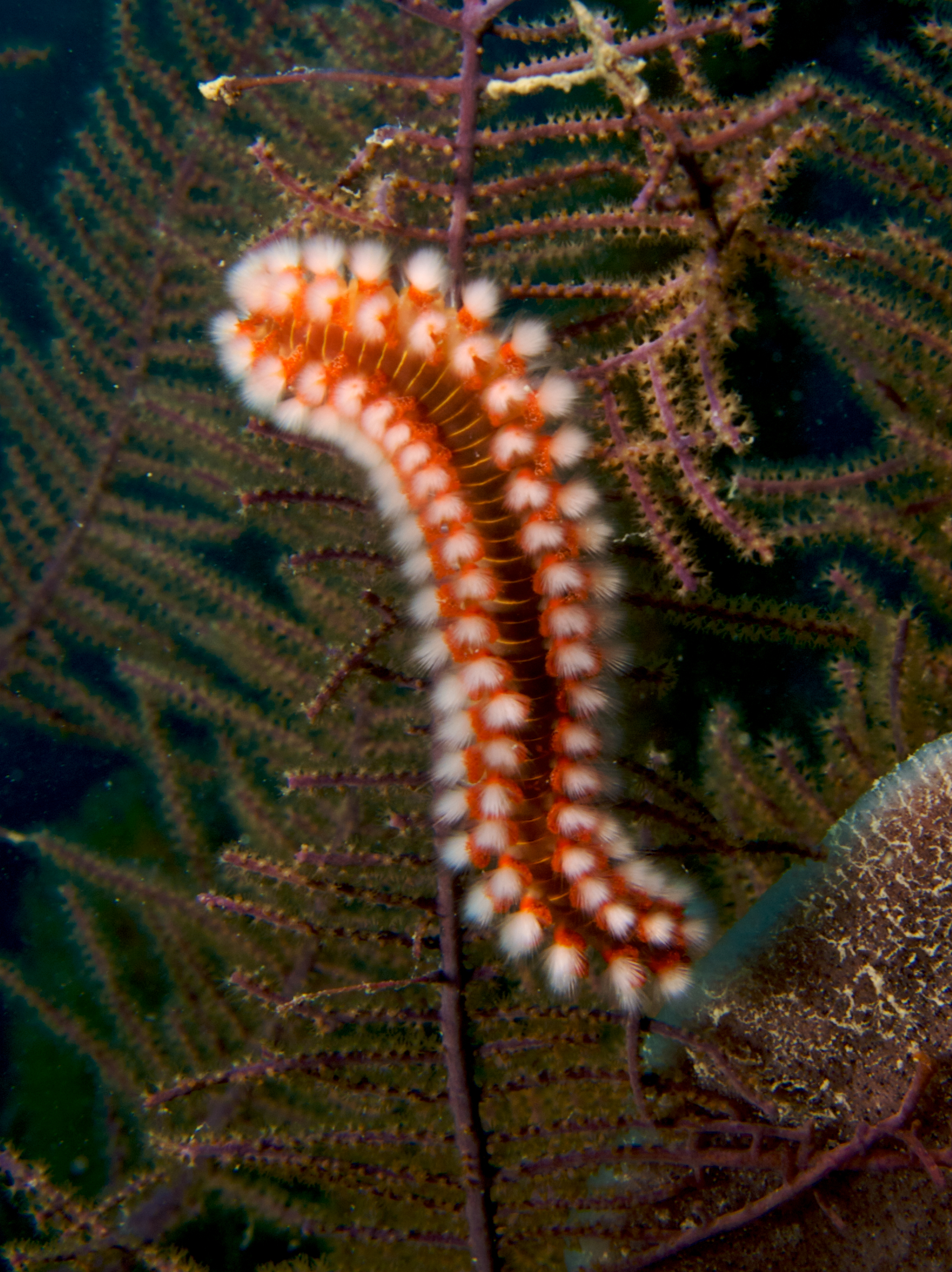
Hermodice carunculata

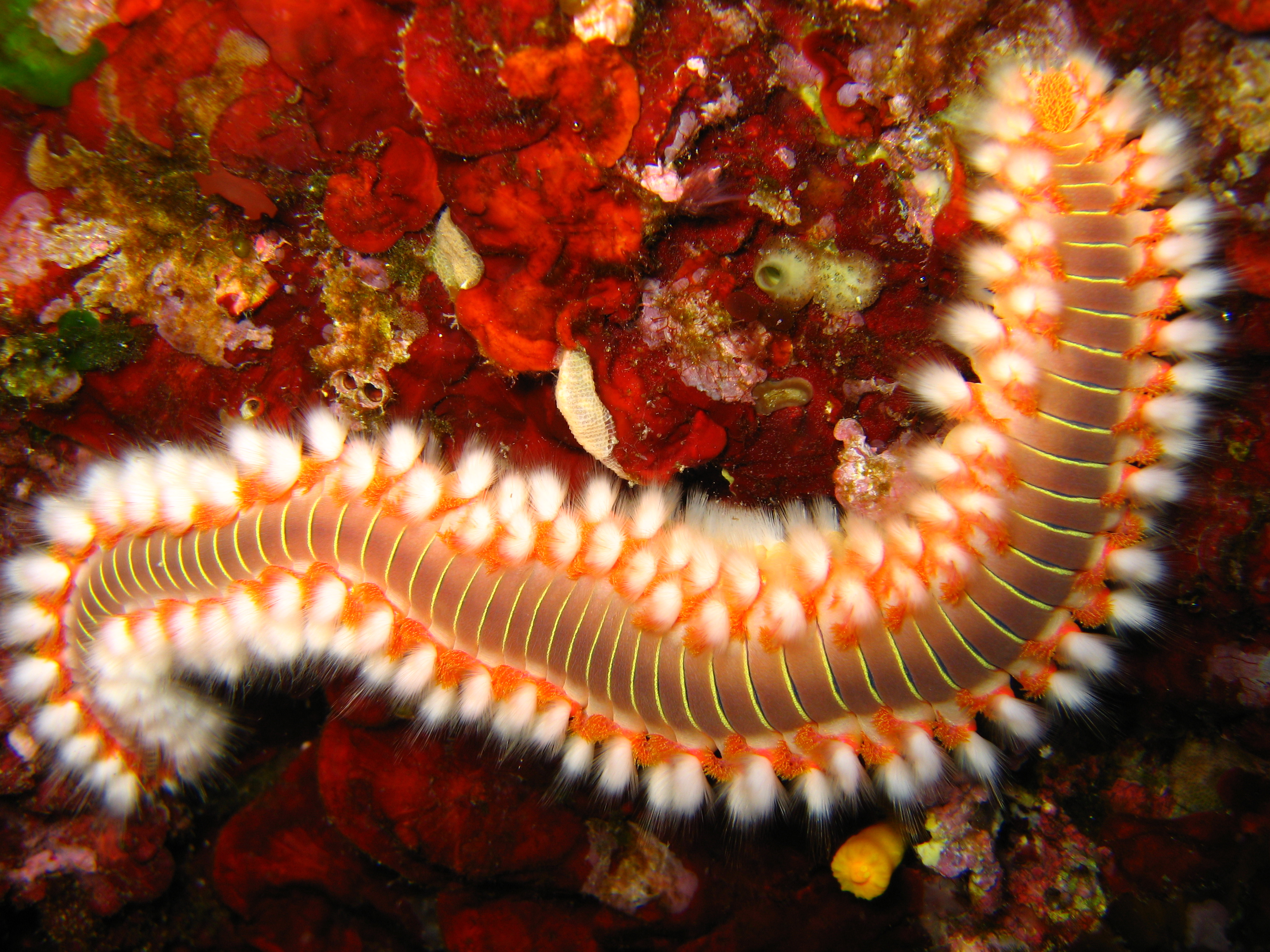
Hermodice carunculata

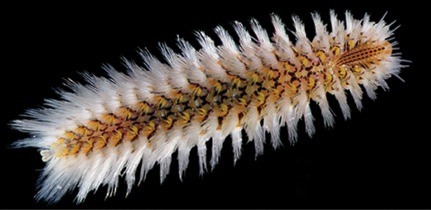
Notopygos ornata

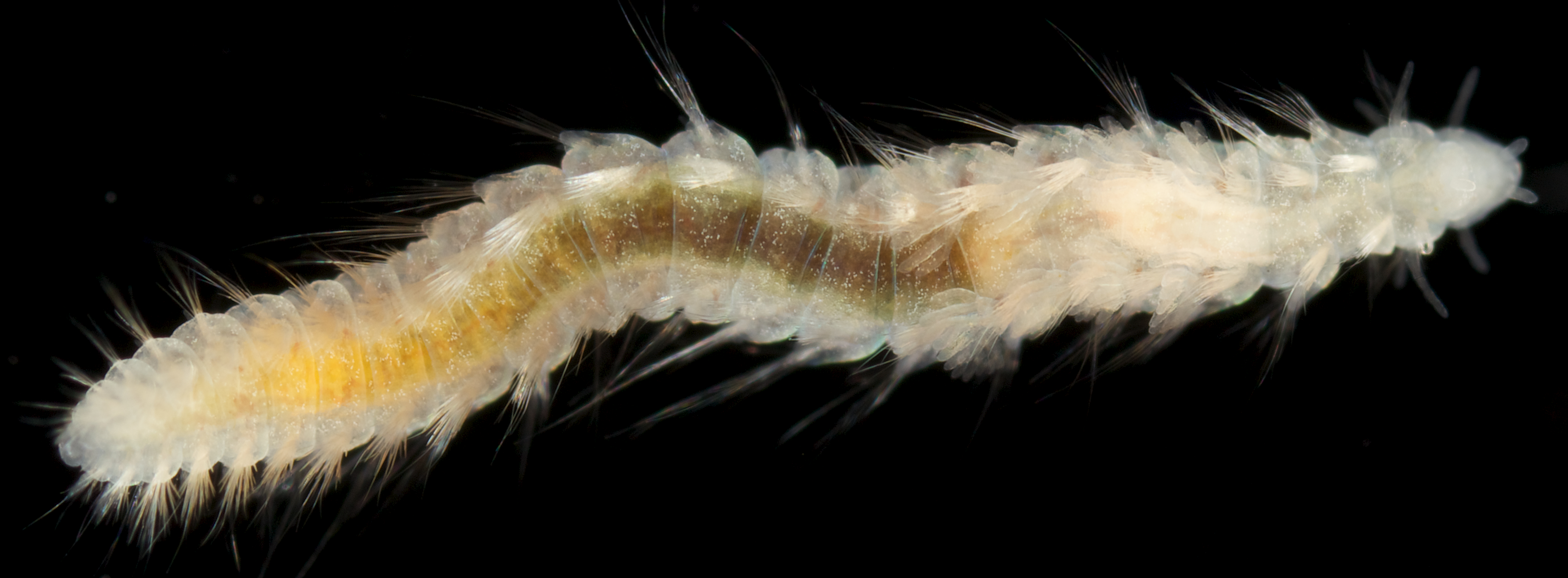
Paramphinome jeffreysii

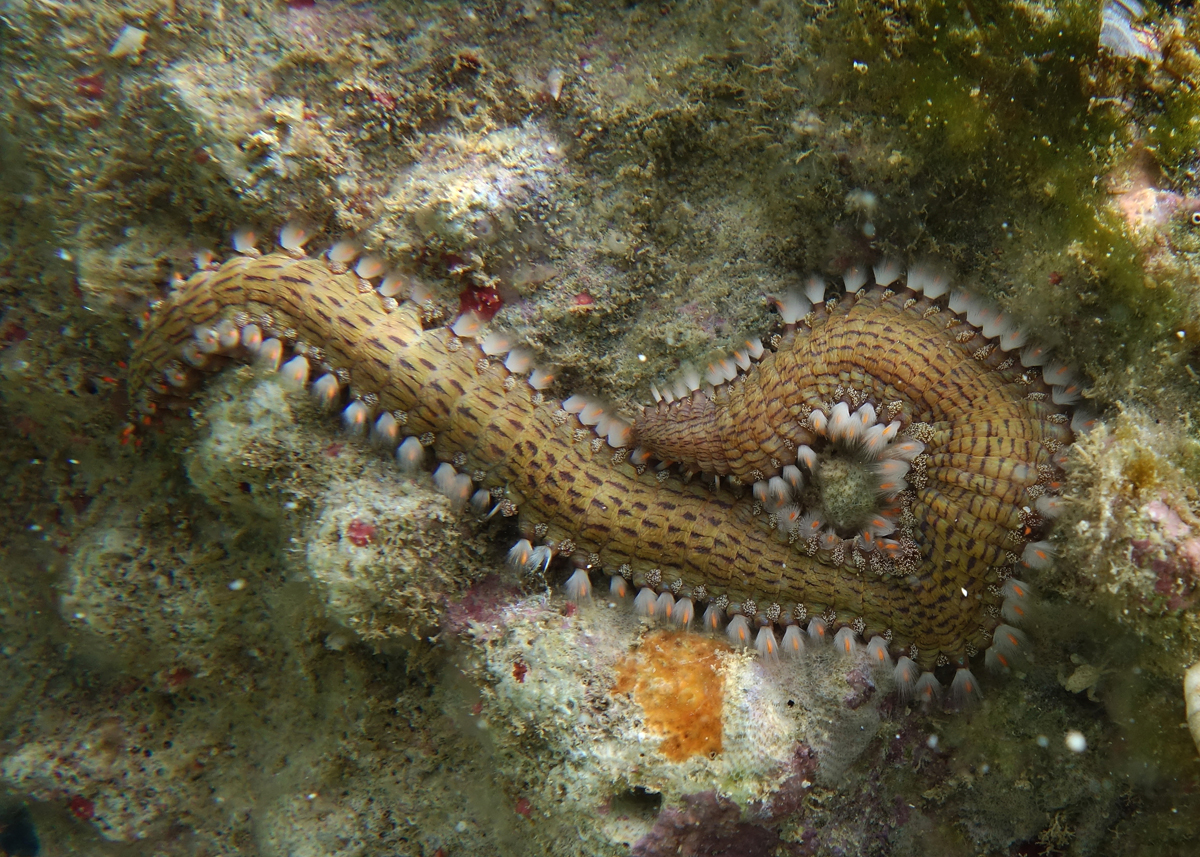
Pherecardia striata

Most genera in Amphinomidae are divided into two subfamilies: Amphinominae, and Archinominae. (Note: A binomial authority in parentheses indicates that the species was originally described in a genus other than the present genus.)

- Ankitokazoa Alessandrello & Bracchi, 2005†
  - Ankitokazoa bezanozanoi Alessandrello & Bracchi, 2005†
- Bathynotopygos Kucheruk, 1981
  - Bathynotopygos abyssalis Kucheruk, 1981
- Pherecardites Horst, 1912
  - Pherecardites parva Horst, 1912
  - Pherecardites quinquemaculata Augener, 1927
- Sangiria Horst, 1911
  - Sangiria hystrix Horst, 1911
- Zothea Risso, 1826
  - Zothea meridionalis Risso, 1826

=== Amphinominae Lamarck, 1818 ===
- Alleurythoe Sun & Li, 2017
  - Alleurythoe tenuichaeta Sun & Li, 2017
- Amphinome Bruguière, 1789
  - Amphinome bruguieresi Quatrefages, 1866
  - Amphinome carnea Grube, 1856
  - Amphinome nigrobranchiata Horst, 1912
  - Amphinome praelonga Haswell, 1878
  - Amphinome rostrata (Pallas, 1766)
  - Amphinome savignyi Brulle, 1832
  - Amphinome stylifera Grube, 1860
  - Amphinome umbo Grube, 1870
  - Amphinome vagans (Savigny, 1822)
- Benthoscolex Horst, 1912
  - Benthoscolex coecus Horst, 1912
  - Benthoscolex cubanus Hartman, 1942
  - Benthoscolex microcarunculata (Treadwell, 1901)
  - Benthoscolex seisuiae Jimi, Kimura, Ogawa & Kajihara, 2018
- Branchamphinome Hartman, 1967
  - Branchamphinome antarctica Hartman, 1967
  - Branchamphinome islandica Detinova, 1986
  - Branchamphinome tropicalis Barroso, Ranauro & Kudenov, 2017
- Cryptonome Borda, Kudenov, Bienhold & Rouse, 2012
  - Cryptonome barbada Barroso, Kudenov, Halanych, Saeedi, Sumida & Bernardino, 2018
  - Cryptonome conclava Borda, Kudenov, Bienhold & Rouse, 2012
  - Cryptonome parvecarunculata (Horst, 1912)
  - Cryptonome turcica (Çinar, 2008)
- Eurythoe Kinberg, 1857
  - Eurythoe brasiliensis Hansen, 1882
  - Eurythoe clavata Baird, 1868
  - Eurythoe complanata (Pallas, 1766)
  - Eurythoe dubia Horst, 1912
  - Eurythoe encopochaeta (Schmarda, 1861)
  - Eurythoe hedenborgi Kinberg, 1857
  - Eurythoe indica (Schmarda, 1861)
  - Eurythoe karachiensis Bindra, 1927
  - Eurythoe laevisetis Fauvel, 1914
  - Eurythoe longicirra (Schmarda, 1861)
  - Eurythoe matthaii Bindra, 1927
  - Eurythoe paupera (Grube, 1856)
  - Eurythoe rullieri Fauvel, 1953
  - Eurythoe syriaca Kinberg, 1857
- Hermodice Kinberg, 1857
  - Hermodice carunculata (Pallas, 1766)
  - Hermodice sanguinea (Schmarda, 1861)
  - Hermodice savignyi (Brulle, 1832)
  - Hermodice smaragdina (Schmarda, 1861)
- Hipponoe Audouin & Milne Edwards, 1830
  - Hipponoe gaudichaudi Audouin & Milne Edwards, 1830
- Linopherus Quatrefages, 1866
  - Linopherus abyssalis (Fauchald, 1972)
  - Linopherus acarunculatus (Monro, 1937)
  - Linopherus ambigua (Monro, 1933)
  - Linopherus annulata (Hartmann-Schröder, 1965)
  - Linopherus beibuwanensis Sun & Li, 2016
  - Linopherus brevis (Grube, 1878)
  - Linopherus canariensis Langerhans, 1881
  - Linopherus fauchaldi San Martín, 1986
  - Linopherus hemuli (Fauchald, 1972)
  - Linopherus hirsuta (Wesenberg-Lund, 1949)
  - Linopherus incarunculata (Peters, 1854)
  - Linopherus kristiani Salazar-Vallejo, 1987
  - Linopherus microcephala (Fauvel, 1932)
  - Linopherus minuta (Knox, 1960)
  - Linopherus oculata (Treadwell, 1941)
  - Linopherus oculifera (Augener, 1913)
  - Linopherus oligobranchia (Wu, Shen & Chen, 1975)
  - Linopherus paucibranchiata (Fauvel, 1932)
  - Linopherus reducta (Kudenov & Blake, 1985)
  - Linopherus spiralis (Wesenberg-Lund, 1949)
  - Linopherus tripunctata (Kudenov, 1975)
- Paramphinome M. Sars in G. Sars 1872
  - Paramphinome australis Monro, 1930
  - Paramphinome besnardi Temperini in Amaral & Nonato, 1994
  - Paramphinome grandis Gustafson, 1930
  - Paramphinome indica Fauvel, 1932
  - Paramphinome jeffreysii (McIntosh, 1868)
  - Paramphinome pacifica Fauchald & Hancock, 1981
  - Paramphinome posterobranchiata Barroso & Paiva, 2008
  - Paramphinome splendens Gustafson, 1930
  - Paramphinome trionyx Intes & Le Loeuff, 1975
- Pareurythoe Gustafson, 1930
  - Pareurythoe americana Hartman, 1951
  - Pareurythoe borealis (M. Sars, 1862)
  - Pareurythoe californica (Johnson, 1897)
  - Pareurythoe chilensis (Kinberg, 1857)
  - Pareurythoe elongata (Treadwell, 1931)
  - Pareurythoe gracilis Gustafson, 1930
  - Pareurythoe japonica Gustafson, 1930
  - Pareurythoe parvecarunculata (Horst, 1912)
  - Pareurythoe pitipanaensis De Silva, 1965
  - Pareurythoe spirocirrata (Essenberg, 1917)
- Pherecardia Horst, 1886
  - Pherecardia maculata Imajima, 2003
  - Pherecardia parva Monro, 1924
  - Pherecardia polylamellata Silva, 1960
  - Pherecardia striata (Kinberg, 1857)

=== Archinominae Kudenov, 1991 ===
- Archinome Kudenov, 1991
  - Archinome jasoni Borda, Kudenov, Chevaldonné, Blake, Desbruyères, Fabri, Hourdez, Pleijel, Shank, Wilson, Schulze & Rouse, 2013
  - Archinome levinae Borda, Kudenov, Chevaldonné, Blake, Desbruyères, Fabri, Hourdez, Pleijel, Shank, Wilson, Schulze & Rouse, 2013
  - Archinome rosacea (Blake, 1985)
  - Archinome storchi Fiege & Bock, 2009
  - Archinome tethyana Borda, Kudenov, Chevaldonné, Blake, Desbruyères, Fabri, Hourdez, Pleijel, Shank, Wilson, Schulze & Rouse, 2013
- Bathychloeia Horst, 1910
  - Bathychloeia balloniformis Böggemann, 2009
  - Bathychloeia sibogae Horst, 1910
- Chloeia Lamarck, 1818
  - Chloeia amphora Horst, 1910
  - Chloeia australis Kudenov, 1993
  - Chloeia bengalensis Kinberg, 1867
  - Chloeia bistriata Grube, 1868
  - Chloeia candida Kinberg, 1857
  - Chloeia conspicua Horst, 1910
  - Chloeia egena Grube, 1855
  - Chloeia entypa Chamberlin, 1919
  - Chloeia flava (Pallas, 1766)
  - Chloeia furcigera Quatrefages, 1866
  - Chloeia fusca McIntosh, 1885
  - Chloeia inermis Quatrefages, 1866
  - Chloeia kudenovi Barroso & Paiva, 2011
  - Chloeia macleayi Haswell, 1878
  - Chloeia maculata Potts, 1909
  - Chloeia malaica Kinberg, 1867
  - Chloeia nuda Quatrefages, 1866
  - Chloeia parva Baird, 1868
  - Chloeia pinnata Moore, 1911
  - Chloeia pseudeuglochis Augener, 1922
  - Chloeia quatrefagesii Baird, 1868
  - Chloeia rosea Potts, 1909
  - Chloeia rupestris Risso, 1826
  - Chloeia tumida Baird, 1868
  - Chloeia venusta Quatrefages, 1866
  - Chloeia violacea Horst, 1910
  - Chloeia viridis Schmarda, 1861
- Chloenopsis Fauchald, 1977
  - Chloenopsis atlantica (McIntosh, 1885)
- Notopygos Grube, 1855
  - Notopygos albiseta Holly, 1939
  - Notopygos andrewsi Monro, 1924
  - Notopygos caribea Yáñez-Rivera & Carrera-Parra, 2012
  - Notopygos cirratus Horst, 1911
  - Notopygos crinita Grube, 1855
  - Notopygos flavus Haswell, 1878
  - Notopygos gardineri Potts, 1909
  - Notopygos gigas Horst, 1911
  - Notopygos gregoryi Holly, 1939
  - Notopygos hispida Potts, 1909
  - Notopygos horsti Monro, 1924
  - Notopygos kekooa Borda, Yanez-Rivera, Ochoa, Kudenov, Sanchez-Ortiz, Schulze & Rouse, 2017
  - Notopygos labiatus McIntosh, 1885
  - Notopygos megalops McIntosh, 1885
  - Notopygos mitsukurii Izuka, 1910
  - Notopygos ornata Grube, 1856
  - Notopygos parvus Haswell, 1878
  - Notopygos rayneri (Baird, 1868)
  - Notopygos splendens (Kinberg, 1857)
  - Notopygos subpragigas Uschakov & Wu, 1962
  - Notopygos variabilis Potts, 1909
- Parachloeia Horst, 1912
  - Parachloeia marmorata Horst, 1912

=== Subfamily not assigned ===
- †Rollinschaeta Parry, Wilson, Sykes, Edgecombe & Vinther, 2015
  - †Rollinschaeta myoplena Parry, Wilson, Sykes, Edgecombe & Vinther, 2015
