= Complanine =

Names
- Preferred IUPAC name 4-{[(2R,5Z,8Z)-2-Hydroxyundeca-5,8-dien-1-yl]amino}-N,N,N-trimethyl-4-oxobutan-1-aminium
- Other names: (−)-Complanine; (R)-(−)-Complanine

Identifiers
CAS Number	1042688-43-6
3D model (JSmol)	Interactive image
ChemSpider	25047857
PubChem CID	24887668
UNII	BXC744Y6CF
CompTox Dashboard (EPA)	DTXSID701028454 DTXSID90745433, DTXSID701028454
- InChI: InChI=1S/C18H34N2O2/c1-5-6-7-8-9-10-11-13-17(21)16-19-18(22)14-12-15-20(2,3)4/h6-7,9-10,17,21H,5,8,11-16H2,1-4H3/p+1/b7-6-,10-9-/t17-/m1/s1 Key: QYFDYRHORFAECH-SVCKQPKZSA-O; InChI=1/C18H34N2O2/c1-5-6-7-8-9-10-11-13-17(21)16-19-18(22)14-12-15-20(2,3)4/h6-7,9-10,17,21H,5,8,11-16H2,1-4H3/p+1/b7-6-,10-9-/t17-/m1/s1 Key: QYFDYRHORFAECH-SKOIHYTMBD
- SMILES: CC/C=C\C/C=C\CC[C@H](CNC(=O)CCC[N+](C)(C)C)O

Properties
Chemical formula	C_{11}H_{22}NO^{+}
Molar mass	184.302 g·mol^{−1}
- Except where otherwise noted, data are given for materials in their standard state (at 25 °C [77 °F], 100 kPa). verify (what is ?) Infobox references

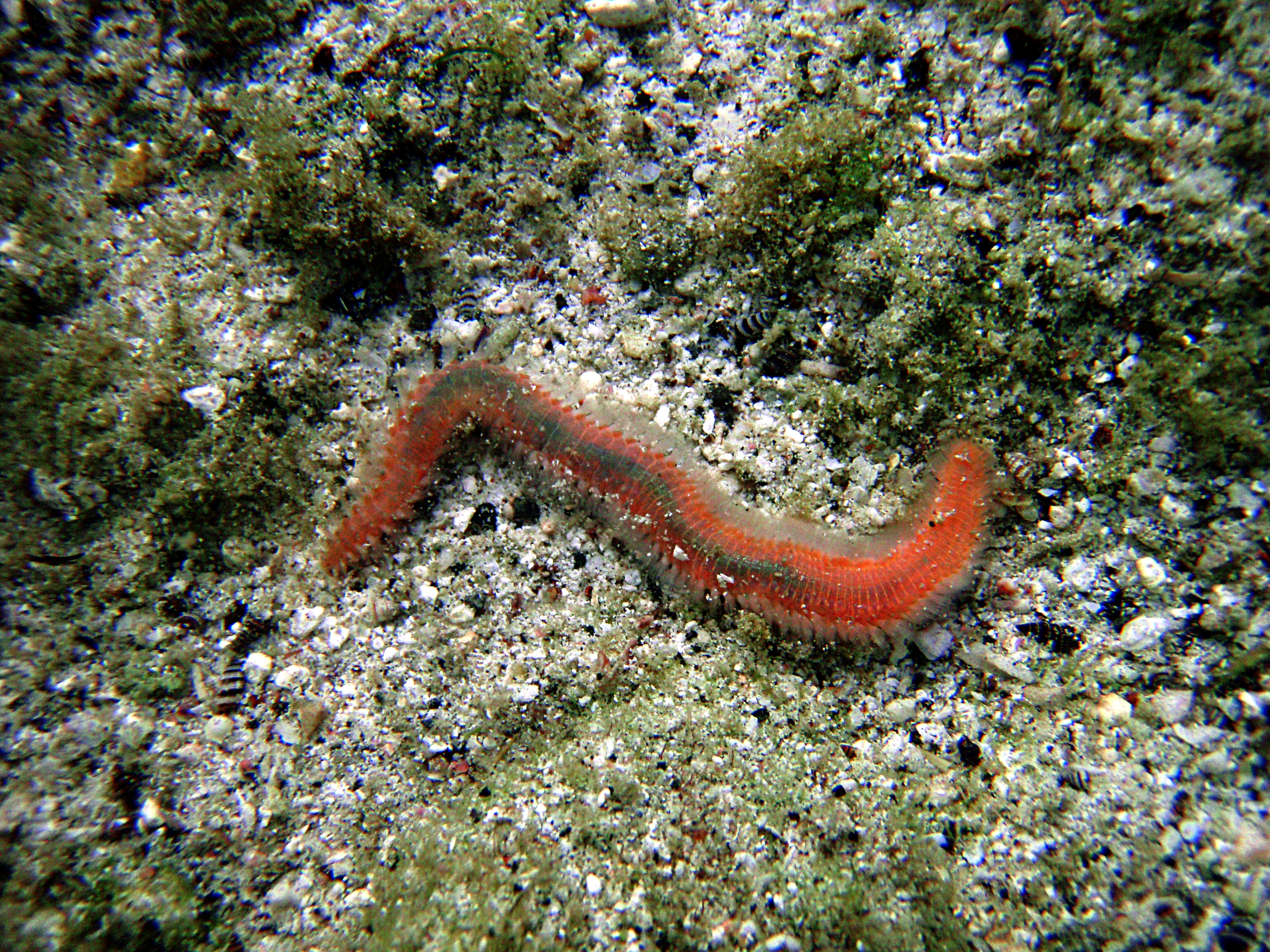
Eurythoe complanata

Complanine is a quaternary ammonium compound isolated from the marine fireworm Eurythoe complanata. It causes an inflammatory effect upon contact with the skin or mucous membranes.

== Occurrence ==
It was previously known that handling the fireworm caused it to release a chemical that induces inflammation of the skin of marine predators and mammals (including humans). Complanine was the first compound isolated from the fireworm which causes these effects. The chemical structure of Complanine was determined by spectroscopical methods and the absolute configuration was confirmed with a total synthesis.

It is presumed that this compound's function is to deter predators of the fireworm.
