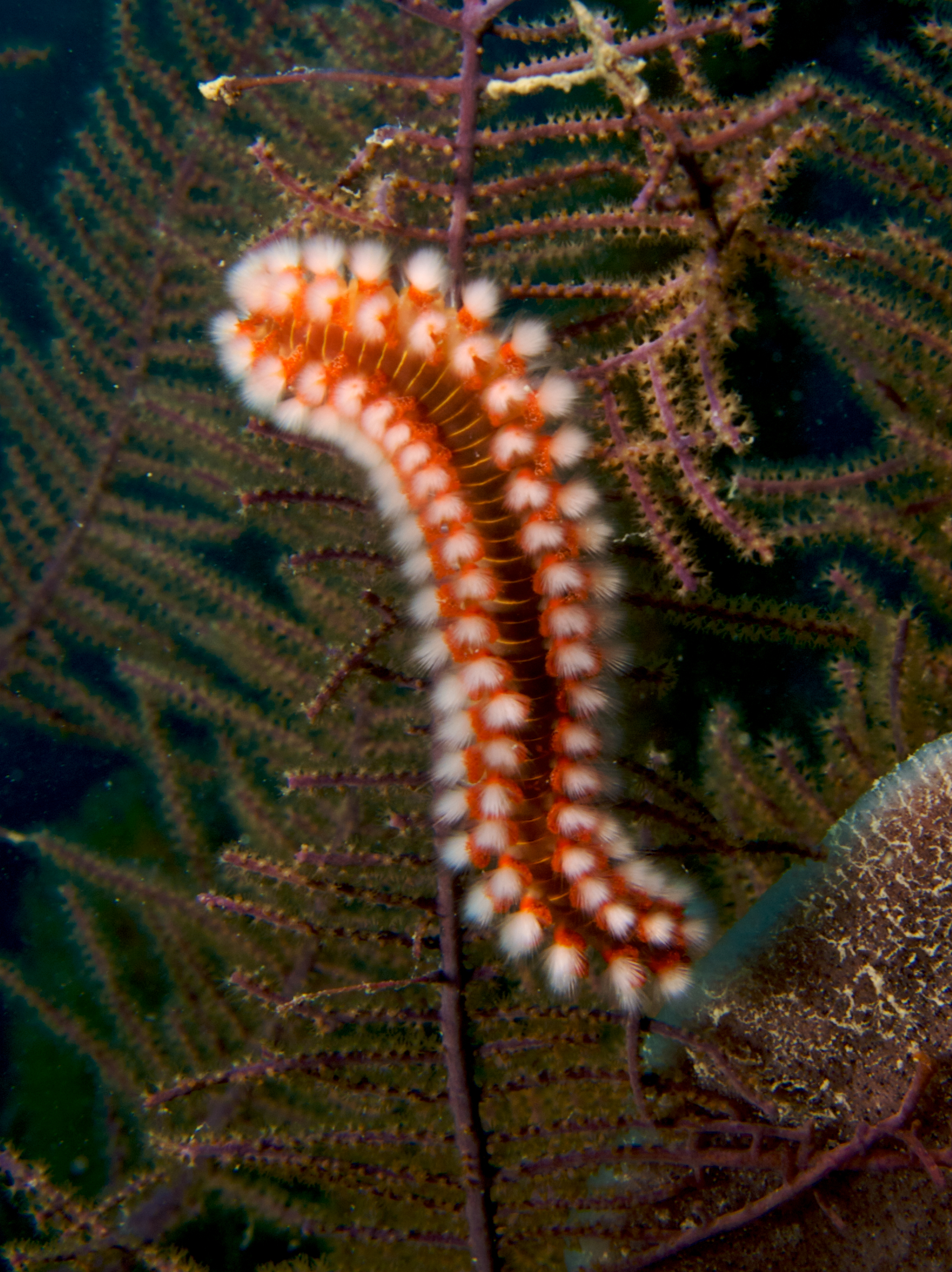

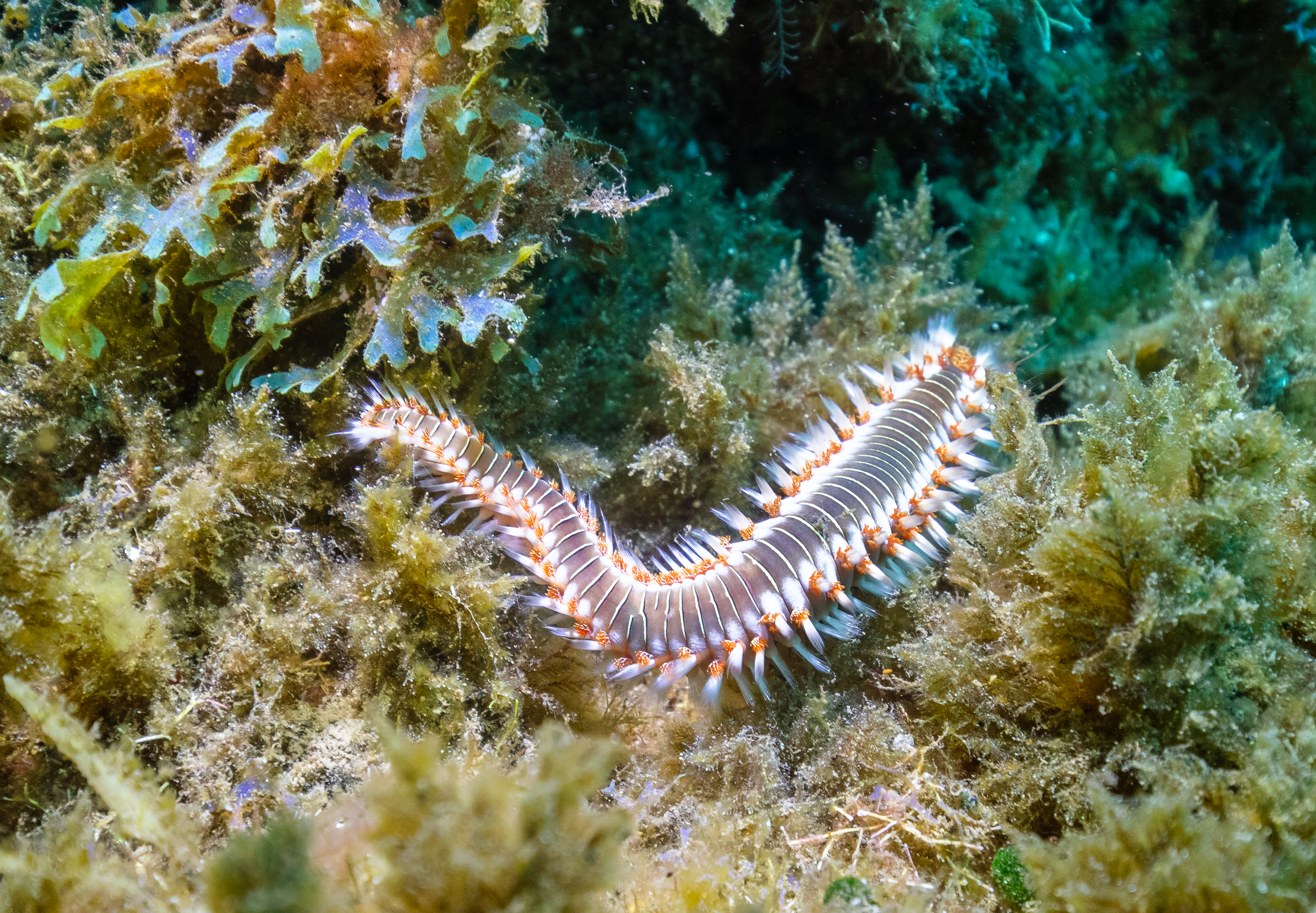

Scientific classification
- Kingdom: Animalia
- Phylum: Annelida
- Order: Amphinomida
- Family: Amphinomidae
- Genus: Hermodice
- Species: H. carunculata

Binomial name
- Hermodice carunculata (Pallas, 1766)

= Hermodice carunculata =

Species of annelid worm

Hermodice carunculata, the bearded fireworm, is a type of marine bristleworm belonging to the Amphinomidae family, native to the tropical Atlantic Ocean and the Mediterranean Sea.

== Description ==
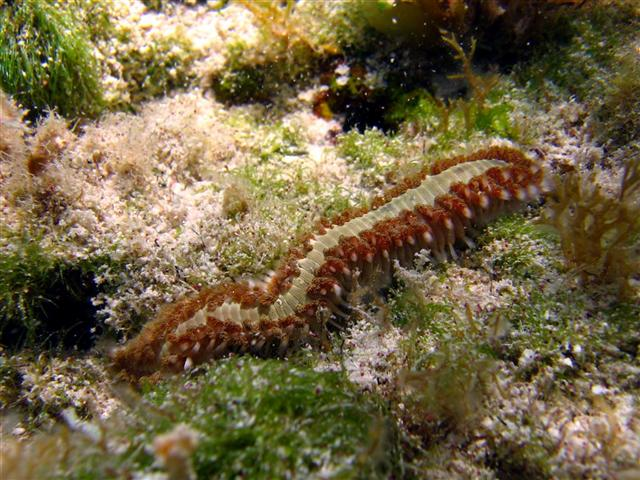
Bearded fireworm

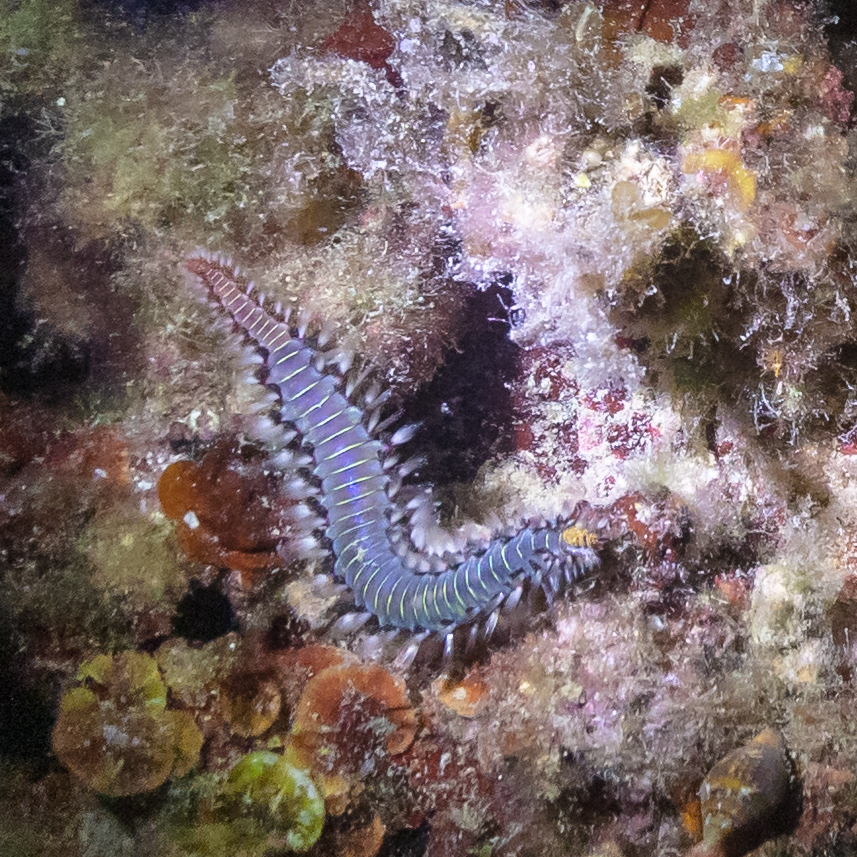
Bearded fireworm from the Mediterranean

Bearded fireworms are usually 15 cm (6 inches) in average length, but can reach up to 30 cm (12 inches).

At first glance, this fireworm looks like a centipede with its elongated and flattened appearance, multiple segments, white silks, and parapodia and gills located on the side of its body. Its colors are varied and range from greenish, to yellowish, to reddish, grayish through white with a pearly glow. The body consists of 60 to 150 identical segments separated from each other by a thin white line and protected by cuticles. Each segment has a pair of parapodia, a structure for locomotion, clusters of stinging white bristles, and red or orange gills all in bilateral position. The anterior part of the worm can be recognized by small growths, called caruncle, which have the same color of the gills on the first four segments. The mouth is ventral and is located on the second segment. The head is shown on the first segment and includes the eyes and other sensory organs.

== Distribution and habitat ==
The bearded fireworm lives throughout the tropical coastal waters of the Atlantic Ocean. On the eastern side they are found from Algeria to Liberia, and on the western side from the southeast coast of the United States to Guyana, including the Gulf of Mexico and the Caribbean Sea. They are also found in the Mediterranean Sea, especially around the Italian coasts. A significant population structure exists between the Caribbean / Brazil population of H. carunculata, and those from the eastern Atlantic (Canary Islands) and eastern Mediterranean.

This fireworm is found in many marine living environments such as corals, rocks, mud, sand, posidonia, and on drifting wood as well as port infrastructure in shallow water from the surface to 40 m (130 feet) deep.

== Biology ==
The bearded fireworm is a voracious predator that supplements its diet with plant material.

The bearded fireworm is a slow creature, and is not considered a threat to humans unless touched by unassuming swimmers. The bristles, when flared, can penetrate human skin, injecting a powerful neurotoxin and producing intense irritation and a painful burning sensation around the area of contact. The sting can also lead to nausea and dizziness. This sensation lasts up to a few hours, but a painful tingling may still be felt around the area of contact. In case of accidental contact, application and removal of adhesive tape will help remove the spines; applying isopropanol to the area may help alleviate the pain.

The transcriptome of the bearded fireworm was sequenced and annotated in 2015.

== Bibliography ==
- Greenberg, Idaz (1986). Guide to Corals & Fishes of Florida, the Bahamas and the Caribbean. Seahawk Press. p. 61. ISBN 0-913008-08-7.
