= Amphinome (annelid) =

Scientific classification
- Domain: Eukaryota
- Kingdom: Animalia
- Phylum: Annelida
- Clade: Pleistoannelida
- Subclass: Errantia
- Family: Amphinomidae
- Genus: Amphinome; Bruguière, 1789

Genus of annelid worms

Amphinome is a genus of polychaetes belonging to the family Amphinomidae.

The genus has almost cosmopolitan distribution.

== Species ==
The following species are recognised:

- Amphinome bruguieresi Quatrefages, 1866
- Amphinome carnea Grube, 1856
- Amphinome nigrobranchiata Horst, 1912
- Amphinome rostrata (Pallas, 1766)
- Amphinome savignyi Brulle, 1832
- Amphinome stylifera Grube, 1860
- Amphinome umbo Grube, 1870
- Amphinome vagans (Savigny, 1822)
