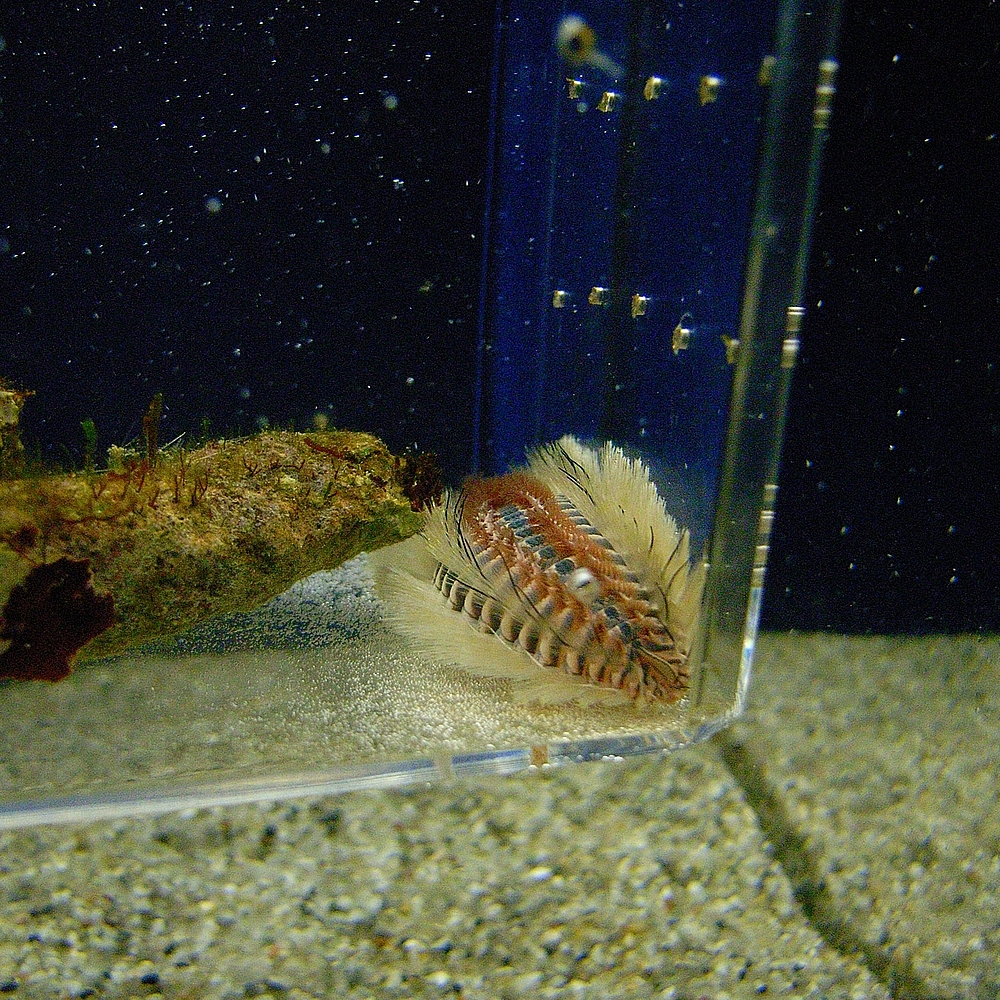
- Chloeia flava

Scientific classification
- Kingdom: Animalia
- Phylum: Annelida
- Order: Amphinomida
- Family: Amphinomidae
- Genus: Chloeia (Lamarck, 1818)

= Chloeia =

Genus of annelids

Chloeia is a genus of marine polychaete worms.

Members of this genus are morphologically characterized by an elliptical body composed of certain number of segments, depending on the species, with external gills situated on both lateral sides of the back, each segment has a pair of them. Their number and repartition also depends on the species. Lateral sides of the body are cover with fin, sharp and venomous whitish calcareous bristles or setae. Adults of this genus are often colorful especially on the dorsum.

The locomotion is done by parapodia, every segment possesses a pair in bilateral position, from which are activated "paddles", one dorsally called notopodia and another one ventrally called neuropodia.

Chloeia's distribution is circumtropical. Most of the known species are found in the Indian and Pacific Ocean so only few species lives in the Atlantic Ocean.

== List of species ==
There are 28 species in the genus Chloeia:

- Chloeia amphora Horst, 1910
- Chloeia australis Kudenov, 1993
- Chloeia bengalensis Kinberg, 1867
- Chloeia bistriata Grube, 1868
- Chloeia candida Kinberg, 1857
- Chloeia conspicua Horst, 1910
- Chloeia egena Grube, 1855
- Chloeia entypa Chamberlin, 1919
- Chloeia flava (Pallas, 1766)
- Chloeia furcigera Quatrefages, 1866
- Chloeia fusca McIntosh, 1885
- Chloeia inermis Quatrefages, 1866
- Chloeia kudenovi Barroso & Paiva, 2011
- Chloeia macleayi Haswell, 1878
- Chloeia maculata Potts, 1909
- Chloeia malaica Kinberg, 1867
- Chloeia nuda Quatrefages, 1866
- Chloeia parva Baird, 1868
- Chloeia pinnata Moore, 1911
- Chloeia pseudeuglochis Augener, 1922
- Chloeia quatrefagesii Baird, 1868
- Chloeia rosea Potts, 1909
- Chloeia rupestris Risso, 1826
- Chloeia tumida Baird, 1868
- Chloeia venusta Quatrefages, 1866
- Chloeia violacea Horst, 1910
- Chloeia viridis Schmarda, 1861
- Chloeia bimaculata
