= Charles Carmichael Arthur Monro =

British annelidologist (1894–1942)

- Born: 1894; India
- Died: June 21, 1942
- Education: Eton College; Trinity College, Oxford
- Known for: Classification of annelids
- Notable work: Polychaete Worms (1930)
- Spouses: Pamela Garside Tipping (m. 1917); Sheila Mary Anderson (m. 1927)
- Scientific career
- Fields: Zoology
- Workplaces: British Museum (Natural History)

Charles Carmichael Arthur Monro (1894–1942), was a British zoologist, particularly active in the classification of annelids.

== Life ==
Monro was born in India to a Scottish family and was educated as a King's Scholar at Eton College and at Trinity College, Oxford. His university career was interrupted by the First World War, during which he served in France and Belgium. Having originally begun studying Classics, he returned to Oxford after the war and switched to Natural Science. He became assistant keeper in the Zoological Department of the British Museum (Natural History). Between 1924 and 1939 he published 37 papers, mostly on annelids. For two years (1925–27) he was editor of the Museums Journal.

He was married twice, first to Pamela Garside Tipping (1917) and then to Sheila Mary Anderson (1927). In his thirties, he became a member of the Catholic Church. During the Second World War he was seconded to the Ministry of Food. He died of illness on 21 June 1942.

== Publications ==
- Polychaete Worms (Cambridge University Press, 1930)
