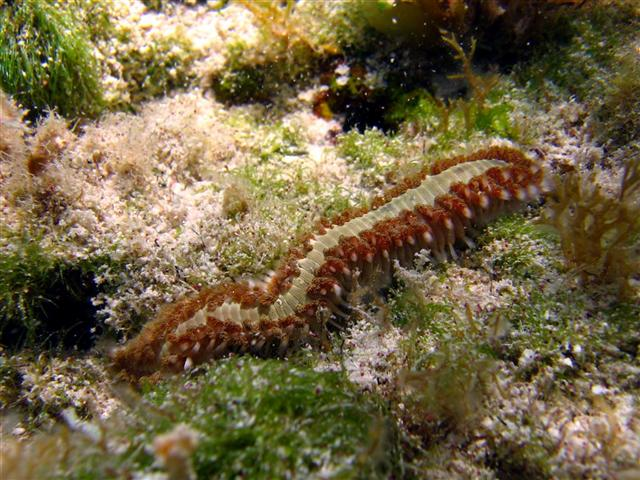
- Hermodice carunculata

Scientific classification
- Kingdom: Animalia
- Phylum: Annelida
- Order: Amphinomida

Families
- Amphinomidae; Euphrosinidae

= Amphinomida =

Order of annelid worms

Amphinomida is an order of marine polychaetes. The order contains two families:

- Amphinomidae Lamarck, 1818
- Euphrosinidae Williams, 1852

The fossil record of this taxon (not abundant in annelids overall because this taxon lacks a mineralized skeleton) formerly included Palaeocampa anthrax Meek & Worthen, 1865 from the Late Carboniferous site of Montceau-les-Mines. However, this genus was redescribed as an aysheaiid lobopodian in 2025.
