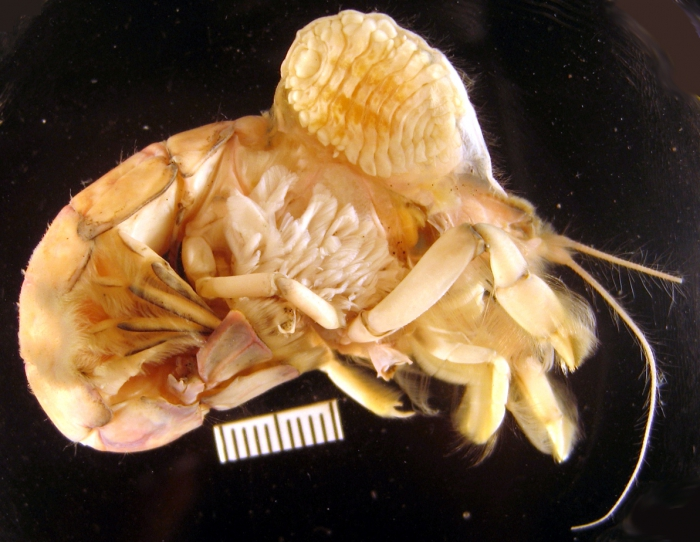
- Upogebia pugettensis with a female Orthione greffenis on its gill flap

Scientific classification
- Kingdom: Animalia
- Phylum: Arthropoda
- Clade: Pancrustacea
- Class: Malacostraca
- Order: Isopoda
- Family: Bopyridae
- Genus: Orthione
- Species: O. griffenis

Binomial name
- Orthione griffenis Markham, 2004

= Orthione griffenis =

Species of crustacean

Orthione griffenis, or Griffen's isopod, is an isopod parasite present in the waters off East Asia as well as the West Coast of North America and Central America that specializes in parasitizing mud shrimp.

== Description ==
Orthione griffenis is an Epicaridean isopoda parasite that is found on the gill chamber of Upogebia mud shrimp. Female O. griffenis are quite different from their male counterpart. Females have an oblong body, that is typically 6-24mm long with a width of half the length. Males are the smaller sex with a body that resembles more of a cylinder than an oval, 8mm long and 3mm wide. Females have 6 pleons and males have 7.

== Distribution ==
Orthione griffenis is native to the coasts of Asia. O. griffenis was first recorded on the coast of Willapa Bay, Washington, in 1988. Since then, O. griffenis has established itself from south eastern Alaska, British Columbia, Canada to Baja California, Mexico. They were likely introduced from cargo ships bound from Asia emptying their ballast tanks off the coast of North America. A study that supports this theory was published in 2025 that showed invasive O. griffenis have low genetic diversity. The low F_{ST} and high F_{IS} values found in this study are consistent with a large population increase after a severe bottleneck.

In 2017, this bopyrid was found in mud shrimp in British Columbia.

In 2024, Orthione griffenis was found in the Eastern coast of the United States near Rhode Island and Massachusetts.

== Ecology ==
In its native habitat of Eastern Asia, Orthione griffenis is known to parasitize U. major and U. issaeffi. After being introduced from Asia, Orthione griffenis have established themselves in North America by infesting the mud shrimp Upogebia pugettensis. O. griffenis typically infests female U. pugettensis rather than male (80% compared to 57%). They attach themselves to the gill chamber, where they suck the host's hemolymph. This causes a metabolic burdening effect that greatly hampers reproductive ability, which has led to a significant decline in U. pugettensis. It has been proposed that Orthione griffenis also induced sex change and male mortality in U. pugettensis. However O. griffenis have been associated with modification of secondary sex characteristics and showed no signs of increasing male mortality. In California, U. major, U. macginitieorum and U. pugettensis were found to be potential hosts for O. griffenis. In Mexico, U. onchyon and U. lepta were found to be potential hosts.

== Lifecycle ==
O. griffenis are hatched as larvae that attach themselves to copepods, and then metamorphose into a microniscus larva. After that, they molt several times until they become cryptonicus larva that then infest mud shrimp. The larval isopod will mature as a female if no other females are present on the mud shrimp. Female O. griffenis eyes atrophy completely and the body grows in size drastically when they mature. If a female is detected by a subsequent O. griffenis larva, then the individual will mature as a male. Males keep their eyes as adult individuals and do not grow as large as female individuals. The multiple O. griffenis males on a host mud shrimp will fertilize the brood pouch of the female Orthione griffenis which contains 20,000 to 60,000 eggs. In Oregon, some populations of O. griffenis have been observed with only one male and one female pair on a host mud shrimp.

== Ecological impact ==
The ecological impact of the invasive O. griffenis is primarily through the reproductive castration and resulting decline of U. pugettensis. U. pugettensis females that are infected with O. griffenis have an average egg count of 18,000 reduced to an average of 15. Infected U. pugettensis are not directly killed and therefore can compete for resources against members of its own species. Hatfield Marine Science Center has found that all documented populations of U. pugettensis are infested with O. griffenis, and mud shrimp populations in 4 of 18 estuaries have gone extinct as of 2008. U. pugettensis burrows are used by many native commensal estuarine organisms such as Neaeromya rugifera, Pareurythoe californica, Clevelandia ios, and Pinnotheres pisum. Shorebirds, Leptocottus armatus, and juvenile salmon are known to eat U. pugettensis. The decrease of burrows and prey items resulting from the decrease in U. pugettensis populations is theorized to stress out both commensal estuarine organisms and predators. U. pugettensis is known to aerate soil and increase the rate of nitrification and ammonification in soil near its burrow.

== Commercial impact ==
U. pugettensis is commonly used as fish bait in the Western United States. Its decline as a result of O. griffenis has led to a decrease in commercial fishing yields of U. pugettensis for the years ranging from 1988 and 2011. The decline of U. pugettensis as a result of O. griffenis has benefitted the oyster farming industry who commonly deploy pesticides such as carbaryl to kill U. pugettensis. Areas that previously could not support oyster farms due to an abundance of U. pugettensis, such as Samish Bay, are now suitable regions for oyster farms.

== See also ==
- Bopyridae
- Upogebia
- Epicaridean
- Isopod
