= Penis (disambiguation) =

The penis is the male sex organ.

Penis or PENIS may also refer to:

- Human penis
- Proton-enhanced nuclear induction spectroscopy
- Penis Park (Haesindang Park), on the east coast of South Korea
- "Penis Song (Not the Noël Coward Song)", a song by Monty Python from Monty Python's The Meaning of Life

== Biology ==
- Penis fish (disambiguation)
  - Urechis caupo, a species of spoon worm in North America
  - Urechis unicinctus, a species of spoon worm in East Asia
- Penis plant, several plants
- Penis snake (Atretochoana)
- Penis worm (Priapulida)

== See also ==
- Penes (disambiguation)
- Penith (The Dave Soundtrack), a soundtrack album by Lil Dicky
