= Fat innkeeper worm =

Fat innkeeper worm may refer to:

- Urechis caupo, a species of spoon worm in North America
- Urechis unicinctus, a species of spoon worm in East Asia
