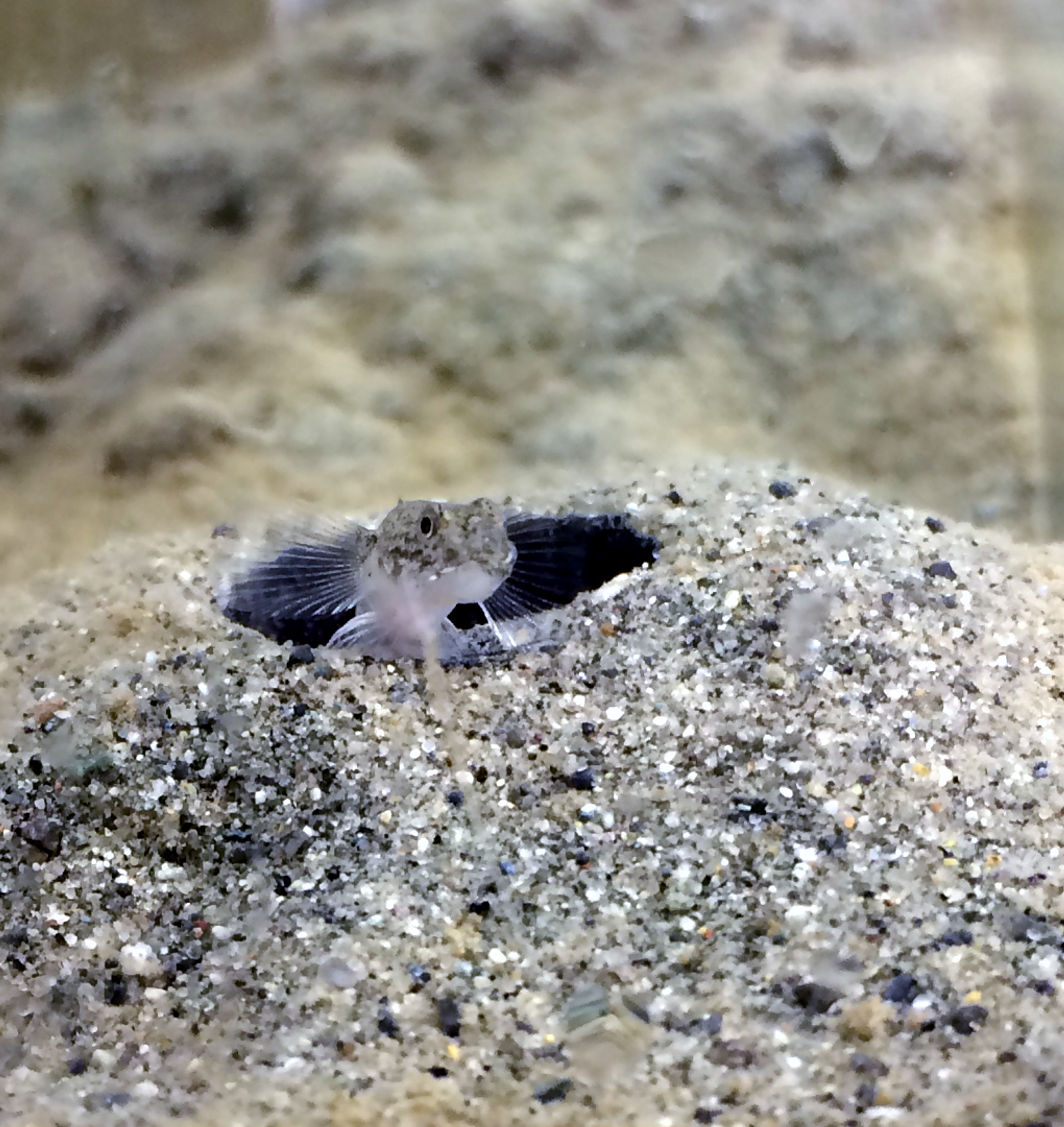

Scientific classification
- Domain: Eukaryota
- Kingdom: Animalia
- Phylum: Chordata
- Class: Actinopterygii
- Order: Gobiiformes
- Family: Oxudercidae
- Subfamily: Gobionellinae
- Genus: Clevelandia; C. H. Eigenmann & R. S. Eigenmann, 1888
- Species: C. ios

Binomial name
- Clevelandia ios (D. S. Jordan & C. H. Gilbert, 1882)

Synonyms
- Gobiosoma ios D. S. Jordan & C. H. Gilbert, 1882

= Arrow goby =

Species of fish

The arrow goby (Clevelandia ios) is a species of goby native to marine and brackish waters of the Pacific coast of North America from British Columbia to Baja California. This species grows to a length of 6.4 centimetres (2.5 in) SL, though most do not exceed 4.2 centimetres (1.7 in) TL. This fish can also be found displayed in public aquaria. This species is the only known member of its genus.

== Description ==
The arrow goby is a small, pale grey, translucent fish which grows to 6.4 centimetres (2.5 in) in length. It has two dorsal fins; the first is the shorter and has 4-5 spines while the dorsal fin has 15-17 soft fin rays. The anal fin is about equal in length to the second dorsal fin and has 14-17 fin rays. Like other gobies, the caudal fin is rounded and the pectoral fins form a cone which the goby uses to prop the anterior part of its body above the substrate. Its scales are minute, and the mouth extends beyond to the eye. The dorsal fins have short horizontal stripes and the body is pale brownish-grey in colour with darker mottling.

== Distribution ==
Arrow gobies are found along the Pacific Coast of North America, from the Rivers Inlet in British Columbia to Baja California.

== Habitat and biology ==
The arrow goby occurs in sand or mud substrates, where it uses burrows created by invertebrates as shelters when it is threatened and as a refuge at low tide. Some of the species which make burrows used by arrow gobies include the shrimps Neotrypaea californiensis and Upogebia pugettensis and the fat innkeeper worm Urechis caupo. It is a common species of estuaries, lagoons and tidal sloughs, and it has been reported in freshwater. The adults feed on diatoms, green algae, tintinnids, and the eggs and young of the host shrimp or prawn. This species will place large food items close to crabs so that the crab will tear it into smaller pieces. Arrow gobies are prey for Sebastes, staghorn sculpin, whitespot greenling and terns. This species does not build a nest or provide any care for its offspring, and the eggs are dispersed into the water column. The underside of this goby is silvery, and when threatened, they use this to make a brief signal to other gobies before quickly taking refuge in the burrow. This is also used to signal for mates. The individuals of this species are protogynous hermaphrodites; young adults are females and as they mature they become male.

== Etymology ==
The generic name Clevelandia honours the lawyer Daniel Cleveland (1838–1929), who was a founder and president of the San Diego Natural History Society and who made significant contributions to the knowledge of the flora and fauna of southern California. Over a dozen plants – including the Cleveland sage and another genus Clevelandia – were also named after him.

The specific name ios is an Ancient Greek word for an arrow: ἰός. It refers to the slender fish's long body that is reminiscent of an arrow.
