= Upogebia pugettensis =

Scientific classification
- Domain: Eukaryota
- Kingdom: Animalia
- Phylum: Arthropoda
- Class: Malacostraca
- Order: Decapoda
- Suborder: Pleocyemata
- Family: Upogebiidae
- Genus: Upogebia
- Species: U. pugettensis

Binomial name
- Upogebia pugettensis (Dana, 1852)

Species of crustacean

Upogebia pugettensis, also known as the blue mud shrimp, is a species of mud lobster from the West Coast of North America.

== Description ==
Upogebia pugettensis has an elongated and broad abdomen, including a well-developed tail fin (uropods). The shrimp measure up to 11 cm long in adulthood. Its snout (rostrum) is hairy and includes 3 teeth. They eat detritus which they bring into their burrow using their pleopods. Upogebia pugettensis is the host of many parasites: Pseudopythina rugifera, Phyllodurus abdominalis, and Orthione griffenis.

== Distribution ==
Upogebia pugettensis is found from Valdez Narrows, Alaska, to Morro Bay, California. South of Morro Bay, U. macginitieorum, a very similar species to U. pugettensis, is found.

== Ecology ==
Upogebia pugettensis lives in Y- or U-shaped burrows (0.6 to 1 m (2.0 to 3.3 ft) deep) that are located in inter-tidal mud flats, and they usually live in pairs. They can tolerate brackish water down to 10% seawater salinity. With their burrows, they've been known to disrupt commercial oyster beds. Their burrows are important dwellings for many species, including the arrow goby, hooded shrimp, Scleroplax granulata, pea crabs, and clams.

One common predator to these benthic shrimp are the pacific staghorn sculpin. Parasites are also common, particularly the red copepod, which lives on the outside of the body. Another common parasite in Oregon's Yaquina Bay is Orthione griffenis. This blood-sucking parasite can castrate females and has been shown to lower the weights of infested hosts by an average of 7.8%.

== Population decline ==
Upogebia pugettensis is currently facing a serious threat from the non-native isopod parasite Orthione griffenis (Markham, 2004). Female Upogebia pugettensis are infested with the parasite more than their male counterparts (80% compared to 57%). Female Orthione griffenis attach themselves to the gill of the shrimp. They then consume the blood of the host, which causes a metabolic burdening effect that greatly hampers reproductive ability. This has caused the decline.

In 2017 the infestation was found to have extended into British Columbia.
