= Clausidium vancouverense =

Scientific classification
- Domain: Eukaryota
- Kingdom: Animalia
- Phylum: Arthropoda
- Class: Copepoda
- Order: Cyclopoida
- Family: Clausidiidae
- Genus: Clausidium
- Species: C. vancouverense

Binomial name
- Clausidium vancouverense Haddon, 1912

Species of crustacean

Clausidium vancouverense, the red copepod, is a symbiont of the ghost shrimp Neotrypaea californiensis. It is one of six species in the genus Clausidium and is found with its host in the Pacific Ocean from Alaska to Baja California.

== Description ==
Females range in length from 1.086–1.222 millimetres (0.043–0.048 in). The female is larger than the male, and a female sometimes carries a male attached to her dorsal thorax.

Several features separate this copepod from other species in its genus. These include the blade-like seta on the first leg and the small lateral hairs on the setae of the fifth leg on females. In males, the structure of the maxilliped is unique.

== Ecology ==
Copepod distribution of a similar species Clausidium dissimile on ghost shrimp were positively correlated to the host's body size, but host sex did not affect distribution. C. vancouverense sticks to the branchial cavity of its host via suckers.
