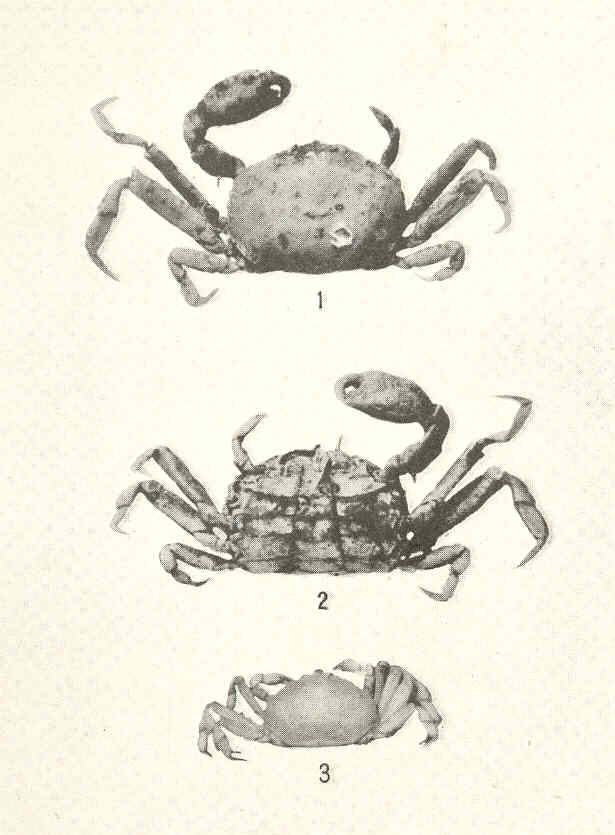

Scientific classification
- Kingdom: Animalia
- Phylum: Arthropoda
- Clade: Pancrustacea
- Class: Malacostraca
- Order: Decapoda
- Suborder: Pleocyemata
- Infraorder: Brachyura
- Family: Pinnotheridae
- Genus: Scleroplax; Rathbun, 1894

= Scleroplax =

Genus of crabs

Scleroplax is a genus of crabs in the family Pinnotheridae.

Species of the genus Scleroplax live as a commensal of various burrowing animals including the mud shrimp Neotrypaea californiensis, N. gigas, Upogebia pugettensis and U. macginiteorum, and the echiuran worm Urechis caupo (known as the "fat innkeeper"), and occurs from Vancouver Island, British Columbia to Punta Abreojos, Mulegé, Baja California Sur, Mexico.
