= Penis fish =

Penis fish may refer to:

- Urechis caupo, a species of spoon worm in North America
- Urechis unicinctus, a species of spoon worm in East Asia
- Candiru, a parasitic fish alleged to have entered a human urethra
- Phallichthys, a genus of fish whose name literally translates to "penis fish" from Greek.
- Ballyhoo, a fish from the Caribbean and South America. The name derives from a Native American word for "penis fish".
