= Penes (disambiguation) =

Penes is a plural form of penis.

Penes may also refer to:

- Mihaela Peneș (1947-2024), Romanian athlete
- Penes (Ancient Greece), the "active poor"

== See also ==
- Harry H. Pennes (1918–1963), American physician
- Pens (disambiguation)
- Penis (disambiguation)
