= Tadger =

Tadger may refer to:

- James Stewart (footballer, born 1883) (1883-1952), English association footballer with the nickname "Tadger"
- St. Tadger's Day, a fictitious holiday in the BBC2 television comedy series Ripping Yarns
- Tadger, a British slang term for the human penis

== See also ==
- Todger, see Human penis#Terminology
- Penis (disambiguation)
