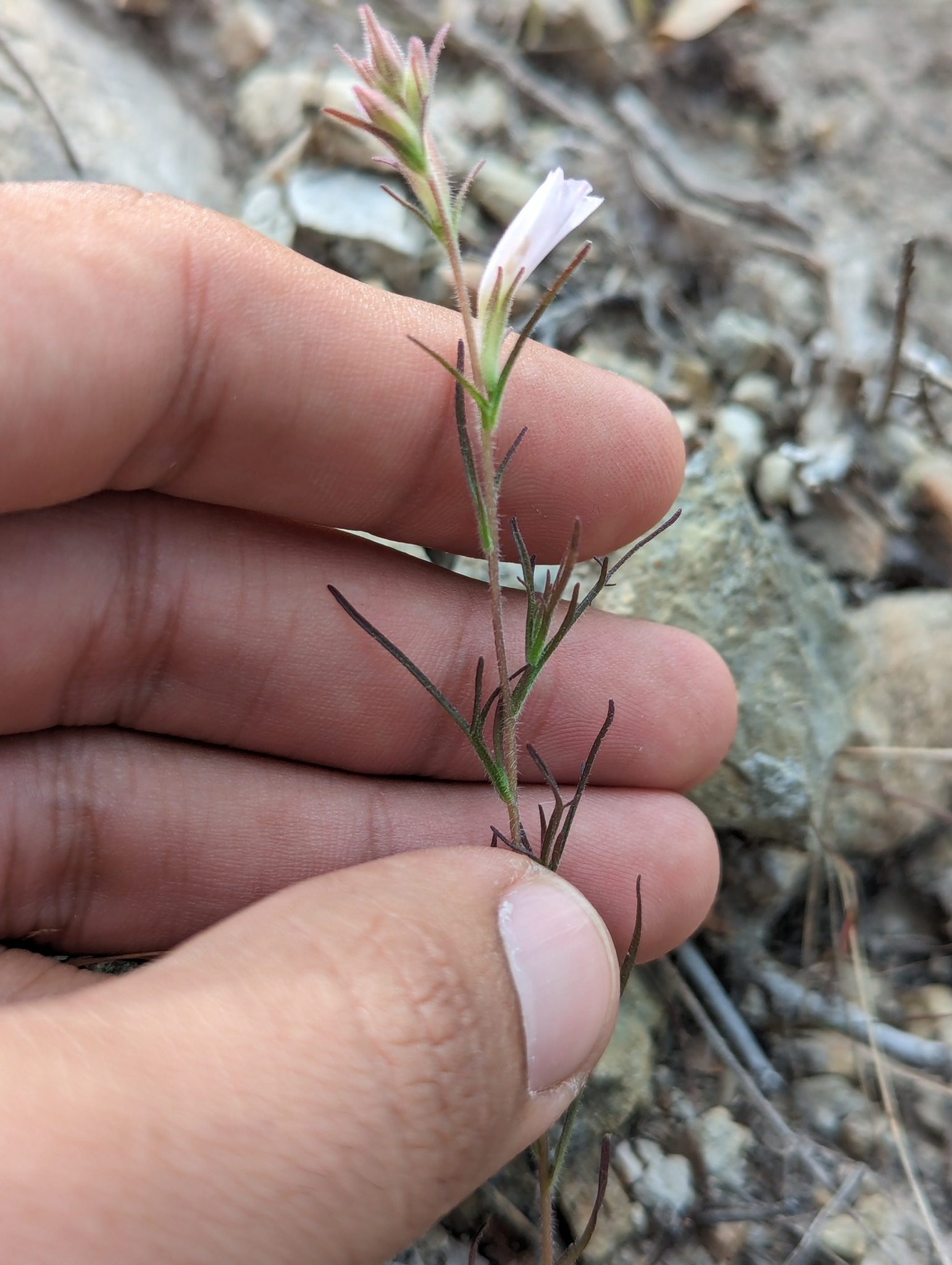

Scientific classification
- Kingdom: Plantae
- Clade: Embryophytes
- Clade: Tracheophytes
- Clade: Spermatophytes
- Clade: Angiosperms
- Clade: Eudicots
- Clade: Asterids
- Order: Lamiales
- Family: Orobanchaceae
- Genus: Castilleja
- Species: C. beldingii

Binomial name
- Castilleja beldingii (Greene) Tank & J.M.Egger

Synonyms
- Orthocarpus beldingii Greene; Clevelandia beldingii (Greene) Greene ex. O.Hoffm.

= Castilleja beldingii =

Species of flowering plant in the broomrape family

Castilleja beldingii is a species of hemiparasitic plant in the broomrape family, formerly the only species in the genus Clevelandia, it was moved to the genus Castilleja, the 'indian paintbrushes', in 2009.

== Taxonomy ==
Edward Lee Greene first described it as Orthocarpus beldingi in 1885, but he later reclassified it in the monotypic genus Clevelandia in the Bulletin of the California Academy of Sciences in 1886. The spelling was later correct to beldingii. However, Greene reclassified it invalidly, the German taxonomist Karl August Otto Hoffmann rectified this and published Greene's name correctly in Adolf Engler's classic Die natürlichen Pflanzenfamilien in 1893. After molecular phylogenetic work, Tank et al moved it to the large genus Castilleja in 2009.

The lectotype was collected in the Sierra La Victoria by the American ornithologist Lyman Belding during his expedition to Baja California in 1883. It was only designated as such in 2009 by Tank et al.

=== Etymology ===
Its former generic name Clevelandia honours the San Diego–based plant collector and lawyer Daniel Cleveland (1838–1929), for whom numerous other plants were named, as well as a second Clevelandia genus (the arrow goby, a fish):

The genus is dedicated to Mr. Daniel Cleveland, of San Diego, whose intelligent field labors in Californian Botany have well earned this acknowledgment.

— Edward Lee Greene

== Distribution ==
It is native to Baja California and Baja California Sur, in northwestern Mexico.
