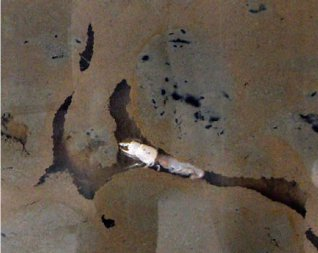
- Neotrypaea californiensis in its burrow

Scientific classification
- Kingdom: Animalia
- Phylum: Arthropoda
- Clade: Pancrustacea
- Class: Malacostraca
- Order: Decapoda
- Suborder: Pleocyemata
- Family: Callianassidae
- Genus: Neotrypaea; Manning & Felder, 1991

Type species
- Callianassa californiensis

= Neotrypaea =

Genus of crustaceans

Neotrypaea is a genus of ghost shrimp in the family Callianassidae, containing the following sixteen species:

- Neotrypaea biffari (Holthuis, 1991)
  - of which, Neotrypaea affinis (Holmes, 1900) is a synonym
- Neotrypaea caesari (Heard & R.B. Manning, 2000)
- Neotrypaea californiensis (Dana, 1854)
- Neotrypaea costaricensis (K. Sakai, 2005)
- Neotrypaea gigas (Dana, 1852)
- Neotrypaea hainanensis (WL Liu & RY Liu, 2014)
- Neotrypaea harmandi (Bouvier, 1901)
- Neotrypaea japonica (Ortmann, 1891)
- Neotrypaea makarovi (Marin, 2013)
- Neotrypaea melissae (Poore, 2008)
- Neotrypaea pacifica (Guzmán & Thatje, 2003)
- Neotrypaea petalura (Stimpson, 1860)
- Neotrypaea rochei (Bouvier, 1895)
- Neotrypaea tabogensis (K. Sakai, 2005)
- Neotrypaea thermophila (FJ Lin, Komai & TY Chan, 2007)
- Neotrypaea uncinata (H. Milne Edwards, 1837)
