= Scleroplax granulata =

Scientific classification
- Kingdom: Animalia
- Phylum: Arthropoda
- Class: Malacostraca
- Order: Decapoda
- Suborder: Pleocyemata
- Infraorder: Brachyura
- Family: Pinnotheridae
- Genus: Scleroplax
- Species: S. granulata

Binomial name
- Scleroplax granulata Rathbun, 1894

Species of crabs

Scleroplax granulata is a species of crab in the family Pinnotheridae.
