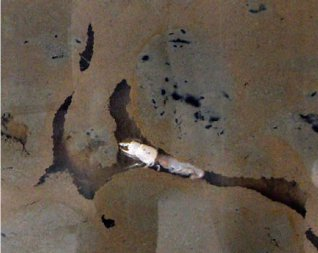
- An individual in its burrow

Scientific classification
- Kingdom: Animalia
- Phylum: Arthropoda
- Clade: Pancrustacea
- Class: Malacostraca
- Order: Decapoda
- Suborder: Pleocyemata
- Family: Callianassidae
- Genus: Neotrypaea
- Species: N. californiensis

Binomial name
- Neotrypaea californiensis (Dana, 1854)

Synonyms
- Callianassa californiensis Dana, 1854; Callianassa occidentalis Stimpson, 1856

= Neotrypaea californiensis =

Species of crustacean

Neotrypaea californiensis (formerly Callianassa californiensis), the Bay ghost shrimp, is a species of ghost shrimp that lives on the Pacific coast of North America. It is a pale arthropod which grows to a length of 11.5 cm (4.5 in). One claw is bigger than the other, especially in males, and the enlarged claw is thought to have a function in mating. N. californiensis is a deposit feeder that lives in extensive burrow systems, and is responsible for high rates of bioturbation. It adversely affects oyster farms, and its numbers are controlled in some places by the application of pesticides. It carries out an important role in the ecosystem, being a major source of food for both avian and marine predators. It is also used by fishermen as bait.

== Description and life cycle ==
Neotrypaea californiensis reaches a length of 11.5 centimetres (4.5 in). The body is creamy white, with patches of pale colour (pink, yellow or orange) on the appendages, and a pink abdomen.

Adult N. californiensis have one claw larger than the other, and in the males, the "master claw" can make up as much as 25% of the animal's mass – compared to only 10% in females – with the minor claw making up around 3% of the total body mass in both sexes. The enlarged claw is equally likely to be on the right side or the left side. The male's larger claw is thought to be used in agonistic encounters or during mating, and may be the result of sexual selection.

Eggs are laid in spring or early summer, and the larvae hatch in summer, living as plankton. They settle to the sea floor again as post-larvae in the late summer and fall.

== Taxonomy ==
N. californiensis was originally described in 1854 by James Dwight Dana as a member of the genus Callianassa, giving the type locality as "California"; the material Dana studied was probably collected from San Francisco Bay or Monterey, but the original specimens have since been lost. In 1991, Raymond Manning and Darryl Felder transferred the three species in that genus that come from California and Oregon into the new genus Neotrypaea. N. californiensis is distinguished from the other two species of Neotrypaea by its short, rounded rostrum (which is sharp and prominent in Neotrypaea gigas) and the acute and diverging tips of the eyestalks (which are short, blunt and not diverging in Neotrypaea biffari).

== Ecology and human impact ==
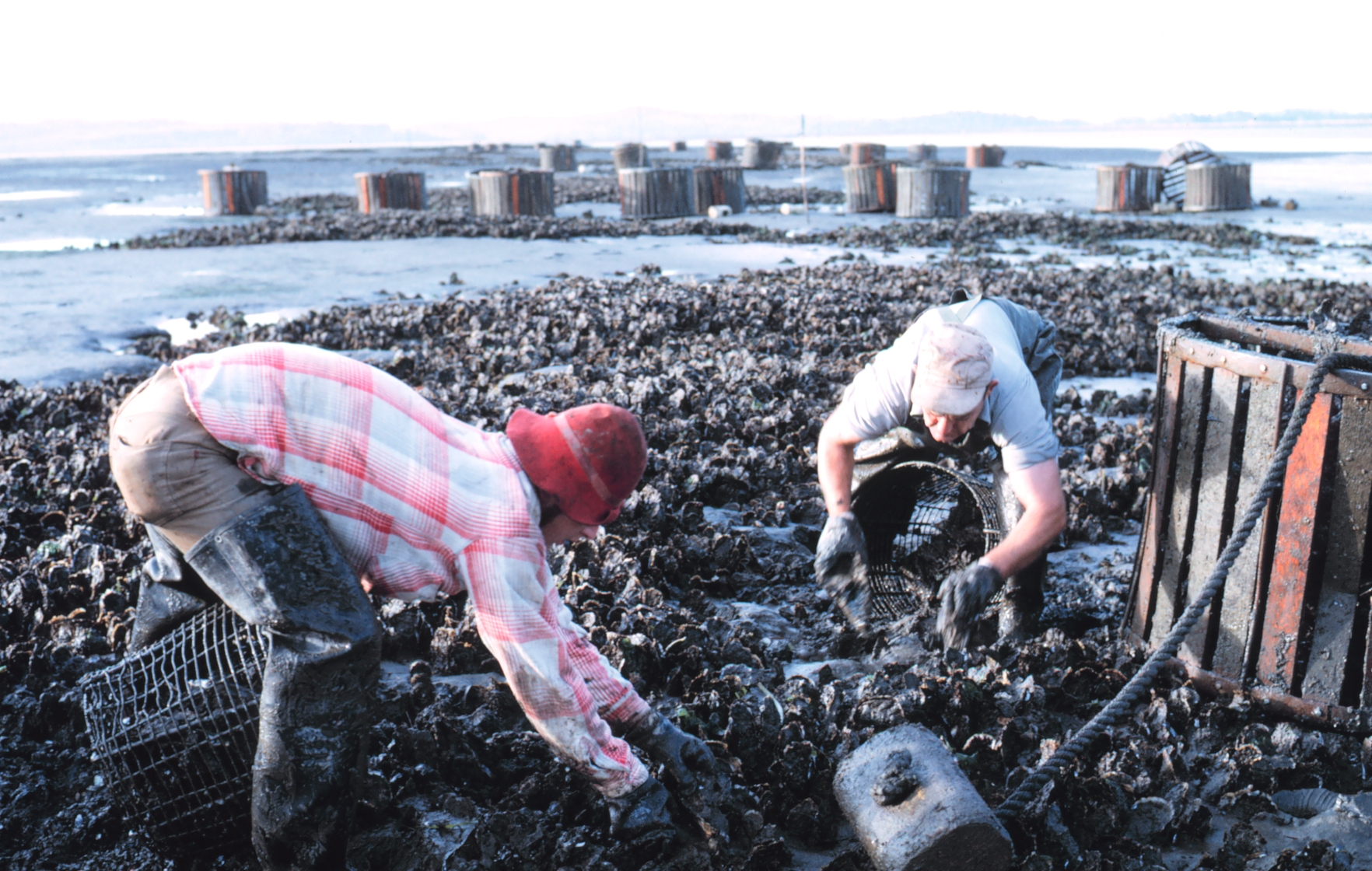
Oyster farming (seen here in Willapa Bay, Washington in 1969) is adversely affected by N. californiensis.

Both Neotrypaea californiensis and the mud shrimp Upogebia pugettensis live in mudflats and sandy substrates in the intertidal zone of estuaries in western North America. N. californiensis is found from Mutiny Bay, Alaska to Punta Abreojos, Mulegé, Baja California Sur, Mexico. Its habitat is also used for the aquaculture of the Pacific oyster, Crassostrea gigas. Since the bioturbation carried out by N. californiensis and U. pugettensis reduces the productivity of the oyster beds, they are considered pests. Their effects may, however, have knock-on effects across the entire ecosystem, and may buffer it from the hazards of nutrient enrichment and increase primary and secondary productivity by increasing the amount of dissolved inorganic nitrogen.

The burrows made by N. californiensis have many branches, and a number of other animals live in them, including snapping shrimp of the genus Betaeus, the copepod Clausidium vancouverense, and the crab Scleroplax granulata. The gut flora of N. californiensis includes a wide range of bacteria, comprising around 40% Alphaproteobacteria, 20% gram-positive bacteria, 20% Bacteroidota, and 5% of each of Gammaproteobacteria and Campylobacterota. Predators of N. californiensis include gray whales (Eschrichtius robustus), bottom-dwelling fish, and Dungeness crabs (Metacarcinus magister).

N. californiensis has a detrimental impact on oyster production, and as a result, the insecticide carbaryl (1-naphthyl N-methyl carbamate) has been sprayed in some areas (including Willapa Bay, Washington) to reduce the population of N. californiensis. The addition of shelly debris also reduces numbers of N. californiensis both by preventing the settlement of larvae, and through predation on the young N. californiensis by young Dungeness crabs in the shelly debris.

N. californiensis is used as fishing bait, and is frequently transported alive between U.S. states, prompting fears that existing population structure may be obliterated, and that it could introduce the castrating parasitic isopod Ione cornuta outside its native range.
