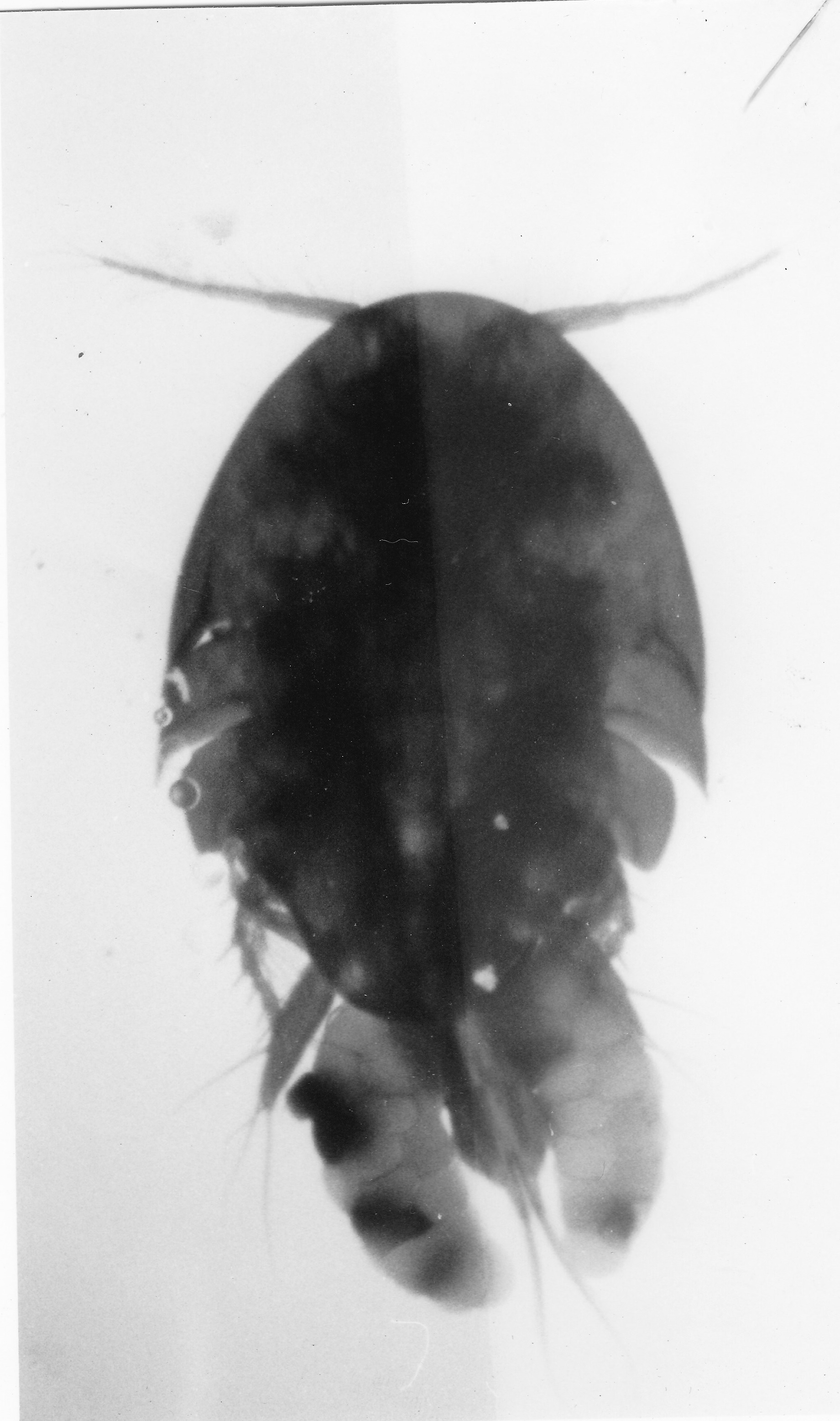
- Clausidium dissimile

Scientific classification
- Domain: Eukaryota
- Kingdom: Animalia
- Phylum: Arthropoda
- Class: Copepoda
- Order: Cyclopoida
- Family: Clausidiidae
- Genus: Clausidium; Kossmann, 1875

Synonyms
- Hersilia Philippi, 1839

= Clausidium =

Genus of crustaceans

Clausidium is a genus of copepods that have been found in subtopical to temperate coastal areas along the Pacific, Atlantic and Gulf coasts of North America, the Pacific and Atlantic Coasts of South America, the Atlantic and Mediterranean coasts of Europe, the Atlantic coast of Africa, and the coast of India.

All of the known species occur on the bodies of mud shrimp (a.k.a. ghost shrimp) of the families Callianassidae and Upogebiidae, or from water collected from their burrows. Clausidium adhere tenaciously to the host, moving easily over the surface, appendages and into the gill chamber. They are occasionally observed swimming free of the host; however, this behavior is uncommon. The relationship between Clausidium and its host has not been definitively characterized, but may be commensalism.

The adult male is much smaller than the adult female and is usually found firmly grasping the anal segment of the female.

Morphologically the genus is very homogeneous. The unique identifying features seem correlated with the two behaviors of adhesion to the host and the male prehension on the female. The endopod of leg 1 is thick and modified with suckers. Leg 1 of the female also has a distinct large blade-like seta. Partial suckers are on the endopods of legs 2 through 4. Folds and projections on the anal segment of the female apparently complement the structure of the male maxilliped.

Clausidium contains the following species:

- Clausidium apodiformis (Philippi, 1839)
- Clausidium californiense C. B. Wilson, 1935
- Clausidium caudatum (Say, 1818)
- Clausidium chelatum Pillai, 1959
- Clausidium dissimile C. B. Wilson, 1921
- Clausidium rodriguesi Kihara, and Rocha 2013
- Clausidium saldanhae Kensley, 1974
- Clausidium searsi C. B. Wilson, 1937
- Clausidium senegalense Humes, 1957
- Clausidium tenax Humes, 1949
- Clausidium testudo Kossmann, 1867
- Clausidium travancorense Pillai, 1959
- Clausidium vancouverense (Haddon, 1912)
