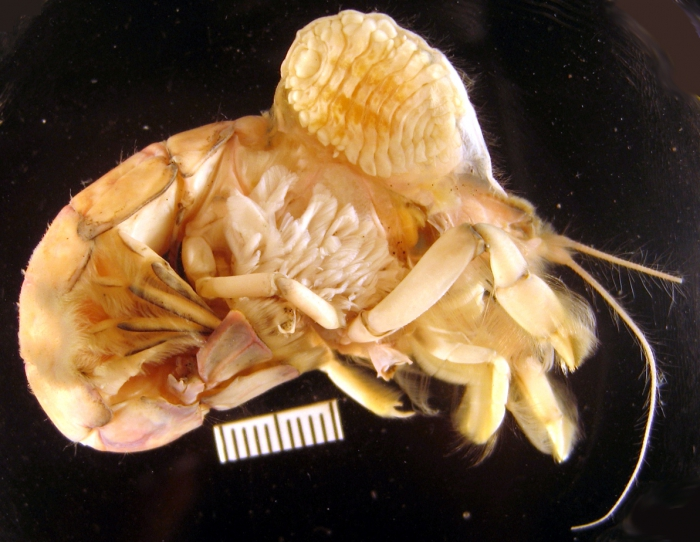

Scientific classification
- Kingdom: Animalia
- Phylum: Arthropoda
- Clade: Pancrustacea
- Class: Malacostraca
- Order: Isopoda
- Family: Bopyridae
- Subfamily: Pseudioninae
- Genus: Orthione; Markham, 1988

Species
- See text

= Orthione =

Genus of crustaceans

Orthione is a genus of Isopoda parasites, in the family Bopyridae, containing the following species:

- Orthione furcata (Richardson, 1904)
- Orthione griffenis Markham, 2004
- Orthione mesoamericana Markham, 2004
