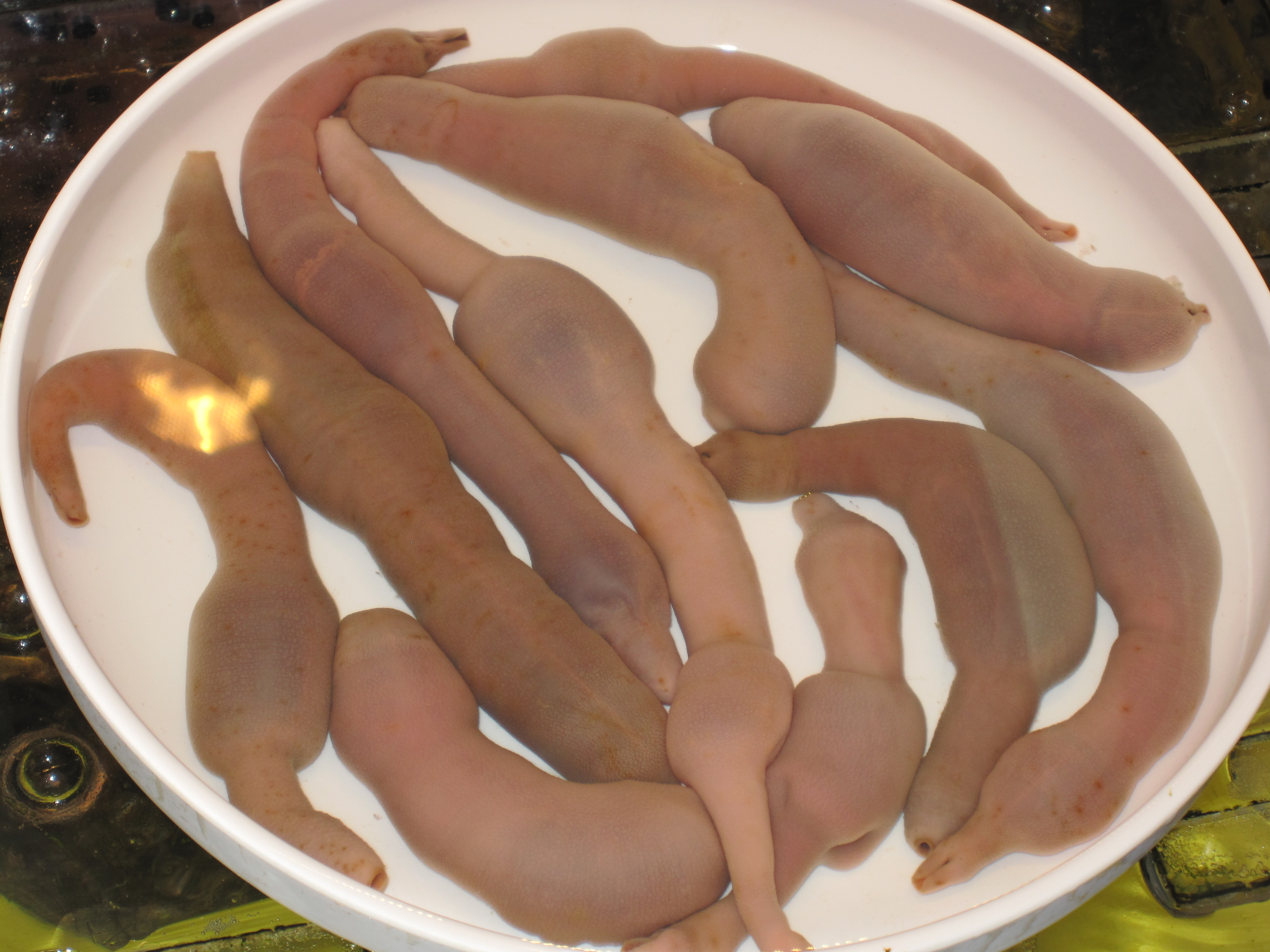
- Urechis unicinctus at a market in Korea

Scientific classification
- Kingdom: Animalia
- Phylum: Annelida
- Clade: Pleistoannelida
- Clade: Sedentaria
- Order: Capitellida
- Family: Thalassematidae
- Subfamily: Thalassematinae
- Tribe: Echiurini; Monro, 1927
- Genus: Urechis; Seitz, 1907

Species
- Urechis caupo; Urechis chilensis; Urechis novaezealandiae; Urechis unicinctus

= Urechis =

Family of annelid worms

Urechis (commonly known as "fat innkeeper" or "penis fish") is a spoon worm in the tribe Echiurini.

== Species ==
The World Register of Marine Species includes these species in this genus:-

- Urechis caupo Fisher & MacGinitie, 1928
- Urechis chilensis (M. Müller, 1852)
- Urechis novaezealandiae (Dendy, 1898)
- Urechis unicinctus (Drasche, 1880)
