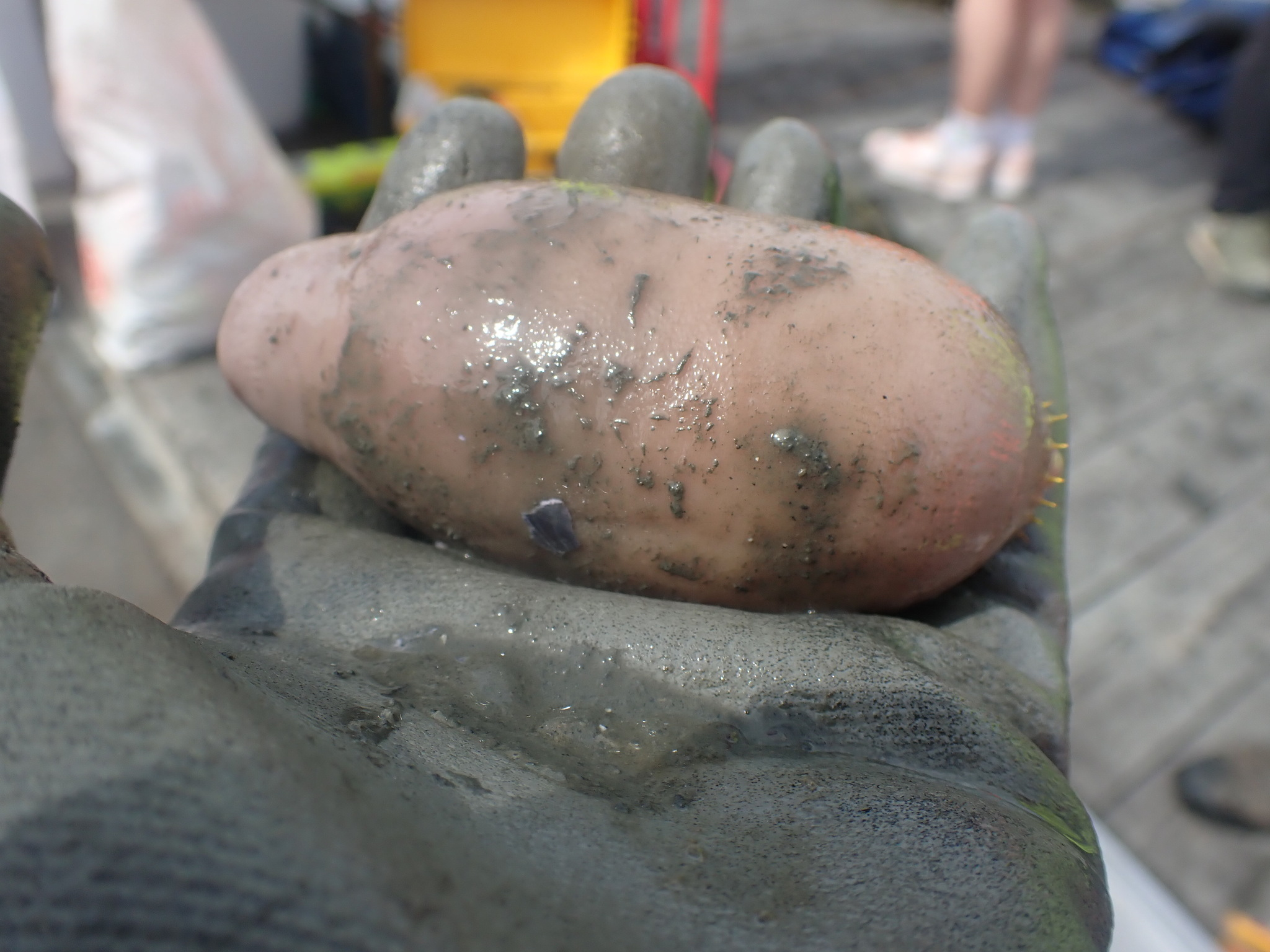

Scientific classification
- Kingdom: Animalia
- Phylum: Annelida
- Clade: Pleistoannelida
- Clade: Sedentaria
- Subclass: Echiura
- Order: Echiuroidea
- Family: Urechidae
- Genus: Urechis
- Species: U. novaezealandiae

Binomial name
- Urechis novaezealandiae (Dendy, 1898)

Synonyms
- Echiurus novaezealandiae

= Urechis novaezealandiae =

Species of annelid worm

Urechis novaezealandiae is a species of Urechidae endemic to New Zealand. It is commonly known as a "spoon worm".

== Taxonomy ==
This species was described as Echiurus novaezealandiae in 1898 by Arthur Dendy. It was redescribed in 1957. The lectotype is stored in Canterbury Museum.

== Description ==
This species is shaped like a sausage. It has been recorded up to 545mm in length.

== Distribution ==
This species is endemic to New Zealand.
