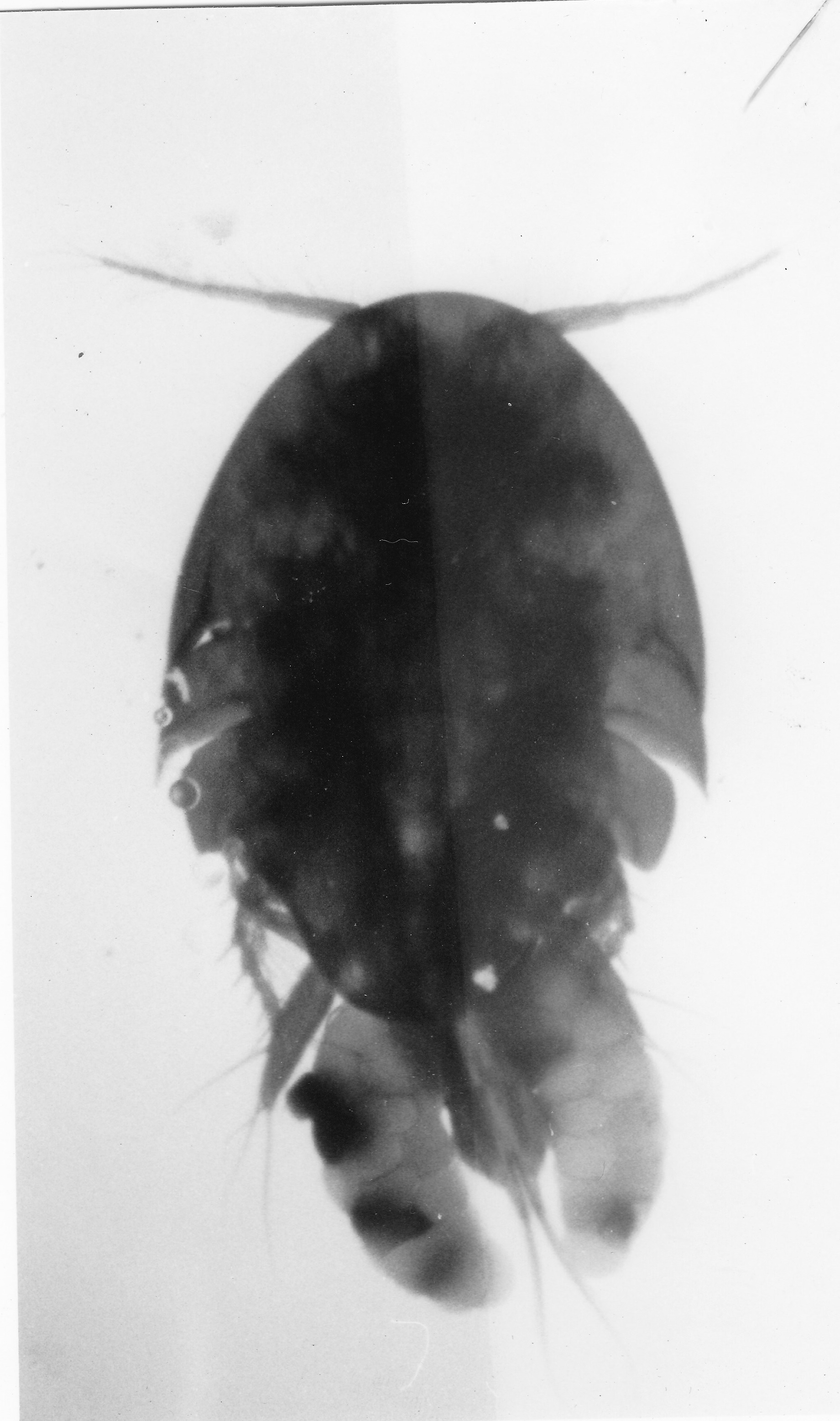
- Clausidium dissimile

Scientific classification
- Kingdom: Animalia
- Phylum: Arthropoda
- Clade: Pancrustacea
- Class: Copepoda
- Order: Cyclopoida
- Suborder: Ergasilida
- Family: Clausidiidae; Embleton, 1901

= Clausidiidae =

Family of crustaceans

Clausidiidae is a family of parasitic copepods in the order Cyclopoida, containing the following genera:

- Cemihyclops Karanovic, 2008
- Clausidium Kossmann, 1875
- Conchyliurus Bocquet & Stock, 1957
- Foliomolgus I. M. Kim, 2001
- Giardella Canu, 1888
- Goodingius I. M. Kim, 2007
- Hamaticyclops Kim I.H., 2015
- Hemadona I. M. Kim & Ho, 2003
- Hemicyclops Boeck, 1872
- Hersiliodes Canu, 1888
- Hippomolgus G. O. Sars, 1917
- Hyphalion Humes, 1987
- Leptinogaster Pelseneer, 1929
- Pholadicola Ho & Wardle, 1992
- Pontoclausia Bacescu & Por, 1959
- Pseudopsyllus T. Scott, 1902
