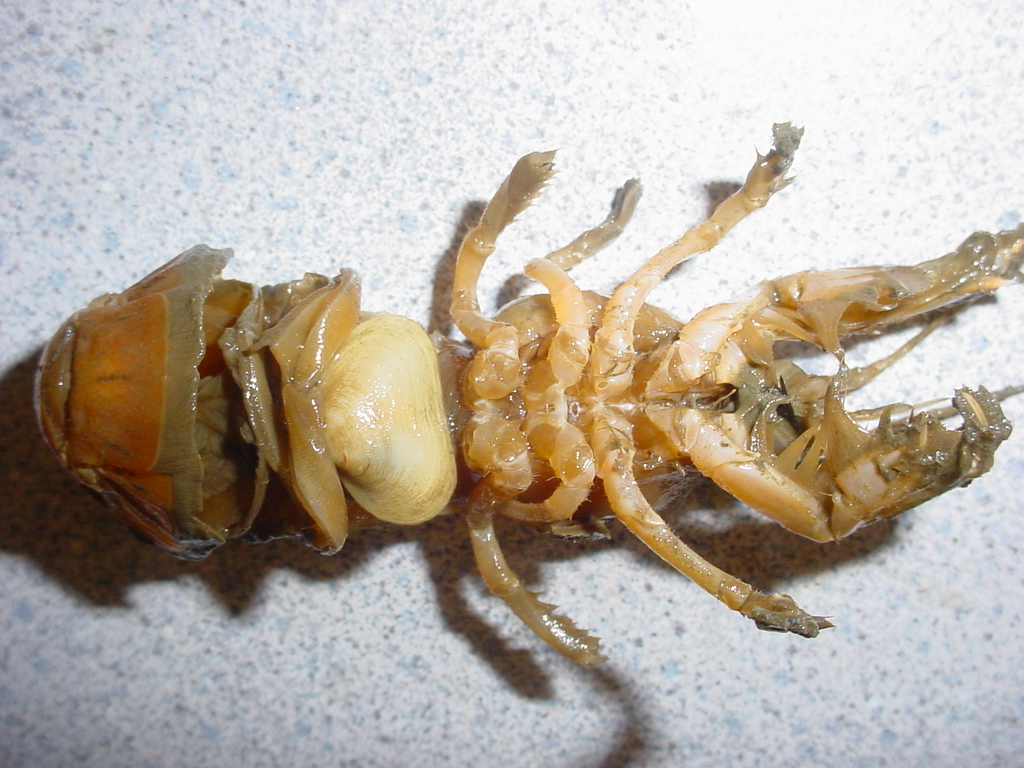
- Neaeromya rugifera on the underside of Upogebia pugettensis

Scientific classification
- Kingdom: Animalia
- Phylum: Mollusca
- Class: Bivalvia
- Order: Galeommatida
- Family: Lasaeidae
- Genus: Neaeromya
- Species: N. rugifera

Binomial name
- Neaeromya rugifera (Carpenter, 1864)

Synonyms
- Lepton rude Dall in Whiteaves, 1880; Erycina chacei Dall, 1916; Pseudopythina myaciformis Dall, 1916; Pseudopythina rugifera Carpenter, 1864; Pythina rugifera Carpenter, 1864

= Neaeromya rugifera =

Species of bivalve

Neaeromya rugifera is a species of bivalve that inhabits the West Coast of North America.

== Description ==
Neaeromya rugifera is a species of symbiotic bivalve that can be found on the abdomen of Upogebia pugettensis and on the ventral surface of Aphrodita, a genus of polychaete worm. They can attach and detach themselves at will using their byssus. The largest examples of the species were found to be 6mm in length, 2.5mm in height, and 1.5mm in width. N. rugifera do possess teeth, but no chondrophore. One investigation of stomach contents found remains of diatoms and protozoans. Sexual dimorphism is seen as female N. rugifera being larger than their male counterparts. Males can be found to reside in the mantle cavity of females. A 2008 study found no evidence of N. rugifera causing weight loss in U. pugettensis.

== Distribution ==
Neaeromya rugifera is spread across the West Coast, from Kodiak, Alaska, to Punta Rompiente, Baja California.
