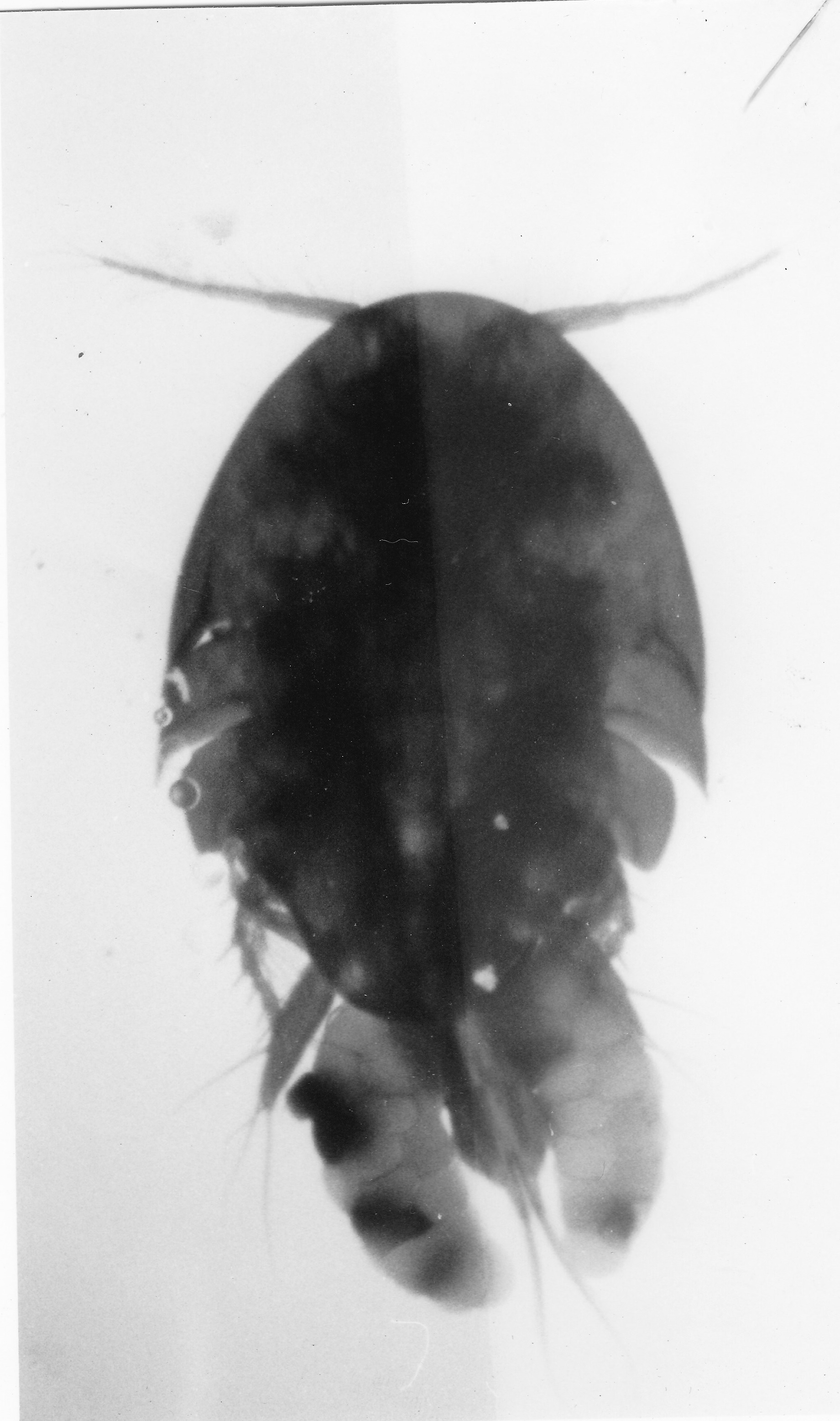
- Adult female C. dissimile

Scientific classification
- Domain: Eukaryota
- Kingdom: Animalia
- Phylum: Arthropoda
- Class: Copepoda
- Order: Cyclopoida
- Family: Clausidiidae
- Genus: Clausidium
- Species: C. dissimile

Binomial name
- Clausidium dissimile Wilson, 1921

= Clausidium dissimile =

Species of crustacean

Clausidium dissimile is a species of copepod that has been found along the Atlantic and Gulf Coasts from Massachusetts to Florida. They are found on the bodies of mud shrimp (a.k.a. ghost shrimp) of the family Callianassidae, or from water collected from mud shrimp burrows.

== Description ==
Clausidium dissimile is bright red with the deepest color along the margins of the segments. Pigmented areas often form dense irregular masses on either side of the gut. After several weeks in the laboratory the intensity of the color begins to decrease. The red pigmentation was observed in the naupliar, juvenile, and adult stages.

The female is short, broad and strongly flattened. It does not have visible eyes. The antennae are not nonprehensile. As characteristic of the genus, the endopods of the first four pairs of legs have sucking disks and the endopod of the first pair of legs has a distinct large flattened plate on the inner margin. Bright orange egg strings may be attached to the genital segment on the left and right sides. The eggs are large and spherical, 25 or 30 in each string. The total length is approximately 1.25 to 1.5 mm and the cephalothorax width is approximately 1 mm.

The adult male is much smaller than the female. The total length is approximately 0.6 to 0.7 mm and the cephalothorax width is approximately 0.30 mm. It is elongate and slender with appendages like those of the female. It is usually found firmly grasping the anal segment of the female. Besides its size, the chief differences are the maxillipeds and the first pair of legs, both of which are used to grasp the female. The males begin pairing with the juvenile copepodid IV and V stage females.

== Distribution and hosts ==
Clausidium dissimile are found on the bodies of mud shrimp (a.k.a. ghost shrimp) of the family Callianassidae. They adhere tenaciously to the host, moving easily over the surface, appendages and into the gill chamber. They are occasionally observed swimming free of the host; however, this behavior is uncommon. It appears that C. dissimile can infest any species of Callianassidae that occurs within its range of environmental tolerance. This is a list of known hosts and locations where C. dissimile was captured and identified. C. dissimile can be dislodged during the capture and preservation process. Unless epizoic copepods are the object of the search, the copepods are usually overlooked and lost.

Unknown; North Falmouth, Massachusetts Callianassa spp. (probably C. stimpsoni); Cold Spring Harbor, Long Island, New York

Gilvossius setimanus (Syn. Callianassa stimpsoni, Callianassa atlantica); Vineyard Sound, Massachusetts

Unknown; Wassaw Sound, Cabbage Island, Chatham County, Georgia

Callichirus major; North Beach, St. Catherines Island, Georgia

Callichirus major (Syn. Callianassa major); Beaufort, North Carolina

Lepidophthalmus louisianensis; Tampa Bay, Florida

Sergio trilobata; Tampa Bay, Florida

Lepidophthalmus louisianensis (Syn. Callianassa jamaicense); Wakulla Beach, Wakulla County, Florida

Callichirus islagrande (Syn. Callianassa islagrande); Alligator Point, Franklin County, Florida

Lepidophthalmus louisianensis (Syn. Callianassa jamaicense); Big Sabine Point, Santa Rosa Sound, Pensacola Beach, Florida

Biffarius biformis (Syn. Callianassa biformis); Big Sabine Point, Santa Rosa Sound, Pensacola Beach, Florida

Sergio trilobata (Syn. Callianassa trilobata); Big Sabine Point, Santa Rosa Sound, Pensacola Beach, Florida

== Ecology ==
The relationship between C. dissimile and its host has not been definitively characterized, but is not likely to be parasitism. The mouth parts are not suited either for mastication or suction. They appear to be adopted for licking up nourishment from the surface of the host.

The host is not frequently seen outside its burrow which can be 2 meters deep. This behavior can provide protection for C. dissimile from predators that cannot enter the burrow.

The host maintains the microenvironment of the burrow by circulating water with its pleopods. The host generated current brings into the burrow suspended plankton and other particles which can accumulate on the host. An examination of the gut contents of C. dissimile showed diatom frustules along with unidentified material. C. dissimile were also observed beating their antennae causing a current which moved suspended particles to the mouth. It is likely that C. dissimile is feeding on material that accumulates on the host. C. dissimile kept in a bowl of seawater without a host lived for 69 days before the test was terminated.

When dislodged from its host, C. dissimile will remount on the same or another host upon contact. It has been shown that adult females cannot locate the host at a distance via rheotaxis or chemotaxis.

Clausidium dissimile has been found in estuarine habitats and areas exposed to the open ocean. C. dissimile shows stress by abandoning its host when the salinity of the water falls below 15 ppt and appears moribund at 10 ppt. In the field this species was found at locations where the low salinity extremes were occasionally below 10 ppt. At an estuarine location that is subject to occasional freshwater conditions, the heavier higher salinity water in the borrow can provide protection from freshwater exposure.

The host pumps water into the burrow which keeps the interior oxygenated. C. dissimile can tolerate hypoxia for three days. This ability may allow it to survive periods when water circulation is reduced or eliminated by low tides or sand clogging the burrow entrance.

At Big Sabine Point, Pensacola Beach, Florida, C. dissimile begins settling on the host at the copepodid II and III stages in March and April. The settling of early juveniles extends until October. The ratio of adult males to females typically ranged from 1:1 to 3:1, with 6:1 not unusual. Over 95% of the hosts were infested. The maximum number of copepods on an individual host could range from a few hundred to over 1,000. At a location in Tampa Bay, Florida, the maximum infestation rates observed was approximately 90 to 100 copepods per host. The infested mud shrimp did not exhibit adverse effects.

Clausidium dissimile are capable of leaving the host and can be collected from samples of burrow water. In the laboratory they are occasionally observed swimming free of the host and moving between hosts when multiple hosts were in the same container. This was especially apparent when the host is injured or dying.

In Tampa Bay, Florida, C. dissimile colonizes ‘’Sergio trilobata’’ at a higher frequency than ‘’Lepidophthalmus louisianensis’’. In the laboratory this preference occurred no matter which host C. dissimile had formerly inhabited. The copepods seem to base their selection of host primarily on the size of the host, rather than the sex of the host.
