= Harry H. Pennes =

American physician

Harry H. Pennes (May 29, 1918 – November 14, 1963, New York City) was an American physician and clinical researcher who studied the neurological effects of drugs and the pharmacological treatment of various psychoses. He also introduced a mathematical model of the rate of heat production by human tissue as it relates to local blood flow. Pennes' equation, also called Pennes' bioheat equation, has been the foundation of hundreds of papers on bioheat transfer and the 1948 paper in which it was introduced, "Analysis of tissue and arterial blood temperatures in the resting human forearm", has become one of the most influential articles that have appeared in the Journal of Applied Physiology.

Pennes killed himself at the age of 45 in his home on 317 West End Avenue.
