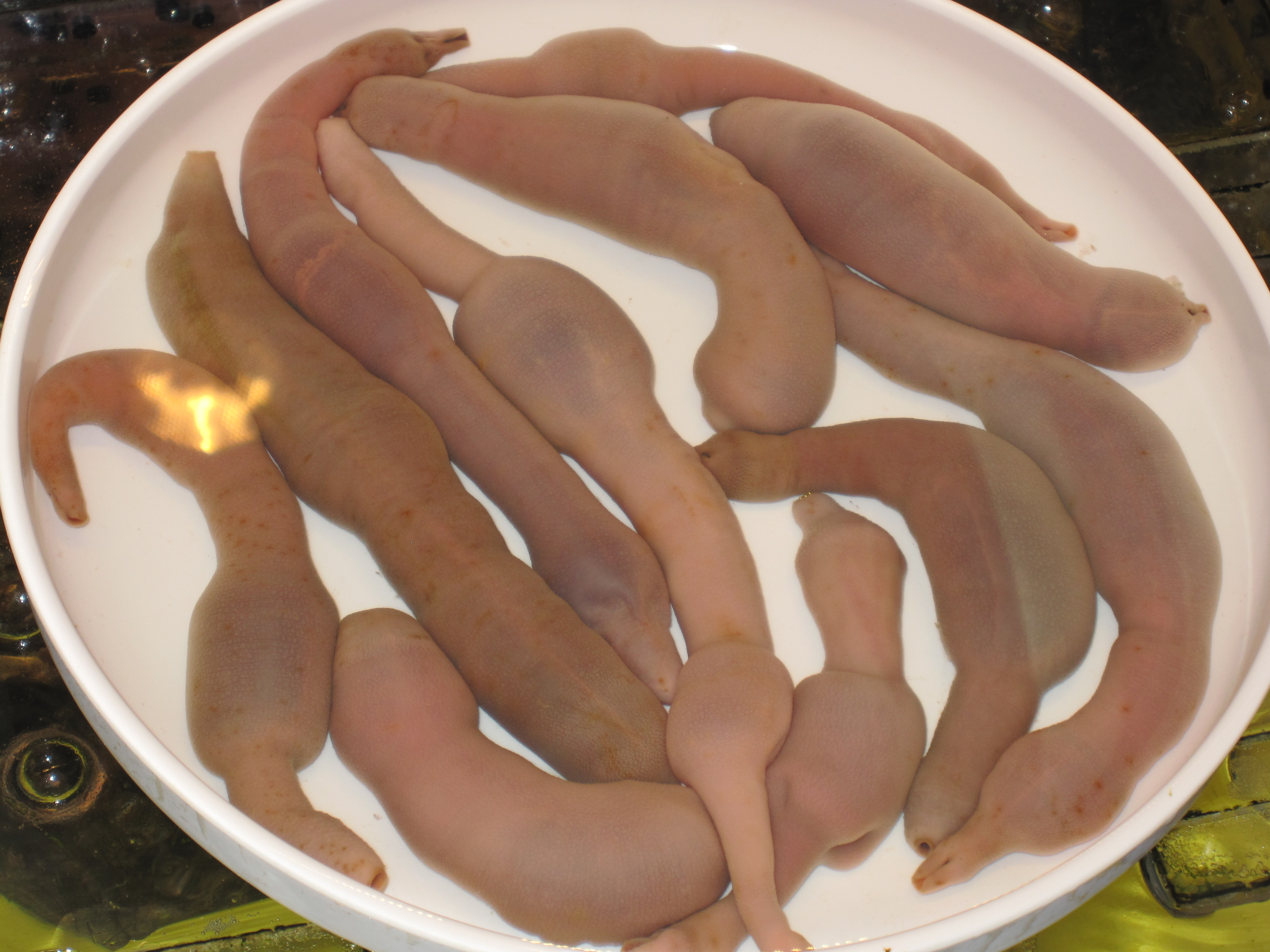
- Urechis unicinctus at a market in Korea.

Scientific classification
- Kingdom: Animalia
- Phylum: Annelida
- Clade: Pleistoannelida
- Clade: Sedentaria
- Subclass: Echiura
- Order: Echiuroidea
- Family: Urechidae
- Genus: Urechis
- Species: U. unicinctus

Binomial name
- Urechis unicinctus von Drasche, 1881

= Urechis unicinctus =

Species of annelid worm

Urechis unicinctus, known as the fat innkeeper worm or penis fish, is a species of marine spoon worm in East Asia. It is found in Bohai Gulf of China and off the Korean and Hokkaido coasts. It is not to be confused with a closely related species, Urechis caupo, which occurs on the western coast of North America and shares common names. The body is about 10–30 centimetres (4–12 inches) long, cylindrical in shape and yellowish-brown in color. On the surface of the body, there are many small papillae.

== Ecology ==
This spoonworm is a detritivore, feeding on detritus and lives and burrows in sand and mud like other Urechis species. It creates a U-shaped burrow in the soft sediment of the seabed. A ring of glands at the front of the proboscis secrete mucus which sticks to the burrow wall. The worm continues to exude mucus as it moves backwards in the burrow thus creating a mucus net. The worm draws water through its burrow by peristaltic contractions of its body and food particles adhere to the net. When enough food is gathered, the worm moves forward in its burrow and swallows the net and entangled food. This process is repeated, and in an area with plenty of detritus, may be completed in only a few minutes.

Large numbers have been known to become stranded on beaches in Japan; the original theory was that they were beached due to sea storms, but scientists have theorized that they swim at night to reproduce, which would raise the chances of beachings.

== Aquaculture ==
While some harvest is from wild collection, aquaculture of U. unicinctus is becoming more prevalent. It is primarily farmed in ponds and mudflats, with a more limited amount produced through industrial cultivation. In regions like Shandong, Hebei, and Liaoning, farmers have explored mixed cultivation methods, co-cultivating U. unicinctus with other commercially valuable species such as the sea cucumber (Apostichopus japonicus), the kuruma shrimp (Penaeus japonicus), and the Pacific white shrimp (Litopenaeus vannamei).

== Uses ==
In Korea, it is called Gaebul (Korean: 개불), which means a dog's testicle or penis. They are eaten as food, often raw with salt and sesame oil or gochujang. They are distributed in Korea, Hokkaido, and the Pacific coast.

In Chinese cuisine, the worm is stir-fried with vegetables, or dried and powdered to be used as an umami enhancer.

It is also used as fishing bait for fish such as flounder and sea bream.

Urechis unicinctus filmed in a Weihai restaurant in Shandong province, China

Urechis unicinctus

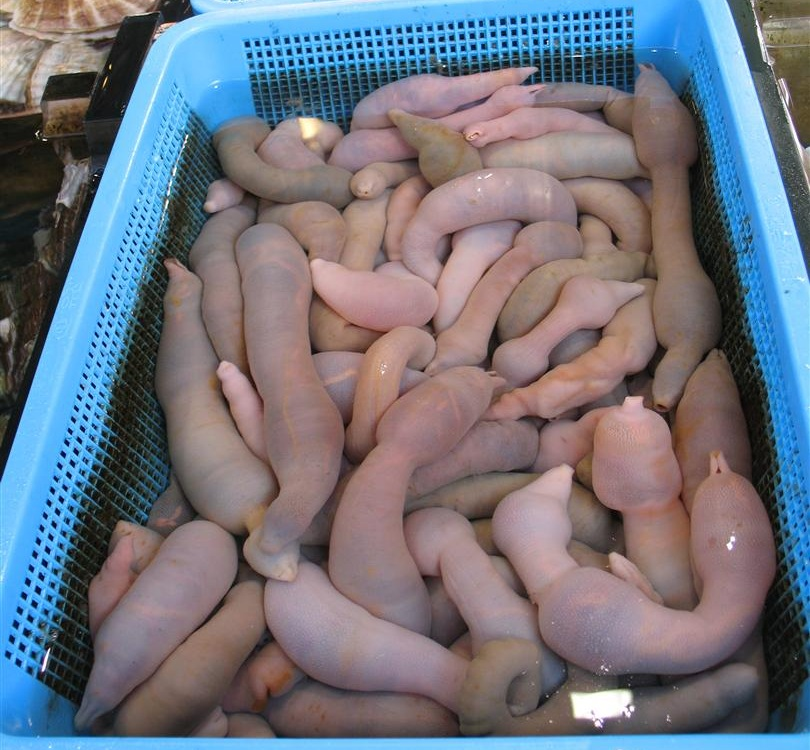
Urechis unicinctus (개불; gaebul) sold at a fish market at Busan, South Korea.

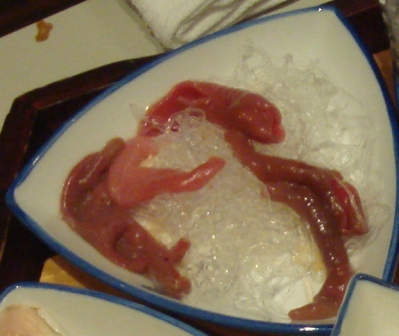
Urechis unicinctus served as hoe in a restaurant in South Korea.
