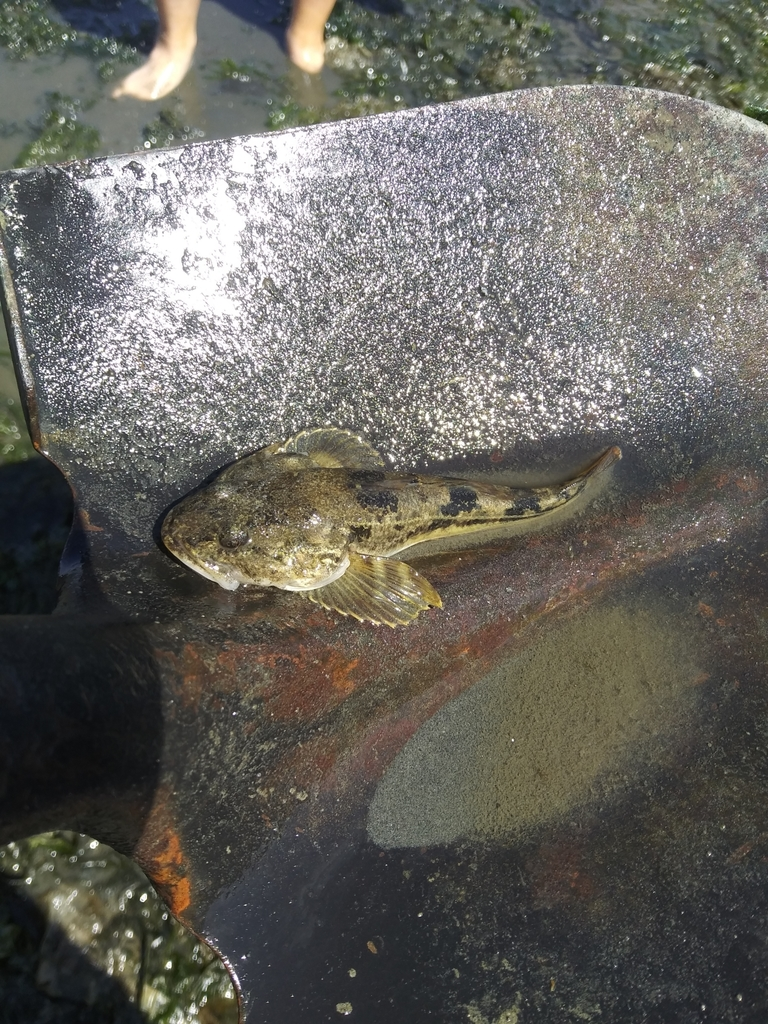

Conservation status
- Least Concern (IUCN 3.1)

Scientific classification
- Kingdom: Animalia
- Phylum: Chordata
- Class: Actinopterygii
- Order: Perciformes
- Suborder: Cottoidei
- Superfamily: Cottoidea
- Family: Cottidae
- Genus: Leptocottus; Girard, 1854
- Species: L. armatus

Binomial name
- Leptocottus armatus Girard, 1854

= Pacific staghorn sculpin =

Species of fish

The Pacific staghorn sculpin (Leptocottus armatus) is a species of marine ray-finned fish belonging to the family Cottidae, the typical sculpins. This species is found in the eastern Pacific Ocean. It is the only species in the monospecific genus Leptocottus.

== Taxonomy ==
The Pacific staghorn sculpin was first formally described in 1854 by the French biologist Charles Frédéric Girard with its type locality given as San Francisco in California. Girard placed it in a new monospecific genus, Leptocottus. The 5th edition of Fishes of the World classifies the genus Leptocottus within the subfamily Cottinae of the family Cottidae,

== Etymology ==
The Pacific staghorn sculpin's genus name, Leptocottus, is a combination of leptos, meaning "slender", and Cottus. The specific name armatus means "armed", a reference to the large and sharp spines on the preoperculum.

== Description ==
Pacific staghorn sculpins are slender fish, with a wide, large, highly flattened head with a body which tapers towards the tail. Its overall color is grayish-olive on the upper body, there a few yellow tints and it fades to creamy yellow on the underside. They are reported to be able to change their color to camouflage them. The anal and pelvic fins are lighter and the caudal fin is dusky with 1 or 2 light-colored bars. The dorsal fins are continuous with the first dorsal fin being marked with black spots close to the tips of the rearmost 3 spines and a white band long its base, while the second dorsal fin is dusky with a number of diagonal white to yellowish bands. The pectoral fins are yellow marked with 5 or 6 dark green bars. The large eyes are placed on the top of the head and they have a large wide mouth containing many small teeth. The preoperculum has a large spine that ends in three or four sharp, recurved spinules. The dorsal fins are supported by between 6 and 8 spines and between 15 and 20 soft rays while the anal fin has 14 to 20 rays. The caudal fin is rounded. They lack any scales and the lateral line is straight. This species reaches a maximum total length of 46 cm (18 in) but 35 cm (14 in) is more typical.

== Distribution and habitat ==
The Pacific staghorn sculpin is found in the eastern Pacific Ocean along the western coast of North America from the Izembek Lagoon, on the southeastern Bering Sea coast of Alaska south as far as San Quintín, Baja California. These sculpins are commonly found near the shore, particularly in bays and estuaries; most often on sandy substrates. As adults they are found in sheltered marine estuaries while the juveniles are found in freshwater streams and upper estuarine environments.

== Biology ==
The Pacific staghorn sculpin is a largely marine fish which spends the majority of its life in saline and brackish waters but they can adapt to both fresh and hypersaline waters. The larval stage starts in estuarine environments, being found over soft and sandy substrates. The juveniles leave the estuary, many ascending the rivers into fresh water and most of the fish recorded in freshwater or less saline habitats are young juveniles. These feed on amphipods, invertebrates, small fish, and aquatic insect larvae. The older fishes tend to be found further upstream than the young fish which move into the rivers from marine or estuary environments. Fish living in the sea may move in and out with the tide and prey on crabs, shrimp and other fish. Feeding is mainly nocturnal but they will forage at any time of the day. Spawning takes place in salt or brackish water between October and April, although in California they spawn in January and February. Each female lays between 2 and 10 thousand eggs and following spawning adults rapidly leave for deeper waters. The eggs take 10 days to hatch into larvae. They can breathe air when out of the water. They will bury themselves in sandy substrates.

== Bibliography ==
- Peter B. Moyle, Inland Fishes of California (University of California Press, 2002), pp. 361–363
