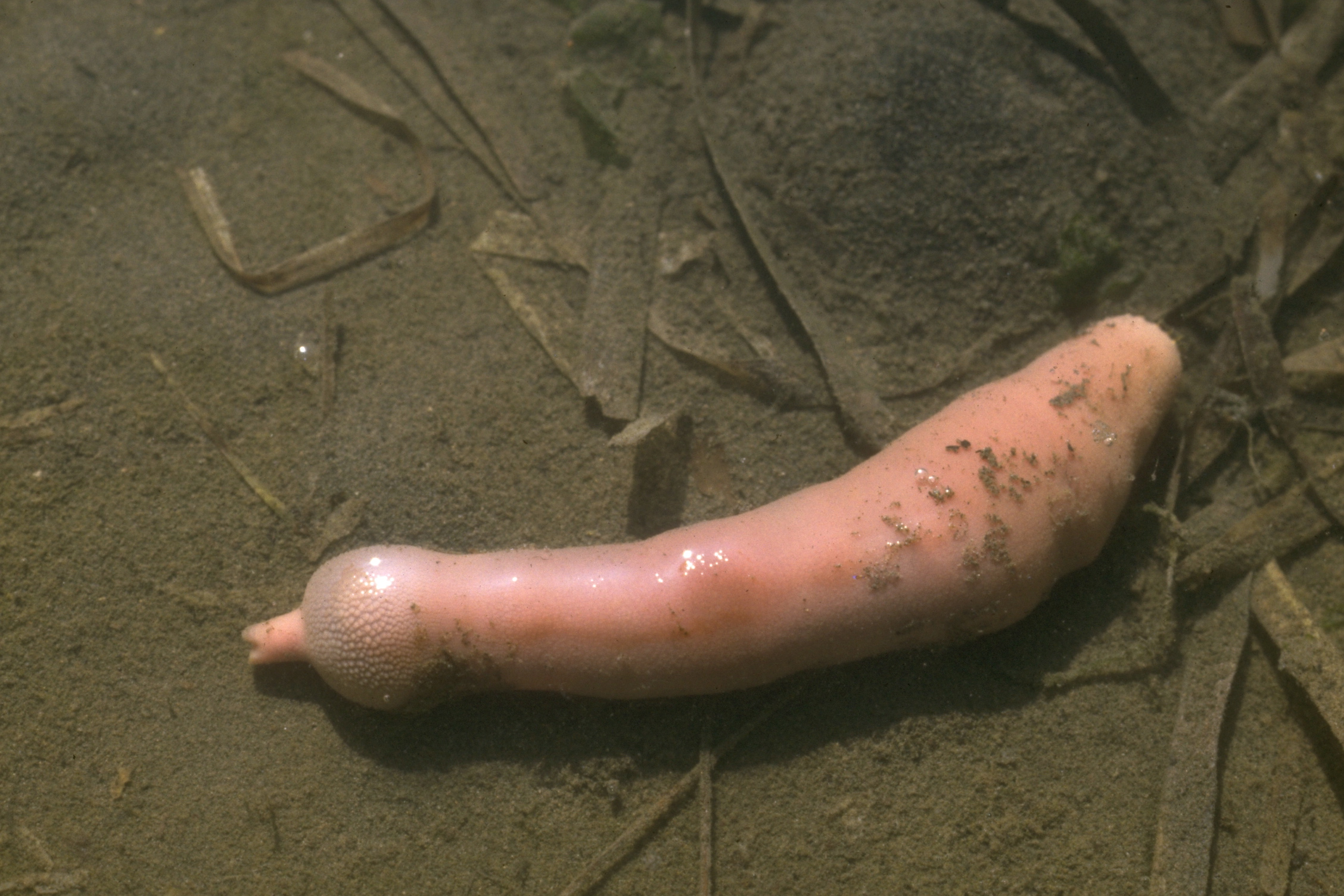

Scientific classification
- Kingdom: Animalia
- Phylum: Annelida
- Clade: Pleistoannelida
- Clade: Sedentaria
- Subclass: Echiura
- Order: Echiuroidea
- Family: Urechidae
- Genus: Urechis
- Species: U. caupo

Binomial name
- Urechis caupo Fisher & MacGinitie, 1928

= Urechis caupo =

Species of annelid worm

Urechis caupo is a species of spoon worm in the family Urechidae, commonly known as the innkeeper echiuran, the fat innkeeper worm (because their tunnels often contain other animals), the innkeeper worm, or the penis fish. It is found in shallow water on the west coast of North America, between southern Oregon and Baja California, where it forms a U-shaped burrow in the sediment and feeds on plankton using a mucus net.

== Description ==
Urechis caupo is a plump, unsegmented, cylindrical pink worm growing to a length of up to 7 inches, with 5.5 inches being a more typical length. There are a pair of setae (bristles) on the ventral surface at the anterior end, and a distinctive ring of about ten setae around the anus at the posterior end. The proboscis is short.

== Distribution and habitat ==
Shallow water in the northeastern Pacific Ocean is the habitat of U. caupo; its range extends from southern Oregon to northern Baja California. It lives in a burrow in muddy sand in the lower intertidal and the shallow subtidal zone.

Thousands of these worms occasionally wash up on beaches in northern California. One such stranding took place on December 6, 2019, at Drake's Beach near Pt. Reyes. This was likely the result of recent storm weather which disturbed the worms' burrows.

== Ecology ==
This spoon worm is a detritivore and creates a U-shaped burrow in the soft sediment of the seabed. When feeding, it presses a ring of glands at the front of the proboscis against the burrow wall and secretes mucus which sticks to the burrow wall. The worm continues to exude mucus as it moves backwards in the burrow, thus creating a mucus net. The worm draws water through its burrow by peristaltic contractions of its body and as food particles pass through the net they adhere to it. When enough food is gathered, the worm moves forward in its burrow and swallows the net and entangled food. This process is repeated, and in an area with plenty of detritus, may be completed in only a few minutes. Faecal pellets accumulate around the worm's anus, and periodically the worm contracts its body sharply to produce a stream of water from the anus that blasts the pellets and loose sediment from the tube, creating a casting on the surface of the sand.

Larger food particles are rejected and discarded in the burrow where they provide food for the many different commensal organisms which share the burrow, resulting in this spoon worm being known as the "innkeeper worm". These include the California softshell clam (Cryptomya californica), pea crabs, shrimps and scaleworms. The arrow goby (Clevelandia ios) uses the entrance of the burrow as a refuge into which it can dash if danger threatens. The gut of the spoon worm often contains many trophozoites of the protozoan Zygosoma globosum.

The sexes are separate and fertilisation is external. The eggs are pinkish or yellowish and the sperm are white, being liberated into the water through a pair of modified nephridia. The larvae are planktonic for about sixty days before settling on the seabed; they are strongly attracted to settle in the vicinity of other spoon worms by a chemical released from the castings.
