= Bonellia =

Bonellia is the scientific name of several genera of organisms and may refer to:

- Bonellia (annelid) Rolando, 1821, a genus of spoon worms in the family Bonelliidae
- Bonellia (gastropod) Deshayes, 1838, a genus of snails in the family Eulimidae
- Bonellia (plant), a genus of plants in the family Primulaceae
