= Thomas Harvey Johnston =

Australian biologist and parasitologist

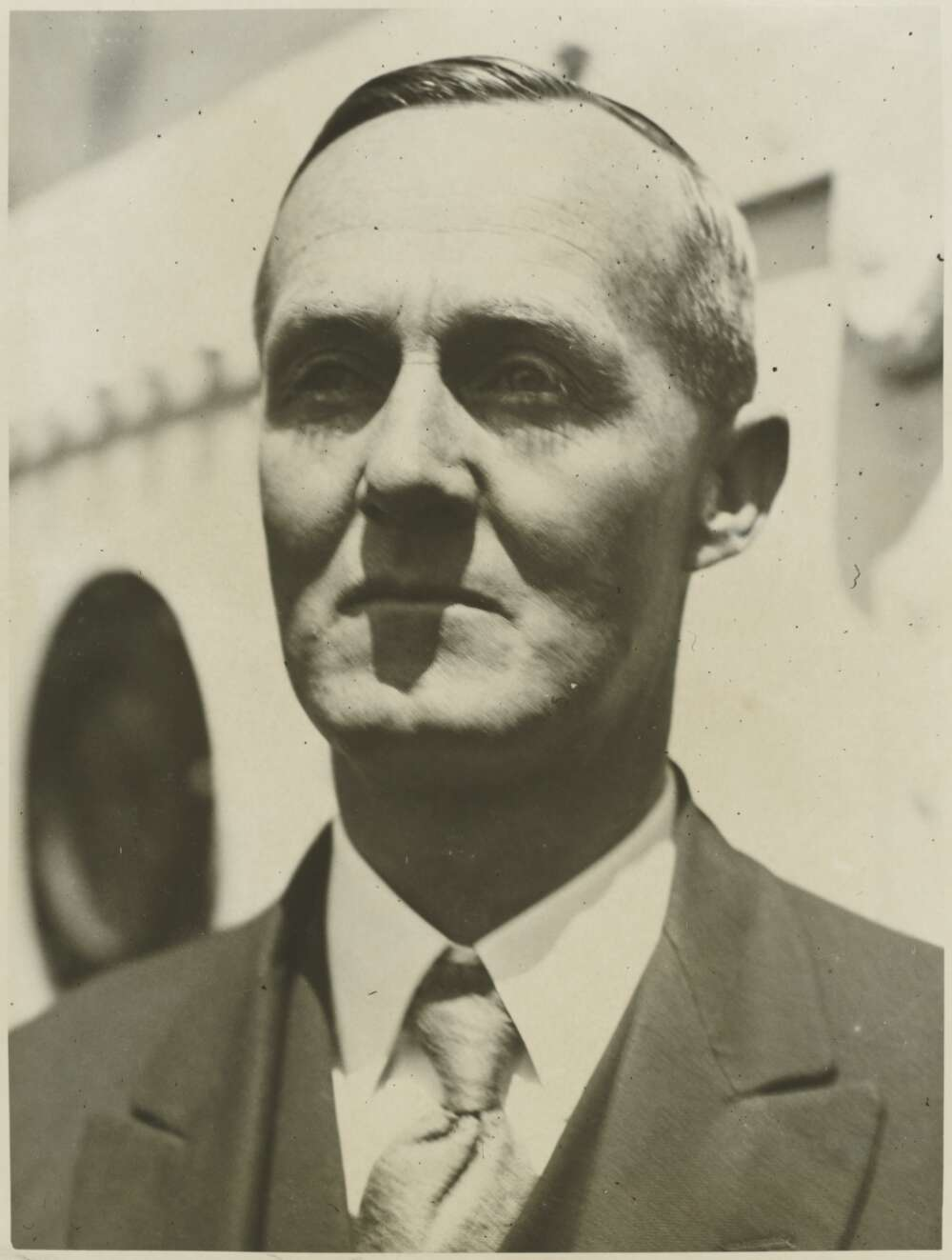
Thomas Harvey Johnston, circa 1930

Thomas Harvey Johnston (9 December 1881 – 30 August 1951) was an Australian biologist and parasitologist. He championed the efforts to eradicate the invasive prickly pear.

== Life and times ==
Johnston was born in 1881 at Balmain, Sydney, Australia the son of Thomas Johnston, an Irish-born foreman mason, and his Australian-born wife Mary, née McLeod. On 1 January 1907, Johnston married Alice Maude Pearce at Petersham, New South Wales, Australia. On 30 August 1951, he died of coronary thrombosis at Adelaide, South Australia. He was survived by his wife and daughter. His son predeceased him. He was cremated.

== Academic career ==
Johnston attended Sydney Teachers College and received the Jones Memorial Medal. He then attended the University of Sydney and earned a BA in 1906, the BSc and MA in 1907 and received the DSc in parasitology in 1911. From 1903 to 1906, Johnston taught at Fort Street Public School. He then accepted a position at Sydney Technical College and from 1907 to 1908 taught zoology and physiology. In 1908, he was appointed assistant director at Bathurst Technical College.

In 1909, Johnston accepted a position as assistant microbiologist at the New South Wales Health Department in the Bureau of Microbiology. The next appointment came in 1911, at the University of Queensland as lecturer in charge of the department of biology. In 1919, Johnston was promoted to professor.

In 1922, Johnston received an appointment at the University of Adelaide as professor of zoology and remained in that position for the rest of his life. From 1928 to 1934, he held the position as professor of botany.

Johnston joined a university anthropological expedition to Nepabunna Mission in the northern Flinders Ranges in May 1937 led by J.B. Cleland, which included Charles P. Mountford as ethnologist and photographer, virologist Frank Fenner, and others.

== Prickly pear ==
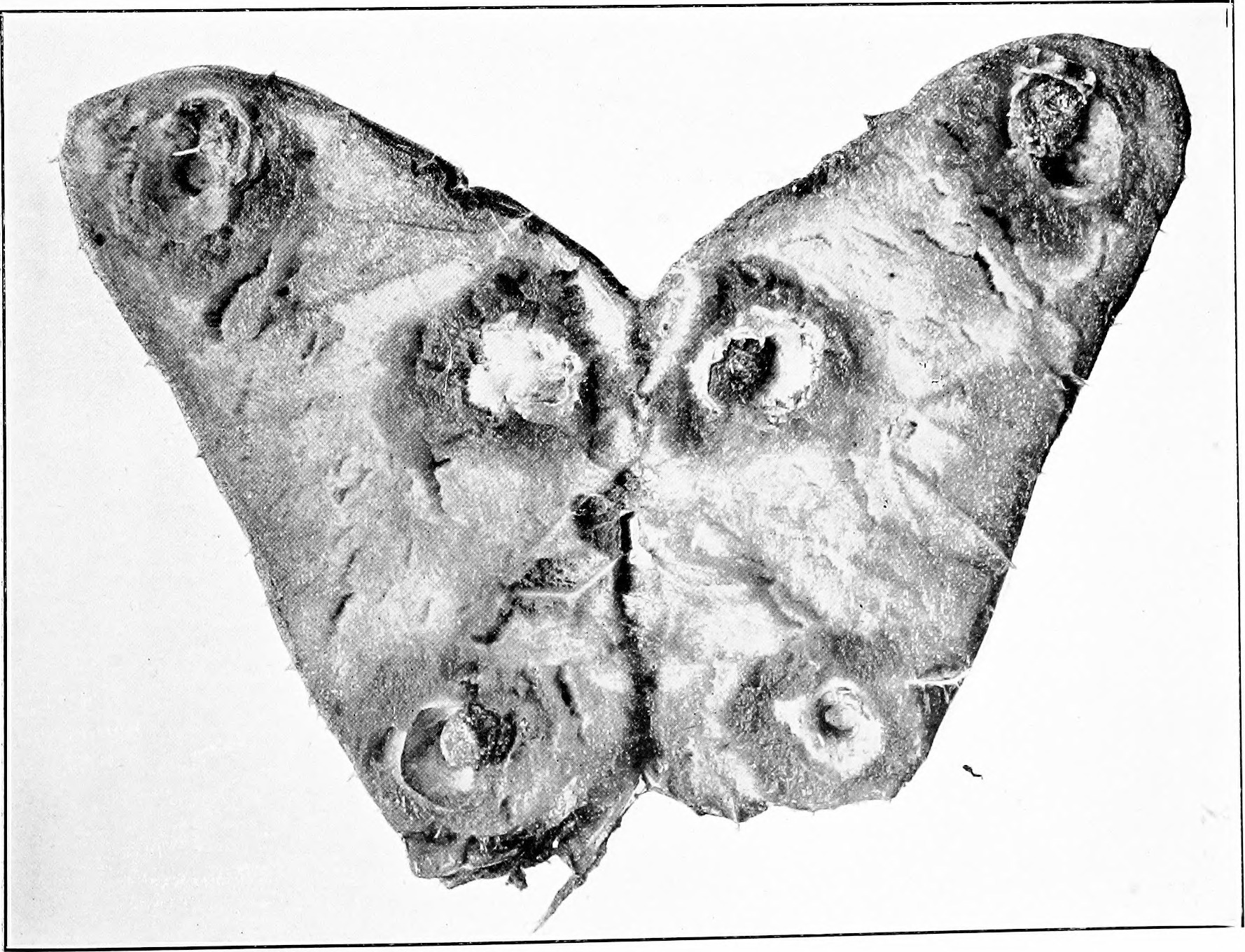
Part of a joint of a prickly pear cut open to show the pupa cases of a cactus weevil. From the Report of the Prickly-pear Travelling Commission

In 1912, Johnston was appointed chairman for a committee, the Prickly-Pear Travelling Commission, formed to investigate control measures for the prickly pear cactus. In 1788, Governor Philip and the early colonists are credited with the introduction of the prickly pear to Australia. The plant came from Brazil to Sydney and the prickly pear grew in Sydney. The plant was introduced for use as an agricultural fence and with hopes to establish a cochineal dye industry. Cochineal dye is the red or carmine dye used to colour the historic British "Red Coats". The prickly pears spread from New South Wales and caused great ecological damage in the eastern states of Australia. From 1912 to 1914, Johnston travelled abroad with Henry Tryon to study the problem. The team became known as "The Prickly Pair". They successfully introduced Dactylopius ceylonicus, the cochineal insect that was effective in the control of one species of the pear Opuntia monacantha.

In 1920 Johnston was appointed controller of the Commonwealth prickly pear laboratories. During 1920 to 1922, he travelled overseas yet again to seek a solution to the prickly pear problem, travelling from Sydney to Java, Ceylon, Europe, the US, Mexico and South America. Efforts had been made to introduce the insect Cactoblastis cactorum in 1914, and it did feed on the prickly pear, but died out in 1921. In 1924, Cactoblastis cactorum was reintroduced, this time with success and destruction of the prickly pear.

== Marine ecology ==
Johnston was keenly interested in the marine ecology of Caloundra and the southern Great Barrier Reef islands. He performed studies on the flora and fauna of Caloundra. He identified Pseudobonellia, a new echiuroid genus from the Great Barrier Reef. In 1920, Johnston identified a new species of Bonellia from Port Jackson.

== Parasitology and helminthology ==
Johnston had an interest in descriptive parasitology, and was a leading world expert on helminthology. He was a frequent and prolific contributor of new material to the collections of the South Australian Museum. In Queensland, he conducted studies in diverse areas as cattle tick, blowflies, muscidae, onchoceriasis and fish epidemics. Working with John Burton Cleland he studied worm nests in cattle due to Filaria gibsoni. He explored the internal parasites of Australian birds that included the emu. He studied the parasite mallophaga from marsupials. Johnston made significant contributions to the study of flies and parasitic worms, including Habronema and Musca domestica or housefly. He sought to develop a solution to the sheep maggot fly problem and the use of the parasitoid wasps as a possible answer.

== Parasites of freshwater fish ==
Johnston pursued the parasitology of freshwater fish. The first paper of this kind was an account of an epidemic of Saprolegnia in the fishes of the Thomson River in Queensland. James Douglas Ogilby provided some of the fish identifications and Johnston quoted his account of the infection near Sydney. Some years later, Johnston worked with Thomas Lane Bancroft's daughter Jo, Mabel Josephine Bancroft, and investigated parasites in freshwater fish in the rivers near Queensland and described several new species of sporozoans. Johnston and Bancroft noted in the paper that the specimens were identified by James Douglas Ogilby of the Queensland Museum and as tribute for these efforts names one of the parasites, Myxosoma ogilbyi, in his honour. In a work published in 1921, the team summarized their experience of episodes of mass mortality in the fishes of Queensland rivers and ventured a theory for the possible causes.

Later at the University of Adelaide, Johnston published with Patricia M. Mawson, daughter of Douglas Mawson, work on nematodes that included descriptions of new species found in freshwater fish of Australia. Several nematode species were discovered in the birds of Australia.

== Professional service ==
From 1915 to 1916, Johnston was president of the Royal Society of Queensland. From 1916 to 1917, he was president of the Queensland Field Naturalists' Club. He was a founding member of the Great Barrier Reef Committee and a member of the Australian National Research Council until his death.

In 1929, Johnston was invited by Douglas Mawson to serve as chief zoologist with the British Australian and New Zealand Antarctic Research Expedition.

During 1929 to 1931, he went on two voyages aboard the RRS Discovery. He was editor of the zoological and botanical reports. From 1929 to 1937, he accompanied John Burton Cleland in expeditions to Central Australia.

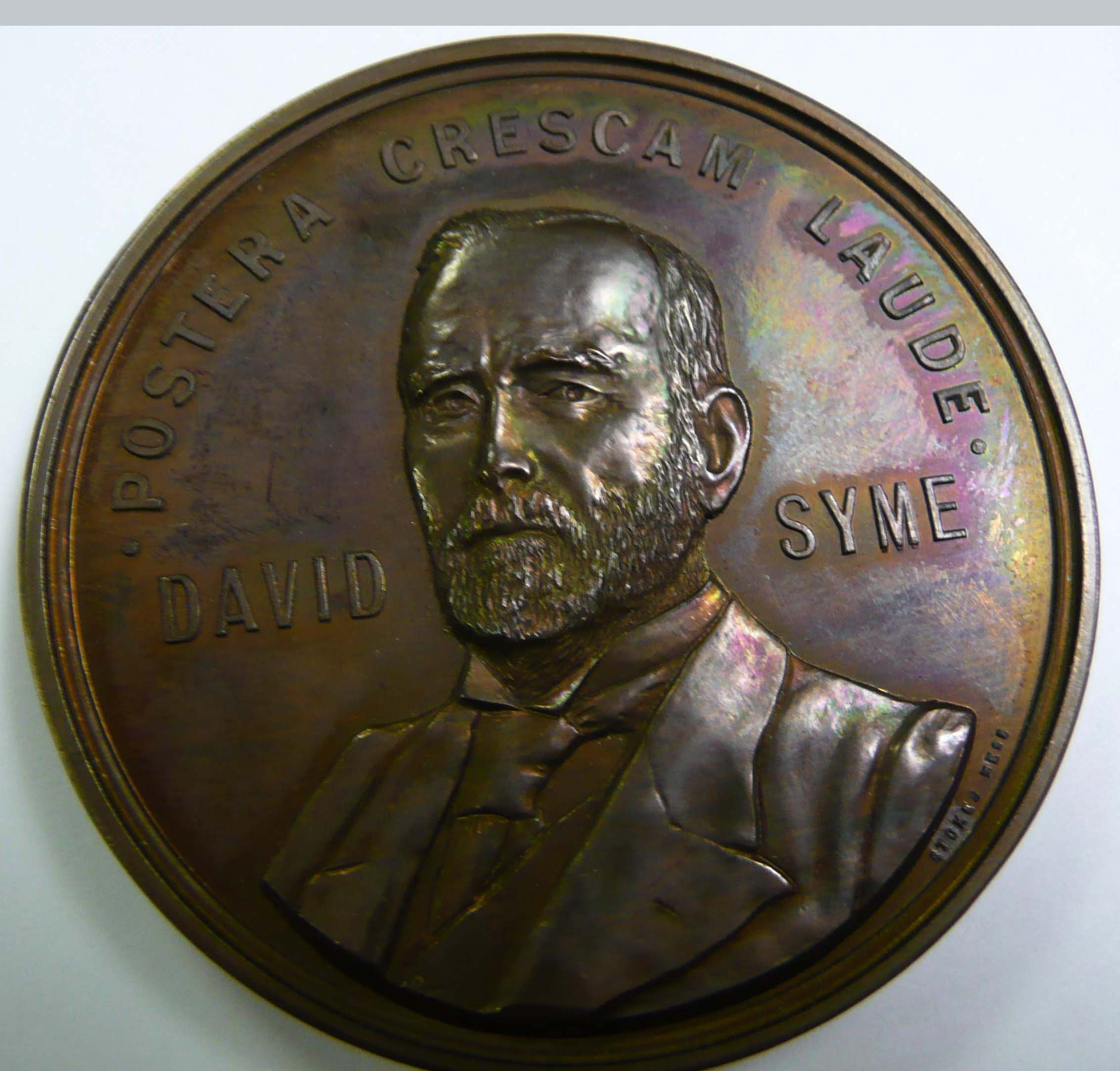
David Syme Research Prize

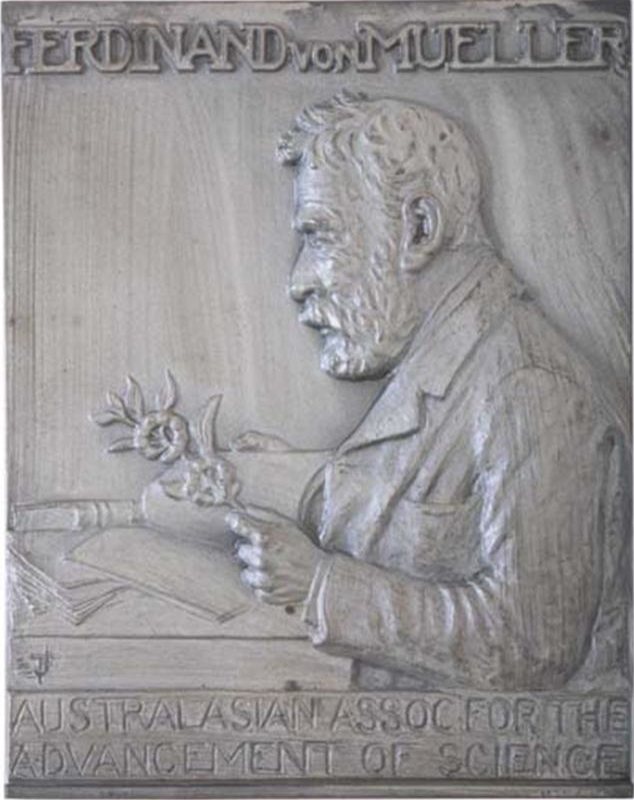
ANZAAS Mueller Medal

== Awards and honours ==
- Jones Memorial Medal, Sydney Teachers College
- David Syme Research Prize, 1913
- Walter and Eliza Hall fellowship in economic biology, University of Queensland – initial recipient
- Sir Joseph Verco Medal, 1935, from the Royal Society of South Australia
- Mueller Medal, 1939, Australian and New Zealand Association for the Advancement of Science
- He was awarded the Polar Medal, in recognition of his research on British, Australian and New Zealand Antarctic expeditions led by Douglas Mawson in 1929 and 1931.

== Publications ==
- On the anatomy and possible mode of transmission of Filaria (Onchocerca) gibsoni. (1910). Royal Society of New South Wales.
- The helminth parasites of man in Australia. (1912).
- An experiment: ["in the production of newspaper articles" on public health]. (1930).
- Acanthocephala, (Australasian Antarctic Expedition, 1911–1914. Scientific reports. Series C. Zoology and Botany). (1937).
