= Environmental sex determination =

Method of sex-determination

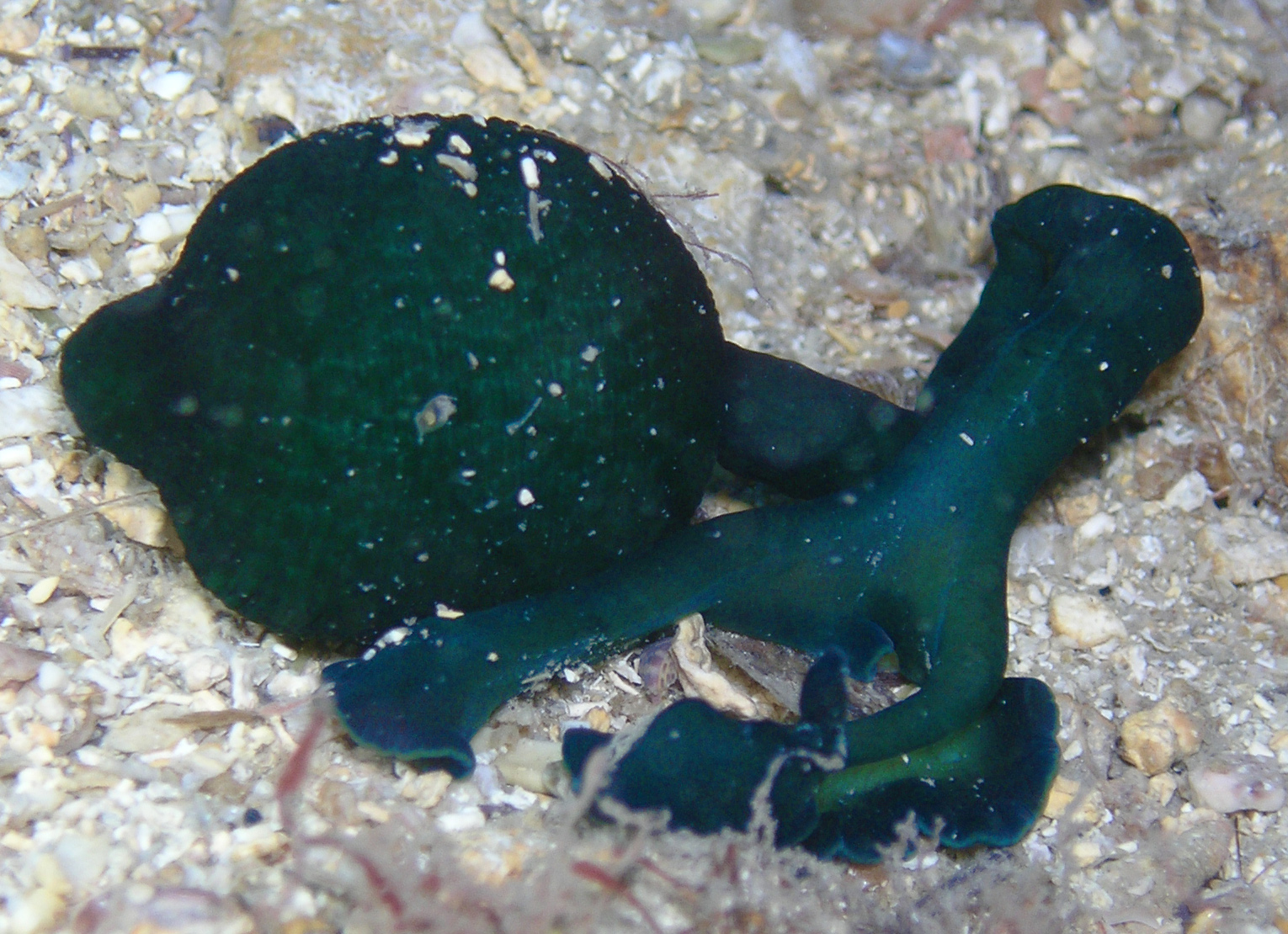
The sex of the green spoonworm, Bonellia viridis, a marine annelid, depends on where the larvae make landfall (female shown).

Environmental sex determination is the establishment of sex by a non-genetic cue, such as nutrient availability, experienced within a discrete period after fertilization. Environmental factors which often influence sex determination during development or sexual maturation include light intensity and photoperiod, temperature, nutrient availability, and pheromones emitted by surrounding plants or animals. This is in contrast to genotypic sex determination, which establishes sex at fertilization by genetic factors such as sex chromosomes. Under true environmental sex determination, once sex is determined, it is fixed and cannot be switched again. Environmental sex determination is different from some forms of sequential hermaphroditism in which the sex is determined flexibly after fertilization throughout the organism's life.

== Adaptive significance ==
Environmental sex determination is similar to certain forms of sexual selection in that there are oftentimes different and opposing selective pressures on males and females because of the costs of reproduction. Sexual selection is common throughout the tree of life (most known in birds); often resulting in sexual dimorphism, or size and appearance differences between sexes in the same species. In environmental sex determination, selective pressures over evolutionary time have selected for flexibility in sex determination to optimize fitness in a heterogenous environment because of the different costs of sex in males and females. Certain environmental conditions differentially affect each sex such that it would be beneficial to become one sex and not the other. This is especially pertinent for sessile organisms that cannot move to a different environment. In plants, for example, female sexual function is often more energetically expensive because once fertilized they must use significant stored energy to produce fruits, seeds, or sporophytes whereas males must only produce sperm (and sperm-containing structure; antheridium in seedless plants, and pollen in seed plants).

== Mechanisms ==
Lacking genetic information coding for separate sexes such as sex chromosomes, individuals that exhibit environmental sex determination contain genetic information coding for both sexes on autosomes. In general, once exposed to certain environmental cues, epigenetic changes cause developing individuals to become either male or female. Environmental cues that often trigger the development of males or females include temperature, nutrient (or food in the case of animals) and water availability, photoperiod, competitive stress, and pheromones from conspecific individuals. Specific mechanisms and cues vary between species.

== Taxonomic range ==
=== Crustaceans ===
The amphipod crustacean Gammarus duebeni produces males early in the mating season, and females later, in response to the length of daylight, the photoperiod. Because male fitness improves more than female fitness with increased size, environmental sex determination is adaptive in this system by permitting males to experience a longer growing season than females.

The branchiopod crustacean Daphnia magna parthenogenetically produces male progeny in response to a combination of three environmental factors, namely a reduced photoperiod in autumn, shortage of food and raised population density.

=== Annelids ===
Bonellia viridis, a marine worm, has location-dependent sex determination; sex depends on where the larvae land.

=== Vertebrates ===
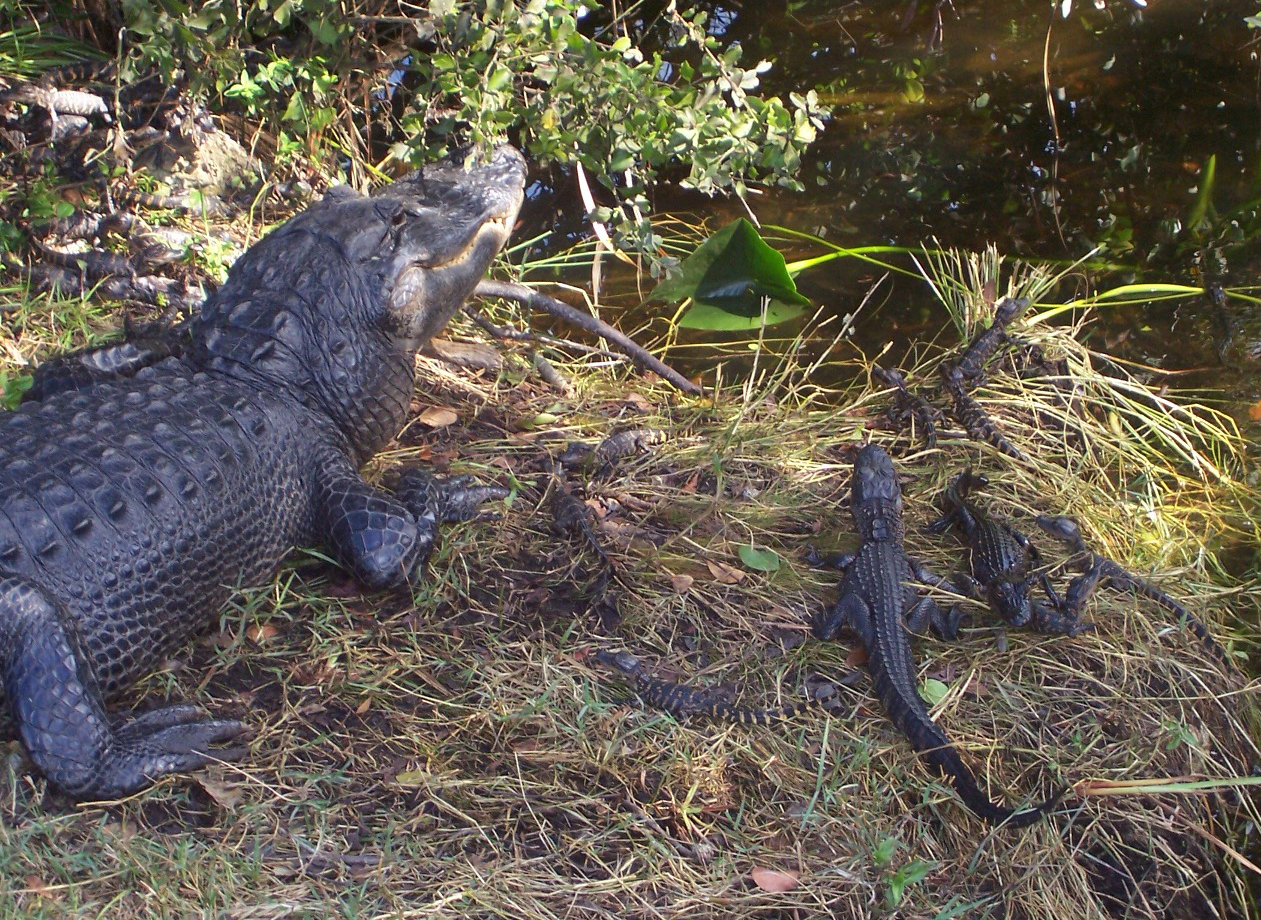
The sex of alligators is determined by nest temperature.

The sex of most amniote vertebrates, such as mammals and birds, is determined genetically. However, some reptiles have temperature-dependent sex determination, where sex is permanently determined by thermal conditions experienced during the middle third of embryonic development. The sex of crocodilians and sphenodontians is exclusively determined by temperature. In contrast, squamates (lizards and snakes) and turtles exhibit both genotypic sex determination and temperature-dependent sex determination, although temperature dependence is much more common in turtles than in squamates.

=== Ferns ===
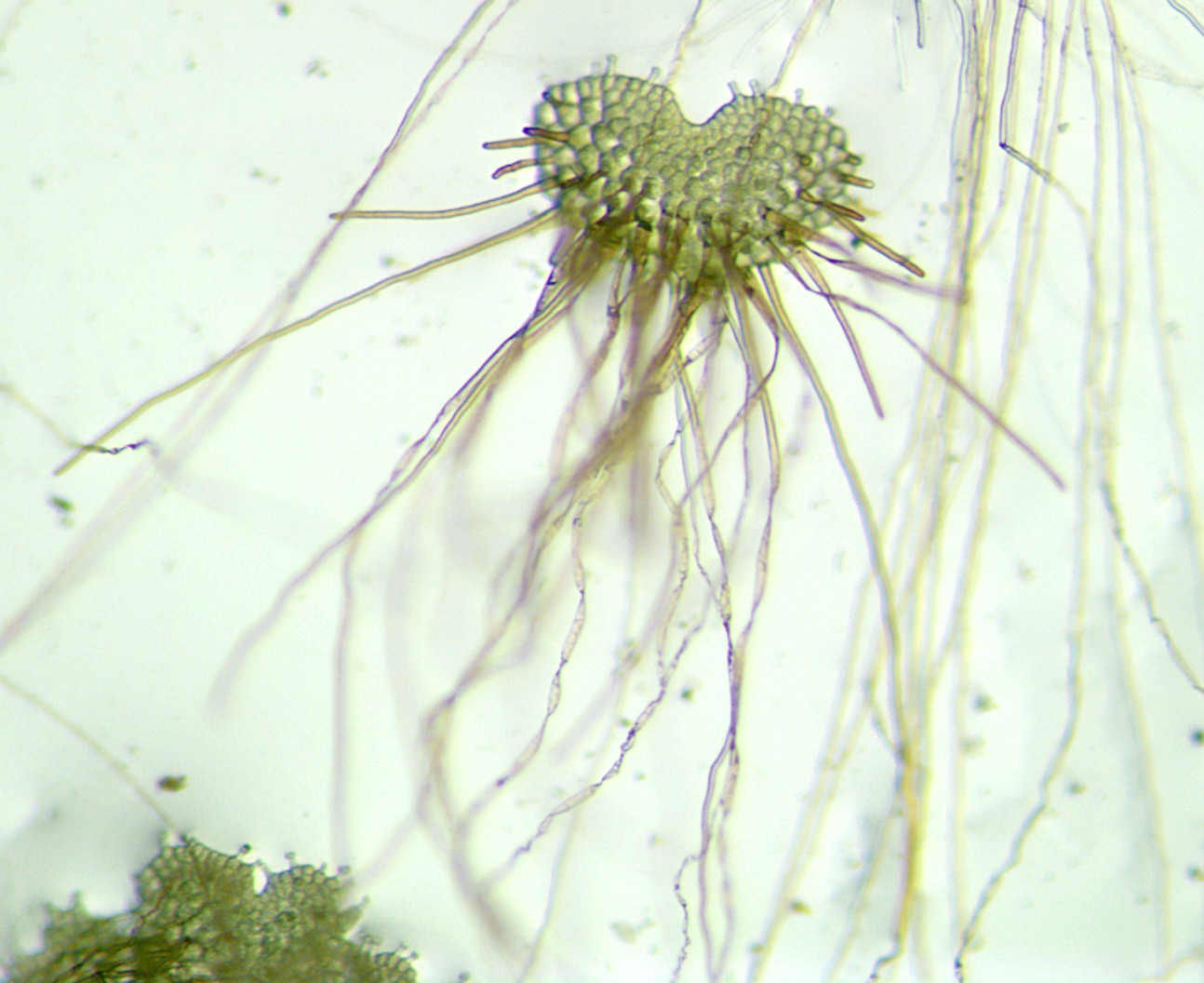
A developing fern gametophyte. While in this immature, asexual stage, a fern gametophyte may undergo environmental sex determination based on cues from the surrounding environment.

Most fern species (with a few exceptions, namely the Salvineales) are homosporous and lack sex chromosomes. Lacking genetic information coding for separate sexes, every fern spore has the capacity to become a male, female, or hermaphroditic gametophyte depending on the environment. In many fern species, including Ceratopteris richardii, environmental sex determination is linked to breeding systems. Fern gametophytes exhibit a wide variety of breed systems which can be divided into outcrossing and inbreeding. To promote outcrossing, female gametophytes release a chemical pheromone known as Antheridiogen which controls the sex of nearby developing gametophytes. Antheridiogen secreted by females promotes the development of nearby asexual gametophytes into males. This is adaptive because inducing maleness increases the probability of outcrossing as males provide sperm for the females rather than the females becoming hermaphroditic (or bisexual) and self-fertilizing. However, if no fertilization occurs, the female gametophyte can still become hermaphroditic and self-fertilize if the conditions are conducive to growth, ultimately resulting in inbreeding depression.

Additionally, similar to crocodilians, homosporous fern gametophyte sex is determined by the abiotic environment in accordance with the size-advantage model. In stressful environments (crowding or nutrient stress), gametophytes are smaller and develop into males. While in more favorable growing conditions, gametophytes are larger and develop into females.

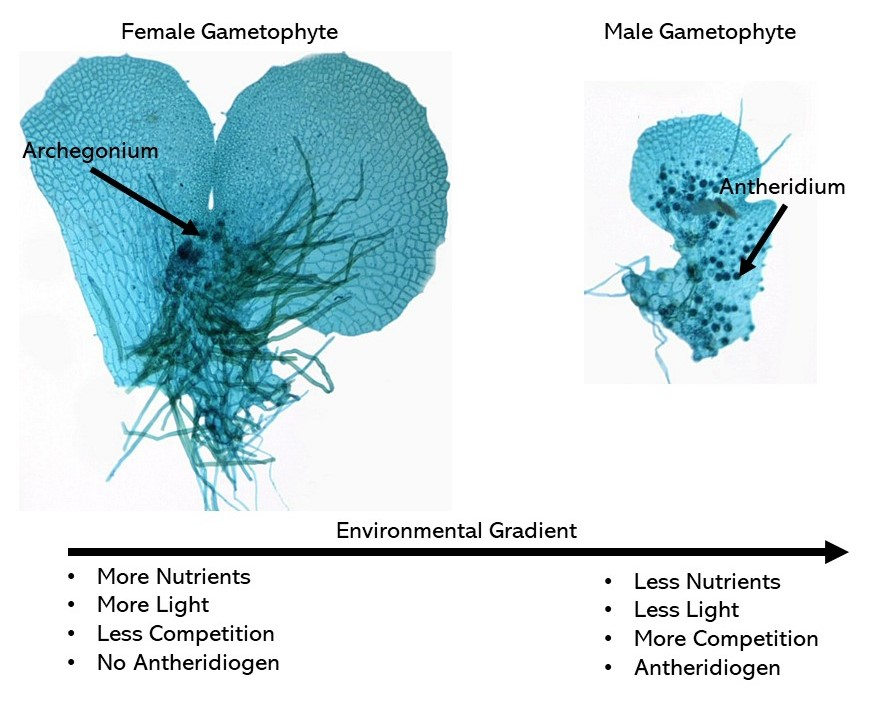
Environmental sex determination in ferns based on nutrient availability, light, competition, and the pheromone Antheridiogen

=== Moss ===
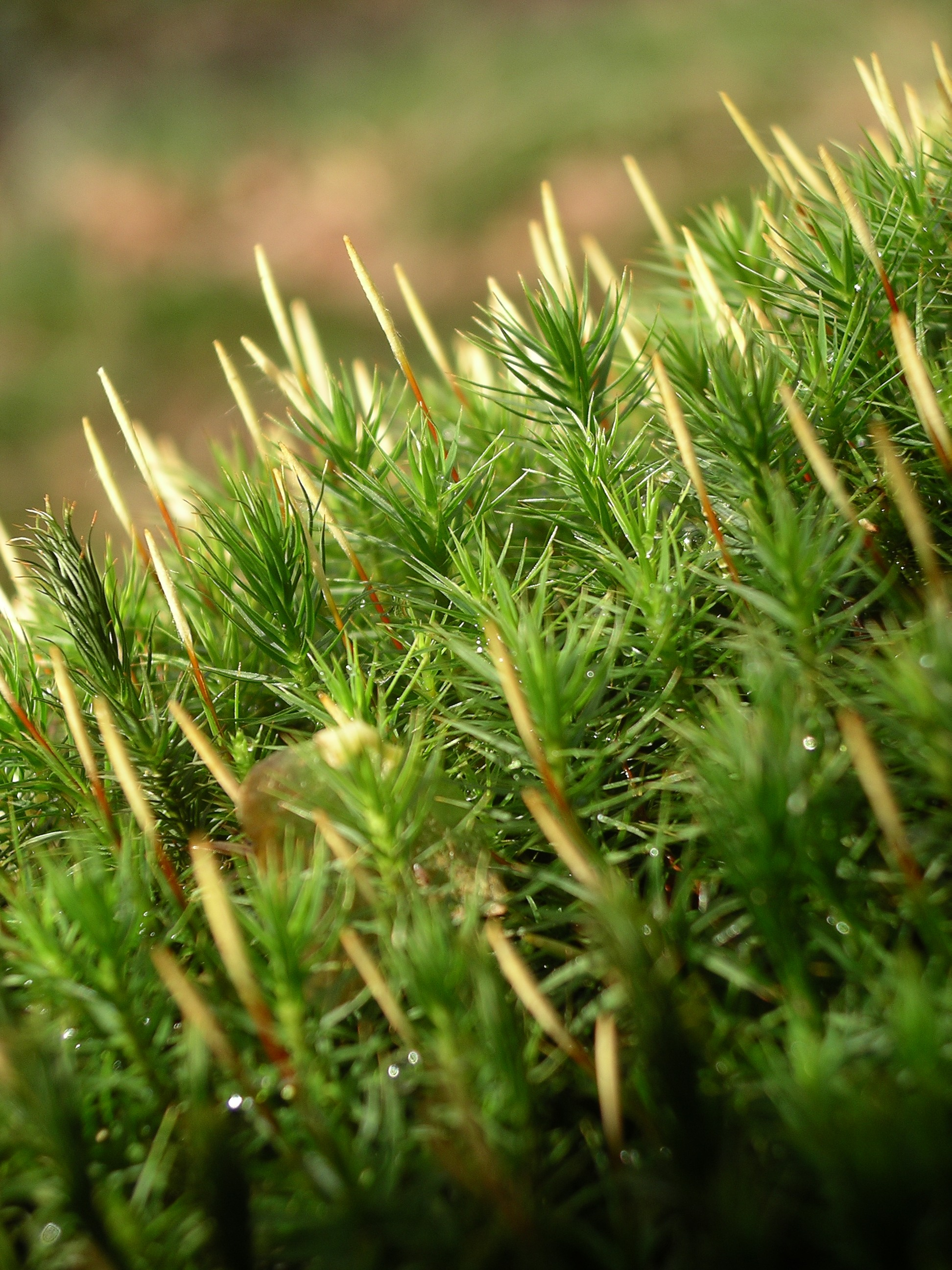
Moss gametophytes (green photosynthetic tissue) and sporophytes (upright, brown structures). The presence of many sporophytes, indicates that the moss is likely either monoicous and self fertilizing or dioicous with fertile males and females. This can be rare as females often outcompete males in mosses.

Moss gametophytes can be either asexual, female, male, or hermaphroditic like ferns. Unlike homosporous ferns, moss gametophytes can be either monoicous or dioicous (similar to monoecious and dioecious in vascular plants), with most studied dioicous species exhibiting genetic sex determination via the UV sex chromosome sex determination system. Some monoicous moss species such as Splachnum ampullaceum exhibit environmental sex determination during early development, with low light, low pH, and low nutrient availability all promoting male development. In the presence of auxin, a widespread plant hormone, or gibberellins, compounds similar to Antheridiogen in ferns, both female and male individuals invest more in sexual structures (antheridia and archegonia). Environmental sex determination in moss is fundamentally different from the spatial segregation of sexes, the occurrence of environmentally mediated sex ratios in moss patches, observed in sexually static moss species. Spatial segregation of the sexes in mosses is caused by differential survival rates between sexes as a result of the competitive advantage of female moss. This leads to female dominated populations maintained by asexual reproduction and minimal sexual reproduction. In contrast, environmental sex determination is the dynamic development of females or males in different environmental conditions.

=== Angiosperms ===
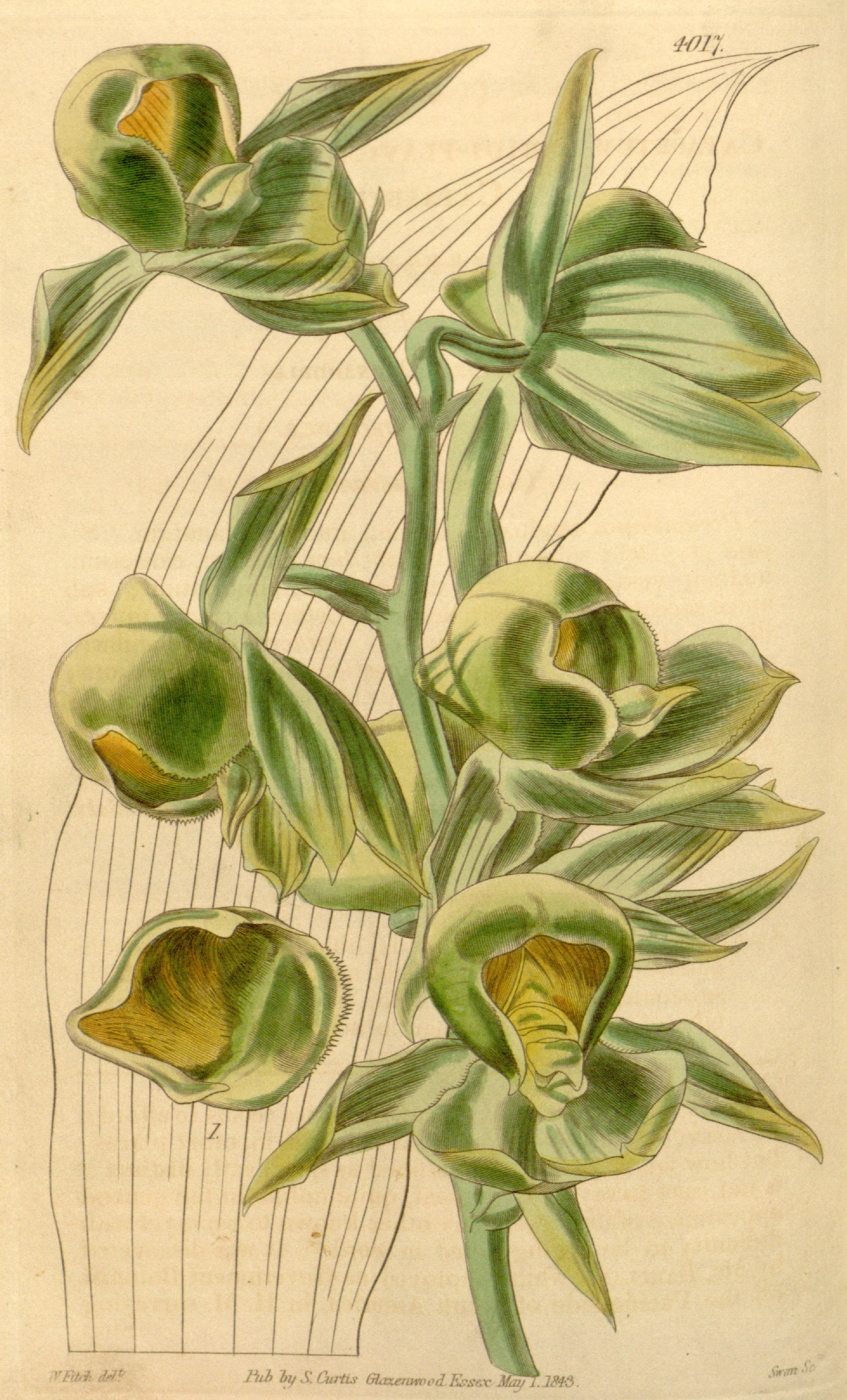
Flowering catasetum viridiflavum

Many angiosperms exhibit sequential hermaphroditism, meaning that they can switch sexes continually throughout their life based on the current conditions and resource availability to optimize fitness each flowering season. But sequential hermaphroditism and environmental sex determination are not mutually exclusive. For example, Catasetum viridiflavum, an epiphyte (plant that grows on another plant) in the Orchidaceae family exhibits sequential hermaphroditism where the younger, smaller individuals have male inflorescences and the older, larger individuals have female inflorescences, but sex expression is also strongly influenced by light intensity. Individuals in high light are more often female and individuals in the low light are more often male, regardless of size. In higher light, individuals produce more ethylene, a common plant hormone, which promotes the formation of female flowers.
