= Metabonellia =

Scientific classification
- Kingdom: Animalia
- Phylum: Annelida
- Clade: Pleistoannelida
- Clade: Sedentaria
- Subclass: Echiura
- Order: Echiuroidea
- Family: Bonelliidae
- Genus: Metabonellia; Stephen & Edmonds, 1972
- Species: M. haswelli

Binomial name
- Metabonellia haswelli (Johnston & Tiegs, 1920)

Synonyms
- Bonellia gigas Nielsen, 1963; Bonellia haswelli Johnston & Tiegs, 1920; Bonellia tasmanica Dartnall, 1970; Metabonellia gigas (Nielsen, 1963)

Genus of annelid worms

Metabonellia is a genus of marine spoon worms in the family Bonelliidae. It is a monotypic genus and Metabonellia haswelli is the only species. It is commonly known as the green spoon worm and is found in shallow waters around Australia.

== Description ==
The female worm has a sac-like trunk with a length of about 73 mm (2.9 in) and a width of 22 mm (0.9 in). In front of the mouth is an extensible proboscis of about 63 mm (2.5 in) with a forked tip. The proboscis has a ciliated groove on the underside along which food particles are passed to the mouth. Behind the mouth, and close to the nephridium, which is raised on a protuberance, are two chetae (bristles), the bases of which are buried in the muscle. The body wall has transverse rows of papillae with flattened tops. The colour of the trunk is a dark, greyish-green, the proboscis is rather paler, and the edges of the forked tip are whitish. In life, the shape and dimensions of the worm are difficult to ascertain because it is constantly wriggling about. The ovarian tissue is situated alongside the ventral blood vessel and the nephridium consists of several interconnecting sacs.

The male worm is minute in comparison, being 4 mm (0.16 in) in length, and 0.8 mm (0.03 in) in width, with a distinct tapering tail of 0.7 mm (0.028 in). It has a nephridium, a gonad and a rudimentary gut, but no chetae. The males live inside one of the sacs of the female's nephridium, where the eggs are also stored, and obtains its nutrition from the fluid in which it is immersed.

== Distribution and habitat ==
Metabonellia haswelli is found in shallow water around the coast of Australia and Tasmania. Known locations include Port Jackson in New South Wales, Boat Harbour Beach in Tasmania, Flinders, Victoria and Point Lonsdale, Victoria. Typical habitat is on sand under rocks, in gullies, and on reefs. Its depth range is from the lower shore down to 30 m (98 ft).

== Ecology ==
This worm immerses itself in the sediment or hides its trunk under a rock, extending its proboscis with its two-pronged tip flattened over the substrate. It is a deposit feeder, and any food particles that land on the proboscis are channelled towards the mouth.
