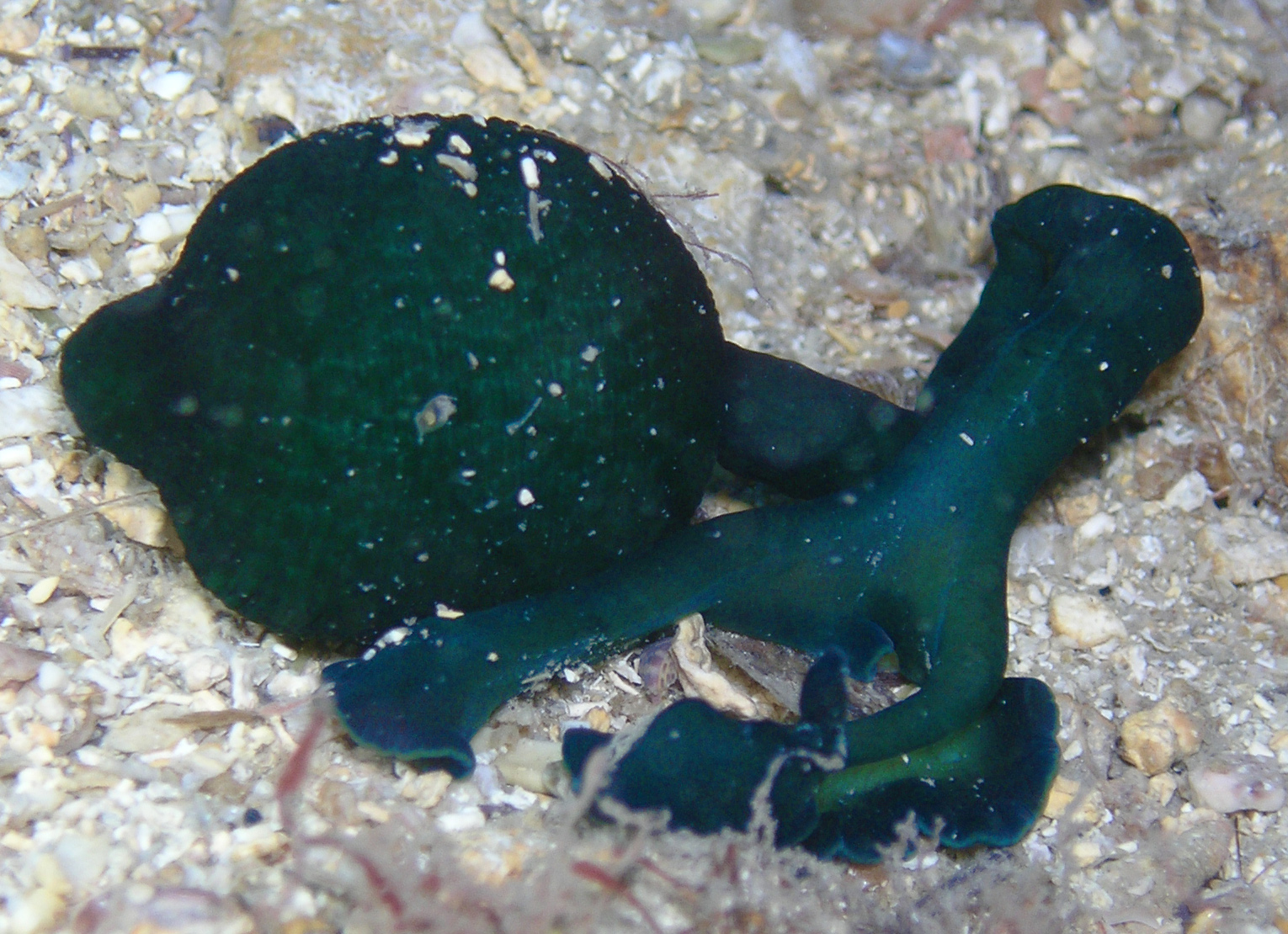
- Bonellia viridis (adult female)

Scientific classification
- Kingdom: Animalia
- Phylum: Annelida
- Clade: Pleistoannelida
- Clade: Sedentaria
- Subclass: Echiura
- Order: Echiuroidea
- Family: Bonelliidae
- Genus: Bonellia
- Species: B. viridis

Binomial name
- Bonellia viridis (Rolando, 1821)

= Bonellia viridis =

Green spoonworm

Species of annelid worm

Bonellia viridis, the green spoonworm, is a marine worm (class Polychaeta, phylum Annelida). It is noted for displaying exceptional sexual dimorphism, for having an unusual sex-determination system, and for the biocidal properties of a pigment in its skin.

== Distribution ==
The species is wide-ranging, found in the north-eastern Atlantic Ocean and the Mediterranean Sea.

== Description ==
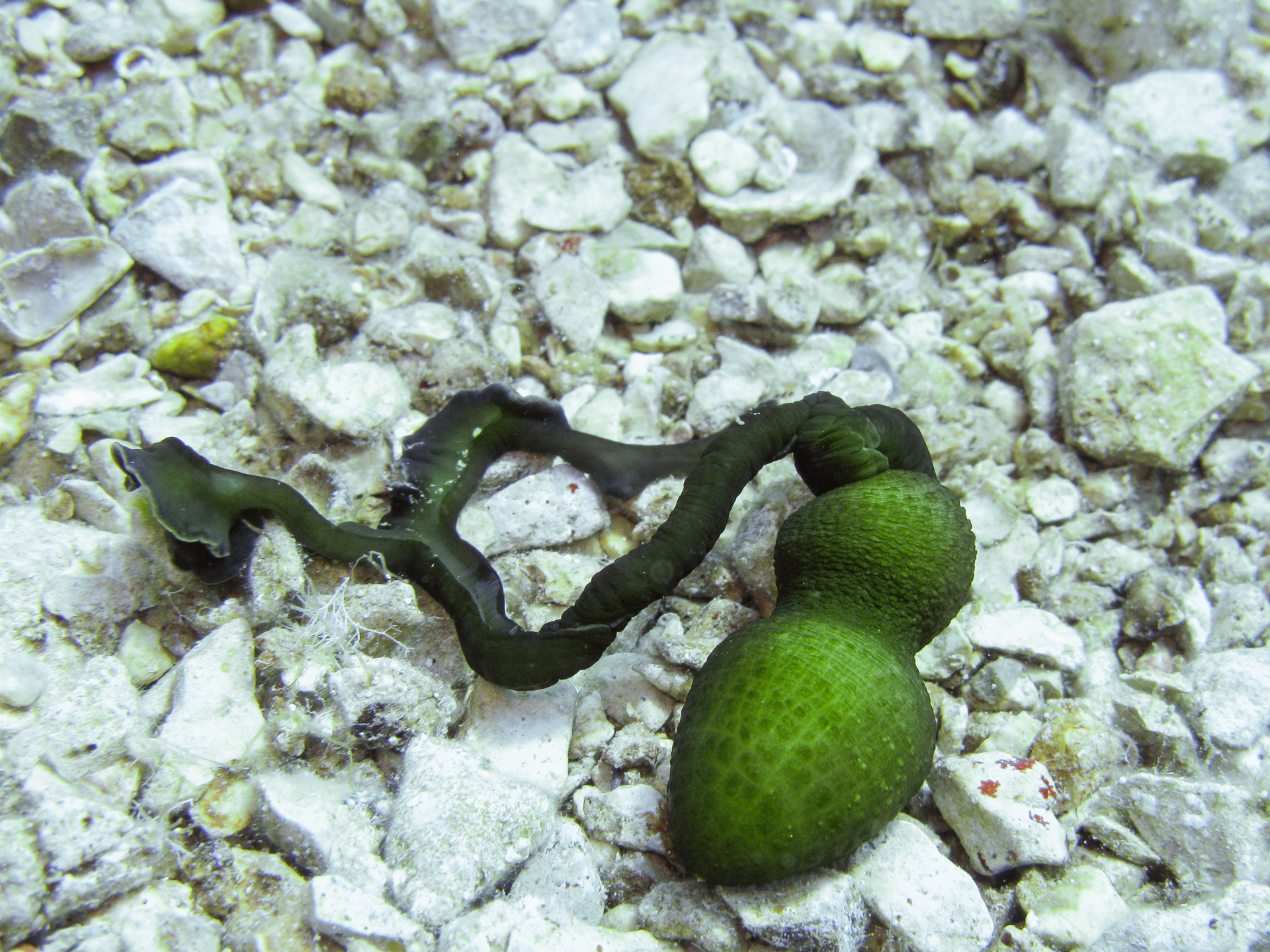
adult female of the green spoonworm (Bonellia viridis) from the Adriatic sea

The pale- to dark-green female, with a 15 cm-long, round or sausage-shaped body, lives on the sea-floor at a depth of 10 to 100 metres, concealed by burrowing in gravel or hiding in rock crevasses or burrows abandoned by other animals. It has two anchoring hooks underneath its body and an extensible feeding proboscis up to 10 times its body-length. It is mainly a detritivore, feeding also on small animals. The male is rarely observed: it has a flat, unpigmented body which grows to only 1–3 mm, taken up mostly by reproductive organs and devoid of other structures; it lives on or inside the body of a female.

== Bonellin as a biocide ==
The adult Bonellia female produces a vivid green pigment in its skin, known as bonellin. This chemical, concentrated mostly in the proboscis, is highly toxic to other organisms, capable of paralyzing small animals. In the presence of light, bonellin is a very effective biocide, killing bacteria, larva of other organisms, and red blood cells in laboratory tests. It is currently being investigated as a possible model for novel antibiotics.

Most larvae, however, come in contact with the bonellin in the skin of an adult female—its body or its roving, bonellin-rich proboscis—and are masculinised by this exposure. The chemical causes these larvae to develop into the tiny males, which cling to the female's body or are sucked inside it by the feeding tube, to spend the remainder of their lives inside her genital sac, producing sperm to fertilize her eggs, reliant on her for all other needs.

The sex of a green spoonworm is thus determined by external, environmental factors (the presence or absence of bonellin), not by internal, genetic factors (chromosomes), as is the case with most other sexually differentiated organisms. This environmental sex determination helps green spoonworm populations respond to the availability of burrows.
