= Maxmuelleria =

Scientific classification
- Kingdom: Animalia
- Phylum: Annelida
- Clade: Pleistoannelida
- Clade: Sedentaria
- Subclass: Echiura
- Order: Echiuroidea
- Family: Bonelliidae
- Genus: Maxmuelleria; Bock, 1942

Genus of annelid worms

Maxmuelleria is a genus of echiurans belonging to the family Bonelliidae.

The genus has almost cosmopolitan distribution.

Species:

- Maxmuelleria aulacoferum (Hérubel, 1924)
- Maxmuelleria faex (Selenka, 1885)
- Maxmuelleria gigas (Müller, 1852)
- Maxmuelleria lankesteri (Herdman, 1897)
- Maxmuelleria verrucosum (Studer, 1879)
