= Maxmuelleria lankesteri =

Scientific classification
- Kingdom: Animalia
- Phylum: Annelida
- Clade: Pleistoannelida
- Clade: Sedentaria
- Subclass: Echiura
- Order: Echiuroidea
- Family: Bonelliidae
- Genus: Maxmuelleria
- Species: M. lankesteri

Binomial name
- Maxmuelleria lankesteri (Herdman, 1897)

Synonyms
- Thalassema lankesteri Herdman, 1897

Species of annelid worm

Maxmuelleria lankesteri is a species of spoon worm in the family Bonelliidae. It is found in the North Atlantic Ocean. It burrows into soft sediment on the seabed, mostly in deep water.

== Description ==
The female Maxmuelleria lankesteri is broadly cylindrical and grows to a length of about 120 mm (4.7 in), and a width of 30 mm (1.2 in). It has a proboscis which is nearly as long as the body. The proboscis is scoop-shaped with a truncated tip, but does not divide in two parts. There are a pair of large chaetae (bristles) on the under side of the body just posterior to the proboscis and the genital groove is obscure. Both body and proboscis are green. The morphology of the male is not known.

== Distribution and habitat ==
Maxmuelleria lankesteri is native to the northeastern Atlantic Ocean. Its range includes the Kattegat, the Skagerrak, the western coast of Scotland and the Irish Sea. It is mainly a deep sea species, burrowing in soft sediment.

== Ecology ==
This species makes a large semi-permanent burrow in sandy or muddy sediment. There is often a mound of sediment up to 20 cm (8 in) high by the single, funnel-shaped entrance to the burrow, and there is some evidence that a second entrance exists. Immediately below the entrance is a circular constriction with smooth walls, but beyond this the tunnel becomes wider and gradually becomes more horizontal. It may descend as deep as 80 cm (31 in) below the surface. Other animals are often found living symbiotically in the burrow, including polychaete worms and bivalve molluscs. Several species of goby may also live near the entrance and made their own modifications to the burrow, as also does the crustacean Jaxea nocturna.
