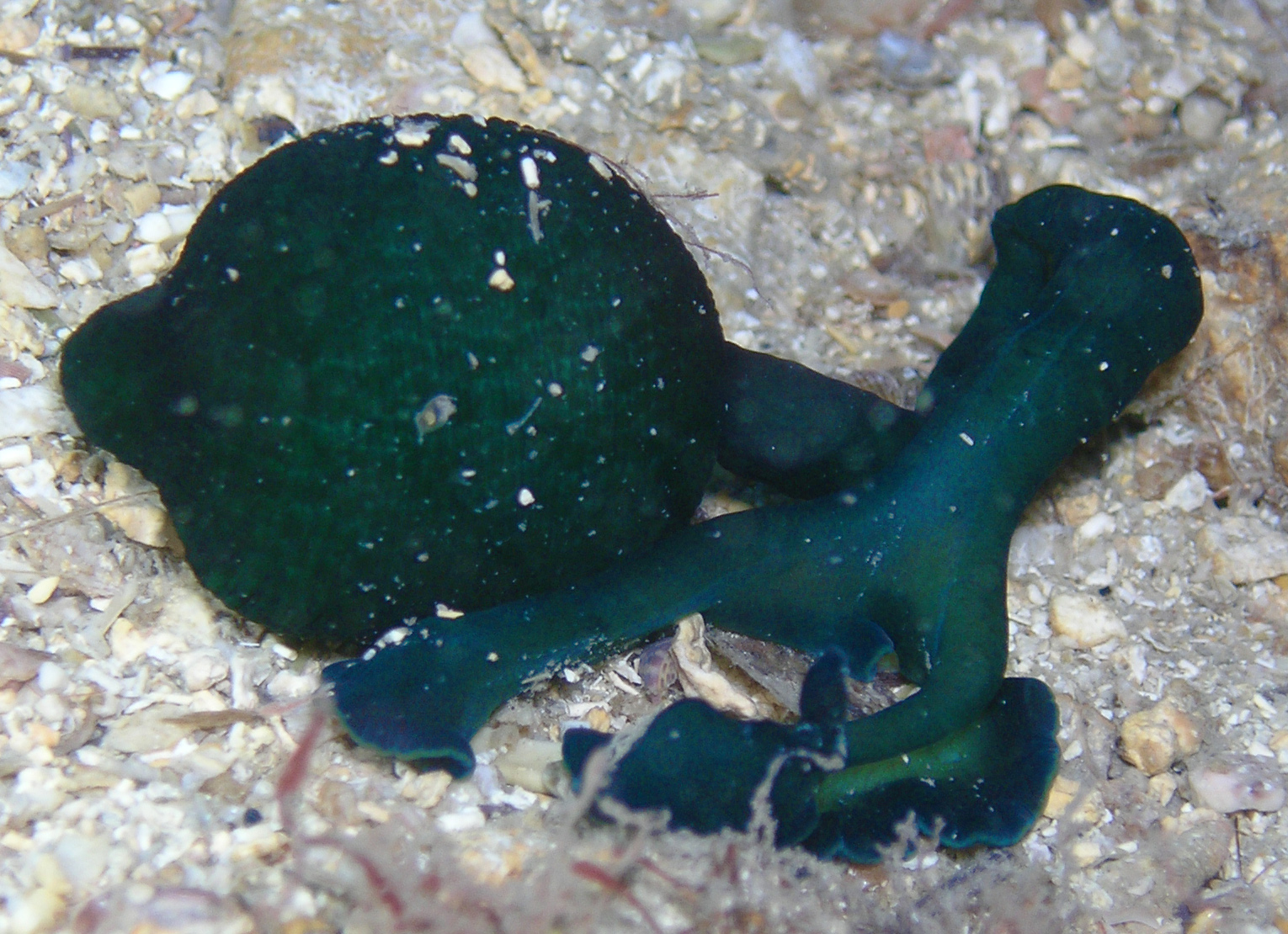
- Bonellia viridis (adult female)

Scientific classification
- Kingdom: Animalia
- Phylum: Annelida
- Clade: Pleistoannelida
- Clade: Sedentaria
- Order: Capitellida
- Family: Thalassematidae
- Subfamily: Bonelliinae; Lacaze-Duthiers, 1858

Type genus
- Bonellia Rolando, 1822

Genera
- see text

= Bonelliinae =

Family of annelid worms

Bonelliinae is a subfamily of spoon worms noted for being sexually dimorphic, with males being tiny in comparison with the females. They occupy burrows in the seabed in many parts of the world's oceans, often at great depths.

== Characteristics ==
Members of the subfamily Bonelliinae are plump, unsegmented worms, commonly known as spoonworms. The mouth is at the anterior end of the trunk and a flattened proboscis extends forward in front of the mouth. The ventral side of the proboscis has a ciliated channel along which food particles and mucus are moved towards the mouth. Close behind the mouth are two hooked chaetae and one or two nephridial pores. The gut is much longer than the body and is folded and coiled inside the coelom (body cavity). The anus is at the posterior end of the body and two anal vesicles with ciliated funnels open into the cloaca.

The females of the Bonelliinae are very much larger than the dwarf males, and in most, if not all, instances the males live on or inside the female. The anal vesicles of the females are sac-like and bear the ciliated funnels on tubules, which branch in most genera. Some genera lack the hooked chaetae behind the mouth, and none of the genera have chaetae at the posterior end of the trunk. Most genera contain the pigment bonellin which gives them a green colour and may have antibiotic or defensive properties.

Males are quite different in appearance; the minute, ciliated body consists of little except a gonad, a seminal vesicle and two protonephridia. In most species, the male is found inside the genital sac of the female. The sex of a bonelliid spoonworm depends where the planktonic larva settles. If it settles on an adult worm of its own species, it develops into a dwarf male, but if it settles anywhere else, it develops into a full-size female.

== Distribution and habitat ==
Members of this family live in both warm and cold seas at a range of depths, with 60% of species living deeper than 3,000 m (10,000 ft) and some at abyssal depths greater than 4,000 m (13,000 ft). The worms inhabit burrows they dig in soft sediment, extending the flattened proboscis from the burrow along the surface of the sediment.

== Genera ==
The following genera are included in this family:-

- Acanthobonellia Fisher, 1948
- Acanthohamingia Ikeda, 1910
- Achaetobonellia Fisher, 1953
- Alomasoma Zenkevitch, 1958
- Amalosoma Fisher, 1948
- Archibonellia Fischer, 1919
- Bengalus Biseswar, 2006
- Biporus Murina & Popkov, 2000
- Bonellia Rolando, 1822
- Bruunellia Zenkevitch, 1966
- Charcotus DattaGupta, 1981
- Choanostomellia Zenkevitch, 1964
- Dattaguptus Murina & Popkov, 2000
- Eubonellia Fisher, 1946
- Hamingia Danielssen & Koren, 1880
- Ikeda Wharton, 1913
- Ikedella Monro, 1927
- Jakobia Zenkevitch, 1958
- Kurchatovus DattaGupta, 1977
- Maxmuelleria Bock, 1942
- Metabonellia Stephen & Edmonds, 1972
- Nellobia Fisher, 1946
- Prometor Fisher, 1948
- Protobonellia Ikeda, 1908
- Pseudobonellia Johnston & Tiegs, 1919
- Pseudoikedella Murina, 1978
- Sluiterina Monro, 1927
- Torbenwolffia Zenkevitch, 1966
- Vitjazema Zenkevitch, 1958
- Zenkevitchiola Murina, 1978

== See also ==
- Maxmuelleria lankesteri
