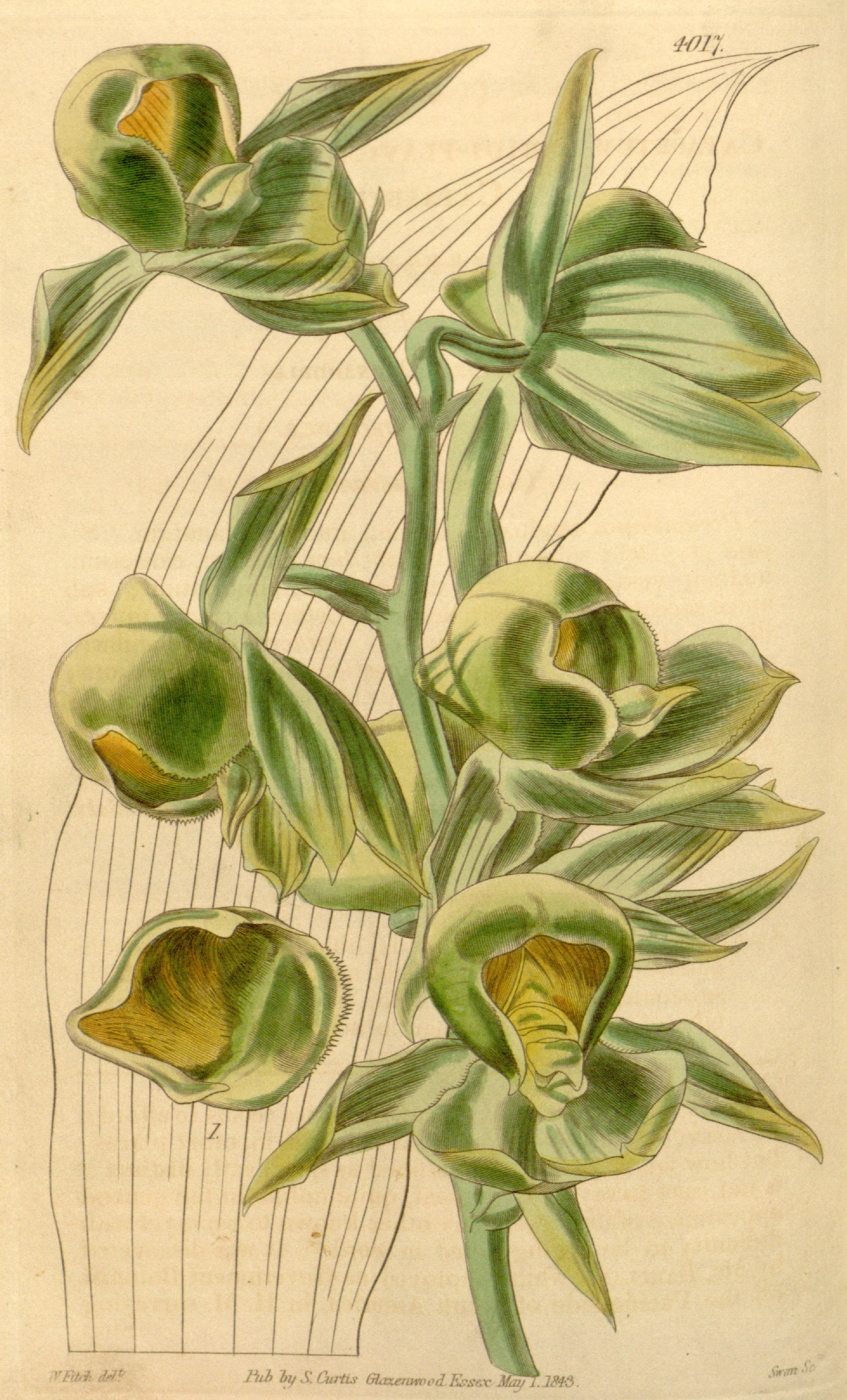

Scientific classification
- Kingdom: Plantae
- Clade: Tracheophytes
- Clade: Angiosperms
- Clade: Monocots
- Order: Asparagales
- Family: Orchidaceae
- Subfamily: Epidendroideae
- Genus: Catasetum
- Species: C. viridiflavum

Binomial name
- Catasetum viridiflavum Hook. (1843)

Synonyms
- Catasetum serratum Lindl. (1847)

= Catasetum viridiflavum =

Species of orchid

Catasetum viridiflavum, the green-yellow catasetum, is a species of orchid.
