= Pseudobonellia =

Scientific classification
- Kingdom: Animalia
- Phylum: Annelida
- Clade: Pleistoannelida
- Clade: Sedentaria
- Subclass: Echiura
- Order: Echiuroidea
- Family: Bonelliidae
- Genus: Pseudobonellia; Johnston & Tiegs, 1919

Genus of annelid worms

Pseudobonellia is a genus of echiurans belonging to the family Bonelliidae.

The species of this genus are found in Australia and Northern America.

Species:

- Pseudobonellia biuterina Johnston & Tiegs, 1919
- Pseudobonellia iraidii Murina, 1984
