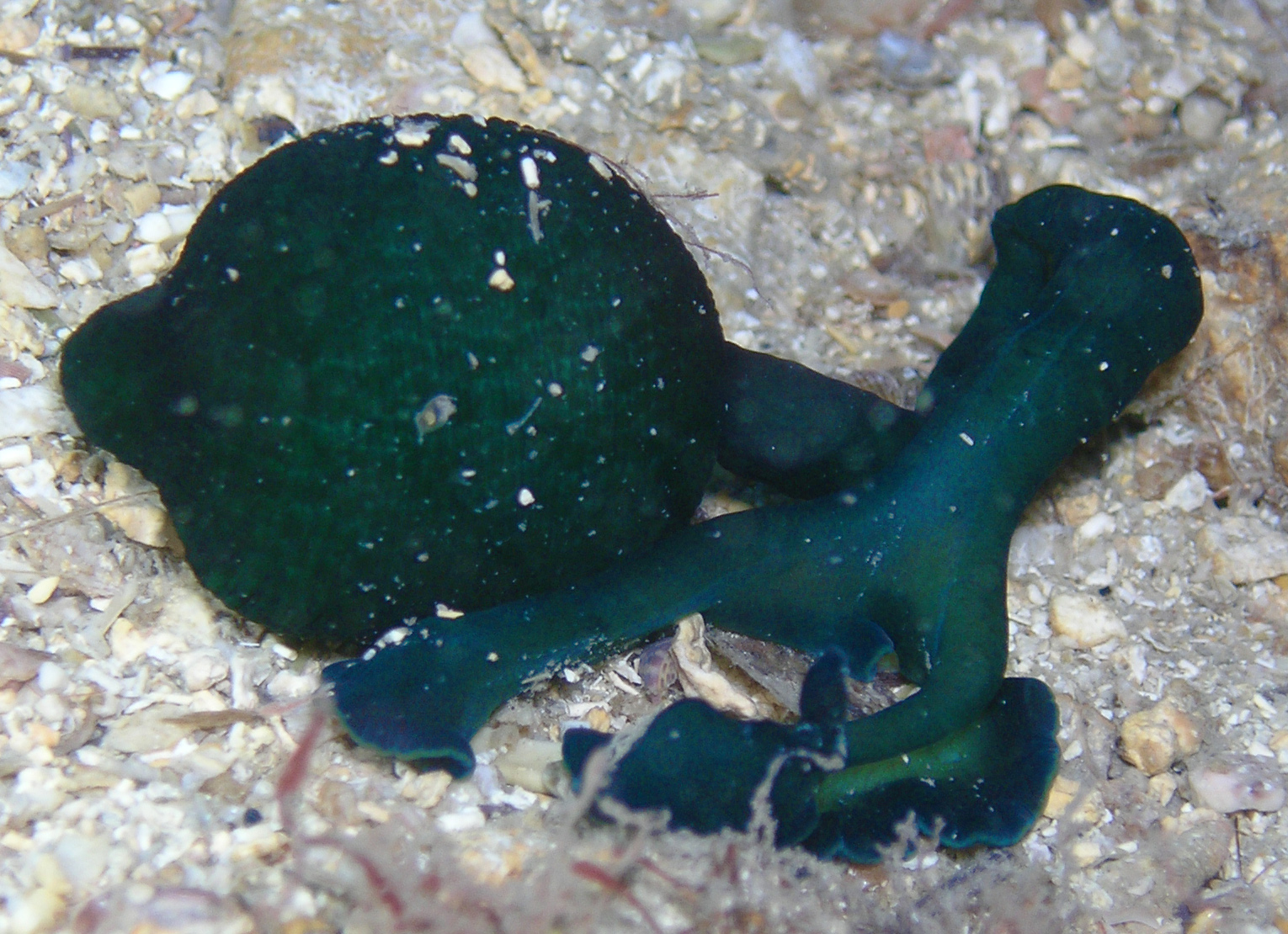
- Bonellia viridis

Scientific classification
- Kingdom: Animalia
- Phylum: Annelida
- Clade: Pleistoannelida
- Clade: Sedentaria
- Subclass: Echiura
- Order: Echiuroidea
- Family: Bonelliidae
- Genus: Bonellia; Rolando, 1822

= Bonellia (annelid) =

Genus of annelid worms

Bonellia is a genus of polychaetes belonging to the family Bonelliidae.

The genus has almost cosmopolitan distribution.

Species:

- Bonellia minor Marion & Rietsh, 1886
- Bonellia pacifica Zenkevitch, 1958
- Bonellia pilosa Dartnall, 1973
- Bonellia plumosa DattaGupta, 1981
- Bonellia pumicea Sluiter, 1891
- Bonellia sabulosa Dartnall, 1976
- Bonellia suhmii Selenka, 1885
- Bonellia thomensis Fischer, 1922
- Bonellia viridis Rolando, 1822
